= Tasburgh =

Village in Norfolk, England

Coordinates: 52°30′54″N 01°14′51″E

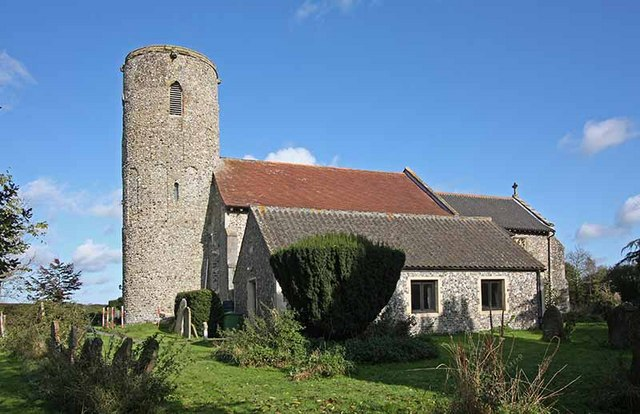
- St Mary's Church, Tasburgh

- Location within Norfolk
- Area: 3.71 km^{2} (1.43 sq mi)
- Population: 1,149 (2011)
  - Density: 310/km^{2} (800/sq mi)
- OS grid reference: TM205955
- Civil parish: Tasburgh
- District: South Norfolk
- Shire county: Norfolk
- Region: East
- Country: England
- Sovereign state: United Kingdom
- Post town: NORWICH
- Postcode district: NR15
- Dialling code: 01508
- Police: Norfolk
- Fire: Norfolk
- Ambulance: East of England
- UK Parliament: South Norfolk

Tasburgh (/ˈteɪzbərə/ TAYZ-bər-ə) is a civil parish and a village in the south of Norfolk, England, located approximately 8 miles south of Norwich. It lies on the A140 road, north of Long Stratton and south of Newton Flotman. The River Tas flows nearby and Tasburgh Hall lies to the west of the village. The local church is dedicated to St. Mary the Virgin. The village is made up of Upper Tasburgh and Lower Tasburgh. The majority of Lower Tasburgh contains buildings from the early days of the village whilst Upper Tasburgh is made up of more modern housing.

The village's name means 'Taesa's fortification' and could also be interpreted as 'pleasant/convenient fortification'.

Children of primary school age attend Tasburgh Primary School, in Upper Tasburgh, whereas secondary school students attend Long Stratton High School.

The village hall and adjacent social club is used for a range of functions and is home to Tasburgh's community run post office, set up following the closure of the post office store on Church Road in 2013.

A public house, The Countryman, is located in the village, by the A140. This is opposite the site of a former Little Chef restaurant, which has since become a garden building show centre.

The village is well served by public transport, with frequent bus services between Norwich and Long Stratton, operated by First Norfolk & Suffolk, Konectbus and Simonds of Botesdale calling in Tasburgh.

== History ==
=== Early and ancient history ===
A large hill fort (Ad Taum) abuts the village at the northwest, and the village church is built within it. This may be a remnant of the Danish invasion of the ninth century.

Tasburgh church is a traditional Norfolk Saxon church of flint with a round tower.

The first human beings to leave their mark on Tasburgh were fur-clad Mesolithic hunter bands some time between 8500 BC and 4500 BC. Between what is now Low Road and the River Tas, behind both the old Horseshoes public house and the nearby garage workshop, a scatter of fine flint flakes has revealed where hunters trimmed their spear and arrow heads at a site where firm ground came close to the river by a ford which is still marked on maps. A second ford crossing the tributary stream from Hempnall lay a short distance to the south and remains in use, partly bridged, to this day. More of their flints have turned up higher on the valley slopes near the village hall and the church.

By around 4000 BC the hunter bands had become merged with incoming Neolithic farmers. Flint fragments from the farmer's tools have been found spread widely across the area enclosed by Grove Lane, Low Road and Church Hill.

Some of these Neolithic people lived in what is now the eastern end of the churchyard where sherds of their pottery have been found together with pot boilers and evidence of flint working.

Relics of the Bronze Age have been unearthed in Henry Preston Road where a distinctive beaker marked a probable early Bronze Age burial and behind Hall Farm in the far south of the parish where burial mounds have been traced.

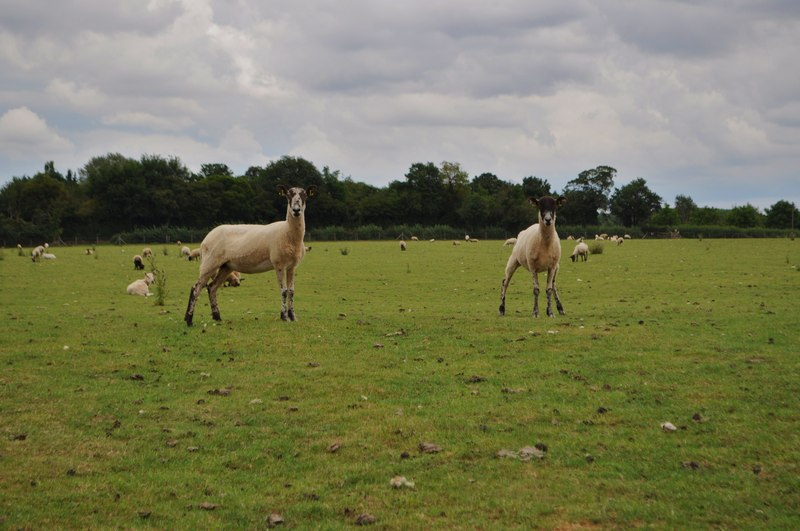
Sheep on the poorly preserved fort

Forty-three pieces of Iron Age pottery have been found close by the church, indicating that occupation continued in this area. By the first century AD the people of Norfolk and north Suffolk had become a single tribe, the Iceni, and coins of this age inscribed IC.DURO.T are reported to have been found in Tasburgh.

Chapel Hill, a knoll in the water meadows west of Tasburgh Hall, has produced extensive evidence of ancient burials. Ditch digging south west of the hillock in 1923 revealed several complete and broken amphorae (large wine jars).

=== Roman Tasburgh ===
The most impressive sign of Roman times in Tasburgh was and remains the trunk road running from south to north across the parish, now the A140 which runs from Norwich to Ipswich. The road was constructed to link important Roman towns at London and Colchester with the newly established capital of the Iceni, Venta Icenorum, which stood alongside the River Tas at Caistor St Edmund. The roadway itself was twenty feet wide with a steeply cambered surface of hard packed gravel.

Two Roman coins have been found in the village, one close to the church and the other a short way uphill from the ford near the old Horseshoes public house. Pottery, held to be Roman, has been unearthed in association with burials at Chapel Hill.

The only signs of early Anglo-Saxon activity in Tasburgh are pottery fragments from the churchyard excavations indicating that this site continued to be occupied. One hundred and forty-four pieces of pottery from the churchyard site dating to between AD 600 and AD 900 show that settlement there continued.

With Danes settled among the previous villagers the hamlet around the church expanded. The churchyard 'dig' revealed over 1000 pottery sherds dating to between AD 900 and AD 1100 together with strap fittings, loom weights, a knife and an arrowhead. The foundation trenches of a house of this period were also excavated. It was a wooden building thirty-six feet by seventeen feet and would have been open to the rafters with an open hearth from which smoke escaped through the thatched roof. About AD 1050 a small church of flints and mortar with a 40 ft-high (12 m) round tower was built. The tower, since heightened, still stands as part of today's church.

In AD 1086, twenty years after the Norman conquest of England, the Domesday Book was compiled giving us the first written record of Tasburgh. The village is named Taseburc and its dimensions are given as ten by seven furlongs, there was a watermill and the land was ploughed by five, eight-ox teams. Two hundred and thirty-one acres of arable land are recorded together with eighteen acres of meadowland.

=== Tasburgh in the 19th century ===
Before 1800 most of the houses in the village were timber framed, but a growing shortage of wood, starting in the previous century, had led to the larger houses being built in brick with tiled, rather than thatched, roofs. Examples are Tasburgh House, Watermill House and Tasburgh Hall (then called Tasburgh Lodge). From the early 19th century smaller houses followed suit and early brick buildings can be seen on Low Road between and including the Old Horseshoes public house and Forge Cottage, all built between 1818 and 1840. Other houses and farm buildings of these times were of clay lump construction, surviving specimens include Rookery Cottage and White Horse Farm in Lower Tasburgh.

The Old Rectory standing to the west of the church was built by the Rev Henry Preston in 1840 to replace the ruinous rectory he had inherited at what is today Glebe Cottage on Low Road.

Henry Preston brought education to Tasburgh when he founded a public elementary school on his rectory land alongside Church Hill (in those days, School Hill). The school was officially opened on 15 September 1844.

A vast improvement in the transport of people, goods, livestock and mail came with the opening of the Eastern Union Railway through the area on 12 December 1849. Steam trains linked London, Ipswich, Diss and Norwich, five stopping daily at the local station at Flordon.

In 1863 rail travel to Harleston, Bungay, Beccles and beyond became possible with the completion of the Waveney Valley Railway, which left the main line at Tivetshall Station.

By 1851 the population of 363 at the beginning of the century had grown to 475, and the village contained 113 houses.

=== Early 20th century ===
In the early years of the century Tasburgh continued as a mainly agricultural community. In 1911 the population was 355.

Tasburgh Lodge had been improved and renamed Tasburgh Hall by its owner P. Berney Ficklin. At Rainthorpe Hall, Sir Charles Harvey was spending considerable sums both on the hall and St Mary's Church. The rector from 1897 to 1922 was the Rev Walter Robert Hurd. Sons of these three gentlemen were to have distinguished careers. Horatio Berney Ficklin was a judge Advocate at the Nuremberg Trials of Nazi war criminals. Oliver Harvey became British Ambassador to France and was made Lord Harvey of Tasburgh. Richard Hurd was later Canon Hurd; he had a lasting love of Tasburgh and left a substantial bequest to the church on his death in 1975. Lord Harvey and Canon Hurd are both buried in the churchyard.

The first recorded meeting of Tasburgh parish council was on 18 April 1900. The council was required to meet at least once a year within seven days of 25 March and not before 6 pm. Meetings were held in the school room on a rather irregular basis.

Something of the heavy casualties of the First World War is told by the War Memorial in the churchyard, which records the names of twelve Tasburgh men.

At this time the present Grove Lane was called Coal House Hill, the Coal House standing on the site of the first house below the village hall. Here coal carted from Flordon Station was stored for distribution to the poor by the local charities. These charities had, by 1928, been condensed into three, the Fuel Allotment and Meek's Charity, the Poor's Land and the Clabburn and Bateman Charity. In that year they were all amalgamated into Tasburgh United Charities.

With the fall of France, a parish invasion committee was set up in 1940, and a local unit of the Home Guard was formed under the charge of Ray Page the farmer then resident at Rookery Farm. The Home Guard post was in a building at The Bird in Hand (now the Countryman). Tasburgh Hall became the headquarters of an army searchlight unit, with a searchlight on the lawn and another nearby at Hapton Hall. Later in the war, the army left, and the hall was used to house evacuees.

There was a wartime drama in the village when a spy was captured. He lived in a cottage on Church Hill and toured the district on a bicycle visiting the Horseshoes public house to mix with the soldiers drinking there. One night a Home Guard saw a flashing light from the cottage as enemy planes were flying over. The incident was reported, and shortly after the Tasburgh Home Guard were called out to patrol the area until a light armoured vehicle and army lorries with Military Police arrived. The spy was arrested and a radio transmitter was found in the cottage chimney.

=== Late 20th century ===
In 1945 Tasburgh Women's Institute was relaunched.

From the wartime salvage fund and from many money raising events, including the saving of pennies by the schoolchildren £562 16s 8d had, by May 1947, been raised for a village hall. In 1949 a public meeting was called to discuss proposals for a hall.

On the death of Canon A. E. Gates in 1948 Tasburgh had been the home of only three rectors in 111 years. In the next forty-six years there were to be no less than nine rectors, the first being Rev R. Maudsley. Henceforth Tasburgh rectors were also responsible for Tharston.

After the Second World War, Tasburgh Football Club played on a tiny sloping pitch in Rainthorpe Park, close to the Newton Flotman-Flordon Road. They were not popular with visiting teams, since the pitch was riddled with molehills and rabbit holes. By 1952 the football team had moved to the new playing field, but in their keenness to leave behind the obstacles of their old field they failed to observe that the playing field was littered with sharp flints. Despite compulsory flint-picking sessions for players and officials before every match, players received many nasty cuts, and the club was forced to move yet again. This time they played on a field off Old Hall Farm Loke, where the changing facility comprised an 8 ft (2.4 m) by 6 ft (1.8 m) steel wartime air raid shelter.

An entry in the Eastern Daily Press of 28 August 1953 records the Annual General Meeting of Tasburgh United Football Club, where it was decided to form a combined football and cricket club under the title of Tasburgh United Sports Club. In the meanwhile local youths had developed another form of sport. On the land where Harvey Close now stands a cycle speedway track was developed, and the team racing there in the Depwade League had the proud name of the Tasburgh Tigers.

By 1954 the football pitch at the playing field had been relaid, together with a cricket pitch and practice wicket. The village cricket team played on Saturdays and Sundays for some ten years. In this period football flourished, with three teams and many supporters. In the 1956 / 57 season Tasburgh led the Norwich and District League. Within the next twenty years the football team faded then disbanded.

Flordon Station was closed in 1961 as part of the Beeching cuts after a life of 112 years.

In 1961, the population of Tasburgh was 343, slightly less than the 1911 figure of 355. By 1971, The population had almost doubled to 610.

1980 The new school was opened on 2 June by the Bishop of Norwich. There were sixty-five pupils at the new lower age limit of eight years. In 1981, The population reached 930.

Ken Ransom, together with Roger and Helen Burnett, had the idea to link Tasburgh with a European village, Linden, thirty kilometres from Brussels. Their original idea that the link might be on sporting lines soon changed for one based on two-way family visits. Thus Eurolink was formed.

In 1991, The population of the village reached 1117. Tasburgh had changed in thirty years from not much more than a rural hamlet into a large, mainly suburban, village. On 18 August the village sign was unveiled Following a competition the design was based on the ideas of three pupils of the school.

=== The 21st century ===
2010 (1 May) A group called "Recreation For All," an amalgam of village hall user groups, got together to organise Tasburgh Community Festival. The Festival was scheduled to run for the two days of the Bank Holiday. It was officially opened by ex Norwich City players, Craig Fleming and Darren Huckerby.

2011 (June) and the 2nd Tasburgh Community Festival took place in the grounds of the village hall.

== Governance ==
An electoral ward in the same name exists. This ward stretches north east to Shotesham with a total ward population of 2,399.

== Notable people ==
- Sir Malcolm Bradbury (1932–2000), author. Buried in the churchyard of St Mary's parish church.
- Tanya Burr (1989–present), YouTube vlogger. Grew up in the village.
- Major General Horatio Berney-Ficklin (1892–1961), British Army officer, served in both World War I and World War II.

== Neighbours ==
Nearby villages include Flordon, Hapton, Tharston, Long Stratton, Newton Flotman and Morningthorpe.
