= Swainsthorpe =

Village in Norfolk, England

Coordinates: 52.56117°N 1.27304°E

- Location within Norfolk
- Area: 3.38 km^{2} (1.31 sq mi)
- Population: 360 (2011)
  - Density: 107/km^{2} (280/sq mi)
- OS grid reference: TG219009
- Civil parish: Swainsthorpe
- District: South Norfolk
- Shire county: Norfolk
- Region: East
- Country: England
- Sovereign state: United Kingdom
- Post town: NORWICH
- Postcode district: NR14
- Dialling code: 01508
- Police: Norfolk
- Fire: Norfolk
- Ambulance: East of England
- UK Parliament: South Norfolk

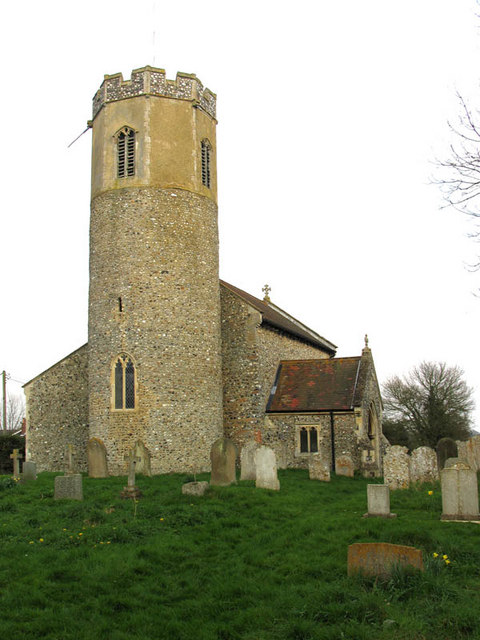
St. Peter's Church

Swainsthorpe is a village in Norfolk, England. It lies on the A140 road, approximately 5 miles south of Norwich, and just north of Newton Flotman. It covers an area of 3.38 km^{2} (1.31 sq mi) and had a population of 374 in 159 households at the 2001 census, the population reducing to 360 at the 2011 Census. The village had two Churches, St.Peter's and St. Mary's, the latter is now in ruins.

The villages name means "Sveinn's outlying farm/settlement".

== Facilities and amenities ==
St Peter's Church sits at the top of Church Road, the entrance to the village, and is one of 124 existing round-tower churches in Norfolk. It is part of the Tas Valley Team Ministry, alongside churches in Newton Flotman, Tasburgh, Tharston, Saxlingham and Shotesham. In 2012, an £80,000 project to re-order the nave and north aisle of the church, providing more space for community events, began.

Children of primary school age living in the village usually attend school in nearby Newton Flotman, while the nearest secondary school is Long Stratton High School.

The village has a public house, which was formerly known as "The Dun Cow", before reopening under a new management and a new name, "Sugarbeat", in July 2014.

Bus services operated by First Norfolk & Suffolk and Simonds of Botesdale provide regular transport links to Norwich and Long Stratton.

== Railway station ==
Swainsthorpe railway station on the Great Eastern Railway, which was the first station south of the Norwich terminus at Norwich Victoria railway station, was closed in 1952.

== Level crossing incidents ==
At 13:05 on Sunday 13 November 2005, the 13:00 One Railways service from Norwich to Diss collided with a car, which according to witnesses had positioned itself in the train's path. The car driver was killed and the car burst into flames on impact. Nobody on board the train was killed. The level crossing was found to be in full working order.

At 06:22 on Thursday 1 March 2007, a One Railways service travelling from Colchester to Norwich collided with a Vauxhall Astra on the crossing. One person in the car, believed to be the driver, died. The train, however, remained upright, did not derail, and there were no injuries on board.

On 26 September 2013 a car hit the barrier at the level crossing, an incident which was witnessed by the driver of the Abellio Greater Anglia train. Nobody was injured.

== Gallery ==
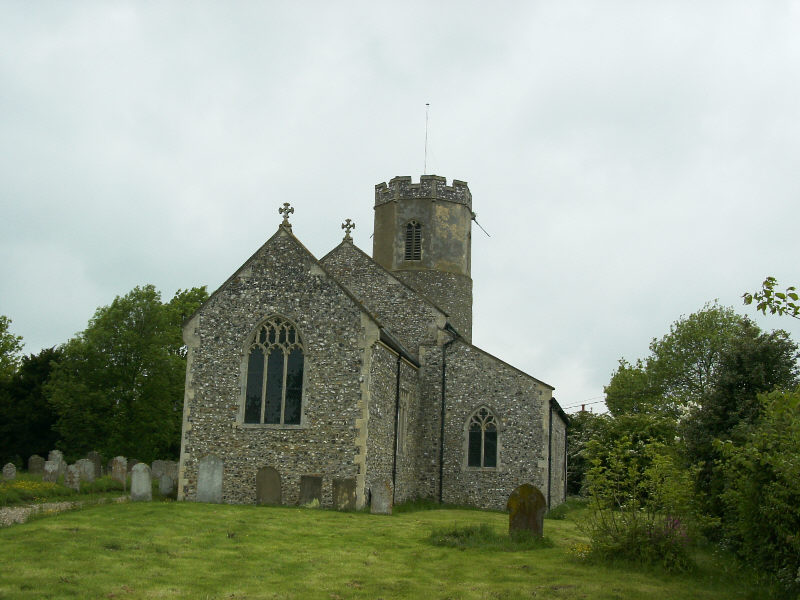
Swainsthorpe St Peter

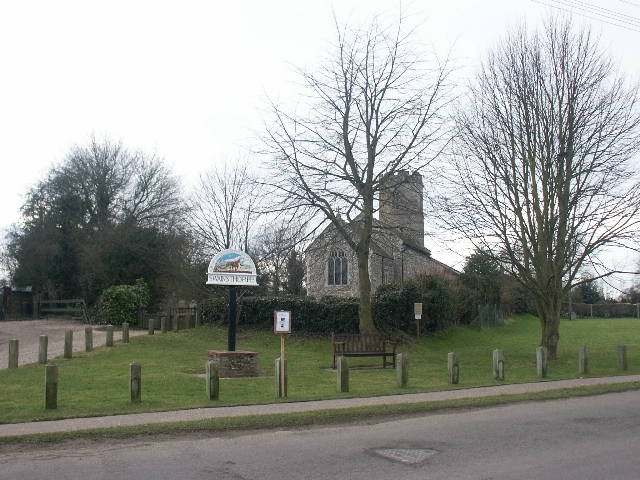
Village green, Church and sign
