= Newton Flotman =

Village in Norfolk, England

Coordinates: 52.537°N 1.261°E

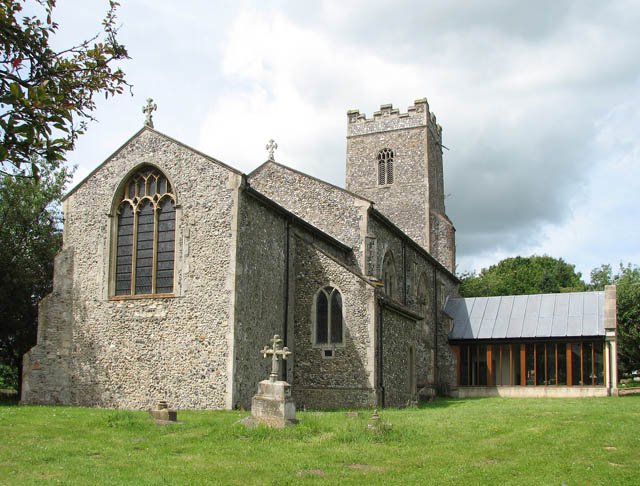
- St Mary's church, Newton Flotman

- Location within Norfolk
- Area: 4.87 km^{2} (1.88 sq mi)
- Population: 1,489 (2001)
  - Density: 306/km^{2} (790/sq mi)
- Civil parish: Newton Flotman
- District: South Norfolk
- Shire county: Norfolk
- Region: East
- Country: England
- Sovereign state: United Kingdom
- Post town: NORWICH
- Postcode district: NR15
- Dialling code: 01508
- Police: Norfolk
- Fire: Norfolk
- Ambulance: East of England
- UK Parliament: South Norfolk

Newton Flotman, meaning new farm or settlement, is a village and civil parish in the English county of Norfolk, lies about 7 miles (11 km) south of Norwich on the A140 road between Tasburgh and Swainsthorpe. The River Tas flows through the village. The area of 4.87 km^{2} (1.88 sq mi) had 1,197 inhabitants in 497 households at the 2001 census, increasing to 1,489 at the 2011 census. For local government it lies in the district of South Norfolk.

== History ==
The de Ferers family held land there in the 13th century, and the village was the home of the Blonumvyll or Blundeville family in the 15th century: Richard & William. Thomas Blundeville (c. 1522–1606), humanist writer, mathematician and inventor of the protractor lived as a country gentleman in the village. Blundeville Manor is the name of a cul de sac in the village although this is not the site of the original home of the Blundevilles. On the north wall of the chancel in Newton Flotman Church is a monument to Sir Thomas Blundeville which shows Sir Thomas and his two daughters and Rose Puttenham and Margaret Johnson his first and second wives.

== Governance ==
An electoral ward of the same name exists. This stretches west to Wreningham, with a total population taken at the 2011 census of 2,658.

== Facilities and amenities ==
Newton Flotman Church, St Mary's, is served by the Tas Valley team ministry along with those of Swainsthorpe, Tasburgh, Tharston, Saxlingham and Shotesham. In 2006, an extension with a kitchen and toilet facilities opened to provide a larger meeting space. In 2018, the church received £87,600 from the Heritage Lottery Fund to repair the church roof, tower and drainage system, install Wi-Fi and train local volunteers to produce films on the church's heritage.

Newton Flotman Primary School caters for children in Newton Flotman, Swainsthorpe and Saxlingham Thorpe. The nearest secondary school is Long Stratton High School.

The village has a village hall, a shop, a motorcycle garage and a theatre school known as ARTS, There is an area known as Smockmill Common, managed by South Norfolk District Council, in Saxlingham Thorpe near Newton Flotman, which is used for recreational purposes. Newton Flotman Football Club is based in the village.

An Elizabethan Country mansion, Rainthorpe Hall, stands by the road between Newton Flotman and Flordon.

== Transport ==
The village stands by the A140 road between Cromer in North Norfolk and Ipswich in Suffolk.

Newton Flotman has regular bus services to Norwich and Long Stratton, operated by First Norfolk & Suffolk, Konectbus and Simonds of Botesdale.

The Great Eastern railway line, which links Norwich and London's Liverpool Street station, passes to the west side of the village at a level crossing, but there is no station; the nearest is at Norwich.

== Notable residents ==
The partronage of Newton Flotman Church was held by the Blunderville family from 1294 for about 400 years. In 1721 it passed to Matthew Long of Dunston Hall and the clergy of the parish had the surname Long until 1948. In 1790, Sarah Long, was patroness and appointed as Rector the Rev. Robert Churchman Kellett on condition that he change his surname to Long, which he did after seven years' consideration. The Longs were also lords of the manor from 1721 to at least 1937.

The Revd Henry Churchman Long is cited in Hansard in matters relating to the Non-Conformist Burial Act which was passed in 1861. Sir Samuel Morton Peto raised the issue of Revd Long’s habit of carting soil from the north side of the churchyard to manure the grounds of his glebe, in the Houses of Parliament in 1861. The soil had been removed from the area of the churchyard which had been used for the burial of Methodists, Nonconformists and the unbaptised.

Brighton's Road, one of the main streets that run through the village, is named after J. L. Brighton, who was chairman of the parish council for 41 years. Brighton was succeeded as chairman by Alan King, who held the post for 14 years. Alan King Playing Field, King's Green, Kingsway and Alan Avenue are all places in the village named after him. David Gibbs followed Alan King as chairman holding the post for 33 years to 2022.
