= Stoke Holy Cross =

Village in Norfolk, England

Coordinates: 52.5693°N 1.29738°E

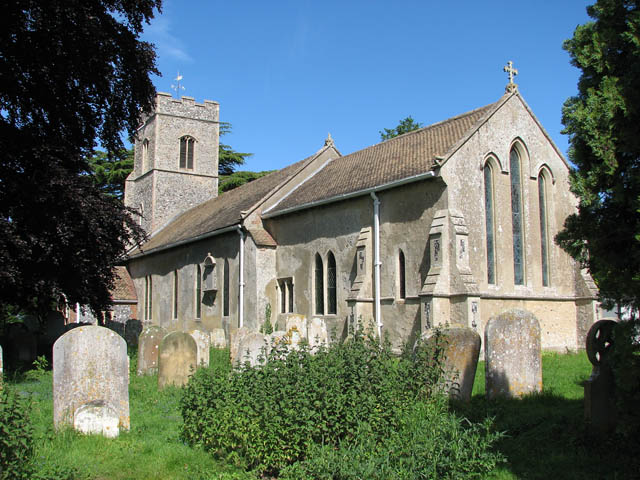
- Holy Cross Church, Stoke Holy Cross

- Location within Norfolk
- Area: 9.27 km^{2} (3.58 sq mi)
- Population: 1,572 (Including Dunston. 2011)
  - Density: 170/km^{2} (440/sq mi)
- OS grid reference: TG235019
- Civil parish: Stoke Holy Cross
- District: South Norfolk
- Shire county: Norfolk
- Region: East
- Country: England
- Sovereign state: United Kingdom
- Post town: NORWICH
- Postcode district: NR14
- Dialling code: 01508
- Police: Norfolk
- Fire: Norfolk
- Ambulance: East of England
- UK Parliament: South Norfolk

Stoke Holy Cross is a village in South Norfolk which lies approximately 4 miles (6.4 km) south of Norwich.

== Geography ==
Stoke sits on the River Tas. It covers an area of 9.27 km^{2} (3.58 sq mi) and had a population of 1,568 in 674 households at the 2001 census.

The village is accessed from the south of Norwich, about a mile east of the A140. West of the village, the parish boundary meets Swainsthorpe along Stoke Lane. The boundary crosses the A140 and the Great Eastern Main Line as Hickling Lane. North of Sprow's Pits it meets Swardeston, and passes west of an electricity substation. The boundary follows the A140 northwards, to the west, and east of Mangreen Hall. A few hundred metres south of the A140/A47 interchange it meets Caistor St Edmund, where the parish includes the Mangreen quarry owned by Lafarge. It crosses the A140 and the railway to meet the River Tas, which it follows southwards, with Dunston (part of the parish) to the west including Dunston Hall and the Dunston Hall Golf Club. It follows Chandler Road, part of Boudica's Way, eastwards and north of Notre Dame Wood. It passes north of Highfield Farm and Narborough House, and Upper Stoke (part of the parish). It passes on the western edge of the transmitting station (a former radar station), and at Stoke Road it meets Poringland. South of Upper Stoke, it passes through Brickle Wood and along the western edge, and follows Brickle Wood through Abbot's Farm and meets Shotesham. It follows Willow Brook to the south of Warren Plantation. It passes to the south-west of Maltkin Farm, meeting Swainsthorpe east of Swainsthorpe Hall.

== History ==
The villages name means 'outlying farm/settlement'. 'Holy Cross' from the dedication of the church.

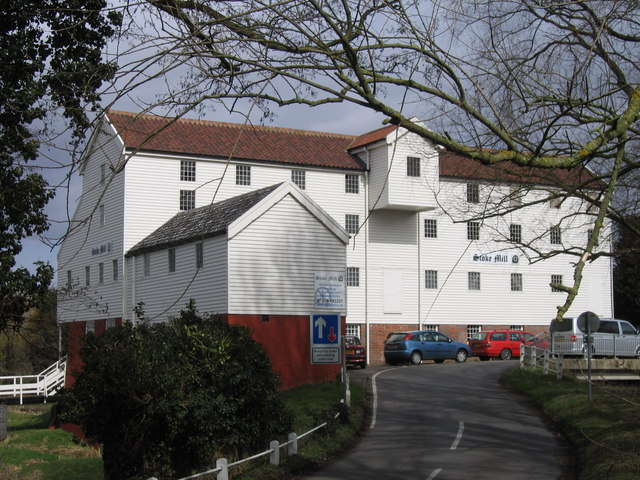
Stoke Holy Cross Mill – home of Colman's Mustard from 1814–62

Stoke Holy Cross mill, to the west of the village, was the location from which Colman's produced their very first mustard products.

Holy Cross church, to the south of the village, being part of the parish of Stoke Holy Cross with Dunston. The village pub is the Wildebeest Arms on Norwich Road.

== Governance ==
An electoral ward in the same name exits. This ward stretches north to Trowse with a total population taken at the 2011 Census of 2,867.

== Radio towers ==
There are two tall radio towers to the east of the village. One is one of three former Chain Home radar towers from the Battle of Britain, then known as RAF Stoke Holy Cross. It is still owned by the Ministry of Defence and is in Poringland.

A larger 'stepped' tower owned by BT sits nearby. This was originally built as part of the British Telecom microwave network but like many such sites is now used for a variety of telecommunications and broadcast services, including FM transmission for BBC Radio Norfolk on 95.1, Greatest Hits Radio Norfolk and North Suffolk on 99.9, Heart East (formerly Radio Broadland) on 102.4, and Hits Radio Norfolk on 106.1. It also carries the digital radio multiplexes NOW Norwich, Digital One and BBC National DAB.

The masts are mostly in the parish of Caistor St Edmund.

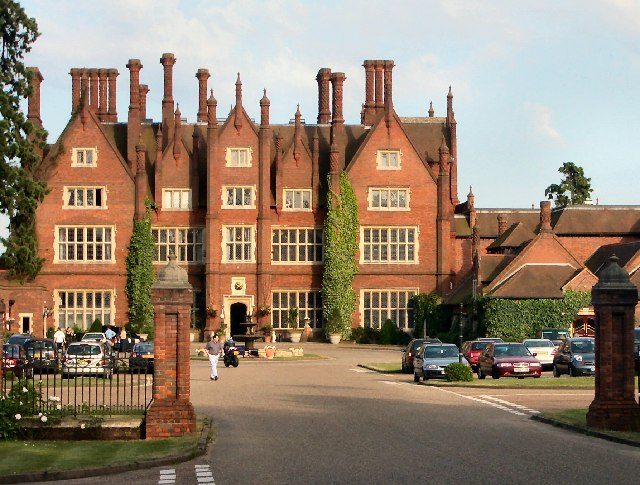
Dunston Hall Hotel
