= Shotesham-Woodton Hornbeam Woods =

Protected area in Norfolk, England

Coordinates: 52.516°N 1.324°E

- Site of Special Scientific Interest
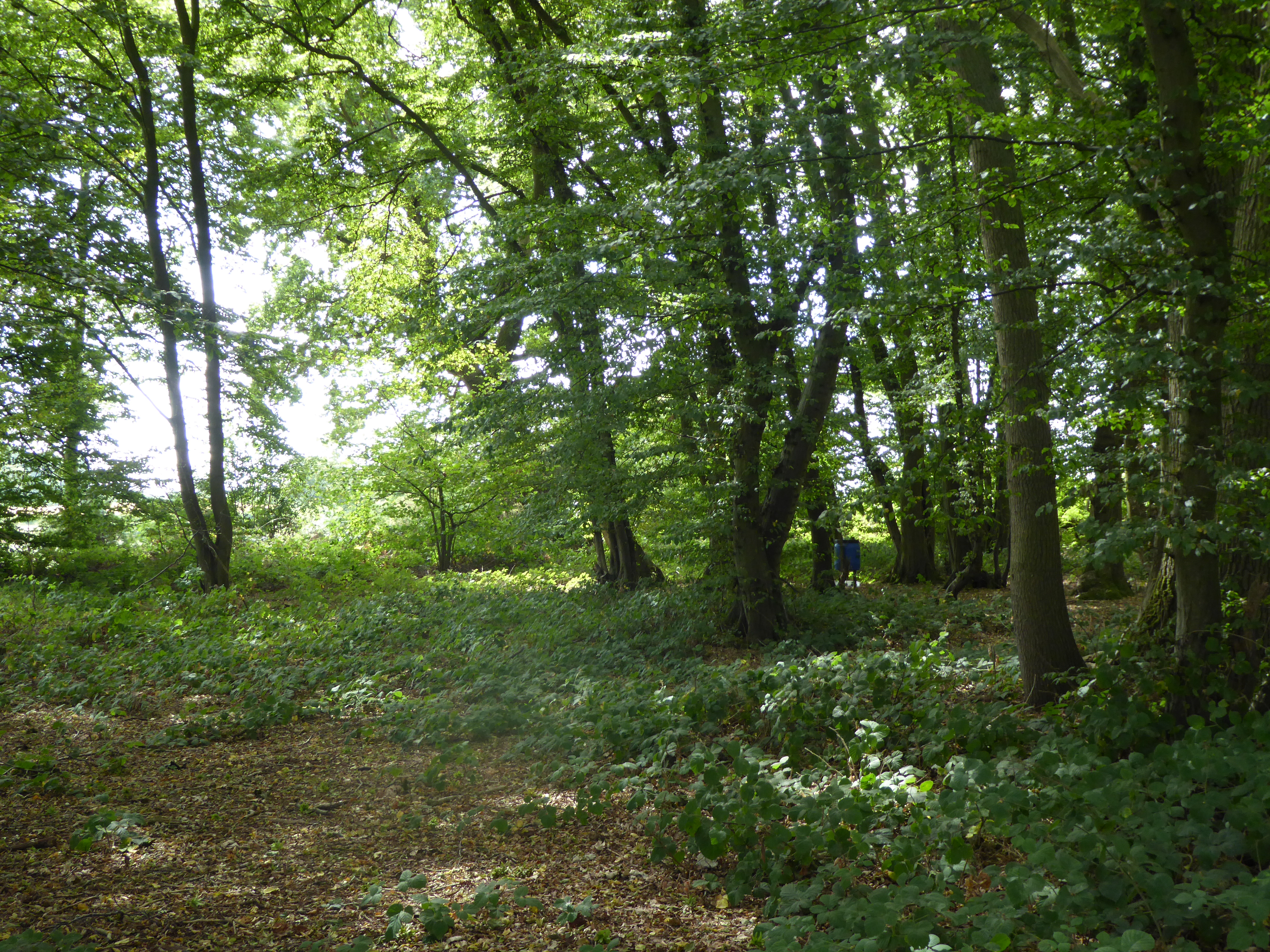
- Shotesham Little Wood
- Location of Shotesham-Woodton Hornbeam Woods.
- Area of search: Norfolk
- Grid reference: TM 256 961
- Interest: Biological
- Area: 40.4 hectares (100 acres)
- Notification date: 1988
- Location map: Magic Map

Shotesham-Woodton Hornbeam Woods is a 40.4-hectare (100-acre) biological Site of Special Scientific Interest east of Newton Flotman in Norfolk, England.

This site comprises four ancient coppices with standard hornbeam woods on boulder clay: Shotesham Little Wood, Saxlingham Grove, Hempnall Little Wood, and Winter's Grove. The ground flora is rich with several uncommon species, such as herb Paris, stinking iris, and greater butterfly orchid.

The woods are private, with no public access.
