= Stratton High School =

Stratton High School may refer to:

- Stratton Senior High School, Stratton, Colorado
- Stratton High School (West Virginia), Beckley, West Virginia
- Long Stratton High School, Long Stratton, Norfolk, England
