= Flordon Common =

Protected area in Norfolk, England

Coordinates: 52.529°N 1.215°E

- Site of Special Scientific Interest
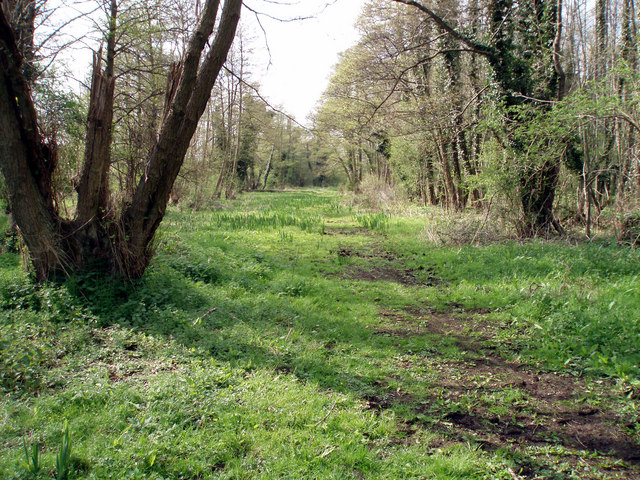
- Location of Flordon Common.
- Area of search: Norfolk
- Grid reference: TM 182 972
- Interest: Biological
- Area: 9.9 hectares (24 acres)
- Notification date: 1985
- Location map: Magic Map

Flordon Common is a 9.9-hectare (24-acre) biological Site of Special Scientific Interest south-east of Wymondham in Norfolk, England. It is a registered common part of the Norfolk Valley Fens Special Area of Conservation.

Springs emerge from this chalk valley of the River Tas, resulting in a species-rich calcareous fen, including the very rare narrow-mouthed whorl snail. On higher ground there is chalk grassland, which is traditionally managed by grazing, allowing the survival of many locally rare plants.

The common is open to the public.

== Land ownership ==
All land within Flordon Common SSSI is owned by the local authority.
