= Dunston Hall Hotel =

Grade II listed building in Norfolk, England

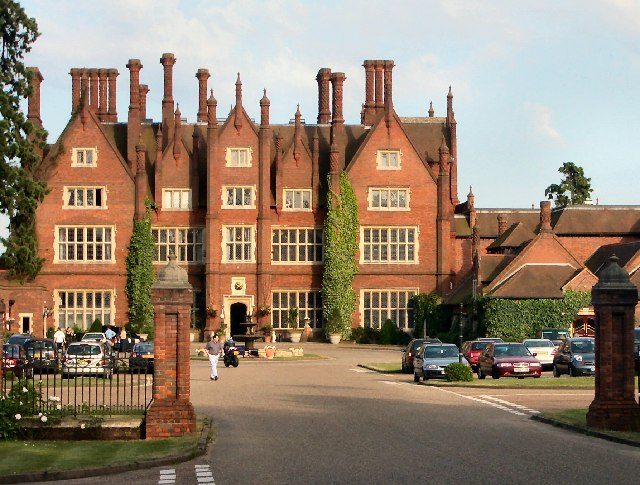
- Front of the hotel in 2005

- Norfolk
- Hotel chain: QHotels Collection

General information
- Architectural style: Elizabethan Revival
- Location: Dunston, Norfolk, England, Ipswich Road, Dunston, Norwich NR14 8PQ
- Coordinates: 52°34′15.92″N 1°16′55.39″E
- Construction started: 1859
- Completed: 1878

Technical details
- Floor count: 3 with lifts

Design and construction
- Architects: John Chessell Buckler; Edward Boardman

Other information
- Number of rooms: 169 en-suite bedrooms
- Number of restaurants: 2
- Facilities: Indoor swimming pool 18-hole golf course Floodlit driving range Football pitch Spa and gym
- Parking: 500 spaces

Website
- dunstonhallhotel.co.uk

Listed Building – Grade II
- Designated: 5 September 1975
- Reference no.: 1373206

Dunston Hall Hotel is an Elizabethan Revival style Grade II listed building in the village of Dunston, Norfolk, England. It is part of the QHotels Collection group of hotels and has an AA four-star rating.

== Location ==
The hotel is 4.8 miles (7.7 km) south of the city of Norwich and is located on the A140 Norwich to Ipswich road, just south of the Harford interchange with the A47

== History ==
The current Dunston Hall was built for Robert Kellett Longe. Construction began in 1859 to the designs of the architect John Chessell Buckler and was completed by Edward Boardman in 1878. It occupies the site of an older building, an early 17th-century house, although records show that there were also two previous post-medieval halls which stood slightly to the north and east on the site of the present Hall Farm.

The house was bought in 1991 by Keith Shaw, a local businessman, and it opened as a hotel in 1993.

== The residents ==
Robert Kellett Longe (1804–1874), who built the Hall in 1859, was born in 1804. He was the son of the Reverend Robert Churchman Longe (1761–1841), who had inherited Dunston Hall from a distant relative in 1797. At that time, there was a large 17th-century mansion on the property.

He was educated at the University of Cambridge and in 1832 graduated with a Master of Arts degree. In 1841 when his father died he inherited Dunston Hall and undertook the running of the estate. In 1843 he married Maria Louisa Fortescue, daughter of William Fortescue of Writtle Lodge in Essex. The couple had three sons but unfortunately Maria died three years after their marriage and Robert was obliged to raise his children alone. The 1851 Census shows the family in the old hall. Robert and his three sons are there with the housekeeper, the butler and footman, two housemaids, two nursemaids, two kitchen maids, dairy maid, laundry maid and coachman.

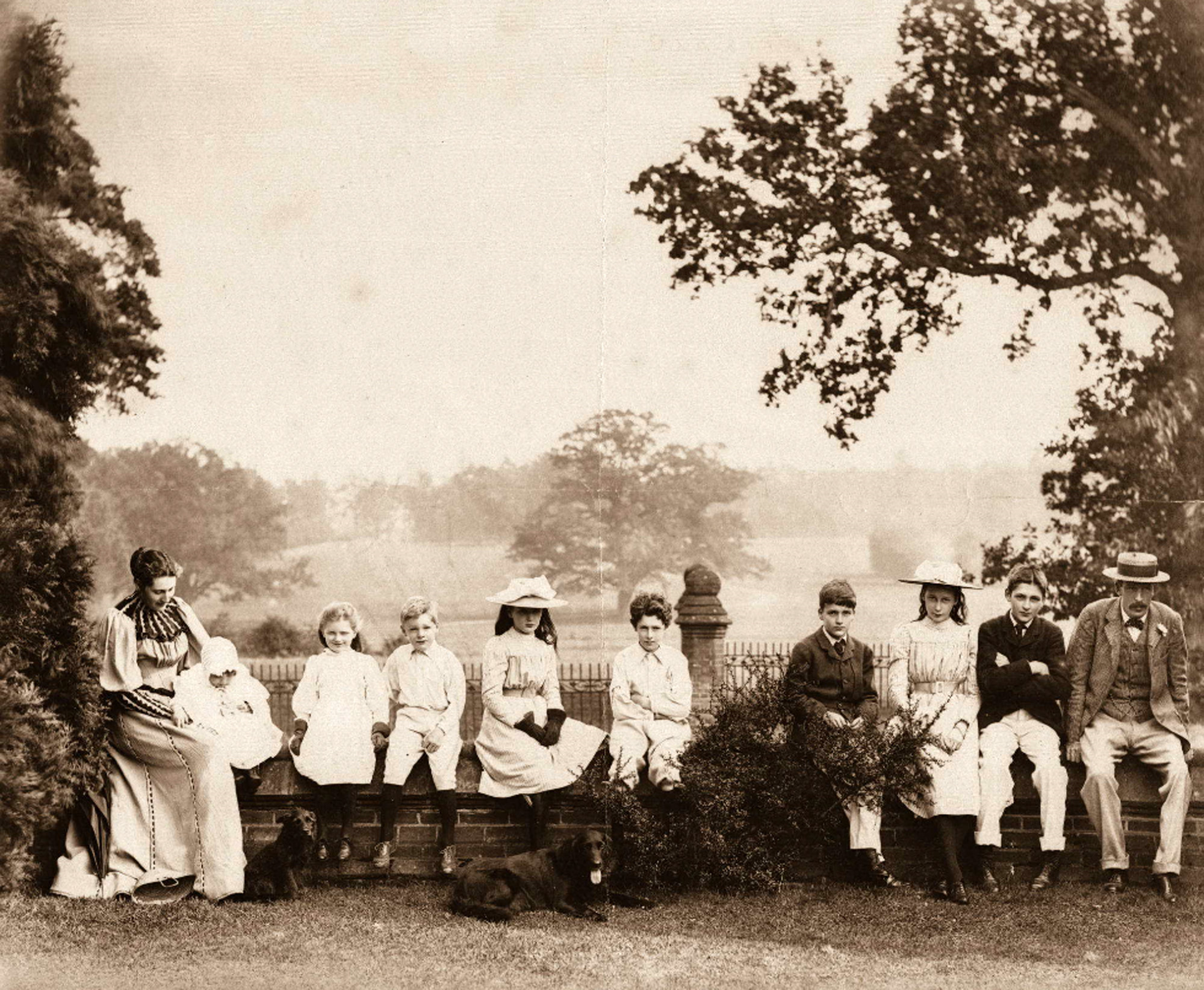
The Buxton family, 1894 at the back of Dunston Hall

In 1859 Robert commissioned the architect John Chessell Buckler to build a new house. It seems that the old hall was demolished after its completion as a notice appeared in a newspaper in 1860 advertising for sale building materials from “Dunston Old Hall”.

Robert died in 1874 and his son Fortescue Walter Kellett Longe (1844-1934) inherited the property. He did not live there long and for many years the house was rented to tenants.

One of the most notable tenants was Lt.-Col. Sir Edmund Broughton Knowles Lacon, 4th Baronet (184–1899), who used the house as a country residence from about 1883 until 1893. At this time, he was married to his second wife, Florence Amelia Foster.

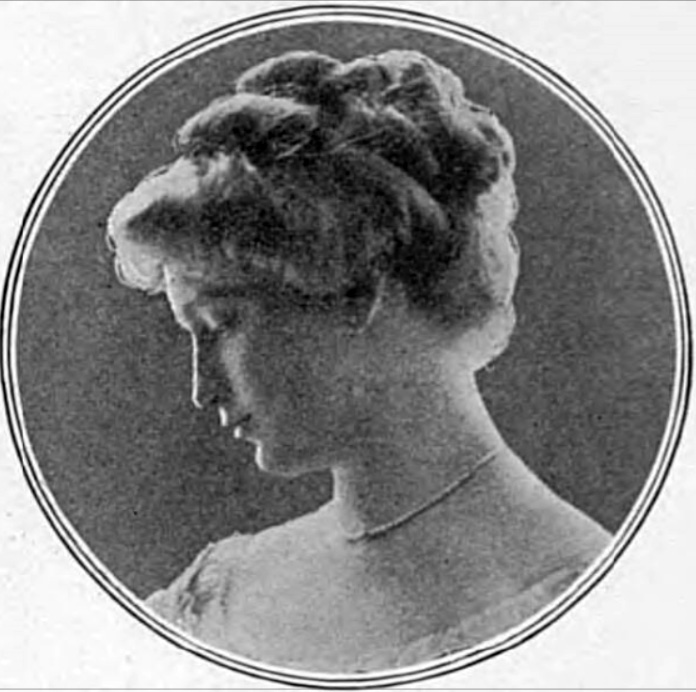
Avery Buxton

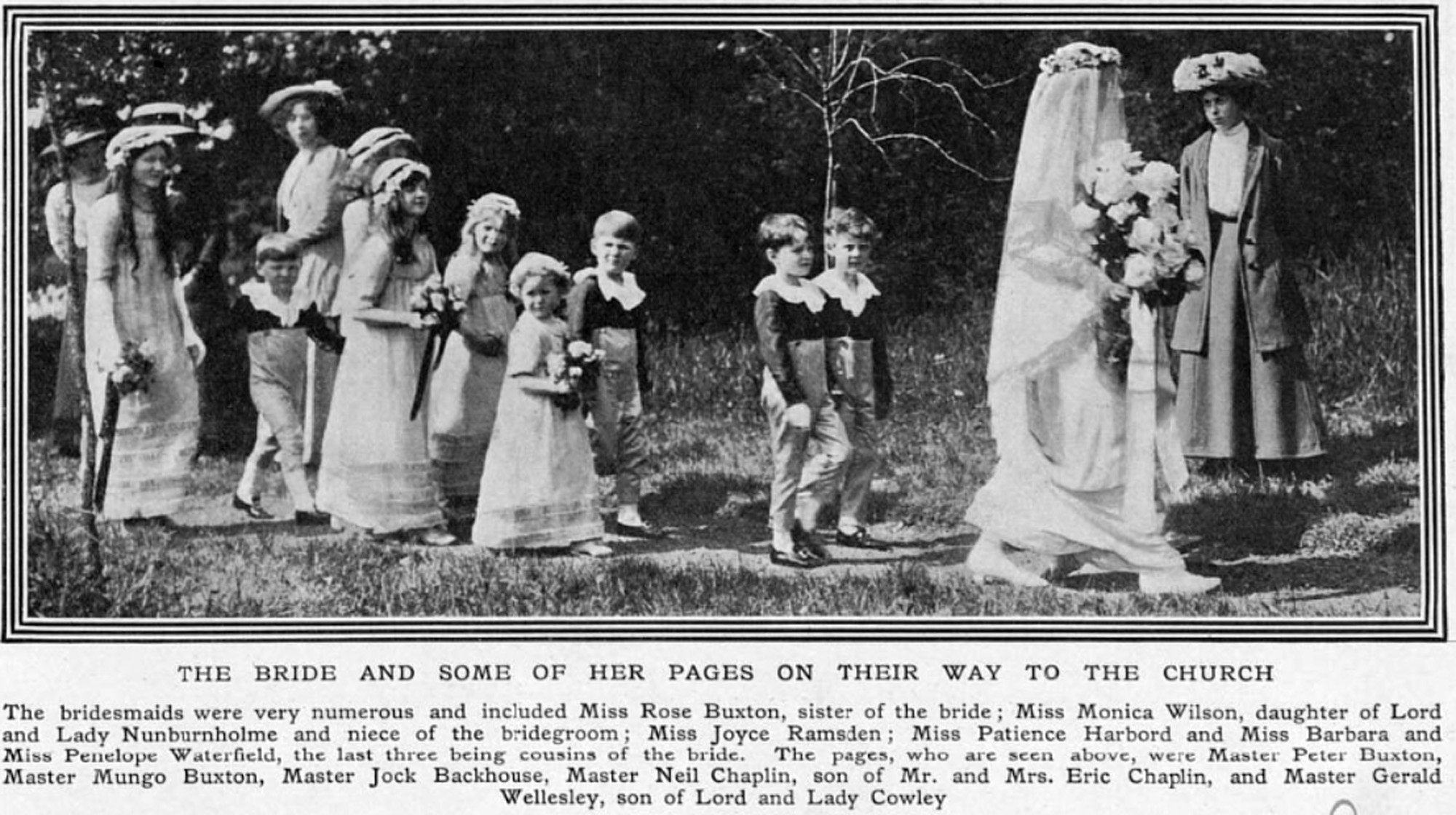
The wedding of Avery Buxton at Dunston Hall, 1911

After he left in 1893 Geoffrey Fowell Buxton and his family rented Dunston Hall for almost thirty years until 1921. A photo of the family in 1894 is shown.

Geoffrey Fowell (1852–1929) was a director of Barclays Bank and Mayor of Norwich in 1903. He was born in 1852. He was the third son of Thomas Fowell Buxton of Easneye Mansion (now All Nations Christian College) near Ware, Hertfordshire. In 1874 he gained a Bachelor of Arts degree at the University of Cambridge. He married Mary Harbord, daughter of Rev John Harbord in 1878. The couple had nine children, eight of whom are shown in the photograph.

In 1911 his daughter Avery Buxton married Guy Greville Wilson, who was the son of Sir Charles Henry Wilson, 1st Baron Nunburnholme. The wedding was held at Dunston Church and the reception at Dunston Hall. A description of the event in the magazine “The Tatler” is as follows.

"Dunston Church, Norwich, was beautifully decorated with white lilac and lilies of the valley on the occasion of the wedding of the Hon. Guy Greville Wilson, D.S.O., M.P. for West Hull, and Miss Avery Buxton, third daughter of Mr. and Mrs. Geoffrey Buxton of Dunston Hall, Norwich. The ceremony was performed by the Rev. Arthur Buxton, cousin of the bride, assisted by the Rey. W. Morley Smith. The bride was given away by her father, and looked very graceful in an Empire gown of soft ivory satin, the corsage being entirely of Brussels lace, which continued down the back of the skirt, while instead of a bouquet she carried a Brussels lace fan, the gift of her mother, to match the lace of her veil.

"The bridal procession was formed of six bridesmaids, gowned in azalea- shaded chiffon with pink shoes and stockings and lace caps, and six small pages in suits of buff and black velvet, the coats of the latter material having white lisse frills at the throat. They carried their black hats and wore diamond-and-coral pins, the gift of the bridegroom, while the bridesmaids had bouquets of yellow roses tied with black velvet ribbons and wore coral necklaces, their presents from the bridegroom.

Captain Halliday, 11th Hussars, supported the bridegroom as best man. Among the many guests invited to the wedding were Florence Lady Nunburnholme, Lord and Lady Nunburnholme, the Earl and Countess of Chesterfield, Earl and Countess Cowley, Lord Suffield, the Earl and Countess of Leicester, the Dowager Countess of Leicester, Lord and Lady Hastings, Mr. and Mrs. Reginald McKenna, and Lord and Lady Hillingdon. After the reception the Hon. Guy and Mrs. Wilson left for their honeymoon, which they are spending on the Continent."

In about 1921 the Buxton family moved to Hoveton Hall. Soon after, Edward Fortescue Long (1876–1955), who was the nephew of the then-owner Fortescue Walter Kellett Long, moved into the house. He was a bachelor and lived there for many years. When his uncle Fortescue died in 1934 he inherited the house. He died in 1955, and several years later, Dunston Hall was sold.
