= Hapton =

Hapton may refer to:

- Hapton, Lancashire, England
- Hapton, Norfolk, England
