= Samuel King =

Samuel King may refer to:

- Sam King (golfer) (Samuel Leonard King, 1911–2003), English professional golfer
- Sam King (baseball) (Samuel Warren King, 1852–1922), Major League Baseball first baseman
- Sam King (cricketer) (Samuel Isaac Michael King, born 2003), English cricketer
- Sam King (American football), American football player
- Sam Beaver King (1926–2016), first black mayor of Southwark, London
- Samuel King (artist) (1748–1819), miniaturist and instructor
- Samuel King (minister) (1775–1842), Presbyterian minister
- Samuel Archer King (1828–1914), balloonist
- Samuel Pailthorpe King (1916–2010), American lawyer and judge on the United States District Court for the District of Hawaii
- Samuel Ward King (1786–1851), Governor of Rhode Island
- Samuel Wilder King (1886–1959), eleventh Territorial Governor of Hawaii
- Samuel William King (1821–1868), English geologist
- Samuel G. King (1816–1899), mayor of Philadelphia
- "Samuel P. King" and "Samuel S. King", aliases used by Calvin Fairbank while aiding escaped slaves

== See also ==
- Samuel King's School, Alston, Cumbria, England
