= Listed buildings in Long Stratton =

Historic structures in Norfolk, England

Long Stratton is a town and civil parish in the South Norfolk district of Norfolk, England. It contains 66 listed buildings that are recorded in the National Heritage List for England. Of these two are grade I, two are grade II* and 62 are grade II.

This list is based on the information retrieved online from Historic England.

== Key ==
| Grade | Criteria |
|---|---|
| I | Buildings that are of exceptional interest |
| II* | Particularly important buildings of more than special interest |
| II | Buildings that are of special interest |

== Listing ==
| Name | Grade | Location | Type | Completed (Note: The date given is the date used by Historic England as significant for the initial building or that of an important part in the structure's description.) | Date designated | Grid ref. (Note: The grid reference is based on the British national grid reference system, sometimes known as OSGB36, used by the Ordnance Survey.) Geo-coordinates | Notes | Entry number (Note: The "List Entry Number" is a unique number assigned to each listed building and scheduled monument by Historic England.) | Image | Wikidata |
|---|---|---|---|---|---|---|---|---|---|---|
| Long Stratton War Memorial | II | | war memorial | | 14 January 2020 | TM1963792292; 52°29′04″N 1°14′00″E | | 1468064 | Long Stratton War Memorial More images | Q97449056 |
| Premises Occupied by G A Dunthorpe, Chemist | II | Chemist, The Street | | | 21 November 1974 | TM1974192739; 52°29′18″N 1°14′06″E | | 1304089 | Upload Photo | Q26591099 |
| Barn North of the Old Rectory | II | Church Lane, Stratton St Michael | | | 21 September 1976 | TM2051093640; 52°29′46″N 1°14′49″E | | 1050306 | Upload Photo | Q26302296 |
| Church Farmhouse | II | Church Lane, Stratton St Michael | | | 11 September 1951 | TM2057793609; 52°29′45″N 1°14′53″E | | 1153545 | Upload Photo | Q26446279 |
| Church of St Michael | I | Church Lane, Stratton St Michael | church building | | 26 June 1981 | TM2048093614; 52°29′45″N 1°14′48″E | | 1304267 | Church of St Michael More images | Q17537651 |
| Pair of Houses Owned by Mr B R Weeden | II | Church Lane, Stratton St Michael | | | 21 September 1976 | TM2014493746; 52°29′50″N 1°14′30″E | | 1153535 | Upload Photo | Q26446269 |
| The Old Rectory | II* | Church Lane, Stratton St Michael | | | 7 December 1959 | TM2052093581; 52°29′44″N 1°14′50″E | | 1373264 | Upload Photo | Q17533174 |
| Crowgreen Farmhouse | II | Crow Green | | | 21 September 1976 | TM1968990016; 52°27′50″N 1°13′57″E | | 1050307 | Upload Photo | Q26302297 |
| St Mary's Rectory | II | Flowerpot Lane | | | 11 September 1951 | TM1954892325; 52°29′05″N 1°13′55″E | | 1153550 | Upload Photo | Q26446284 |
| Premises Occupied by A.e. Merrison, Grocer | II | Grocer, The Street | | | 21 November 1974 | TM1972692845; 52°29′21″N 1°14′06″E | | 1153794 | Upload Photo | Q26446537 |
| Belvedere Stores and 2 Adjoining Cottages | II | Ipswich Road | | | 21 November 1974 | TM1964692216; 52°29′01″N 1°14′00″E | | 1050308 | Upload Photo | Q26302298 |
| Cherry Tree Farmhouse | II | Ipswich Road | | | 21 September 1976 | TM1953191465; 52°28′37″N 1°13′52″E | | 1153568 | Upload Photo | Q26446300 |
| Church of St Mary | I | Ipswich Road | church building | | 7 December 1959 | TM1968592268; 52°29′03″N 1°14′02″E | | 1304232 | Church of St Mary More images | Q17537647 |
| Corfe Cottage | II | Ipswich Road | | | 21 September 1976 | TM1962392255; 52°29′02″N 1°13′59″E | | 1153603 | Upload Photo | Q26446332 |
| Corfe Lodge | II | Ipswich Road | | | 21 September 1976 | TM1962092247; 52°29′02″N 1°13′59″E | | 1050310 | Upload Photo | Q26302300 |
| Griffin Cottage | II | Ipswich Road | | | 21 September 1976 | TM1966592328; 52°29′05″N 1°14′01″E | | 1373265 | Upload Photo | Q26654262 |
| Limetree Farmhouse | II | Ipswich Road | | | 21 September 1976 | TM1933290173; 52°27′56″N 1°13′39″E | | 1153579 | Upload Photo | Q26446310 |
| Lodge Farmhouse | II | Ipswich Road | | | 21 September 1976 | TM1946491063; 52°28′24″N 1°13′48″E | | 1373266 | Upload Photo | Q26654263 |
| Long Stratton Church School | II | Ipswich Road | school building | | 21 September 1976 | TM1963492336; 52°29′05″N 1°14′00″E | | 1373267 | Long Stratton Church School More images | Q26654264 |
| Poplars Farmhouse | II | Ipswich Road | | | 21 September 1976 | TM1943991375; 52°28′34″N 1°13′47″E | | 1050311 | Upload Photo | Q26302301 |
| Shrub Cottage | II | Ipswich Road | | | 21 September 1976 | TM1963492359; 52°29′06″N 1°14′00″E | | 1050309 | Upload Photo | Q26302299 |
| The Cottage | II | Ipswich Road | | | 21 September 1976 | TM1939490864; 52°28′18″N 1°13′44″E | | 1373268 | Upload Photo | Q26654265 |
| The Deals | II | Ipswich Road | | | 21 September 1976 | TM1957491978; 52°28′53″N 1°13′56″E | | 1304222 | Upload Photo | Q26591225 |
| Wild Rose Farmhouse | II | Ipswich Road | | | 21 September 1976 | TM1934390549; 52°28′08″N 1°13′40″E | | 1304199 | Upload Photo | Q26591204 |
| Windmill | II | Long Stratton Mills | | | 21 September 1976 | TM2071692084; 52°28′55″N 1°14′56″E | | 1050312 | Windmill More images | Q26302302 |
| Cottage Occupied by Mr and Mrs Woods, North-west of Church of St Michael | II | North-west Of Church Of St Michael, Church Lane, Stratton St Michael | | | 29 September 1976 | TM2033293695; 52°29′48″N 1°14′40″E | | 1050305 | Upload Photo | Q26302295 |
| Cottage North of Orchardleigh | II | Norwich Road | | | 15 May 1997 | TM1998593475; 52°29′41″N 1°14′21″E | | 1245359 | Upload Photo | Q26537906 |
| Cottage Occupied by Mrs Rye | II | Norwich Road | | | 21 September 1976 | TM2013893771; 52°29′51″N 1°14′30″E | | 1050315 | Upload Photo | Q26302305 |
| Orchardleigh | II | Norwich Road | | | 21 September 1976 | TM1998293457; 52°29′41″N 1°14′21″E | | 1153679 | Upload Photo | Q26446405 |
| Pair of Cottages One Occupied by Mr and Mrs Groves Immediately South of Lower Cottages | II | Norwich Road | | | 21 September 1976 | TM1997593553; 52°29′44″N 1°14′21″E | | 1153668 | Upload Photo | Q26446394 |
| Thatched Cottage | II | Norwich Road | | | 21 September 1976 | TM1979893051; 52°29′28″N 1°14′10″E | | 1373269 | Upload Photo | Q26654266 |
| The Cedars | II | Norwich Road | | | 11 September 1951 | TM2019694075; 52°30′00″N 1°14′34″E | | 1304177 | Upload Photo | Q26591182 |
| The Rectory | II | Norwich Road | | | 21 September 1976 | TM2004893337; 52°29′37″N 1°14′24″E | | 1050314 | Upload Photo | Q26302304 |
| The Red Cottage | II | Norwich Road | | | 21 September 1976 | TM2008193876; 52°29′54″N 1°14′27″E | | 1153675 | Upload Photo | Q26446401 |
| Walnut Tree Cottage and Low Cottage | II | Norwich Road, NR15 2PX | | | 21 September 1976 | TM1999293639; 52°29′47″N 1°14′22″E | | 1050313 | Upload Photo | Q26302303 |
| Farmhouse Owned by Mr Leeder, South-west of Wood Green | II | South-west Of Wood Green, Wood Green | | | 21 September 1976 | TM2057191157; 52°28′26″N 1°14′47″E | | 1153978 | Upload Photo | Q26446784 |
| Mill Farmhouse | II | Stratton Bridge | | | 21 September 1976 | TM2089694990; 52°30′29″N 1°15′13″E | | 1050316 | Upload Photo | Q26302306 |
| Greenwood Cottage | II | Stratton Lane | | | 21 September 1976 | TM2097092631; 52°29′13″N 1°15′11″E | | 1050274 | Upload Photo | Q26302265 |
| Rhees Green Cottage | II | Stratton Lane | | | 21 September 1976 | TM2073192634; 52°29′13″N 1°14′59″E | | 1304179 | Upload Photo | Q26591184 |
| Hillside Cottages | II | 1, 2 and 3, The Street | | | 21 September 1976 | TM1977492968; 52°29′25″N 1°14′09″E | | 1050283 | Upload Photo | Q26302272 |
| Antique Shop Jubilee House Restaurant Norfolk Craft Shop | II | The Street | | | 21 September 1976 | TM1969092681; 52°29′16″N 1°14′04″E | | 1373289 | Upload Photo | Q26654285 |
| Ashfords Grimbles General Store the Cottage | II | The Street | | | 7 December 1959 | TM1972992712; 52°29′17″N 1°14′06″E | | 1050286 | Upload Photo | Q26302275 |
| Carters Post Office the Maltings | II | The Street | | | 21 September 1976 | TM1975692899; 52°29′23″N 1°14′08″E | | 1153797 | Upload Photo | Q26446542 |
| Chestnut View | II | The Street | | | 21 November 1974 | TM1977292948; 52°29′25″N 1°14′09″E | | 1153857 | Upload Photo | Q26446623 |
| Guild House | II | The Street | | | 21 September 1976 | TM1977692834; 52°29′21″N 1°14′08″E | | 1050284 | Upload Photo | Q26302273 |
| Hayden House the Cottage | II | The Street | | | 21 September 1976 | TM1966592493; 52°29′10″N 1°14′02″E | | 1050277 | Upload Photo | Q26302267 |
| Longuenil Tupsley | II | The Street | | | 21 November 1974 | TM1975292757; 52°29′18″N 1°14′07″E | | 1050285 | Upload Photo | Q26302274 |
| Melrose | II | The Street | | | 21 September 1976 | TM1975092946; 52°29′25″N 1°14′07″E | | 1050282 | Upload Photo | Q26302271 |
| Netherton House and Adjoining Pair of Cottages to North | II | The Street | | | 21 November 1974 | TM1971892783; 52°29′19″N 1°14′05″E | | 1050280 | Upload Photo | Q26302269 |
| Premises Occupied by C R Pettengell and Son and Adjoining Cottages to South | II | The Street | | | 21 November 1974 | TM1973492727; 52°29′17″N 1°14′06″E | | 1373254 | Upload Photo | Q26654252 |
| Premises Occupied by D.s. Warnes and Sons and Cottage Adjoining to East | II | The Street | | | 21 November 1974 | TM1969892652; 52°29′15″N 1°14′04″E | | 1050275 | Upload Photo | Q26302266 |
| Premises Owned by Mr Tummore and G.j. Cracknell and Son | II* | The Street | | | 7 December 1959 | TM1969192636; 52°29′15″N 1°14′04″E | | 1050276 | Upload Photo | Q17531581 |
| Row of Cottages Immediately North of the Old Court House Owned by Mr B L Leeder | II | The Street | | | 21 September 1976 | TM1977492886; 52°29′23″N 1°14′08″E | | 1373253 | Upload Photo | Q26654251 |
| Stables South-west of Netherton House | II | The Street | | | 21 September 1976 | TM1968492710; 52°29′17″N 1°14′03″E | | 1373291 | Upload Photo | Q26654287 |
| The Angel Public House | II | The Street | | | 21 September 1976 | TM1970092710; 52°29′17″N 1°14′04″E | | 1050279 | Upload Photo | Q26302268 |
| The Old Court House | II | The Street | | | 21 September 1976 | TM1977192866; 52°29′22″N 1°14′08″E | | 1153893 | Upload Photo | Q26446674 |
| The Queen's Head Public House | II | The Street | | | 21 November 1974 | TM1974592876; 52°29′22″N 1°14′07″E | | 1050281 | Upload Photo | Q26302270 |
| The Retreat and Two Adjoining Tenements | II | The Street | | | 21 November 1974 | TM1970592658; 52°29′15″N 1°14′04″E | | 1153936 | Upload Photo | Q26446731 |
| The Swan Inn | II | The Street | | | 11 September 1951 | TM1971392748; 52°29′18″N 1°14′05″E | | 1373290 | The Swan Inn More images | Q26654286 |
| Tuckaway Cottage and Adjoining Cottage to North | II | The Street | | | 21 September 1976 | TM1975192950; 52°29′25″N 1°14′07″E | | 1373292 | Upload Photo | Q26654288 |
| Wesleyan Chapel | II | The Street | | | 21 September 1976 | TM1977692973; 52°29′25″N 1°14′09″E | | 1153876 | Upload Photo | Q26446650 |
| Mayfield Farmhouse | II | Wood Green | | | 21 September 1976 | TM2122391688; 52°28′42″N 1°15′22″E | | 1153991 | Upload Photo | Q26446798 |
| Mr Cowan's Cottages (in Row of Cottages on South of Wood Green) | II | Wood Green | | | 21 September 1976 | TM2074891197; 52°28′27″N 1°14′56″E | | 1050288 | Upload Photo | Q26302278 |
| The Thatch | II | Wood Green | | | 21 September 1976 | TM2083691442; 52°28′34″N 1°15′01″E | | 1373255 | Upload Photo | Q26654253 |
| Woodgreen Cottage | II | Wood Green | | | 21 September 1976 | TM2071991215; 52°28′27″N 1°14′55″E | | 1050287 | Upload Photo | Q26302276 |
| Woodgreen Farmhouse | II | Wood Green | | | 21 September 1976 | TM2058891532; 52°28′38″N 1°14′48″E | | 1153962 | Upload Photo | Q26446765 |

== See also ==
- Grade I listed buildings in Norfolk
- Grade II* listed buildings in Norfolk

== Sources ==
- Wilson, Bill; Pevsner, Nikolaus (1999) [1962], Norfolk 2: North-West and South, The Buildings of England, New Haven and London: Yale University Press, ISBN 978-0-300-09657-6
