= Flordon =

Village in south Norfolk, England

Coordinates: 52.52641°N 1.22648°E

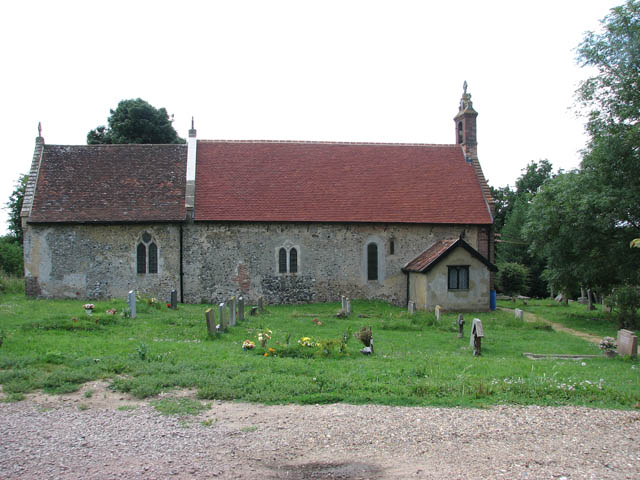
- St Michael's Church, Flordon

- Location within Norfolk
- Area: 3.80 sq mi (9.8 km^{2})
- Population: 298 (2021 census)
  - Density: 78/sq mi (30/km^{2})
- OS grid reference: TM189969
  - London: 90 miles (140 km)
- Civil parish: Flordon
- District: South Norfolk
- Shire county: Norfolk
- Region: East
- Country: England
- Sovereign state: United Kingdom
- Post town: NORWICH
- Postcode district: NR15
- Dialling code: 01508
- Police: Norfolk
- Fire: Norfolk
- Ambulance: East of England
- UK Parliament: South Norfolk

Flordon is a village and civil parish in the English county of Norfolk.

Flordon is located 5.4 miles (8.7 km) south-east of Wymondham and 7.6 miles (12.2 km) south-west of Norwich.

== History ==
Although the certain meaning of Flordon's name is uncertain, it is of Anglo-Saxon origin and directly translates from Old English as 'floor hill'.

In the Domesday Book, Flordon is listed as a settlement of 48 households in the hundred of Humbleyard. In 1086, the village was part of the East Anglian estates of Bishop Odo of Bayeux, Alan of Brittany, Roger Bigod and Godric the Steward.

Flordon Mill stood in the village from the medieval period until its demolition in the 1920s. The mill was powered by water and stood on a small tributary of the River Tas.

Flordon Hall is a timber framed, seventeenth century manor-house that was built on the ruins of an earlier building.

Flordon Railway Station opened in 1849, as a stop on the Great Eastern Main Line between London Liverpool Street and Norwich. The station closed in 1966, as part of the Beeching Cuts, although inter-city services continue to pass through the village.

== Geography ==
According to the 2021 census, Flordon has a total population of 298 people which demonstrates an increase from the 281 people listed in the 2011 census.

Taswood Lakes operate as a set of public fisheries close to the village; the lakes are mainly used for fishing for carp.

== St. Michael's Church ==
Flordon's parish church is dedicated to Saint Michael and was largely rebuilt in the Nineteenth Century. St. Michael's is located within the village on St. Michael's View and has been Grade II listed since 1959.

St. Michael's was likely once one of Norfolk's round-tower churches and was heavily restored in the Victorian era.

== Rainthorpe Hall ==
Rainthorpe Hall is located within the Parish of Flordon and was built in its current form in the late sixteenth century by the lawyer Thomas Baxter. Today, the hall is a Grade I listed building and is on the Register of Historic Parks and Gardens of Special Historic Interest in England.

== Amenities ==
Tas Valley Mushrooms is based within the parish.

Hethersett and Tas Cricket Club play their home games within the parish boundaries and field four men's teams and one women's team. The first XI competes in the Norfolk Cricket Alliance's Division One and were placed in second place in the 2022 season.

== Governance ==
Flordon is part of the electoral ward of Mulbarton & Stoke Holy Cross for local elections and is part of the district of South Norfolk.

The village's national constituency is South Norfolk which has been represented by the Labour's Ben Goldsborough MP since 2024.

== War memorial ==
Flordon's war memorial takes the form of two brass plaques located inside St. Michael's Church. The memorial lists the following names for the First World War:

Rank	Name	Unit	Date of death	Burial/Commemoration
LCpl.	John F. Hazell	3rd Bn., Norfolk Regiment	18 Sep. 1916	St. Mary's Churchyard
Pte.	Albert G. Hazel	2nd Bn., Border Regiment	26 Oct. 1917	Tyne Cot
Pte.	James Stebbings	5th (Mounted) Bn., CEF	5 Dec. 1916	Villers Station Cemetery
Pte.	Frank H. Smith	1/5th Bn., Norfolk Regiment	12 Aug. 1915	Helles Memorial
Pte.	Arthur E. Thompson	1/5th Bn., Norfolk Regt.	12 Aug. 1915	Helles Memorial
Pte.	Lewis Brown	9th Bn., Northumberland Fusiliers	12 Sep. 1917	Tincourt Cemetery
Pte.	James H. Savory	5th Bn., Yorkshire Regiment	27 May 1918	Soissons Memorial

The following names were added following the Second World War:

Rank	Name	Unit	Date of death	Burial/Commemoration
WO	Burney R. Whitehouse DFC	No. 7 Squadron RAF	21 Jan. 1944	Hanover War Cemetery
WO	Granville S. Sharpe DFM	No. 97 Squadron RAF	24 Sep. 1944	St. Michael's Churchyard
