= Leeder's Mill, Stratton St Michael =

Mill in Long Stratton, Norfolk, England

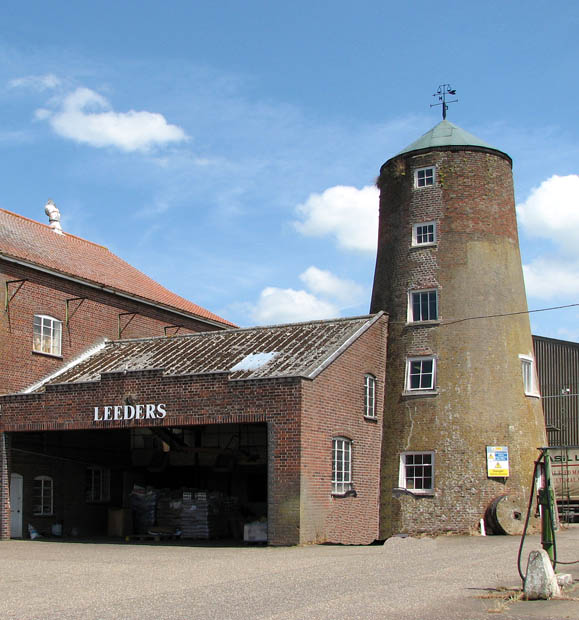
- Leeder's Mill, June 2009
- Interactive map of Leeder's Mill, Stratton St Michael

Origin
- Mill name: Leeder's Mill
- Mill location: Stratton St. Michael, Norfolk, United Kingdom
- Grid reference: TM 2071 9209
- Coordinates: 52°28′56″N 1°14′59″E
- Operators: Basil L. Leeder & Sons, Ltd.
- Year built: 1820

Information
- Purpose: Corn mill
- Type: Tower mill
- Storeys: Five storeys
- No. of sails: Four
- Type of sails: Patent sails
- Windshaft: Cast iron
- Winding: Fantail
- Fantail blades: Six
- Auxiliary power: Steam engine, later electric motor
- No. of pairs of millstones: Two pairs

Leeder's Mill is a Grade II listed tower mill in Stratton St. Michael, Norfolk, United Kingdom. The mill worked by wind until 1926. The tower survives, incorporated into a roller mill.

== History ==
Leeder's Mill was marked on Bryant's 1826 map of Norfolk. It was worked with a nearby post mill. James Aldred was the miller in 1834. The mills were offered for sale by auction in April 1834. The tower mill was described as having "three stories". William Robertson had bought the mills by 1839, working them until his death in 1858. The mils were then run by his widow until 1865, by which date the mill had been raised by two storeys. The mills were offered for sale by auction in July 1865, but did not sell and were offered to let the following month. William Goram was the miller in 1868, followed by George Potter from 1872 to 1879. The tower mill was offered to let in 1880, the post mill having ceased working c. 1875 and subsequently being dismantled. Archibald Leeder was the miller from 1883 to 1912, followed by Francis Leeder from 1916 to 1925. A steam engine had been installed as auxiliary power by 1916. Following the death of Francis Leeder, the mill was worked by his widow, Florence. It was working in 1926, but had lost the shutters from one sail 1929. The mill retained all four sails in 1937, but the fantail was down to two blades. A modern roller mill had been constructed nearby by 1938. A fire occurred at the roller mill in 1950. The roller mill was rebuilt. The tower of the windmill was incorporated into the roller mill. Arthur C. Smith surveyed the mill on 29 August 1972. He described the mill as a preserved tower with a conical roof and weathervane. The mill was listed Grade II on 21 September 1976. survives, devoid of machinery.

== Description ==
Leeder's Mill is a five storey tower mill. It had a boat shape cap with a petticoat. Four double Patent sails were carried on a cast iron windshaft. The sails had nine bays, eight had three shutters and on had two. The mill was winded by a six-blade fantail. Two pairs of millstones were driven.
