= Dunston, Norfolk =

Village in Norfolk, England

Coordinates: 52.5767°N 1.2839°E

Dunston
- Dunston Hall

- Location within Norfolk
- OS grid reference: TG 227 025
- Civil parish: Stoke Holy Cross
- District: South Norfolk
- Shire county: Norfolk
- Region: East
- Country: England
- Sovereign state: United Kingdom
- Post town: Norwich
- Postcode district: NR14
- Dialling code: 01508
- UK Parliament: South Norfolk

Dunston is a village and former civil parish, now in the parish of Stoke Holy Cross, in the South Norfolk district of the English county of Norfolk.

Dunston is located 6.9 miles (11.1 km) east of Wymondham and 3.1 miles (5.0 km) south of Norwich, in the valley of the River Tas.

== History ==
Dunston's name is of Anglo-Saxon origin and derives from the Old English for Dunn's or Dunni's settlement.

In the Domesday Book, Dunston is listed as a settlement of 35 households in the hundred of Humbleyard. In 1086, the village was divided between the estates of Alan of Brittany, Roger Bigod, Godric the Steward, Ralph de Beaufour and an unnamed freeman.

Dunston Hall was built in the Elizabethan style in 1859 by John Chessell Buckler and later by Edward Boardman in 1878. Today, the hall is a luxury hotel, spa and golf course.

== Geography ==
In 1931 the parish had a population of 63. On 1 April 1935 the civil parish was abolished and merged with Stoke Holy Cross.

Dunston Common is located within the village and is popular with walkers.

== St. Remigius' Church ==
Dunston's village church is dedicated to Saint Remigius and dates from the Thirteenth Century. St. Remigius' is located on Stoke Lane and has been Grade II listed since 1959.

St. Remigius's tower was rebuilt in the Victorian era but the church still boasts a rood screen from the Fifteenth Century and stained-glass designed by J & J King of Norwich depicting Saint Remigius, Saint Christopher and Saint Nicomedes.

== Governance ==
Dunston is part of the electoral ward of Mulbarton & Stoke Holy Cross for local elections and is part of the district of South Norfolk.

The village's national constituency is South Norfolk which has been represented by the Labour's Ben Goldsborough MP since 2024.

== War Memorial ==
Dunston's war memorial is solely for the First World War and is a wooden plaque inside St. Remigius' Church which lists the following names:

Rank	Name	Unit	Date of death	Burial
Sgt.	Robert C. Rayner	att. Chinese Labour Corps	29 Jan. 1920	Fort Massey Cemetery
Gnr.	William H. Nudds	Royal Field Artillery	28 Jul. 1917	Koksijde Cemetery
Gnr.	William T. Rayner	147th Bde., R.F.A.	1 Nov. 1918	Thiant Cemetery
Pte.	Stephen H. Hubbard	3rd Bn., Grenadier Guards	31 Jul. 1917	Menin Gate
Pte.	Alfred J. Parfitt	1st Bn., Norfolk Regiment	27 Jul. 1916	Thiepval Memorial
Pte.	Frederick H. Bloom	7th Bn., Norfolk Regt.	17 Jul. 1915	Nieppe Cemetery
Pte.	Albert F. Jermy	8th Bn., Norfolk Regt.	1 Feb. 1917	Varennes Cemetery
Pte.	Frank Parfitt	8th Bn., Norfolk Regt.	19 Jul. 1916	Thiepval Memorial
Pte.	Frederick W. Loveday	4th Bn., Worcestershire Regiment	23 Apr. 1917	Arras Memorial
