= Pye Road =

Roman road in England

Coordinates: 52.31173°N 1.10353°E

Pye Road is a Roman road running from the capital of the Iceni at Venta Icenorum (Caistor St Edmund near Norwich) to the original Roman provincial capital and legionary base at Camulodunum (Colchester). The road was later extended, connecting it to the new provincial capital north of the bridge over the Thames at Londinium (London), although that part of the route is also known by the name the Great Road.

== Route ==
The road runs from Venta Icenorum (Caistor St Edmund) to Camulodunum (Colchester), partly sharing a route with the A140 road. Between Colchester and London, the path of the former gravel road is not as certain, but it is believed to follow Ilford's High Street, Romford Road (A118), a now unpaved route through the present Olympic Park, and then the line of Whitechapel Road to Aldgate in the northeast corner of the City of London.

== See also ==
- Boudica's Way
