= A140 road =

Road in England

A140

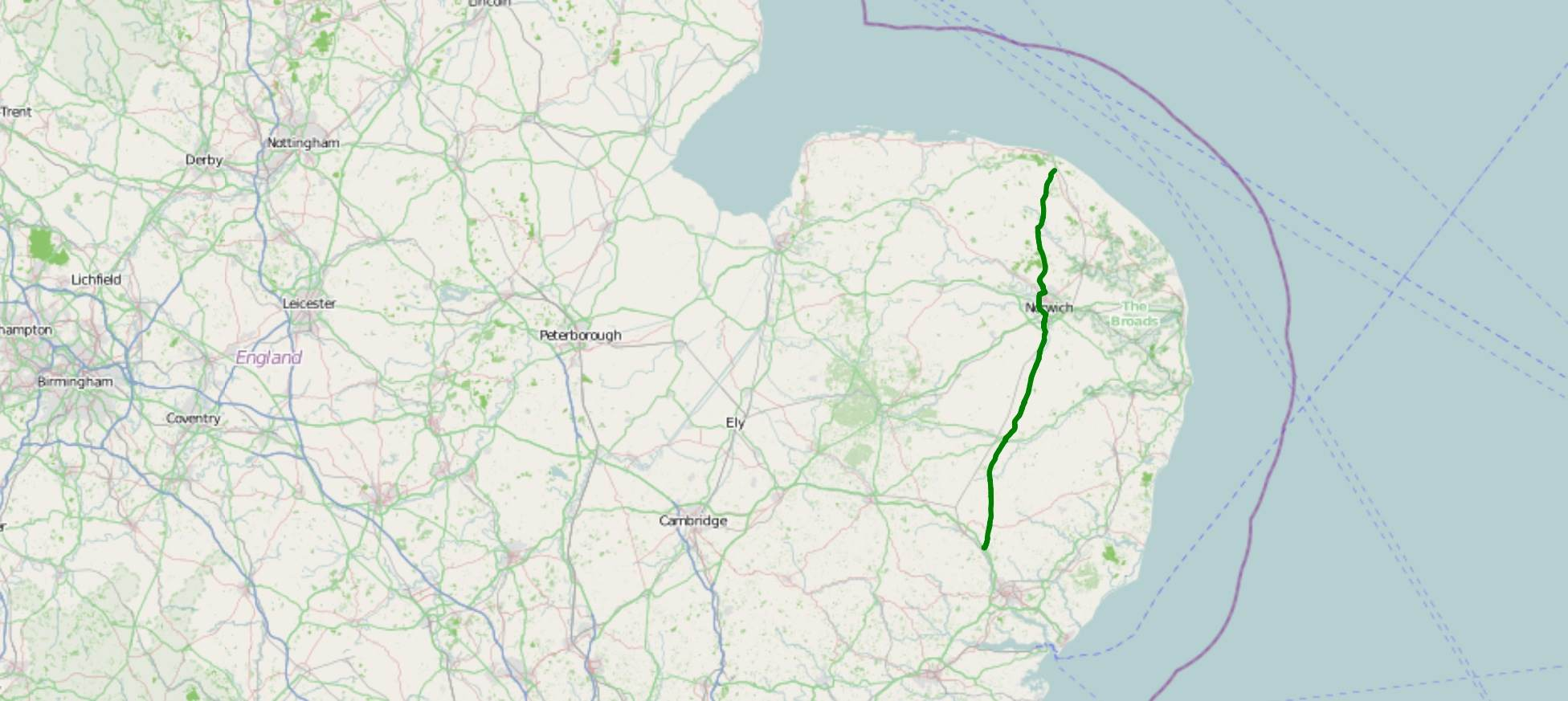
- Click map to enlarge

Route information
- Length: 56 mi (90 km)

Major junctions
- South end: Needham Market
- A11; A14 Junction 51; A47 A143 A146 A149 A1042 A1074 A1066 A1067 A1120
- North end: Cromer

Location
- Country: United Kingdom
- Primary destinations: Diss; Norwich; Aylsham; Cromer (Ipswich)

Road network
- Roads in the United Kingdom; Motorways; A and B road zones

The A140 is an 'A-class' road in Norfolk and Suffolk, East Anglia, England partly following the route of the Roman Pye Road. It runs from the A14 near Needham Market to the A149 south of Cromer. It is of primary status for the entirety of its route. It is approximately 56 miles (90 km) in length.

== Route ==
=== Ipswich to Diss ===
The road starts as dual carriageway from junction 51 with the A14 road; it then travels north to its junction with the A1120. It then continues to the Suffolk countryside providing access to the villages of Little Stonham, Mendlesham and Mendlesham Green. It passes through Brockford Street (where it crosses the River Dove), Thwaite, Stoke Ash, Thornham Parva, Yaxley and Brome where it meets its junction with the B1077. One mile (1.6 km) later it reaches a roundabout with the A143 – where it enters Norfolk and becomes dual carriageway – and a second outside Scole links it with the A1066. This section of road bypasses Scole to the east of Diss.

=== Diss to Norwich ===
The road bypasses Scole and then Thelveton after which it meets a roundabout marking the end of the dual carriageway. It continues north, bypassing Dickleburgh, to a junction with the B1134, a few miles later it bypasses Long Stratton to the east on a single-carriageway bypass opened in 2025, with roundabouts at Edges Lane and Church Lane. The former route through the town centre was downgraded to the C889 Norwich Road. The road then continues through Stratton Saint Michael, Upper Tasburgh, Saxlingham Thorpe, Newton Flotman and Swainsthorpe. Shortly after it crosses the A47 at the Harford Interchange and River Yare. South of Norwich it turns left making up the west portion of the outer ring road. In the ring road it has junctions with the A11, B1108, A1074, A1067 and other unnumbered roads.

=== Norwich to Cromer ===
North of Norwich it passes Norwich Airport and the Norwich airport park and ride before reaching the roundabout with the B1149 which is adjacent to Manor Park, home of the Norfolk County Cricket Club. It heads north close to Horsham St Faith and then Newton St Faith. The road passes through mixed woodland close to the villages of Hainford, Stratton Strawless, Hevingham and Marsham. Before reaching the roundabout on the southern outskirts of Aylsham where it turns east to join the Aylsham by-pass and then pass the B1354 before crossing the River Bure and the junction of the B1145 close to Banningham. From here it heads in a northerly direction close to the villages of Erpingham and Alby with Thwaite, passing through Roughton where it meets the B1436 and then merging with the A149 road.

== History ==
The A140 formed part of a Roman road, known later as Pye Road which ran from Camulodunum (Colchester) to Venta Icenorum (near Norwich).

The southern section from the junction with the A14 to Scole once formed part of Suffolk's first turnpike trust in which ran from Ipswich to Scole (and also from Claydon to Stowmarket and Haughley). The trust was either established in 1741 (or in 1711). A turnpike trust was established from Scole Bridge to Norwich by act of parliament much later in 1826. Most turnpikes in Suffolk were removed in the 1870s. The 1826 Act was not however officially repealed until 2008 by the Statute Law (Repeals) Act 2008.

In 1986 the government's Roads for Prosperity White Paper proposed the dualling of the entire Suffolk stretch of the A140 from its junction with the A14 (then the A45) and Scole. This proposal was never pursued.

Between 1997 and 2003 (78 months) there were 9 fatalities, 36 serious and 147 slight injuries on the road and as a result in 2004 a temporary 50 mph speed limit was introduced on the Suffolk section and permanent 30 mph through the villages of Earl Stonham and Brockford and 40 mph through Brome. The 30 mph zones had 40 mph 'buffers' either side. Between 2006 and 2008 Suffolk County Council removed a number of 40 mph buffers to "improve compliance and understanding" and extended some 30 mph zones slightly at the same time.

In February 2016, Nicholas Churchill, a disgruntled middle aged construction worker stole his employer's mining truck and drove for about 50 km on this highway and other roads. During this time, he drove into various structures and police vehicles. He finally stopped the truck in Brandon where he was arrested.

=== Long Stratton bypass ===
A bypass for the village of Long Stratton was a long-standing proposal for the A140. In 2002 Norfolk County Council held a public consultation, which resulted in a preferred route to the east of the village being selected in 2003. A planning application was submitted in 2004 and approved in February 2005, but changes in the way road schemes were funded meant that no central government funding was approved at the time.

The scheme was revived as part of plans for around 1,800 new homes in Long Stratton. The Department for Transport approved the outline business case in July 2021, and South Norfolk District Council granted planning permission for the bypass, together with the housing, in 2023. Octavius Infrastructure was appointed as the main contractor in January 2024, and construction began on 28 May 2024 after the government approved the full business case.

The 3.9-kilometre (2.4 mi) single-carriageway bypass runs to the east of the village, from a roundabout at Church Lane to rejoin the existing A140 near Oakside Farm. It opened to traffic on 11 August 2025, and was officially opened at the end of October 2025. The scheme cost about £47 million and was funded mainly by the Department for Transport's Major Road Network fund, with contributions from the Greater Norwich Growth Board, developer contributions and the Community Infrastructure Levy. The old road through the town became the C889 Norwich Road.
