= Trowse =

Village in Norfolk, England

Coordinates: 52.612°N 1.320°E

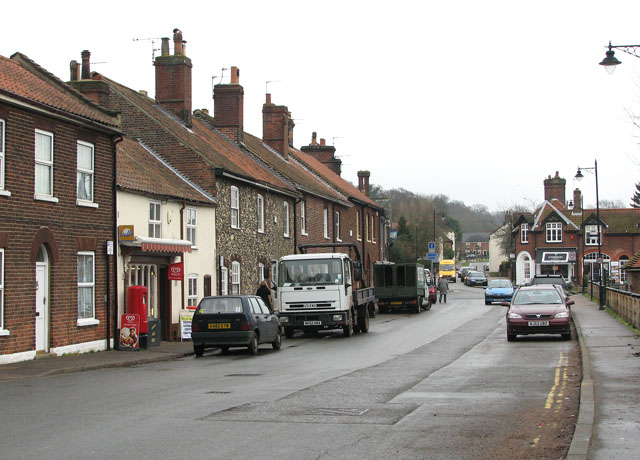

- Location within Norfolk
- Area: 4.49 km^{2} (1.73 sq mi)
- Population: 862
  - Density: 192/km^{2} (500/sq mi)
- OS grid reference: TG245068
- Civil parish: Trowse with Newton
- District: South Norfolk
- Shire county: Norfolk
- Region: East
- Country: England
- Sovereign state: United Kingdom
- Post town: NORWICH
- Postcode district: NR14
- Dialling code: 01603
- Police: Norfolk
- Fire: Norfolk
- Ambulance: East of England
- UK Parliament: South Norfolk

Trowse (pronounced /ˈtraʊs/ by those from Norwich and /ˈtruːs/ by elderly residents of the village), also called Trowse with Newton, is a village in Norfolk, England. It lies about 2 miles (3.2 km) south-east of Norwich city centre, on the banks of the River Yare. It covers an area of 4.49 km^{2} (1.73 sq mi) and had a population of 479 in 233 households at the 2001 census; it increased to 862 in 374 households at the 2011 census. There are approved plans to build a further 770 houses on the outskirts of the village, at White Horse Lane and the Deal Ground sites.

== Toponymy ==
The name Trowse derives from the old English/Scottish word "trouse", for "a grating of wood or iron", which could be raised or lowered (like a gate) to allow water out of a dam into a mill race. The original village grew up round the local water mill, now Trowse Millgate.

== History ==
Trowse is one of a small family of model villages in Great Britain.

Trowse was expanded by the Colman family during the 1800s for workers at Colman's mustard factory; the family still owns much of the surrounding land. It was also home to May Gurney, a major civil engineering and construction company which was acquired by the Kier Group in 2013.

The parish is in the deanery of Brooke and the archdeaconry of Norfolk.

The parish church, dedicated to St Andrew, is a small flint building in the Perpendicular style, comprising a chancel, nave and square tower with a bell; the chancel was restored in 1879.

The parish formed part of the Henstead Hundred, until 1834 when the Hundred expanded to become the Henstead Union. Source: Kelly's Directory 1883 and 1927.

The Trowse village sign, located opposite the church, was presented to the parish in 1969 by the Women's Institute to celebrate their Golden Jubilee; it saw renovation projects in 1999 and 2023.

Trouse (or Trews north of the border) was also the slang name for the leggings worn by Scots (since they too went up and down like a gate to allow water out) – and hence the word Trouser. Source: Kelly's Directory 1883, Oxford companion to place names, English Gazetteer and others.

== Geography ==
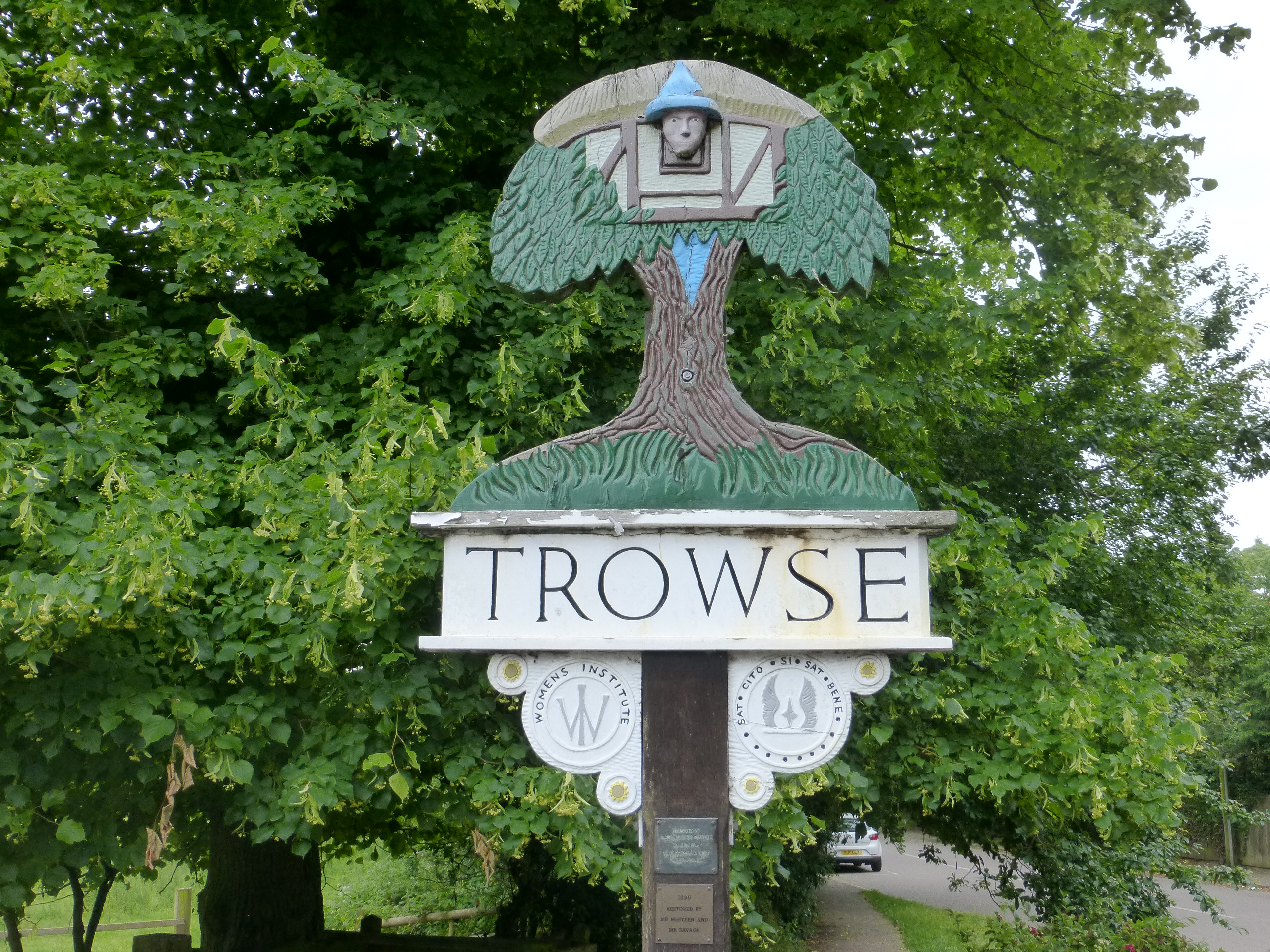
Trowse village sign

The village of Trowse forms the main part of the parish of Trowse with Newton. It consists of six parts:

- Trowse Common: the main village, clustered around the Common;
- Crown Point: the high ground round the historic Crown Point pub, site of the original Newton and where a new Hopkins Homes estate was built in 2003;
- Trowse Millgate: around the River Yare, half of which is in the City of Norwich;
- Trowse Magna: the name given to the gated development at Whitlingham Hall (a former hospital);
- New Newton: an extension to the village, centred on Newton Close, built in 1968 to accommodate police from the newly built County Hall;
- Nether Trowse: the area at the far end of Whitlingham Lane, which was once recognised as the hamlet of Whitlingham (until the church burned down and the tower collapsed).

The original Newton, of Trowse with Newton, was the row of cottages on Block Hill behind the Crown Point pub, which was the model village (or new town) built by the Colman family for workers in its mustard factory at Trowse Millgate. Some of the properties still have mustard yellow front doors.

The Crown Point pub takes its name from the estate, of which it was originally part, which centred on Crown Point Hall (now called Whitlingham Hall). It was built originally by General Money who fought at the battle of Crown Point during the American War of Independence.

The River Tas joins the River Yare a short distance to the west of the Trowse Mill at an artificially created confluence; however, the old bed of the River Tas can still be seen by the church but it just ebbs and flows with the tide and is gradually silting up. The mill was demolished in 1967; what can be seen today was built recently in a style and layout remarkably sympathetic to the old mill.

== The village today ==
Since the building of the Norwich southern bypass and associated Trowse bypass in 1992, the village, which was once divided by the A146, has now regained its rural character.

Trowse is still growing, with a recent development of sixty houses at the top of the village on the site of the former training ground of Norwich City Football Club; there are proposals to develop the village further, although potential developments are largely opposed by locals as they are concerned that over development will spoil the character of the village.

The village is also opposed to being part of the proposed expanded Norwich, with 99% of those who voted in a referendum in 2008 against being part of a Greater Norwich.

== Amenities ==
The village is well endowed with leisure facilities with a sports hall, astroturf football pitch, dry ski slope, two broads in adjacent Whitlingham (one a conservation lake, the other for water based leisure activities), woodland walks, riverside picnic areas along Whitlingham Lane and a common right in the centre.

There are two pubs: the White Horse Inn and the Crown Point Tavern; with a village shop and a vegetarian café.

== Transport ==
Now bypassed by the A146, most road links are now through Norwich itself. Trowse is reached by a spur from the Martineau Lane roundabout on the Norwich Ring Road.

Although lying on the Great Eastern Main Line between Norwich and London Liverpool Street, Trowse railway station was closed on the outbreak of World War II. It was used briefly during 1986 when Norwich station was closed in preparation for electrification. The nearest National Rail station is at Norwich, with direct trains to locations throughout East Anglia and to London, operated by Greater Anglia.

Trowse lies on three bus routes, with services operated by First Eastern Counties and Konectbus:

- 40A: between Norwich city centre and Poringland
- 41A: between Norwich city centre, Stoke Holy Cross and Bungay
- 84: between Norwich bus station, Hempnall and Harleston.

National Cycle Route 1 passes through Trowse on its way out of Norwich to Loddon and Beccles, passing along Whitlingham Lane. A cycle route is also provided across the Norwich southern bypass to link with Poringland and Kirby Bedon.
