= Tharston and Hapton =

Civil parish in Norfolk, England

Coordinates: 52.5134°N 1.218452°E

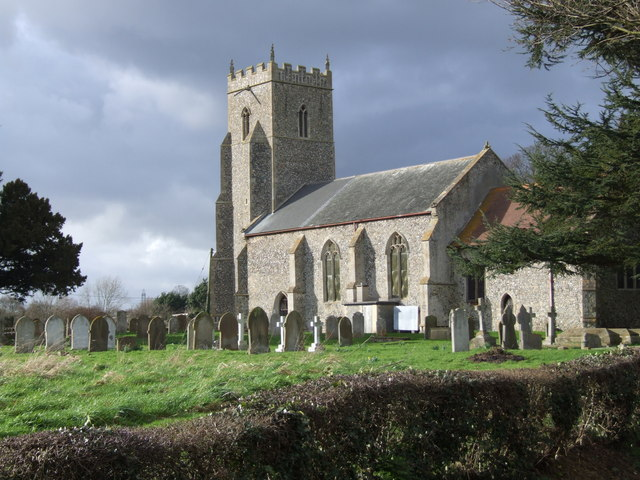
- Tharston

- Location within Norfolk
- Area: 9.26 km^{2} (3.58 sq mi)
- Population: 793 (2011)
  - Density: 86/km^{2} (220/sq mi)
- OS grid reference: TM184954
- Civil parish: Tharston and Hapton
- District: South Norfolk
- Shire county: Norfolk
- Region: East
- Country: England
- Sovereign state: United Kingdom
- Post town: NORWICH
- Postcode district: NR15
- Dialling code: 01508
- Police: Norfolk
- Fire: Norfolk
- Ambulance: East of England

Tharston and Hapton is a civil parish in the South Norfolk district, in the county of Norfolk, England. It encompasses the two villages of Tharston and Hapton, covering 9.26 km^{2} (3.58 sq mi). The parish had a population of 599 in 231 households at the 2001 census, increasing to 793 at the 2011 census.

== Notable population changes ==
A more than 20% increase in local population within 10 years reflects new housing on uninhabited land by Tharston's southern limit (by Long Stratton) (approximately 2001 to 2005).

Its other notable population changes in Tharston were a shift from for decades of early censuses from a range of 352 to 392 to a range about 35% lower for the early 20th century, followed by a bounce back beyond original levels to 428 in 1951 by which time further housing had been built.

== Extent of Tharston and of Hapton ==
The scope of Tharston unusually changed, from 1,430 acres (5.8 km^{2}) in 1831, in two changes to 1,633 acres (6.61 km^{2}) in 1891. Hapton changed from 670 to 700 acres (2.8 km^{2}) in a similar period. These figures are borne out in the size of today's ecclesiastical parishes in the Church of England.

== Elevation and drainage ==
The River Tas including tributaries all rise in the same district, and flows to the north, discharging into the east flowing rivers of the county's city: Norwich. Its source is at 51 metres (167 ft) above sea level and the district is relatively flat in line with all but the west of the county, Norwich varying more considerably but lying in places at 30 metres (98 ft) above sea level.

== Facilities ==
=== Churches of England ===
- Saint Margaret's, Hapton
- Saint Mary's, Tharston.

== School ==
A Church of England supported and ethos primary school is in the village of Hapton.

== Local economy and leisure ==
Redwings Horse Sanctuary purchased Hapton Hall several years ago and much associated land.

A small industrial estate/distribution estate is in Tharston land, more immediately adjacent to Long Stratton.

== Railways ==
During the Victorian era, a small loop line was constructed from nearby Forncett village to the town of Wymondham. The line, some remains visible, crossed the Tas at Tharston so a short viaduct was built.

== Culture events ==
=== Julia Thomas Memorial Concert ===
In July 2008, a Jubilee Events Committee organised a "Proms in the Park" for Tharston. All profits made went to the Priscilla Bacon Lodge at Colman Hospital in Norwich. Newton Flotman ARTS Choir, South Norfolk Youth Symphonic Orchestra conducted by Mike Booty and many other soloists performed. A Mustang and Spitfire flew over; a flight in the mustang was a prize auctioned.

The concert was broadcast live on British Atlantic Radio, an internet station (now defunct) by certain villagers.
