= Shotesham =

Village in Norfolk, England

Coordinates: 52.543686°N 1.321621°E

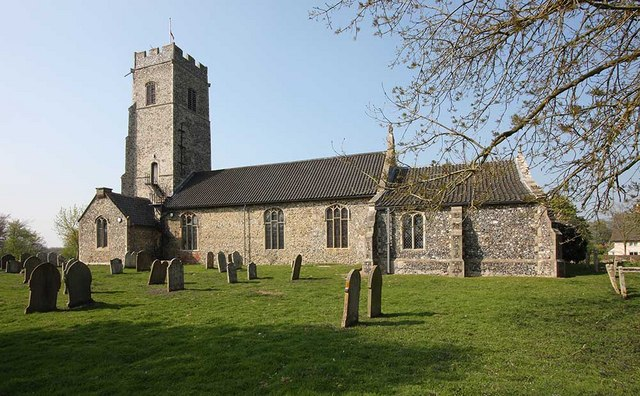
- All Saints’ Church, Shotesham

- Location within Norfolk
- Area: 14.50 km^{2} (5.60 sq mi)
- Population: 562
  - Density: 39/km^{2} (100/sq mi)
- OS grid reference: TM253991
- Civil parish: Shotesham
- District: South Norfolk
- Shire county: Norfolk
- Region: East
- Country: England
- Sovereign state: United Kingdom
- Post town: NORWICH
- Postcode district: NR15
- Dialling code: 01508
- Police: Norfolk
- Fire: Norfolk
- Ambulance: East of England

Shotesham (/ˈʃɒt.səm/) is a village in South Norfolk which lies approximately 5 miles south of Norwich. It sits next to Stoke Holy Cross and Saxlingham Nethergate in the valley of the River Tas. It covers an area of 14.50 km^{2} (5.60 sq mi) and had a population of 539 in 210 households at the 2001 census, increasing to 562 in 227 households at the 2011 census.

In local dialect, Shotesham is pronounced "Shottsum"; the emphasis is placed upon the vowel of the first syllable; "Shottsum"; "Shottsham"

== D'Oyly family ==
Shotesham was for many years the Norfolk seat of the D'Oyly family and of the D'Oyly baronets 'of Shottisham', Norfolk (not to be confused with Shottisham, Suffolk), who also possessed estates in Suffolk. The country house and estate of Shotesham Park, designed by Sir John Soane, is the seat of the Fellowes family.

== Churches ==
Four churches were once to be found here: two are intact and two are ruins:

=== All Saints’ ===
The present parish church stands in the centre of the village, and is from two distinct periods. It has a medieval tower and nave, with a chancel from the early 20th century.

=== St Mary's ===
On the other side of the valley from All Saints, about a mile away, is this church, which had a Victorian restoration, next to a large farmhouse, and the ruin of St Martins. There is a monthly service.

=== St Martin's ===
Standing in the shadow of St Mary's, the church has been a ruin for centuries. The narrow nave and chancel survive mostly to head height, with a well-preserved east gable. There are also remains of the south porch.

=== St Botolph's ===
The area has been cleared and replanted and the ruin consolidated for public viewing.
