= Samuel William King =

English clergyman and geologist

- Died: July 8, 1868
- Occupation(s): Clergyman, Geologist

Samuel William King FRGS FGS FSA (20 September 1821 – 8 July 1868) was an English clergyman and geologist.

== Life ==
King was the eldest son of W. H. King, vicar of Nuneaton in Warwickshire. He graduated B.A. in 1845, and proceeded to M.A. in 1853 from St Catharine's College, Cambridge. He was ordained priest in Manchester in 1848, and became rector of Saxlingham Nethergate, Norfolk, in 1851. He married in 1849 Emma, daughter of John Fort.

King was an enthusiastic entomologist and geologist, and helped Sir Charles Lyell, who was a personal friend, in his investigations in England and abroad. Letters from King to Lyell exist in the Sir Charles Lyell Collection held by Heritage Collections, University of Edinburgh. In 1860 the two explored the deposits at Hoxne, Suffolk, together, and in 1865 King investigated the Cave of Aurignac.

King travelled frequently on the continent, and was an enthusiastic mountain climber. His wife usually accompanied him, and the records of a long expedition made about 1855 are contained in King's only book, The Italian Valleys of the Pennine Alps (1858). It is illustrated from drawings made by the author. King was a fellow of the Royal Geographical Society (1858), the Geological Society (1860), and of the Society of Antiquaries.

He died at Pontresina in Switzerland in 1868, and was buried there. His collection of fossil mammalia from the Norfolk forest beds he bequeathed to the Museum of Practical Geology (now the Geological Museum).

== See also ==
- Hoxnian Stage
