= Venta Icenorum =

Roman-era capital of the Iceni tribe in Norfolk, England

Coordinates: 52.5835°N 1.2909°E

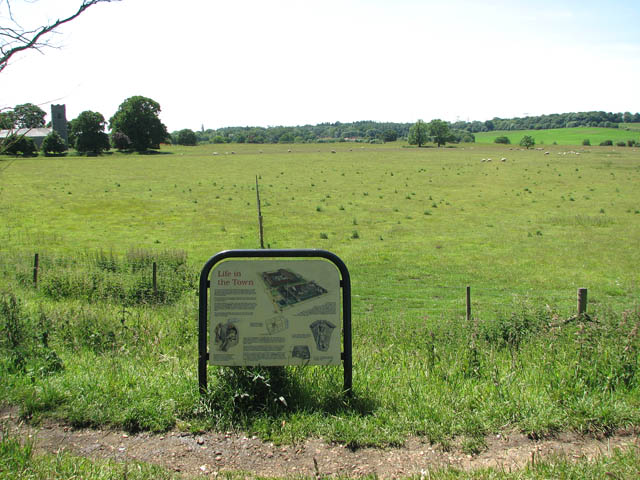
The site today

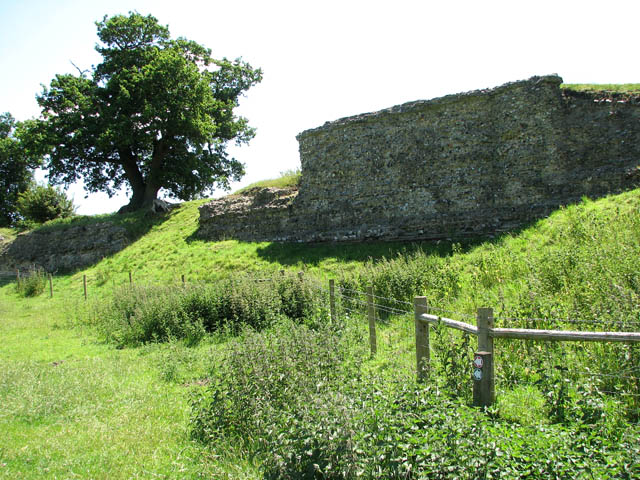
North Wall

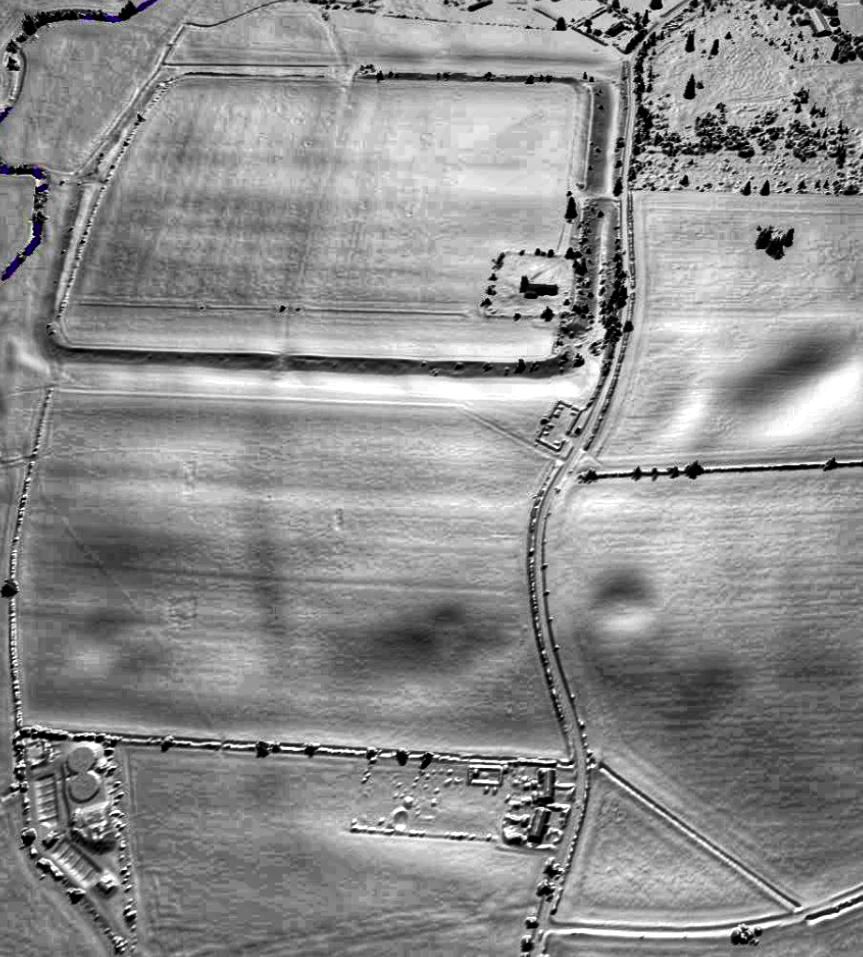
A lidar view of Venta Icenorum

Venta Icenorum (Classical Latin: [ˈwɛnta ɪkeːˈnoːrũː], literally "marketplace of the Iceni") was the civitas or capital of the Iceni tribe, located at modern-day Caistor St Edmund in the English county of Norfolk. The Iceni inhabited the flatlands and marshes of that county and are famous for having revolted against Roman rule under their queen Boudica in the winter of 61 CE.

== Roman town ==
The town itself was probably laid out, and its first streets metalled, in approximately the first half of the second century. The town, which is mentioned in both the Ravenna Cosmography and the Antonine Itinerary, was a settlement near the village of Caistor St. Edmund, some 5 miles (8.0 km) south of present-day Norwich, and a mile or two from the Bronze Age henge at Arminghall. The site lies on the River Tas.

== Archaeology ==
In 1928, an aerial reconnaissance flight of a farm near Caistor St Edmund rediscovered the ruins of Venta Icenorum. A five-year archaeological dig soon followed, led by archaeologist Donald Atkinson.

The site subsequently remained uninvestigated until the University of Nottingham reopened it in 2009 seeking Iron Age (Iceni) structures beneath the town. The evidence uncovered revealed that the site was not established on a previous Iron Age town, but was a newly built and sparsely populated frontier town focused on administration and trade. It also revealed a partial integration of the mainly agrarian locals into Roman norms.

The embankments of Venta Icenorum can still be seen at Caistor today. The ruins (grid reference TG230034) are in the care of The Norfolk Archaeological Trust and managed by South Norfolk District Council. In 2011, the Trust expanded the site by buying an additional 55 acres of land across the river opposite the West Gate.

== See also ==
- Pye Road
- Boudica's Way

== Bibliography ==
- Peterson, John W. M. (2003). "Iron Age and Roman square enclosures near Venta Icenorum : Roman changes in a prehistoric ritual landscape". Collection de l'Institut des Sciences et Techniques de l'Antiquité. 890 (1). Besançon (France): 161–184.
