= Hapton, Norfolk =

Village in Norfolk, England

Coordinates: 52.52192°N 1.20896°E

Hapton
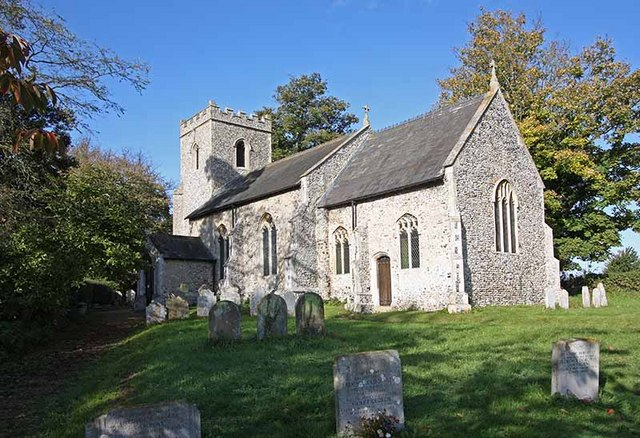
- St Margaret, Hapton

- Location within Norfolk
- OS grid reference: TM178964
- Civil parish: Tharston and Hapton
- District: South Norfolk
- Shire county: Norfolk
- Region: East
- Country: England
- Sovereign state: United Kingdom
- Post town: Norwich
- Postcode district: NR15
- Dialling code: 01508
- Police: Norfolk
- Fire: Norfolk
- Ambulance: East of England
- UK Parliament: South Norfolk

Hapton is a village and former civil parish, now in the parish of Tharston and Hapton, in the South Norfolk district, in the English county of Norfolk.

Hapton is located 4.9 miles (7.9 km) south-east of Wymondham and 7.8 miles (12.6 km) south-west of Norwich.

== History ==
Hapton's name is of Anglo-Saxon origin and derives from the Old English for Heabba's settlement.

In the Domesday Book, Hapton is listed as a settlement of 33 households in the hundred of Depwade. In 1086, the village was divided between the estates of Roger Bigod and Hugh d'Avranches, Earl of Chester.

Hapton Hall was built in the Nineteenth Century. During the Second World War, a pillbox was built near the hall to defend against a possible German invasion. The headquarters of Redwings Horse Sanctuary is now at the site.

On 1 April 1935, the parish was abolished and merged with Tharston.

== Geography ==
In 1931, the parish had a population of 159 this was the last time population statistics were collected for Hapton as in 1935 the parish was merged.

== St. Margaret's Church ==
Hapton's church is dedicated to Saint Margaret the Virgin and dates from the Fourteenth Century. St. Margaret's is located within the village on Holly Lane and has been Grade I listed since 1959. The church no longer holds Sunday services and is part of the Upper Tas Valley Benefice.

The church was restored in the Victorian era.

== Amenities ==
Hapton Church of England Primary School is part of The Saints Federation. The headmistress is Mrs. E. Sexton.

== Governance ==
Hapton is part of the electoral ward of Forncett for local elections and is part of the district of South Norfolk.

The village's national constituency is South Norfolk which has been represented by the Labour's Ben Goldsborough MP since 2024.

== War Memorial ==
Hapton's war memorial is located inside St. Margaret's Church and lists the following names for the First World War:

Rank	Name	Unit	Date of death	Burial/Commemoration
Sgt.	Frederick J. L. Green	7th Bn., Royal Warwickshire Regiment	28 Aug. 1917	Tyne Cot
Pte.	James W. Scrancher	4th (Central Ontario) Bn., CEF	19 Aug. 1917	Vimy Memorial
Pte.	George H. Groom	32nd Bn., Machine Gun Corps	7 Jun. 1918	Cabaret Rouge Cemetery
Pte.	William Pye	2nd Bn., Norfolk Regiment	3 Oct. 1916	Struma Cemetery

The following names were added after the Second World War:

Rank	Name	Unit	Date of death	Burial/Commemoration
St1C	Vernon J. Rees	HMS Hood	24 May 1941	Portsmouth Memorial
Pte.	Derek Cook	4th Bn., Royal Norfolk Regiment	21 Sep. 1944	Kranji War Memorial
Pte.	Richard E. Hurry	2nd Bn., Sherwood Foresters	25 Feb. 1944	Naples War Cemetery
Pte.	Dennis A. Woods	3rd (Melton Constable) Bn., Home Guard	22 Jun. 1941	St. Margaret's Churchyard
