= Caistor St Edmund =

Village in Norfolk, England

Coordinates: 52.587°N 1.299°E

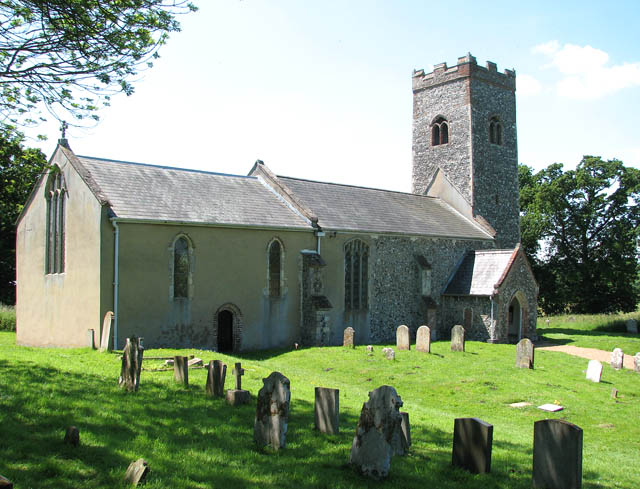
- St. Edmund's Church

- Location within Norfolk
- Area: 6.55 km^{2} (2.53 sq mi)
- Population: 289 (2011)
  - Density: 44/km^{2} (110/sq mi)
- OS grid reference: TG235039
- Civil parish: Caistor St Edmund and Bixley
- District: South Norfolk
- Shire county: Norfolk
- Region: East
- Country: England
- Sovereign state: United Kingdom
- Post town: NORWICH
- Postcode district: NR14
- Dialling code: 01508
- Police: Norfolk
- Fire: Norfolk
- Ambulance: East of England
- UK Parliament: South Norfolk

Caistor St Edmund is a settlement in the civil parish of Caistor St Edmund and Bixley, in the South Norfolk district, in the English county of Norfolk. It is 2 1/2 miles (4.0 km) south of Norwich on the River Tas. At the 2011 census (the last before the abolition of the civil parish), Caistor St Edmund had a population of 289.

== History ==
The remnants of the capital of the Iceni tribe, Venta Icenorum, are in this old parish and are now in the care of the Norfolk Archaeological Trust. It is presumed that the Stone Street Roman road runs from Dunwich in Suffolk to Caistor St Edmund.

In the Domesday Book of 1086 the village is recorded as a settlement of 26 households in the hundred of Henstead. It was held by between Ralph de Beaufour and Bury St Edmunds Abbey.

Caistor Old Hall was built in 1612 for Thomas Pettus, 1st Baronet and remained in the Pettus family until the Nineteenth Century when it passed to the Spurrells of Thurgarton.

During the Second World War, two of the original Chain Home Radar pylons were erected in Caistor. As of 2013, one of the radar pylons is still standing.

On 1 April 2019, the parish was merged with Bixley to form "Caistor St Edmund and Bixley".

== St. Edmund's Church ==
Caistor St. Edmund's parish church is dedicated to Saint Edmund the Martyr and dates to the 14th century. The church has had many additions and repairs made to it over the years, with stone from the Roman town used in the building. It has a large, carved font.
