= Long Stratton High School =

Location
- Manor Road; Long Stratton; Norwich, Norfolk, NR15 2XR; England; 52°29′23″N 1°13′46″E

Information
- Type: Academy sponsor led
- Motto: Achievement for all
- Established: 1949
- Local authority: Norfolk
- Trust: Enrich Learning Trust
- Department for Education URN: 144018 Tables
- Ofsted: Reports
- Chair of Governors: Leda Carol Ann Tarabay
- Headteacher: Alexander Lewis
- Staff: 80+
- Gender: Coeducational
- Age: 11 to 16
- Enrolment: 650 pupils
- Colour
- Website: http://www.lshs.org.uk

Long Stratton High School is a secondary school located in the town of Long Stratton in the English county of Norfolk. It educates children from ages 11 to 16 and has around 650 pupils at any one time.

== Description ==
The school was last inspected in 2021, and the inspectors found a smaller than-average secondary school which meets the expectations for attainment and progress. The students were almost exclusively white British: the proportion of students from minority ethnic groups is low. The proportion supported at school action is above average but the proportion of disabled students is below average, as is the number with statements of special educational need. Students behave well. Exclusions are very low.

== Curriculum ==
Virtually all maintained schools and academies follow the National Curriculum, and are inspected by Ofsted on how well they succeed in delivering a 'broad and balanced curriculum'.

The school teaches Key Stage 3 over three years.

=== Key Stage 3 ===
Years 7-9 "enjoy a wide breadth of subjects. They develop as artists, designers and performers, as linguists, geographers and historians, as scientists and as sports players."

Key Stage 3
Core
Maths		English	
Science			
Other
Art	Beliefs and Values	Design and Technology	French
Geography	History	ICT& Computing	Music
Spanish	PE	RE	

=== Key Stage 4 ===
In Key Stage 4, years 10 and 11, students principally study a range of GCSE courses so they achieve the English Baccalaureate. In order to do this, they study the core subjects of English, Maths, Science, they then have a guided choice, choosing two options from two option lists. They have the opportunity to include a Modern Foreign Language, Computer Science and/or a humanity History or Geography. Top set Science in year 9 are guided to choose triple science at GCSE.

== Results ==
In September 2021 OFSTED rated the school as "good". Long Stratton High School students have been receiving good grades for several years, in 2024, 74% of pupils achieved 9-4 (‘standard pass’) in both English and maths and 56% of pupils achieved 9-5 (‘strong pass’) in both English and Maths.

== Personnel matters ==
In September 2011 the then Headteacher, Dr. Paul Adams, was suspended for "gross misconduct over management issues". He was finally dismissed in September 2012 after losing his appeal over his suspension.
