= Long Stratton =

Town in Norfolk, England

Coordinates: 52.488°N 1.234°E

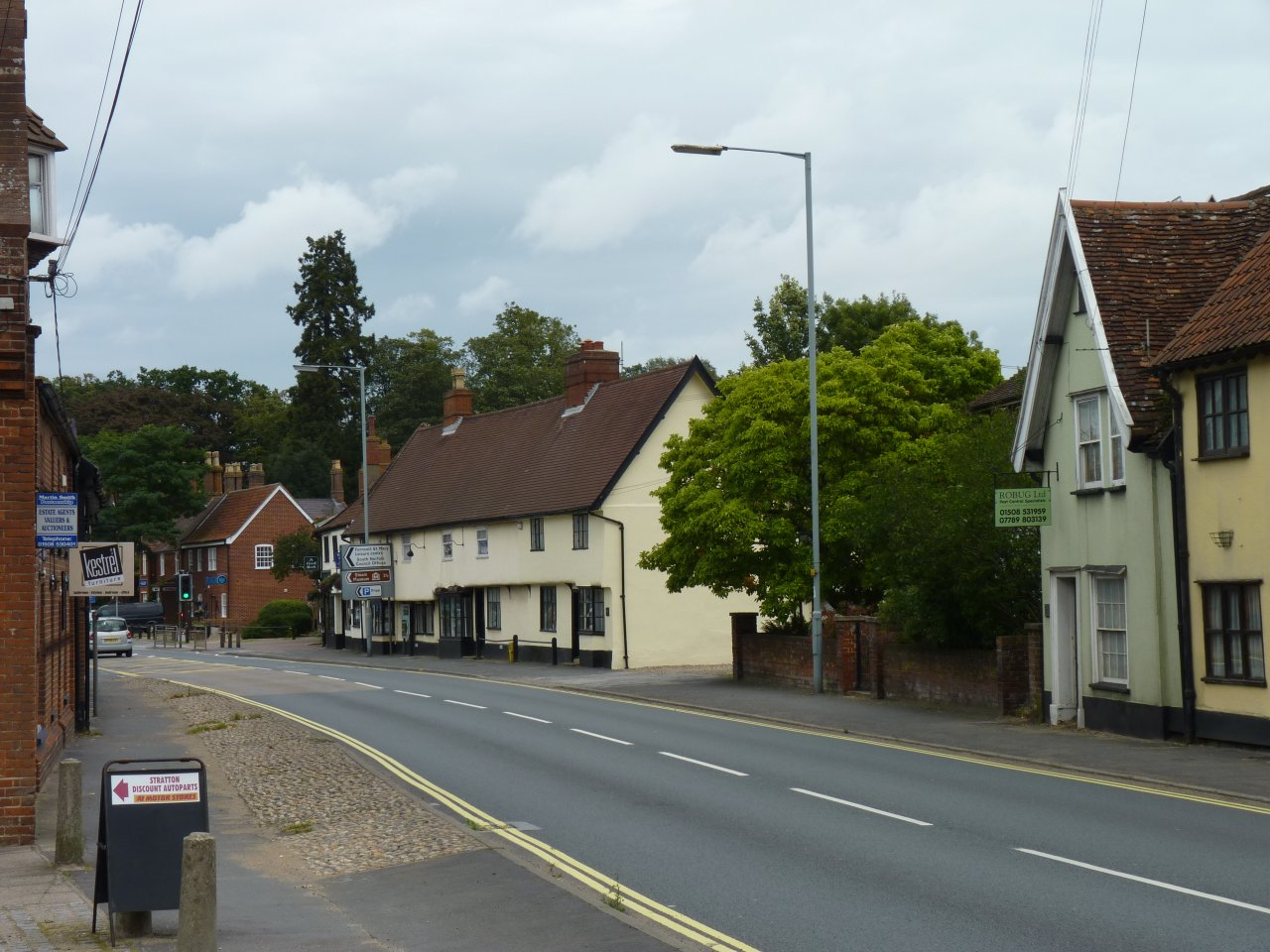
- The A140, which runs through the town

- Location within Norfolk
- Area: 10.49 km^{2} (4.05 sq mi)
- Population: 4,424 (2011 Census)
  - Density: 422/km^{2} (1,090/sq mi)
- OS grid reference: TM1954292745
- District: South Norfolk
- Shire county: Norfolk
- Region: East
- Country: England
- Sovereign state: United Kingdom
- Post town: NORWICH
- Postcode district: NR15
- Dialling code: 01508
- Police: Norfolk
- Fire: Norfolk
- Ambulance: East of England
- UK Parliament: South Norfolk

Long Stratton is a town and civil parish in Norfolk, England. It historically consisted of two villages; the larger, Stratton St. Mary, is to the south, and the other, Stratton St. Michael, lies to the north. It had a population of 4,424 in the 2011 Census.

== History ==
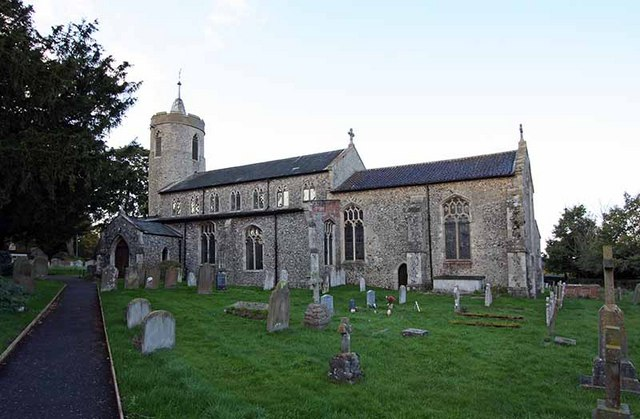
St Mary's Church

The name 'Stratton' means 'farm/settlement on a Roman road'.

Stratton St Mary & St Michael is recorded in the Domesday Book with 127 households belonging to nine different landowners. One of the ancient parishes that make up the modern town of Long Stratton was served by St Michael's church, whose rector from 1779 to 1823, Francis Wickham Swanton, was an Oxford contemporary of the celebrated Parson James Woodforde. The Blennerhasett family, later prominent in the Plantation of Ulster, were Lords of the Manor in the 16th century.

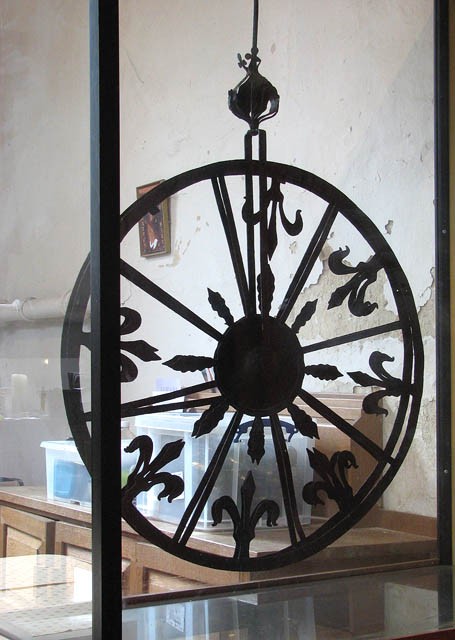
The Sexton's Wheel in St Mary's Church

The church contains a rare example of a Sexton's wheel. The only other example in the country is claimed to be at Yaxley, Suffolk.

Long Stratton has two Church of England churches (St Mary and St Michael), as well as a Methodist church. The church of Long Stratton St Mary is one of 124 existing round-tower churches in Norfolk.

The town was struck by an F1/T2 tornado on 23 November 1981, as part of the record-breaking nationwide tornado outbreak on that day.

Between 13:30 and 13:40 GMT on 14 December 1989, a tornado caused damage along a track of at least 3.1 miles (5 km) in length by 100 metres (110 yd) in width through the south Norfolk villages of North Moulton, Wacton and Long Stratton. As many as 100 buildings were damaged in Long Stratton by this T4 intensity tornado, but only one person was injured. The tornado formed from a fast-moving storm cell which developed behind a slowly-moving occluded front around the time that a secondary low was progressing along the front. It developed at the forward edge of the storm, suggesting it was triggered either by shearing instability along the leading edge of the thunderstorm outflow (gust front) or as a consequence of interaction of gust fronts from adjacent storm cells.

== Geography ==
The town is situated halfway between Norwich and Diss.

It borders five other parishes: Tharston and Hapton, Tasburgh, Morningthorpe and Fritton, Pulham Market, and Wacton.

== Demographics ==
According to the 2001 United Kingdom Census, Long Stratton CP was home to 3,701 people, who resided in a total of 1,598 dwellings. The statistics further confirm that Long Stratton is used as a commuter town, with the average employed person travelling 17 miles (27 km) to their place of work. The population increased to 4,424 by 2011.

== Governance ==
Long Stratton is part of the electoral ward of Stratton. This ward had a population of 5,519 at the 2011 census.

There is a parish council and it was granted town status in 2018. with the first elections to the new 13-member town council on 2 May 2019. The Area Action Plan, a planning document, envisages a town centre to develop together with the planned increase in residents and the completion of a by-pass.

== Amenities ==
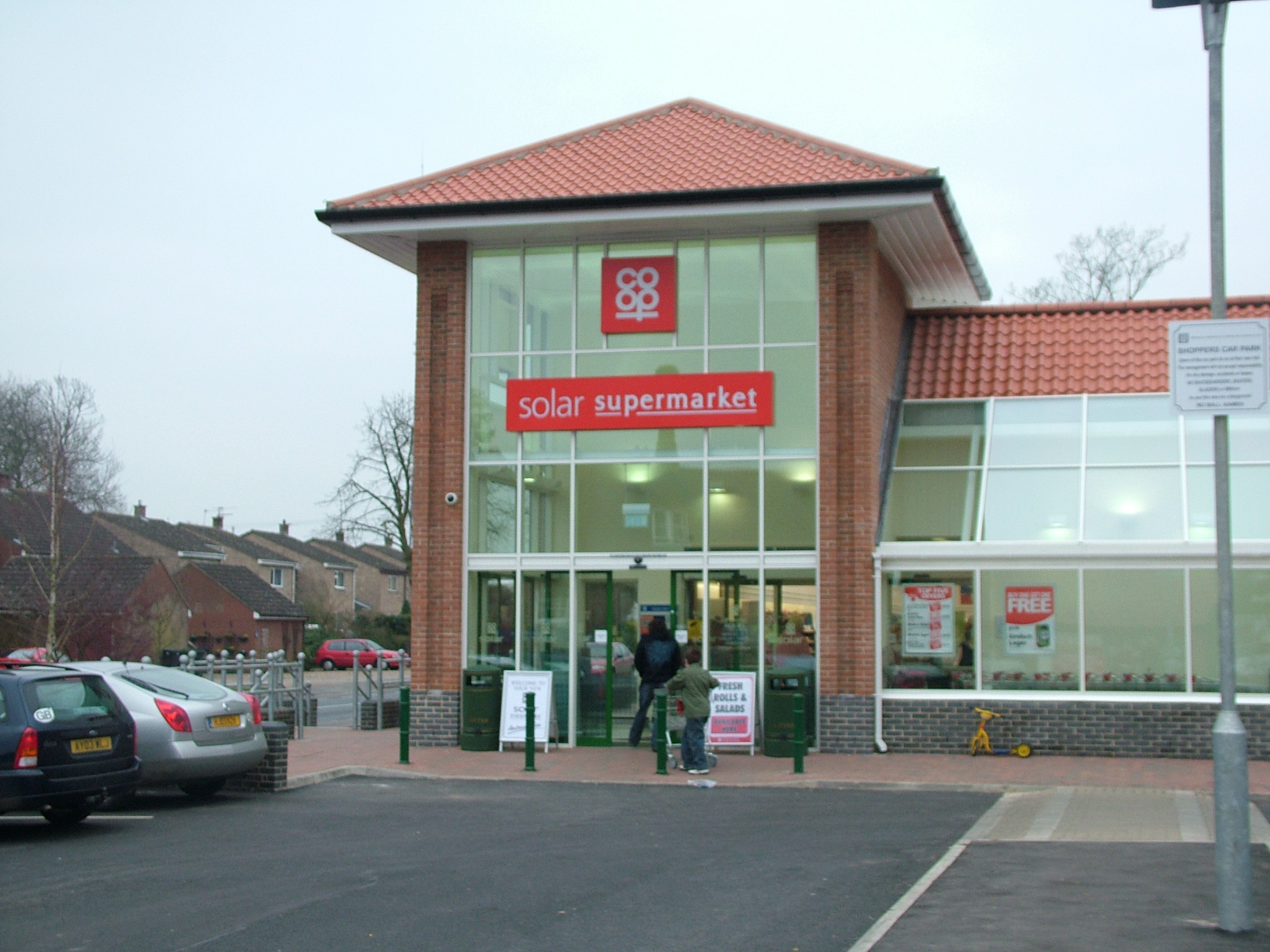
The Co-op supermarket on The Street

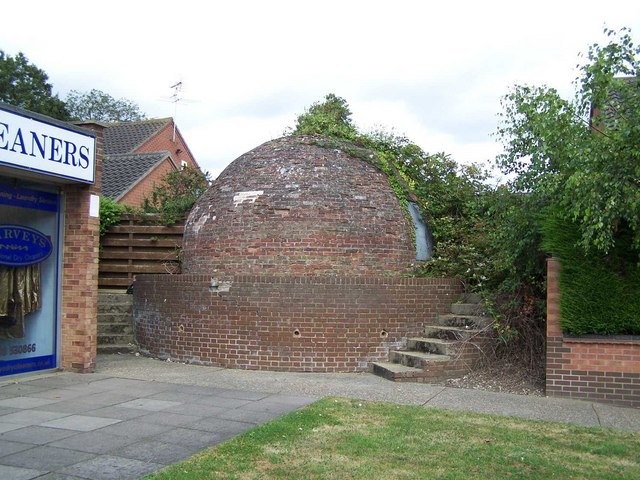
The Ice House

The town has three schools: Long Stratton High School, Manor Field Infant school and St. Mary's Church of England junior school.

Shopping facilities are located along the main street, which runs through the town as well as in two small shopping centres: South Norfolk Shopping Precinct and The Icehouse Precinct. There are also two public houses (The Queen's Head and The Swan). Long Stratton also has a doctors surgery, as well as a leisure centre operated by South Norfolk Council.

== Transport ==
=== Roads ===
The town lies along a Roman road, now known as the A140; it was originally known as Pye Road, which runs from Cromer, in North Norfolk, to Ipswich, in Suffolk.

There has been cause for the building of a bypass around Long Stratton for over 60 years. Builders of the new Churchfields housing estate to the east of the town proposed to build a bypass as part of the submission for planning permission in the mid-1990s, though this was rejected by the Highways Agency on the grounds that the planned road was not of a sufficiently high standard to redesignate it as part of the main A140 trunk road.

In 2023, permission was granted for a 2.5-mile (4.0 km) single carriageway bypass around the east of the town, as part of a project to build 1,800 new homes and a primary school. Construction began on 28 May 2024.

=== Buses ===
Konectbus and Simonds operate local bus services, which connect the town with Norwich, Diss, Harleston and Horsford.

=== Railway ===
The Great Eastern Main Line passes 1 mi (1.6 km) to the western edge of the town, but there have been no railway stations in the area since Forncett closed in 1966. Railfuture East Anglia is campaigning for a new station to be opened, which would be five minutes away by road from the town centre.

== Notable residents ==
- Charles Henville Bayly, cricketer and rector of Stratton St Michael between 1839 and 1873
- Margaret Lumley Brown, occult figure and leader of the Fraternity of the Inner Light from 1946
- Sir Owen Wansbrough-Jones, army officer, leading academic chemist, and Chief Scientist to the Ministry of Supply between 1953 and 1959.

== See also ==
- Listed buildings in Long Stratton
