= River Tas =

River in Norfolk, England

Tas
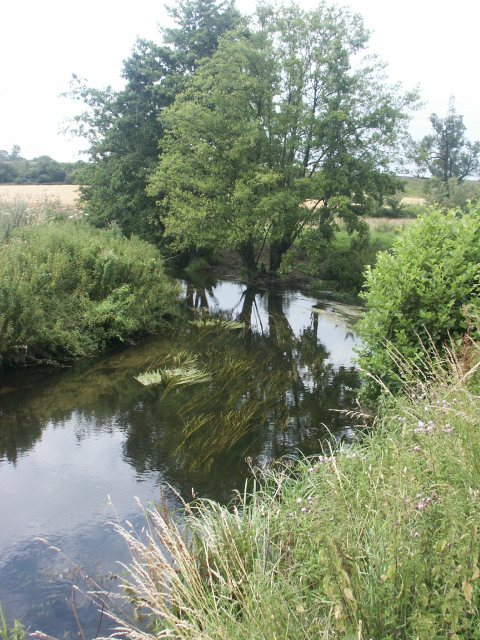
- The river at Caistor St. Edmund

- Location of the river mouth within Norfolk

Location
- Country: England
- Region: Norfolk

Physical characteristics
- Source
  - location: Carleton Rode
  - coordinates: 52.4849°N 1.1021°E
  - elevation: 51 m (167 ft)
- Mouth: River Yare
  - location: Trowse
  - coordinates: 52.6089°N 1.3069°E
  - elevation: 3 m (9.8 ft)

Basin features
- River system: River Yare
- Tributaries
  - right: Hempnall Beck

The River Tas and its tributaries in South Norfolk.

The River Tas is a river which flows northwards through South Norfolk in England - towards Norwich. The area is named the Tas Valley after the river. The name of the river is back-formed from the name of village of Tasburgh.

Despite flowing over varied geology, the river is classed as a Chalk stream.

Tributaries which have their sources at Hempnall and Carleton Rode converge at Tasburgh. The river then flows on through Newton Flotman and Smockmill Common. In Shotesham Park the river splits into two channels which rejoin just above Shotesham ford. The pool here is a popular location in summer time for paddling, swimming and fishing. From Shotesham the river flows northwards through Stoke Holy Cross, Dunston, Caistor St Edmund, Markshall and Arminghall. It joins the River Yare at Trowse, just south of Norwich.

The Tas valley contains many interesting historical sites including: an Iron Age hill fort at Tasburgh, the old Roman settlement of Venta Icenorum (now Caistor St Edmund) and the site of a woodhenge at Arminghall. The mill at Stoke Holy Cross was the first location of the Colman's mustard business.

In Roman times the River Tas was considerably larger and provided a major transport route for the inhabitants of Venta Icenorum. Today it is a small river which winds through farmland.

It contains roach, dace, occasional trout, small pike and some chub.
