= Saxlingham Nethergate =

Village in Norfolk, England

Coordinates: 52.52794°N 1.28461°E

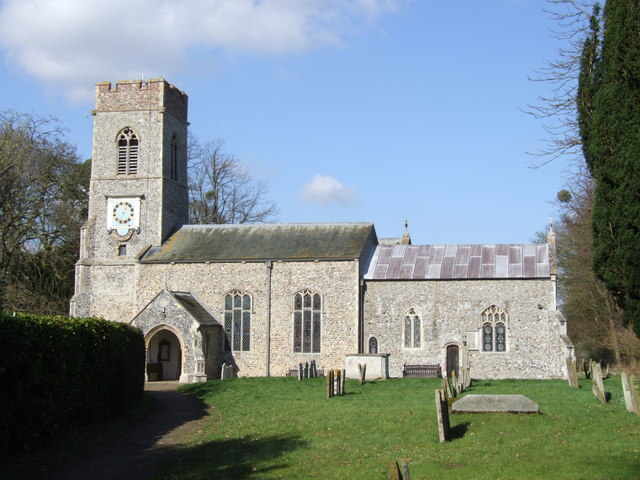
- St Mary's parish church

- Location within Norfolk
- Area: 8.55 km^{2} (3.30 sq mi)
- Population: 688 (2011)
  - Density: 80/km^{2} (210/sq mi)
- OS grid reference: TM229973
- Civil parish: Saxlingham Nethergate
- District: South Norfolk
- Shire county: Norfolk
- Region: East
- Country: England
- Sovereign state: United Kingdom
- Post town: NORWICH
- Postcode district: NR15
- Dialling code: 01508
- Police: Norfolk
- Fire: Norfolk
- Ambulance: East of England
- UK Parliament: South Norfolk

Saxlingham Nethergate is a village and civil parish in Norfolk, England, about 9.5 miles (15 km) south of Norwich.

The civil parish has an area of 3.3 square miles (8.5 km^{2}) and the 2001 Census recorded a population of 676 in 276 households, the population increasing to 688 at the 2011 Census. For the purposes of local government, the parish falls within the district of South Norfolk. The Church of England parish church of St. Mary is Decorated Gothic, with a chancel, nave and square west tower with a ring of eight bells. In 1867 the church was thoroughly restored, the nave enlarged, a vestry added and a stained glass window inserted in the tower: several of the other windows are stained glass.
Saxlingham Nethergate Church of England Primary school is a mixed school for ages 4 - 11 with a capacity of 77 pupils and was rated GOOD in its 2018 Ofsted inspection

== Recreation ==
The Saxlingham Cricket Club is home to the Saxlingham Gents cricket team which plays in the Norfolk Alliance league in Division Six.
The recreation ground in the village hosts the cricket pitch, Saxon Bowls Club and the 43rd Saxlingham Nethergate Scout Group.

== Notable residents ==
- Michael Andrews (artist)
- Samuel William King (1821–1868), rector of Saxlingham Nethergate and geologist
- Richard K. Morgan
- Eddie 'Bertie' Boulter DFC (1923-2010), WWII RAF pilot, inventor of the balanced flue boiler, author.
- Eric Pleasants, one of the few British members of the SS and a Gulag internee.

== See also ==
- HMS Saxlingham, a Ham-class minesweeper
