= Besthorpe =

Besthorpe may refer to:

- Besthorpe, Norfolk
- Besthorpe, Nottinghamshire
