= Luckhurst =

Luckhurst may refer to:

- Brian Luckhurst, English cricketer
- David Luckhurst, architect of Friars Quay (Norwich)
- Geoffrey Luckhurst, British chemist and 1973 recipient of the Corday-Morgan medal
- Mark 'Snake' Luckhurst, member of UK hard rock band Thunder
- Mary Luckhurst, Professor in Modern Drama and Editor
- Michael Christopher Wilbert "Mick" Luckhurst, American football placekicker
- Tim Luckhurst, academic, journalist and former editor of The Scotsman
