= Pattesley =

Scattered village in Norfolk, England

Coordinates: 52.781°N 0.814°E

Pattesley is a village in the English county of Norfolk, about one mile (1.6 km) south of the village of Oxwick. It consists of a few scattered houses. The population is included in the civil parish of Colkirk.

== History ==
After the Norman Conquest, William the Conqueror granted the village to Lord Peter de Valognes, who let Roger de Pattesley administer it on his behalf.

Pattesley was mentioned in the 1067 Domesday Book survey. During the reign of Elizabeth I of England, it was briefly donated by Sir Christopher Heydon to Caius College, which soon exchanged the manor with Sir Roger Townshend of Raynham.

The village once supported a church consecrated to Saint John the Baptist, though this is recorded as a remnant as early as 1831 and was abandoned on the 16th century, according to some sources. The church building was later incorporated into a farmhouse known as Pattesley House or Pattesley Cottage, now a Grade II*listed building

The recorded population of the village in 1861 was only ten.

== Other uses ==
The village name is used by a singing group, "The Pattesley Singers", based in nearby Colkirk.
