= Hemblington =

Village in Norfolk, England

Coordinates: 52.6503°N 1.4772°E

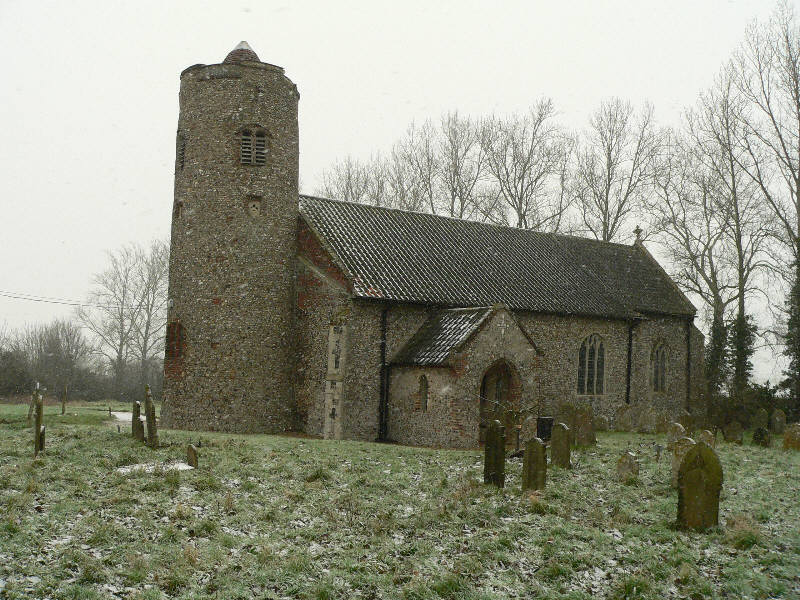
- All Saints' Church

- Location within Norfolk
- Area: 1.17 sq mi (3.0 km^{2})
- Population: 384 (2021 census)
  - Density: 328/sq mi (127/km^{2})
- OS grid reference: TG353115
- Civil parish: Hemblington
- District: Broadland
- Shire county: Norfolk
- Region: East
- Country: England
- Sovereign state: United Kingdom
- Post town: NORWICH
- Postcode district: NR13
- Dialling code: 01603
- Police: Norfolk
- Fire: Norfolk
- Ambulance: East of England
- UK Parliament: Broadland and Fakenham

Hemblington is a village and civil parish in the English county of Norfolk. The parish also includes the smaller village of Pedham.

Hemblington is located 2.8 miles (4.5 km) west of Acle and 7.8 miles (12.6 km) east of Norwich.

== History ==
Hemblington's name is of Anglo-Saxon origin and derives from the Old English for Hemele's settlement.

In the Domesday Book, Hemblington is listed as a settlement of 39 households hundred of Walsham. In 1086, the village was part of the East Anglian estates of King William I and William de Beaufeu.

Hemblington Hall is an 18th-century brick manor house which was built as the residence of the Heath family.

In 1997, a group of metal detectorists reported seeing an unidentified flying object in the skies above a field in the parish. The object took the form of flashing lights of various colours which suddenly disappeared.

== Geography ==
According to the 2021 census, Hemblington has a population of 384 people compared to 332 people recorded in the 2011 census.

== All Saints' Church ==
Hemblington's parish church dates from the Twelfth Century and is one of Norfolk's 124 remaining round-tower churches. All Saints' is located outside of the village on Church Lane and has been Grade I listed since 1962. The church holds Sunday service once a month and ha been restored with the help of the National Churches Trust.

All Saints' features a Fifteenth Century font which was authentically repainted in the 1930s by the art historian, Ernest William Tristram, who also restored a large wall painting of Saint Christopher.

== Governance ==
Hemblington is part of the electoral ward of Blofield with South Walsham for local elections and is part of the district of Broadland.

The village's national constituency is Broadland and Fakenham which has been represented by the Conservative Party's Jerome Mayhew MP since 2019.

== War Memorial ==
Hemblington's war memorials are two stone plaques inside All Saints' Church which list the following names for the First World War:

Rank	Name	Unit	Date of death	Burial/Commemoration
Sjt.	William A. Evans	8th Bn., Durham Light Infantry	5 Nov. 1916	Warlencourt British Cemetery
LCpl.	James Clare	195th Coy., Machine Gun Corps	7 Aug. 1917	Menin Gate
Pte.	James Browne (Note: Private Browne had been employed as a gamekeeper in Hemblington before enlisting.)	13th Bn., Royal Fusiliers	14 Nov. 1916	Thiepval Memorial

The following names were added after the Second World War:

Rank	Name	Unit	Date of death	Burial/Commemoration
SqLdr	George E. Weston DFC (Note: Squadron Leader Weston emigrated to New Zealand at an early age and enlisted in the Royal Air Force in 1938. He was awarded the Distinguished Flying Cross whilst persisting in an air raid on an enemy vessel at harbour in Brest despite the fact his starboard engine had stopped working. Weston was killed when his Avro Lancaster failed to take off from RAF Woolfox Lodge.)	No. 61 Squadron RAF	1 Oct. 1942	All Saints' Churchyard
FSgt.	Godfrey R. Weston (Note: Flight Sergeant Weston was the brother of the above and was born in Dunedin, New Zealand in 1922. He enlisted in 1942 and was killed serving as Bombardier in a Short Stirling crash-landing at RAF Stradishall in 1944.)	Royal New Zealand Air Force	20 Apr. 1944	All Saints' Churchyard
Gdsm.	Benjamin D. Barber	1st Bn., Coldstream Guards	30 May 1940	Veurne Cemetery
Dvr.	Ronald Hylton	15 Coy., R. Army Service Corps	12 Jun. 1943	Benghazi War Cemetery
Dvr.	Cyril W. Hylton	838 Coy., R.A.S.C.	4 May 1945	Holten War Cemetery
