= Marlingford and Colton =

Civil parish in Norfolk, England

Coordinates: 52.641709°N 1.132793°E

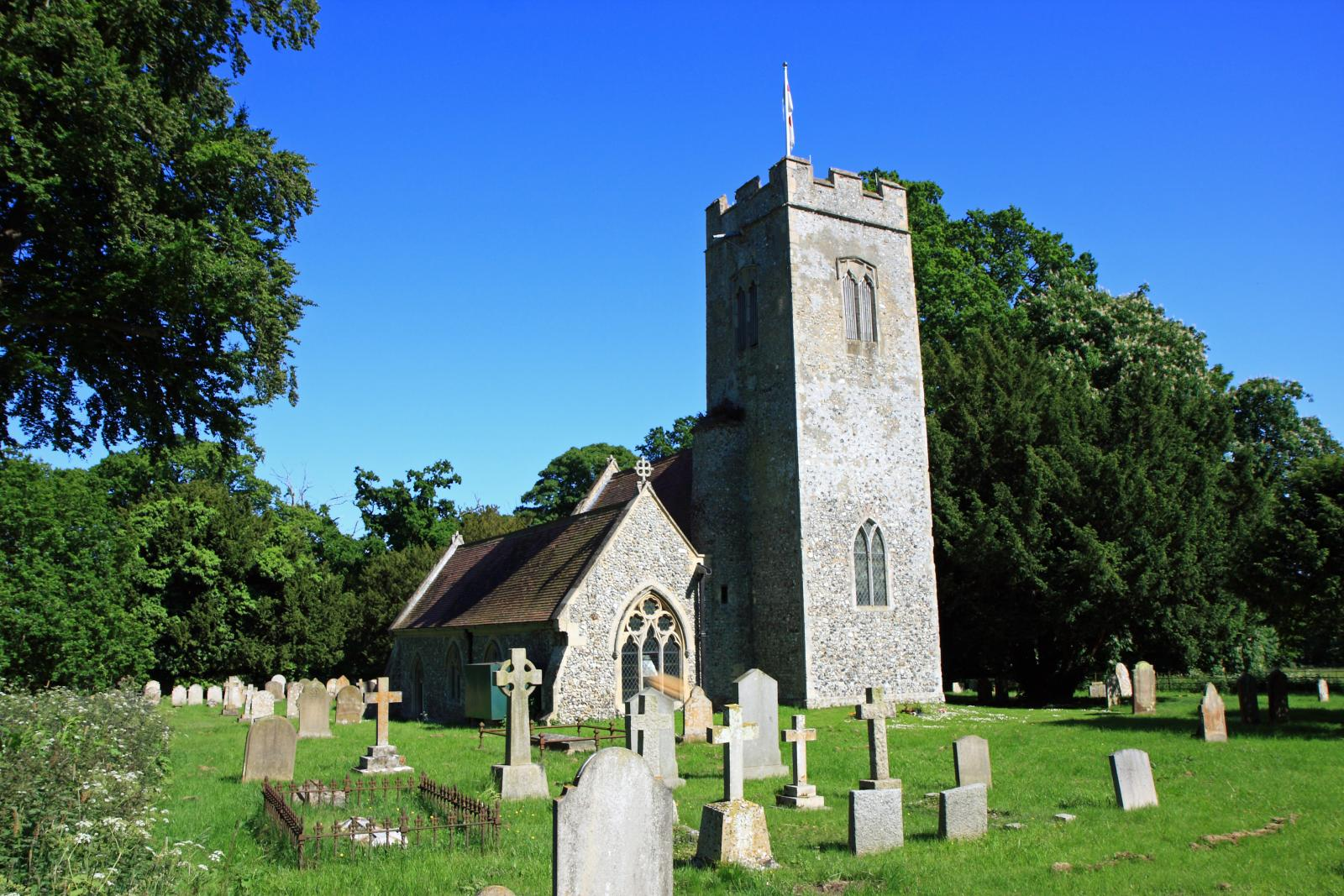
- Marlingford church

- Location within Norfolk
- Area: 6.62 km^{2} (2.56 sq mi)
- Population: 375 (2011)
  - Density: 57/km^{2} (150/sq mi)
- OS grid reference: TG120094
- Civil parish: Marlingford and Colton
- District: South Norfolk
- Shire county: Norfolk
- Region: East
- Country: England
- Sovereign state: United Kingdom
- Post town: NORWICH
- Postcode district: NR9
- Dialling code: 01603
- Police: Norfolk
- Fire: Norfolk
- Ambulance: East of England

Marlingford and Colton, formerly Marlingford is a civil parish in the English county of Norfolk, made from the villages of Colton and Marlingford. It covers an area of 6.62 km^{2} (2.56 sq mi) and had a population of 384 in 148 households at the 2001 census, the population reducing to 375 at the 2011 Census. For the purposes of local government, it falls within the district of South Norfolk.

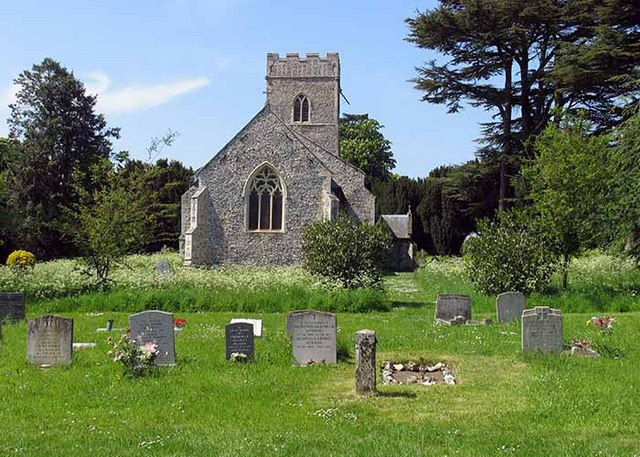
Colton church

== History ==
The parish of Colton was merged with Marlingford on 1 April 1935. In 2001 the parish was renamed from "Marlingford" to "Marlingford and Colton".
