= Forncett End =

Village in Norfolk, England

Coordinates: 52.499306°N 1.155583°E

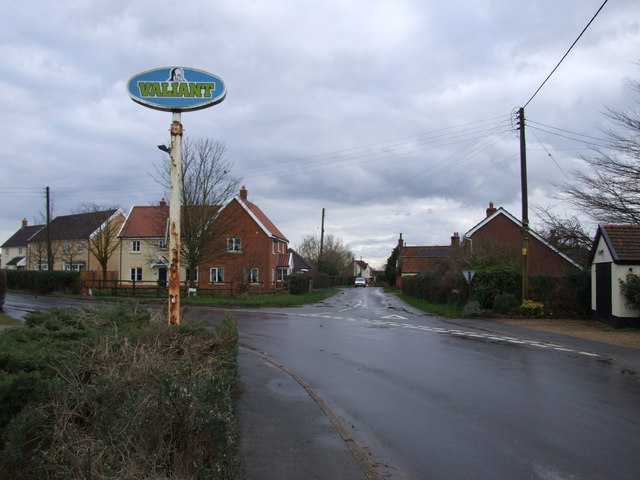
- Forncett End

- Location within Norfolk
- Population: 1,061 (2020 estimate)
- OS grid reference: TM165928
- Civil parish: Forncett
- District: South Norfolk
- Shire county: Norfolk
- Region: East
- Country: England
- Sovereign state: United Kingdom
- Post town: NORWICH
- Postcode district: NR16
- Dialling code: 01508
- Police: Norfolk
- Fire: Norfolk
- Ambulance: East of England
- UK Parliament: Waveney Valley

Forncett End is a village in the civil parish of Forncett, in the South Norfolk district, in the English county of Norfolk. In 2020 it had an estimated population of 1061.

== Places of interest ==
- Church of St Edmund

== See also ==
- List of places in Norfolk
