= Places of interest in Norfolk =

This is a list of places of interest in the county of Norfolk, England. See List of places in Norfolk for a list of settlements in the county.

== Places of interest ==
=== Gardens ===
- Fairhaven Woodland and Water Garden
- Gooderstone Water Gardens
- Priory Maze

=== Areas of interest ===
- The Norfolk Broads – part of The Broads National Park
- North Norfolk Heritage Coast
- Sheringham Park – National Trust

=== Nature reserves ===
- Norfolk Wildlife Trust
- National Nature Reserves in Norfolk
- RSPB nature reserves (Royal Society for the Protection of Birds):
  - Berney Marshes, Breydon Water, Halvergate Marshes, Snettisham, Strumpshaw Fen, Titchwell Marsh

=== Houses, castles and churches ===
- Blickling Hall, Felbrigg Hall, Oxburgh Hall – National Trust
- Walsingham Abbey and Shrine
- Wymondham Abbey (see also Historic houses in England)
- Castle Acre Priory
- Holkham Hall

=== Footpaths ===
- Long distance footpaths:
  - Angles Way, Fen Rivers Way, Nar Valley Way, North Norfolk Coastal Path, Peddars Way, Weavers' Way
- Other footpaths:
  - Bure Valley Path, Great Eastern Pingo Trail, Marriott's Way, Paston Way, Tas Valley Way

=== Heritage sites ===
- Heritage railways:
  - Bressingham Steam Museum, Bure Valley Railway, Mid-Norfolk Railway, East Anglian Railway Museum, North Norfolk Railway
- Norwich Castle Museum
- Norfolk Windmills Trust
- Norfolk wherry – a black-sailed trader
- City of Norwich Aviation Museum
