= Fishley =

Village in Norfolk, England

Coordinates: 52.64801°N 1.544695°E

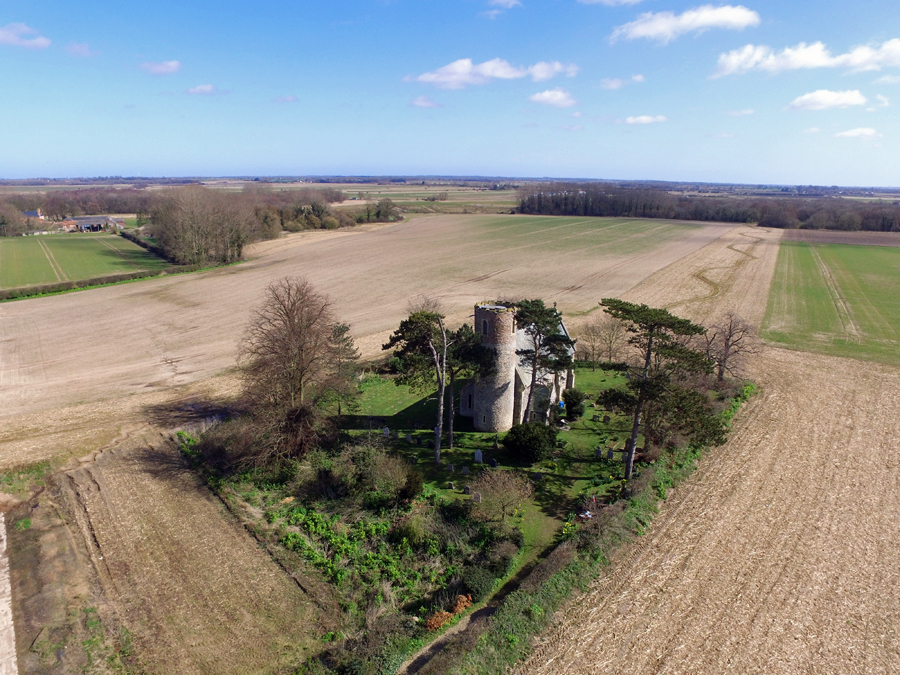
- St. Mary's Church, Fishley

- Location within Norfolk
- OS grid reference: TG 40142 11851
  - London: 105 miles (169 km)
- Civil parish: Upton with Fishley
- District: Broadland
- Shire county: Norfolk
- Region: East
- Country: England
- Sovereign state: United Kingdom
- Post town: Norwich
- Postcode district: NR13
- Dialling code: 01493
- UK Parliament: Broadland and Fakenham

Fishley is a village in the English county of Norfolk, forming part of the civil parish of Upton with Fishley.

Fishley is located 0.5 miles (0.80 km) north of Acle and 11 miles (18 km) east of Norwich.

== History ==
Fishley's name is of Anglo-Saxon origin and derives from the Old English for fisherman's clearing.

In the Domesday Book, Fishley is listed as a settlement of 34 households located in the hundred of Walsham. In 1086, the village was divided between the East Anglian estates of King William I, St Benet's Abbey and William d'Ecouis.

Fishley Hall was built as a manor-house in the Eighteenth Century and features ornate Georgian gardens and an approach drive. The hall was derelict by 1999 but is today fully restored and operates as a venue of wedding receptions.

== Geography ==
Fishley is located close to the course of the River Bure.

== St. Mary's Church ==
Fishley's church is dedicated to Saint Mary and is one of Norfolk's 124 remaining Anglo-Saxon round-tower churches, dating from the Thirteenth Century. St. Mary's has been Grade II listed since 1962.

St. Mary's was heavily restored in the Nineteenth Century, in a fashion that did not preserve most of its Medieval features.

== Governance ==
Fishley is part of the electoral ward of Blofield with South Walsham for local elections and is part of the district of Broadland.

The village's national constituency is Broadland and Fakenham which has been represented by the Conservative Party's Jerome Mayhew MP since 2019.
