= Black Carr =

Hamlet in Norfolk, England

Coordinates: 52.519°N 1.087°E

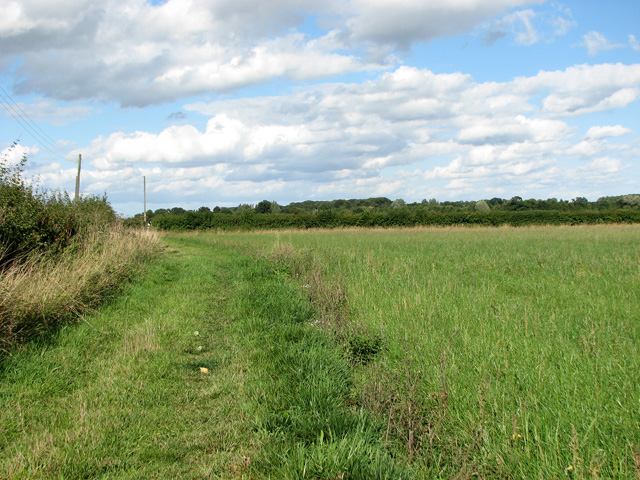
- Back Carr

- Location within Norfolk
- Civil parish: Besthorpe
- District: Breckland
- Shire county: Norfolk
- Region: East
- Country: England
- Sovereign state: United Kingdom

Black Carr is a hamlet in the Breckland district of Norfolk, England near Old Buckenham Airfield. It forms part of the civil parish of Besthorpe.

Archaeological evidence of Roman settlements have been found in the area. Its nearest village is Spooner Row and its nearest town is Attleborough. It has a triangular area of grass which used to be a common and has a rustic pond. Many of the houses here are timber framed and from as early as the 15th century. The name "Black Carr" describes the black boggy mud that the area has.
