= Toftrees =

Village in Norfolk, England

Coordinates: 52.81306°N 0.81612°E

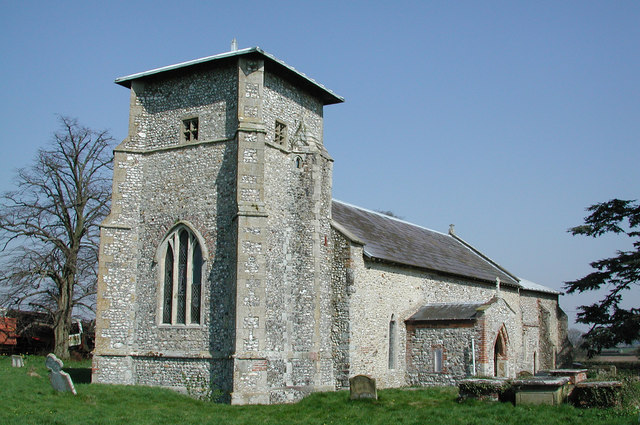
- The parish church of All Saints, Toftrees, Norfolk

- Location within Norfolk
- OS grid reference: TF890270
  - London: 113 miles (182 km)
- Civil parish: Dunton
- District: North Norfolk
- Shire county: Norfolk
- Region: East
- Country: England
- Sovereign state: United Kingdom
- Post town: FAKENHAM
- Postcode district: NR21
- Dialling code: 01328
- Police: Norfolk
- Fire: Norfolk
- Ambulance: East of England
- UK Parliament: North Norfolk

Toftrees is a village and former civil parish, now in the parish of Dunton, in the North Norfolk district, in the county of Norfolk, England. The hamlet is 2.3 miles south west of Fakenham, 27.3 miles north west of Norwich and 113 miles north north east of London. The nearest railway station is at Sheringham for the Bittern Line which runs between Sheringham, Cromer and Norwich. The nearest airport is Norwich International Airport. The village is situated on the north west side of the A1065 Fakenham to Swaffham road. In 1931 the parish had a population of 72.

== History ==
There is evidence that there has been a settlement here from Roman times as it is located at a junction of Roman roads or trackways.

Toftrees has an entry in the Domesday Book of 1086 In the great book Toftrees is recorded by the names Toffas, and Toftes, the main landholders being William de Warenne and Peter de Valognes. The survey also mentions the church and there are said to be 12 wild mares. On 1 April 1935 the parish was abolished to form Dunton.
