= Dunton, Norfolk =

Village in Norfolk, England

Coordinates: 52.83744°N 0.78817°E

Dunton
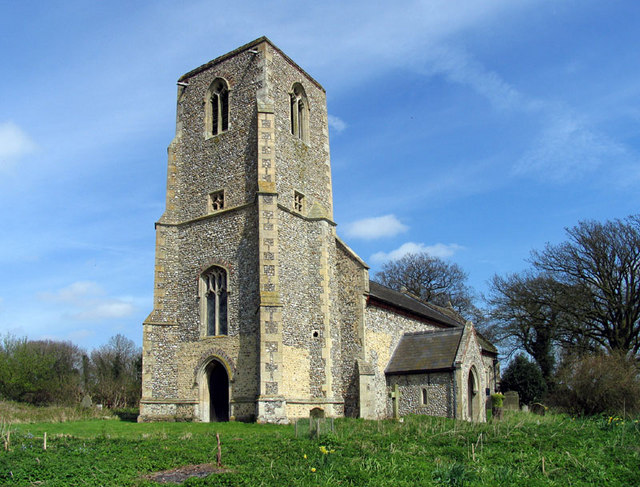
- St. Peter's Church

- Location within Norfolk
- Area: 6.00 sq mi (15.5 km^{2})
- Population: 111 (2021 census)
  - Density: 19/sq mi (7.3/km^{2})
- OS grid reference: TF879303
- Civil parish: Dunton
- District: North Norfolk
- Shire county: Norfolk
- Region: East
- Country: England
- Sovereign state: United Kingdom
- Post town: FAKENHAM
- Postcode district: NR21
- Dialling code: 07745
- Police: Norfolk
- Fire: Norfolk
- Ambulance: East of England
- UK Parliament: Broadland and Fakenham

Dunton is a village and civil parish in the North Norfolk district, of the English county of Norfolk.

Dunton is located about 3.1 miles (5.0 km) west of Fakenham and 25 miles (40 km) north-west of Norwich.

== History ==
Dunton's name is of Anglo-Saxon origin and derives from the Old English for a farmstead or settlement either situated on a hill or with ducks.

In the Domesday Book, Dunton is listed as a settlement of 25 households in the hundred of Brothercross. In 1086, the village was part of the East Anglian estates of King William I.

The parish of "Dunton" was formed on 1 April 1935 from the villages of Dunton, Shereford and Toftrees.

During the Second World War, parts of the parish formed Sculthorpe Training Area which was built in 1942 by the United States Army Air Forces and also used by the Royal New Zealand Air Force, the Royal Australian Air Force and the Free French Air Forces.

== Geography ==
According to the 2021 census, Dunton has a population of 111 people which shows a decrease from the 126 people recorded in the 2011 census.

The A148, between King's Lynn and Cromer, and the A1065, between Mildenhall and Fakenham, both run through the parish.

== St. Peter's Church ==
Dunton's parish church is dedicated to Saint Peter and was largely built in the Fifteenth Century. St. Peter's is located on Church Road and has been Grade II listed since 1959.

The church possesses good examples of Nineteenth Century stained glass depicting scenes from the works of mercy installed by Heaton, Butler and Bayne and a depiction of Christ and Mary Magdalene by Ward and Hughes. The glass was severely damaged in 2019 by vandals but has been subsequently repaired. St. Peter's has been unused for church services since the mid-Twentieth Century and is currently in the care of the Norfolk Churches Trust.

== Governance ==
Dunton is part of the electoral ward of The Raynhams for local elections and is part of the district of Broadland.

The village's national constituency is Broadland and Fakenham which has been represented by the Conservative Party's Jerome Mayhew MP since 2019.

== War Memorial ==
Dunton's war memorial is a brass plaque inside St. Peter's Church which lists the following names for the First World War:

Rank	Name	Unit	Date of death	Burial/Commemoration
LCpl.	William H. Beets	Queen's Royal Regiment	6 Apr. 1917	St. Peter's Churchyard
Pte.	Herbert J. Marshall	4th Bn., Royal Fusiliers	14 Apr. 1917	Arras Memorial
Pte.	Charles H. Jarvis	2nd Bn., Grenadier Guards	27 Mar. 1918	Arras Memorial
Pte.	Charles Winn	4th Bn., Grenadier Gds.	25 Sep. 1916	Thiepval Memorial
Pte.	Herbert H. Brooks	1st Bn., Norfolk Regiment	22 Oct. 1914	Boulogne East Cemetery
