= List of largest settlements in Norfolk by population =

The places in Norfolk with the greatest populations
Other Norfolk towns

This is a list of settlements in Norfolk by population based on the results of the UK 2011 census. The last UK census was in 2021. In that census, there were 25 urban subdivisions in Norfolk with 5,000 or more inhabitants:.

Rank	Settlement	Borough/District	Population		
Rank	Settlement	Borough/District	2001	2011	2021
1	Norwich/Thorpe St Andrew	Norwich/Broadland	173,477	186,408	200,752
2	King's Lynn	King's Lynn and West Norfolk	39,857	44,830	47,610
3	Great Yarmouth	Great Yarmouth	24,516	28,165	28,982
4	Thetford	Breckland	21,855	24,649	25,492
5	Gorleston-on-Sea	Great Yarmouth	23,200	24,741	24,481
6	Dereham	Breckland	17,510	20,171	20,785
7	Wymondham	South Norfolk	11,364	13,064	16,335
8	Taverham	Broadland	15,144	15,390	14,989
9	North Walsham	North Norfolk	11,845	12,463	12,829
10	Bradwell	Great Yarmouth	10,316	10,528	11,828
11	Watton	Breckland	7,625	8,951	11,543
12	Downham Market	King's Lynn and West Norfolk	6,734	9,994	11,342
13	Attleborough	Breckland	8,799	9,582	11,232
14	Diss	South Norfolk	7,615	8,537	9,599
15	Caister-on-Sea	Great Yarmouth	8,867	9,016	9,095
16	Swaffham	Breckland	6,885	7,208	8,434
17	Fakenham	North Norfolk	7,730	7,986	8,385
18	Cromer	North Norfolk	7,828	7,766	7,524
19	Aylsham	Broadland	5,434	5,906	7,184
20	Poringland	South Norfolk	4,573	5,132	7,104
21	Sheringham	North Norfolk	7,143	7,367	7,093
22	Hethersett	South Norfolk	5,397	5,648	7,021
23	Hemsby	Great Yarmouth	5,214	5,407	5,721
24	Long Stratton	South Norfolk	3,911	4,813	5,215
25	Harleston	South Norfolk	3,899	4,458	5,075
