= Colton, Norfolk =

Village in Norfolk, England

Coordinates: 52.645147°N 1.116226°E

Colton
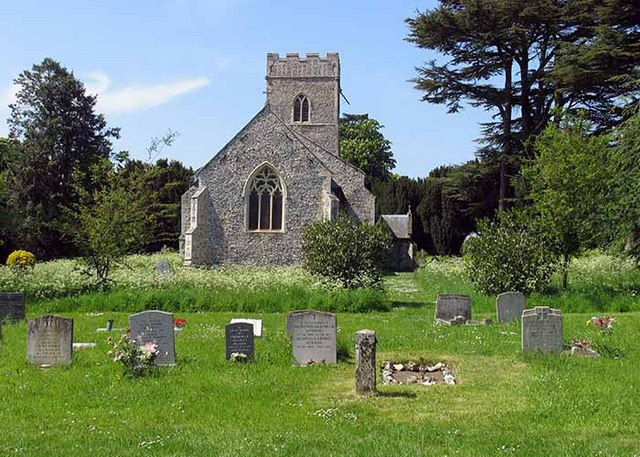
- St. Andrew's Church

- Location within Norfolk
- OS grid reference: TG109098
- Civil parish: Marlingford and Colton
- District: South Norfolk
- Shire county: Norfolk
- Region: East
- Country: England
- Sovereign state: United Kingdom
- Post town: NORWICH
- Postcode district: NR9
- Dialling code: 01603
- Police: Norfolk
- Fire: Norfolk
- Ambulance: East of England
- UK Parliament: South Norfolk

Colton is a village and former civil parish, now in the parish of Marlingford and Colton, in the South Norfolk district, in the English county of Norfolk.

Colton is located 8.3 miles (13.4 km) south of Reepham and 7.7 miles (12.4 km) west of Norwich.

== History ==
Colton's name is of Anglo-Saxon origin and derives from the Old English for Cola's farmstead or settlement.

Colton was recorded in the Domesday Book of 1086 as Coletuna, a settlement of 2 households in the hundred of Forehoe. The village was part of the estate of William de Warenne.

On 1 April 1935 the parish was abolished and merged with Marlingford. In 2001 the new parish was renamed "Marlingford and Colton".

The Norfolk Lurcher pub on High House Farm Lane which first opened in 1991 was called the Ugly Bug Inn until 2007.

== Geography ==
In 1931, the parish had a population of 175. This was the last time separate population statistics were collated for Colton.

== St. Andrew's Church ==
Colton's parish church is dedicated to Saint Andrew and dates from the fourteenth century. St. Andrew's is located on Church Lane and has been Grade II listed since 1983.

St. Andrew's was re-roofed in the seventeenth century and restored in the Victorian era. The church boasts a Victorian organ and a medieval wall-painting depicting the dangers of gossip.

== Governance ==
Colton is part of the electoral ward of Easton for local elections and is part of the district of South Norfolk.

The village's national constituency is South Norfolk which has been represented by the Labour Party's Ben Goldsborough MP since 2024.

== War Memorial ==
Colton's war memorial are two plaques (one stone and another brass) located inside St. Andrew's Church. The stone memorial lists the following names for the First World War:

Rank	Name	Unit	Date of death	Burial
LCpl.	Herbert Brown	9th Bn., Norfolk Regiment	1 May 1917	Loos Memorial
LCpl.	Frederick H. Davey	9th Bn., Suffolk Regiment	25 Sep. 1915	Loos Memorial
Pte.	Daniel A. Shingles	5th Bn., Duke of Wellington's Regiment	4 Sep. 1918	Denain Cemetery
Pte.	Edward Loveday	1/5th Bn., East Surrey Regiment	26 Mar. 1919	All Saints' Churchyard
Pte.	Reginald Stone	7th Bn., Norfolk Regiment	12 Oct. 1916	Cabaret-Rouge Cemetery
Pte.	George I. Fenn	11th Bn., Royal Sussex Regiment	21 Oct. 1916	Thiepval Memorial

And, the brass memorial lists the following name for the Second World War:

Rank	Name	Unit	Date of death	Burial
Mne.	Graham G. Dunnell	Royal Marines att. HMS Hood	24 May 1941	Portsmouth Naval Memorial
