= Upton with Fishley =

Civil parish in Norfolk, England

Coordinates: 52.65452°N 1.545382°E

- Location within Norfolk
- Area: 8.93 km^{2} (3.45 sq mi)
- Population: 702 (2011)
  - Density: 79/km^{2} (200/sq mi)
- OS grid reference: TG398122
- Civil parish: Upton with Fishley
- District: Broadland
- Shire county: Norfolk
- Region: East
- Country: England
- Sovereign state: United Kingdom
- Post town: NORWICH
- Postcode district: NR13
- Police: Norfolk
- Fire: Norfolk
- Ambulance: East of England

Upton with Fishley is a civil parish in the English county of Norfolk, consisting of the former parishes of Upton and Fishley, including the hamlet of Cargate Green.

The parish covers an area of 8.93 km^{2} (3.45 sq mi) and had a population of 660 in 272 households at the 2001 census, increasing to a population of 702 also in 272 households at the 2011 Census.

For the purposes of local government, it falls within the district of Broadland.
