= Hemblington Hall =

Farmhouse in Norfolk, England

Coordinates: 52°38′55″N 1°28′29″E

Hemblington Hall

Hemblington Hall is a large farmhouse in Norfolk county, England, built around 1700 with a Georgian facade. This grade II listed building was the home of the Heath family during the 18th and 19th centuries. The nearby All Saints Church contains memorials to many members of the Heath family. By the 19th century Hemblington Hall was part of the Burlingham Hall Estate owned by the Burroughes family until it was sold off in 1919.

Hemblington Hall is listed in Nikolaus Pevsner's guide to the buildings of England and is featured in the Burkes and Savills guide to country houses.
