= RRH Trimingham =

RRH Trimingham
- Part of RRH Neatishead
- Near Trimingham, Norfolk in England
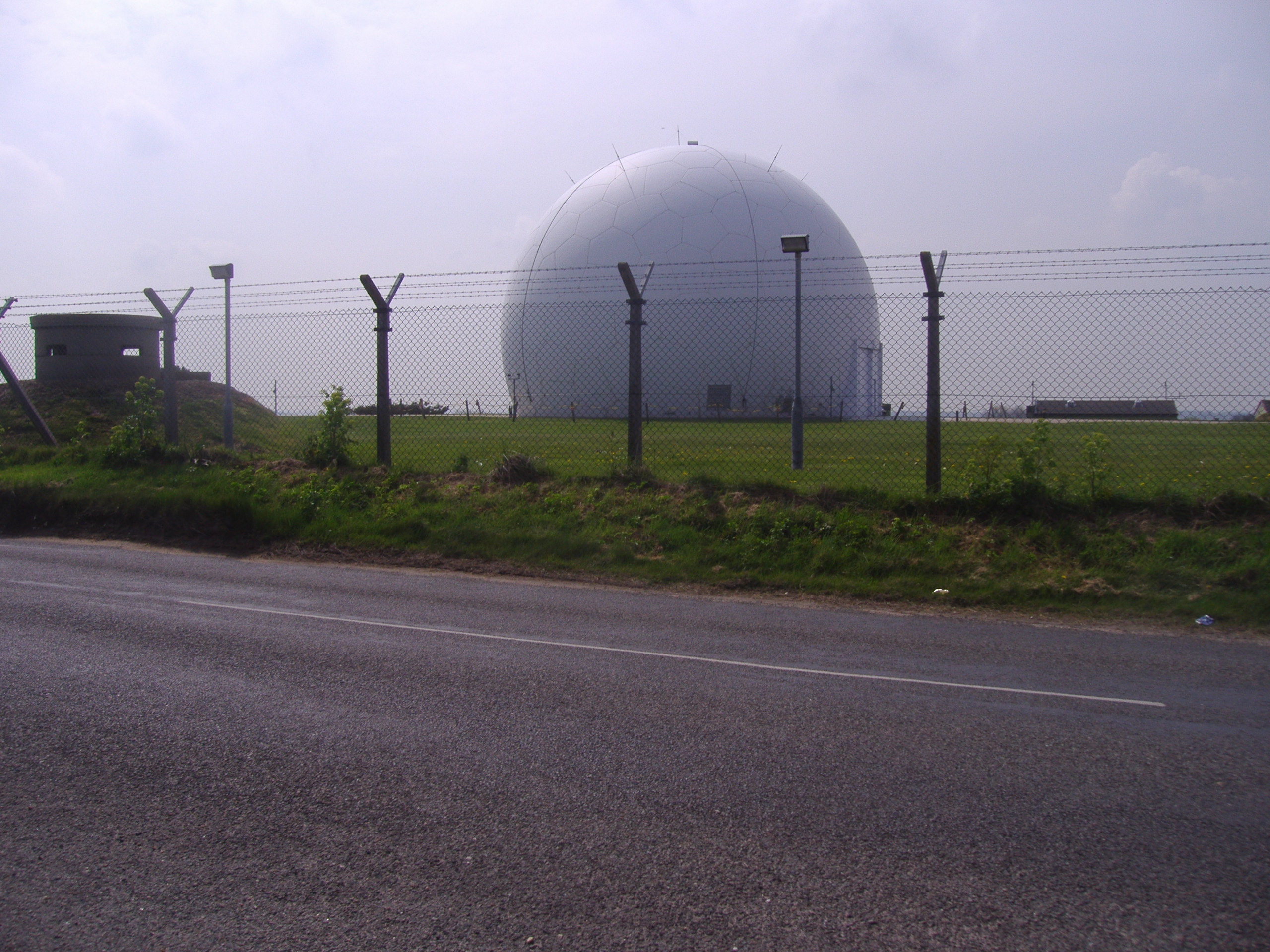
- Radar dome at RRH Trimingham.

Site information
- Type: Remote Radar Head
- Owner: Ministry of Defence
- Operator: Royal Air Force
- Controlled by: No. 1 Group (Air Combat)
- Condition: Dismantled
- Radar type: Lockheed Martin AN/TPS-77 (Type 92) Air Defence Radar

Location
- Shown within Norfolk
- Coordinates: 52°53′34″N 001°24′02″E

Site history
- Built: 1941
- In use: 1941 – 2023

Garrison information
- Occupants: Radar Flight (South)

Remote Radar Head Trimingham or RRH Trimingham is a former TPS-77 radar station situated on the coast in the English county of Norfolk. The site is located on the coast road between Cromer and Mundesley, 1 kilometre east of the village of Trimingham but the activity has now moved to RRH Neatishead due to the threat from coastal erosion. The radar station was a satellite station of RAF Neatishead (grid reference TG289382). This radar station was controlled and maintained by a section of Radar Technicians and Operators and supported by a team of Ground Engineers. Trimingham provided extensive coverage of the east coast of the United Kingdom and helped contribute to the recognised air picture and defence of the United Kingdom. The Type 93 became operational on the site in April 1997.

== History ==
The radar station was established on the cliff top at Trimingham by the British Army in the latter part of 1941. It was used to detect German E-Boats and low flying aircraft and was then equipped with a CD Mk.4 radar. The station also operated as an Oboe Navigation Station. Oboe worked using two stations at different and well-separated locations in England to transmit a signal to a Mosquito Pathfinder bomber carrying a radio transponder. The transponder reflected the signals, which were then received by the two stations. The round-trip time of each signal gave the distance to the bombers and guided them to their target.

In April 1942, Trimingham was transferred from the authority of the War Office over to the Air Ministry. The site had now been installed with a Chain Home Extra Low (CHEL)/CD Type 54 radar on a 200 foot (61 m) tower. By 1945 the 'Oboe' equipment had been removed. In 1947 Trimingham was placed in the Northern Signals Area under No 90 Group. Between 1948 and 1949 the site was placed under care and maintenance.

In January 1949 the site was re-activated and in 1950 was renamed No 432 Signals Unit (No 432 SU). In June 1950 RAF Trimingham was selected to be a Centimetric Early Warning Station (CEW). Between this event and 1961 the radar station had various systems installed at the site and operated constantly as part of the UK's ROTOR early warning systems until February 1964 when the site was mothballed. By 1965 the station had been largely dismantled and all the radar arrays had been removed apart from the Type 54 behind Beacon Hill Cottage but that had been removed by 1972.

In 1981 RAF Trimingham was closed and the site had been sold and the guardhouse converted into a private house.

== 1980s to date ==
By the latter part of the 1980s the now Ministry of Defence decided to re-purchase the site. The RAF installed a Marconi Type 91 Martello radar acting as a Ready Platform (along with RAF Hopton and RAF Weybourne) for the UKADGE Series II (United Kingdom Air Defence Ground Environment) Radar System controlled from the R3 underground control centre at RAF Neatishead. The guardhouse was converted into staff accommodation and offices and basic mess facilities. In May 1996 the Marconi Type 91 'Martello' radar at Trimingham was sold to the Turkish Ministry of Defence and it was replaced by what used to be known as No 86 Signals Unit, with a Type 93 (Plessey type ADGE-305, NATO designation TGRI 50011) that had been moved from Hopton when that base was closed. The Type 93 was originally a mobile installation (however it never actually obtained UK Dept of Transport authorisation to be allowed on UK roads under its own power and anytime it had to be moved, civilian low-loader transport specialists had to be contracted in), but at Trimingham it was fixed to a permanent mounting, due to constant cracking issues with the frame and mobile trailer. The Kevlon dome composed of irregular polygons erected around it and became known locally as the Trimingham golf ball.

The Type 93 was replaced by the Type 101 radar, which was itself replaced by the TPS-77 radar which has increased capabilities to detect targets in the vicinity of the now prolific wind farms along the North Sea coast. According to Minister Philip Dunne, the TPS-77 radar at this station has reached Initial operation capability. Today the TPS-77 feeds constant data back to the Control and Reporting Centres (CRC's) at RAF Boulmer in Northumberland and RAF Scampton in Lincolnshire. RAF Neatishead has now been downgraded to a remote radar head which is actually at Trimingham. Neatishead only being retained as the circuits from Trimingham pass through Neatishead.

As part of a major upgrade of RRH sites around the U.K. the MOD began a programme titled HYDRA in 2020 to install new state of the art communications buildings, radar towers and bespoke perimeter security.

In July 2022, it was announced that the radar at RAF Trimingham would be moved 8 miles (13 km) to RAF Neatishead due to the threat of coastal erosion and the increased interference experienced by operators from the off-shore wind turbines; the dome was completely dismantled and removed in April 2023. The future of the current site including the mothballed R1 (Rotor Bunker) single level nuclear bunker and associated surface buildings remains unclear at the present time.

== Controversy ==
In November 2006, the station became involved in controversy when motorists on the coast road blamed the station for causing car engines and lights to cut out. Speedometer dials swung up to 150 mph as motorists drove past, and a local garage owner who runs the nearest garage at Mundesley, said he had dealt with 30 calls over a couple of months.

== See also ==
- Improved United Kingdom Air Defence Ground Environment – UK air defence radar system in the UK between the 1990s and 2000s
- Linesman/Mediator – UK air defence radar system in the UK between the 1960s and 1984
- List of Royal Air Force stations
- NATO Integrated Air Defense System
