= Podmore =

Podmore is an English surname. Notable people with the surname include:

- Bill Podmore (1931–1994), English television producer
- Colin Podmore (born 1960), British historian and Anglican lay leader
- Edgar Podmore (1918–2000), English footballer
- Frank Podmore (1856–1910), English writer
- George Podmore (1924−2005), Australian jockey
- Harry Podmore (born 1994), English cricketer
- John Podmore, English politician

Fictional characters:

- Dave Podmore, fictional English cricketer

== See also ==
- Podmore case, English criminal case
