= Toft Monks =

Village in Norfolk, England

Coordinates: 52.494°N 1.571°E

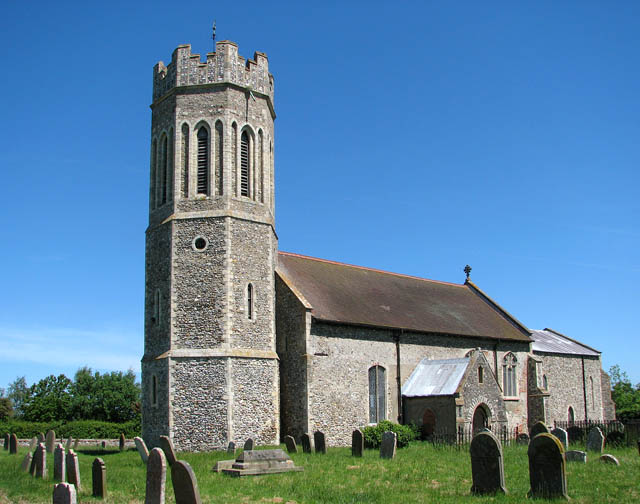
- St Margaret's church, Toft Monks

- Location within Norfolk
- Area: 6.87 km^{2} (2.65 sq mi)
- Population: 348 (2011)
  - Density: 51/km^{2} (130/sq mi)
- OS grid reference: TM425945
- District: South Norfolk
- Shire county: Norfolk
- Region: East
- Country: England
- Sovereign state: United Kingdom
- Post town: BECCLES
- Postcode district: NR34
- Police: Norfolk
- Fire: Norfolk
- Ambulance: East of England
- UK Parliament: South Norfolk

Toft Monks is a village and civil parish in Norfolk, England. It is on the border of Norfolk and Suffolk, about 4 miles (6.4 km) north of Beccles and 11 miles (18 km) south-west of Great Yarmouth. It includes the hamlets of Bull's Green and Maypole Green.

In 2001, the parish is recorded as accommodating 324 people in 131 households over 687 hectares, increasing to 348 at the 2011 Census.

The local church in the village is dedicated to St. Margaret and was originally constructed in the 13th century.

Toft Monks House is a Grade II listed Regency house built for local merchant William Grimmer in 1819.

== See also ==
- Clavering hundred
