= Wretham =

Civil parish in Norfolk, England

Coordinates: 52.479°N 0.818°E

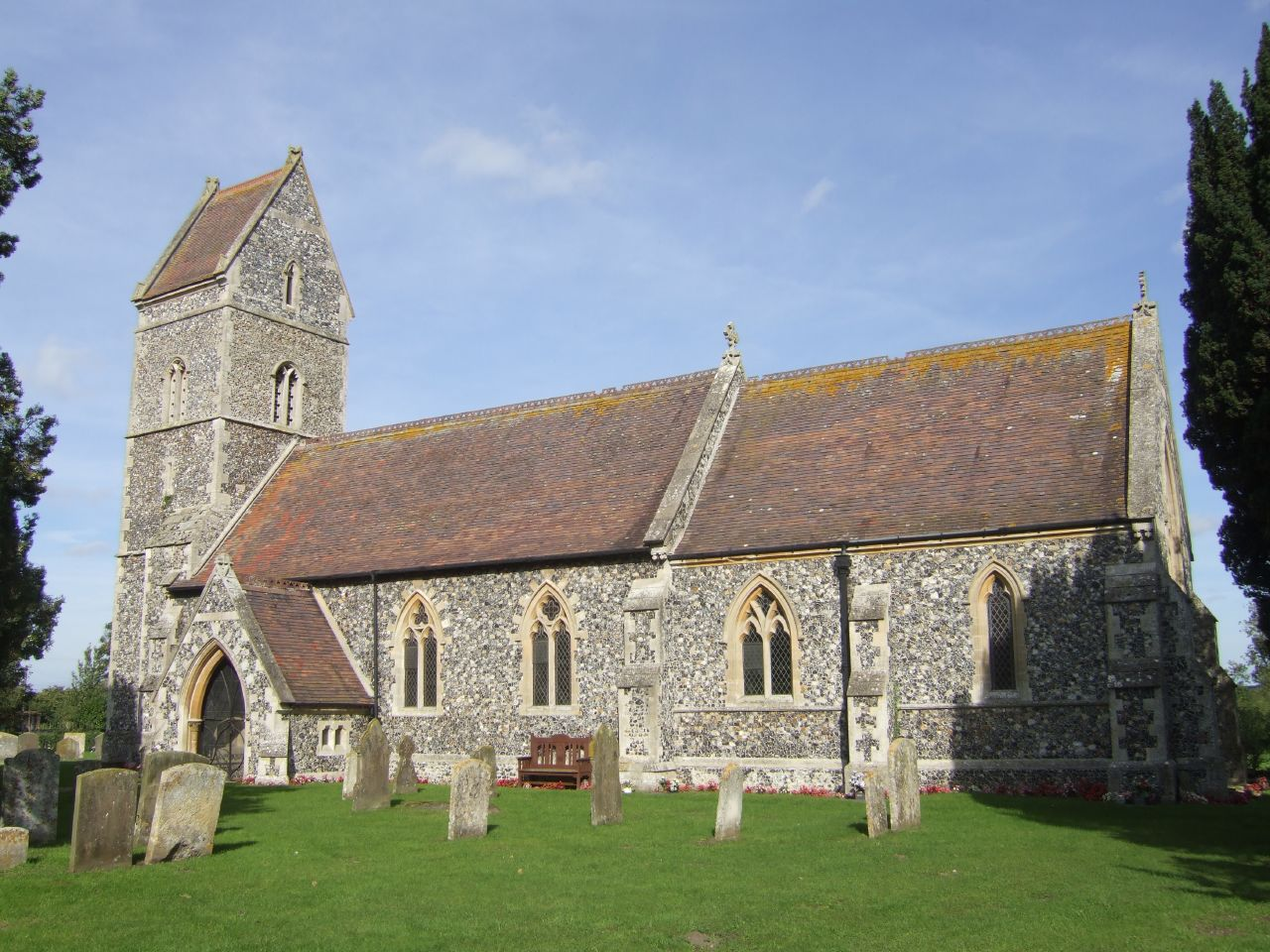
- St Ethelbert's parish church

- Location within Norfolk
- Area: 32.25 km^{2} (12.45 sq mi)
- Population: 374 (2011 Census)
  - Density: 12/km^{2} (31/sq mi)
- OS grid reference: TL915905
- Civil parish: Wretham
- District: Breckland
- Shire county: Norfolk
- Region: East
- Country: England
- Sovereign state: United Kingdom
- Post town: Thetford
- Postcode district: IP24
- Dialling code: 01953
- Police: Norfolk
- Fire: Norfolk
- Ambulance: East of England
- UK Parliament: South West Norfolk
- Website: Wretham Village Website

Wretham (/ˈrɛtəm/ RET-əm) is a civil parish in the Breckland district of Norfolk, England. The parish includes the village of East Wretham, which is about 6 miles (10 km) northeast of Thetford and 25 miles (40 km) southwest of Norwich. It also includes the villages of Illington and Stonebridge. The parish has an area of 32.25 km^{2} (12.45 sq mi). The 2011 Census recorded a parish population of 374 people in 141 households.

== History ==
The place-name "Wretham" is derived from Old English. It means "the hām (place) where crosswort grew".

The Church of England parish church of St Ethelbert in East Wretham was built in the 12th century and rebuilt in 1865. It is a Grade II* listed building.

The former parish church of St Lawrence in West Wretham was built in the 14th century and is now a ruin. It is a Scheduled Monument and Grade II listed building.

RAF East Wretham was a Royal Air Force air station. It was commissioned in 1940 and operational until November 1945. It was then a resettlement camp for Polish refugees until 1946. The former air station is now part of the British Army's Stanford Training Area (STANTA).

The licensee of the Dog and Partridge local pub opposed the smoking ban that was introduced in England in July 2007.

=== 1981 air crash ===
On Wednesday 4 February 1981 at 4pm, a F-111 aircraft of the 494th Tactical Fighter Squadron crashed. The aircrew were taken by helicopter to RAF Lakenheath. Firemen arrived from Thetford. The pilot was aged 31, and the weapon systems officer was 29.

== Bibliography ==
- Ekwall, Eilert (1960) [1936]. Concise Oxford Dictionary of English Place-Names (4th ed.). Oxford: Oxford University Press. Wretham. ISBN 0198691033.
- Pevsner, Nikolaus (1962). North-West and South Norfolk. The Buildings of England. Vol. 2. Harmondsworth: Penguin Books. pp. 391–392. ISBN 0-14-071024-8.
