= Marlingford =

Village in Norfolk, England

Coordinates: 52.638377°N 1.1484501°E

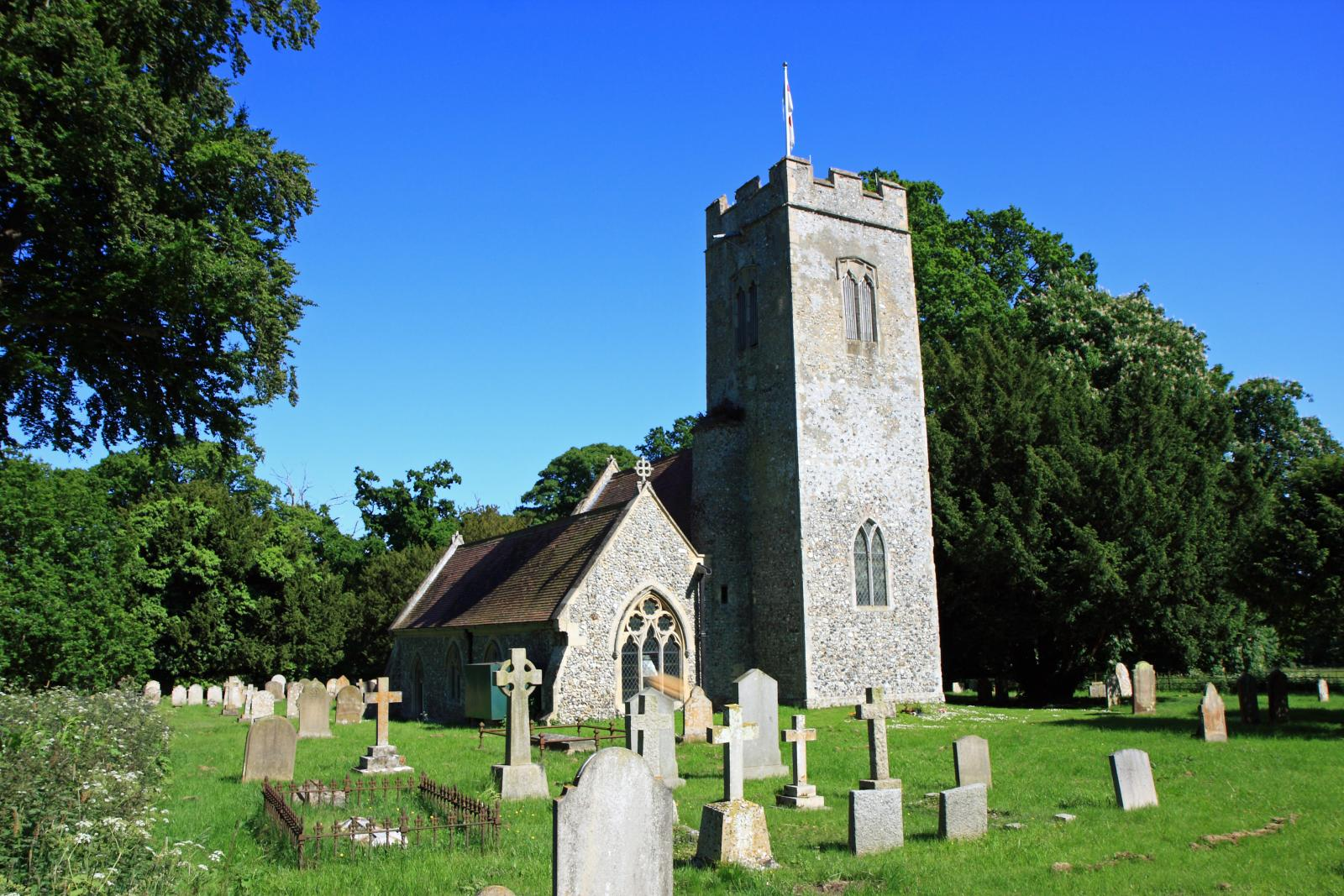
- St Mary’s Church, Marlingford

- Location within Norfolk
- OS grid reference: TG131470
- Civil parish: Marlingford and Colton
- District: South Norfolk
- Shire county: Norfolk
- Region: East
- Country: England
- Sovereign state: United Kingdom
- Post town: NORWICH
- Postcode district: NR9
- Dialling code: 01603
- Police: Norfolk
- Fire: Norfolk
- Ambulance: East of England

Marlingford is a village in the civil parish of Marlingford and Colton, in the South Norfolk district, in the county of Norfolk, England. It is 6 miles (9.7 km) west of Norwich.

== Features ==
Marlingford has a church called St Mary, and a pub called The Marlingford Bell on Bawburgh Road.

== History ==
The name "Marlingford" is uncertain but may mean 'ford of Mearthel's people' or 'ford at Marthing'. Marlingford was recorded in the Domesday Book of 1086 as Marthingheforda and Merlingeforda. On 25 March 1885 part of Easton parish was transferred to Marlingford. On 1 April 1935 the parish of Colton was merged with Marlingford. In 2001 the new parish was renamed "Marlingford and Colton". In 1931 the parish of Marlingford (prior to the marge) had a population of 181.
