= Shereford =

Village in Norfolk, England

Coordinates: 52.83173°N 0.80117°E

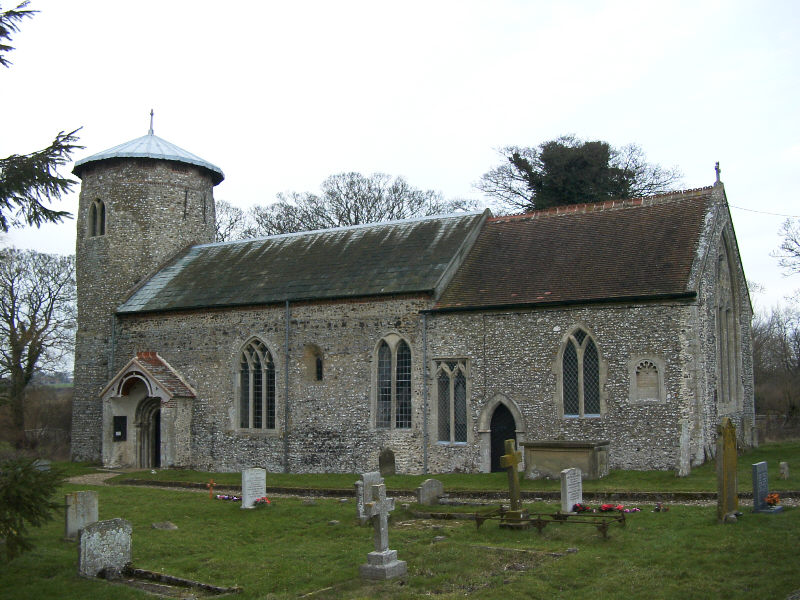
- Shereford St. Nicholas

- Location within Norfolk
- OS grid reference: TF888297
- Civil parish: Dunton
- District: North Norfolk
- Shire county: Norfolk
- Region: East
- Country: England
- Sovereign state: United Kingdom
- Post town: Fakenham
- Postcode district: NR21

Shereford is a small village and former civil parish, now in the parish of Dunton, in the North Norfolk district, in the county of Norfolk, England. It is located about 4 kilometres (2 mi) west of the market town of Fakenham. It lies on the east bank of the River Wensum facing Dunton across the river. In 1931 the parish had a population of 97. On 1 April 1935 the parish was abolished to form Dunton.

The villages name means 'Bright/clear ford'.

Shereford St. Nicholas is one of 124 existing round-tower churches in Norfolk.
