= Stonebridge, Norfolk =

Village in Norfolk, England

Coordinates: 52.47929°N 0.83616°E

Stonebridge
- Location within Norfolk
- OS grid reference: TL 927 906
- Civil parish: Wretham
- District: Breckland
- Shire county: Norfolk
- Region: East
- Country: England
- Sovereign state: United Kingdom
- Post town: Thetford
- Postcode district: IP24

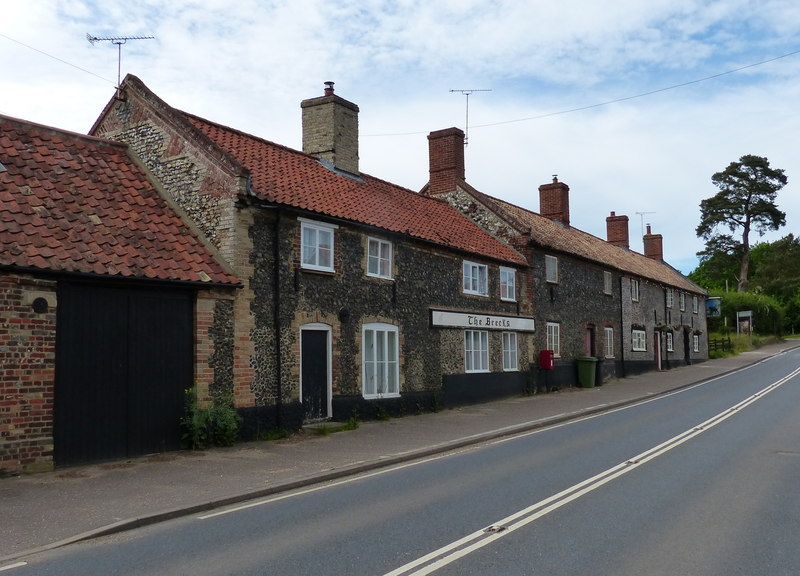
A neighborhood in Stonebridge.

Stonebridge is a village in the English county of Norfolk. It is situated on the A1075 road, some 6 miles (9.7 km) north east of the town of Thetford and 25 miles (40 km) south west of the city of Norwich. The village forms part of the civil parish of Wretham, which in turn falls within the district of Breckland.
