= Trimingham =

Village in Norfolk, England

Coordinates: 52.897°N 01.387°E

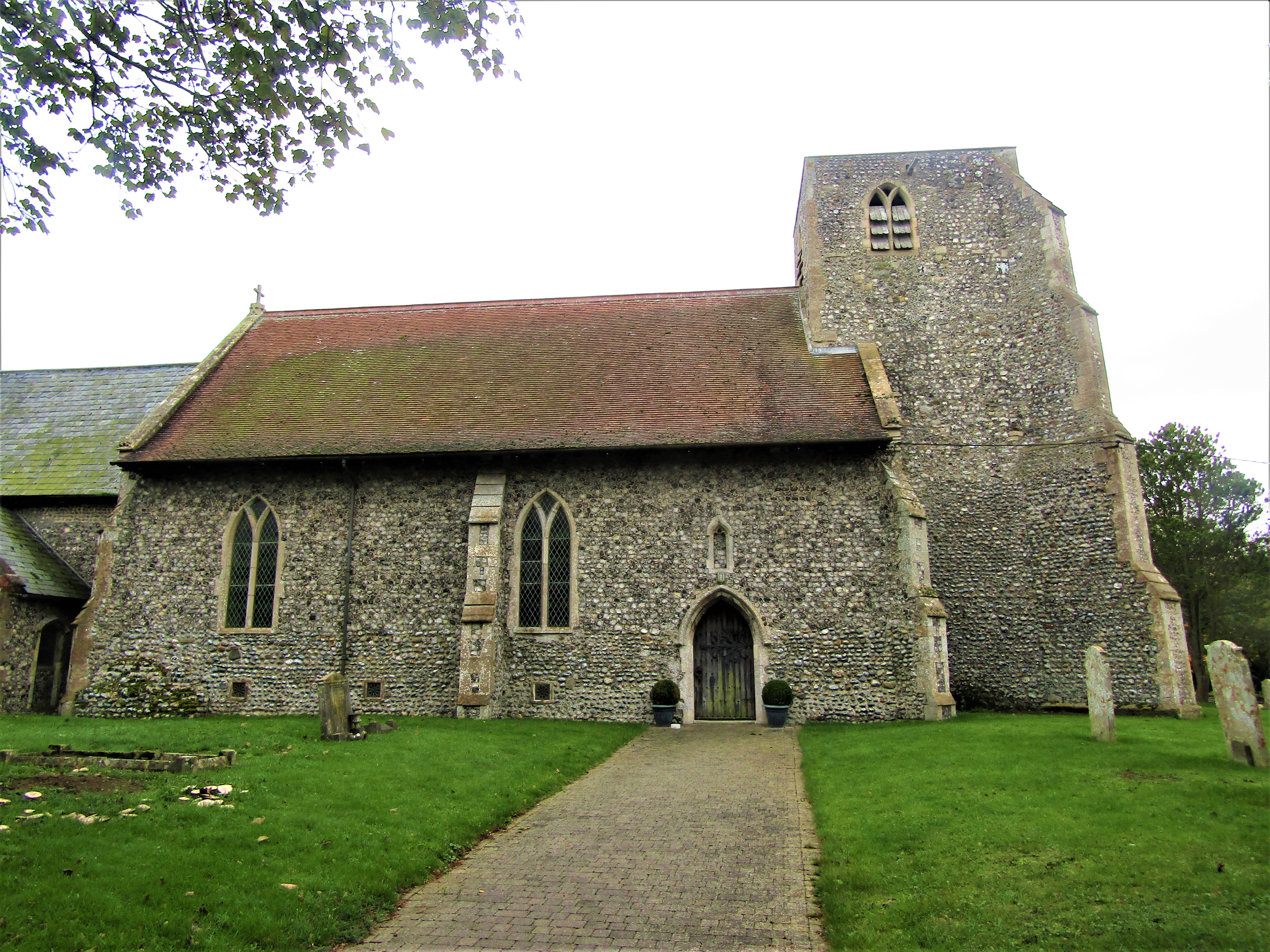
- Church of Saint John the Baptists' Head

- Location within Norfolk
- Area: 2.33 km^{2} (0.90 sq mi)
- Population: 485 (Including Sidestrand parish, 2011 census)
  - Density: 208/km^{2} (540/sq mi)
- OS grid reference: TG275387
  - London: 139 miles (224 km)
- Civil parish: Trimingham
- District: North Norfolk
- Shire county: Norfolk
- Region: East
- Country: England
- Sovereign state: United Kingdom
- Post town: Norwich
- Postcode district: NR11
- Police: Norfolk
- Fire: Norfolk
- Ambulance: East of England
- UK Parliament: North Norfolk

Trimingham is a coastal village and a civil parish in the North Norfolk district of Norfolk, England. The village is 5 miles (8 km) north of North Walsham, 4 miles (6 km) east of Cromer, 20 miles (32 km) north of the city and county town of Norwich, and is on the B1159 coastal road between Cromer and Mundesley.

The villages name means 'Homestead/village of Trymma's people'.

== Parish church ==
Trimingham parish church is named for St John the Baptist's Head. It is a Grade II* listed building.

The dedication dates to the medieval period, when a life-size alabaster head of the saint was kept at the church. St John's shrine altar was visited by pilgrims who came to the church rather than make the journey to Amiens Cathedral in northern France, where a relic, said to be the real head of John the Baptist, was kept. The alabaster head did not survive, and although it is unknown exactly what happened to it, it has been suggested that it was probably destroyed by Anglican reformers as a result of the 1538 injunctions against images during the reign of King Henry VIII. Another theory is that the head was destroyed as a result of a further injunction which was rigorously imposed in 1547, during the early weeks of the reign of Edward VI. Today an alabaster head survives in the Victoria and Albert Museum in London, and it is thought that the head at Trimingham was exactly the same. The village hall is called 'pilgrim shelter' as a reminder of Trimingham's past as a site of pilgrimage.

The church has a squat tower which is thought to be unfinished. It has heavy buttresses on the west elevation which suggest that a fault in the construction of the church may well have been the reason for the unfinished tower. The nave to the east cuts around the buttress to embrace it. This peculiarity may be partly the result of a restoration by Thomas Jeckyll in the 1850s. Pevsner states in his county survey book that Jeckyll completely rebuilt the nave, of which the most notable feature is the way that the tower buttresses on the east side project into the nave. The church's rood screen has four figures on either side of the entrance to the chancel: St Edmund with his arrow, St Clare with her book and monstrance, St Clement with his anchor and crozier, and St James in his pilgrim's robes. On the south side are St Petronella with her book and keys, St Cecilia with her garland of flowers, St Barbara with her tower, and St Jerome with his hawk. The east window of the church is credited to H Wilkinson and dates from 1925; the window depicts Christ in Majesty flanked by St Michael and St Gabriel, with the symbols of the four Evangelists surrounding them.

== Trimingham "golf ball" ==
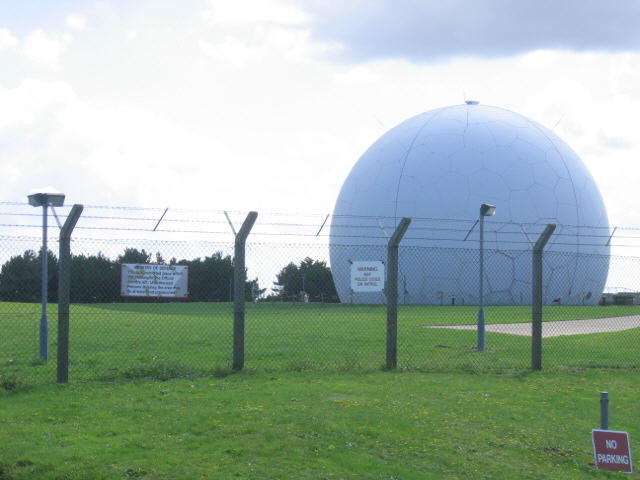
RAF Trimingham

Trimingham Beach

At Trimingham was an air defence radar station RAF Trimingham, a satellite station of RAF Neatishead inland, which had a structure shaped like a giant golf ball and was on the edge of the cliff on the coastal road.This structure was removed in early 2023. Having previously denied problems, the Ministry of Defence said, in November 2006, that it would consider claims for compensation after an inquiry found the Type 93 radar spinning inside the dome was "out of alignment". The MoD stated that the radar had been out of alignment between November 2005 and February 2006, causing car engines and lights to cut out, and speedometer dials to swing up to 150 mph as motorists drove past. A local garage owner who ran the nearest garage at Mundesley, said he had dealt with 30 calls over a couple of months.

== Trimingham beach ==
Trimingham has a beach that is used by surfers, jet skiers, dog walkers and night-fishermen. It is reached by a steep one-vehicle only road accessed along a lane just past the building that used to be the Ingleside public house, now a private residence.

The cliff face at Trimingham has the youngest chalk in the United Kingdom; it contains shells, bivalves, crinoids and oysters, and is subject to coastal erosion.

A now derelict tramway was built on the beach some time between 1945 and 1973. Its exact use is unclear, but it was probably used for bomb disposal after World War 2 and was used to construct the 1973 sea defences on the beach. It was partly buried later that year by a landslide from the nearby cliff.

== Transport ==
The nearest railway station is at Gunton for the Bittern Line which runs between Sheringham, Cromer and Norwich. The nearest airport is at Norwich International Airport.

Trimingham was once served by Trimingham railway station on the Norfolk and Suffolk Joint Railway between Cromer and North Walsham. It closed in 1953.

== Sport ==
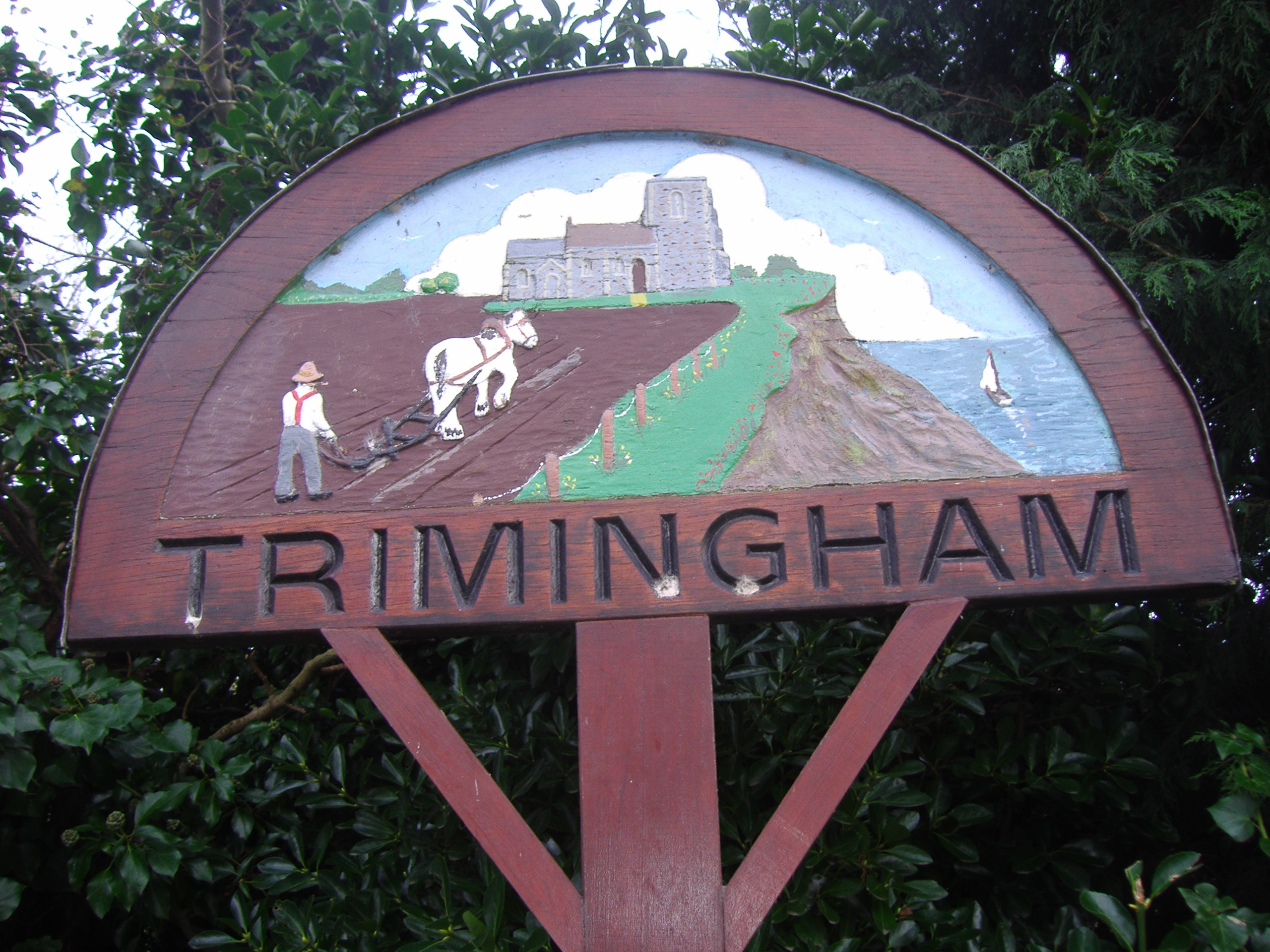
Village sign

The village has a football team called the Trimingham Pilgrims, also known as "The Trimms".
