= Colkirk =

Village in Norfolk, England

Coordinates: 52.80108°N 0.84223°E

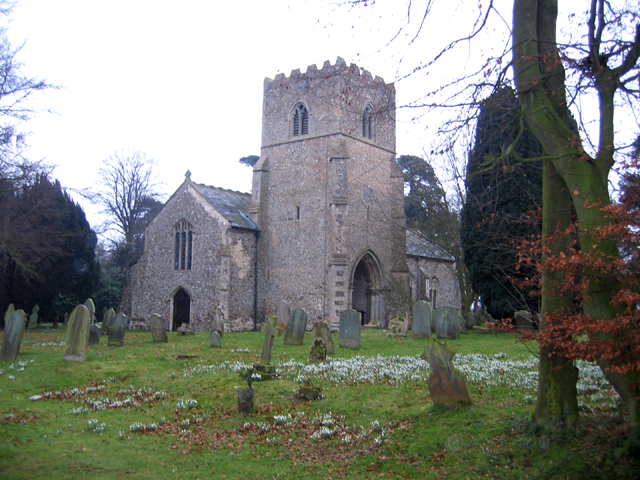
- St. Mary's Church

- Location within Norfolk
- Area: 10.60 km^{2} (4.09 sq mi)
- Population: 620 (2021 census)
  - Density: 58/km^{2} (150/sq mi)
- OS grid reference: TF917264
- Civil parish: Colkirk
- District: Breckland
- Shire county: Norfolk
- Region: East
- Country: England
- Sovereign state: United Kingdom
- Post town: Fakenham
- Postcode district: NR21
- Dialling code: 01328
- Police: Norfolk
- Fire: Norfolk
- Ambulance: East of England
- UK Parliament: Mid Norfolk
- Website: http://www.colkirk-norfolk.co.uk/

Colkirk (pronounced Col-kirk) is a village and civil parish in the English county of Norfolk.

Colkirk is located 2.3 miles (3.7 km) south of Fakenham and 22 miles (35 km) north-west of Norwich.

Amenities with the village include a Village Hall, a church pond (known as the Church Pit in Norfolk dialect), a Camping Land (land once used for the game Camping, "camp" meaning battle in Old English). There is also a village school for students from the age of four to eleven, a village pub called "The Crown" and a playing field for football, cricket, rounders and school sports days.

== History ==
Colkirk's name is of either Anglo-Saxon or Viking origin and derives from either the Old English for Cola's church or the Old Norse for Koli's church.

In the Domesday Book, Colkirk is recorded as a settlement of 28 households located in the hundred of Brothercross. In 1086, the village was part of the estates of William de Beaufeu.

Details of the original moated manor house and buildings, which included a dovecote and private chapel and was situated near Long's Lane off Dereham Road, were described in a document of 1296.

Soon after the cathedral was established in Norwich in 1101, the Bishop gave Colkirk to one of the knights of his private army. This knight named himself after the village "Richard of Colkirk" and he and his successors lived at the manor house until 600 years ago, after which the house within the moat was allowed to fall into decay.

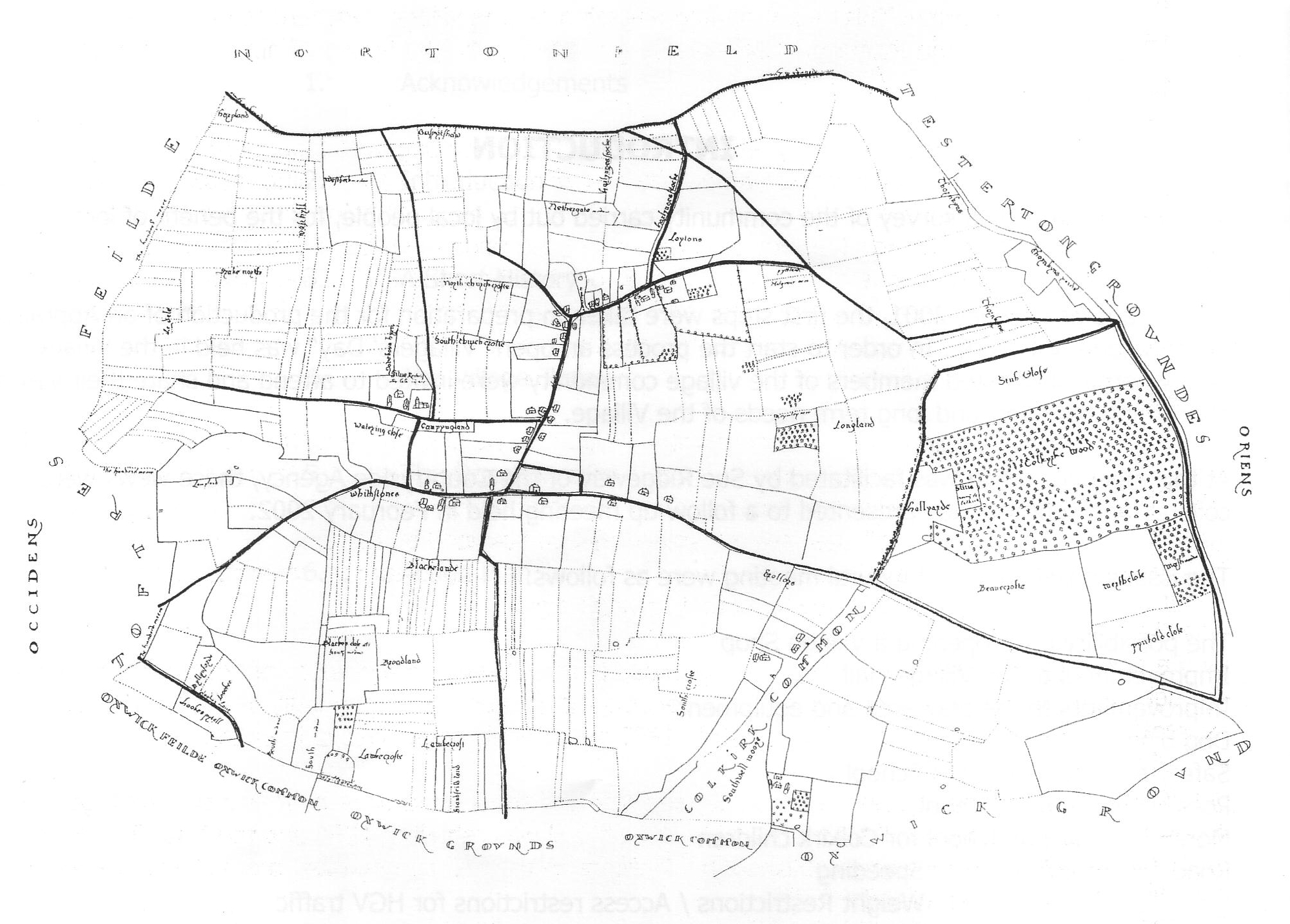
1617 Map of the Village of Colkirk

The Starre Pub in the 1920s

The Crown Pub in the 1920s. The pub is still open today.

About 400 years ago in the reign of Queen Elizabeth I, the village began to look more like the Colkirk of today. Brick and flint started to replace timber framed wattle and clay as building materials. Some of the earliest brick and flint houses remain today, "Starre" and "Gable End" being among the oldest houses in the village and Colkirk Hall was built towards the end of the reign of Queen Elizabeth I around 1595. The Timperley family were one of the first recorded occupants of the Hall. The Timperley family, after whom the Timperley Estate was named, fell on hard times and lost most of their land as a penalty for helping to defend King's Lynn against Oliver Cromwell's troops in 1643. Colkirk Hall was subsequently bought by Marquis Townshend, since when it has been occupied as a farm house.

Other changes were taking place in Colkirk at this time. One by one the small farmers who comprised the village population were becoming poor and sold their land to richer men. In this way there came to be just a few big farms in the village as there are today. With the formation of the big farms came the division of the old, big village fields into the smaller fields, bounded by hedges, which still exist today. All the land in the Parish was finally brought into use when the commons were enclosed and the big woods cut down about 150 years ago.

The period 1820 to 1845 saw a population increase in the village and a number of houses were built or rebuilt about this time. These houses can be recognised as they were generally of red brick, rather than flint. The "Crown" was rebuilt by the Parish in 1827 and Colkirk House was built in 1837.

Since then, most of the houses on the right hand side of School Road were built as model cottages by Canon Hoare, when he was Rector of Colkirk. The school was rebuilt in 1851 and the infants' room added in 1894. A Chapel was established in the village in the 1830s; however, the building erected in 1875 has now been demolished.

The Village Hall was built some 140 years ago by one of the Rectors of Colkirk and is now owned by the Parish.

Census population figures for the village show little change during the latter part of the 19th century and at around 450 are about 100 fewer than the present day.

== Geography ==
According to the 2021 census, Colkirk has a population of 620 people which shows an increase from the 588 people recorded in the 2011 census.

The village lies close to the source of the River Wensum which is between Colkirk, Oxwick and Whissonsett. The B1146, between Fakenham and Dereham, runs through the parish.

== St. Mary's Church ==
Colkirk's parish church is dedicated to Saint Mary and dates from the Fourteenth Century. St. Mary's is located on Church Road and has been Grade II listed since 1960.

St. Mary's was extended in the later Medieval period and was further extended in the Victorian era. The church boasts a Twelfth Century tub font and numerous examples of stained-glass windows designed by William Wailes and Ward and Hughes.

== Governance ==
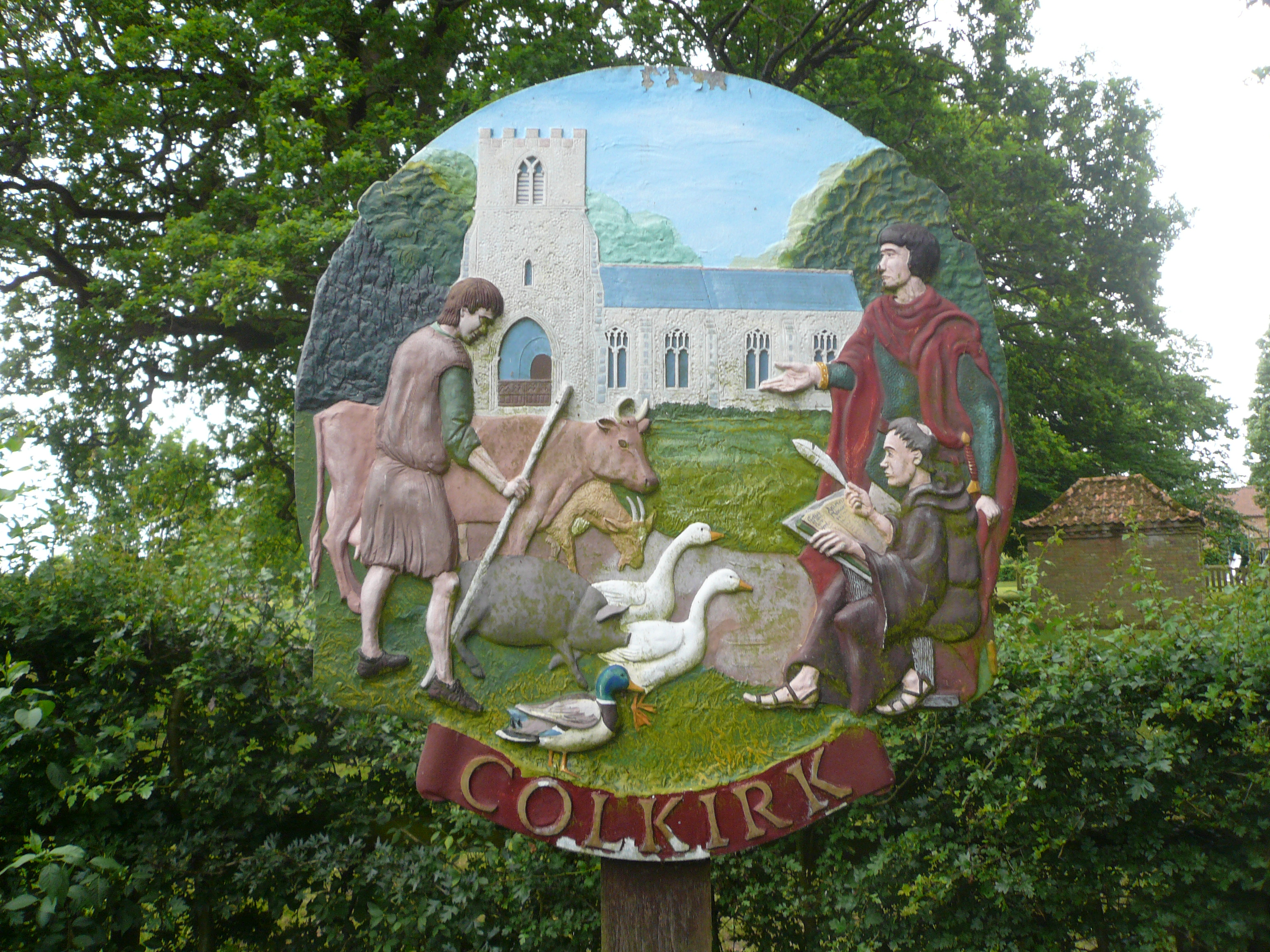
Colkirk village sign

Colkirk is part of the electoral ward of Hermitage for local elections and is part of the district of Breckland.

The village's national constituency is Mid Norfolk which has been represented by the Conservative's George Freeman MP since 2010.

== War memorial ==
Colkirk's war memorial was built in 1927, with fundraising efforts being spearheaded by a council of eight people most of whom were related to the fallen during the First World War. The war memorial is a stone plinth which has been further embellished with protective railings in the 21st century.
