= Friars Quay =

Residential development in Norwich, England

Coordinates: 52.6326°N 1.2958°E

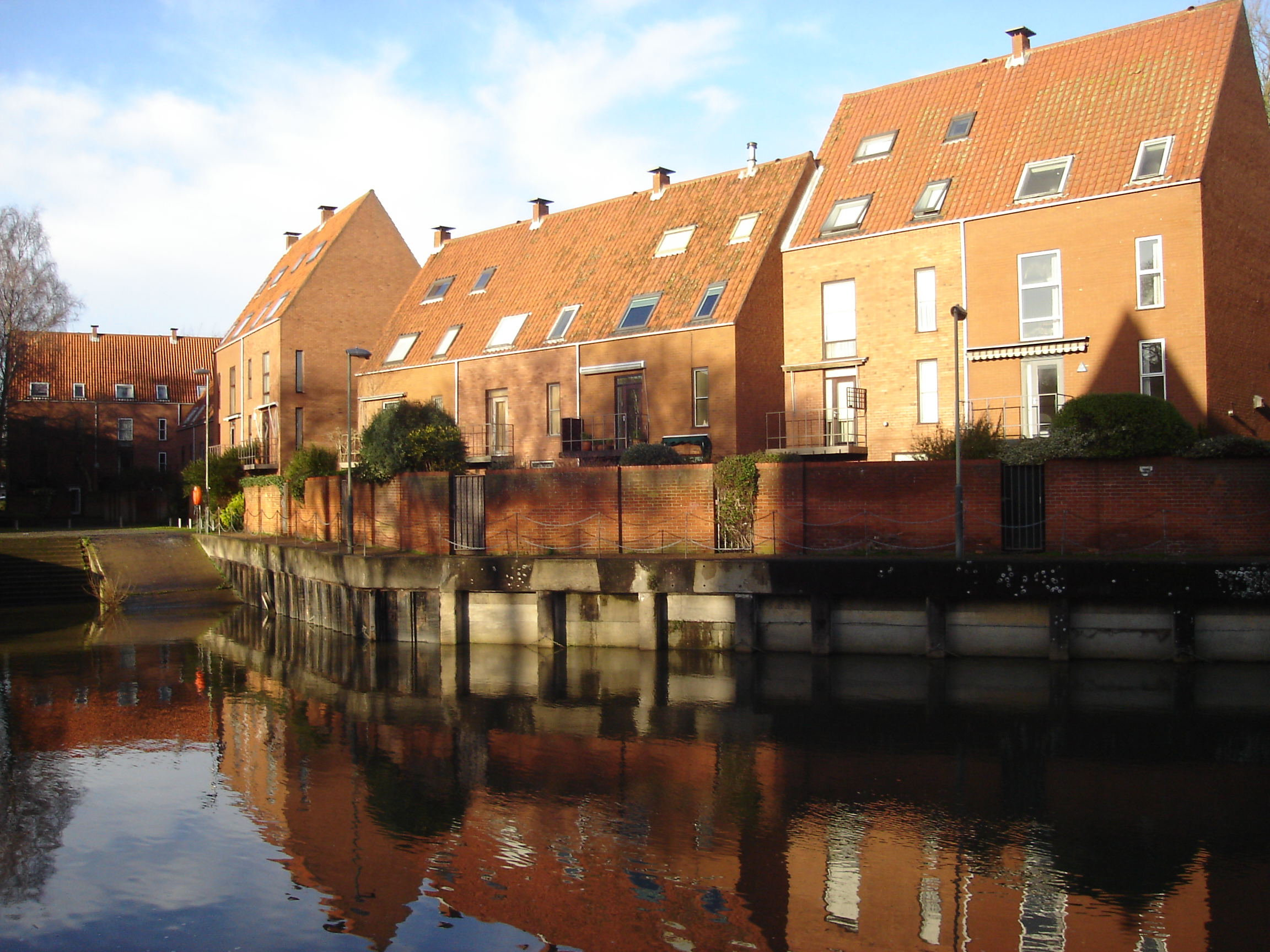
Friars Quay with the River Wensum in the foreground

Friars Quay is a residential development of a high density, urban design of the 1970s. The development is located in the Colegate area at the centre of Norwich, Norfolk, bounded on one side by the River Wensum and by a park and two notable bridges to the east and west. Several historic churches surround the site creating an attractive and varied landscape. The population is included in the Mancroft ward of Norwich City.

The original design consists of an arrangement of terraces that include a series of open spaces winding through the scheme culminating in a principal space facing water stairs and a ramp to the Wensum. Elevations are economical in conception with a richness in variety and spacing. There is simple paving and the use of rolled gravel in the surfaces to the highways and communal areas. The development was the subject of an article in the Architectural Review in 1975.

In recognition of the quality of the design Norwich City Council proposed in early 2004 to apply for Article 4 (2) Direction in order to reinforce the covenants that exist on the development. In April 2007 the City Council indicated that it would not proceed with Article 4 Direction but would instead place the development on its list of buildings of architectural importance. Friars Quay forms part of the City Centre Conservation area.

In the 1970s Norwich City Council was seeking ways to encourage people to live in the centre of historic Norwich. Friars Quay was built on the former Jewsons Timber Yard.

City of Norwich formed a partnership with local developer RG Carter Ltd., to redevelop this prominent city centre industrial site. The scheme consists of 40 four and five bedroom townhouses and 9 ground floor flats.

On 3 May 1972 planning permission was given for "the development of a builders' merchants premises by the construction of roads, footpaths and 24 parking spaces and the erection of forty houses (22 with integral garages) at Colegate". Included in the reasons for granting planning permission was "to protect and improve the amenity of the area, and ensure the maximum public use of the riverside".

The architect responsible for the design was David Luckhurst of Feilden & Mawson. Friars Quay has a very active Residents Association which has been involved in discussions regarding conservation.

== History ==
The history of the site must reflect the history of the River Wensum itself. The immediate history however relates to the use of the site as a timber yard until it was made available for development.

Jewsons Timber Yard was established by John Wilson Jewson who shipped in timbers by wherries from Great Yarmouth.

In 1868 George Jewson purchased a 17th-century house in Colegate which was used as the headquarters of the business. His son Richard (1867 to 1949) established Jewsons as the largest timber merchants between the Thames and the Humber. Richard became Lord Mayor of Norwich in 1917.

The land was purchased by Norwich City Council in 1970.
