= Oxwick =

Hamlet in Norfolk, England

Coordinates: 52.788°N 0.835°E

Oxwick is a hamlet in the English county of Norfolk. It lies close to the source of the River Wensum and lies one mile south of the village of Colkirk .

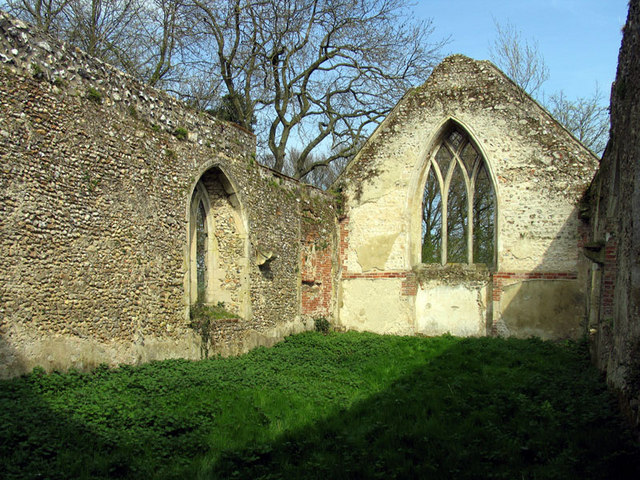
Ruined church in Oxwick Photographed in 2006

The hamlets name means 'Ox specialised farm'.
