= Besthorpe, Norfolk =

Village in Norfolk, England

Coordinates: 52.517°N 1.033°E

Besthorpe
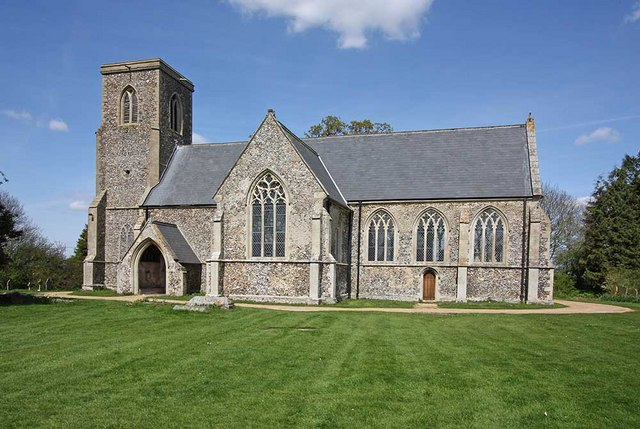
- All Saints Church, Besthorpe

- Location within Norfolk
- Area: 8.87 km^{2} (3.42 sq mi)
- Population: 561 (2001 census); 778 (2011)
  - Density: 63/km^{2} (160/sq mi)
- OS grid reference: TM058953
- Civil parish: Besthorpe, Norfolk
- District: Breckland
- Shire county: Norfolk
- Region: East
- Country: England
- Sovereign state: United Kingdom
- Post town: ATTLEBOROUGH
- Postcode district: NR17
- Dialling code: 01953
- Police: Norfolk
- Fire: Norfolk
- Ambulance: East of England

Besthorpe is a village and civil parish in the Breckland district of Norfolk, England, about 1 mile (1.6 km) east of Attleborough on the A11 road. According to the 2001 census it had a population of 561, increasing to 778 at the 2011 Census. The hamlet of Black Carr is within the civil parish.

The parish church is located in a remote part of the parish.
