= Upton, Norfolk =

Village in Norfolk, England

Coordinates: 52.658164°N 1.543149°E

Upton
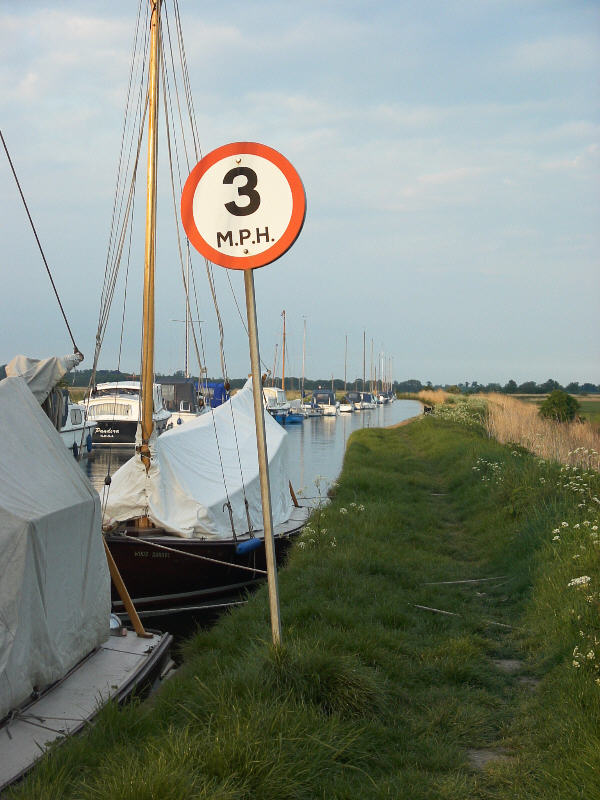
- Upton Dyke

- Location within Norfolk
- Population: 812
- Civil parish: Upton with Fishley
- District: Broadland
- Shire county: Norfolk
- Region: East
- Country: England
- Sovereign state: United Kingdom
- Post town: Norwich
- Postcode district: NR13
- UK Parliament: Broadland and Fakenham

Upton is a village on the River Bure in Norfolk, England within the Broads national park.

The villages name means 'higher farm/settlement'.

Administratively it comes under the civil parish of Upton with Fishley which in turn comes under the district of Broadland. It is 2 miles (3 km) north of Acle, halfway between Norwich and Great Yarmouth.

St. Margaret's Church is built in the Perpendicular style.

Upton Dyke, leading to the Bure, is 0.5 miles (0.8 km) long. At the end of the dyke, there is a rare hollow post mill, Palmer's Mill. The other windmill in the village is the Black Mill. Upton Boat Dyke Marshes is a Site of Special Scientific Interest in the care of Norfolk Wildlife Trust. Upton Broads and Marshes is a Special Area of Conservation (SAC).

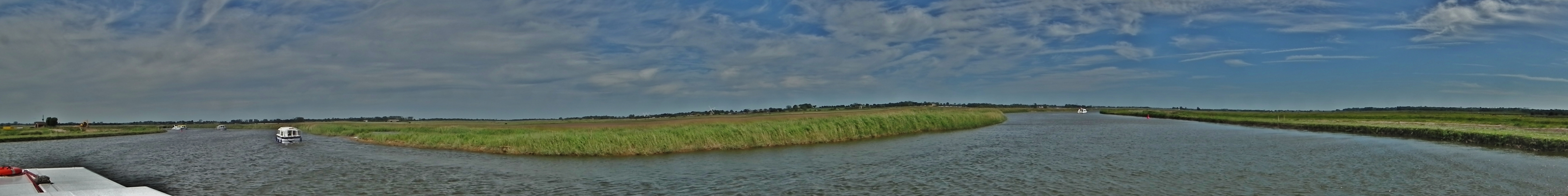
Panoramic view of the River Bure and marshes at the mouth of the Upton Dyke

Upton Fen, a nature reserve in the care of Norfolk Wildlife Trust, is nearby, also Upton Broad.
