= List of lost settlements in Norfolk =

There are believed to be around 200 lost settlements in Norfolk, England. This includes places which have been abandoned as settlements due to a range of reasons and at different dates. Types of lost settlement include deserted medieval villages (DMVs), relocated or "shrunken" villages, those lost to coastal erosion and other settlements known to have been "lost" or significantly reduced in size over the centuries, including those evacuated during World War II due to the creation of the Stanford Training Area. There are estimated to be as many as 3,000 deserted medieval villages in England.

== List of lost settlements ==
This list is of settlements which are known to have been lost and where the location can either be confirmed or is strongly suspected by the use of archaeological or documentary evidence. Settlements where there is less conclusive evidence as to their existence are recorded below this list. Grid references are given where known.

== A ==
Settlement name	Grid reference	Notes	Refs.
Alethorpe	TF948 313	Deserted medieval village mentioned in the Domesday Book. Abandoned in the 16th century, probably due to land being enclosed.	
Algarsthorpe	TG13 08 approx.	Deserted medieval village. The parish was united with Great Melton in 1476.	
Alvington	TG147 218	Possible site for Alvington deserted medieval village in Cawston parish.	
Anmer	TF737 294	Site of medieval village on the grounds of Anmer Hall. The village appeared in the Domesday Book and a detailed description of it in around 1600 exists.	
Appleton	TF705 274	Deserted medieval village mentioned in the Domesday Book in the modern parish of Flitcham with Appleton. The round tower of St Mary's church is still standing. See also Little Appleton.	
Apton	TM313 993	Site of village mentioned in the Domesday Book and the Nomina Villarum of 1316.	
Arminghall	TG253 048	Deserted medieval village in the parish of Bixley.	
Ashby	TG419 158	Village mentioned in Domesday and Nomina Villarum, with 91 tax payers recorded in 1381. Believed to have been abandoned in the 18th century.	
Ashby, Snetterton	Unknown	Village mentioned in the Domesday Book but not recorded in the Nomina Villarum of 1316. The precise site is disputed.	
Ashwicken	TF698 190	Shrunken medieval village mentioned in the Domesday Book. The parish was united with Leziate by the mid-15th century.	

== B ==
Settlement name	Grid reference	Notes	Refs.
Babingley	TF670 263	Deserted medieval village. Possibly the site at which St Felix of Burgundy landed in England in about 630.	
Baconsthorpe, near Attleborough	Unknown	Deserted village mentioned in the Domesday Book and known to be north of Attleborough.	
Barmer	TF813 336	Deserted medieval village site identified from air photography in 1991.	
Barningham Town	TG15 33	Site of Roman settlement.	
Barret Ringstead	See Ringstead Parva		
Barton Bendish	TF718 062	Site of a deserted medieval village with substantial earthworks remaining.	
Bawsey	TF663 207	Settlement site dating from the Roman to medieval periods with evidence of Bronze Age and Iron Age occupation. The site featured in an episode of the television programme Time Team. A medieval village at Bawsey is believed to have been abandoned by 1517.	
Bayfield	TG050 405	Deserted medieval village site. The church is ruined and was disused from the 17th century. The village site is now occupied mainly by Bayfield Hall.	
Beachamwell	TF752 054	Deserted medieval village of Wella.	
Beeston St Andrew	TG251 146	Possible site of deserted medieval village.	
Beeston St Lawrence	TG32 21	Possible site of deserted medieval village mentioned in the Domesday Book and Nomina Villarum. Possibly removed due to emparkment in the 1780s.	
Belhawe	Unknown	Deserted settlement within the old parish of Arminghall. The church was dedicated to St Andrew and is now within Bixley parish.	
Bickerston	TG086 087	Deserted medieval village mentioned in the Domesday Book and Nomina Villarum. There were 13 taxpayers in 1329 but just six by 1332. Probably finally abandoned in the 17th century.	
Bixley	TG257 040	Deserted medieval village with only the parish church, the only one in England dedicated to St Wandregesilius, remaining. Possible abandoned due to migration to the nearby city of Norwich.	
Boyland	TM222 943	Site of deserted medieval village and Boyland Hall.	
Bowthorpe	TG177 091	Deserted medieval village. The church was abandoned in the 16th century.	
Brampton	TG22 23	Site of a Roman town.	
Brancaster	TF78 43	The Romano-British vicus associated with the fort of Branodunum.	
Braydeston or Breydeston	TG341 088	Site of deserted medieval village mentioned in the Domesday Book and Nomina Villarum, with ten households listed in 1428.	
Brettenham	TL939 844	Site of a Roman town.	
Broomsthorpe	TF852 289	Deserted medieval village identified through a series of earthworks. May be the same place as Sengham or possibly the location of Tattersett St Andrew. Close to the site of Coxford Priory.	
Browston	TG499 017	Approximate location of deserted medieval village On the site of Browston Hall.	
Brumstead	TG370 265	Possible site of deserted medieval settlement.	
Buckenham Tofts	TL838 947	Also known as Buckingham Parva. Mentioned in the Domesday Book and Nomina Villarum. All traces of the medieval settlement were destroyed by the 19th century. The modern village and hall were evacuated by the remaining 73 residents in 1942 and became part of the Stanford Training Area. The area is still controlled for military training by the British Army.	
Burgh Castle	TG476 043	Site of the Roman vicus associated with the fort of Gariannonum. Was in Suffolk until boundary changes in 1974. The site may have later been the location of the Saxon monastery of Cnobheresburg, founded in around 630 by Saint Fursey.	
Burgh next Aylsham	TG218 251	Earthworks showing the prior extent of the shrunken village of Burgh next Aylsham.	
Burgh Parva	TG044 335	Deserted medieval village.	
Bylaugh	TG036 184	Possible site of deserted medieval village mentioned in the Domesday Book. The village was shrunken significantly by the 15th century and was probably abandoned soon afterwards.	

== C ==
Settlement name	Grid reference	Notes	Refs.
Caistor St Edmund	TG231 035	The site of the major regional Roman town of Venta Icenorum, the capital of the Iceni tribe.	
Caldecote	TF745 034	Deserted medieval village abandoned by the late 16th century. Mentioned in the Domesday Book.	
Calvelly	Unknown	Deserted village known to have existed within Garvestone parish.	
Cantley, Ketteringham	TG181 046	Deserted medieval village mentioned in the Domesday Book. Parish united with Hethersett in 1397. Also recorded as Cantelose.	
Carleton Forehoe	TG094 058	The remains of the shrunken medieval village of Carleton Forehoe.	
Choseley	TF755 408	Deserted medieval village with earthworks remaining.	
Clare	N/A	North of Cromer. Lost to coastal erosion and flooding in the 15th century.	
Clare, Crostwick	Unknown	Village mentioned in the Domesday Book and which may have been located in the modern parish of Crostwick.	
Cley St Peter	TF804 044	Deserted medieval village mentioned in the Domesday Book. The parish church burnt down in the 16th century and was never rebuilt.	
Clipstone	Unknown	Mentioned in the Domesday Book and as Clifton in 1316. By 1334 the village had become part of Kettlestone. The site of the medieval village is unknown.	
Colveston	TL794 955	Deserted medieval village. Depopulated by the early 18th century	
Cotes	TF85 07	Deserted medieval village referred to in 14th century documents and which survived into the 17th century. Petygards formed part of the larger village of Cotes.	
Cranwich	TL783 949	Deserted medieval village	
Custhorpe	TF78 14 approx.	Possible site of village mentioned in the Domesday Book. The village is known to be located within West Acre parish but the location is approximate.	

== D ==
Settlement name	Grid reference	Notes	Refs.
Denton	TF70 26	Deserted medieval settlement.	
Didlington	TL779 970	Village mentioned in the Domesday Book which declined in the 17th century as the Lord of the Manor bought up the majority of the arable land.	
Dunham	TF986 248	Site of deserted medieval village.	
Dunton	TF881 300	Deserted medieval village site close to Dunton church.	

== E ==
Settlement name	Grid reference	Notes	Refs.
Earlham	TG193 082	Mentioned in the Domesday Book and Nomina Villarum and depopulated in 1657 to make way for the development of Earlham Hall.	
Eaton, Sedgeford	TF699 362	Probable site of deserted medieval village.	
Eccles	TG414 288	Coastal flooding and erosion destroyed most of the village by around 1570, with only 14 houses remaining after a major flood event in January 1604 during which around 66 properties were lost. The church tower survived until 1895 when it was lost to the sea. The site is on the foreshore, with remains occasionally visible after storms or significant erosion events.	
Egmere	TF897 374	Deserted medieval village mentioned in the Domesday Book at which point it was a relatively large settlement. By 1428 it had fewer than 10 inhabitants and was joined with Quarles. It seems to have been abandoned by the mid-16th century. The church tower of St Edmund's Church still stands.	
Erwellestun	Unknown	Deserted medieval village probably located in the north of the parish of Kirby Cane near Hales Hall.	

== F ==
Settlement name	Grid reference	Notes	Refs.
Felbrigg	TG197 390	Village moved from the grounds of Felbrigg Hall	
Foston or Fodderston	TF652 094	Deserted medieval village which had 15 taxpayers in 1329 and had been reduced to three cottages by 1805. The church was demolished in the 16th century.	
Foulness	N/A	North of Mundesley. Lost to coastal erosion in the 15th century.	
Frenze	TM135 804	Deserted village mentioned in the Domesday Book and Nomina Villarum. St Andrew's Church is one of the few remaining buildings.	

== G ==
Settlement name	Grid reference	Notes	Refs.
Gasthorpe	TL983 813	Village mentioned in the Domesday Book and abandoned in the 17th century	
Gatton	TF70 26	Mentioned in documents from the 13th to 16th century. Not in Domesday Book. Roman and late Saxon archaeological finds have been found.	
Gayton	TF719 195	Site of medieval manor and village.	
Glorestorp	TF695 182	Deserted medieval village mentioned in the Domesday Book. In the 14th century the village is recorded as having a manor house and two watermills.	
Godwick	TF903 220	Deserted medieval village mentioned in the Domesday Book. The site is well preserved as it has never been deep ploughed. Abandoned in the 16th century, possibly due to very heavy clay soils hindering agricultural development.	
Golosa	See Ingloss		
Great Barwick	TF807 351	Probable site of deserted medieval village mentioned in Domesday and Nomina Villarum.	
Great Palgrave	TF834 120	Deserted medieval village mentioned in the Domesday Book. Survived until the 15th century.	
Great Snarehill	TL893 835	Deserted medieval village dating from the late Saxon period. See also Little Snarehill.	
Grenesvil	TM23 99	Possible site of hamlet mentioned in the Domesday Book. Within the modern parish of Shotesham.	
Grenstein	TF907 198	Also known as Gramston or Greynston. Deserted medieval village abandoned in the 16th century.	
Grimston	TF71 21	Site of deserted medieval village.	
Gunton, Hanworth	TG230 340	Deserted medieval village replaced by Gunton Hall.	
Guton	Unknown	Deserted medieval village which was a relatively large settlement at the Domesday Book. Granted a Market by the Crown in 1287. Site marked by Guton Hall in the modern parish of Brandiston.	

== H ==
Settlement name	Grid reference	Notes	Refs.
Hales	TM380 960	A variety of medieval settlement sites exist within Hales, including at Hales Green. Iron Age and Roman settlement sites have also been located.	
Harling Thorpe	TL946 842	Deserted medieval village.	
Hargham	TM020 914	Deserted medieval village mentioned in the Domesday Book.	
Heckingham	TM385 988	A variety of settlement sites, including from the Roman and medieval periods.	
Herringby	TG446 103	Deserted medieval village mentioned in the Domesday Book and Nomina Villarum. Parish was united with Stokesby in around 1580 and the church demolished in 1610.	
Hethel	TG172 004	Possible site of the village of Hethel, the church of which was mentioned in the Domesday Book.	
Hockwold	TL723 877	Area of abandoned medieval settlement on the edge of the shrunken village of Hockwold.	
Holkham	TF882 430	Removed in the 18th century as part of the development of Holkham Hall.	
Holme	TF909 069	Site of deserted medieval village.	
Holt, near Leziate	TF675 184	Land enclosed by landlord Thomas Thursby for use as sheep pasture. Totally depopulated by 1517 – the only Norfolk village to be found to have been depopulated by enclosure at the time of Wolsey's Commission of Inquiry of that year.	
Holverston	TG307 031	The parish is recorded in the Domesday Book. The church was demolished in the medieval period.	
Houghton	TF794 285	Recorded in the Domesday Book and Nomina Villarum. Village was removed to make way for the building of Houghton Hall in the 1730s, although it may have already been partly abandoned.	
Houghton-on-the-Hill	TF868 053	Deserted medieval village mentioned in the Domesday Book and Nomina Villarum. In the 18th century it contained more than 32 houses but had been reduced to a handful of buildings by 1805. The church was last used in 1944 before being rediscovered in the 1990s and restored. It contains a series of late Saxon wall paintings.	

== I ==
Settlement name	Grid reference	Notes	Refs.
Illington	TL946 901	A shrunken village mentioned in the Domesday Book.	
Ingloss	TM345 967	Site of deserted medieval village named as Golosa in the Domesday Book.	
Irmingland, Oulton	TG123 294	Deserted medieval village mentioned in the Domesday Book and Nomina Villarum. The village had a population of 21 in 1352 and had 10 householders by 1428. The church was ruined in 1602, having been in use in 1557, and by 1805 only two or three houses remained in the settlement.	

== J ==
Settlement name	Grid reference	Notes	Refs.
Jerpestun	Unknown	Village mentioned in the Domesday Book and other medieval documents. Located close to Loddon and Hales.	

== K ==
Settlement name	Grid reference	Notes	Refs.
Kempstone	TF886 160	Deserted medieval settlement site mentioned in Domesday Book and Nomina Villarum. A small Roman town or village is believed to have existed at TF87 16	
Kenningham	TM206 999	Deserted medieval village. The parish was united with Mulbarton in 1452 by which time there were only a handful of residents remaining.	
Kettleton	Unknown	Village mentioned in the Domesday Book. Is thought to have been located in the parish of Forncett.	
Keswick	Near Bacton	Lost to coastal erosion.	
Kilverstone	TL894 841	Village mentioned in the Domesday Book which was largely abandoned by the 18th century at which point the remains were emparked as part of the development of Kilverstone Hall	
Kilverstone Heath	TL90 86	A temporary settlement for railway workers was created on the site in the 1840s.	
Kimberley	TG06 04	Extensive area medieval earthworks showing the former size of the village of Kimberley.	
Kipton	Unknown	Mentioned in the Domesday Book. Known to be within the parish of Weasenham St Peter.	

== L ==
Settlement name	Grid reference	Notes	Refs.
Langford	TL839 965	Deserted medieval village site abandoned by the mid 18th century. The modern village was abandoned by the remaining 37 residents in 1942 when the Stanford Training Area was established.	
Langhale	TM30 97	Village mentioned in the Domesday Book. Probably a dispersed settlement with the parish church in ruins by the early 16th century.	
Letha	Unknown	Village site mentioned in Domesday. Somewhere in the Hundred of Blofield.	
Letton	TF974 057	Deserted medieval village mentioned in the Domesday Book. Abandoned by the 16th century.	
Leziate	TF695 199	Shrunken medieval village mentioned in the Domesday Book and which was joined with the parish of Ashwicken in the late 15th century.	
Little Appleton	TF710 210	Deserted medieval village abandoned before the 17th century when a farmstead is recorded.	
Little Barwick	See Middleton		
Little Bittering	TF935 175	Deserted medieval village recorded in the Domesday Book and visible as earthworks. St Peter and St Paul's Church dates from the 12th century. The parish was united with Beeston in the 20th century.	
Little Breckles, Shropham	TL968 937	Site of a deserted medieval settlement, probably abandoned by the early 14th century.	
Little Breckles, Stow Bedon	TL960 944	Mentioned as a separate town in Domesday. The church was demolished in the 14th century and the settlement abandoned by 1547. The site may be that of Great Breckles.	
Little Hockham	TL949 910	Village mentioned in the Domesday Book which declined in the 16th century.	
Little Palgrave	TF832 135	Site of deserted medieval village at Palgrave Hall.	
Little Snarehill	TL889 805	Deserted medieval village mentioned in the Domesday Book. See also Great Snarehill.	
Little Wacton	TM180 902	Possible site of deserted medieval village	
Little Waxham	See Waxham Parva		
Little Witchingham	TG117 204	Parish mentioned in the Domesday Book. The church became redundant by the 1930s but has now been restored.	
Little Wreningham	TM155 980	Thought to be the site of a deserted medieval village.	
Little Wrethham	Unknown	Village was mentioned in the Domesday Book. The exact site is unknown. Probably abandoned by the late 14th century.	
Lynford	TL820 941	Recorded as having between nine and 16 taxpayers between 1316 and 1428, was uninhabited by 1467. Now the site of Lynford Hall.	

== M ==
Settlement name	Grid reference	Notes	Refs.
Maidenhouse	TF597 199	Deserted medieval village and port on the outskirts of the modern village of Clenchwarton	
Maideston	TG248 216	Possible site of deserted medieval village.	
Mannington	TG144 320	Deserted medieval village in decline by the time Mannington Hall was built on the site in 1460. Village had disappeared by 1565	
Markshall	TG228 047	Deserted medieval village. The church was mentioned in the Domesday Book.	
Matlask	TG152 349	Shrunken village.	
Middle Harling	TL980 851	Site occupied from the late Saxon to medieval period with documentary evidence of occupation until the 17th century.	
Middleton	TF803 359	Probable site of deserted medieval village abandoned by the early 15th century. Also known as Little Barwick.	
Mintlyn	TF657 192	Mentioned in the Domesday Book and Nomina Villarum and deserted in the post-medieval period	
Mora	Unknown	Deserted village site mentioned in the Domesday Book in the parish of Freethorpe.	
Morley St Peter	TF065 984	Probable site of deserted settlement near St Peter's Church, Morley.	

== N ==
Settlement name	Grid reference	Notes	Refs.
Narford	TF76 13	Possible site of a deserted medieval village mentioned in the Domesday Book. On the site of a Roman settlement with significant number of Roman archaeological finds. Over 100 houses were present in the mid 15th century but only two remained by 1802. The precise location is undisclosed.	
Narvestuna	Unknown	Village mentioned in Domesday in Clavering hundred.	
Nelonde	Unknown	Deserted medieval settlement thought to be located in the parish of Wreningham. The church was dedicated to St Peter and the parish was united with Great Wreningham by 1414.	
Ness	Unknown	East of Winterton-on-Sea or in Mautby parish. Village mentioned in the Domesday Book. It was either lost to coastal erosion, possibly in the 17th or 18th century, or occupied a site in the parish of Mautby.	
Newton	East of Gorleston	Village lost to coastal erosion some time after 1567. The site would have been part of Suffolk until the county boundary was changed in 1974.	
North Barsham	TF917 349	Probably site of deserted medieval village.	
North Lynn	TF613 211	Deserted settlement to the north of Kings Lynn originally on the edge of The Wash. The church was washed away in 1271. Land reclamation means that the site is now on the banks of the River Great Ouse and is now a chemical works.	
Norton	See Stoke-cum-Norton		

== O ==
Settlement name	Grid reference	Notes	Refs.
Oby	TG415 144	Deserted medieval village mentioned in the Domesday Book and Nomina Villarum.	
Old Fulmodeston	TF996 302	Site of medieval village to the south of present settlement. Located by pottery scatters from 11th to 13th century.	
Otterynghythe	TL80 87	Possible site of a deserted medieval village.	

== P ==
Settlement name	Grid reference	Notes	Refs.
Panworth	TF896 048	Mentioned in the Domesday Book but did not appear on a map of 1581.	
Pattesley	TF899 241	Deserted medieval village mentioned in the Domesday Book. The church was in ruins and abandoned by 1602.	
Pensthorpe, Kettlestone	TF947 290	Site of deserted medieval village. Largely destroyed by gravel extraction.	
Petygards	See Cotes		
Pockthorpe	TG128 063	Deserted medieval settlement site.	
Pudding Norton	TF924 277	Deserted medieval village cleared to make way for grazing in the late 16th or early 17th century. The ruins of St Margaret's Church remain south of the mid-17th century Pudding Norton Hall.	

== Q ==
Settlement name	Grid reference	Notes	Refs.
Quarles	TF884 385	Village mentioned in the Domesday Book. Was joined with Egmere for taxation purposes by the 15th century. The church was ruined by 1571 and the village abandoned by 1713.	

== R ==
Settlement name	Grid reference	Notes	Refs.
Rackheath	TG278 152	Site of deserted settlement which later moved further south to site of the current village.	
Rainthorpe	TM202 972	Possible site of village recorded in the Domesday Book.	
Reston	Unknown	Lost settlement somewhere in the Gorleston area. Would have been part of Suffolk prior to boundary changes in 1835.	
Ringstead Parva	TF684 399	Also referred to as Barrett Ringstead. Deserted medieval village.	
Ristuna	TF622 017	Deserted medieval village abandoned by the 18th century. Mentioned in the Domesday Book and Nomina Villarum.	
Roudham	TL956 872	Described as the "best and most extensive example" of a deserted medieval village in Norfolk. A scheduled monument.	
Rougham	TF825 207	Deserted village occupied between the 11th and 15th centuries.	
Roxham	TL638 997	Village deserted by the 16th century.	
Ryston	See Ristuna		

== S ==
Settlement name	Grid reference	Notes	Refs.
Santon	TL828 873	Deserted medieval village site.	
Saxlingham Thorpe	TM230 966	The parish church was ruined by 1687 as villagers moved to more effective agricultural sites.	
Semer	Unknown	Village mentioned in the Domesday Book and in land grants dating from the 13th century. The site is unknown but is likely to be in either the parish of Dickleburgh and Rushall or Pulham St Mary.	
Shipden	North-east of Cromer	Village mentioned in the Domesday Book (Cromer was not) with a population of over 100. Lost to coastal erosion by about 1400, with the first losses to the churchyard recorded in 1336. The site of the church tower was the probable cause of the sinking of the steam tug Victoria in 1888.	
Shotford	TM251 821	Site of small medieval settlement.	
Shotesham St Mary	TM238 988	Deserted medieval village. Shotesham was detailed as four parishes in the Domesday Book.	
Shouldham	TF680 089	Site of deserted medieval village on the eastern edge of the modern village.	
Snore	TL624 993	Possible site of village of Snore, mentioned in the Domesday Book	
Southgate or Sythgate	TG137 245	Possible site of deserted medieval village	
Southmere or Summerfield	TF748 385	Deserted medieval village.	
Southwood	TG393 053	Possible site of deserted medieval village	
Sparham	TF874 111	Earthworks identified as a deserted medieval village. Also known as Pinkneys.	
Stanford	TL855 946	Village mentioned in the Domesday Book with earthworks remaining. The modern settlement was abandoned in 1942 when the Stanford Training Area was established with the removal of the remaining 110 inhabitants. The area remains a British Army training area with no permanent population.	
Stanninghall	TG255 175	Deserted medieval village, the only remains of which are the ruined church tower.	
Stinton	TG118 255	Deserted settlement mentioned in the Domesday Book in the parish of Salle.	
Stoke-cum-Norton	Unknown	Settlement is referred to in documents but the location is unknown.	
Sturston	TL875 950	Medieval village listed in the Domesday Book and Nomina Villarum. Lost to enclosure of common land in 1597. Now part of the Stanford Military Training Area established in 1942 when 27 people were evacuated.	
Sutton	TF895 206	Mentioned in the Domesday Book and deserted by the post medieval period	
Swathing	TF986 058	Deserted medieval settlement mentioned in the Domesday Book.	

== TUV ==
Settlement name	Grid reference	Notes	Refs.
Tattersett St Andrew	See Broomsthorpe		
Testerton	TF934 267	Deserted village which declined from the 17th century. Parish was abolished in 1935 and combined with Pudding Norton.	
Thorpe Parva	TM161 794	Mentioned in the Domesday Book, the parish was united with Scole in 1482 and the church demolished in around 1540, with the tower remaining as a dovecote. One family lived in the village by 1739.	
Thorpland, Runcton Holme	TF616 083	Deserted medieval village. Archaeological remains discovered during gravel extraction in 1964.	
Thorpland, Fakenham	TF937 322	Site of a deserted medieval village mentioned in the Domesday Book.	
Threxton	TF885 001	Mentioned in the Domesday Book and Nomina Villarum, with 28 taxpayers in 1329 and 23 in 1377. Depopulated by 1635.	
Thurton	TG100 214	Possible site of village mentioned in the Domesday Book and which was later known as Middleton-in-Witchingham.	
Thuxton	TG035 075	Deserted village probably occupied between the 13th and 15th centuries. Heavy clay soils may have led to abandonment. Possibly also known as Thurmanston.	
Tofts	Unknown	Deserted medieval settlement mentioned in the Domesday Book. Combined with Great Ellingham for taxation purposes in the late 14th century.	
Toimere	TF655 066	Deserted settlement mentioned in the Domesday Book.	
Tottington	TL893 955	Site of a deserted medieval village. The modern village, which had 200 residents, was abandoned in 1942 when the Stanford Training Area was established.	
Twanton	TM175 929	Possible site of deserted medieval village mentioned in the Domesday Book. Also known as Tharanton.	
Venta Icenorum	See Caistor St Edmund		

== W ==
Settlement name	Grid reference	Notes	Refs.
Wallington	TF626 076	Medieval village mentioned in the Domesday Book and Nomina Villarum. Possibly removed to construct Wallington Hall in the 16th century.	
Walsingham, East Carleton	Unknown	Settlement mentioned in the Domesday Book and other documents as early as 1046.	
Washingford	TM334 992	Site of deserted medieval village mentioned in the Domesday Book.	
Waterden	TF887 364	Deserted medieval village. Mentioned in the Domesday Book and Nomina Villarum. Land lost to agricultural enclosure from the 17th century was a reason for abandonment.	
Waxham Parva	Near Waxham	Lost to coastal erosion. Church records end suddenly in 1383 so the loss of the village can probably be dated to around this time.	
Wendling	TF929 122	Site of deserted medieval village.	
West Harling	TL975 852	Deserted medieval village mentioned in the Domesday book. Occupied until the 17th century.	
West Lexham	TF843 171	Marked on a map of 1575 but mostly abandoned by 1771.	
West Tofts	TL837 928	Deserted medieval village cleared to make way for the development of Lynford Hall park in the 17th century. The modern village and hall were evacuated in 1942 and became part of the Stanford Training Area. The population of 135 was rehoused. The hall was demolished after 1945 and the area is still controlled for military training by the British Army, although the parish church still stands and is used at Christmas for a carol service.	
Wighton	TF95 39	A range of Iron Age and Roman settlement sites, including a substantial Roman town and two Iron Age hill forts are present in Wighton.	
Wilby	TM032 900	A number of earthworks have been identified as former areas of habitation of the now shrunken village of Wilby.	
West Wretham	TL900 914	Deserted medieval village mentioned in the Domesday Book and Nomina Villarum. Abandoned by 1793.	
Wimpwell or Whimpwell	North-east of Happisburgh	Village mentioned in the Domesday Book. Possibly lost to coastal erosion in the 15th century.	
Windall or Windle	TM427 939	Approximate site of deserted medieval village. Also known as Wyndale.	
Winston	TM401 931	The parish was joined with Gillingham in 1440 with the parish church having fallen into disuse by the 14th century.	
Wolterton	TG164 324	Deserted village on the site of Wolterton Hall. Mentioned in the Domesday Book and the Nomina Villarum, it had 37 tax payers in 1377.	
Wyndale	See Windall		
Wyveling	TF692 205	Deserted medieval settlement with Saxon and medieval pottery finds. Manor noted with Bawsey in the Nomina Villarum.	

== List of possible lost settlements ==
In addition to confirmed or strongly suspected sites of lost villages, there are other locations which are believed to be the site of lost settlements. These are generally deserted medieval villages where there is some archaeological or other evidence to suggest that settlements existed but where identification is uncertain.

Settlement name	Grid reference	Notes	Refs.
East Walton	TF74 15	Possible site of a deserted medieval settlement.	
Flockthorpe	TG043 039	Possible site of deserted medieval settlement.	
Gnattington	TF721 375	Marked on a map of 1631 as Gnattington Green and possibly the site of a deserted medieval village.	
Hackford	TG077 222	Possible site of Hackford deserted medieval village. Hackford remained a separate parish until 1935. The site of the village is unclear. All Saints church was lost to fire in 1543 and little remains.	
Helmingham or Morton	TG125 158	A possible site for Helmingham deserted medieval village, mentioned in the Domesday Book and Nomina Villarum. It is also suggested that Helmingham is elsewhere in the parish of Morton on the Hill and this site is possibly the village of Morton.	
Salle	TG118 250	Earthworks in Salle Park which are indicative of a possible medieval village site.	
Whitwell	TG089 214	Possible approximate site for a deserted medieval village.	
Wicken	TF805176	Possible site of deserted medieval village.	

== See also ==
- List of lost settlements in the United Kingdom
