= Alethorpe =

Deserted medieval village in Norfolk, England

Coordinates: 52.844°N 0.894°E

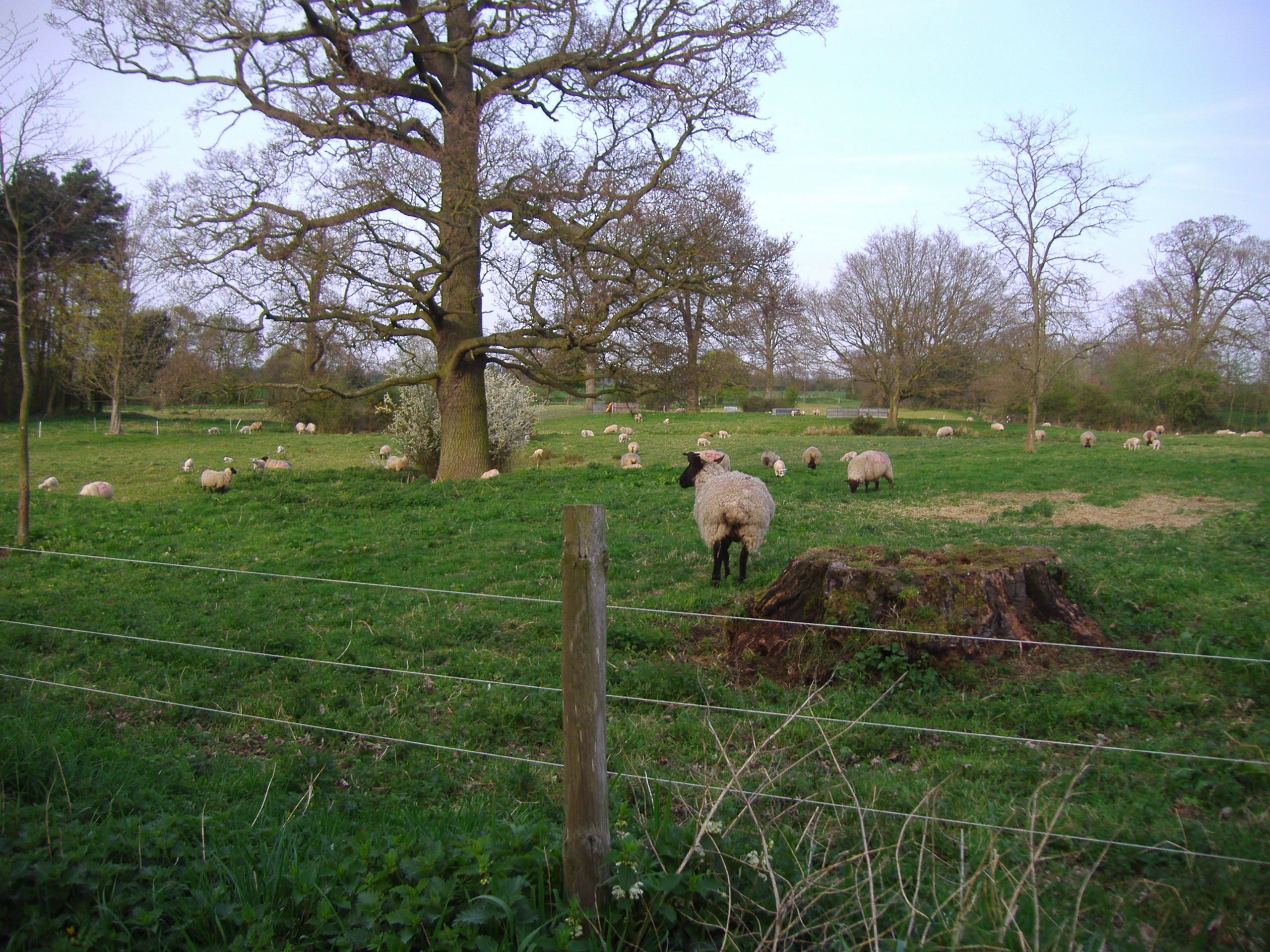
- The site of Alethorpe

- Location within Norfolk
- OS grid reference: TF948313
- Civil parish: Little Snoring
- District: North Norfolk
- Shire county: Norfolk
- Region: East
- Country: England
- Sovereign state: United Kingdom
- Post town: FAKENHAM
- Postcode district: NR21

Alethorpe is a deserted medieval village site and former civil parish, now in the parish of Little Snoring, Norfolk, England. It is south-east of Little Snoring, around 2 miles (3.2 km) north-east of Fakenham and 23 miles (37 km) north-west of Norwich, north of A148 road. The village is one of around 200 lost settlements in Norfolk. It was abandoned in the 16th century, probably because the landlord enclosed the land. It is occasionally referred to as Althorp in historical literature. In 1931, the parish had a single resident.

== History ==
The village of Alethorpe is mentioned in the Domesday Book, under the name of Alatorp, a small settlement with a taxable value of 0.6 geld. The land was held by King William. A late Saxon disc brooch was discovered on the site in 1985.

Alethorpe was recorded in the Nomina Villarum surveys. In the surveys, Alethorpe is recorded as hosting thirty houses in 1272, twelve taxpayers in 1329, eleven in 1332, twelve in 1377, and ten households in 1496.

The village was abandoned by the early 17th century, probably due to land enclosure; a 1604 petition by the last inhabitants was delivered to Sir Nicholas Bacon of Stiffkey, Justice of the Peace, against enclosure. The parish church, which was dedicated to All Saints, was in use in 1552. It was used as a barn by 1602 in poor repair. Three skeletons were unearthed in 1962 in what is assumed to have been the churchyard.

By the middle of the 19th century, Alethorpe was classified as an extra-parochial area in the Gallow Hundred. From 1858, Alethorpe was a civil parish, although united with Fakenham for religious purposes, until it was abolished on 1 April 1935 and merged with Little Snoring. The parish covered around 240 acres (97 ha) and was farmland.

In 1869, the parish consisted of one farm with a population of four. By 1891, it had a population of nine, and by 1911 this had fallen again to five.

== Modern Alethorpe ==
Alethorpe Hall, a modern building, stands on the village site. A tree stands on the site of the church. A few low and generally indistinct earthworks remain, along with possible trackways and a house platform, whilst a flint-built barn at the hall dates from 1677. A small row of cottages, named Alethorpe Cottages, lies along the A148 road to the south-east of the site.
