= Egmere medieval settlement =

Archaeological site in Norfolk, England

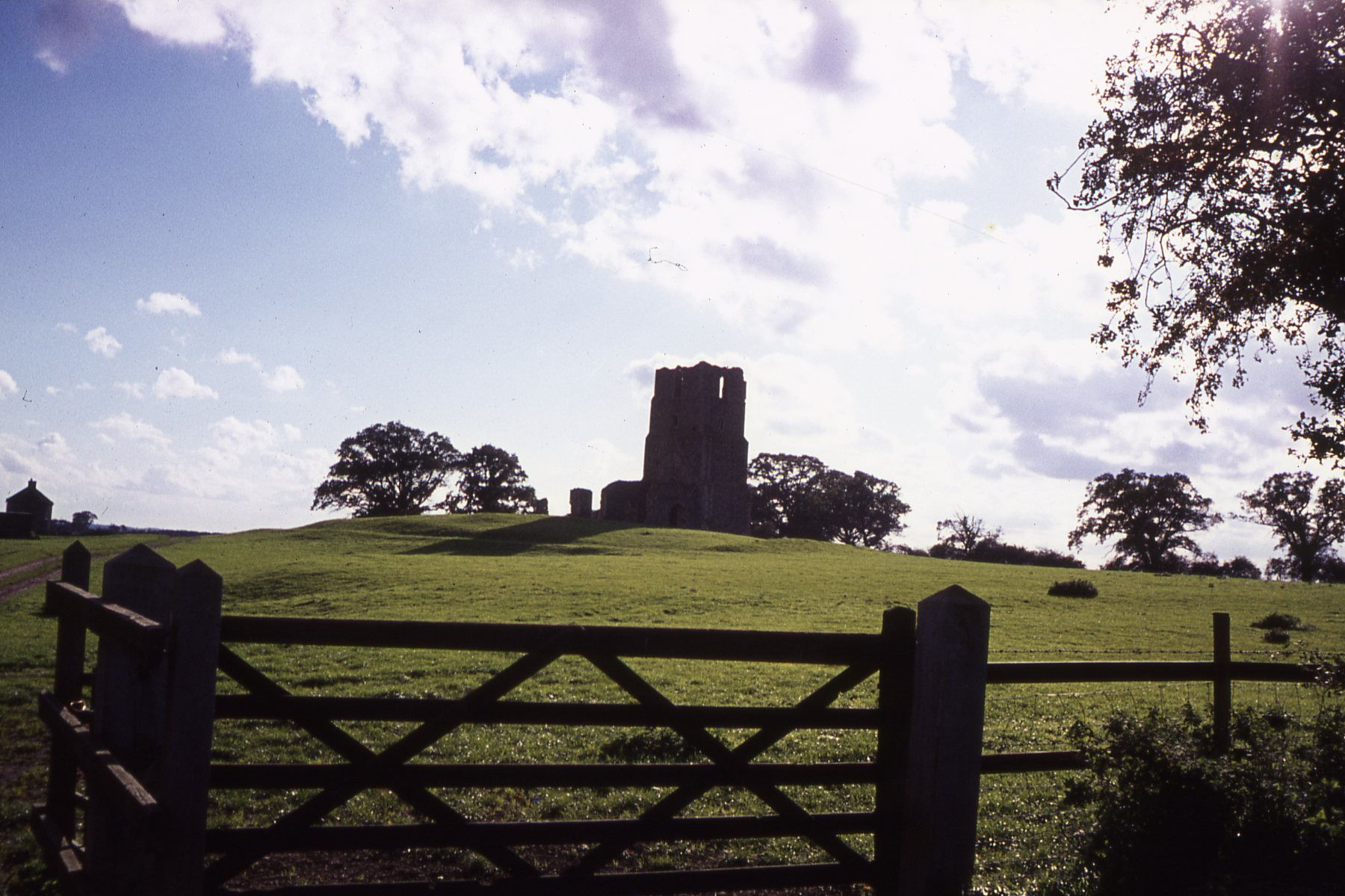
- Looking south from the present road towards the ruins of St Edmund's Church

- Location within Norfolk
- 52°54′5″N 0°49′3″E
- Location: Norfolk
- OS grid reference: TF 895 377

Scheduled monument
- Designated: 12 April 1976
- Reference no.: 1018173

Egmere medieval settlement is a deserted medieval village in Norfolk, England, about 2.5 miles (4.0 km) west of Walsingham. It is a Scheduled Monument.

== History ==
The manor of Egmere was recorded in the Domesday Book of 1086 as being held by the Bishop of Thetford. Subsidy rolls show a decline in population: in Egmere and Quarles there were 31 taxpayers in 1334, 10 in 1449 and 5 in 1523. After the Dissolution of the Monasteries in 1538, the King granted the manor and patronage of the church to Sir James Boleyn. A report in 1603 noted that there was one household in Egmere, and that the church had become a barn.

The church of St Edmund, now a ruin, dates from the 12th century; its tower is of the early 14th century. It is a Grade II* listed building.

Egmere remained a civil parish until 1935 and is now part of Walsingham.

== Earthworks ==
The remains are on either side of the minor road between the villages of North Creake and South Creake in the west, and Walsingham in the east.

South of the road are the ruins of the Church of St Edmund and the site of a manor house. The church and churchyard are on a mound about 3 metres (9.8 ft) above its surroundings. The church tower stands almost to its original height, and parts remain of the walls of the nave. The site of the manor house, about 125 metres (410 ft) south-south-east of the church, is now occupied by two cottages; south of this are the earthwork remains of a formal garden, with a long rectangular ornamental pond, about 100 metres (330 ft) long, on its southern edge.

An area west of the church and manor house, along a stream, shows rectangular platforms, the sites of village buildings.

North of the modern road are the remains of fishponds, and other features; there are channels thought to be evidence of a system for controlling the flow of water to and from the ponds.

The main street of the village survives as a ditch: it runs south along the east side of the area north of the modern road; south of the modern road it bends to the south-west, passing immediately north of the church.

== See also ==
- List of lost settlements in Norfolk
- Waterden medieval settlement, a neighbouring site to the south-west
