= Crostwick Marsh =

Protected area in Norfolk, England

Coordinates: 52.699°N 1.346°E

- Site of Special Scientific Interest
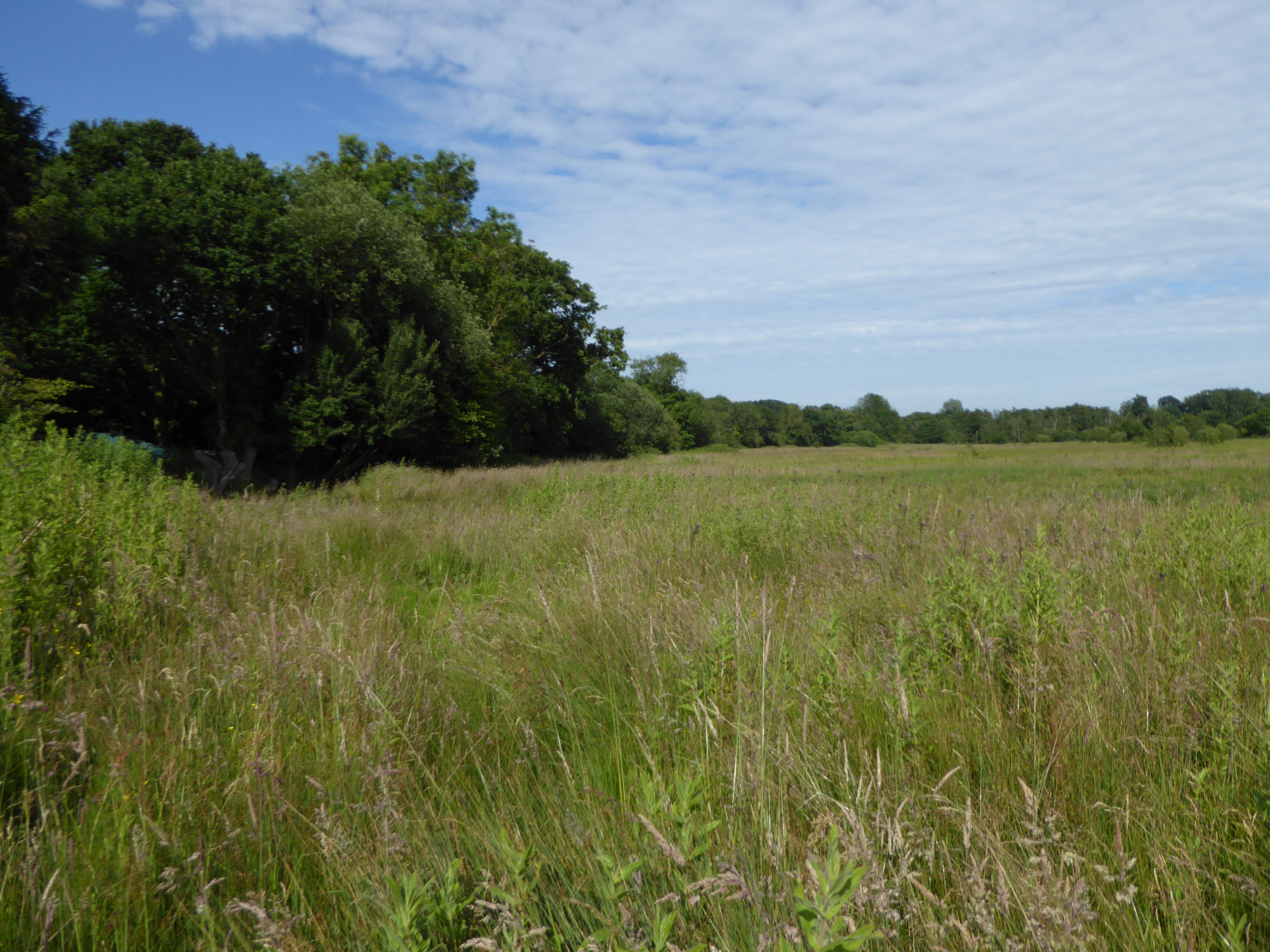
- Location of Crostwick Marsh.
- Area of search: Norfolk
- Grid reference: TG 262 165
- Interest: Biological
- Area: 11.6 hectares (29 acres)
- Notification date: 1985
- Location map: Magic Map

Crostwick Marsh is an 11.6-hectare (29-acre) biological Site of Special Scientific Interest in Crostwick, north of Norwich in Norfolk, England. It is part of the Broadland Ramsar site and Special Protection Area, and The Broads Special Area of Conservation.

This marsh is in the valley of the Crostwick Beck, a tributary of the River Bure. It has areas of damp grassland, tall fen, species-rich fen grassland, alder carr, scrub and dykes. There is a variety of breeding marshland birds.

Pedestrian access by footpath between North Walsham Road and Granny Bard's Lane.
