= Bixley medieval settlement =

Deserted village in Norfolk, England

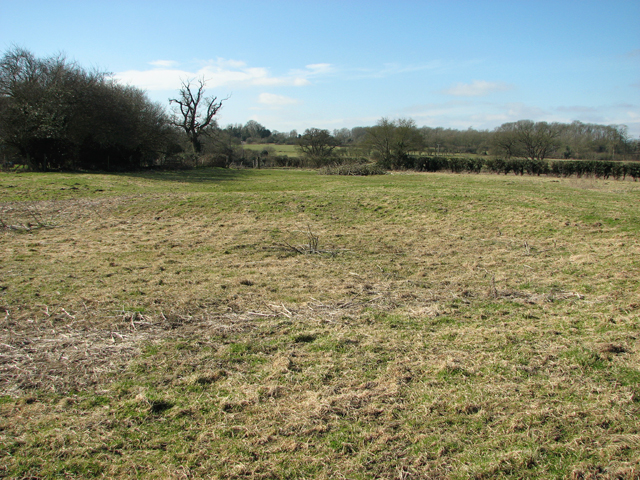
- Looking north-east across the site

- Location within Norfolk
- 52°35′42″N 1°20′7″E
- Location: Bixley, Norfolk
- OS grid reference: TG 259 049

Scheduled monument
- Designated: 20 August 1998
- Reference no.: 1018177

Bixley medieval settlement is a deserted medieval village in Norfolk, England, about 2 miles (3.2 km) south-east of Norwich in the former parish of Bixley. It is a Scheduled Monument.

== History ==
The Domesday Book of 1086 recorded that there were 19 adult males in Bixley. The population, shown later from tax records, was small in the 14th and 15th centuries compared to other villages in the hundred. In 1524 there were five taxpayers.

Neighbouring settlements at Arminghall and Belhawe have also disappeared. It is thought that villages near Norwich became deserted at the end of the medieval period due to people migrating to the city.

The church of St Wandregeselius is on the western edge of the site. Its tower dates from the early 14th century; the rest of the church dates from 1868. It is a Grade II* listed building. The roof and interior were destroyed by a fire in 2004.

== Earthworks ==
Historic England notes that the remains are "among the most extensive of their kind in this region of East Anglia." Most of the earthworks are east of a green lane, part of a former road from Norwich to Bungay, closed in 1800, that passes immediately west of the church. Remains can be discerned of several groups of two or three homesteads; the groups are 85–150 metres (279–492 ft) apart. Between the groups there is evidence of small fields and other enclosures, and of a system of lanes.

The adult male population of the village in 1086, recorded in the Domesday Book, included three bordars and thirteen sokemen: it is thought that this kind of population is shown by the arrangement of the settlement at Bixley.

== See also ==
- List of lost settlements in Norfolk
