= Waterden medieval settlement =

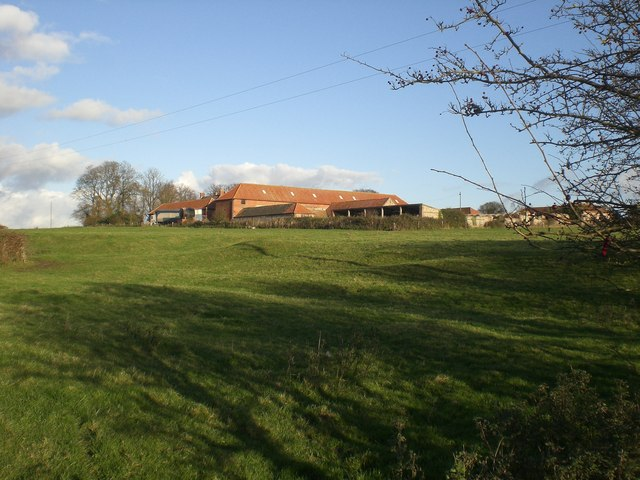
- Looking north-east across the site, towards Waterden Farm

- Location within Norfolk
- 52°53′26″N 0°48′11″E
- Location: Norfolk
- OS grid reference: TF 887 363

Scheduled monument
- Designated: 17 August 1976
- Reference no.: 1018174

Waterden medieval settlement is a deserted medieval village in Norfolk, England, about 3 miles (4.8 km) west of Walsingham. It is a Scheduled Monument.

== History ==
Waterden is recorded in the Domesday Book of 1086 as a small settlement, and is mentioned in Nomina Villarum of 1316. The subsidy roll of 1332 recorded 24 people contributing to the lay subsidy. The Black Death of 1349 evidently had no significant effect, since it was not awarded tax relief in the 1350s.

In 1449 the lay subsidy was reduced more than for the neighbouring settlements; by the early 16th century Waterden was not regarded as a separate village for taxation purposes. By the early 18th century the area of the settlement had been enclosed.

A hall was built in the 16th century, and is shown on a map of 1714. It was demolished in 1781.

== Earthworks ==
The main street (shown on the map of 1714) of the medieval village runs north-east to south-west along the bottom of a shallow valley. Part of this is now a modern trackway with a channeled stream alongside. North-west of the present farmhouse there is the indication, up to 1 metre (3 ft 3 in) deep and width about 15 metres (49 ft), of a former lane leading away from the main street, towards the south-east. North of this and east of the main street are a row of five rectangular homesteads and indication of a back lane beyond; west of the main street is indication of a large enclosure, in which the 16th-century hall was situated, and three small enclosure to the north-east.

South-west of the modern trackway, the medieval main street runs through what was a green (shown on the map of 1714) of width about 32 metres (105 ft). East of the green, there is a north-west facing scarp, height about 2 metres (6 ft 7 in), the area above the scarp being divided by two discernable trackways, of width about 6 metres (20 ft), running towards existing farm buildings to the east. There are enclosures between the trackways. West of the green, there is a chain of later ponds; west of these, parts of three homesteads can be discerned. The remaining traces of these, in an adjoining field, have been lost by ploughing, but have been recorded by aerial photography.

== See also ==
- List of lost settlements in Norfolk
- Egmere medieval settlement, a neighbouring site to the north-east
