= Hoste baronets =

Extinct baronetcy in the Baronetage of the United Kingdom

The Hoste Baronetcy, of the Navy, was a title in the Baronetage of the United Kingdom. It was created on 21 September 1814 for the naval commander Captain William Hoste. The title became extinct on the death of the fourth Baronet in 1915.

== Hoste baronets, of the Navy (1814) ==
- Sir William Hoste, 1st Baronet (1780–1828)
- Sir William Legge George Hoste, 2nd Baronet (1818–1868)
  - Dorothy Augusta, married on 1891 John Bevill Fortescue.
- Sir William Henry Charles Hoste, 3rd Baronet (1860–1902)
- Sir William Graham Hoste, 4th Baronet (1895–1915). He left no heir. He was killed in action during World War I with the Rifle Brigade, at the Second Battle of Ypres.

Baronetage of the United Kingdom
Preceded by Collier baronets	Hoste baronets of the Navy; 21 September 1814	Succeeded by Cuyler baronets
