= William Hoste =

Royal Navy officer

Captain Sir William Hoste Bt KCB
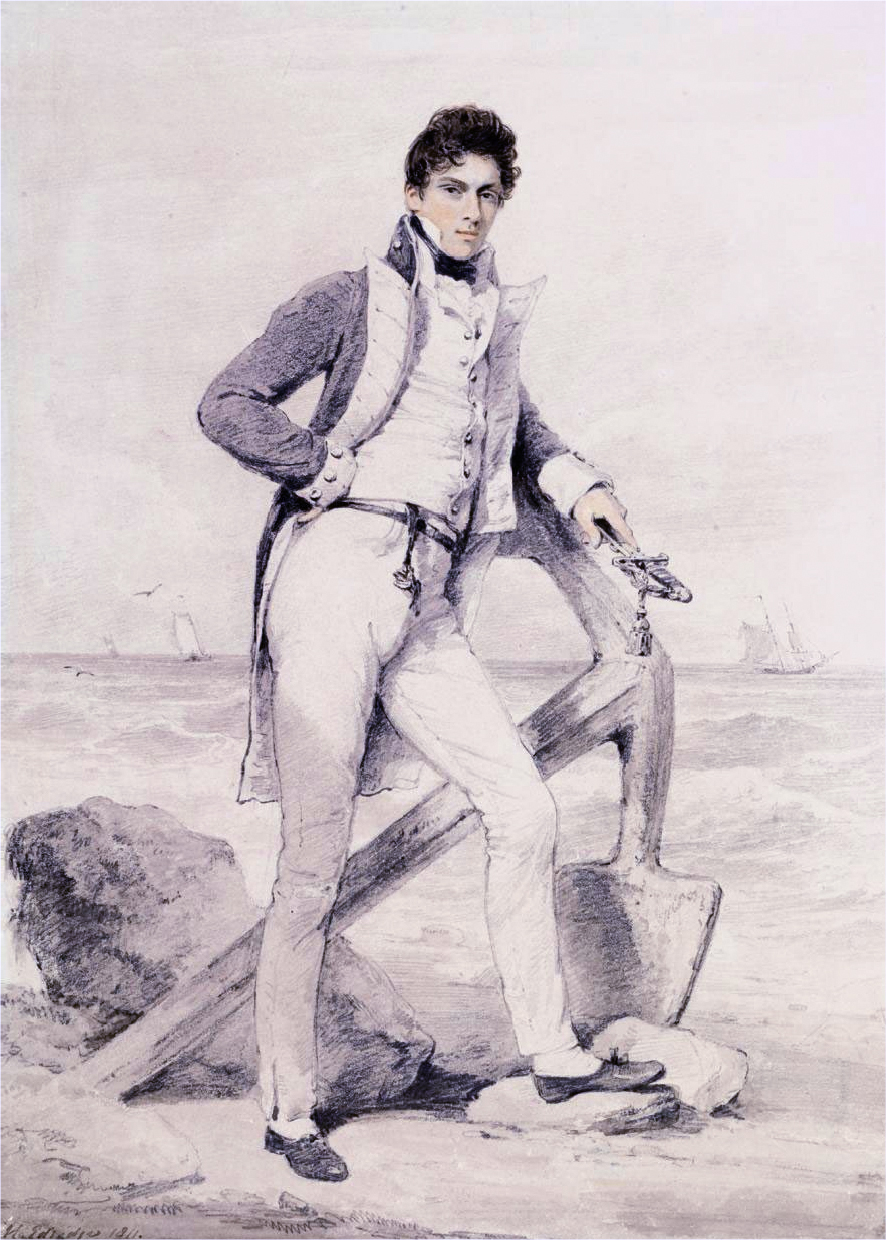
- Born: 26 August 1780; Ingoldisthorpe, Norfolk
- Died: 6 December 1828 (aged 48); London, England
- Spouse: Harriet Walpole (m. 1817)
- Military career
- Allegiance: Great Britain; United Kingdom
- Branch: Royal Navy
- Service years: 1793–1828
- Rank: Captain
- Commands: HMS Mutine; HMS Greyhound; HMS Eurydice; HMS Amphion; HMS Bacchante
- Conflicts: French Revolutionary Wars; Battle of Genoa; Battle of Hyères Islands; Battle of Cape St Vincent; Battle of Santa Cruz de Tenerife; Battle of the Nile; Napoleonic Wars; Battle of Lissa; Siege of Cattaro; Siege of Ragusa

Captain Sir William Hoste, 1st Baronet, KCB (26 August 1780 – 6 December 1828) was a Royal Navy officer who served in the French Revolutionary and Napoleonic Wars. A protégé of Lord Nelson, he was one of the most talented frigate captains of the Napoleonic Wars.

Hoste's greatest achievement was during the Adriatic campaign of 1807–1814 where he not only neutralised the French frigate fleet at the Battle of Lissa in 1811, but with Austrian support swept French forces entirely from the Dalmatian coast by early 1814. The most notable feats included the capture of the heavily fortified ports of Kotor and Dubrovnik.

== Childhood and education ==
He was the second of eight children of Reverend Dixon Hoste (1750–1805) and Margaret Stanforth. At the time of his birth his father was rector of Godwick and Tittleshall in Norfolk. He was born at Ingoldisthorpe, and the family later moved to Godwick Hall, east of Tittleshall, which was leased from Thomas Coke, who later became the 1st Earl of Leicester, of Holkham Hall. His next brother, George Charles Hoste, became an officer in the Royal Engineers.

Hoste was educated for a time at King's Lynn and later at the Paston School in North Walsham, where Horatio Nelson himself had been to school some years previously. Dixon Hoste had arranged for Hoste's name to be entered in the books of HMS Europa as a Captain's servant when he was just 5 years old, although he would not actually go to sea until he reached the age of 12 or 13.

That time coincided with the outbreak of war with France in February 1793. Lacking any influence or naval contacts himself, Dixon Hoste asked his landlord, Thomas Coke, for assistance and was introduced to Nelson, then living nearby in Burnham Thorpe and who had recently been appointed as Captain of HMS Agamemnon a 64-gun third-rate, which was being fitted out at Chatham Dockyard.

== Early career ==
=== HMS Agamemnon ===
Nelson accepted Hoste to join him as a captain's servant on HMS Agamemnon, which he boarded at Portsmouth at the end of April 1793. The ship joined the Mediterranean Fleet under Lord Hood, and it was in the Mediterranean and Adriatic that Hoste saw most of his naval service. Extracts from Nelson's letters to his wife mention Hoste frequently; for example: 'without exception one of the finest boys I ever met with' and 'his gallantry never can be exceeded, and each day rivets him stronger to my heart'. Another captain's servant on Agamemnon was Josiah Nisbet, Nelson's stepson, but the letters suggest that Hoste quickly became a favourite and that Josiah compared badly with him in many respects. Hoste was promoted to midshipman by Nelson on 1 February 1794 and served with him during the blockade of and subsequent assault on Corsica on 7 February.

=== HMS Captain and the battle of Cape St Vincent ===
Hoste moved with Nelson to HMS Captain in 1796 and was with him at the Battle of Cape St Vincent, When a British fleet under Admiral Sir John Jervis defeated a Spanish fleet almost twice its size. Captain was heavily involved in the fighting and captured the larger San Josef and San Nicolas of 112 and 80 guns, respectively.

Captain started the battle towards the rear of the British line. Instead of continuing to follow the line, Nelson disobeyed orders and wore ship, and made for the Spanish van, which consisted of the 112-gun San Josef, the 80-gun San Nicolas and the 130-gun Santísima Trinidad. Captain engaged all three, assisted by HMS Culloden which had come to her aid. After an hour of exchanging broadsides which left both Captain and Culloden heavily damaged, Nelson found himself alongside the San Nicolas which he boarded and forced her surrender. San Josef attempted to come to the San Nicolas's aid, but became entangled with her compatriot and was left immobile. Nelson led his party from the deck of the San Nicolas onto the San Josef and captured her as well.

=== HMS Theseus ===
In June 1797, he transferred to HMS Theseus a 74-gun third-rate. Theseus was a 'troubled' ship, and Nelson and a few handpicked officers, including Hoste, Captain Ralph Willett Miller and Lieutenant John Weatherhead, were sent aboard to restore order. The tactic was successful and Nelson received a letter from the would-be mutineers which stated, "We thank the Admiral (Nelson) for the Officers he has placed over us".

In July, Theseus was present at the Battle of Santa Cruz de Tenerife, although Hoste remained aboard and took no part in the assault. Following the death of a Lieutenant Weatherhead in the battle, Nelson promoted Hoste to lieutenant to fill the vacancy, his position being confirmed, thanks to his 'book time' in Europa, in February 1798.

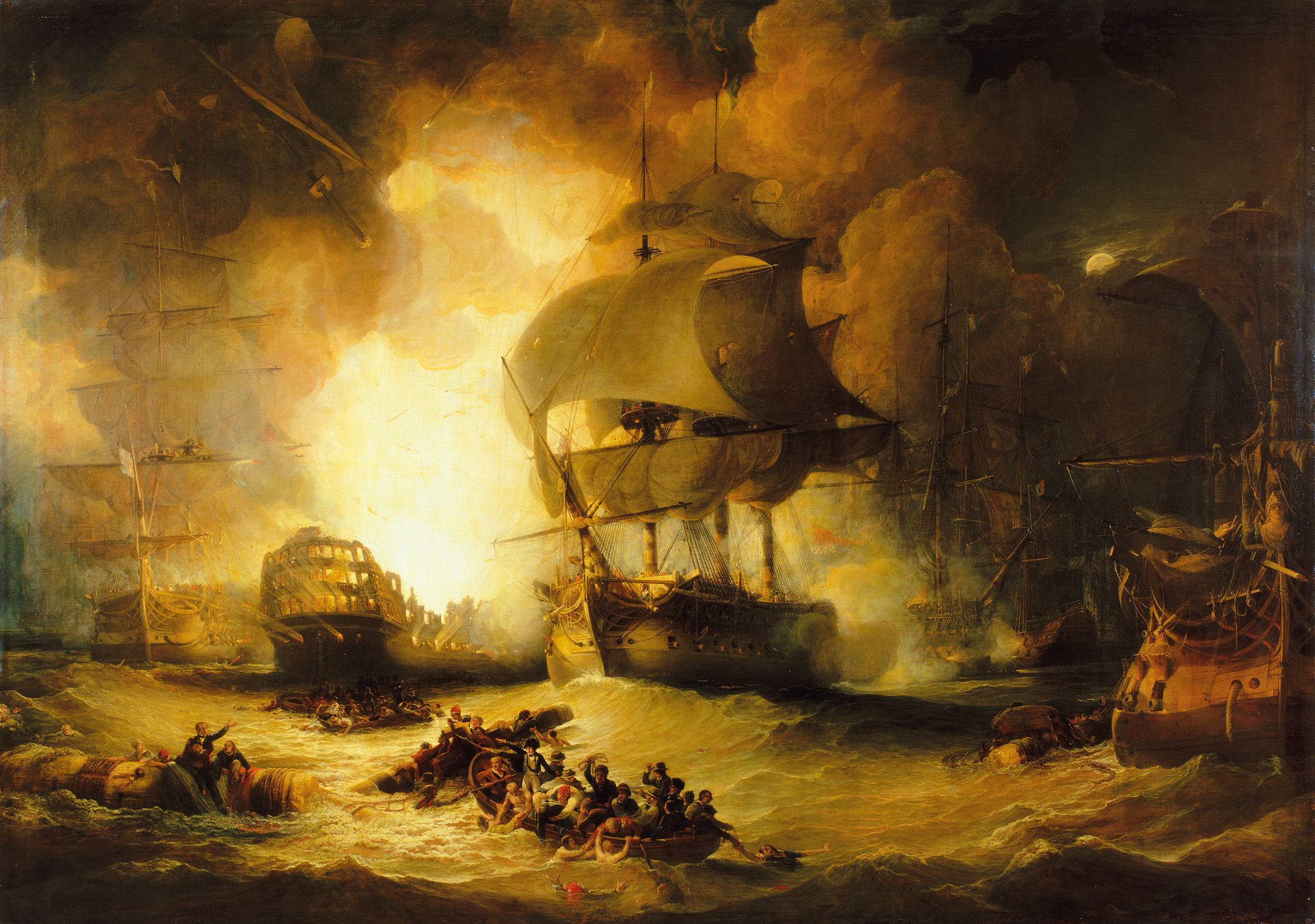
The destruction of L'Orient at the Battle of the Nile by George Arnald

=== The battle of the Nile ===
Later that year, Hoste, still aboard HMS Theseus, was at the Battle of the Nile. The Royal Navy fleet was outnumbered, at least in firepower, by the French fleet, which boasted the 118-gun ship-of-the-line L'Orient, three 80-gun warships and nine of the popular 74-gun ships. The Royal Navy fleet in comparison had just thirteen 74-gun ships and one 50-gun fourth-rate. Nevertheless, the battle was a decisive victory for the British.

Following the battle, Nelson sent his report to London, taking the precaution of sending a duplicate in the brig HMS Mutine, commanded by Lieutenant Thomas Capel. At Naples, Capel was to carry on with the dispatch, handing command of Mutine to Hoste. Upon taking command, Hoste became an acting-captain at the age of 18. Hoste, carrying news of the victory, first sailed to Gibraltar, before rejoining the fleet, under St Vincent, off Cádiz. His promotion was confirmed in December 1798.

== Command ==
Hoste continued in command of the Mutine for the next three years, campaigning in Italy under Nelson, where in the autumn of 1799, he took part in the capture of Rome. He later served under Lord Keith, who knew little of him and his career appeared to have stalled until, possibly at Nelson's prompting, he was promoted post-captain by Lord St Vincent, First Lord of the Admiralty, in January 1802.

At this time, Hoste was in Alexandria, where he contracted malaria and then a lung infection, which were to have a lasting effect on his health. He convalesced with Lord and Lady Elgin in Athens, where he began an education in classical antiquity, completed following his appointment to the frigate HMS Greyhound in Florence, when his ship was cruising on the Italian coast.

Hoste served almost continuously throughout the Peace of Amiens, returning to England briefly in April 1803 before being given command of HMS Eurydice in October.

== Notable actions ==
Nelson summoned him to Cádiz in September 1805 and gave him command of the 32-gun frigate HMS Amphion. Sent on a diplomatic mission to Algiers, he missed the Battle of Trafalgar by a matter of days, and only learned of Nelson's death on his return in November. He wrote to his father – "Not to have been in it is enough to make one mad, but to have lost such a friend besides is really sufficient to almost overwhelm me" (Hoste's letters).

A number of successes while engaged on active service in the Mediterranean over the following 18 months brought Hoste to the attention of Lord Collingwood, who sent him into the Adriatic Sea. Here he single-handedly conducted an aggressive campaign against the ships and coastal installations of the French and their allies, bringing much of the coastal trade in the region to a halt. By the end of 1809, Hoste and his crew had captured or sunk over 200 ships.

His endeavours were rewarded with command, as commodore, of a small detachment of frigates, comprising HMS Amphion, HMS Active (36 guns), HMS Volage (22 guns) and HMS Cerberus (32 guns), operations continued and by establishing a base at Lissa, now known as Vis, Hoste was able to dominate the Adriatic with just four ships. In March and April 1810 alone, they took or destroyed 46 vessels.

The French and their allies became so frustrated by the disruption to their shipping that a Franco-Italian squadron, under the command of an aggressive frigate commander named Bernard Dubourdieu, was dispatched and on 13 March 1811 they attacked Hoste's small force in what became known as the Battle of Lissa.

=== Battle of Lissa ===
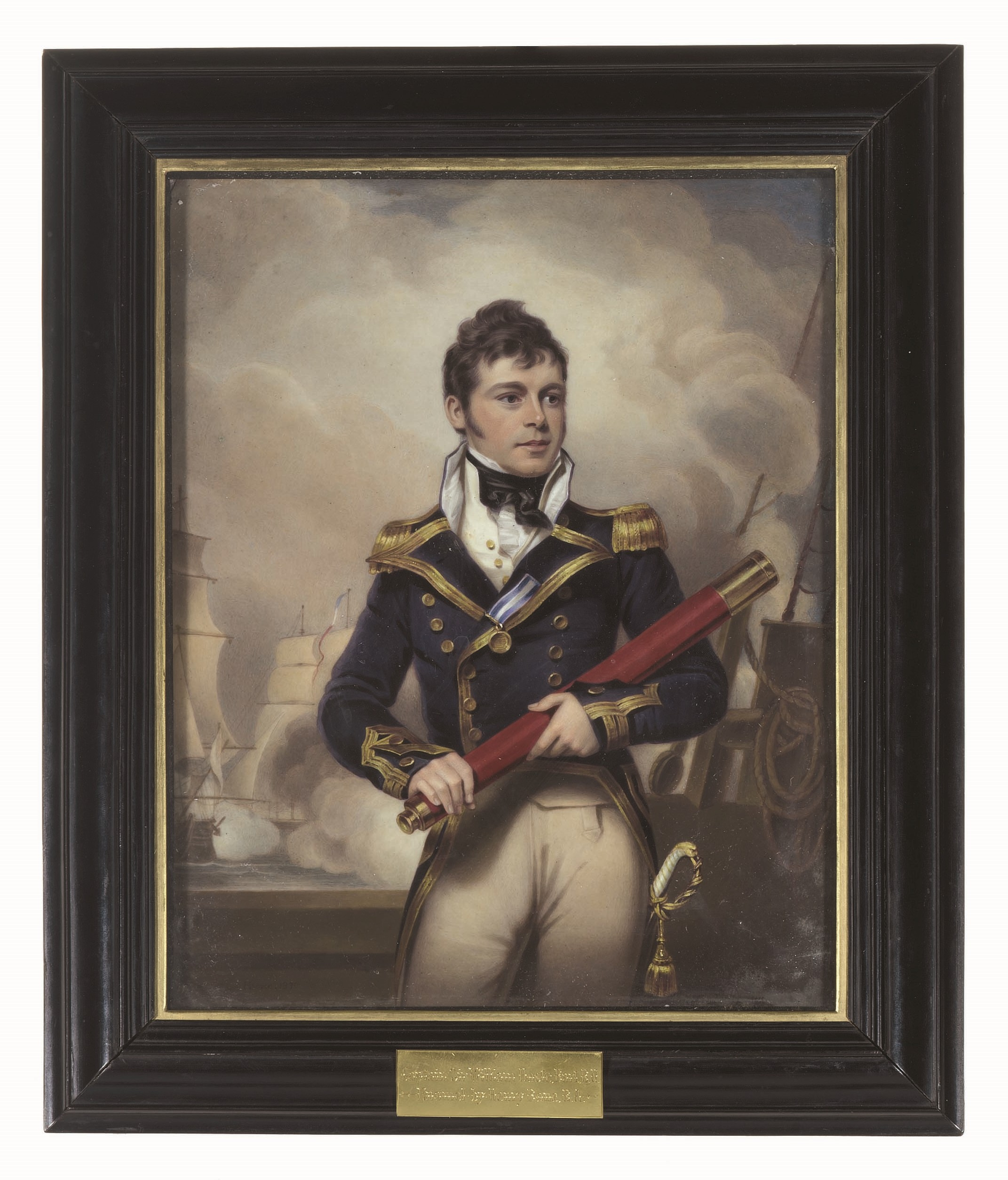
Portrait of Hoste

Dubourdieu's squadron of seven frigates and four smaller warships possessing a total of 276 guns and nearly 2,000 men significantly outnumbered Hoste with his 4 frigates mounting only 124 guns and manned by less than 900 men. The French officer imitated Nelson's attack at Trafalgar by sailing down on the British line from windward with his ships in two lines. However, signalling 'Remember Nelson' to rally his men, Hoste used his superior seamanship and gunnery to overcome the larger Franco-Italian squadron, with the loss of 50 men killed and 132 wounded. Dubourdieu was killed, one of the French frigates was driven on shore and two of the Italian ships were taken.

Hoste's signal had a profound effect on his men. It was universally greeted with loud cheers and Captain Phipps Hornby of Volage wrote of it later: "Never again so long as I live shall I see so interesting or so glorious moment".

Amphion was so badly damaged that she was obliged to return to England, where Hoste was given the command of HMS Bacchante (38 guns), although he did not return to the Adriatic in her until 1812.

=== Sweep along the Dalmatian coast ===
Hoste in the Bacchante had been given orders by Freemantle for the swift expulsion of the French in the region. He was assisted with the brig-sloop HMS Saracen (18 guns), under Captain John Harper. Hoste continued to demonstrate the same kind of initiative and aggression as before. He helped capture Spalato (Split) in November 1813 with the assistance from the 35th regiment of foot. They took part in an attack that seized the islands of Hvar and Brač and moved along the coast.

Then working with Montenegrin forces, he attacked the mountain fortress of Cattaro, hauling ships' cannon and mortars to positions above the fort using block and tackle. The French garrison had no alternative but to surrender, which it did on 5 January 1814. Hoste immediately repeated these tactics at Ragusa (now Dubrovnik), which also surrendered later on the 27th.

== Later life ==
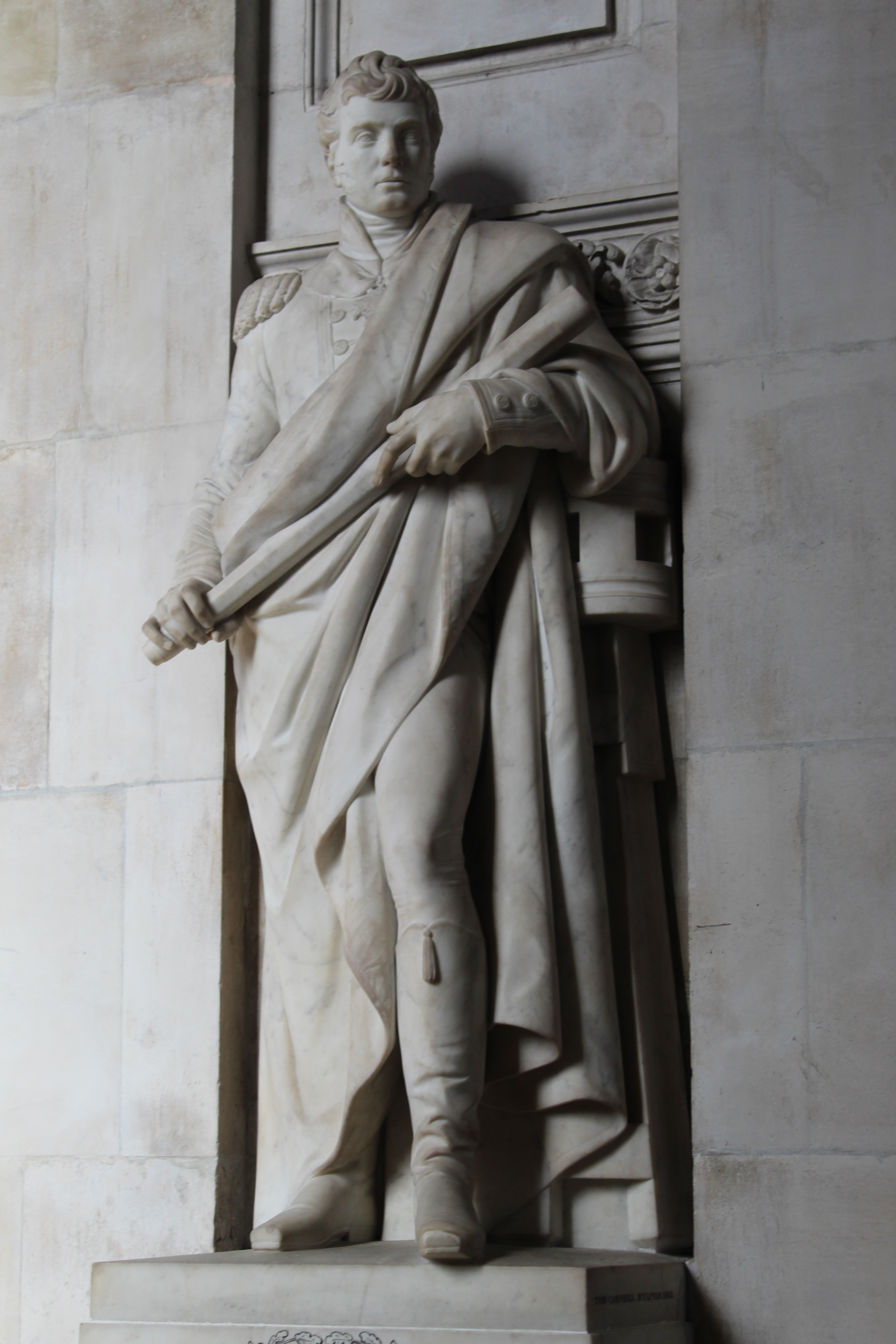
Statue of William Hoste by Thomas Campbell, St Paul's Cathedral

Hoste's health, compromised by his malaria and earlier lung infection, worsened and he was forced to return to England. In 1814, he was made a baronet, and in 1815 he was knighted KCB. In 1825, he was appointed to the royal yacht Royal Sovereign.

In January 1828, he developed a cold which affected his already weakened lungs, and he died of tuberculosis in London on 6 December 1828. He was buried in St John's Wood Church Grounds, London. There is a memorial to him at St Paul's Cathedral in London.

== Personal life ==
He married Lady Harriet Walpole (1 March 1792 – 18 April 1875) on 17 April 1817. She was the daughter of Horatio Walpole, 2nd Earl of Orford and Sophia Churchill. They had the following children:

- Caroline Harriet Clementina Hoste.
- Priscilla Anne Hoste (Unknown – 21 October 1854).
- Admiral Sir William Legge George Hoste (19 March 1818 – 10 Sept 1868).
- Theodore Oxford Raphael Hoste (31 July 1819 – 1835).
- Psyche Rose Elizabeth Hoste (4 April 1822 – 8 July 1904).
- Wyndham Horatio Nelson Hoste (2 Feb 1825 – 1906).

== Legacy ==
Hoste's actions at Cattaro and Ragusa were later immortalised in fiction, where they are attributed to Captain Jack Aubrey, the principal character in Patrick O'Brian's 20 novels of the Aubrey–Maturin series. His actions at Lissa were also immortalised in the Kydd series, where they are attributed to Captain Thomas Kydd, the protagonist of the Kydd series written by Julian Stockwin.

One of the southernmost islands of Chile is named Hoste Island after him. A small islet in the entrance to the bay of Vis town is named Host after him, while the Sir William Hoste Cricket Club in Vis was founded by the Croatian islanders after learning that he had organised the game there during the British occupation of the island.

The Hoste Hotel in Burnham Market, Norfolk, is such named after William Hoste and features a Lord Nelson museum tribute.

Once, while in conversation with Hoste's father, Nelson remarked:

His worth as a man and an officer exceeds all which the most sincere friend can say of him. I pray God to bless my dear William.

Lord Radstock once wrote:

I look at you (Hoste) as the truly worthy eleve of my incomparable and ever to be lamented friend the late Lord Nelson.

== Notes ==
Baronetage of the United Kingdom
New creation	Baronet (of the Navy); 1814–1828	Succeeded by William Hoste
