= Godwick =

Deserted village in Norfolk, England

Coordinates: 52.762436°N 0.831°E

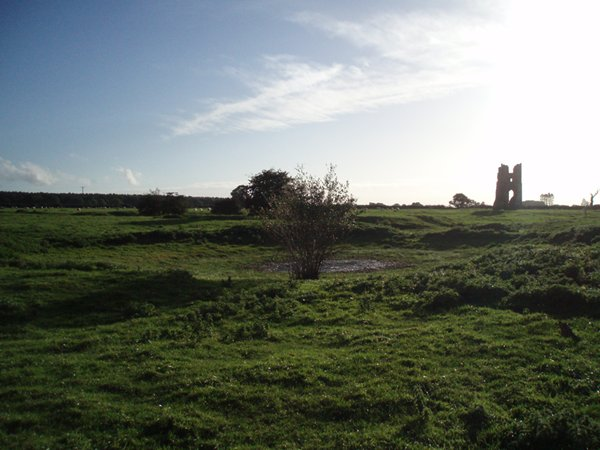
- The church tower at the site of Godwick village

- Location within Norfolk
- Civil parish: Tittleshall
- District: Breckland
- Shire county: Norfolk
- Region: East
- Country: England
- Sovereign state: United Kingdom

Godwick is a deserted village in the county of Norfolk. Its location was south of Fakenham between the villages of Tittleshall and Whissonsett. There are over 200 deserted medieval villages in Norfolk, but most sites have been destroyed by ploughing, the pressures of two world wars or other agricultural uses. Only a few still have impressive surface remains. The earthworks at Godwick are well preserved because the site is grazed by sheep and has never been disturbed. Today it is one of the best surviving examples in the county and the only one open to the public. There is agreement between the owner and English Heritage over the opening and the management of the site, which is open between April and September from 9:30 am until dusk. On site there are information panels with displays of aerial photographs, maps and interpretation plans of this lost village. The earthworks are a scheduled monument. It is an offence to disturb the site or use metal detectors without the written permission of English Heritage.

== Origins ==
Godwick was first settled in the Anglo-Saxon period. By the 15th century Godwick was a small village which was a relatively stable community, but was comparatively poor alongside neighbouring settlements. It was in the 15th century that the village declined sharply. A series of bad harvests, and the difficulty of cultivating the heavy boulder clay soil, eventually proved too much for the dwindling population. In 1428 there were under ten households. By 1508 a survey taken showed that of 18 properties on the north side of the main street, 11 were empty and three had no land holdings attached. The same survey showed that a church lay to the south and there was also a watermill with a millpond. By 1595 further decay left Godwick virtually deserted. Its final stages of decay were recorded in an estate map of 1596 when only three or four houses remained and the church tower had collapsed.

== The village today ==
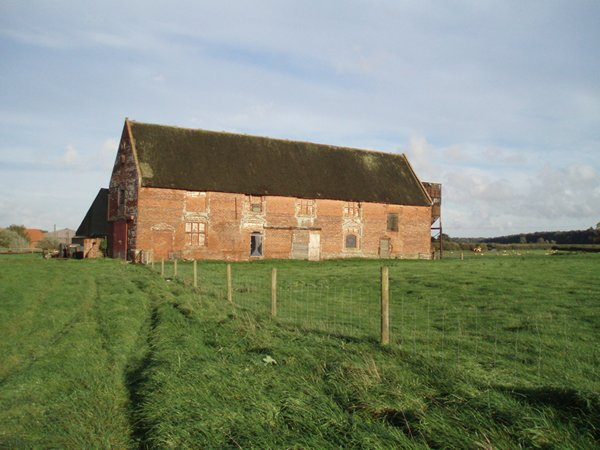
Godwick barn

What remains of the medieval village today, consisted of a sunken way running east to west with two other roads running off to the south. Along both sides of the street can be seen banks and ditches separating individual house plots. About ten of these still remain to be seen. The church stood within a similar enclosure in an angle between the streets. At the eastern end of the site, the village street ran along a dam holding back a millpond with a small watermill at the far end. The line of the dam is now covered by farm buildings. In 1981 a remaining part of the church tower survived a collapse. The 13th-century church tower had been raised as a brick and flint folly when the church was pulled down in the 17th century. This folly may well have formed part of a scheme of landscape architecture for the later Godwick Manor. Inspection of the 1981 collapse found evidence of a Norman church amongst the rubble. Also still to be seen on the site is a large 13th-century red-brick barn with an elaborate façade, built over the line of the street. During the reign of Charles II, 200 men were garrisoned there and although access is barred, it is possible to walk round it and enjoy its beautiful windows.

== The later Godwick Manor ==
In 1585, in the middle of the deserted village, Sir Edward Coke, Chief Justice and Attorney General to Elizabeth I, built a fine brick manor house, having purchased the estate in 1580. The ruins of the house, which was E-shaped with an impressive two-storey porch and windows, were pulled down in 1962. Its square outline can just be picked out as slight humps in the grass. It had a walled yard and entrance to the north, and around the hall a pattern of formal gardens and enclosures was laid out.

Godwick Manor was the birthplace of Admiral Sir William Hoste.

== See also ==
- List of lost settlements in Norfolk
