= Ickburgh =

Village in Norfolk, England

Coordinates: 52.52162°N 0.66638°E

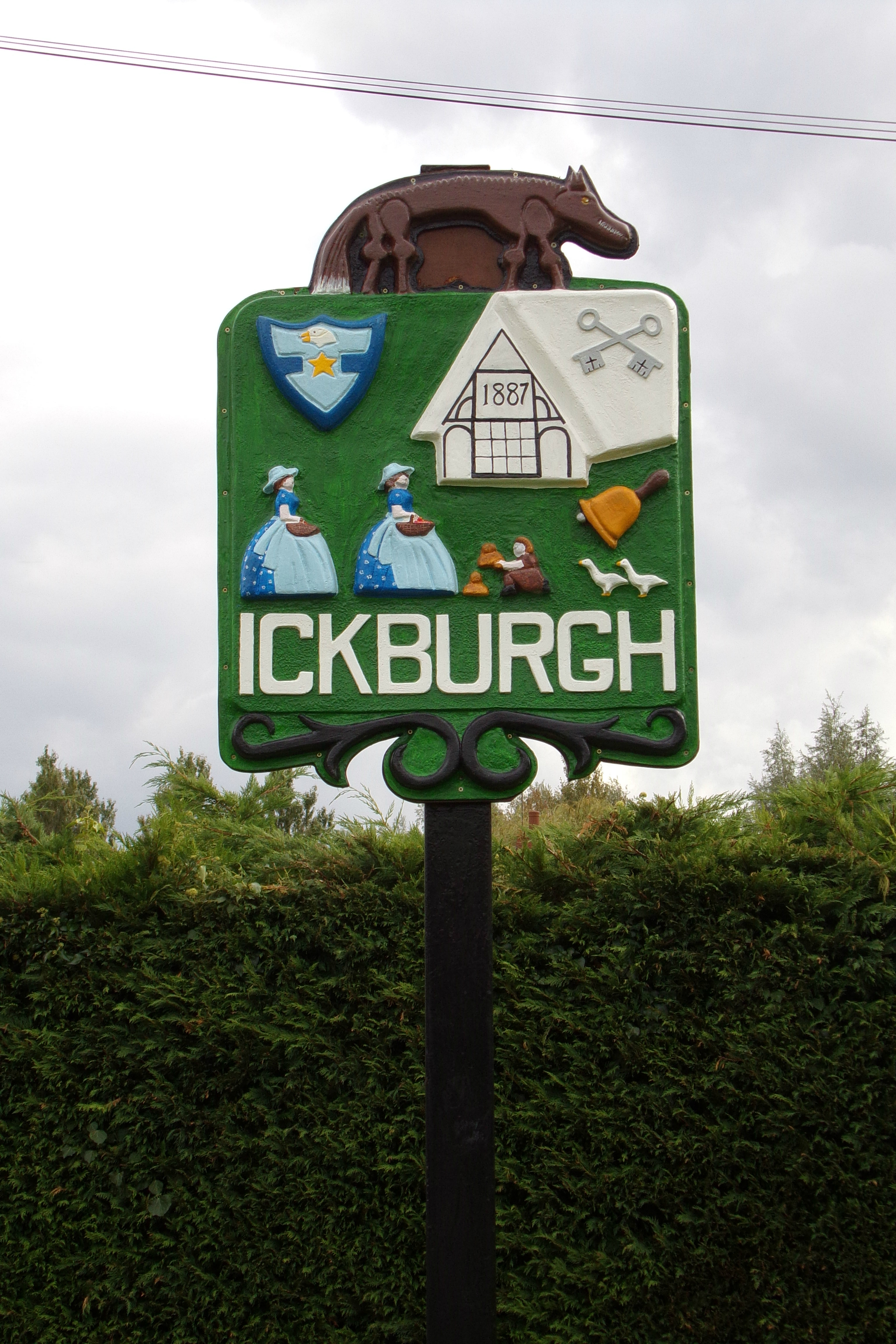
- Ickburgh Village Sign

- Location within Norfolk
- Area: 11.84 sq mi (30.7 km^{2})
- Population: 350 (2021 census)
  - Density: 30/sq mi (12/km^{2})
- OS grid reference: TL809948
- District: Breckland
- Shire county: Norfolk
- Region: East
- Country: England
- Sovereign state: United Kingdom
- Post town: THETFORD
- Postcode district: IP26
- Dialling code: 01842
- UK Parliament: South West Norfolk

Ickburgh is a village and civil parish in the Breckland district of Norfolk, England.

Ickburgh is located 8.1 miles (13.0 km) north of Thetford and 27 miles (43 km) west of Norwich.

== History ==
Ickburgh's name is of Anglo-Saxon origin and derives from the Old English for Icca's fortification.

In the Domesday Book, Ickburgh is listed as a settlement of 17 households in the hundred of Grimshoe. In 1086, the village was divided between the East Anglian estates of William de Warenne, Ralph de Tosny, Walter Giffard and Roger, son of Rainard.

Ickburgh was the site of a medieval leper house which were eventually converted into houses.

In 1942, large parts of the parish became part of the Stanford Training Area. Furthermore, parts of the parish became High Ash Camp which was used by the 7th Armoured Division in preparation exercises for the Normandy landings. Today, a Cromwell tank has been mounted on a plinth to commemorate the use of the training area.

== Geography ==
According to the 2021 census, Ickburgh has a population of 350 people which shows an increase from the 309 people recorded in the 2011 census.

The River Wissey passes through the parish.

== St. Peter's Church ==
Ickburgh's parish church is dedicated to Saint Peter and dates from the 14th century. St. Peter's is located on The Street and has been Grade II listed since 1960. The church is no longer open for Sunday services.

Though the churchtower of St. Peter's is from the medieval period, the remainder of the church was rebuilt in 1860s. During this restoration, new stained-glass was installed in the church.

== Governance ==
Ickburgh is part of the electoral ward of Bedingfeld for local elections and is part of the district of Breckland.

The village's is in the constituency of South West Norfolk, which has been represented by Labour's Terry Jermy since 2024.

== War Memorial ==
Ickburgh War Memorial is a stone plinth topped with a carved statue of a grieving woman. The memorial lists the following names for the First World War:

| Rank | Name | Unit | Date of death | Burial/Commemoration |
|---|---|---|---|---|
| Sjt. | Harry Browning MM | 7th Bn., Norfolk Regiment | 3 Aug. 1918 | Hollybrook Memorial |
| Sjt. | Jack Bloy | 8th Bn., Norfolk Regt. | 7 Oct. 1916 | Boulogne Cemetery |
| LCpl. | Albert Browning | Norfolk Regt. | 1 Dec. 1918 | St. Peter's Churchyard |
| LCpl. | Albert J. Bloy | 8th Bn., Norfolk Regt. | 1 Jul. 1916 | Thiepval Memorial |
| Pte. | Charles Wicks | 36th Bn., Royal Fusiliers | 28 Apr. 1918 | Boulogne Eastern Cemetery |
| Pte. | Wilfred G. Gillings | 1st Bn., Norfolk Regiment | 15 May 1917 | Aubigny-en-Artois Cemetery |
| Pte. | Albert E. Chilvers | 2nd Bn., Norfolk Regt. | 28 Sep. 1915 | Basra War Cemetery |
| Pte. | George Wicks | 5th Bn., Norfolk Regt. | 22 May 1917 | Gaza War Cemetery |
| Pte. | Edward Fuller | 7th Bn., Queen's Own Regiment | 29 Aug. 1918 | Daours Cemetery |
| Pte. | Ernest H. Woollard | Queen's Royal Regiment | 2 Sep. 1918 | Péronne Cemetery |
| Pte. | Albert R. Adams | 10th Bn., Sherwood Foresters | 9 Jun. 1918 | Niederzwehren Cemetery |
| Pte. | George Theobald | 9th Bn., Royal Sussex Regiment | 5 Feb. 1918 | Gouzeaucourt British Cemetery |
