= Langford, Norfolk =

Village in Norfolk, England

Coordinates: 52.5357°N 0.7078°E

Langford
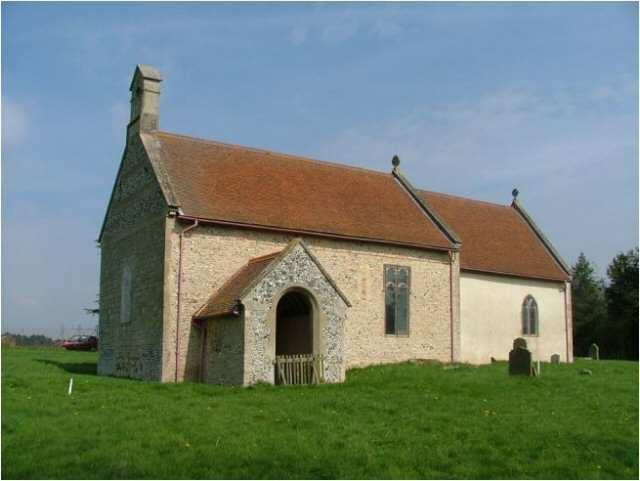
- Saint Andrew, Langford, Norfolk

- Location within Norfolk
- OS grid reference: TL8396
  - London: 91.9 miles (147.9 km)
- Civil parish: Ickburgh
- District: Breckland
- Shire county: Norfolk
- Region: East
- Country: England
- Sovereign state: United Kingdom
- Post town: THETFORD
- Postcode district: IP24
- Police: Norfolk
- Fire: Norfolk
- Ambulance: East of England

Langford is a village and former civil parish, now in the parish of Ickburgh, in the Breckland district, in the county of Norfolk, England. The village is in the Norfolk battle training area of the Ministry of Defence which is an area with restricted entry. Langford is about nine miles south of the town of Swaffham. In 1931 the parish had a population of 34.

== History ==
The village's name means 'Long ford'.

Langford has an entry in the Domesday Book of 1086, in which it is recorded as Langaforde. The main landholder is named as Hugh de Montfort and the survey also states that there are two mills, a fishery, and two beehives.

On 1 April 1935 the parish was abolished and merged with Ickburgh.

=== Evacuation ===
During the Second World War, the village was taken over by the British Army when it was incorporated into the Stanford Battle Area. The military ranges were needed to prepare Allied infantry for Operation Overlord (the Battle of Normandy in 1944). Though some villagers were said to be happy to give up their homes to help the War effort, the majority were less than enthusiastic, with a number of heated village meetings and some refusing to leave the area. This was the subject of a book Farming, on a Battle Ground written by Lucille Reeve, one of those who refused to leave, writing under the pseudonym A Norfolk Woman.

However at the close of World War II, the former villagers were never allowed to return to their homes by the War Office. Most of the inhabitants of Langford were not landowners, and rented the houses and farmed the land belonging to the Walsingham estates. Though they had been promised that they could return to their homes after the war, the government later reneged on the promise and bought the land, threatening Walsingham with a compulsory purchase order. As the majority of the inhabitants were not landowners, they received very little in compensation, were put into council housing and many lost their livelihoods. They continued to fight for many years to return to their homes and farmland but the beginnings of the Cold War and the need for dedicated training areas removed all chances of a return.

Since the evacuation, the village and its parish remain within the Ministry of Defence's Thetford infantry training area. Access is not allowed without special permission.

== The Parish Church of St Andrew ==
The parish church is a simple affair made up of two cells which date from the Norman period. The church once had a medieval tower, but this was lost sometime in the 18th century. The bell turret is late Victorian, in a Norman style. The eaves of the church have curious carved faces on the east elevation: a grinning cat to the south, a wild man to the north.
