= John Weatherhead =

18th-century officer of the Royal Navy

- Born: 1775
- Died: 29 July 1797 (aged 21–22)
- Military career
- Allegiance: United Kingdom
- Branch: Royal Navy
- Rank: Lieutenant
- Units: HMS Agamemnon; HMS Captain; HMS Theseus
- Conflicts: War of the First Coalition; Battle of Cape St. Vincent; Battle of Santa Cruz de Tenerife

John Weatherhead (1775 – 29 July 1797) was an officer of the Royal Navy. He served during the long campaign in the Mediterranean as part of a division under the command of Samuel Hood. He was with Lord Nelson in Corsica in 1794 when he nearly succumbed to dysentery and malaria. Weatherhead was present at the Battle of Cape St Vincent and was mortally wounded during the Battle of Santa Cruz de Tenerife.

== Background ==
Weatherhead was born in July 1775 and baptised in Brancaster, Norfolk on 18 July 1775. The son of the local rector, the Reverend Thomas Weatherhead. At the age of 17, he joined the Royal Navy and was, along with William Hoste, one of a group of boys from Norfolk who went to sea in the year of 1793, and who served under Nelson.

== Naval campaigns ==
=== Mediterranean ===
Weatherhead joined HMS Agamemnon as a midshipman, shortly after Nelson was appointed her captain. Agamemnon was part of a squadron under the command of Vice-Admiral Hotham, sent to the Mediterranean with the intention of establishing naval superiority. Joined later by Admiral Samuel Hood's fleet, the force sailed initially to Gibraltar and then Toulon, arriving in July. Toulon was largely under the control of moderate republicans and royalists, but was under threat from the forces of the National Convention. The city authorities therefore requested that Hood take the city under his protection and the Agamemnon was sent first to the Sardinia and then Naples to request reinforcements. The requests were successful, and 2,000 men and several ships were mustered by mid-September. The force arrived back in Toulon on 5 October to find that the French army had occupied the hills surrounding the city and was bombarding it. Hoping the town could hold out, Hood sent Agamemnon to join a squadron operating off Cagliari. On the way they encountered a French Squadron. Nelson promptly gave chase, firing on the 40-gun Melpomene. The Agamemnon inflicted considerable damage but the remaining four French ships turned to join the battle and, realising he was outnumbered, Nelson withdrew and continued to Cagliari, arriving on 24 October.

=== Corsica ===
On 26 October, after Agamemnon had been repaired, Weatherhead found himself on the way to Tunis with a squadron under Commodore Robert Linzee. On arrival, Nelson was given command of a small squadron consisting of the Agamemnon, three frigates and a sloop, and ordered to blockade the French garrison on Corsica. The fall of Toulon at the end of December 1793 meant the Agamemnon's mission to Corsica had added significance, as it could provide the British a naval base close to the French coast. Hood therefore sent reinforcements during January 1794. A British assault force landed on the island on 7 February, and the squadron moved to intensify the blockade off Bastia. For the rest of the month it carried out raids along the coast and intercepted enemy shipping. Towards the end of the month, troops under Lieutenant-General David Dundas entered the outskirts of Bastia.After surveying the enemy positions, they withdrew, Dundas claiming that the French were too well entrenched to risk an assault. Nelson disagreed and a protracted debate between the army and naval commanders followed. By late March the arguments had been resolved and Nelson began to land guns from his ships and emplace them in the hills surrounding the town. On 11 April the British squadron entered the harbour and opened fire, whilst Nelson took command of the land forces and commenced bombardment. After 45 days, the town surrendered. Nelson subsequently prepared for an assault on Calvi, working in company with Lieutenant-General Charles Stuart. It was around this time that Weatherhead contracted both dysentery and malaria, a combination that almost killed him.

=== HMS Captain ===
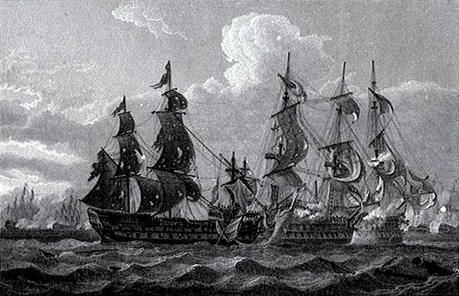
HMS Captain by James Fittler and Nicholas Pocock

It is unclear how long Weatherhead was laid up for but he was certainly fit for duty in the June 1796 when Agamemnon was sent home for urgent repairs, and Weatherhead, along with Nelson, transferred to the third-rate, HMS Captain. After overseeing the evacuation of British nationals from Leghorn and transporting them to Corsica, Captain was ordered to blockade the newly captured French port. In July she oversaw the occupation of Elba, but by September the Genoese had broken their neutrality to declare in favour of the French. By October, the Genoese position and the continued French advances led the British to decide that the Mediterranean Fleet could no longer be supplied; they ordered it to be evacuated to Gibraltar. Weatherhead was also present during the withdrawal from Corsica. In December 1796 Nelson moved his flag to the frigate HMS Minerve, covering the evacuation of the garrison at Elba, HMS Captain being deemed too large and slow for the operation. Nelson returned to HMS Captain in time to take part in the Battle of Cape St Vincent on 14 February 1797.

=== Cape St Vincent ===
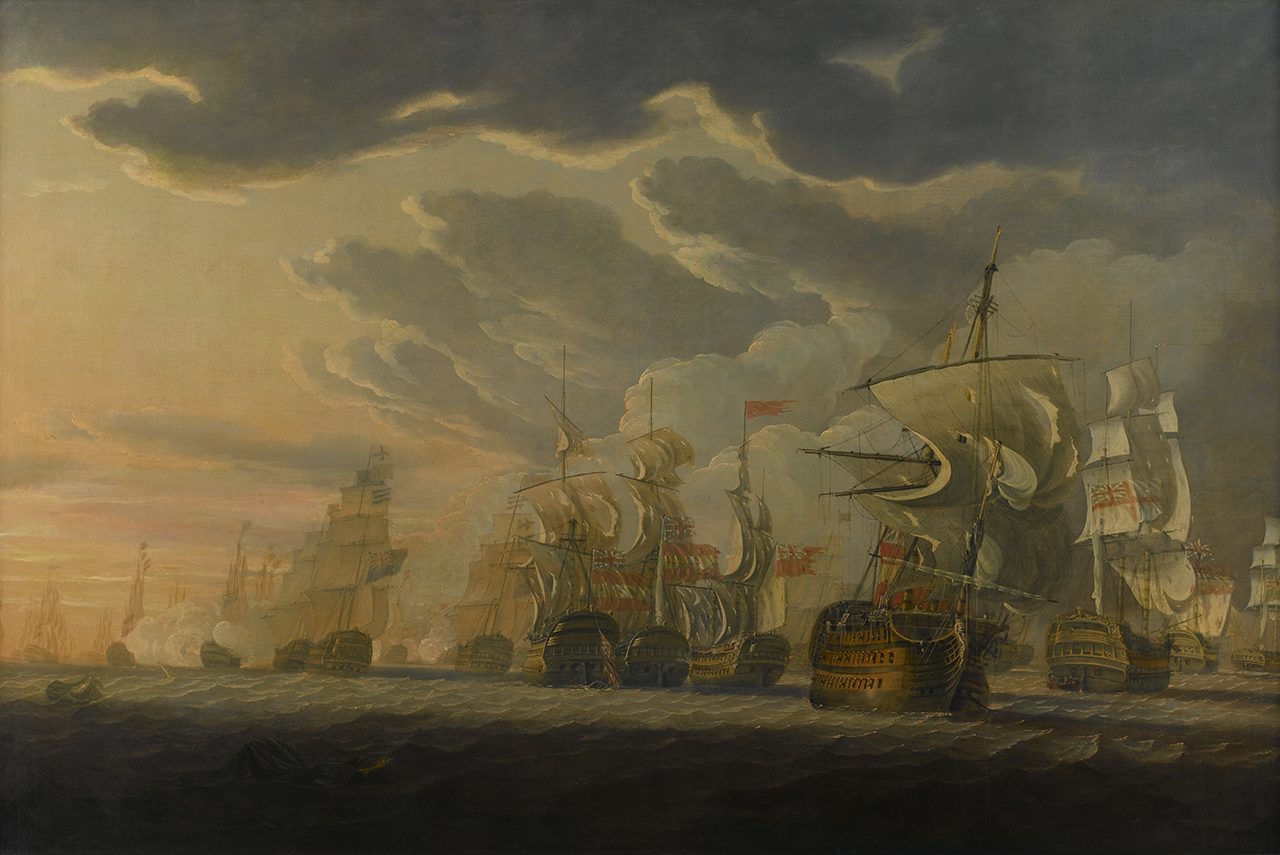
Battle of Cape St Vincent by Robert Cleveley

At the battle of Cape St Vincent, on 14 February 1797, Captain was to the rear of the British line. Instead of continuing to follow the line, Nelson disobeyed orders from the commander in chief, Sir John Jervis and wore ship, breaking from the line and heading to engage the Spanish van, which consisted of the 112-gun San Josef, the 80-gun San Nicolas and the 130-gun Santísima Trinidad. Captain engaged all three, assisted by HMS Culloden which had come to her aid. After an hour of exchanging broadsides, Captain found herself alongside the San Nicolas. Nelson led a boarding party across and forced her surrender. San Josef attempted to come to the San Nicolas's aid, but became entangled with her compatriot and was left immobile. Nelson led his party from the deck of the San Nicolas onto the San Josef and captured her as well. After the battle, the Spanish sought refuge in Cádiz where they were subsequently blockaded by the British.

=== HMS Theseus ===
In May 1797, HMS Theseus joined Jervis's fleet. The Theseus was a troubled ship and the crew were bordering on mutinous. Jervis saw the officers in charge as responsible and requested that Nelson take over. Nelson took with him a number of his trusted followers including Midshipman William Hoste and the newly promoted Lieutenant John Weatherhead. Weatherhead must have played a part in suppressing the half mutinous crew. A letter from the crew stated, "We thank the Admiral (Nelson) for the Officers he has placed over us". On 27 May 1797, Theseus was ordered to lie off Cádiz to monitor the Spanish fleet and await the arrival of Spanish treasure ships from the American colonies. On 3 July, Theseus took part in a bombardment and an amphibious assault on the port.

=== Santa Cruz de Tenerife ===
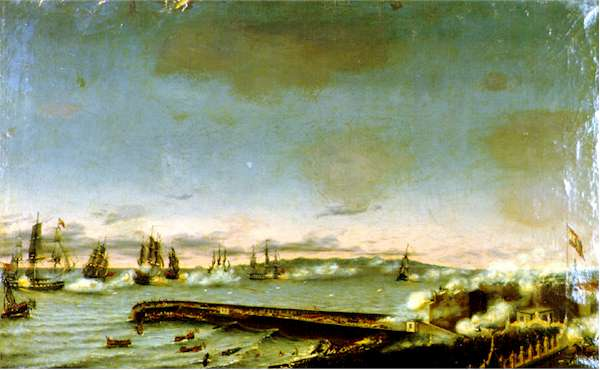
Battle of Santa Cruz de Tenerife by Francisco de Aguilar

The battle plan for the assault on Santa Cruz called for a combination of naval bombardments and an amphibious landing. The initial attempt was called off after adverse currents hampered the assault and the element of surprise was lost. Nelson immediately ordered another assault but this was beaten back. He prepared for a third attempt, to take place during the night. Although he personally led one of the battalions, the operation ended in failure: the Spanish were better prepared than had been expected and had secured strong defensive positions. Several of the boats failed to land at the correct positions in the confusion, while those that did were swept by gunfire and grapeshot. Nelson's boat reached its intended landing point but as he stepped ashore he was hit in the right arm by a musketball, which fractured his humerus bone in multiple places. Weatherhead was in Nelson's boat that night and managed to get ashore under a hail of shot, but was hit in the stomach. One of the Spaniards, Bernardo Cólogan, found Weatherhead on the beach near death. Cólogan used his shirt to bandage Weatherhead and arranged for his returned to the Theseus. However, Weatherhead's condition did not improve and he died four days later on 29 July 1797.

Nelson wrote in a letter to Weatherhead's father, "...Believe me I have largely partaken in our real cause for grief in the loss of a most excellent young man", and "....when I reflect on that fatal night I cannot but bring sorrow and his fall before my eyes".

William Hoste, who had recently been made Lieutenant in Weatherhead's place, wrote:

He (Weatherhead) was the darling of the ship's company and universally beloved by every person who had the pleasure of his Acquaintance.

== Literature ==
- Coleman, Terry (2001). Nelson: The Man and the Legend. London: Bloomsbury Publishing. ISBN 978-0-7475-5900-9. OCLC 50269717.
- Hibbert, Christopher (1994). Nelson: A Personal History. New York City: Basic Books. ISBN 978-0-201-40800-3. OCLC 41382882.
- Oman, Carola (1987). Nelson. London: Hodder & Stoughton. ISBN 978-0-340-40672-4. OCLC 15197836.
- Sugden, John (2004). Nelson: A Dream of Glory. London: Jonathan Cape. ISBN 978-0-224-06097-4. OCLC 56656695.
- White, Colin (2002). The Nelson Encyclopaedia. Rochester: Chatham Publishing. ISBN 978-1-86176-185-9. OCLC 49593759.
- White, Colin (2005). Nelson: The Admiral. Phoenix Mill, Stroud, Gloucestershire: Sutton Publishing. ISBN 978-0-7509-3713-9. OCLC 61176712.
