= Pudding Norton =

Village in Norfolk, England

Coordinates: 52.81957°N 0.845947°E

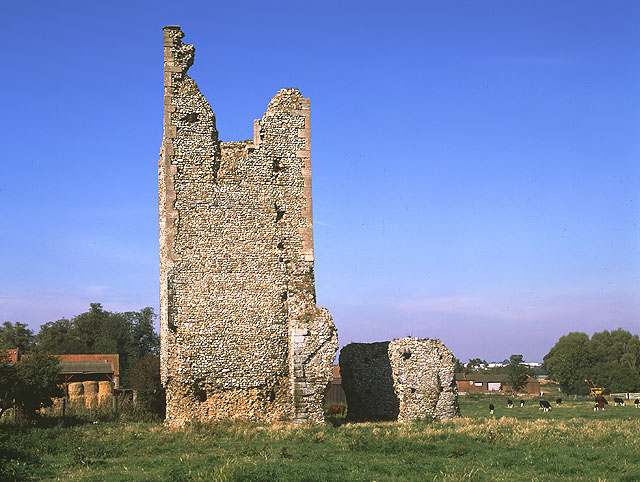
- Remains of St. Margaret's Church, Pudding Norton

- Location within Norfolk
- Area: 5.95 km^{2} (2.30 sq mi)
- Population: 252
  - Density: 42/km^{2} (110/sq mi)
- OS grid reference: TF918284
- Civil parish: Pudding Norton
- District: North Norfolk
- Shire county: Norfolk
- Region: East
- Country: England
- Sovereign state: United Kingdom
- Post town: FAKENHAM
- Postcode district: NR21
- Police: Norfolk
- Fire: Norfolk
- Ambulance: East of England

Pudding Norton is a village and civil parish in the English county of Norfolk. It covers an area of 2.30 mi^{2} (6.0 km^{2}) and (including Testerton) had a population of 267 in 126 households at the 2001 census, falling to 252 at the 2011 Census. For the purposes of local government, it falls within the district of North Norfolk.

The village's name means "north farm/settlement". The origins of the affix "Pudding" are obscure.

Pudding Norton civil parish contains the villages of Pudding Norton and Testerton, both of which became largely deserted by the post-medieval period. Pudding Norton village sits at the centre of the parish, and earthworks to the south and east show the previous medieval extent of the village.

== Buildings ==
Only two buildings of architectural interest remain. The first, the church of Saint Margaret, retains just the walls of its west tower and part of the west end of the nave. It was constructed in flint and limestone, and is thought to date to the 12th and 13th centuries.

The second is the Grade II Listed Pudding Norton Hall, a building initially built in the 17th century, reconstructed in the 18th and 19th centuries, and since developed into a farmhouse.

Of possible interest is an hexagonal pillbox (sometimes referred to as a blockhouse) and possible gun emplacement dating to the Second World War and situated just west of the village of Testerton.
