= Testerton =

Village in Norfolk, England

Coordinates: 52.80328°N 0.87337°E

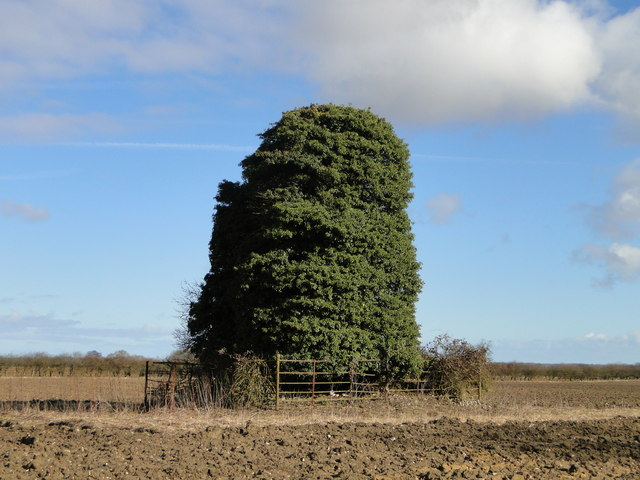

- Location within Norfolk
- OS grid reference: TF936267
- Civil parish: Pudding Norton
- District: North Norfolk
- Shire county: Norfolk
- Region: East
- Country: England
- Sovereign state: United Kingdom
- Post town: FAKENHAM
- Postcode district: NR21
- Dialling code: 01328
- Police: Norfolk
- Fire: Norfolk
- Ambulance: East of England
- UK Parliament: North Norfolk

Testerton is a small village and former civil parish, now in the parish of Pudding Norton, in the North Norfolk district, in the county of Norfolk, England. It is located between the village of Great Ryburgh and the market town of Fakenham. In 1931 the parish had a population of 53.

Testerton is one of a clutch of deserted villages and associated churches within a few kilometres of Fakenham.

== History ==
The village's name means 'East farm/settlement'. The initial T- is probably a remnant of Old English 'aet'.

Although mentioned in the Domesday Book, Testerton appears to have decayed during the Medieval period, and by the beginning of the 17th century the parish had only 18 communicants. By the end of that century the parish church of Saint Remigius was already very ruined, and at some point after this time the walls were completely removed.

The only surviving remnant of the medieval village is the church, which retains the western part of the west tower, and is believed to have had a rectangular nave and apsidal chancel. The tower dates to the late 14th or 15th century, though the rest of the church is likely to have dated to the 11th or 12th century.

Apart from the Church of St Remigius, Testerton Hall also presents some architectural interest. The present Grade II Listed house is only the rear service wing of what was once a much larger building, dating to 1802. With two storeys in seven bays, the building is constructed from red brick and has a south facade in the Georgian architecture style.

On 1 April 1935 the parish was abolished and merged with Pudding Norton.
