= Bixley =

Former civil parish in Norfolk, England

Coordinates: 52.603°N 1.329°E

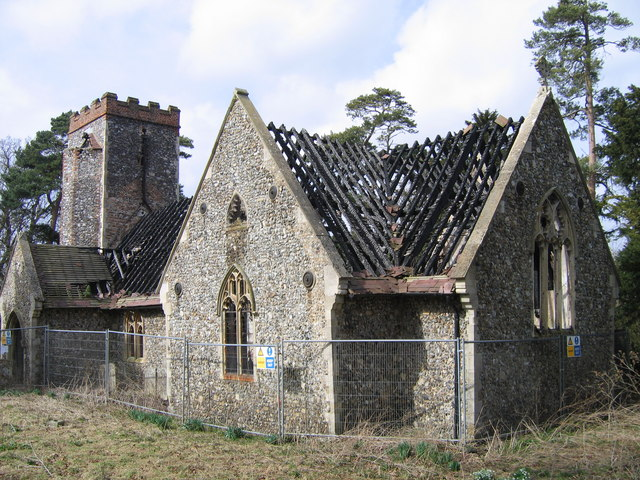
- The former St Wandregesilius church, Bixley

- Location within Norfolk
- Area: 5.42 km^{2} (2.09 sq mi)
- Population: 144 (2001)
  - Density: 27/km^{2} (70/sq mi)
- OS grid reference: TG254059
- Civil parish: Caistor St Edmund and Bixley
- District: South Norfolk
- Shire county: Norfolk
- Region: East
- Country: England
- Sovereign state: United Kingdom
- Post town: NORWICH
- Postcode district: NR14
- Dialling code: 01603
- UK Parliament: South Norfolk

Bixley is a former civil parish, now in the parish of Caistor St Edmund and Bixley, in the South Norfolk district of Norfolk, England. It is 3 miles (4.8 km) south-east of the city of Norwich.

At the 2001 census the parish consisted of 60 households and had a population of 144, including the village of Arminghall. On 1 April 2019 the parish was merged with Caistor St Edmund to form Caistor St Edmund and Bixley.

The origin the name of Bixley is 'clearing in bushy land'. The name of Bixley near Ipswich has the same origin.

The parish church of St Wandregesilius dates from 1272. Wandregesilius is a Latinised form of Wandrille and it is the only church in England dedicated to this 7th-century Frankish abbot. In May 2004 it was set on fire by arsonists and gutted. The church had no electricity and used gas cylinders for heating which it is believed were used by vandals to start the fire. A decision was made to not rebuild the church but to use the money from the insurance claim to support other church in the diocese. Near the church is Bixley medieval settlement, the site of a deserted medieval village.

Sir Timothy Colman lived at Bixley Manor, in the grounds of which is the seven-storey stump of Bixley Tower Mill, dating from 1838. At eleven storeys this was once the tallest windmill in Norfolk and possibly the tallest in Britain. It was reduced to its current height in 1865.
