= Stanford, Norfolk =

Deserted village in Norfolk, England

Coordinates: 52.51848°N 0.7299°E

Stanford
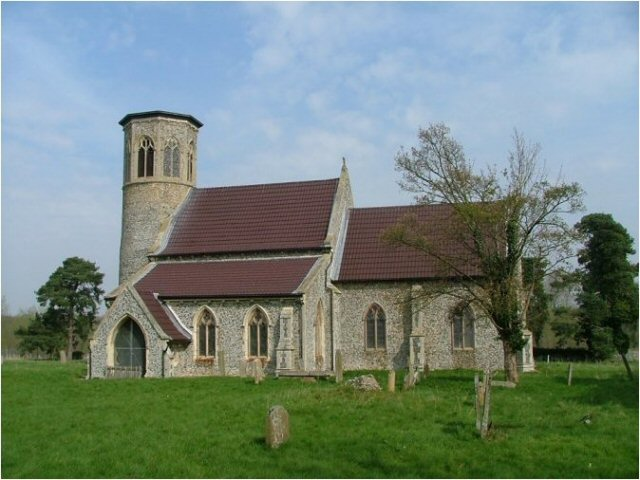
- All Saints, Stanford

- Location within Norfolk
- Area: 13.62 km^{2} (5.26 sq mi)
- Population: 8 (2001 census)
  - Density: 1/km^{2} (2.6/sq mi)
- OS grid reference: TL 853 946
  - London: 91.9 miles (147.9 km)
- Civil parish: Stanford
- District: Breckland
- Shire county: Norfolk
- Region: East
- Country: England
- Sovereign state: United Kingdom
- Post town: THETFORD
- Postcode district: IP24
- Police: Norfolk
- Fire: Norfolk
- Ambulance: East of England

Stanford is a deserted village and civil parish in the English county of Norfolk. It is situated 7 1/2 miles (12 km) north of the town of Thetford and 25 miles (40 km) southwest of the city of Norwich.

The name of the village derives from Old English and means "stony ford".

The village became deserted when it was taken over by the British Army during the Second World War as part of the Stanford Battle Area, an infantry training area that is still in use. The village and most of the parish are within a restricted area and access is not allowed without special permission from the Army.

The parish church of All Saints, like the other surviving churches within the training area, is fitted with blast-proof sheeting to protect the structure, and wire fencing surrounds the church and churchyard to protect from military manoeuvres.

The civil parish has an area of 5.26 mi^{2} (13.6 km^{2}) and in the 2001 census had a population of eight in four households. For the purposes of local government, the parish falls within the district of Breckland. At the 2011 census the population remained less than 100 and was included in the civil parish of Croxton.
