= Sturston, Norfolk =

Deserted village in Norfolk, England

Coordinates: 52.50248°N 0.76839°E

Sturston
- Location within Norfolk
- Area: 7.81 km^{2} (3.02 sq mi)
- Population: 0 (2001 Census)
  - Density: 0/km^{2} (0/sq mi)
- OS grid reference: TL880930
- District: Breckland
- Shire county: Norfolk
- Region: East
- Country: England
- Sovereign state: United Kingdom
- Post town: THETFORD
- Postcode district: IP24
- Police: Norfolk
- Fire: Norfolk
- Ambulance: East of England
- UK Parliament: South West Norfolk

Sturston is a deserted village and civil parish in the English county of Norfolk. It is situated some 7 1/2 miles (12 km) north of the town of Thetford and 30 miles (48 km) south-west of the city of Norwich.

The village became deserted when it was taken over by the British Army during the Second World War as part of the Stanford Battle Area, an infantry training area that is still in use today. The village and most of the parish are within a prohibited area and access is not allowed without special permission from the Army.

The civil parish has an area of 7.81 km^{2} (3.02 sq mi) and in the 2001 census had no inhabitants. For the purposes of local government, the parish falls within the district of Breckland.
