= Crostwick =

Village in Norfolk, England

Coordinates: 52.69724°N 1.34011°E

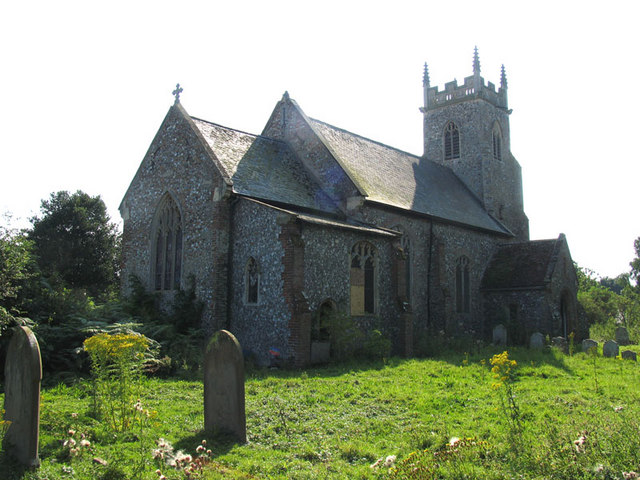
- St. Peter's Church

- Location within Norfolk
- Area: 2.82 km^{2} (1.09 sq mi)
- OS grid reference: TG257162
  - London: 165km
- Civil parish: Crostwick
- District: Broadland
- Shire county: Norfolk
- Region: East
- Country: England
- Sovereign state: United Kingdom
- Post town: NORWICH
- Postcode district: NR12
- Dialling code: 01603
- Police: Norfolk
- Fire: Norfolk
- Ambulance: East of England
- UK Parliament: Broadland and Fakenham

Crostwick is a village in the English county of Norfolk. The village is part of the civil parish of Horstead with Stanninghall.

Crostwick is located 2.6 miles (4.2 km) west of Wroxham and 5.6 miles (9.0 km) north of Norwich.

== History ==
Crostwick's name is of Viking origin and derives from the Old Norse for a clearing around a cross.

In the Domesday Book, Crostwick is listed as a settlement of 14 households in the hundred of Taverham. In 1086, the village was divided between the estates of Ralph de Beaufour and Roger de Poitou.

During the Second World War, parts of Crostwick were turned into a decoy airfield to distract the Luftwaffe from the target of RAF Horsham St Faith.

== Geography ==
The village is bisected by the B1150, between Norwich and North Walsham.

== St. Peter's Church ==
Crostwick's parish church is dedicated to Saint Peter and dates from the Fifteenth Century. St. Peter's is located on North Walsham Road and has been Grade I listed since 1984.

St. Peter's was restored in the Victorian era but still boasts a medieval wall-painting of Saint Christopher and an elaborately carved font dating from the Nineteenth Century. The church also features stained-glass windows designed by William Wailes which was restored by J & J King.

== Governance ==
Coltishall is part of the electoral ward of Coltishall for local elections and is part of the district of Broadland.

The village's national constituency is Broadland and Fakenham which has been represented by the Conservative Party's Jerome Mayhew MP since 2019.

== War memorial ==
Crostwick War Memorial stands on the North Walsham Road and is a plinth with a wheel-cross. The memorial lists the following names for the First World War:

Rank	Name	Unit	Date of death	Burial/Commemoration
Cpl.	Walter J. Sandy	5th Bn., Machine Gun Corps	2 Sep. 1918	Vis-en-Artois Cemetery
Cpl.	Robert J. Parfitt MM	8th Bn., Suffolk Regiment	31 Jul. 1917	Menin Gate
Pte.	John D. Patterson	4th (Mounted) Bn., CEF	14 Jun. 1917	La Targette Cemetery
Pte.	Frederick A. Thaxton	7th Bn., Norfolk Regiment	12 Aug. 1916	Thiepval Memorial
Pte.	Frederick J. Goffin	12th Bn., Norfolk Regt.	11 Sep. 1918	Strand Cemetery
Pte.	Henry J. Holmes	1/4th Bn., Northumberland Fusiliers	24 Apr. 1917	Arras Memorial

And, the following for the Second World War:

Rank	Name	Unit	Date of death	Burial/Commemoration
PO	Claude R. Goymer	HMS Patroclus	3 Nov. 1940	Portsmouth Naval Memorial
Pte.	Walter E. Dix	Queen's Own West Kent Regiment	15 Sep. 1944	Gradara War Cemetery
