= Arminghall =

Village in Norfolk, England

Coordinates: 52.590°N 1.323°E

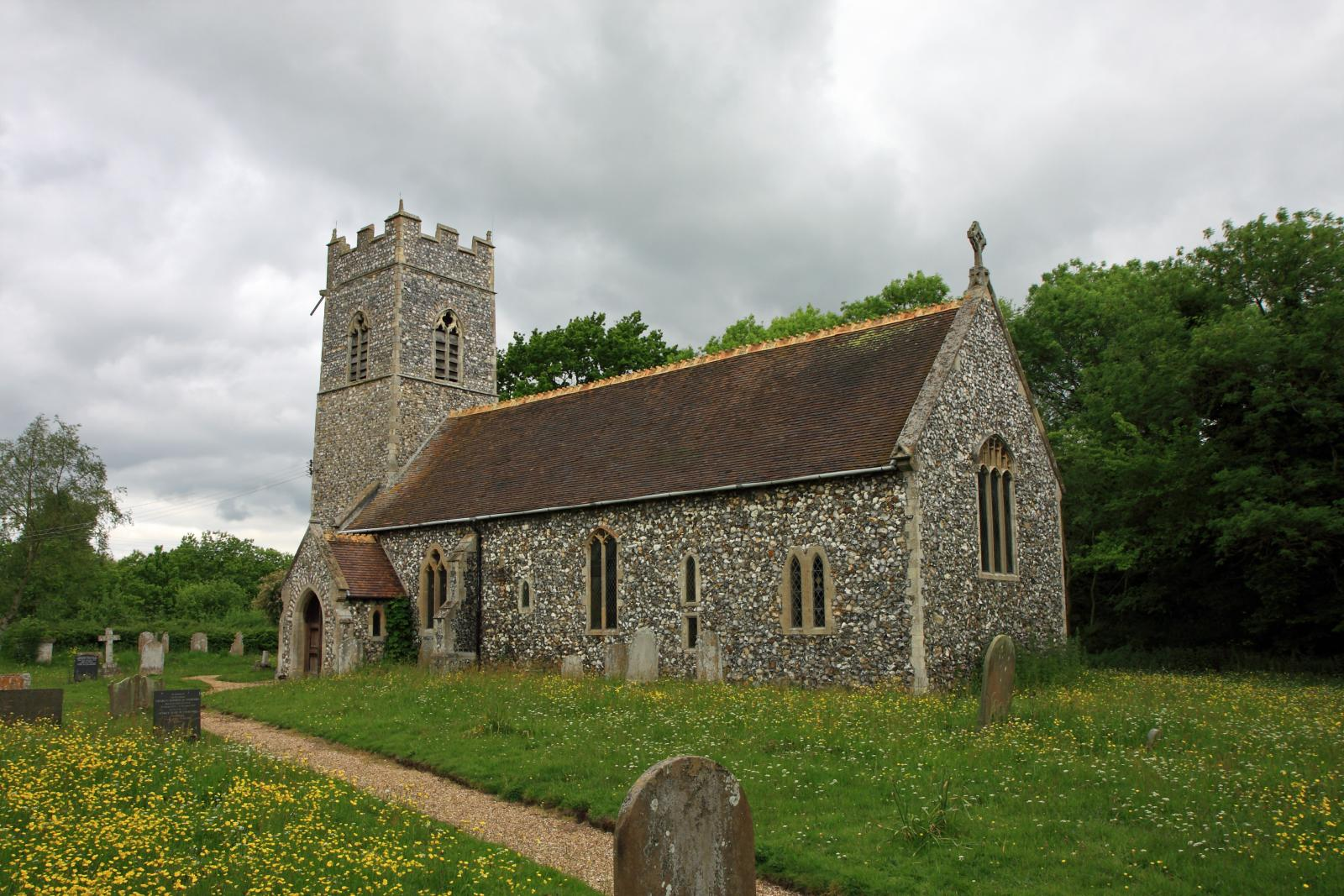
- St Mary's Church

- Location within Norfolk
- Civil parish: Caistor St Edmund and Bixley
- District: South Norfolk
- Shire county: Norfolk
- Region: East
- Country: England
- Sovereign state: United Kingdom
- Post town: Norwich
- Postcode district: NR14
- Dialling code: 01508
- UK Parliament: South Norfolk

Arminghall is a village and former civil parish, now in the parish of Caistor St Edmund and Bixley, in the South Norfolk district, in the county of Norfolk, England. It is around 3 miles (4.8 km) southeast of Norwich. Most of the houses in the village are located close to the church, which lies just west of the B1332 road from Norwich to Poringland. Syfer Technology, an electronic components manufacturer, is based at Old Stoke Road, close to the River Tas. In 1931 the parish had a population of 108.

== History ==
The name 'Arminghall' means 'Nook of land of Ambre's/Eanmaer's people'. The exact form of the personal name is uncertain. Arminghall was recorded in the Domesday Book as Hameringahala. On 1 April 1935 the parish was abolished and merged with Bixley. In 2019 Bixley parish was abolished to form "Caistor St Edmund and Bixley".

== Arminghall Henge ==
In 1929 a prehistoric timber circle and henge monument site was discovered 1 1/2 miles (2.4 km) north-west of Arminghall village by Gilbert Insall who had been taking aerial photographs of the area in search of new archaeological sites. Whilst flying at around 2,000 feet (610 m) he noticed cropmarks of a circular enclosure made of two concentric rings with a horseshoe of eight pit-like markings within it. The entire site was around 75 metres (246 ft) in diameter.

The site was visited a week later by O.G.S. Crawford, who pronounced it to be the Norwich Woodhenge but it was not until 1935 that it was first excavated, by Grahame Clark. His work established that two circular rings were ditches, the outer one 1.5 metres (4.9 ft) deep and the inner one 2.3 metres (7.5 ft) deep, with indications of a bank that once stood between them. The pits in the middle were postholes for timbers that would have been almost 1 m in diameter. The site dates to the Neolithic, with a radiocarbon date of 3650-2650 Cal BC (4440±150) from charcoal from a post-pit. The henge is orientated on the mid-winter sunset, which, when viewed from the henge, sets down the slope of nearby high ground, Chapel Hill.
