= Quarles, Norfolk =

Hamlet in Norfolk, England

Coordinates: 52.913012°N 0.798424°E

Quarles
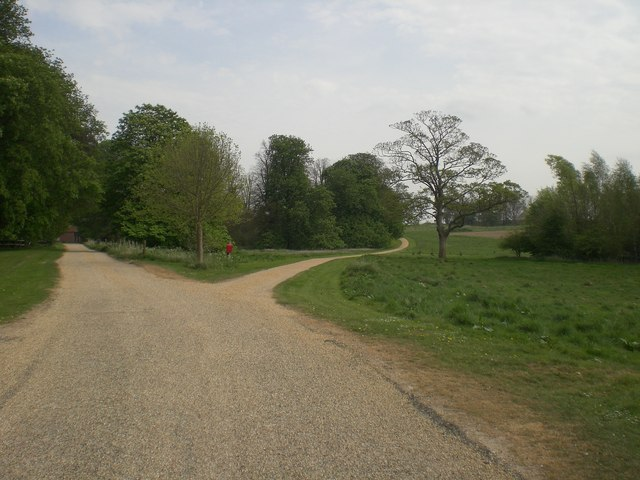
- Entrance to the hamlet of Quarles in Norfolk

- Location within Norfolk
- OS grid reference: TF883387
  - London: 122 miles (196 km)
- Civil parish: Holkham
- District: North Norfolk
- Shire county: Norfolk
- Region: East
- Country: England
- Sovereign state: United Kingdom
- Post town: WELLS-NEXT-THE-SEA
- Postcode district: NR23
- Dialling code: 01328
- Police: Norfolk
- Fire: Norfolk
- Ambulance: East of England

Quarles is a hamlet and former civil parish, now in the civil parish of Holkham, in the North Norfolk district, in the county of Norfolk, England. The hamlet is 4 miles (6.4 km) south-west of Wells-next-the-Sea, 34 miles (55 km) north-west of Norwich and 122 miles (196 km) north-north-east of London. The nearest railway station is Sheringham for the Bittern Line which runs between Sheringham, Cromer and Norwich. The nearest airport is Norwich International Airport. The hamlet is just south of the Holkham Estate and consists of six houses and one farm. In 1931 the civil parish had a population of 38.

== History ==
Quarles has an entry in the Domesday Book of 1085. In the great book Quarles is recorded by the names Gueruelei, and Huerueles, the genitive form of a personal name, i.e. "[The place] of Gueruel/Hueruel". The manor was Kings Land and the main landholder was Roger Bigot; his main tenant was Thurston Fitzguy.

The village is attested from the 1175 Norfolk Feet of Fines manuscript as "Warfles".

Quarles was formerly an extra-parochial tract, from 1858 Quarles was a civil parish in its own right, on 1 April 1935 the parish was abolished and merged with Great Walsingham, it was transferred to Holkham in 1947.
