= Nomina Villarum =

Survey in 1316

Nomina Villarum was a survey carried out in 1316 and contains a list of all cities, boroughs and townships in England and the Lords of them. The document was compiled for King Edward II. The survey was a feudal aid, a payment which by tradition the king could demand from his tenants to finance the knighting of his eldest son or the marriage of his eldest daughter and was in effect, a taxation on land.

The name of the document is mediaeval Latin for "Names of towns" — villa, originally meaning a country house, later developed the meaning "town" or "small city".
