= Stanford Training Area =

British military training ground

- Stanford, Norfolk
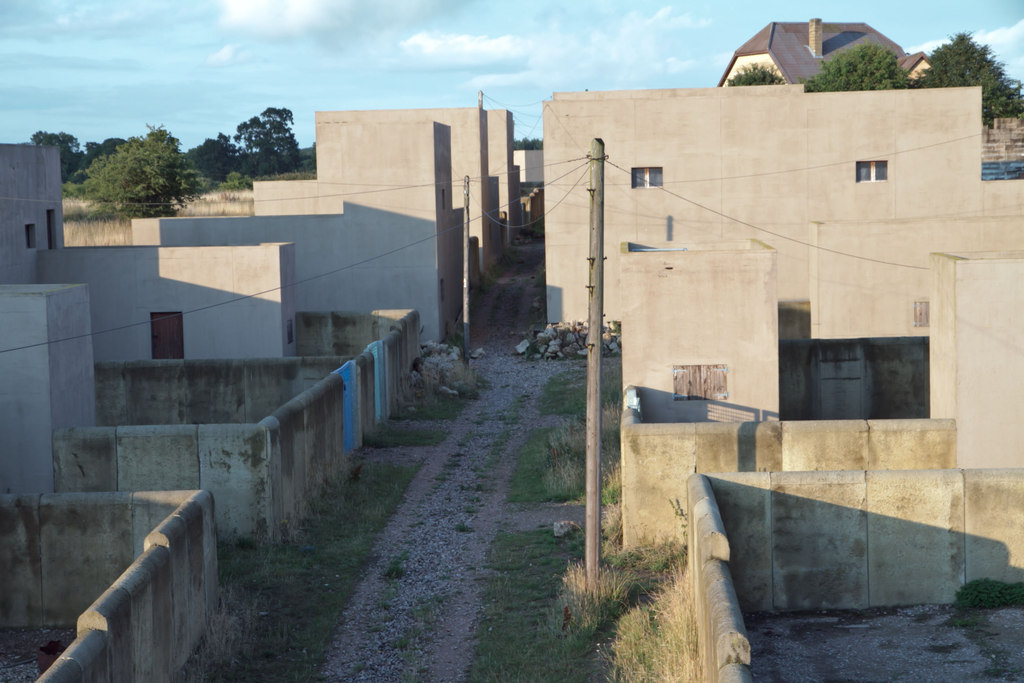
- Urban training compound on STANTA.

Site information
- Type: Training Area
- Owner: Ministry of Defence
- Controlled by: British Army

Location
- Location within Norfolk
- Coordinates: 52.52078°N 0.75480°E

Site history
- Built: 1942
- Built for: War Office
- In use: 1942–present

The Stanford Training Area (STANTA), originally known as the Stanford Battle Area, is a British Army training area in the English county of Norfolk. The area is approximately 30,000 acres (120 km^{2}; 47 sq mi) in size; it is some 7 miles (11 km) north of the town of Thetford, 25 miles (40 km) south-southeast of the port town of King's Lynn, and approximately 36 miles (58 km) south-west of the city of Norwich.

== History ==
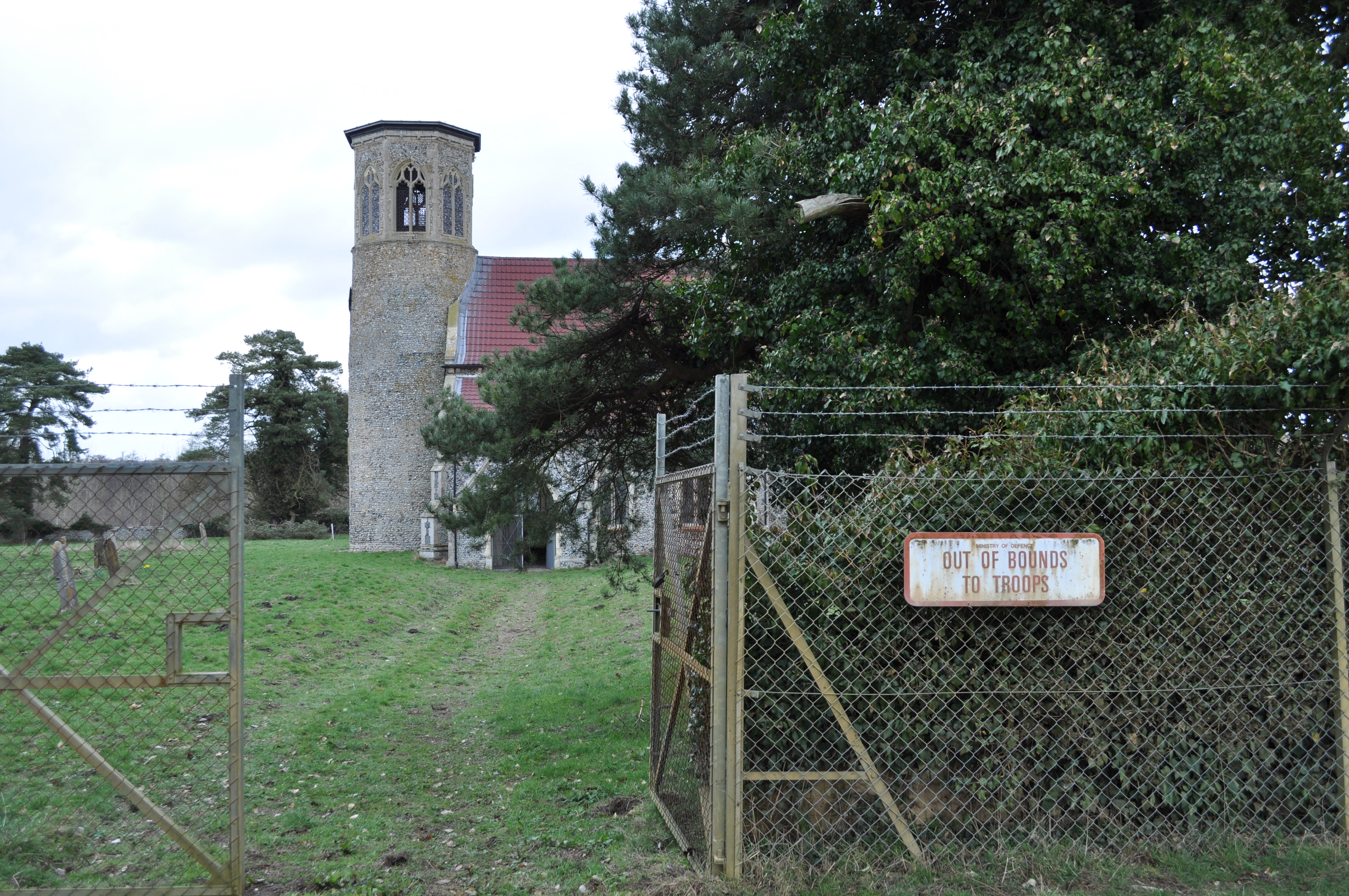
All Saints Church, Stanford.

The site was established in 1942, when a battle training area was required, and a "Nazi village" was built. Military exercises were already known in the area; tanks had deployed to Thetford in the First World War. The complete takeover involved the evacuation of the villages of Buckenham Tofts, Langford, Stanford, Sturston, Tottington and West Tofts.

The area was used during the run-up to the D-Day invasion and since then has hosted many exercises. In 2009 a 12.5-acre (51,000 m^{2}) village designed to replicate its Afghan equivalent was added to the Training Area for the training of troops deployed in support of the War in Afghanistan. The site, built at a cost of £14 million, is populated by Afghan nationals, ex-Gurkha soldiers and amputee actors, who simulate the Afghan National Army, locals and wounded soldiers. The village includes houses, a market and a mosque. It also features a system that pumps out smells like rotten meat and sewage.

The Battle Area was used in the filming of many of the episodes of the comedy series Dad's Army.

The Swedish Crown Princess Victoria and Prince Daniel visited STANTA, where Swedish military instructors were delivering training to Ukrainian soldiers, in November 2023.

== Current use ==
The British Army, alongside allied nations such as Canada, Australia, Denmark, Finland, Kosovo, Sweden, New Zealand, The Netherlands, Lithuania, Norway and Romania have been utilising STANTA as part of Operation Interflex, the UK's mission to deliver basic and leadership training to the Armed Forces of Ukraine, following Russia's invasion in 2022. In April 2024, the Royal Anglian Regiment were continuing to deliver three courses at STANTA; Platoon Commanders, Platoon Sergeants and Section Commanders Battle Courses. Ukrainian troops are taught how to deal with complex scenarios involving trench warfare, close quarters fighting, drones and mines.

== Facilities ==
The battle area includes four historic churches; the one at West Tofts was restored by Pugin and a new church building forms part of the purpose-built village of Eastmere, built to give soldiers experience of fighting on the northern European plains. There is a short landing strip at 52.541422°N 0.701805°E.

It was announced in mid 2023 that "trench facilities located close to the perimeter of the Urban Training Facility, consisting of pre-cast concrete ducts/channels forming linear T-shaped trenches, with a mixture of pre-cast and cast in-situ structures" were to be constructed and completed by June 2024.

== Sources ==
- Ordnance Survey (1999). OS Explorer Map 229 - Thetford in the Brecks. ISBN 0-319-21861-9.
- NorfolkChurches.co.uk. "Norfolk battle training area churches". Retrieved February 17, 2006.
- Telegraph. An Afghan village has been built by the Ministry of Defence in Thetford, Norfolk. Retrieved May 12, 2009.
