= Thetford Rural District =

Former local government area in the UK

Coordinates: 52.48°N 0.67°E

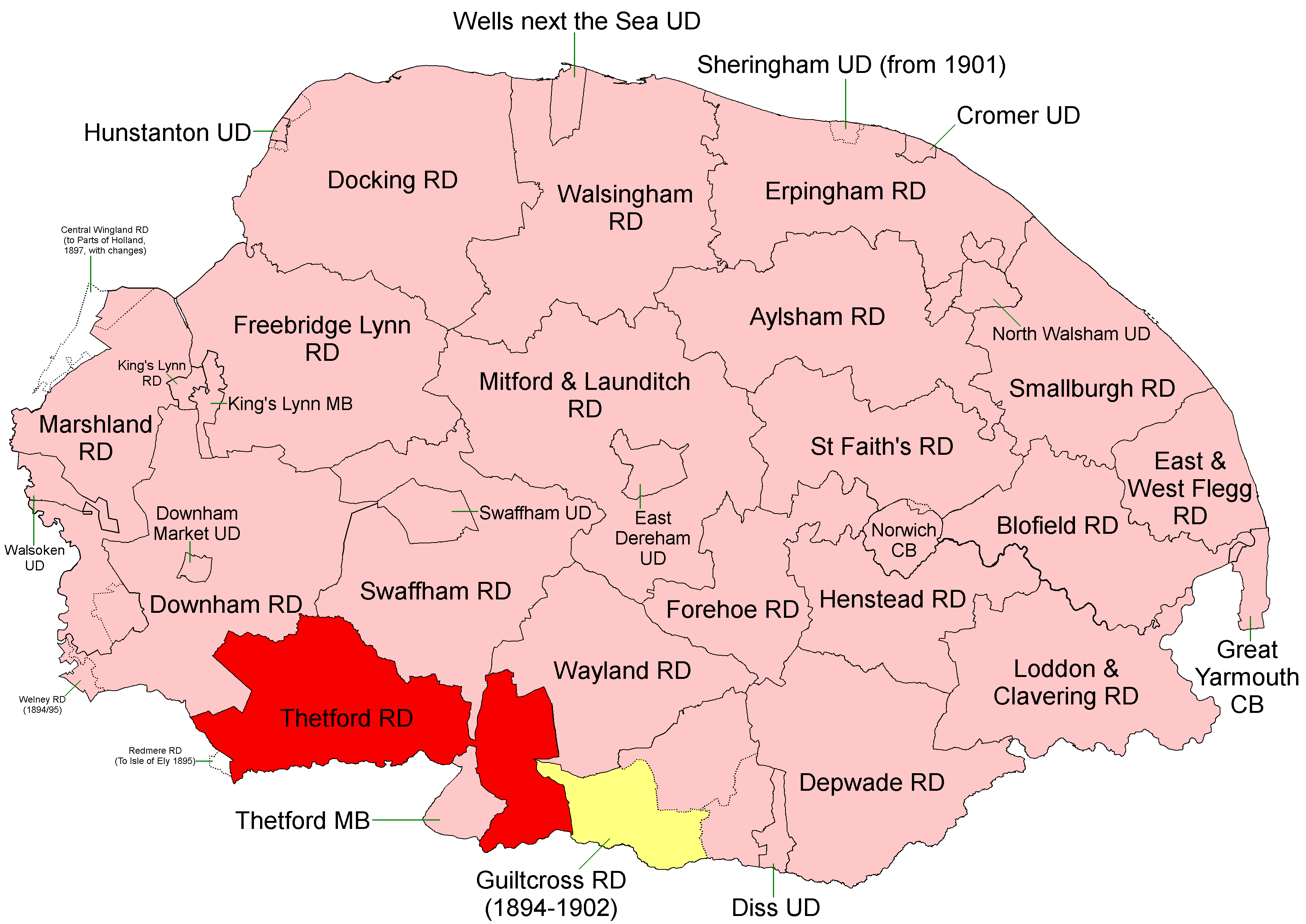
Boundaries in 1894. 1902 extension in yellow

Thetford Rural District was a rural district in Norfolk, England from 1894 to 1935.

It was formed under the Local Government Act 1894 based on the Thetford rural sanitary district. It covered the lands which were in Norfolk and lay to the north and east of Thetford Municipal Borough.

In 1902 it took in the western part of the disbanded Guiltcross Rural District,.

In 1935, Thetford RD was abolished and its territory divided between Downham, Swaffham and Wayland RDs.

== Statistics ==
Year	Area (ha)	Population	Density (pop/ha)
1911	38,799	14,425	0.37
1921	38,799	13,121	0.34
1931	38,799	13,150	0.34

== Parishes ==
Parish	From	To	Notes
Blo' Norton	1902		Formerly Guiltcross RD. To Wayland RD
Brandon	1902		Formerly Guiltcross RD. To Wayland RD
Brettenham			To Wayland RD
Bridgham	1902		Formerly Guiltcross RD. To Wayland RD
Cranwich			To Swaffham RD
Croxton			To Wayland RD
East Harling	1902		Formerly Guiltcross RD.
East Wretham	1902		To Wayland RD
Feltwell			To Downham RD
Feltwell Anchor		1929	Added to Feltwell
Garboldisham	1902		Formerly Guiltcross RD. To Wayland RD
Gasthorpe	1902		Formerly Guiltcross RD.
Great and Little Snarehill			To Wayland RD (with Brettenham)
Hockwold cum Wilton			To Downham RD
Kilverstone			To Wayland RD
Lynford			To Swaffham RD
Methwold			To Downham RD
Mundford			To Swaffham RD
North Lopham	1902		Formerly Guiltcross RD. To Wayland RD
Northwold			To Downham RD
Riddlesworth	1902		Formerly Guiltcross RD. To Wayland RD
Rushford			To Wayland RD (with Brettenham)
Santon			To Swaffham RD
South Lopham	1902		Formerly Guiltcross RD. To Wayland RD
Sturston			To Swaffham RD
Weeting with Broomhill			To Swaffham RD
West Harling	1902		Formerly Guiltcross RD.
West Tofts			To Swaffham RD
West Wretham			To Wayland RD
