= Cranwich =

Village in Norfolk, England

Coordinates: 52.5217°N 0.6244°E

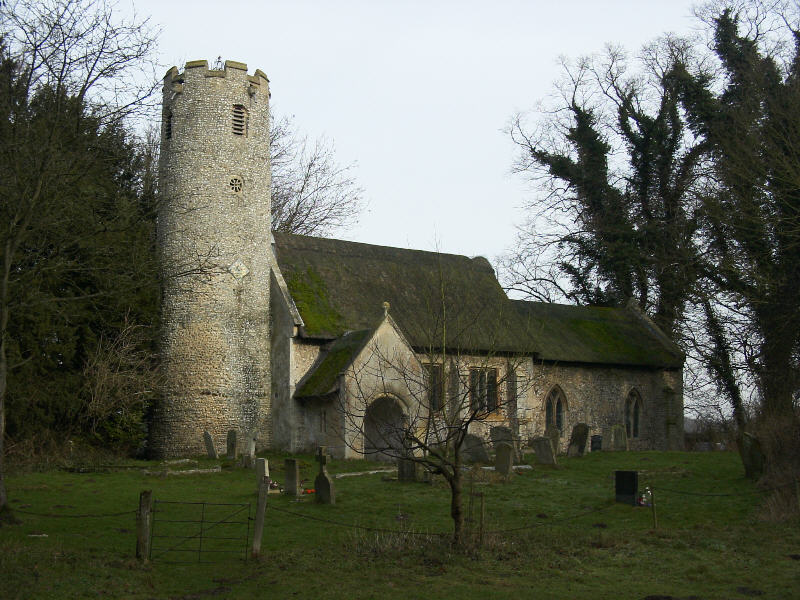
- St. Mary's Church

- Location within Norfolk
- Area: 7.38 km^{2} (2.85 sq mi)
- OS grid reference: TL781947
- Civil parish: Cranwich
- District: Breckland
- Shire county: Norfolk
- Region: East
- Country: England
- Sovereign state: United Kingdom
- Post town: THETFORD
- Postcode district: IP26
- Dialling code: 01842
- Police: Norfolk
- Fire: Norfolk
- Ambulance: East of England
- UK Parliament: South West Norfolk

Cranwich is a village and civil parish in Norfolk, England.

Cranwich is located 8.6 miles (13.8 km) north-west of Thetford and 29 miles (47 km) west of Norwich.

== History ==
Cranwich's name is of Anglo-Saxon origin and derives from the Old English for 'a marsh with cranes or herons.'

In the Domesday Book, Cranwich is listed as a settlement of 36 households in the hundred of Grimshoe. In 1086, the village formed part of the estates of William de Warenne.

In 1935, a labour camp was established in Cranwich by the Ministry of Labour for unemployed men. The camp gave manual work in forestry and quarrying and was closed at the onset of the Second World War, where it was used by the British Army.

=== 1978 F-111 crash ===
On Wednesday 29 March 1978 at 4.40pm General Dynamics F-111 Aardvark '73-0717' of the 495th Tactical Fighter Squadron at RAF Lakenheath crashed, when two F-111 aircraft were both hit by lightning, with both pilots of one F-111 aircraft killed. The aircraft landed in woodland. The other F-111 aircraft landed safely.

The fire engines arrived from Methwold, Thetford and Brandon.

- Captain Charles H. Kitchell, pilot, aged 29, with wife Jane, from Larchmont, New York, and six year old son Christian
- 1st Lt Jeffery Moore, WSO, aged 25 from Pittsburgh in Pennsylvania, with wife Marjorie, and two year old daughter Kristina

== Geography ==
In the 2011 Census, Cranwich's population is measured as a civil parish and therefore in the same survey as Ickburgh. The combined population of Ickburgh and Cranwich in 2011 was recorded as 309 residents living in 161 households.

Cranwich is located close to Watermill Broad and the course of the River Wissey. The A134, between King's Lynn and Colchester, runs through the village.

== St. Mary's Church ==
Cranwich's parish church is dedicated to Saint Mary and is one of Norfolk's 124 round-tower churches, dating from the 11th century. St. Mary's is located just off Cranwich Road and has been Grade I listed since 1960.

St. Mary's tower is one of the oldest in Norfolk, but the rest of the building is later. The church was restored in a simple fashion in the Victorian era.

== In popular culture ==
Cranwich is the setting for the 2009 horror-comedy film Lesbian Vampire Killers, with the village renamed Cragwich in the film.

== Governance ==
Cranwich is part of the electoral ward of Bedingfield for local elections and is part of the district of Breckland.

Cranwich is located in the constituency of South West Norfolk, which has been represented by Terry Jermy of the Labour Party since 2024.

== War memorial ==
Cranwich's war memorial is located in Mundford and is a stone memorial topped with a metal cross, which also lists the fallen for Mundford, Lynford and West Tofts. The memorial lists the following from the First World War:

Rank	Name	Unit	Date of death	Burial
Pte.	Herbert Nickolls	1st Bn., Norfolk Regiment	13 May 1917	Mont-Huon Military Cemetery
Pte.	Reginald T. Boldry	1/4th Bn., Norfolk Regt.	17 Aug. 1916	Cairo War Cemetery
Pte.	Henry P. Long	1/4th Bn., Norfolk Regt.	19 Apr. 1917	Jerusalem Memorial
Pte.	John V. Crook	9th Bn., Norfolk Regt.	30 Sep. 1916	St. Sever Cemetery
