= Micro-Mousterian =

Palaeolithic industry

The Micro-Mousterian or Micromousterian is a name given by Alfred Rust and Henri Fleisch to a Palaeolithic industry of small stone tools.

It was found at level five of Ksar Akil in Lebanon. It has also been found in Montenegro, Italy, France, Africa and Syria and is similar to another tiny sized Mousterian industry called the Pontinian.
