= Guiltcross Rural District =

Rural district in Norfolk, England from 1894 to 1902

Coordinates: 52.43°N 0.99°E

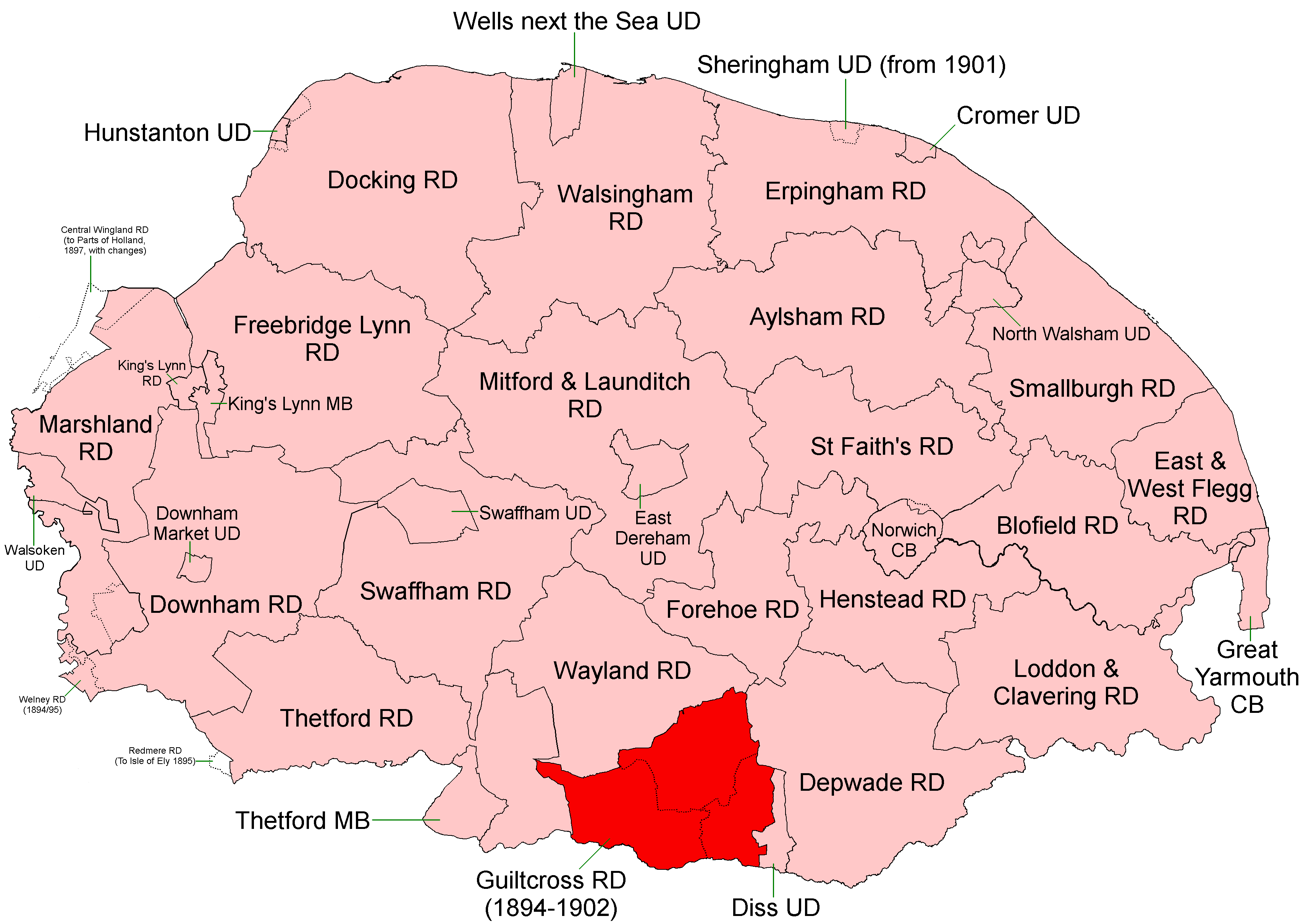
Boundaries in 1894.

Guiltcross Rural District was a rural district in Norfolk, England from 1894 to 1902.

It was formed under the Local Government Act 1894 based on the Guiltcross rural sanitary district. It lay in the southern part of the county between Thetford and Diss and took its name from the ancient Guiltcross hundred.

In 1902, Guiltcross RD was abolished and its territory divided between Thetford, Wayland and Depwade RDs.

== Parishes & Statistics ==
Population figures from 1901 census via Vision of Britain.

Parish	Area (ha)	Population	Notes
Banham	1,616	987	To Wayland RD
Blo' Norton	462	236	To Thetford RD
Bressingham	980	482	To Depwade RD
Bridgham	1,106	255	To Thetford RD
East Harling	1,057	1,031	To Thetford RD
Fersfield	565	219	To Depwade RD
Garboldisham	1,116	559	To Thetford RD
Gasthorpe	352	71	To Thetford RD
Kenninghall	1,485	976	To Wayland RD
New Buckenham	146	516	To Wayland RD
North Lopham	817	600	To Thetford RD
Old Buckenham	2,033	1,005	To Wayland RD
Quidenham	718	198	To Wayland RD
Riddlesworth	472	75	To Thetford RD
Roydon	462	667	To Depwade RD
Shelfanger	698	307	To Depwade RD
South Lopham	791	449	To Thetford RD
West Harling	1,261	101	To Thetford RD
Wilby	575	95	To Wayland RD
Winfarthing	1,081	461	To Depwade RD
Total	17,793	9,290	Density 0.52 / ha
