= Le Moustier =

Archaeological locale and type site of the Mousterian culture in south-western France

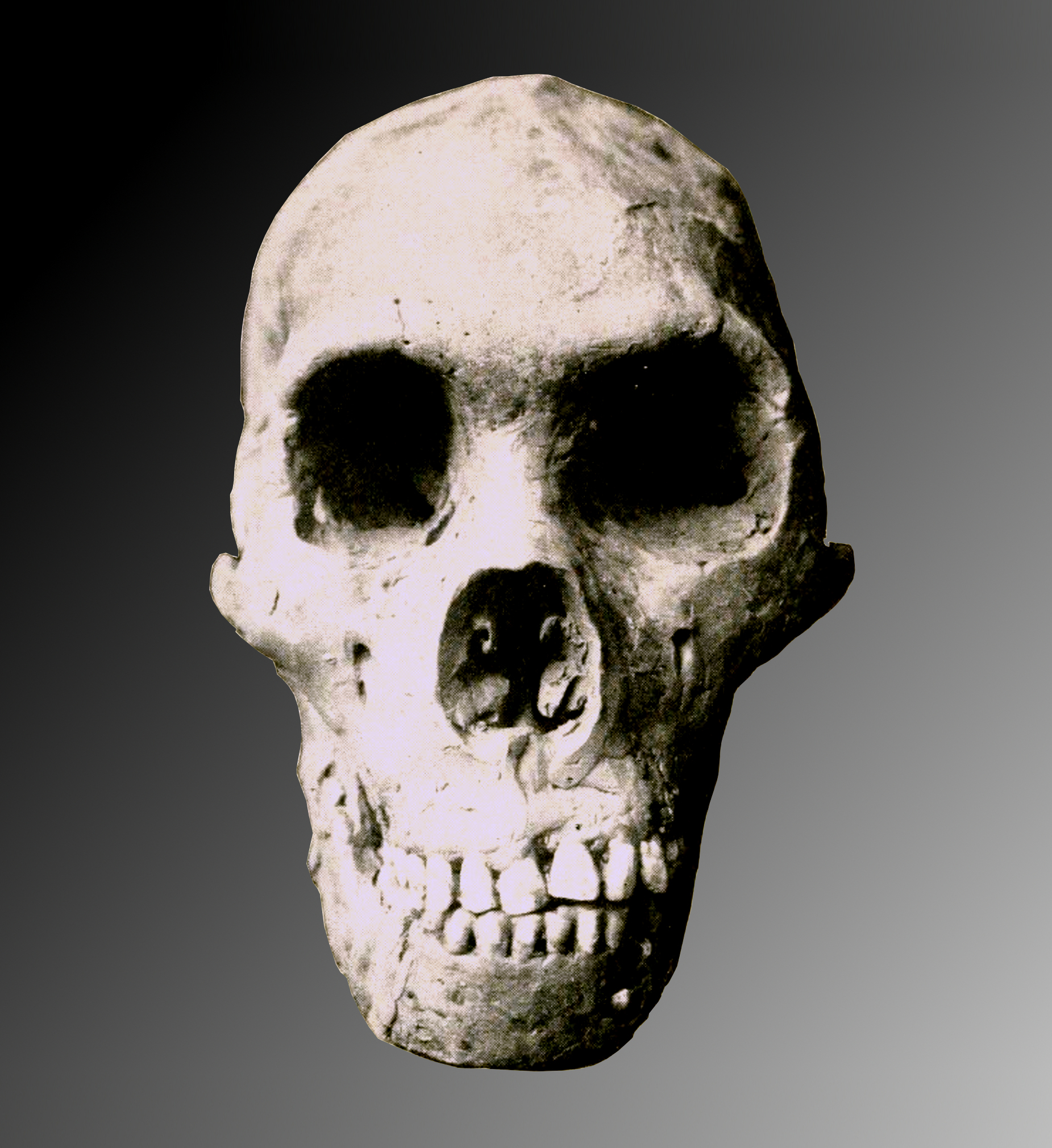
- Le Moustier 1 in 1909, before World War II bombing

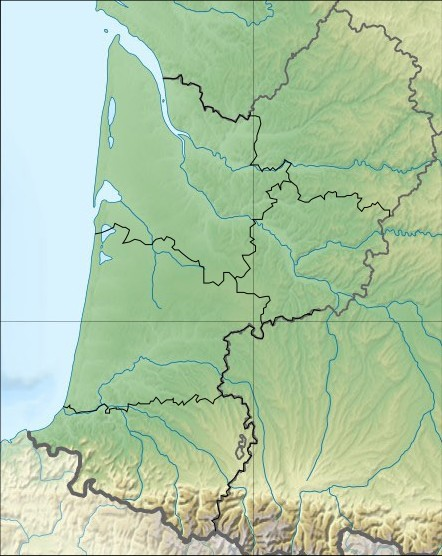
- Location in France Le Moustier (Aquitaine) Le Moustier (Europe)
- 44°59′38″N 1°3′36″E
- Location: Peyzac-le-Moustier
- Region: Dordogne, France

Site notes
- Excavation dates: 1863
- Archaeologists: Henry Christy, Édouard Lartet.

UNESCO World Heritage Site
- Part of: Prehistoric Sites and Decorated Caves of the Vézère Valley
- Criteria: Cultural: (i), (iii)
- Reference: 85-014
- Inscription: 1979 (3rd Session)
- Area: 0.227 ha (24,400 sq ft)

Le Moustier is an archaeological site consisting of two rock shelters in Peyzac-le-Moustier, a village in the Dordogne, France. It is known for a complete skeleton of the species Homo neanderthalensis that was discovered in 1908. The Mousterian tool culture is named after Le Moustier, which was first excavated from 1863 by the Englishman Henry Christy and the Frenchman Édouard Lartet. In 1979, Le Moustier was inscribed on the UNESCO World Heritage List along with other nearby archaeological sites as part of the Prehistoric Sites and Decorated Caves of the Vézère Valley.

== Skeleton ==
The skeleton known as "Le Moustier" is estimated to be approximately 45,000 years old. The characteristics of its skull include a large nasal cavity and a somewhat less developed brow ridge and occipital bun, as might be expected in a juvenile.

After discovery, the skull was dismantled, cast and reconstructed at least four times. During this process, the skull received considerable amounts of damage; for example, after it was sold to the Ethnological Museum of Berlin, a dentist broke the alveolar bone to access the teeth. It was later damaged in the Allied bombing of Berlin during the Second World War, then looted by the Soviet Union, which returned the remains of the skull to the German Democratic Republic in 1958. The skull is now missing many parts, the teeth glued into the wrong position, and it has been dipped into glue, covered with varnish, and painted with plaster. Consequently, its scientific value is much reduced.

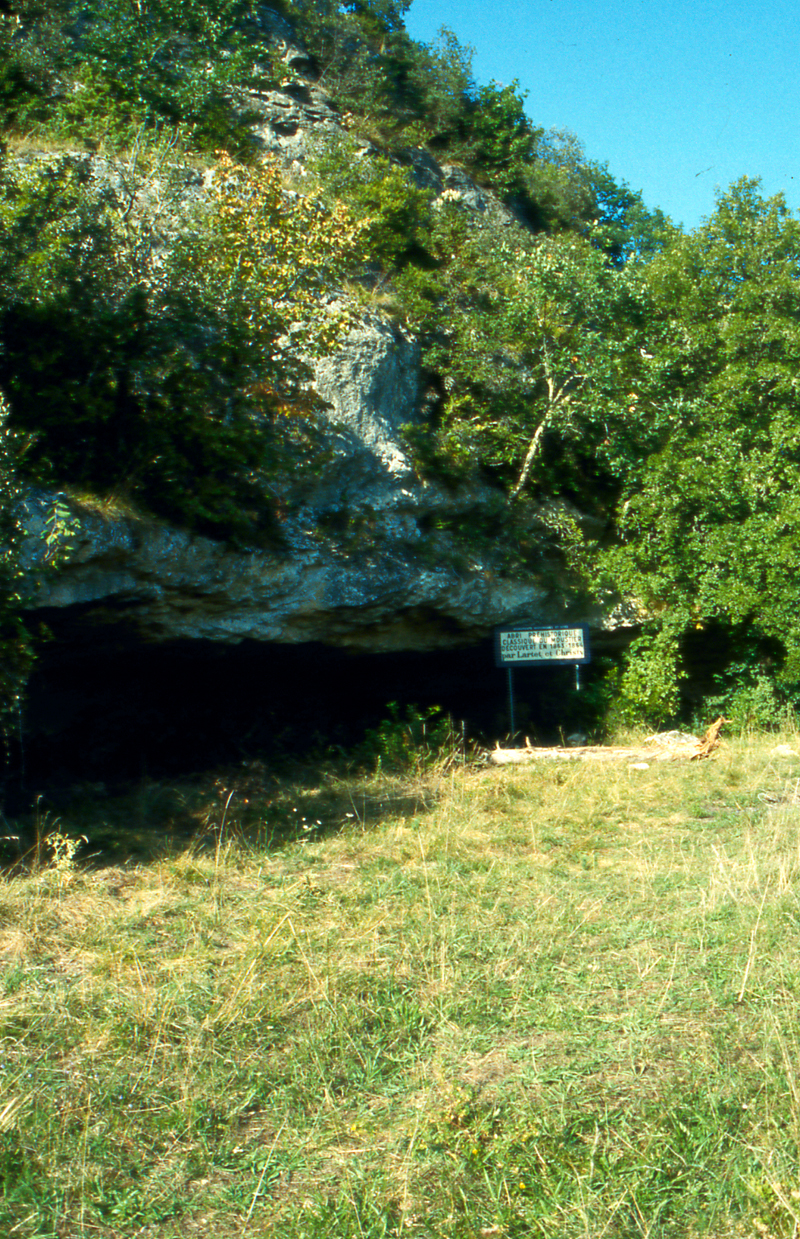
Upper shelter

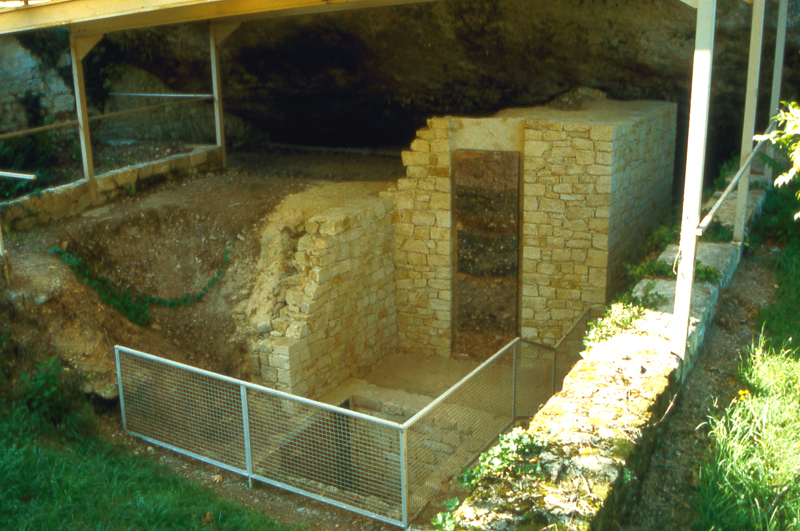
Lower shelter

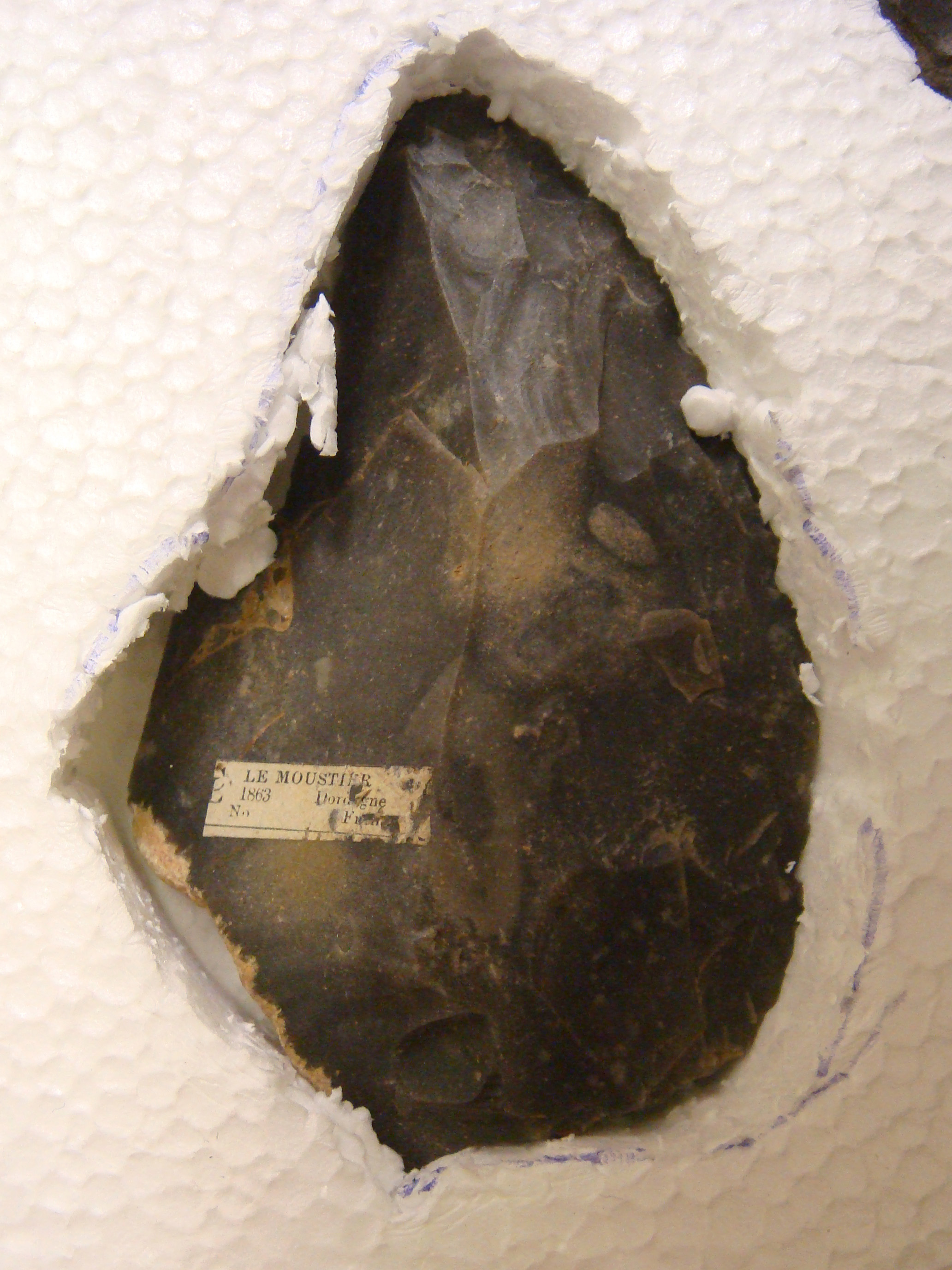
Flint handaxe, excavated 1863, British Museum

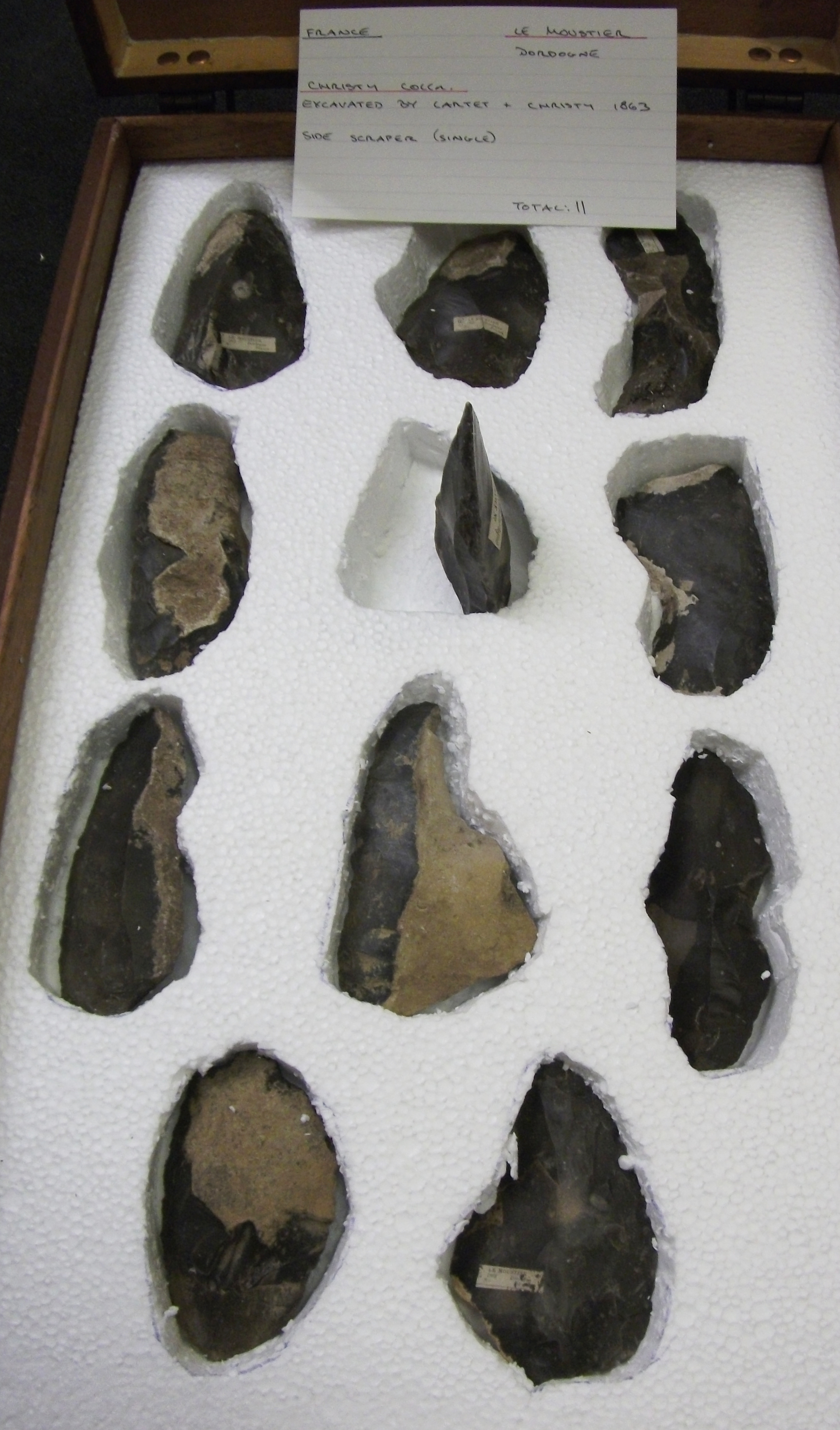
A box of side scrapers excavated by Lartet and Christy

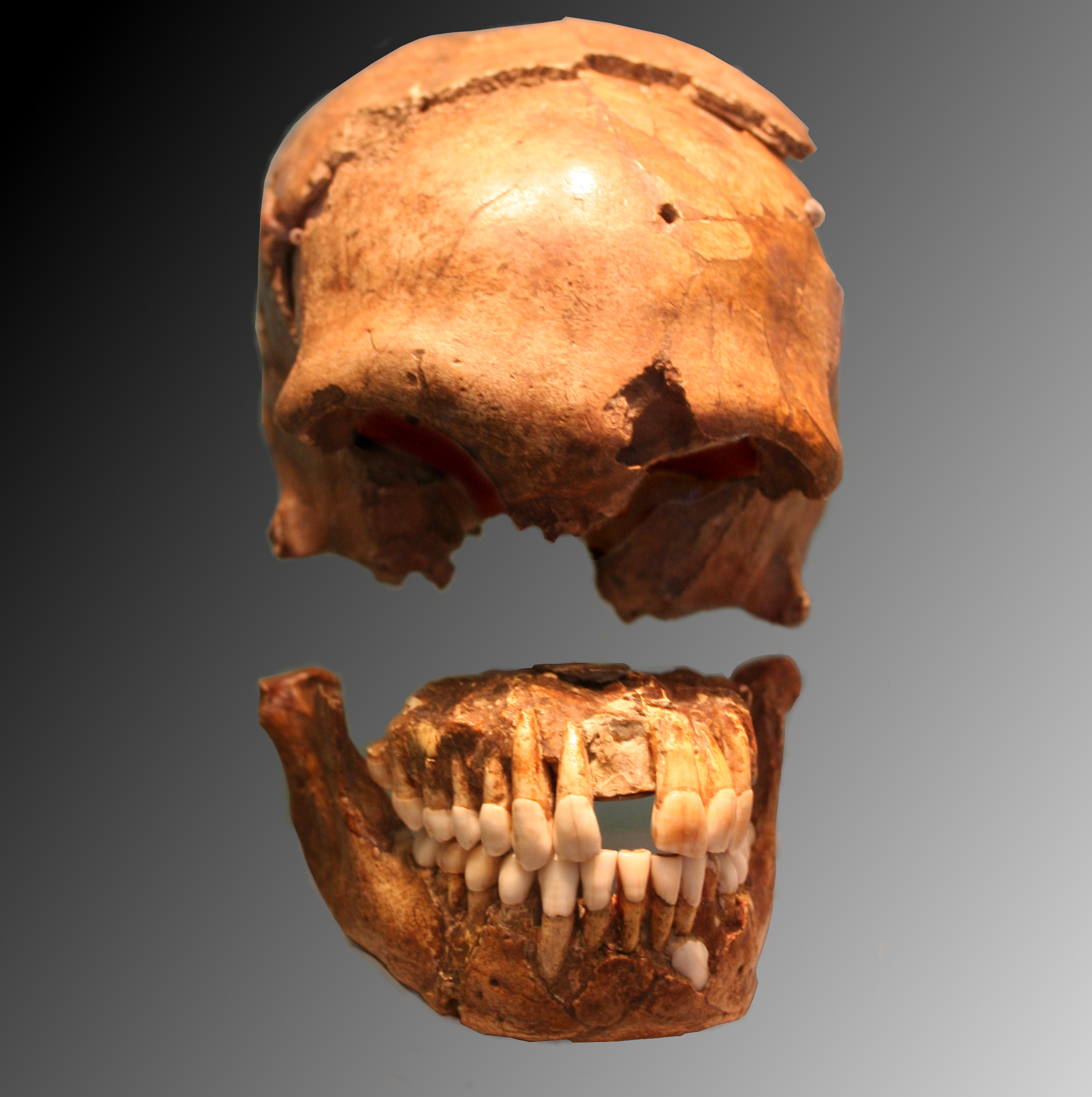
Le Moustier 1 skull today in Neues Museum Berlin.

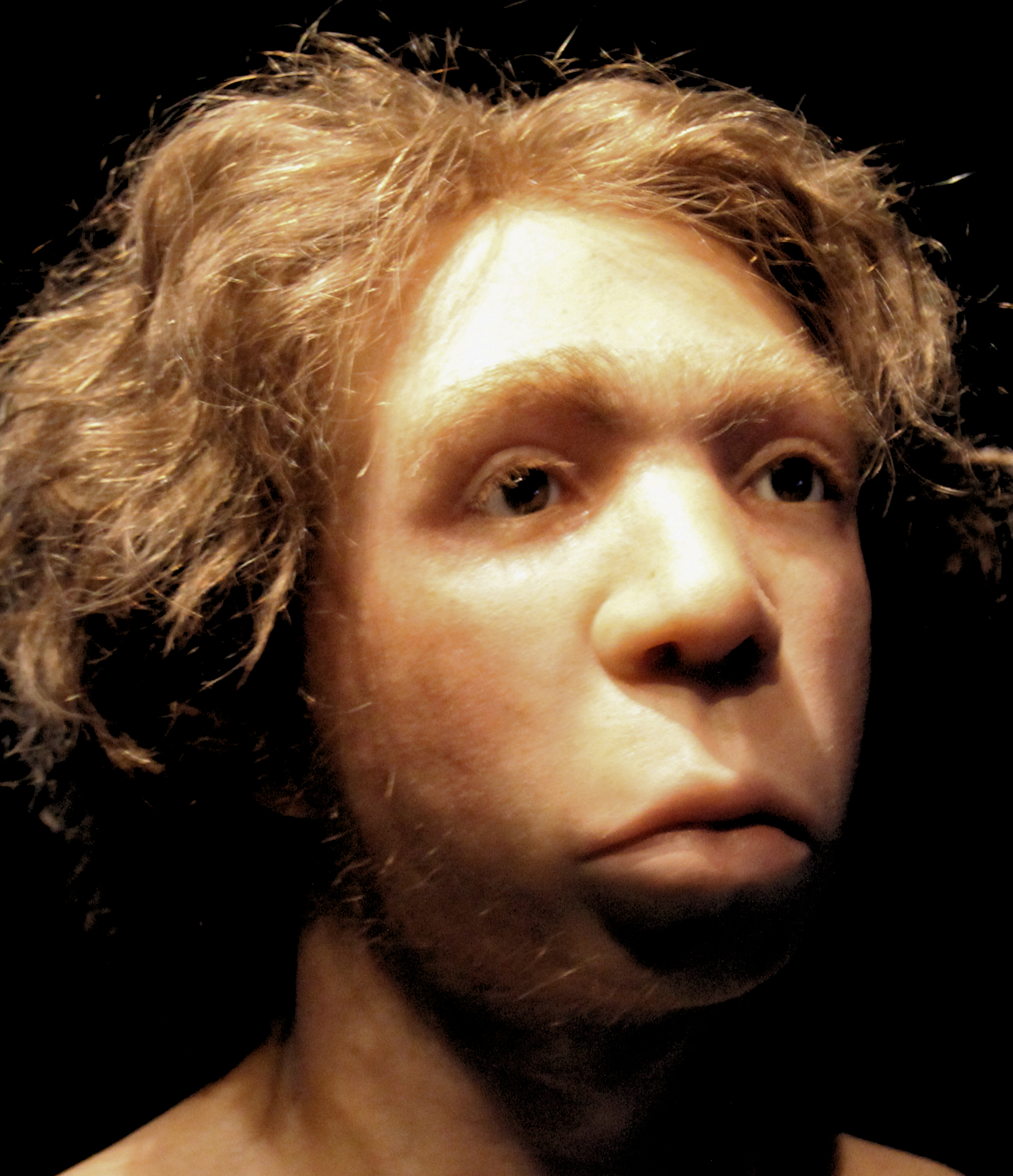
Le Moustier 1 Neanderthal facial reconstitution, Neues Museum Berlin

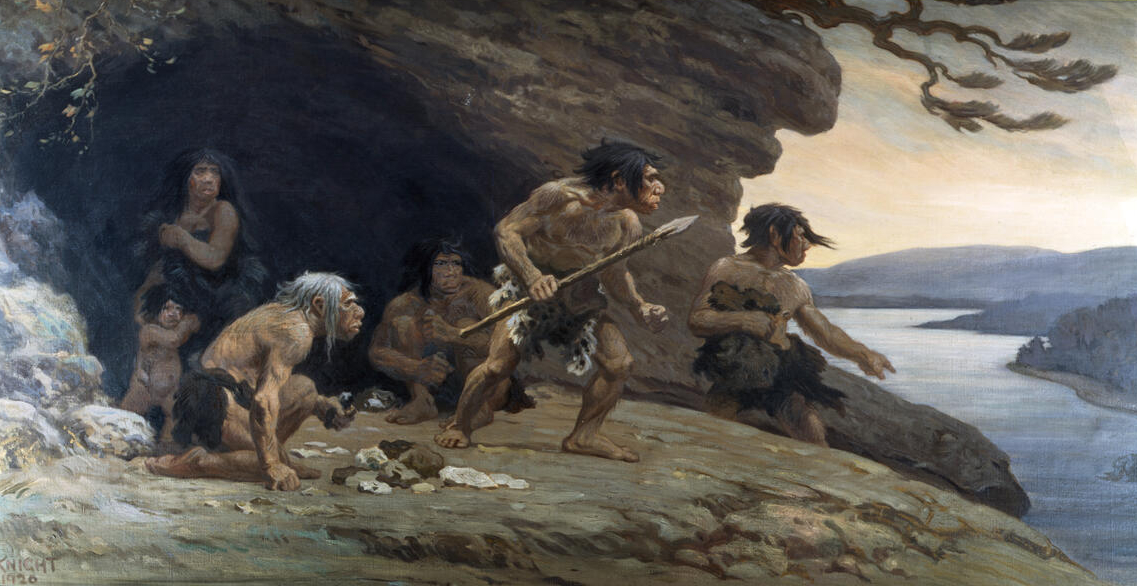
Restoration of Neanderthal Flintworkers, Le Moustier Cavern, Dordogne, France by Charles R. Knight

== Stone tools ==
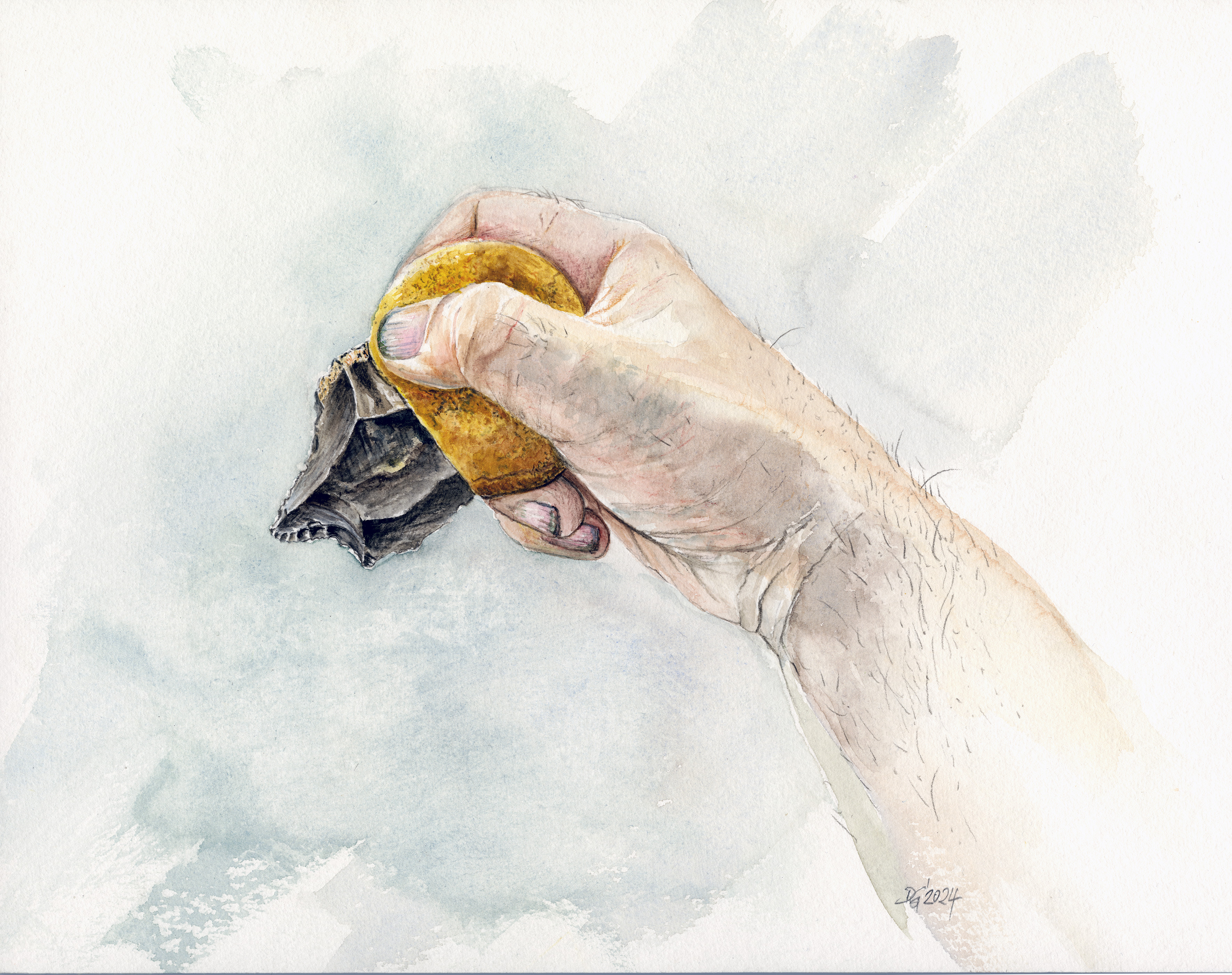
Reconstruction drawing of a flint blade from the Le Moustier site with the ochre-bitumen mixture as a handle and hypothetical handling.

Study of the artifacts found in Le Moustier reveals the use of glue made from a mixture of ochre and bitumen by Middle Paleolithic humans to make hand grips for cutting and scraping stone tools. Experiments by archaeologists showed that the mass was sufficiently sticky so that a small stone tool could get stuck in it and the mass could serve as a handle, but the hands remained clean. This presupposes knowledge of both material characteristics and that a combination of these substances results in a new material. In addition, both components, bitumen and ochre, had to be gathered from different deposits far away from each other. This required planning and foresight in order to optimise the flint blades accordingly.

== See also ==
- List of fossil sites (with link directory)
- List of hominina (hominid) fossils (with images)
