= Peyzac-le-Moustier =

- Commune
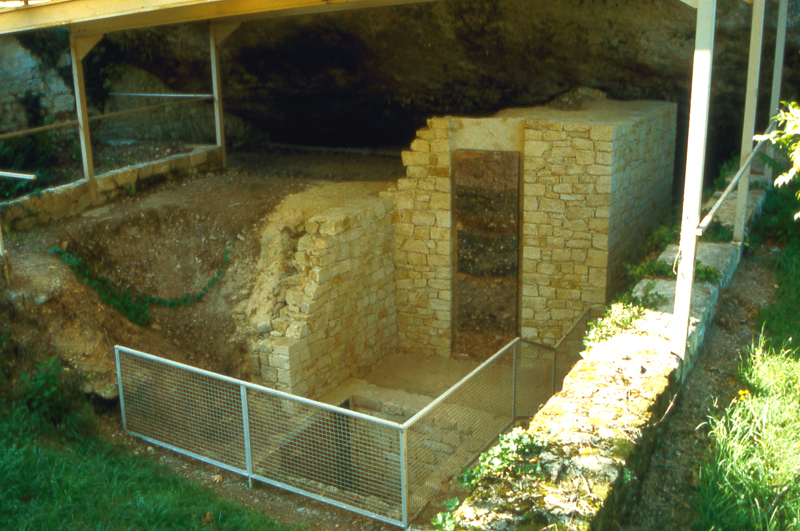
- Prehistoric site of Le Moustier
- Location of Peyzac-le-Moustier
- Location within France Location within Nouvelle-Aquitaine
- Coordinates: 44°59′30″N 1°04′47″E
- Country: France
- Region: Nouvelle-Aquitaine
- Department: Dordogne
- Arrondissement: Sarlat-la-Canéda
- Canton: Vallée de l'Homme

Government
  - Mayor (2020–2026): Joëlle Jouanel-Monribot
- Area^{1}: 10.1 km^{2} (3.9 sq mi)
- Elevation: 96 m (315 ft)
- Highest elevation: 263 m (863 ft)
- Lowest elevation: 60 m (200 ft)
- Population (2023): 201
  - Density: 19.9/km^{2} (51.5/sq mi)
- Time zone: UTC+01:00 (CET)
  - Summer (DST): UTC+02:00 (CEST)
- INSEE/Postal code: 24326 /24620
- ^{1} French Land Register data, which excludes lakes, ponds, glaciers > 1 km^{2} (0.386 sq mi or 247 acres) and river estuaries.

Peyzac-le-Moustier (French pronunciation: [pezak lə mustje]) is a commune in the Dordogne department in Nouvelle-Aquitaine in southwestern France. It is known for the nearby archeological site of Le Moustier, which is a UNESCO World Heritage Site.

== Population ==
Historical population
Year	Pop.	±% p.a.
1968	157	—
1975	119	−3.88%
1982	112	−0.86%
1990	117	+0.55%
1999	147	+2.57%
2007	141	−0.52%
2012	191	+6.26%
2017	174	−1.85%
2023	201	+2.43%
Source: INSEE

== See also ==
- Roque Saint-Christophe
- Le Moustier
- Communes of the Dordogne department
- Limeuil (prehistoric site)
