= Roque Saint-Christophe =

Archaeological site in France

The Roque Saint-Christophe is a large rock formation and archaeological site with rock shelters (abris sous-roche in French) at the river Vézère, near Peyzac-le-Moustier in the Dordogne in Aquitania, France.

The impressive rock cliff of Roque Saint-Christophe stretches for one kilometre and rises several hundred metres above the road and the Vézère River. The cliff has five terraces, shaped on the one hand by the river, which has carved into the stone for 60 million years, and on the other hand by the ice ages of the post-Tertiary period, which split the limestone rock.

During archaeological excavations in the 20th century, numerous finds provided information about the different inhabitants of this place since prehistoric times.

This rock wall first served as a shelter for hunters and gatherers. Probably the Neanderthals settled here first, around 50,000 BC, followed by Cro-Magnon humans around 25,000 BC.

After the beginning of human sedentary life in the Neolithic period, around 3,000 BC, La Roque Saint-Christophe was continuously inhabited — through the Bronze Age, Iron Age, Gallo-Roman period, Middle Ages, and so on — until the Renaissance, until 1588, when the site was destroyed and fell victim to the Wars of Religion.

The most important period of settlement is undoubtedly the Middle Ages, from the 5th century onward, when Bishop Frotaire of Périgueux decided to build a fortress in order to protect the population from Viking invasions.

La Roque Saint-Christophe is also of great interest in terms of fauna and flora, and it offers a remarkable diversity of protected species.

== Gallery ==
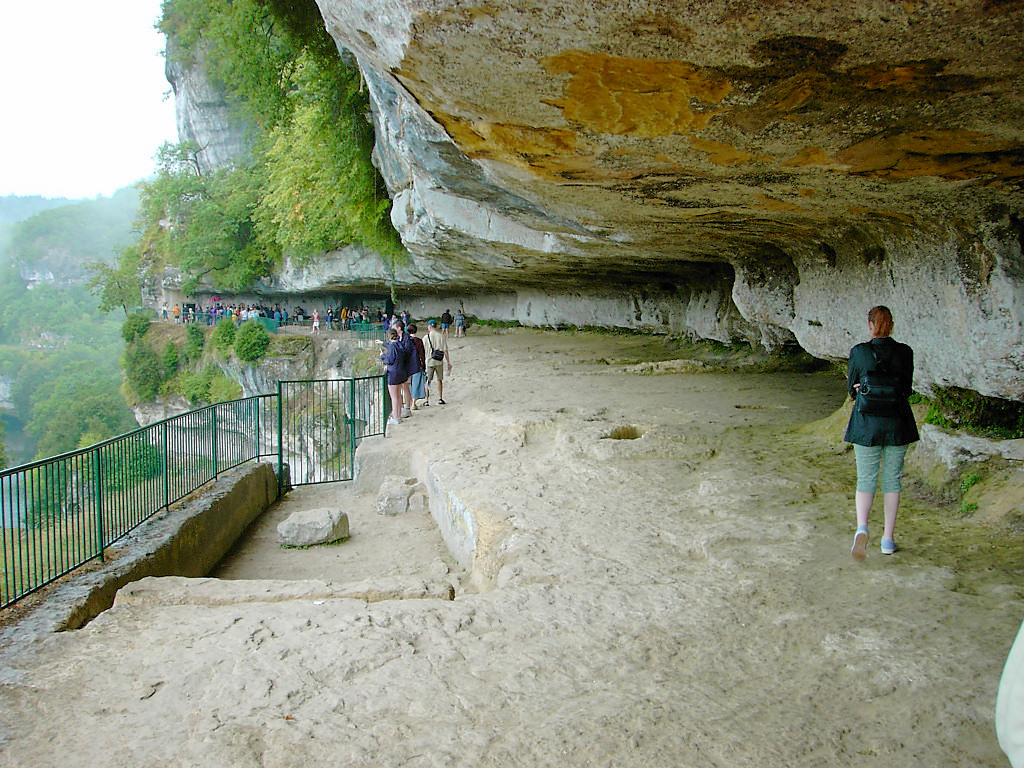

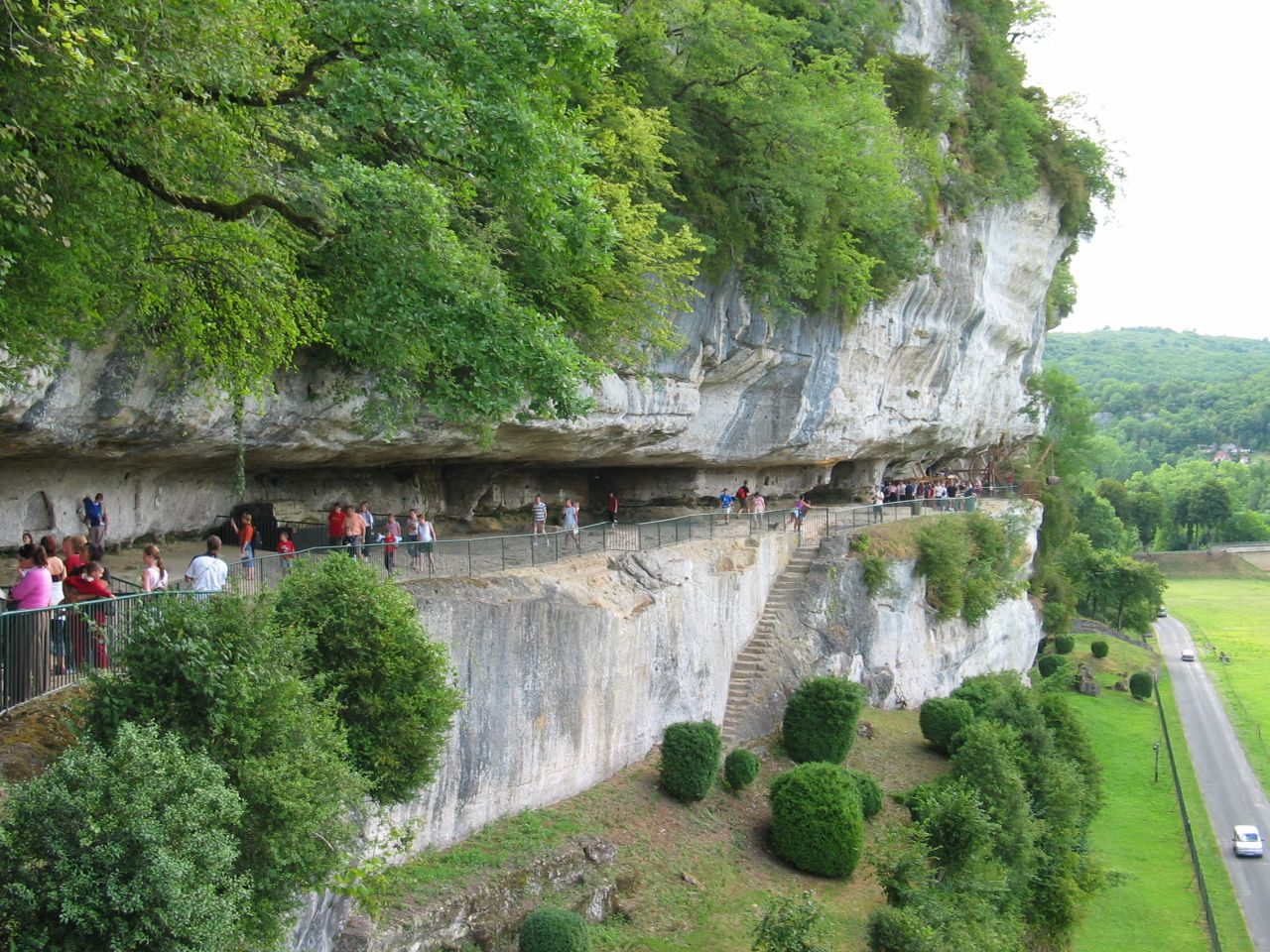

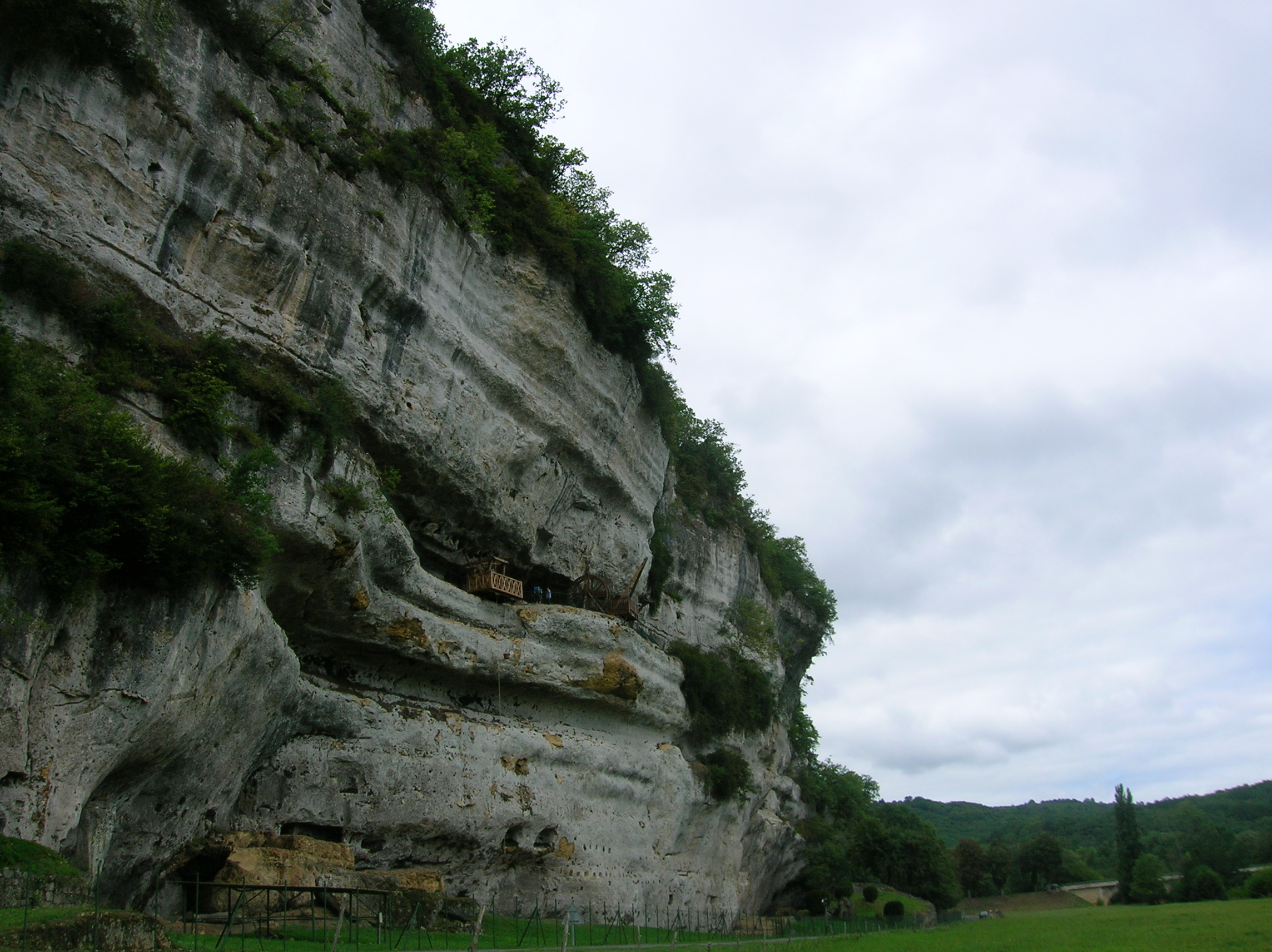
