= Mousterian =

Afro-Eurasian Middle Paleolithic culture

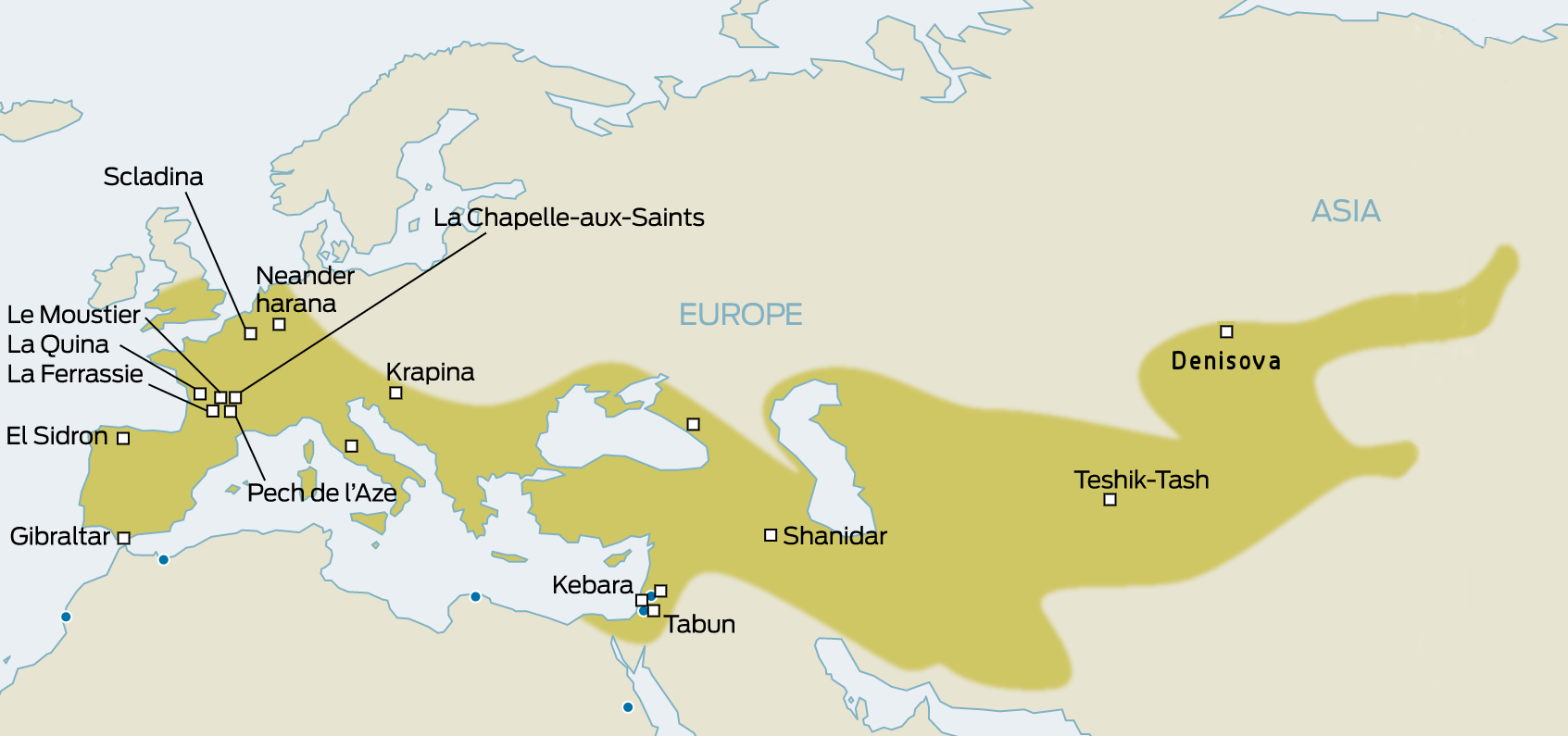
- Distribution of Homo neanderthalensis, and main sites. Mousterian industries have been found inside and outside this range (e.g., Jordan, Saudi Arabia)
- Geographical range: Africa and Eurasia
- Period: Middle Paleolithic
- Dates: c. 160,000–40,000 BP
- Type site: Le Moustier
- Major sites: Creswell Crags, Lynford Quarry, Arcy-sur-Cure, Vindija Cave, Atapuerca Mountains, Zafarraya, Gorham's Cave, Devil's Tower, Haua Fteah, Jebel Irhoud, Tabun
- Preceded by: Acheulean, Acheulo-Yabrudian complex, Micoquien, Clactonian
- Followed by: Châtelperronian, Emiran, Baradostian, Aterian, Mal'ta–Buret' culture?

The Mousterian (or Mode III) is an archaeological industry of stone tools, associated primarily with the Neanderthals in Europe and with the earliest anatomically modern humans in North Africa and West Asia. The Mousterian largely defines the latter part of the Middle Paleolithic, the middle of the West Eurasian Old Stone Age. It lasted roughly from 160,000 to 40,000 BP. If its predecessor (known as Levallois or Levallois–Mousterian) is included, the range is extended to include as early as c. 300,000–200,000 BP. The main following period is the Aurignacian (c. 43,000–28,000 BP) of Homo sapiens.

== Naming ==
The culture was named after the type site of Le Moustier, three superimposed rock shelters in the Dordogne region of France. A style of knapping has been found all over unglaciated Europe as well as West Asia and North Africa. Hand axes, racloirs, and points constitute the industry; sometimes a Levallois technique or another prepared-core technique was employed in making flint and chert flakes.

== Characteristics ==
Le Moustier remains

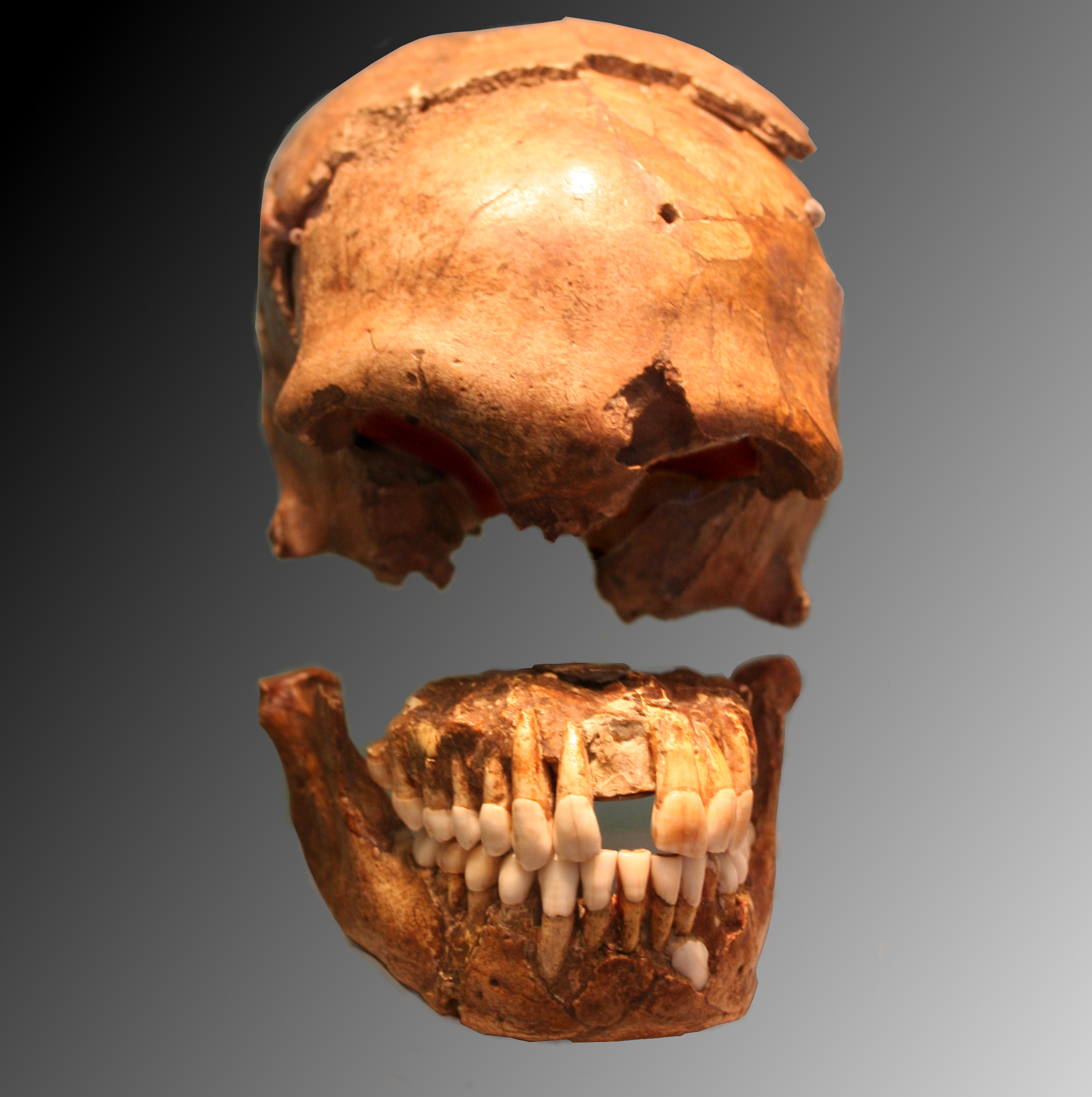
Le Moustier 1 Neanderthal skull, today in the Neues Museum, Berlin.

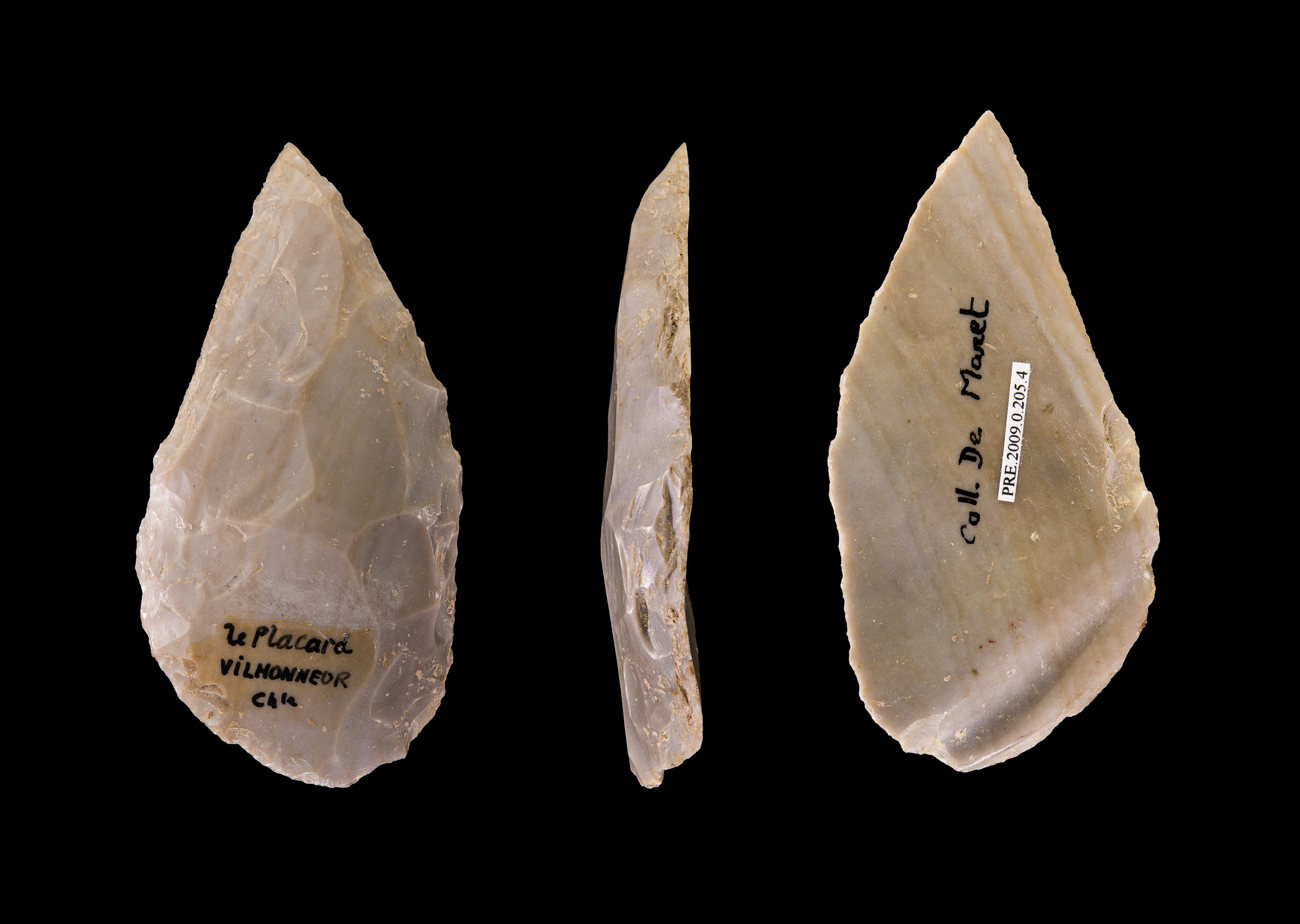
Mousterian point

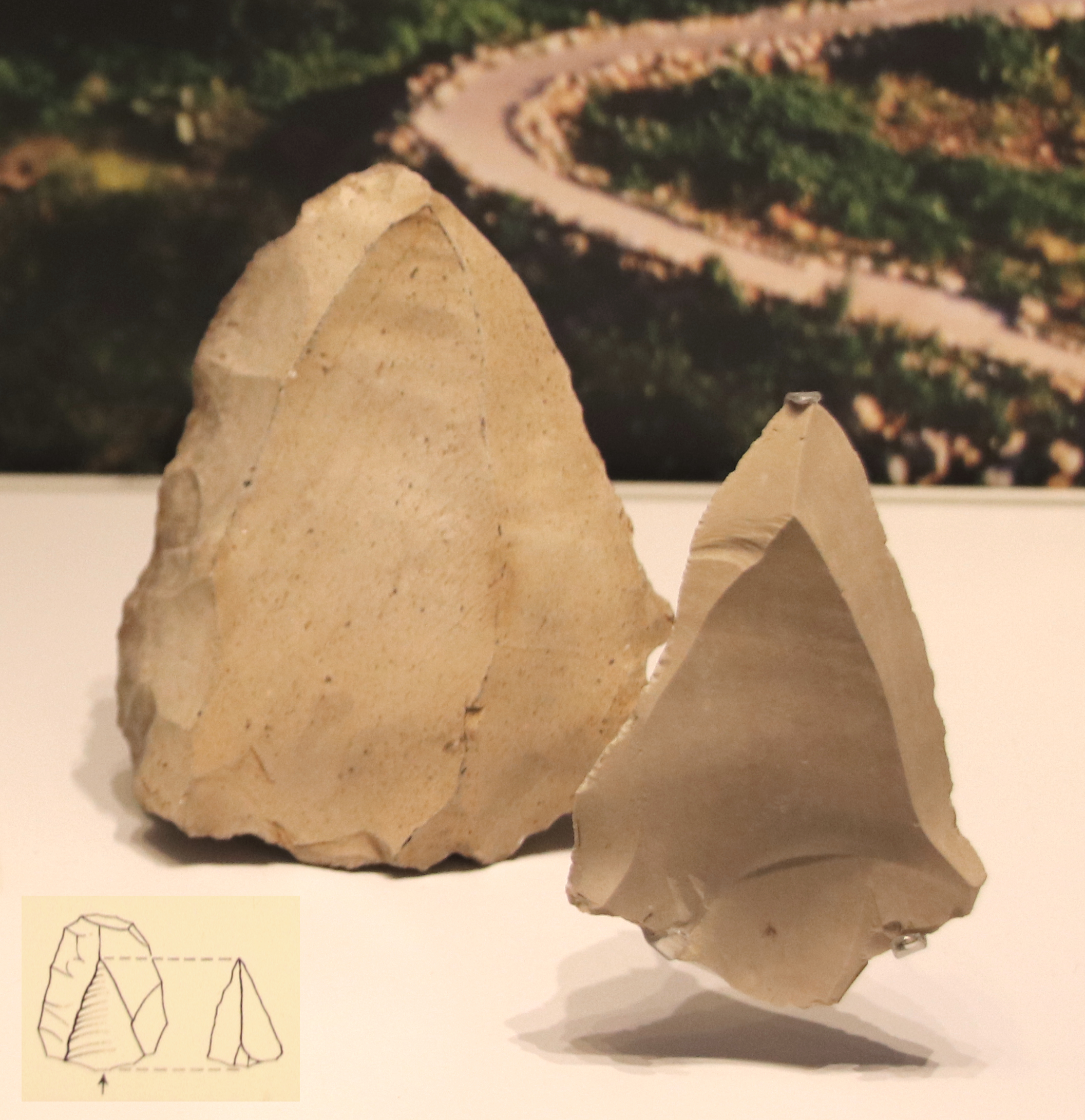
Production of points & spearheads from a flint stone core, Levallois technique, Mousterian culture, Tabun Cave, Israel, 250,000–50,000 BP. Israel Museum

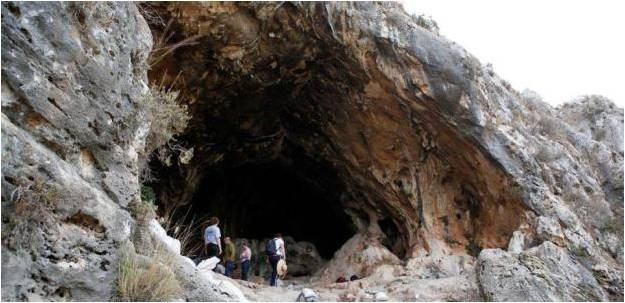
Cave entrance of Raqefet Cave, where Mousterian remains have been found.

The European Mousterian is the product of Neanderthals. It existed roughly from 160,000 to 40,000 BP. Some assemblages, namely those from Pech de l'Aze, include exceptionally small points prepared using the Levallois technique among other prepared core types, causing some researchers to suggest that these flakes take advantage of greater grip strength possessed by Neanderthals.

In North Africa and the Near East, Mousterian tools were produced by anatomically modern humans. In the Eastern Mediterranean, for example, assemblages produced by Neanderthals are indistinguishable from those made by Qafzeh type modern humans. The Mousterian industry in North Africa is estimated to be 315,000 years old.

Possible variants are Denticulate, Charentian (Ferrassie & Quina) named after the Charente region, Typical, and the Mousterian Traditional Acheulian (MTA) Type-A and Type-B. The industry continued alongside the new Châtelperronian industry during the 45,000–40,000 BP period.

== Locations ==
Sites with significant Neanderthal and Mousterian finds in northwestern Croatia are Krapina, Vindija, Velika pećina and Veternica. Mousterian industry sites on Istrian peninsula are Romualdova pećina and an open-air site at Campanož. Sites on the Adriatic coast and its hinterland are Mujina pećina, with a Mousterian stratigraphic sequence, and Velika pećina in Kličevica with finds approximately 40,000 years old that are late Mousterian. An underwater Mousterian excavation site at Kaštel Štafilić - Resnik recovered about 100 artefacts of which half are tools, Mousterian centripetal cores and side scrapers, several pseudotools, numerous pieces of chert and Levallois method artifacts. Other underwater Paleolithic finds are a single Mousterian tool offshore of Povljana on the island of Pag and stone tools of possible Mousterian type at a depth of 3 m at Stipanac in Lake Prokljan. North of the town of Zadar an extensive series of sites exist where usually small Micro-mousterian industry tools, denticulates and notched pieces are found.

- Haua Fteah in Cyrenaica and other sites in northwest Africa
- Within a cave in the Syria region, along with a Neanderthaloid skeleton
- Haibak valley of Afghanistan
- Zagros and Central Iran
- Atapuerca, Spain
- Gorham's Cave in Gibraltar
- Teshik-Tash site, Uzbekistan
- Turkmenistan
- Denisova Cave, Siberia
- Israel, along with remains of both Neandertals and Homo sapiens sapiens
- Lynford Quarry, Norfolk, England
- Azykh Cave, Azerbaijan
- Montgaudier Cave, France
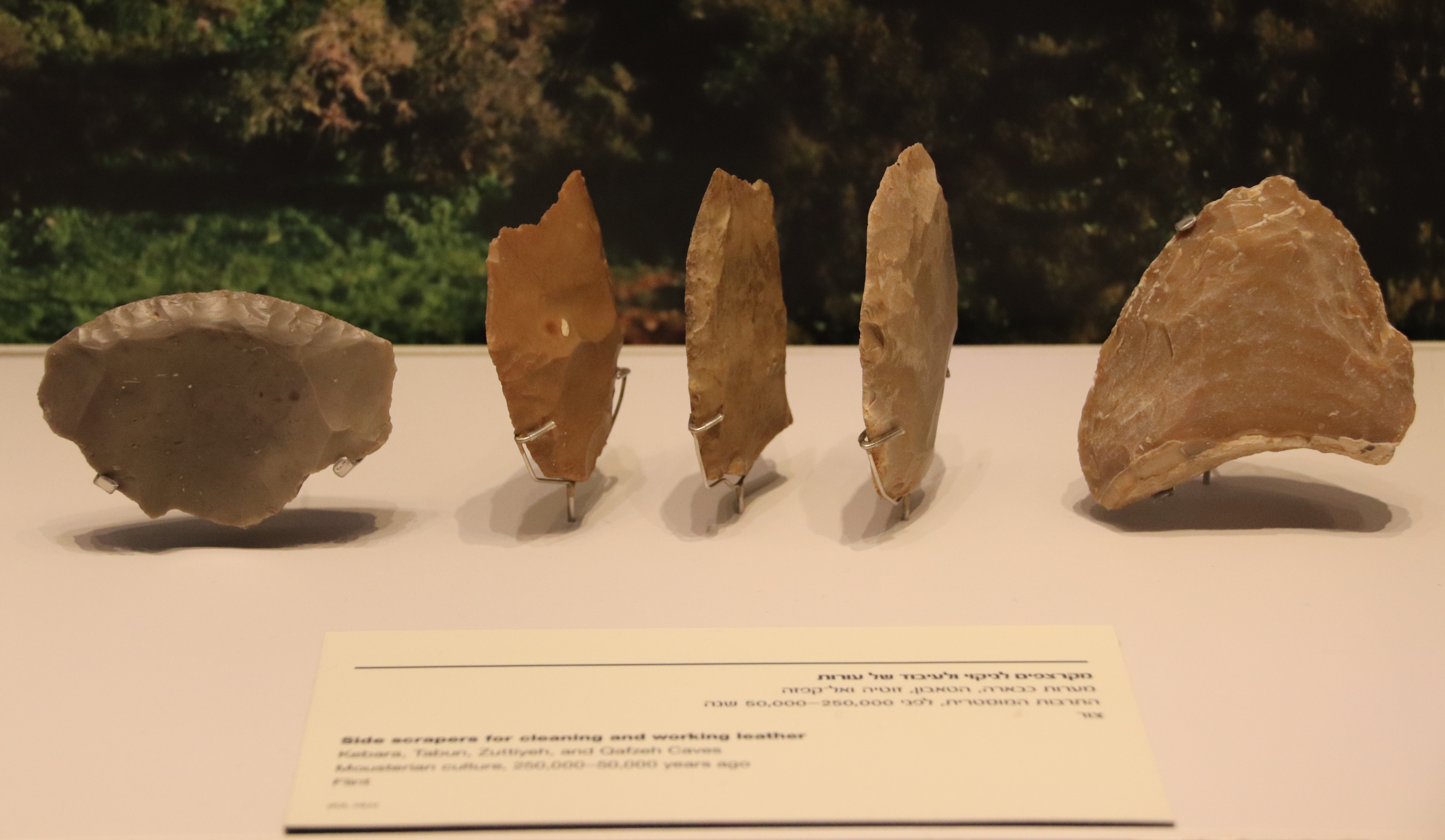
Stone scrapers for cleaning and working leather, Mousterian Culture, Israel, 250,000-50,000 BP

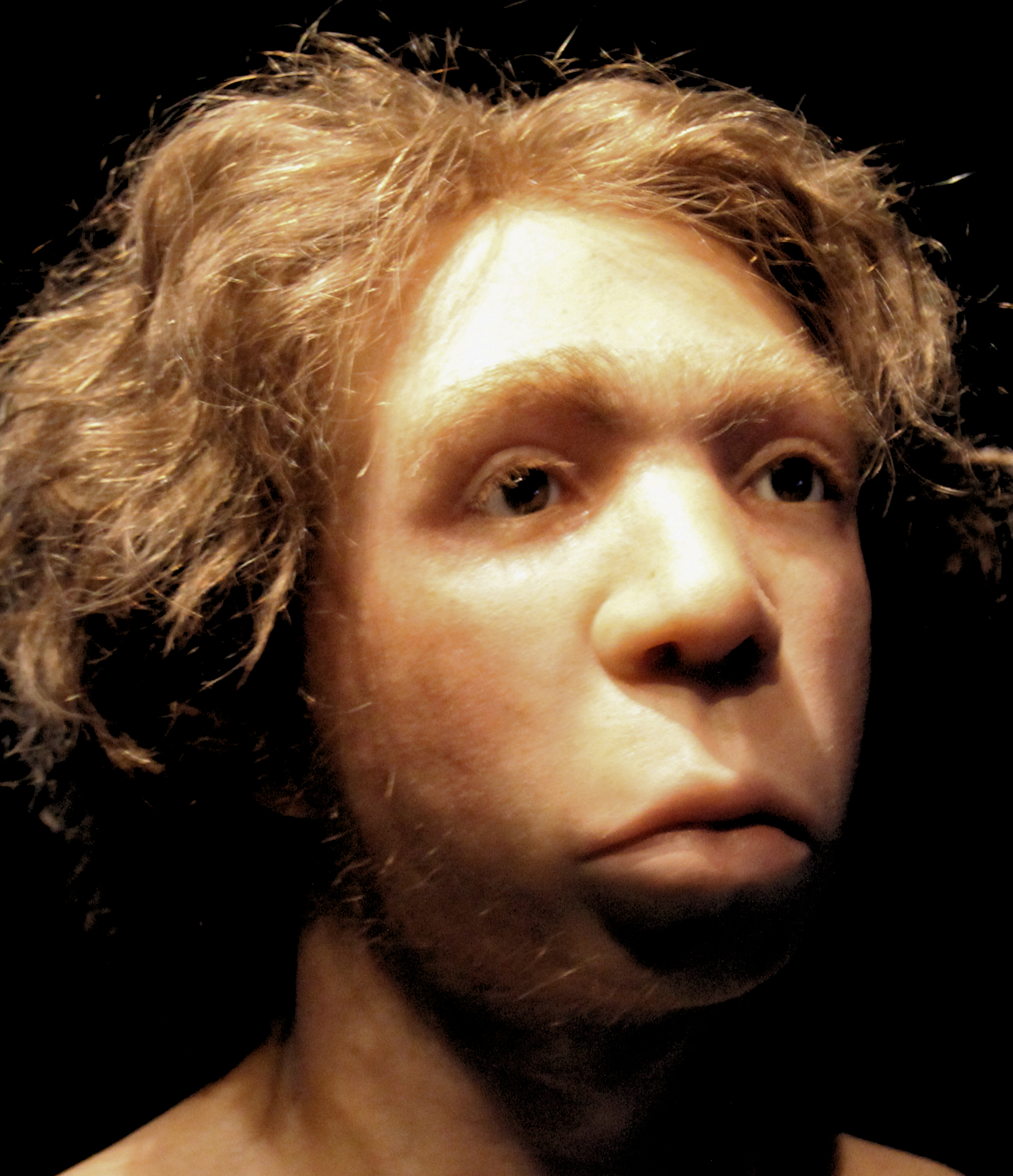
Le Moustier Neanderthal skull reconstitution, Neues Museum Berlin

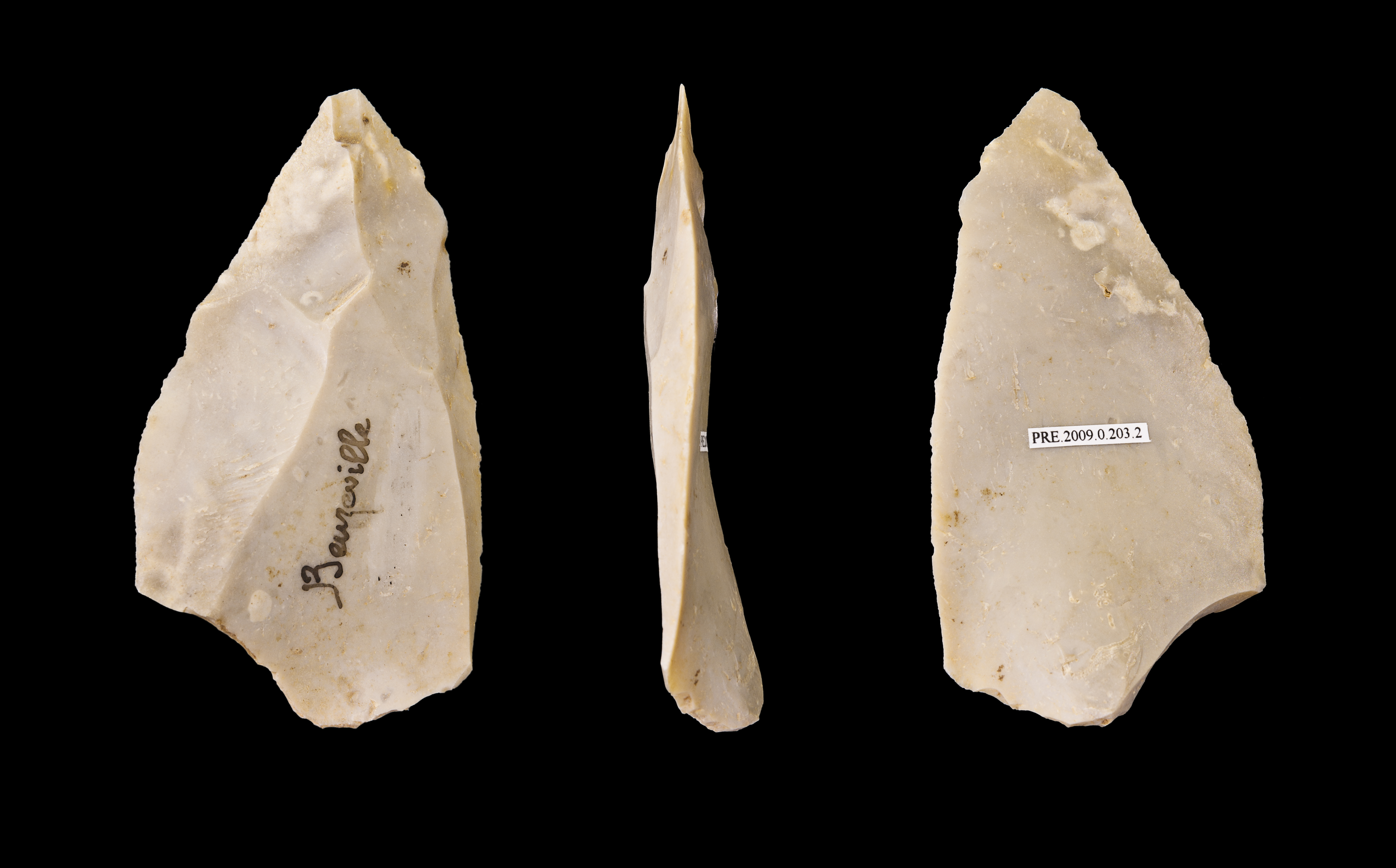
Levallois points

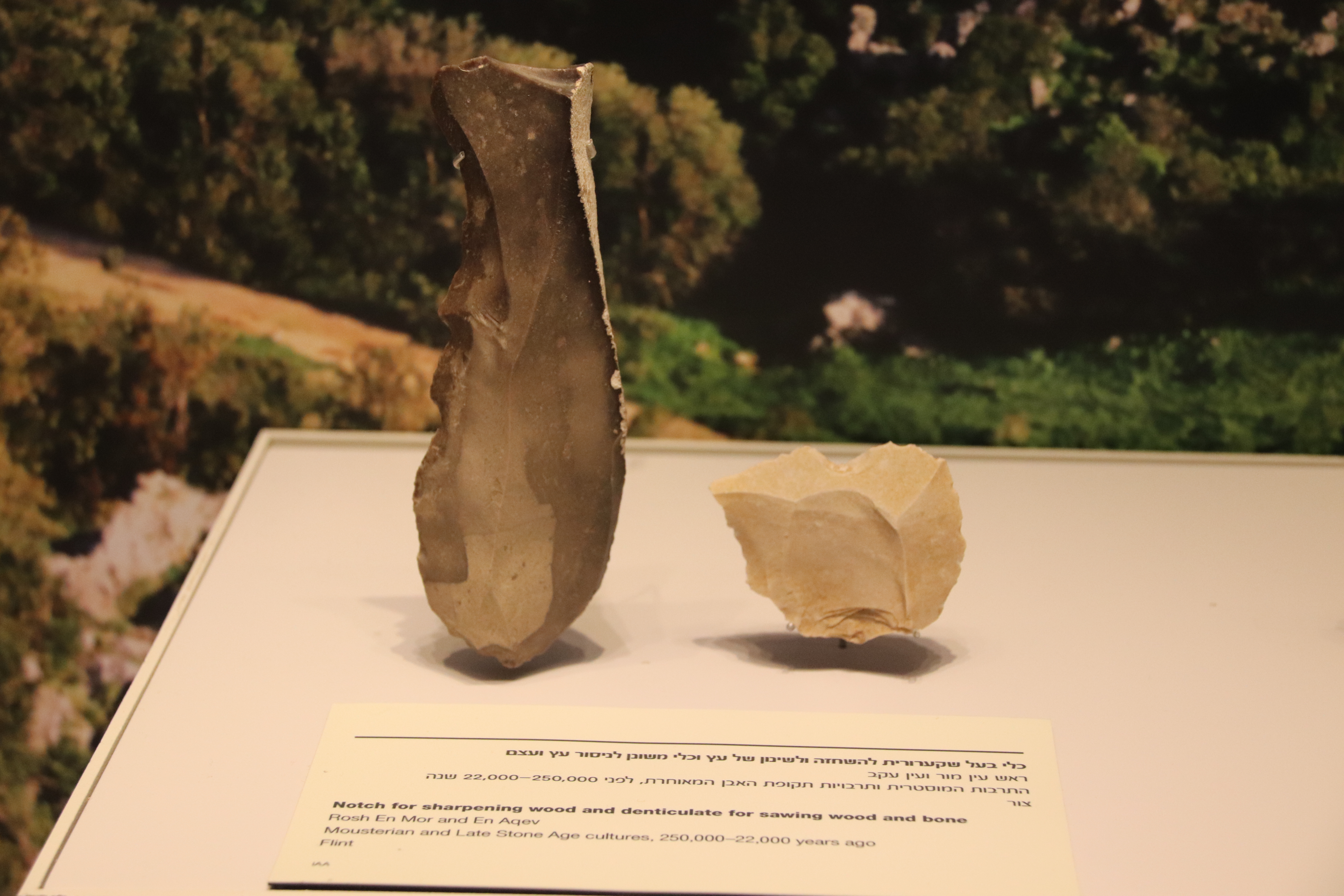
Mousterian Culture and Late Stone Age Stone Tools. Notch for sharpening wood, and denticulate for sawing wood and bone. Rosh En Mor and En Aqev. 250,000-22,000 BP. Israel

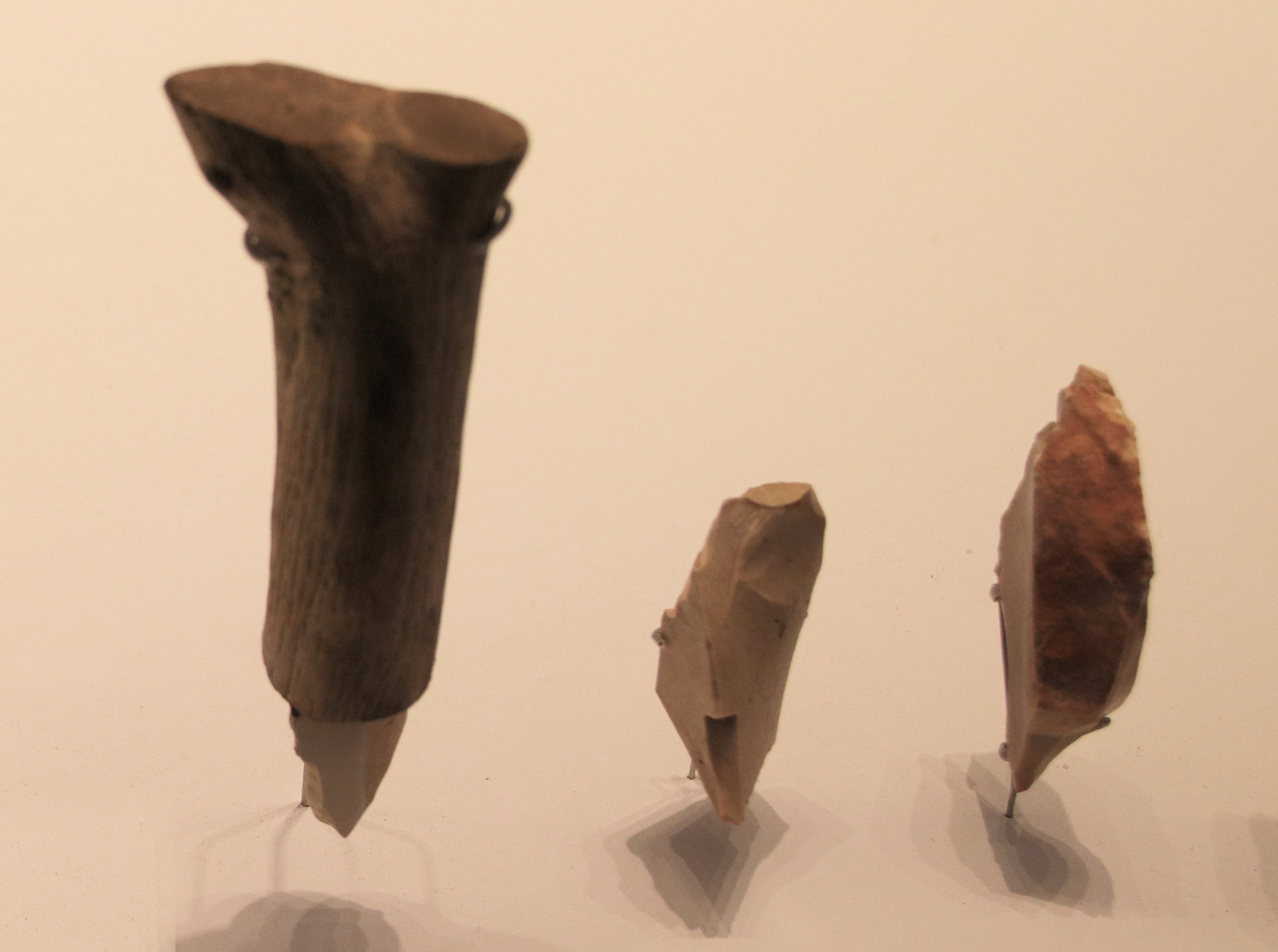
Mousterian and Aurignacian stone burins for incising stone and wood, from the caves of Qafzeh, HaYonim, and El Wad (250,000–22,000 BP). Israel Museum

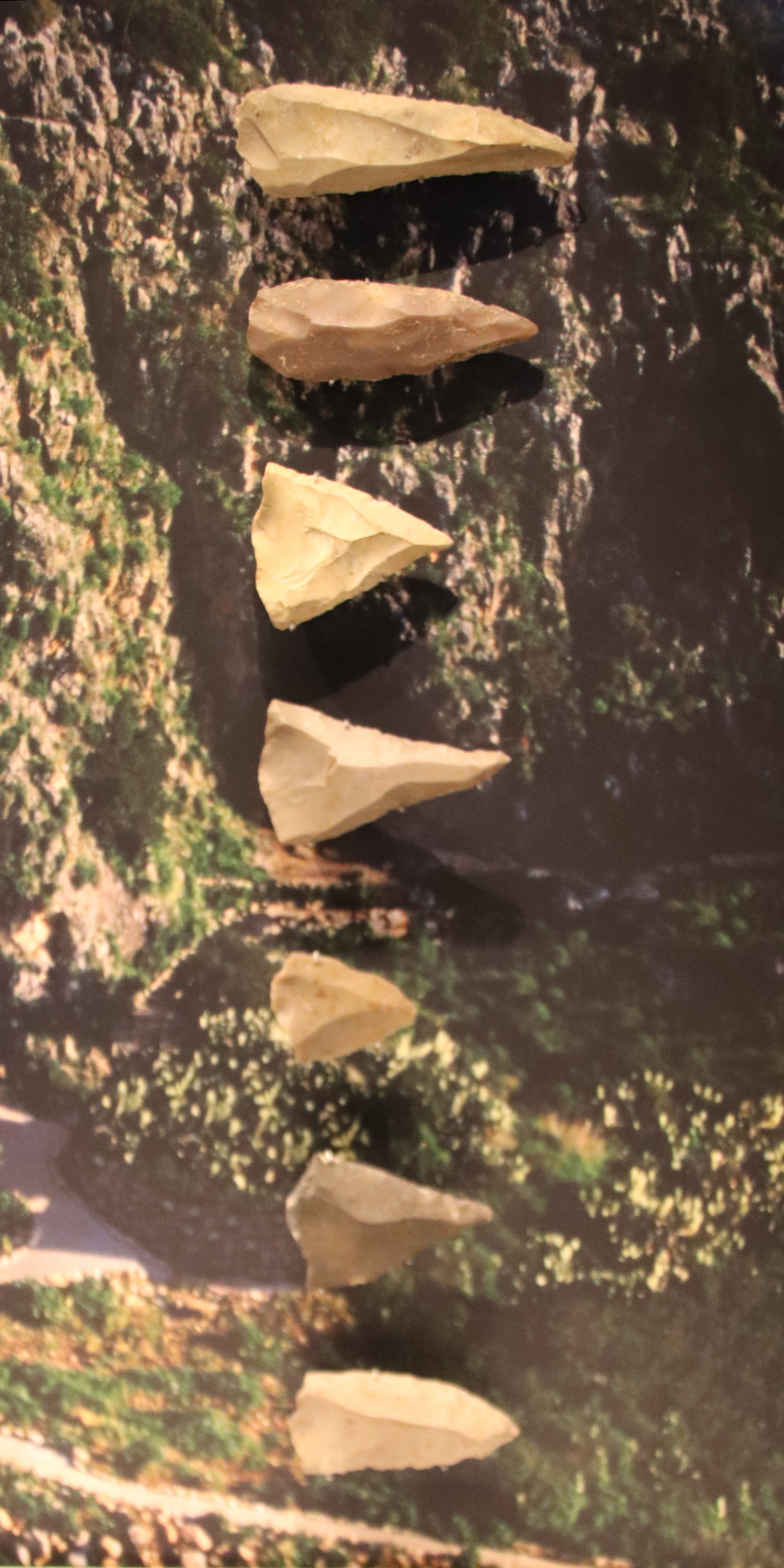
Mousterian stone spearheads from the Daughters of Jacob Bridge and the caves of Tabun, Kebara, and Amud (250,000–50,000 BP). Israel Museum.

Preceded by Micoquien	Mousterian; 600,000—40,000 BP	Succeeded by Châtelperronian
