= Lynford Quarry =

Archaeological site in England

Lynford Quarry is the location of a well-preserved in-situ Middle Palaeolithic open-air archaeological site near Mundford, Norfolk.

== Discoveries ==
The site, which dates to approximately 60,000 years ago, is believed to show evidence of hunting by Neanderthals (Homo neanderthalensis). The finds include the in-situ remains of at least nine woolly mammoths (Mammuthus primigenius), associated with Mousterian stone tools and debitage. The artefactual, faunal and environmental evidence were sealed within a Middle Devensian palaeochannel with a dark organic fill. Well preserved in-situ sites of the time are exceedingly rare in Europe and very unusual within a British context.

The site also produced rhinoceros teeth, antlers, and other faunal evidence. The stone tools on the site numbered 600, made up of individual artefacts or waste flakes. Particularly interesting were the 44 hand axes of sub-triangular or ovate form.

== Dating ==
The site was dated to Marine Isotope Stage 3 using Optically Stimulated Luminescence dating of the sand from the two layers of deposits within the channel.

== Gallery ==
Stone hand axes found at Lynford Quarry
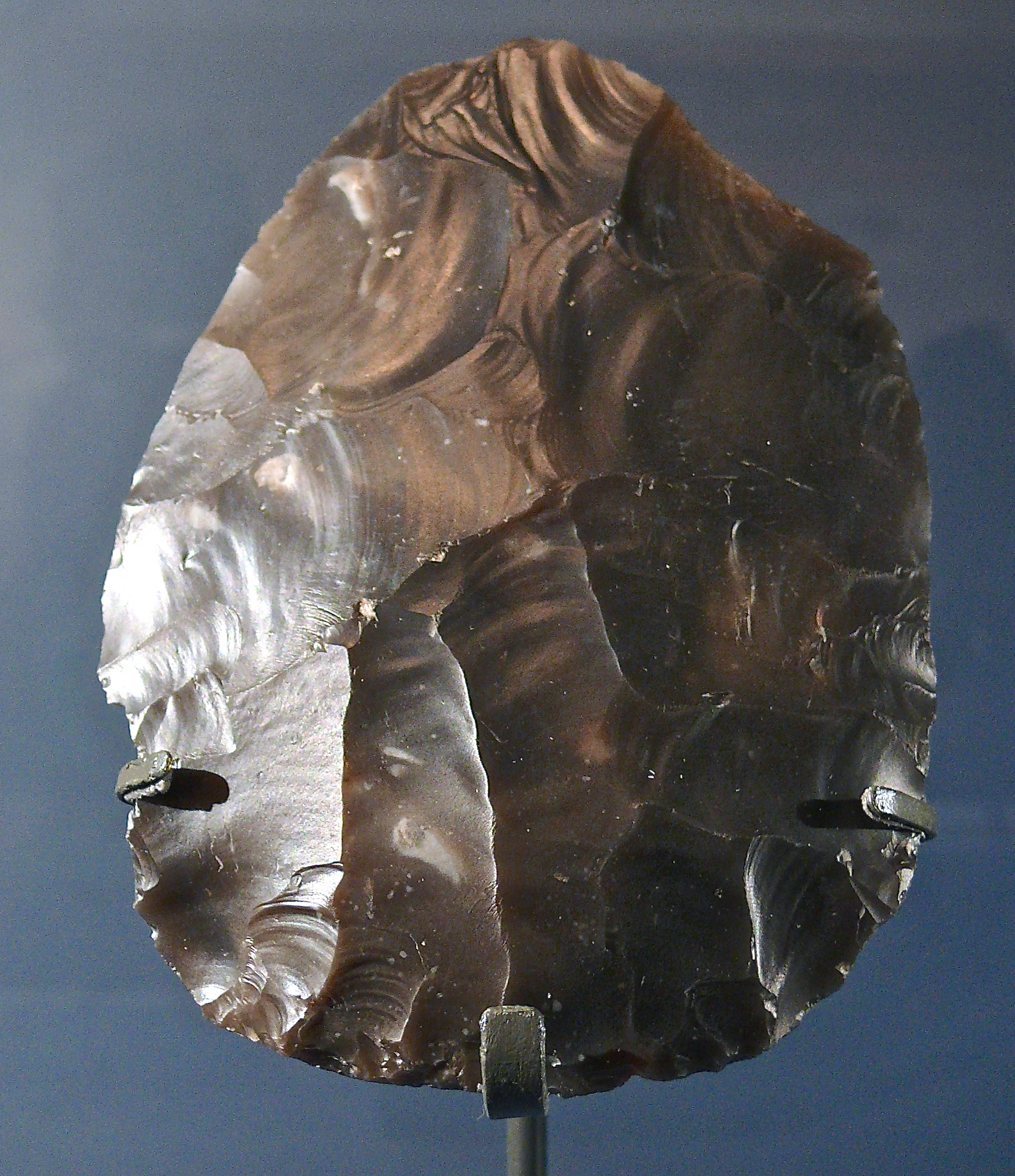
Discoid hand axe

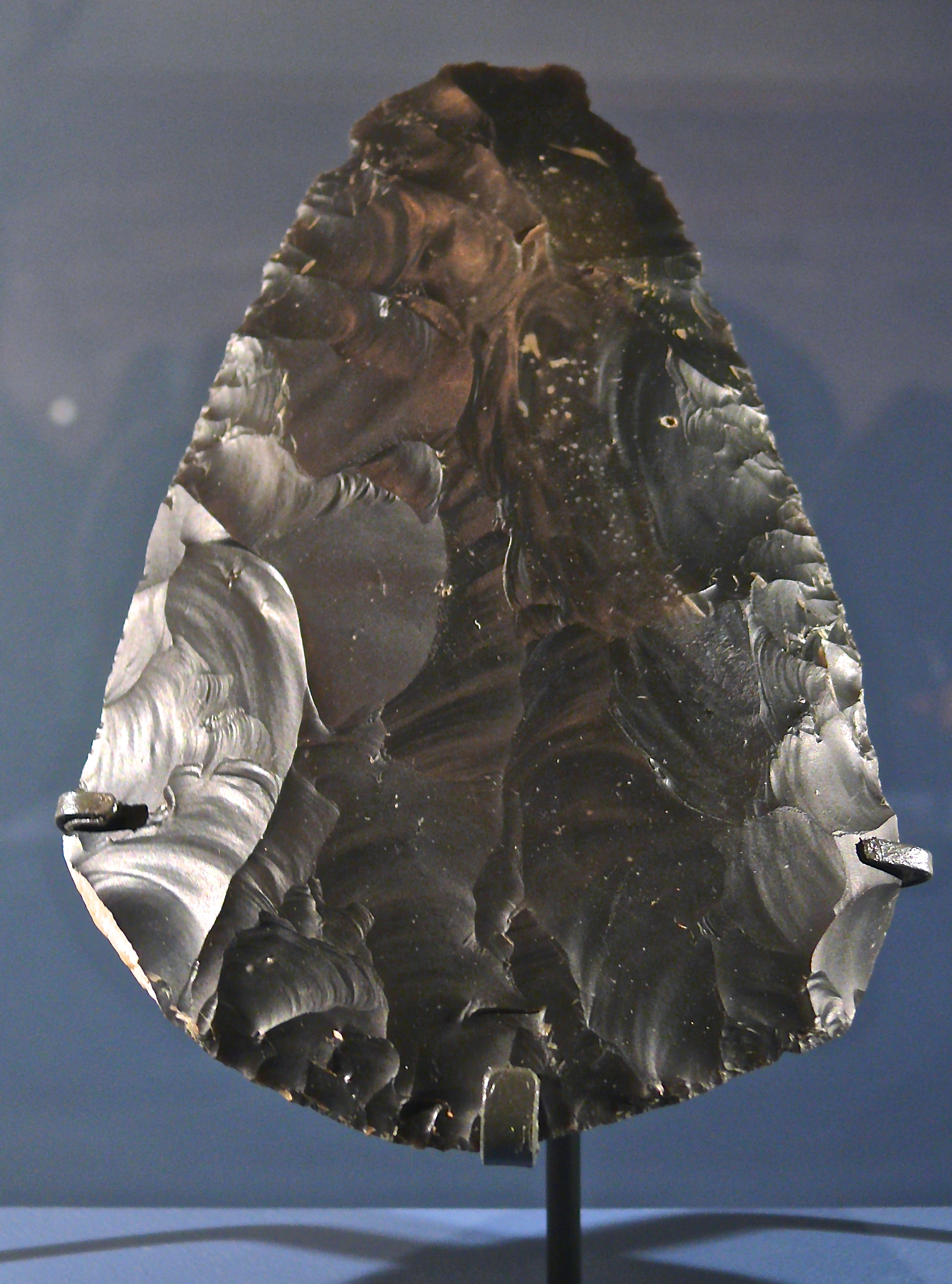
Cordiform hand axe

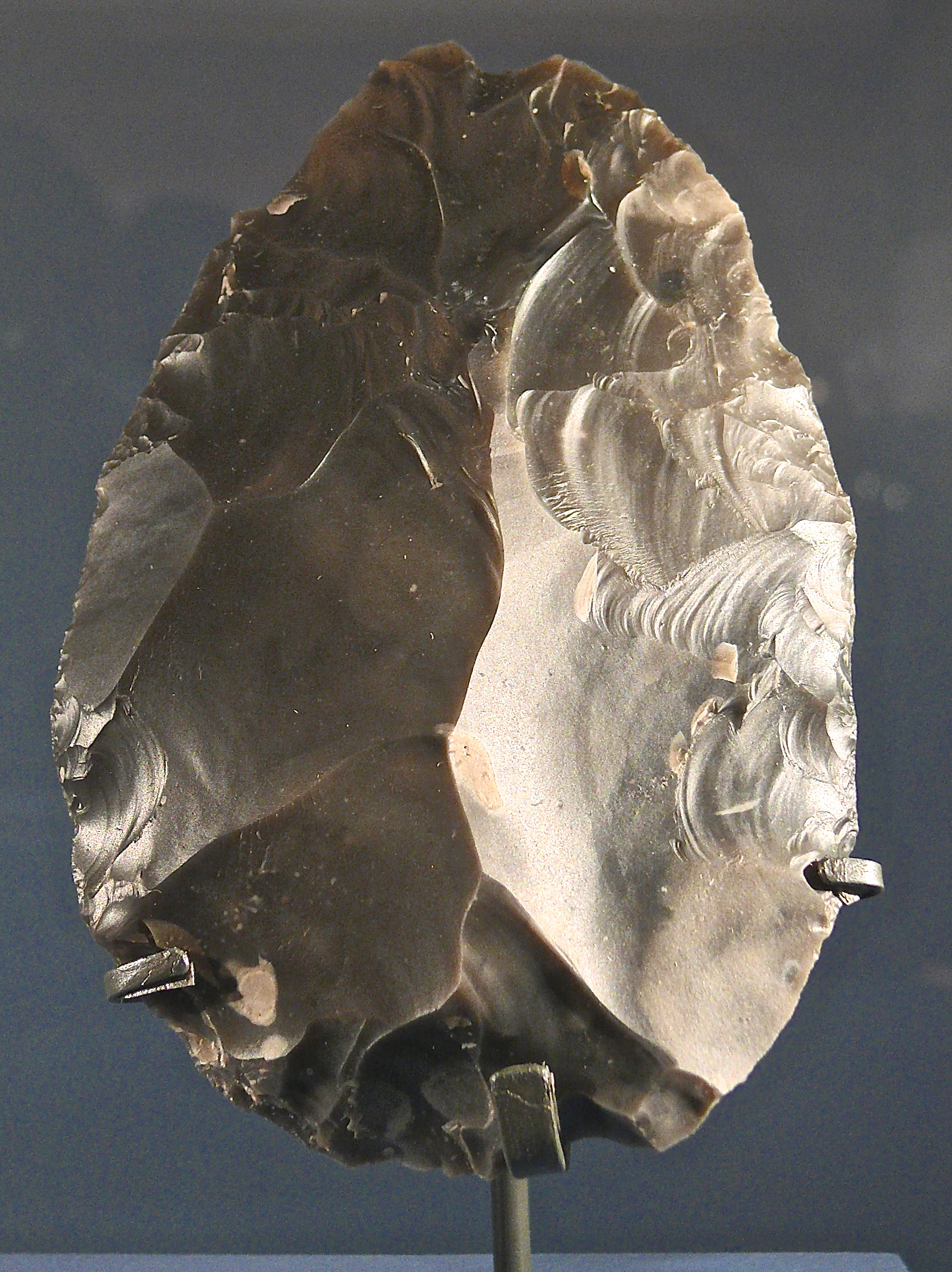
Amygdaloid hand axe

== See also ==
- Prehistoric Norfolk
