= Lynford =

Village in Norfolk, England

Coordinates: 52.48768°N 0.67977°E

- Location within Norfolk
- Area: 24.72 km^{2} (9.54 sq mi)
- Population: 157 (2001 census)
  - Density: 6/km^{2} (16/sq mi)
- OS grid reference: TL820911
- District: Breckland
- Shire county: Norfolk
- Region: East
- Country: England
- Sovereign state: United Kingdom
- Post town: Thetford
- Postcode district: IP26
- Dialling code: 01842
- Police: Norfolk
- Fire: Norfolk
- Ambulance: East of England
- UK Parliament: South West Norfolk

Lynford is a village and civil parish in the Breckland District of Norfolk. The parish covers an area of 24.72 km^{2} (9.54 sq mi), and the 2001 Census recorded a population of 157 in 81 households. Lynford lies 4 miles (6.4 km) north east of Brandon and between Mundford, 2 miles (3.2 km) to the north west, and Thetford, 6.5 miles (10.5 km) to the south east, on the A134. It lies deep within Breckland forestry land between the Stanford Training Area and Thetford Forest.

Lynford was served by a Roman Catholic chapel of ease, now in the care of the Norfolk Churches Trust. Our Lady of Consolation and Saint Stephen was joined to St Mary's Catholic Church in Thetford.

Lynford Hall, which is actually closer to Mundford, was rebuilt in the 19th century by Stephens Lyne-Stephens who was known as the richest commoner in England. The hall is now a hotel and conference centre. Lynford Arboretum and Lakes, formerly part of Lynford Hall estate, is now owned by the Forestry Commission.

Grimes Graves, the only Neolithic flint mine open to visitors in Great Britain, lie a mile to the south. Lynford Quarry is one of only two sites on mainland Britain which has evidence of Neanderthal occupation.
