= Mundford =

Village in Norfolk, England

Coordinates: 52.508281°N 0.655746°E

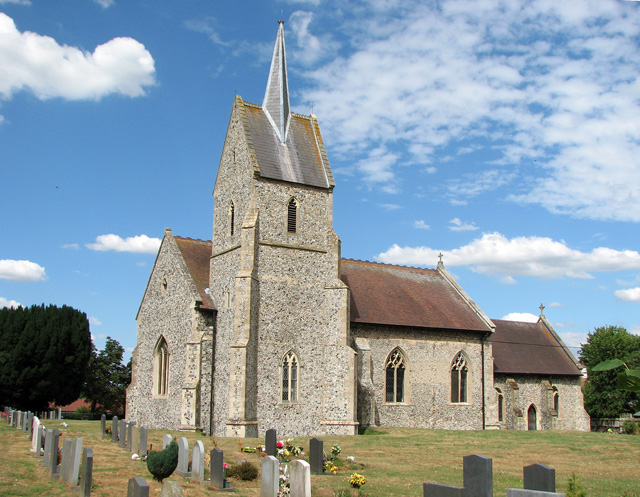
- St Leonard's Church, Mundford

- Location within Norfolk
- Area: 8.32 km^{2} (3.21 sq mi)
- Population: 1,526 (2011 Census)
  - Density: 183/km^{2} (470/sq mi)
- OS grid reference: TL802933
- District: Breckland
- Shire county: Norfolk
- Region: East
- Country: England
- Sovereign state: United Kingdom
- Post town: THETFORD
- Postcode district: IP26
- Dialling code: 01842
- Police: Norfolk
- Fire: Norfolk
- Ambulance: East of England
- UK Parliament: South West Norfolk

Mundford is a village and civil parish in the English county of Norfolk. It is situated at the intersection of two major routes, the A134 Colchester to King's Lynn road and the A1065 Mildenhall to Fakenham road, about 8 miles (13 km) north west of Thetford. The village is 35 miles (56 km) from the city of Norwich and 88 miles (142 km) from London.

The village's name means 'Munda's ford'.

The civil parish, in 1845, had 437 inhabitants, and 1609 acres of land, exclusive of a common of 190 acres, and also 90 acres of heath, where the parishioners had the right of fuel and rabbits, but no pasturage. Today it has an area of 2,060 acres (830 ha) and in the 2001 census had a population of 1,591 in 669 households. The population at the 2011 Census had reduced to 1,526 in 652 households. The parish shares boundaries with the adjacent parishes of Didlington, Cranwich, Weeting-with-Broomhill, Lynford and Ickburgh. The parish falls within the district of Breckland. Local government responsibilities are shared between the parish, district and county councils.

== Local history ==
Lynford Quarry in Mundford is a well-preserved in-situ Middle Palaeolithic open-air site dating to 60,000 years ago that is believed to show evidence of Neanderthal activity.

== Church ==
St Leonard's is the ancient Church of England parish church. It is a Grade II* listed building. The earliest parts of the church were built in 1220; the font is 14th century with a 17th-century cover. In 1911–12, Captain F. J. O. Montagu of Lynford Hall commissioned Ninian Comper to complete the front pews of the nave, the pulpit, reading desk, organ loft and case, reredos, chancel stalls and ceiling. There is a good ring of six bells, all of which were cast by John Taylor & Co in 1945. The organ is a three-manual instrument built by Harrison & Harrison of Durham in 1912. The tradition of this Church is moderate Catholic and vestments are worn. In the 16th century the Killingworth family were the patrons (see below). In 1845 Sir Richard Sutton was patron, and the vicar was the Rev. John Raven, B.A.

== Manors ==
There were two recorded manors at Mundford (anciently Montfort after that family) both originally held of the Church. One was West Hall. On the 26 July 1561, Richard Killingworth (d. 1586), as Lord of West Hall manor in the parish of Mundford, presented to the church there, of which he was Patron. His son & heir-apparent, John Killingworth (d. 1617), presented in 1574, and Richard the father again on 16 August 1577. Giles Killingworth [John's son and heir-apparent] presented on 21 July 1608. Giles died seized of the manor etc., on 26 February 1634, leaving by his second wife Elizabeth, daughter of Samuel Hare in the City of London, a son and heir, James, then aged 15. Soon after this the manor was purchased by his cousin, Sir Giles Alington of Horseheath, Knt., (d. 1638) and settled on James, his son by his second wife Dorothy, daughter of Michael Dalton. James died young after a fall from a horse, and the manor passed to his half-brother, William, 1st Lord Alington (1610–1648). By 1845 Lord Berners possessed West Hall. The other was East Hall Manor, also purchased about 1630 by Sir Giles Alington but by 1845 most of the parish belonged to Sir Richard Sutton, Lord of East Hall.

== World War II ==
On 16 December 1942, British double agent Eddie Chapman was flown on a mission to Britain by the Germans in a Focke-Wulf bomber, converted for parachuting, from Le Bourget airfield. He was equipped with wireless, pistol, cyanide capsule and £1,000 and, amongst other things, was given the task of sabotaging the de Havilland aircraft factory at Hatfield. After an uncomfortable flight, during which he suffered a nosebleed due to a poorly tightened oxygen mask, Chapman became stuck in the hatch as he tried to leave the aircraft. Finally detaching himself, he landed some distance from the target location of Mundford, near the village of Littleport, Cambridgeshire.
