= Lynford Hall =

Country house in Norfolk, England

Lynford Hall Hotel
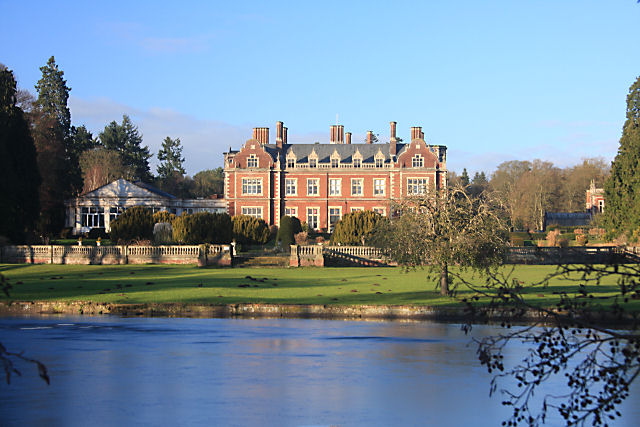

- Norfolk

General information
- Location: Mundford, Breckland District, Norfolk, England, Lynford Hall Hotel; Mundford; Nr Thetford; Norfolk; IP26 5HW
- Coordinates: 52°30′51.42″N 0°40′46.60″E
- Opening: Built in 1874

Other information
- Number of rooms: 29 en-suite bedrooms
- Number of suites: 9
- Number of restaurants: 1 (The Duvernay)
- Number of bars: 1 (The Wellingtonia)
- Parking: yes

Website
- Hotel website

Lynford Hall is a neo-Jacobean country house at Mundford, near Thetford in the English county of Norfolk. It is now a hotel.

== Location ==
The Lynford Hall Hotel is a short distance east of the A1065 which links Fakenham to Mildenhall. The hotel is 36.8 miles (59.2 km) south west of the city of Norwich. The hotel is 5.4 miles (8.7 km) north east from the nearest railway station which is at Brandon. The nearest commercial airport is in Norwich, 39.3 miles (63.2 km) north east of the hotel.

== History ==
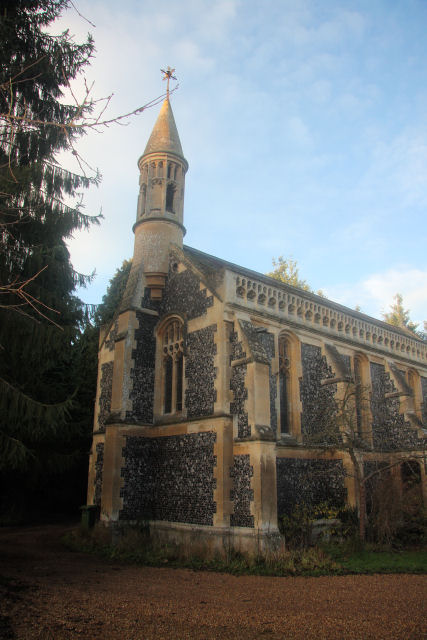
Roman Catholic chapel of St Mary and St Stephen

The first hall at Lynford was built in about 1500. In about 1717 James Nelthorpe acquired the Lynford estate from Sir Charles Turner. He built a new house with pleasant gardens, plantations and water features a little distance from the old hall which became the farm-house. The estate remained in the Nelthorpe family until 1805 when it was acquired by George Eyres. After several other owners, it was purchased by Sir Richard Sutton in 1827. Sutton commissioned the architect Charles Robert Cockerell to alter and remodel the house and expanded the grounds and park. The estate was sold in 1856 to Stephens Lyne-Stephens, who demolished the house in 1863.

Stephens was said at the time to be the richest commoner in England and commissioned the present house which was built between 1857 and 1862 by William Burn. He was married to the French ballerina Yolande (Pauline) Duvernay for whom he had a Catholic chapel built out of native flintstone. Stephens died before the estate house was completed, but Yolande retained the house and estate until her death in 1894.

Under later owners, regular guests included Joe Kennedy, then the United States ambassador to the United Kingdom. He was often accompanied on his visits by his sons Joe Jr., John and Robert. Ernest Hemingway is said to have propped up Lynford's Royal Wellingtonia bar with Sir James Calder, in the 1930s. Hemingway described shooting on the estate as "like sucking the core out of a fig."

Lynford was gutted by fire in the 1920s destroying the east wing of the building, (which has yet to be replaced). There are still many signs of the fire, the most obvious being that the third-floor window surrounds now stand proud of the roof.

The government used the Hall as a hospital during World War II. Some carved names can still be found in trees on the grounds from this period. The estate house was also used by American forces during World War II, and they installed a hot-water central-heating system for the main building. The Forestry Commission bought the Hall and used it as a training school until the 1960s. By this time the house was poorly maintained and overgrown. In 1960, the house was leased to Peter Widdowson, who, with a partner from London, made some repairs to the house and grounds, operating it as an apartment building, hotel and public house. Later, the Forestry Commission sold the house to John Haire, Baron Haire of Whiteabbey but kept the estate lands which now make up a large part of Thetford Forest.

It was bought by Gerald F. Rand in 1970 who converted the house into a private home cum motel, with function facilities. He also developed a mobile home park to the east of the house with some 40 plots. During his ownership the BBC filmed several programmes there, including 'Allo 'Allo!, Dad's Army and You Rang, M'Lord?. After 25 years Rand sold the property, complete with businesses, in the mid-1990s.

The British Comedy Society unveiled a blue plaque at Lynford Hall to remember the World War Two-set sitcom 'Allo 'Allo! at an event which saw many of the cast reunited on 7 September 2019.

Lynford has been a hotel and conference centre for some years.

== Notes ==
- Jenefer Roberts Glass: The Strange History of the Lyne Stephens Fortune Templeton Press 2003
