= West Tofts =

Deserted human settlement in Breckland, Norfolk, England

Coordinates: 52°30′01.2″N 0°42′15.6″E

- Village
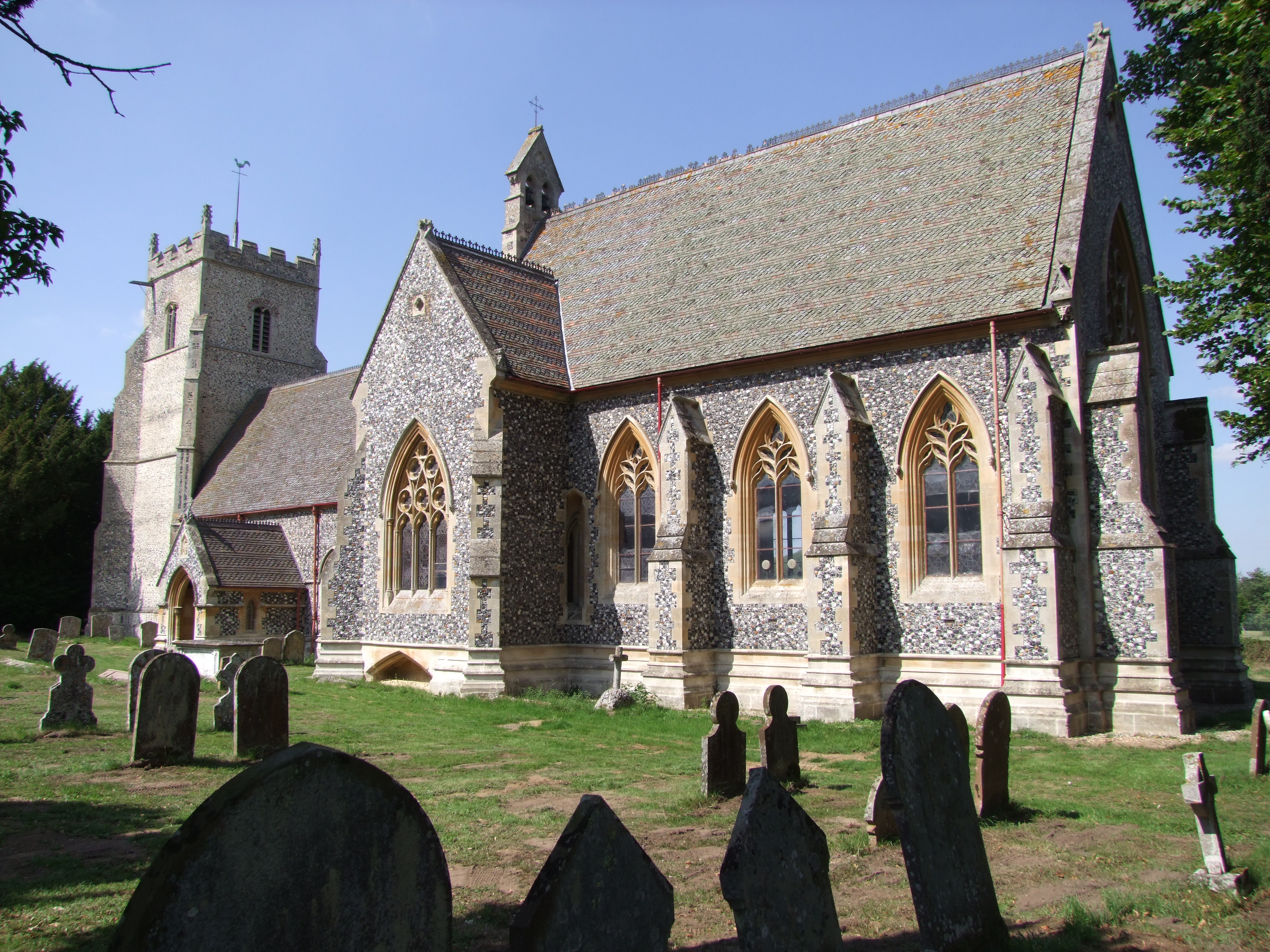
- St Mary's Church, West Tofts

- Location within Norfolk
- OS grid reference: TL 8360 9301
- Civil parish: Lynford
- District: Breckland
- Shire county: Norfolk
- Region: East
- Country: England
- Sovereign state: United Kingdom
- Post town: THETFORD
- Postcode district: IP24
- Dialling code: 01842
- UK Parliament: South West Norfolk

West Tofts is a deserted medieval village in the civil parish of Lynford, within the Breckland district, in the county of Norfolk, England. It is within the Stanford Training Area, an army training area. In 1931 the parish had a population of 332. On 1 April 1935 the parish was abolished and merged with Lynford.

St Mary's Church is a Grade I listed building with chancel and south chapel designed by A. W. N. Pugin c.1850 for the Rev. Augustus Sutton. The village was emparked in the 18th century. Records dating back to 1391 indicate human settlement at West Tofts. Earthworks at West Tofts indicate the presence of a former rectory or similar country house along with its gardens and parkland. Built before 1797, the West Tofts country house was constructed to replace Caston Hall. It subsequently became the rectory, but was demolished after the Second World War, though a wall dating from the 19th century, used as part of its vinery, is still standing.

The village became officially deserted when it was taken over by the British Army in 1942 during the Second World War, becoming part of the much larger Stanford Battle Area, an infantry training area that is still in use. The area of the former village, now known as West Tofts Army Camp, and most of the parish are within a prohibited area owned and controlled by the Ministry of Defence (MoD). Public access is not allowed without special permission from the Army.

A 500,000-year-old stone hand axe which contains a Cretaceous bivalve mollusc, Spondylus spinosus fossil shell incorporated, was found here in 1911. It is now in the Museum of Archaeology and Anthropology at Cambridge.

== Army camp ==
A camp was known to exist at West Tofts before 1935 to house refugees from Belgium. In 1935, the Ministry of Labour, a department of the UK Government, started construction of a labour camp of Nissen huts to house unemployed workers from the north of England, at the same time becoming an army camp. Two Second World War-era air raid shelters were also constructed.
