= Listed buildings in South Norfolk District =

Protected structures in Norfolk, England

There are around 2,950 listed buildings in the South Norfolk district, which are buildings of architectural or historic interest.

- Grade I buildings are of exceptional interest.
- Grade II* buildings are particularly important buildings of more than special interest.
- Grade II buildings are of special interest.

The lists follow Historic England’s geographical organisation, with entries grouped by county, local authority, and parish (civil and non-civil). The following lists are arranged by parish.

Parish	List of listed buildings	Grade I	Grade II*	Grade II	Total
Alburgh	Listed buildings in Alburgh				
Aldeby	Listed buildings in Aldeby				
Alpington	Listed buildings in Alpington				
Ashby St. Mary	Listed buildings in Ashby St. Mary				
Ashwellthorpe and Fundenhall	Listed buildings in Ashwellthorpe and Fundenhall				
Aslacton	Listed buildings in Aslacton				
Barford	Listed buildings in Barford, Norfolk				
Barnham Broom	Listed buildings in Barnham Broom				
Bawburgh	Listed buildings in Bawburgh				
Bedingham	Listed buildings in Bedingham				
Bergh Apton	Listed buildings in Bergh Apton				
Bixley	Listed buildings in Bixley				
Bracon Ash	Listed buildings in Bracon Ash				
Bramerton	Listed buildings in Bramerton				
Brandon Parva	Listed buildings in Brandon Parva				
Coston	Listed buildings in Coston				
Bressingham	Listed buildings in Bressingham				
Brockdish	Listed buildings in Brockdish				
Brooke	Listed buildings in Brooke, Norfolk				
Broome	Listed buildings in Broome, Norfolk				
Bunwell	Listed buildings in Bunwell				
Burgh St. Peter	Listed buildings in Burgh St. Peter				
Burston and Shimpling	Listed buildings in Burston and Shimpling				
Caistor St. Edmund	Listed buildings in Caistor St. Edmund				
Carleton Rode	Listed buildings in Carleton Rode				
Carleton St. Peter	Listed buildings in Carleton St. Peter				
Chedgrave	Listed buildings in Chedgrave				
Claxton	Listed buildings in Claxton, Norfolk				
Colney	Listed buildings in Colney				
Costessey	Listed buildings in Costessey				
Cringleford	Listed buildings in Cringleford				
Denton	Listed buildings in Denton, Norfolk				
Deopham	Listed buildings in Deopham				
Dickleburgh and Rushall	Listed buildings in Dickleburgh and Rushall				
Diss, Norfolk	Listed buildings in Diss, Norfolk				
Ditchingham	Listed buildings in Ditchingham				
Earsham	Listed buildings in Earsham				
East Carleton	Listed buildings in East Carleton				
Easton	Listed buildings in Easton, Norfolk				
Ellingham	Listed buildings in Ellingham, Norfolk				
Earsham	Listed buildings in Earsham				
East Carleton	Listed buildings in East Carleton				
Easton	Listed buildings in Easton, Norfolk				
Ellingham	Listed buildings in Ellingham, Norfolk				
Flordon	Listed buildings in Flordon				
Forncett	Listed buildings in Forncett				
Framingham Earl	Listed buildings in Framingham Earl				
Framingham Pigot	Listed buildings in Framingham Pigot				
Geldeston	Listed buildings in Geldeston				
Gillingham	Listed buildings in Gillingham, Norfolk				
Gissing	Listed buildings in Gissing, Norfolk				
Great Melton	Listed buildings in Great Melton				
Great Moulton	Listed buildings in Great Moulton				
Haddiscoe	Listed buildings in Haddiscoe				
Hales	Listed buildings in Hales				
Heckingham	Listed buildings in Heckingham				
Hedenham	Listed buildings in Hedenham				
Hellington	Listed buildings in Hellington				
Hempnall	Listed buildings in Hempnall				
Hethersett	Listed buildings in Hethersett				
Heywood	Listed buildings in Heywood, Norfolk				
Hingham	Listed buildings in Hingham, Norfolk				
Holverston	Listed buildings in Holverston				
Howe	Listed buildings in Howe, Norfolk				
Keswick and Intwood	Listed buildings in Keswick and Intwood				
Ketteringham	Listed buildings in Ketteringham				
Kimberley	Listed buildings in Kimberley, Norfolk				
Kirby Bedon	Listed buildings in Kirby Bedon				
Kirby Cane	Listed buildings in Kirby Cane				
Kirstead	Listed buildings in Kirstead				
Langley with Hardley	Listed buildings in Langley with Hardley				
Little Melton	Listed buildings in Little Melton				
Loddon	Listed buildings in Loddon, Norfolk				
Long Stratton	Listed buildings in Long Stratton				
Marlingford and Colton	Listed buildings in Marlingford and Colton				
Morley	Listed buildings in Morley, Norfolk				
Morningthorpe and Fritton	Listed buildings in Morningthorpe and Fritton				
Mulbarton	Listed buildings in Mulbarton, Norfolk				
Mundham	Listed buildings in Mundham				
Needham	Listed buildings in Needham, Norfolk				
Newton Flotman	Listed buildings in Newton Flotman				
Norton Subcourse	Listed buildings in Norton Subcourse				
Poringland	Listed buildings in Poringland				
Pulham Market	Listed buildings in Pulham Market				
Pulham St. Mary	Listed buildings in Pulham St. Mary				
Raveningham	Listed buildings in Raveningham				
Redenhall with Harleston	Listed buildings in Redenhall with Harleston				
Rockland St. Mary	Listed buildings in Rockland St. Mary				
Roydon	Listed buildings in Roydon, South Norfolk				
Runhall and Welborne	Listed buildings in Runhall and Welborne				
Saxlingham Nethergate	Listed buildings in Saxlingham Nethergate				
Scole	Listed buildings in Scole				
Seething	Listed buildings in Seething				
Shelfanger	Listed buildings in Shelfanger				
Shelton and Hardwick	Listed buildings in Shelton and Hardwick				
Shotesham	Listed buildings in Shotesham				
Sisland	Listed buildings in Sisland				
Starston	Listed buildings in Starston				
Stockton	Listed buildings in Stockton, Norfolk				
Stoke Holy Cross	Listed buildings in Stoke Holy Cross				
Surlingham	Listed buildings in Surlingham				
Swainsthorpe	Listed buildings in Swainsthorpe				
Swardeston	Listed buildings in Swardeston				
Tacolneston	Listed buildings in Tacolneston				
Tasburgh	Listed buildings in Tasburgh				
Tharston and Hapton	Listed buildings in Tharston and Hapton				
Thurlton	Listed buildings in Thurlton				
Thurton	Listed buildings in Thurton				
Thwaite St Mary	Listed buildings in Thwaite St Mary				
Tibenham	Listed buildings in Tibenham, Norfolk				
Tivetshall St Margaret	Listed buildings in Tivetshall St Margaret				
Tivetshall St. Mary	Listed buildings in Tivetshall St. Mary				
Toft Monks	Listed buildings in Toft Monks				
Topcroft	Listed buildings in Topcroft				
Trowse with Newton	Listed buildings in Trowse with Newton				
Wacton	Listed buildings in Wacton, Norfolk				
Wheatacre	Listed buildings in Wheatacre				
Wicklewood	Listed buildings in Wicklewood				
Winfarthing	Listed buildings in Winfarthing				
Woodton	Listed buildings in Woodton				
Wortwell	Listed buildings in Wortwell				
Wramplingham	Listed buildings in Wramplingham				
Wreningham	Listed buildings in Wreningham				
Wymondham	Listed buildings in Wymondham				
Yelverton	Listed buildings in Yelverton, Norfolk				

== See also ==
- Grade I listed buildings in Norfolk
- Grade II* listed buildings in Norfolk

== Sources ==
- Wilson, Bill; Pevsner, Nikolaus (1999) [1962], Norfolk 2: North-West and South, The Buildings of England, New Haven and London: Yale University Press, ISBN 978-0-300-09657-6
