= Listed buildings in Dickleburgh and Rushall =

Non-Civil Parish in Norfolk, England

Dickleburgh and Rushall is a village and civil parish in the South Norfolk district of Norfolk, England. It contains 87 listed buildings that are recorded in the National Heritage List for England. Of these two are grade I, one is grade II* and 84 are grade II.

This list is based on the information retrieved online from Historic England.

== Key ==
Grade	Criteria
I	Buildings that are of exceptional interest
II*	Particularly important buildings of more than special interest
II	Buildings that are of special interest

== Listing ==
Name	Grade	Location	Type	Completed (Note: The date given is the date used by Historic England as significant for the initial building or that of an important part in the structure's description.)	Date designated	Grid ref. (Note: The grid reference is based on the British national grid reference system, sometimes known as OSGB36, used by the Ordnance Survey.) Geo-coordinates	Notes	Entry number (Note: The "List Entry Number" is a unique number assigned to each listed building and scheduled monument by Historic England.)	Image	Wikidata
Old Post Office House	II				4 March 1977	TM1998982779; 52°23′56″N 1°13′56″E		1152349	Upload Photo	Q26445283
Barn Immediately North-west of Weggs Farmhouse	II	Common Road			4 March 1977	TM1683881785; 52°23′28″N 1°11′07″E		1049578	Upload Photo	Q26301604
Wegg's Farmhouse	II	Common Road			26 June 1981	TM1685281767; 52°23′27″N 1°11′08″E		1152013	Upload Photo	Q26444974
No 135	II	135, Dickleburgh Moor			4 March 1977	TM1753183492; 52°24′22″N 1°11′48″E		1050405	Upload Photo	Q26302391
Dickleburgh Hall	II	Dickleburgh Moor			11 September 1951	TM1766083654; 52°24′27″N 1°11′55″E		1049580	Upload Photo	Q26301606
Lowbrook Farmhouse	II	Dickleburgh Moor			4 March 1977	TM1780283594; 52°24′25″N 1°12′02″E		1152029	Upload Photo	Q26444990
Mellbreak House	II	Dickleburgh Moor			4 March 1977	TM1702283110; 52°24′11″N 1°11′20″E		1373194	Upload Photo	Q26654195
Moor Cottages	II	Dickleburgh Moor			4 March 1977	TM1751483488; 52°24′22″N 1°11′47″E		1050406	Upload Photo	Q26302392
Moor Farmhouse	II	Dickleburgh Moor			4 March 1977	TM1774783307; 52°24′16″N 1°11′59″E		1049579	Upload Photo	Q26301605
Orchard Farmhouse	II	Dickleburgh Moor			4 March 1977	TM1707583412; 52°24′20″N 1°11′23″E		1050409	Upload Photo	Q26302395
Red House	II	Dickleburgh Moor			4 March 1977	TM1703983253; 52°24′15″N 1°11′21″E		1050410	Upload Photo	Q26302396
Stables Immediately South of the Beeches	II	Dickleburgh Moor			4 March 1977	TM1723783567; 52°24′25″N 1°11′32″E		1373233	Upload Photo	Q26654231
The Beeches	II	Dickleburgh Moor			4 March 1977	TM1724783589; 52°24′26″N 1°11′33″E		1050408	Upload Photo	Q26302394
Tudor Rose Cottage	II	Dickleburgh Moor			4 March 1977	TM1735583531; 52°24′24″N 1°11′39″E		1050407	Upload Photo	Q26302393
Levett Cottage	II	Harvey Lane, Dickleburgh, IP21 4NL			4 March 1977	TM1708382179; 52°23′40″N 1°11′21″E		1050415	Upload Photo	Q26302401
Albion House	II	High Common			4 March 1977	TM1743281706; 52°23′25″N 1°11′38″E		1152108	Upload Photo	Q26445061
Common Farmhouse	II	High Common			4 March 1977	TM1727081705; 52°23′25″N 1°11′30″E		1050411	Upload Photo	Q26302397
Cottage Immediately East of Common Farmhouse	II	High Common			4 March 1977	TM1733481708; 52°23′25″N 1°11′33″E		1373195	Upload Photo	Q26654196
Barn Immediately East of Green Farmhouse	II	Langmere			4 March 1977	TM1856482004; 52°23′33″N 1°12′39″E		1050413	Upload Photo	Q26302399
Lakes Farmhouse	II	Langmere			4 March 1977	TM1861582432; 52°23′46″N 1°12′43″E		1152119	Upload Photo	Q26445070
Rose Farmhouse	II	Langmere			4 March 1977	TM1807981404; 52°23′14″N 1°12′12″E		1050414	Upload Photo	Q26302400
Barn South-west of Langmere Hall	II	Langmere Green			4 March 1977	TM1864281987; 52°23′32″N 1°12′43″E		1152115	Upload Photo	Q26445067
Green Farmhouse	II	Langmere Green, Langmere			4 March 1977	TM1854482006; 52°23′33″N 1°12′38″E		1373196	Upload Photo	Q26654197
Langmere Hall	II	Langmere Green, Langmere			7 December 1959	TM1866782001; 52°23′32″N 1°12′44″E		1050412	Upload Photo	Q26302398
1 and 2, Langmere Road	II	1 and 2, Langmere Road			4 March 1977	TM1679782298; 52°23′45″N 1°11′06″E		1373197	Upload Photo	Q26654198
Garden Cottage	II	Langmere Road			4 March 1977	TM1681282324; 52°23′45″N 1°11′07″E		1152124	Upload Photo	Q26445075
Ivanhoe	II	Langmere Road			4 March 1977	TM1764181916; 52°23′31″N 1°11′50″E		1373198	Upload Photo	Q26654199
Ivy House	II	Langmere Road			4 March 1977	TM1685482224; 52°23′42″N 1°11′09″E		1152146	Upload Photo	Q26445094
Oak Cottage	II	Langmere Road			4 March 1977	TM1683482284; 52°23′44″N 1°11′08″E		1152134	Upload Photo	Q26445083
Cottages Occupied by Mr Fairweather, Miss Fewing and Mr Taylor	II	Miss Fewing And Mr Taylor, Norwich Road			4 March 1977	TM1686082468; 52°23′50″N 1°11′10″E		1152218	Upload Photo	Q26445158
Church Cottage	II	Norwich Road			4 March 1977	TM1680882390; 52°23′48″N 1°11′07″E		1373202	Upload Photo	Q26654202
Church View	II	Norwich Road			4 March 1977	TM1680682381; 52°23′47″N 1°11′07″E		1152221	Upload Photo	Q26445161
Church of All Saints	I	Norwich Road	church building		7 December 1959	TM1677982423; 52°23′49″N 1°11′06″E		1373199	Church of All Saints More images	Q17524618
Crown Public House	II	Norwich Road	pub		4 March 1977	TM1679782350; 52°23′46″N 1°11′06″E		1152226	Crown Public House More images	Q26445165
East Bank	II	Norwich Road			4 March 1977	TM1675182298; 52°23′45″N 1°11′04″E		1050419	Upload Photo	Q26302405
House Occupied by Mr Stapleton (opposite and Immediately East of East Bank)	II	Norwich Road			4 March 1977	TM1677682285; 52°23′44″N 1°11′05″E		1050425	Upload Photo	Q26302411
House Occupied by Mr and Mrs Bloomfield Immediately South of Crown Public House	II	Norwich Road			4 March 1977	TM1678982340; 52°23′46″N 1°11′06″E		1050423	Upload Photo	Q26302409
Ivy Cottage and Cottages Occupied by Mr Balomfield and Mr Abon	II	Norwich Road			4 March 1977	TM1685782578; 52°23′54″N 1°11′10″E		1050420	Upload Photo	Q26302406
King's Head Inn	II	Norwich Road			4 March 1977	TM1682682475; 52°23′50″N 1°11′08″E		1152183	Upload Photo	Q26445126
Manor Farmhouse	II	Norwich Road			4 March 1977	TM1663182023; 52°23′36″N 1°10′57″E		1373201	Upload Photo	Q26654201
Manor House	II*	Norwich Road			11 September 1951	TM1657681889; 52°23′32″N 1°10′54″E		1304866	Upload Photo	Q17532692
Milestone Cottage	II	Norwich Road			4 March 1977	TM1683882506; 52°23′51″N 1°11′09″E		1050417	Upload Photo	Q26302403
Mount Pleasant	II	Norwich Road			4 March 1977	TM1682682586; 52°23′54″N 1°11′08″E		1050416	Upload Photo	Q26302402
Mr Wilby's Cottages Immediately South-east of Church of All Saints	II	Norwich Road			4 March 1977	TM1678682371; 52°23′47″N 1°11′06″E		1050418	Upload Photo	Q26302404
Myrtle Cottage	II	Norwich Road			4 March 1977	TM1675782315; 52°23′45″N 1°11′04″E		1304864	Upload Photo	Q26591794
Pavement House	II	Norwich Road			4 March 1977	TM1678582318; 52°23′45″N 1°11′06″E		1050424	Upload Photo	Q26302410
Post Office	II	Norwich Road			4 March 1977	TM1676582318; 52°23′45″N 1°11′05″E		1373200	Upload Photo	Q26654200
Rose Cottage	II	Norwich Road			4 March 1977	TM1683382537; 52°23′52″N 1°11′09″E		1152163	Upload Photo	Q26445110
School Immediately to South-west of Church of All Saints	II	Norwich Road			4 March 1977	TM1675282410; 52°23′48″N 1°11′04″E		1304894	Upload Photo	Q26591822
Shape Cottage	II	Norwich Road			4 March 1977	TM1686082482; 52°23′51″N 1°11′10″E		1050421	Upload Photo	Q26302407
The Forge	II	Norwich Road			4 March 1977	TM1677582340; 52°23′46″N 1°11′05″E		1152206	Upload Photo	Q26445147
The Old Bakery (premises of G W Arnold and Son)	II	Norwich Road			4 March 1977	TM1680282372; 52°23′47″N 1°11′07″E		1050422	Upload Photo	Q26302408
The Stores (premises Occupied by C J Blyth)	II	Norwich Road			4 March 1977	TM1678282309; 52°23′45″N 1°11′05″E		1304862	Upload Photo	Q26591792
Westview	II	Norwich Road			4 March 1977	TM1685182494; 52°23′51″N 1°11′09″E		1304869	Upload Photo	Q26591797
Rectory Farmhouse	II	Rectory Lane, Dickleburgh, IP21 4PS			4 March 1977	TM1779582384; 52°23′46″N 1°11′59″E		1050386	Upload Photo	Q26302373
13 and 15, Rectory Road	II	13 and 15, Rectory Road			4 March 1977	TM1693682439; 52°23′49″N 1°11′14″E		1050426	Upload Photo	Q26302412
Mill House	II	34, Rectory Road			4 March 1977	TM1714582386; 52°23′47″N 1°11′25″E		1050385	Upload Photo	Q26302372
Former Old White Horse Public House	II	Rectory Road			4 March 1977	TM1807282641; 52°23′54″N 1°12′14″E		1373222	Upload Photo	Q26654220
House Immediately West of the Gables	II	Rectory Road			4 March 1977	TM1698382436; 52°23′49″N 1°11′16″E		1050383	Upload Photo	Q26302370
The Gables	II	Rectory Road			4 March 1977	TM1700582441; 52°23′49″N 1°11′18″E		1050384	Upload Photo	Q26302371
Barn Immediately East of Johnson's Farmhouse	II	Rushall			4 March 1977	TM2115682791; 52°23′54″N 1°14′58″E		1373227	Upload Photo	Q26654225
Brook Farmhouse and Adjoining Barn to East	II	Rushall			4 March 1977	TM2125883030; 52°24′02″N 1°15′04″E		1152378	Upload Photo	Q26445307
Church of St Mary	I	Rushall	church building		7 December 1959	TM1976882652; 52°23′52″N 1°13′44″E		1050387	Church of St Mary More images	Q17537466
College Farmhouse	II	Rushall			11 September 1951	TM1961882689; 52°23′53″N 1°13′36″E		1050389	Upload Photo	Q26302375
Cottage Immediately East of Mr Griffin's Cottage	II	Rushall			4 March 1977	TM2035382740; 52°23′54″N 1°14′15″E		1152367	Upload Photo	Q26445297
Cottage to South of Half Moon Inn	II	Rushall			4 March 1977	TM1988582735; 52°23′54″N 1°13′50″E		1304843	Upload Photo	Q26591773
Half Moon Inn	II	Rushall			4 March 1977	TM1988582778; 52°23′56″N 1°13′50″E		1050391	Half Moon Inn More images	Q26302378
House Immediately North of Church of St Mary	II	Rushall			4 March 1977	TM1973482691; 52°23′53″N 1°13′42″E		1050388	Upload Photo	Q26302374
Hunts Cottage	II	Rushall			4 March 1977	TM1994982901; 52°24′00″N 1°13′54″E		1050392	Upload Photo	Q26302379
Johnson's Farmhouse	II	Rushall			4 March 1977	TM2113582791; 52°23′54″N 1°14′56″E		1304785	Upload Photo	Q26591723
Leist's Farmhouse	II	Rushall			4 March 1977	TM1998482810; 52°23′57″N 1°13′56″E		1373225	Upload Photo	Q26654223
Little Green Cottages	II	Rushall			4 March 1977	TM1978783033; 52°24′04″N 1°13′46″E		1373226	Upload Photo	Q26654224
Nortons Farmhouse	II	Rushall			4 March 1977	TM1953882169; 52°23′37″N 1°13′31″E		1050390	Upload Photo	Q26302376
Priory Farmhouse	II	Rushall			4 March 1977	TM2087882151; 52°23′34″N 1°14′41″E		1050394	Upload Photo	Q26302381
Rushall Hall	II	Rushall			4 March 1977	TM1984982453; 52°23′45″N 1°13′48″E		1373224	Upload Photo	Q26654222
Scotland Yard	II	Rushall			4 March 1977	TM1969482637; 52°23′51″N 1°13′40″E		1373223	Upload Photo	Q26654221
St Clements	II	Rushall			4 March 1977	TM1945282186; 52°23′37″N 1°13′26″E		1152332	Upload Photo	Q26445267
Willow Farmhouse Including Outhouse Immediately South	II	Rushall			4 March 1977	TM2058782623; 52°23′50″N 1°14′27″E		1050393	Upload Photo	Q26302380
Barnacre Cottage	II	Semere Green			4 March 1977	TM1846884382; 52°24′50″N 1°12′39″E		1152385	Upload Photo	Q26445314
Rosella	II	Semere Green			4 March 1977	TM1831584262; 52°24′46″N 1°12′31″E		1050395	Upload Photo	Q26302382
Semere Green Farmhouse	II	Semere Green			4 March 1977	TM1826184238; 52°24′45″N 1°12′28″E		1152392	Upload Photo	Q26445321
Whitehouse Farmhouse	II	Shimpling Road			4 March 1977	TM1633982193; 52°23′42″N 1°10′42″E		1373228	Upload Photo	Q26654226
Dickleburgh War Memorial	II	The Street, Dickleburgh, IP21 4NQ	war memorial		27 June 2017	TM1680282415; 52°23′48″N 1°11′07″E		1442617	Dickleburgh War Memorial More images	Q66478491
K6 Telephone Kiosk at Rushall	II	The Street, Rushall, IP21 4QD			3 April 2017	TM1995482794; 52°23′56″N 1°13′54″E		1442911	Upload Photo	Q66478525
Locksford Cottage	II	The Street, Dickleburgh, IP21 4NQ			4 March 1977	TM1679882363; 52°23′47″N 1°11′06″E		1373203	Upload Photo	Q26654203
The Old Harness Shop	II	The Street, Dickleburgh, IP21 4NQ			4 March 1977	TM1678882328; 52°23′46″N 1°11′06″E		1304872	Upload Photo	Q26591800
Control Tower	II	Thorpe Abbotts Airfield, Thorpe Abbots Airfield			9 August 2006	TM1871981328; 52°23′11″N 1°12′45″E		1391732	Upload Photo	Q26671085

== See also ==
- Grade I listed buildings in Norfolk
- Grade II* listed buildings in Norfolk

== Sources ==
- Wilson, Bill; Pevsner, Nikolaus (1999) [1962], Norfolk 2: North-West and South, The Buildings of England, New Haven and London: Yale University Press, ISBN 978-0-300-09657-6
