= Listed buildings in Brockdish =

Non-Civil Parish in Norfolk, England

Brockdish is a village and civil parish in the South Norfolk district of Norfolk, England. It contains 48 listed buildings that are recorded in the National Heritage List for England. Of these two are grade I, two are grade II* and 44 are grade II.

This list is based on the information retrieved online from Historic England.

== Key ==
Grade	Criteria
I	Buildings that are of exceptional interest
II*	Particularly important buildings of more than special interest
II	Buildings that are of special interest

== Listing ==
Name	Grade	Location	Type	Completed (Note: The date given is the date used by Historic England as significant for the initial building or that of an important part in the structure's description.)	Date designated	Grid ref. (Note: The grid reference is based on the British national grid reference system, sometimes known as OSGB36, used by the Ordnance Survey.) Geo-coordinates	Notes	Entry number (Note: The "List Entry Number" is a unique number assigned to each listed building and scheduled monument by Historic England.)	Image	Wikidata
1 the Street, Brockdish	II	1 The Street, IP21 4JY			26 June 1981	TM2127979609; 52°22′11″N 1°14′57″E		1170868	Upload Photo	Q26464550
The Olde Coach House	II	22 The Street, IP21 4JY			26 June 1981	TM2138179652; 52°22′13″N 1°15′02″E		1170858	Upload Photo	Q26464539
Home Farmhouse	II	Brockdish Road, Thorpe Abbotts			26 June 1981	TM1979179784; 52°22′19″N 1°13′38″E		1049625	Upload Photo	Q26301652
K6 Telephone Kiosk, Brockdish	II	Brockdish Village			18 November 1991	TM2125879583; 52°22′11″N 1°14′55″E		1252708	Upload Photo	Q26544544
Brockdish War Memorial	II	Church Lane, IP21 4JJ	war memorial		15 August 2017	TM2044879602; 52°22′12″N 1°14′13″E		1448376	Brockdish War Memorial More images	Q66478882
Church of St Peter and St Paul	I	Church Lane	church building		7 December 1959	TM2044279617; 52°22′13″N 1°14′12″E		1373573	Church of St Peter and St Paul More images	Q17524670
The Rectory	II	Church Lane			26 June 1981	TM2053179656; 52°22′14″N 1°14′17″E		1049626	Upload Photo	Q26301653
Sheriff House Restaurant	II	Common Lane			11 September 1951	TM2131579599; 52°22′11″N 1°14′58″E		1049627	Upload Photo	Q26301654
1 and 2, Grove Road	II	1 and 2, Grove Road			26 June 1981	TM2121379674; 52°22′14″N 1°14′53″E		1373576	Upload Photo	Q26654546
3 and 4, Grove Road	II	3 and 4, Grove Road			26 June 1981	TM2120979689; 52°22′14″N 1°14′53″E		1305971	Upload Photo	Q26592791
5, Grove Road	II	5, Grove Road			26 June 1981	TM2125179762; 52°22′16″N 1°14′55″E		1049630	Upload Photo	Q26301657
Bourn House	II	Grove Road			26 June 1981	TM2126579650; 52°22′13″N 1°14′56″E		1049628	Upload Photo	Q26301655
Brockdish Hall	II*	Grove Road			11 September 1951	TM2117580412; 52°22′37″N 1°14′53″E		1305933	Upload Photo	Q17532755
Crow Hall	II	Grove Road			26 June 1981	TM2119279894; 52°22′21″N 1°14′53″E		1049631	Upload Photo	Q26301658
Grove Thorpe	II	Grove Road			26 June 1981	TM2066680233; 52°22′32″N 1°14′26″E		1373577	Upload Photo	Q26654547
Kenthouse	II	Grove Road			26 June 1981	TM2125379713; 52°22′15″N 1°14′55″E		1305970	Upload Photo	Q26592790
Little Barn	II	Grove Road			26 June 1981	TM2126379623; 52°22′12″N 1°14′56″E		1373574	Upload Photo	Q26654544
Pantiles	II	Grove Road			26 June 1981	TM2125479705; 52°22′14″N 1°14′55″E		1049629	Upload Photo	Q26301656
The Grange	II*	Grove Road			19 September 1957	TM2024480020; 52°22′26″N 1°14′03″E		1049632	Upload Photo	Q17531482
The Grove	II	Grove Road			11 September 1951	TM2056480236; 52°22′33″N 1°14′20″E		1170726	Upload Photo	Q26464367
The Red House	II	Grove Road			26 June 1981	TM2126479672; 52°22′13″N 1°14′56″E		1373575	Upload Photo	Q26654545
Garden Boundary Wall North and North-west of Highfield Farmhouse	II	Mill Road, Thorpe Abbotts			26 June 1981	TM1930879687; 52°22′17″N 1°13′13″E		1373578	Upload Photo	Q26654548
Highfield Farmhouse	II	Mill Road, Thorpe Abbotts			26 June 1981	TM1932779673; 52°22′16″N 1°13′14″E		1170768	Upload Photo	Q26464432
Locks Pyghtle	II	Mill Road, Thorpe Abbotts			26 June 1981	TM1934580148; 52°22′32″N 1°13′16″E		1049634	Upload Photo	Q26301660
Village Pump and Shelter North of Yew Tree Cottage	II	Mill Road			26 June 1981	TM1941379798; 52°22′20″N 1°13′18″E		1305930	Upload Photo	Q26592754
Yew Tree Cottage	II	Mill Road, Thorpe Abbotts			26 June 1981	TM1942479759; 52°22′19″N 1°13′19″E		1049633	Upload Photo	Q26301659
Brockdish Antiques and Ivy Cottage	II	Scole Road			26 June 1981	TM2122179587; 52°22′11″N 1°14′53″E		1170789	Upload Photo	Q26464454
Church of All Saints	I	Scole Road, Thorpe Abbotts	church building		26 June 1981	TM1876378907; 52°21′52″N 1°12′42″E		1049636	Church of All Saints More images	Q17537421
Corner Farmhouse	II	Scole Road			26 June 1981	TM2124979571; 52°22′10″N 1°14′55″E		1049635	Upload Photo	Q26301661
Granary Immediately North-east of Thorpe Abbotts Hall	II	Scole Road, Thorpe Abbotts			26 June 1981	TM1868078964; 52°21′54″N 1°12′38″E		1373580	Upload Photo	Q26654550
Rose Cottage	II	Scole Road			26 June 1981	TM2121179584; 52°22′11″N 1°14′53″E		1373579	Upload Photo	Q26654549
Thorpe Abbotts Hall Or Hall Farmhouse	II	Scole Road, Thorpe Abbotts			26 June 1981	TM1865278908; 52°21′52″N 1°12′36″E		1170804	Upload Photo	Q26464478
Thorpe House	II	Scole Road, Thorpe Abbotts			26 June 1981	TM1911279099; 52°21′58″N 1°13′01″E		1305877	Upload Photo	Q26592704
White House Farmhouse	II	Scole Road			26 June 1981	TM2117079570; 52°22′10″N 1°14′51″E		1170796	Upload Photo	Q26464472
7 (the Old Bakery) and 9, the Street	II	9, The Street, IP21 4JY			26 June 1981	TM2131179616; 52°22′12″N 1°14′58″E		1170876	Upload Photo	Q26464558
10 and 11, the Street	II	10 and 11, The Street			26 June 1981	TM2137079641; 52°22′12″N 1°15′01″E		1373581	Upload Photo	Q26654551
Cottage Occupied by Miss Leftley and 2 Adjoining Cottages	II	The Street			26 June 1981	TM2144479740; 52°22′15″N 1°15′06″E		1049643	Upload Photo	Q26301668
Empton House	II	The Street			26 June 1981	TM2135679629; 52°22′12″N 1°15′01″E		1170854	Upload Photo	Q26464536
Greyhound Inn	II	The Street			11 September 1951	TM2129179609; 52°22′11″N 1°14′57″E		1049640	Upload Photo	Q26301665
Homestead and Avonside	II	The Street			26 June 1981	TM2140179674; 52°22′13″N 1°15′03″E		1049638	Upload Photo	Q26301663
King's Head Public House	II	The Street	pub		26 June 1981	TM2147979751; 52°22′16″N 1°15′07″E		1049639	King's Head Public House More images	Q26301664
Orchard End	II	The Street			26 June 1981	TM2133779637; 52°22′12″N 1°15′00″E		1305862	Upload Photo	Q26592689
Outbuilding Immediately North-east of Homestead	II	The Street			26 June 1981	TM2142079690; 52°22′14″N 1°15′04″E		1170861	Upload Photo	Q26464544
The Bakery	II	The Street			26 June 1981	TM2145779718; 52°22′15″N 1°15′06″E		1373582	Upload Photo	Q26654552
The Cottage	II	The Street			26 June 1981	TM2134379641; 52°22′12″N 1°15′00″E		1049642	Upload Photo	Q26301667
The Forge Cottage	II	The Street			26 June 1981	TM2135079647; 52°22′12″N 1°15′00″E		1305865	Upload Photo	Q26592692
The Pottery	II	The Street			26 June 1981	TM2129379589; 52°22′11″N 1°14′57″E		1049637	Upload Photo	Q26301662
White House	II	The Street			26 June 1981	TM2133179631; 52°22′12″N 1°14′59″E		1049641	Upload Photo	Q26301666

== See also ==
- Grade I listed buildings in Norfolk
- Grade II* listed buildings in Norfolk

== Sources ==
- Wilson, Bill; Pevsner, Nikolaus (1999) [1962], Norfolk 2: North-West and South, The Buildings of England, New Haven and London: Yale University Press, ISBN 978-0-300-09657-6
