= Listed buildings in Diss, Norfolk =

Non-Civil Parish in Norfolk, England

Diss is a town and civil parish in the South Norfolk district of Norfolk, England. It contains 157 listed buildings that are recorded in the National Heritage List for England. Of these one is grade I, two are grade II* and 154 are grade II.

This list is based on the information retrieved online from Historic England.

== Key ==
Grade	Criteria
I	Buildings that are of exceptional interest
II*	Particularly important buildings of more than special interest
II	Buildings that are of special interest

== Listing ==
Name	Grade	Location	Type	Completed (Note: The date given is the date used by Historic England as significant for the initial building or that of an important part in the structure's description.)	Date designated	Grid ref. (Note: The grid reference is based on the British national grid reference system, sometimes known as OSGB36, used by the Ordnance Survey.) Geo-coordinates	Notes	Entry number (Note: The "List Entry Number" is a unique number assigned to each listed building and scheduled monument by Historic England.)	Image	Wikidata
Diss Quaker Meeting House	II	12-14 Frenze Road, IP22 4PA			8 June 1972	TM1201779958; 52°22′36″N 1°06′48″E		1049735	Upload Photo	Q26301762
Franwin	II	19, Chapel Street			8 June 1972	TM1176879828; 52°22′32″N 1°06′35″E		1049755	Upload Photo	Q26301783
35-37, Chapel Street	II	35-37, Chapel Street			8 June 1972	TM1174879829; 52°22′32″N 1°06′34″E		1373520	Upload Photo	Q26654494
38, Chapel Street	II	38, Chapel Street			8 June 1972	TM1174979838; 52°22′32″N 1°06′34″E		1049756	Upload Photo	Q26301784
1, Church Street	II	1, Church Street			8 June 1972	TM1179680007; 52°22′38″N 1°06′37″E		1049758	Upload Photo	Q26301785
2 and 3, Church Street	II	2 and 3, Church Street			8 June 1972	TM1181579989; 52°22′37″N 1°06′38″E		1049759	Upload Photo	Q26301786
7, Church Street	II	7, Church Street			8 June 1972	TM1184379992; 52°22′37″N 1°06′39″E		1373523	Upload Photo	Q26654497
18, Church Street	II	18, Church Street			8 June 1972	TM1180879974; 52°22′37″N 1°06′37″E		1049760	Upload Photo	Q26301788
Dolphin Cottage	II	23, Church Street, IP22 4DD			8 June 1972	TM1173179978; 52°22′37″N 1°06′33″E		1049761	Upload Photo	Q26301789
Church of St Mary	I	Church Street	church building		29 December 1950	TM1172680021; 52°22′38″N 1°06′33″E		1049757	Church of St Mary More images	Q17537431
Churchyard Walls of St Marys Church	II	Church Street			8 June 1972	TM1175079987; 52°22′37″N 1°06′34″E		1373521	Upload Photo	Q26654495
Dolphin House	II*	Church Street, IP22 4DD	house		29 December 1950	TM1172879971; 52°22′37″N 1°06′33″E		1373524	Dolphin House More images	Q17533225
West Boundary Walls of No 1	II	Church Street			8 June 1972	TM1179179992; 52°22′37″N 1°06′36″E		1373522	Upload Photo	Q26654496
3-5, Denmark Street	II	3-5, Denmark Street			8 June 1972	TM1152979992; 52°22′38″N 1°06′23″E		1049762	Upload Photo	Q26301790
7-9, Denmark Street	II	7-9, Denmark Street			8 June 1972	TM1151479943; 52°22′36″N 1°06′22″E		1306310	Upload Photo	Q26593103
19, Denmark Street	II	19, Denmark Street			8 June 1972	TM1142179776; 52°22′31″N 1°06′16″E		1049763	Upload Photo	Q26301791
23 and 24, Denmark Street	II	23 and 24, Denmark Street			8 June 1972	TM1135579718; 52°22′29″N 1°06′13″E		1049764	Upload Photo	Q26301792
25, Denmark Street	II	25, Denmark Street			8 June 1972	TM1135379711; 52°22′29″N 1°06′13″E		1169891	Upload Photo	Q26463072
26-28, Denmark Street	II	26-28, Denmark Street			8 June 1972	TM1133779709; 52°22′29″N 1°06′12″E		1373526	Upload Photo	Q26654499
Park Hotel	II	29, Denmark Street			8 June 1972	TM1131979690; 52°22′28″N 1°06′11″E		1169894	Upload Photo	Q26463077
32, Denmark Street	II	32, Denmark Street			8 June 1972	TM1124179618; 52°22′26″N 1°06′07″E		1373527	Upload Photo	Q26654500
37-45, Denmark Street	II	37-45, Denmark Street			8 June 1972	TM1122479581; 52°22′25″N 1°06′06″E		1169899	Upload Photo	Q26463083
47-49, Denmark Street	II	47-49, Denmark Street			8 June 1972	TM1121679546; 52°22′24″N 1°06′05″E		1049766	Upload Photo	Q26301794
50, Denmark Street	II	50, Denmark Street			29 December 1950	TM1121379538; 52°22′23″N 1°06′05″E		1169903	Upload Photo	Q26463087
51 and 52, Denmark Street	II	51 and 52, Denmark Street			8 June 1972	TM1120879530; 52°22′23″N 1°06′05″E		1373528	Upload Photo	Q26654501
53 and 54, Denmark Street	II	53 and 54, Denmark Street			8 June 1972	TM1119879509; 52°22′22″N 1°06′04″E		1049767	Upload Photo	Q26301795
55 56, Denmark Street	II	55 56, Denmark Street			8 June 1972	TM1118579488; 52°22′22″N 1°06′03″E		1169910	Upload Photo	Q26463096
57 and 58, Denmark Street	II	57 and 58, Denmark Street			8 June 1972	TM1118179477; 52°22′21″N 1°06′03″E		1049768	Upload Photo	Q26301796
60 and 61, Denmark Street	II	60 and 61, Denmark Street			8 June 1972	TM1117579463; 52°22′21″N 1°06′03″E		1373529	Upload Photo	Q26654502
62 and 63, Denmark Street	II	62 and 63, Denmark Street	building		8 June 1972	TM1117079456; 52°22′21″N 1°06′02″E		1169921	62 and 63, Denmark Street More images	Q26463114
65-67, Denmark Street	II	65-67, Denmark Street			8 June 1972	TM1115979443; 52°22′20″N 1°06′02″E		1049769	Upload Photo	Q26301797
82 and 83, Denmark Street	II	82 and 83, Denmark Street			8 June 1972	TM1111279389; 52°22′19″N 1°05′59″E		1306292	Upload Photo	Q26593086
84-86, Denmark Street	II	84-86, Denmark Street			29 December 1950	TM1111779401; 52°22′19″N 1°06′00″E		1049770	Upload Photo	Q26301798
Oak Lodge	II	95, Denmark Street			8 June 1972	TM1140779828; 52°22′32″N 1°06′16″E		1049771	Upload Photo	Q26301799
Houghton House	II	99, Denmark Street			8 June 1972	TM1147479944; 52°22′36″N 1°06′20″E		1049774	Upload Photo	Q26301803
100-102, Denmark Street	II	100-102, Denmark Street			8 June 1972	TM1150979983; 52°22′37″N 1°06′22″E		1306269	Upload Photo	Q26593065
103, Denmark Street	II	103, Denmark Street			8 June 1972	TM1151179998; 52°22′38″N 1°06′22″E		1049775	Upload Photo	Q26301804
Denmark Street Hall	II	Denmark Street			8 June 1972	TM1142379850; 52°22′33″N 1°06′17″E		1049772	Upload Photo	Q26301800
Entrance Piers of Linden House	II	Denmark Street			8 June 1972	TM1148179899; 52°22′35″N 1°06′20″E		1049773	Upload Photo	Q26301802
Front Walls at Flanks of No 29	II	Denmark Street			8 June 1972	TM1130879688; 52°22′28″N 1°06′10″E		1049765	Upload Photo	Q26301793
Linden House	II	97a, Denmark Street			8 June 1972	TM1144879905; 52°22′35″N 1°06′18″E		1306267	Upload Photo	Q26593063
Masonic Hall	II	18a, Denmark Street			29 December 1950	TM1145479747; 52°22′30″N 1°06′18″E		1373525	Upload Photo	Q26654498
Railings of Enclosure of No 18a	II	Denmark Street			8 June 1972	TM1146179734; 52°22′29″N 1°06′18″E		1169885	Upload Photo	Q26463063
Walls and Gate Piers at Front Boundary at Oak Lodge	II	Denmark Street			8 June 1972	TM1142779812; 52°22′32″N 1°06′17″E		1306298	Upload Photo	Q26593092
Wall, East of Saracens Head Inn	II	East Of Saracens Head Inn, Mount Street			8 June 1972	TM1175580048; 52°22′39″N 1°06′35″E		1049721	Upload Photo	Q26301748
2 and 2a, Fair Green	II	2 and 2a, Fair Green			8 June 1972	TM1117979562; 52°22′24″N 1°06′03″E		1373530	Upload Photo	Q26654503
4, Fair Green	II	4, Fair Green			3 January 1975	TM1113979555; 52°22′24″N 1°06′01″E		1373570	Upload Photo	Q26654541
21, Fair Green	II	21, Fair Green			8 June 1972	TM1098479602; 52°22′26″N 1°05′53″E		1049776	Upload Photo	Q26301805
28 and 29, Fair Green	II	28 and 29, Fair Green			8 June 1972	TM1107579442; 52°22′20″N 1°05′57″E		1049732	Upload Photo	Q26301759
30 and 31, Fair Green	II	30 and 31, Fair Green			29 December 1950	TM1108979435; 52°22′20″N 1°05′58″E		1373548	Upload Photo	Q26654520
Cock Green Cottage	II	33, Fair Green			29 December 1950	TM1110279428; 52°22′20″N 1°05′59″E		1049733	Upload Photo	Q26301760
Hatters	II	34, Fair Green			29 December 1950	TM1111079423; 52°22′20″N 1°05′59″E		1373549	Upload Photo	Q26654521
Fair Green House	II	35 36, Fair Green			29 December 1950	TM1112179417; 52°22′20″N 1°06′00″E		1049734	Upload Photo	Q26301761
K6 Telephone Kiosk	II	Fair Green			16 September 1987	TM1115279460; 52°22′21″N 1°06′02″E		1049696	Upload Photo	Q26301722
2, Market Hill	II	2, Market Hill			8 June 1972	TM1167079998; 52°22′38″N 1°06′30″E		1170025	Upload Photo	Q26463276
4-6, Market Hill	II	4-6, Market Hill			8 June 1972	TM1164580009; 52°22′38″N 1°06′29″E		1049740	Upload Photo	Q26301767
8 and 9, Market Hill	II	8 and 9, Market Hill			8 June 1972	TM1162880023; 52°22′38″N 1°06′28″E		1373514	Upload Photo	Q26654489
11 and 12, Market Hill	II	11 and 12, Market Hill	city hall		29 December 1950	TM1163179994; 52°22′37″N 1°06′28″E		1170035	11 and 12, Market Hill More images	Q26463293
13, Market Hill	II	13, Market Hill			8 June 1972	TM1164279992; 52°22′37″N 1°06′29″E		1049741	Upload Photo	Q26301768
14 and 15, Market Hill	II	14 and 15, Market Hill			8 June 1972	TM1166079972; 52°22′37″N 1°06′30″E		1170045	Upload Photo	Q26463312
1a, 1b and 1c, Market Hill	II	1a, 1b and 1c, Market Hill			8 June 1972	TM1168379977; 52°22′37″N 1°06′31″E		1373513	Upload Photo	Q26654488
1-3, Market Place	II	1-3, Market Place			8 June 1972	TM1170380004; 52°22′38″N 1°06′32″E		1049742	Upload Photo	Q26301769
4 and 5, Market Place	II	4 and 5, Market Place			8 June 1972	TM1171279975; 52°22′37″N 1°06′32″E		1373515	Upload Photo	Q26654490
8, Market Place	II	8, Market Place			8 June 1972	TM1173079928; 52°22′35″N 1°06′33″E		1306241	Upload Photo	Q26593042
9, Market Place	II	9, Market Place			9 July 1970	TM1173579915; 52°22′35″N 1°06′33″E		1049743	Upload Photo	Q26301770
10, Market Place	II	10, Market Place			9 July 1970	TM1173479906; 52°22′35″N 1°06′33″E		1170067	Upload Photo	Q26463335
14, 15 and 15a, Market Place	II	14, 15 and 15a, Market Place			8 June 1972	TM1169579940; 52°22′36″N 1°06′31″E		1049744	Upload Photo	Q26301771
16 and 16a, Market Place	II	16 and 16a, Market Place			12 August 1970	TM1168879955; 52°22′36″N 1°06′31″E		1170095	Upload Photo	Q26463389
17, 17a and 18, Market Place (see Details for Further Address Information)	II	17, 17a and 18, Market Place			8 June 1972	TM1169179987; 52°22′37″N 1°06′31″E		1373517	Upload Photo	Q26654492
20, Market Place	II	20, Market Place	pub		8 June 1972	TM1169080008; 52°22′38″N 1°06′31″E		1170098	20, Market Place More images	Q26463396
K6 Telephone Kiosk	II	Market Place			16 September 1987	TM1172379942; 52°22′36″N 1°06′33″E		1334385	Upload Photo	Q26684974
Kings Head Hotel	II	Market Place			8 June 1972	TM1170779902; 52°22′34″N 1°06′32″E		1373516	Upload Photo	Q26654491
1, Mere Street	II	1, Mere Street			29 December 1950	TM1172579897; 52°22′34″N 1°06′33″E		1049745	Upload Photo	Q26301772
2 and 3, Mere Street	II	2 and 3, Mere Street			8 June 1972	TM1172679883; 52°22′34″N 1°06′33″E		1049746	Upload Photo	Q26301773
6, Mere Street	II	6, Mere Street			8 June 1972	TM1172779858; 52°22′33″N 1°06′33″E		1306222	Upload Photo	Q26593022
7 and 8, Mere Street	II	7 and 8, Mere Street			8 June 1972	TM1172779849; 52°22′33″N 1°06′33″E		1373518	Upload Photo	Q26654493
11 and 12, Mere Street	II	11 and 12, Mere Street			8 June 1972	TM1173079832; 52°22′32″N 1°06′33″E		1049747	Upload Photo	Q26301774
13-15, Mere Street	II	13-15, Mere Street			8 June 1972	TM1173179814; 52°22′32″N 1°06′33″E		1306224	Upload Photo	Q26593024
18, Mere Street	II	18, Mere Street			8 June 1972	TM1173679785; 52°22′31″N 1°06′33″E		1049748	Upload Photo	Q26301775
25-27, Mere Street	II	25-27, Mere Street			8 June 1972	TM1173179721; 52°22′29″N 1°06′33″E		1306190	Upload Photo	Q26592992
33-35, Mere Street	II	33-35, Mere Street			8 June 1972	TM1173479697; 52°22′28″N 1°06′33″E		1049749	Upload Photo	Q26301776
36 36a 36b, Mere Street	II	36 36a 36b, Mere Street			8 June 1972	TM1173779644; 52°22′26″N 1°06′33″E		1170132	Upload Photo	Q26463462
Park House	II	39, Mere Street			10 February 1970	TM1170179706; 52°22′28″N 1°06′31″E		1049751	Upload Photo	Q26301779
41, Mere Street	II	41, Mere Street			8 June 1972	TM1170679780; 52°22′30″N 1°06′32″E		1170137	Upload Photo	Q26463466
42, Mere Street	II	42, Mere Street			8 June 1972	TM1171379787; 52°22′31″N 1°06′32″E		1049752	Upload Photo	Q26301780
Sun Inn	II	43, Mere Street	pub		8 June 1972	TM1170279802; 52°22′31″N 1°06′31″E		1049753	Sun Inn More images	Q26301781
44 and 45, Mere Street	II	44 and 45, Mere Street			8 June 1972	TM1171279810; 52°22′31″N 1°06′32″E		1306168	Upload Photo	Q26592971
46 and 47, Mere Street (see Details for Further Address Information)	II	46 and 47, Mere Street			8 June 1972	TM1171579825; 52°22′32″N 1°06′32″E		1049754	Upload Photo	Q26301782
48-50, Mere Street	II	48-50, Mere Street			8 June 1972	TM1171479835; 52°22′32″N 1°06′32″E		1373537	Upload Photo	Q26654509
51-54, Mere Street	II	51-54, Mere Street			8 June 1972	TM1171279852; 52°22′33″N 1°06′32″E		1049710	Upload Photo	Q26301736
Congregational Church	II	Mere Street	church building		8 June 1972	TM1174479676; 52°22′27″N 1°06′33″E		1049750	Congregational Church More images	Q26301778
2, Mount Street	II*	2, Mount Street			8 June 1972	TM1169280057; 52°22′39″N 1°06′31″E		1049711	Upload Photo	Q17531508
3, Mount Street	II	3, Mount Street			8 June 1972	TM1170080076; 52°22′40″N 1°06′32″E		1373538	Upload Photo	Q26654510
10-13, Mount Street	II	10-13, Mount Street			8 June 1972	TM1172580119; 52°22′41″N 1°06′33″E		1049712	Upload Photo	Q26301737
14, 18, 18a and 19, Mount Street (see Details for Further Address Information)	II	14, 18, 18a and 19, Mount Street			8 June 1972	TM1174780159; 52°22′43″N 1°06′35″E		1373539	Upload Photo	Q26654511
23 and 24, Mount Street	II	23 and 24, Mount Street			8 June 1972	TM1178180237; 52°22′45″N 1°06′37″E		1049713	Upload Photo	Q26301738
26, Mount Street	II	26, Mount Street			8 June 1972	TM1178580269; 52°22′46″N 1°06′37″E		1373540	Upload Photo	Q26654512
29, Mount Street	II	29, Mount Street			8 June 1972	TM1178680299; 52°22′47″N 1°06′37″E		1049714	Upload Photo	Q26301739
30-33, Mount Street	II	30-33, Mount Street			8 June 1972	TM1178780322; 52°22′48″N 1°06′37″E		1049715	Upload Photo	Q26301740
34, Mount Street	II	34, Mount Street			8 June 1972	TM1179380333; 52°22′48″N 1°06′37″E		1373541	Upload Photo	Q26654513
35, Mount Street	II	35, Mount Street			8 June 1972	TM1178680341; 52°22′48″N 1°06′37″E		1049716	Upload Photo	Q26301742
Heywood Cottage	II	48, Mount Street			8 June 1972	TM1182280443; 52°22′52″N 1°06′39″E		1306187	Upload Photo	Q26592989
49 and 50, Mount Street	II	49 and 50, Mount Street			8 June 1972	TM1182580457; 52°22′52″N 1°06′39″E		1373542	Upload Photo	Q26654514
Eaton Lodge	II	51, Mount Street			8 June 1972	TM1186780447; 52°22′52″N 1°06′42″E		1170201	Upload Photo	Q26463528
The Grove	II	57, Mount Street			8 June 1972	TM1182380349; 52°22′49″N 1°06′39″E		1049717	Upload Photo	Q26301744
The Manor House	II	59, Mount Street			29 December 1950	TM1180580242; 52°22′45″N 1°06′38″E		1049718	Upload Photo	Q26301745
60, Mount Street	II	60, Mount Street			8 June 1972	TM1178580201; 52°22′44″N 1°06′37″E		1306153	Upload Photo	Q26592957
62, Mount Street	II	62, Mount Street			8 June 1972	TM1177480170; 52°22′43″N 1°06′36″E		1049719	Upload Photo	Q26301746
64 Mount Street	II	64, Mount Street, IP22 4QQ			8 June 1972	TM1177880152; 52°22′42″N 1°06′36″E		1373544	Upload Photo	Q26654516
68 and 69, Mount Street	II	68 and 69, Mount Street			8 June 1972	TM1174780119; 52°22′41″N 1°06′34″E		1170219	Upload Photo	Q26463547
Entrance Wall and Piers of Number 60	II	Mount Street			8 June 1972	TM1178980213; 52°22′44″N 1°06′37″E		1170212	Upload Photo	Q26463540
Garden Wall at Number 60	II	Mount Street			8 June 1972	TM1177780191; 52°22′44″N 1°06′36″E		1373543	Upload Photo	Q26654515
Saracens Head Inn	II	Mount Street	pub		8 June 1972	TM1171480059; 52°22′39″N 1°06′33″E		1049720	Saracens Head Inn More images	Q26301747
1 and 2, Roydon Road	II	1 and 2, Roydon Road			8 June 1972	TM1152180060; 52°22′40″N 1°06′22″E		1306128	Upload Photo	Q26592934
Brewery House	II	6, Roydon Road			19 November 1996	TM1148880074; 52°22′40″N 1°06′21″E		1267967	Upload Photo	Q26558319
1 and 2, Shelfanger Road	II	1 and 2, Shelfanger Road			8 June 1972	TM1153880060; 52°22′40″N 1°06′23″E		1373566	Upload Photo	Q26654537
52, Shelfanger Road	II	52, Shelfanger Road			8 June 1972	TM1151780358; 52°22′49″N 1°06′23″E		1373567	Upload Photo	Q26654538
Old Maltings	II	Shelfanger Road			8 June 1972	TM1151480128; 52°22′42″N 1°06′22″E		1049689	Upload Photo	Q26301715
Pine House	II	Shelfanger Road			8 June 1972	TM1154780086; 52°22′41″N 1°06′24″E		1170305	Upload Photo	Q26463660
2, St Nicholas Street	II	2, St Nicholas Street			8 June 1972	TM1168280031; 52°22′39″N 1°06′31″E		1373545	Upload Photo	Q26654517
3, St Nicholas Street	II	3, St Nicholas Street			8 June 1972	TM1167480030; 52°22′39″N 1°06′30″E		1170247	Upload Photo	Q26463575
4, St Nicholas Street	II	4, St Nicholas Street			8 June 1972	TM1166680029; 52°22′39″N 1°06′30″E		1049722	Upload Photo	Q26301749
5, St Nicholas Street	II	5, St Nicholas Street			8 June 1972	TM1165980030; 52°22′39″N 1°06′30″E		1373546	Upload Photo	Q26654518
6 and 6a, St Nicholas Street	II	6 and 6a, St Nicholas Street			8 June 1972	TM1164280036; 52°22′39″N 1°06′29″E		1306131	Upload Photo	Q26592937
7, St Nicholas Street	II	7, St Nicholas Street			9 May 1991	TM1162280041; 52°22′39″N 1°06′28″E		1096880	Upload Photo	Q26389143
8, St Nicholas Street	II	8, St Nicholas Street			8 June 1972	TM1161680037; 52°22′39″N 1°06′27″E		1049723	Upload Photo	Q26301750
9, St Nicholas Street	II	9, St Nicholas Street	building		29 December 1950	TM1160680040; 52°22′39″N 1°06′27″E		1373547	9, St Nicholas Street More images	Q26654519
The Two Brewers Inn	II	11, St Nicholas Street	inn		8 June 1972	TM1156880042; 52°22′39″N 1°06′25″E		1049724	The Two Brewers Inn More images	Q26301751
12 and 12a, St Nicholas Street	II	12 and 12a, St Nicholas Street			8 June 1972	TM1156280041; 52°22′39″N 1°06′25″E		1170266	Upload Photo	Q26463589
13, St Nicholas Street	II	13, St Nicholas Street			8 June 1972	TM1155280044; 52°22′39″N 1°06′24″E		1049725	Upload Photo	Q26301752
14, 14a and 14b, St Nicholas Street	II	14, 14a and 14b, St Nicholas Street			8 June 1972	TM1153980049; 52°22′39″N 1°06′23″E		1049726	Upload Photo	Q26301753
17 and 18, St Nicholas Street	II	17 and 18, St Nicholas Street			8 June 1972	TM1154080026; 52°22′39″N 1°06′23″E		1170274	Upload Photo	Q26463602
19 and 20, St Nicholas Street	II	19 and 20, St Nicholas Street			8 June 1972	TM1155780025; 52°22′39″N 1°06′24″E		1049727	Upload Photo	Q26301754
21, St Nicholas Street	II	21, St Nicholas Street			8 June 1972	TM1157180022; 52°22′38″N 1°06′25″E		1049728	Upload Photo	Q26301755
22, St Nicholas Street	II	22, St Nicholas Street			8 June 1972	TM1158380023; 52°22′38″N 1°06′26″E		1170280	Upload Photo	Q26463611
23 and 23a, St Nicholas Street	II	23 and 23a, St Nicholas Street			29 December 1950	TM1159480014; 52°22′38″N 1°06′26″E		1049729	Upload Photo	Q26301756
24, St Nicholas Street	II	24, St Nicholas Street			8 June 1972	TM1161480024; 52°22′38″N 1°06′27″E		1049730	Upload Photo	Q26301757
24a and 25, St Nicholas Street	II	24a and 25, St Nicholas Street			8 June 1972	TM1164980019; 52°22′38″N 1°06′29″E		1170291	Upload Photo	Q26463631
26, St Nicholas Street	II	26, St Nicholas Street			8 June 1972	TM1166380018; 52°22′38″N 1°06′30″E		1049731	Upload Photo	Q26301758
27, St Nicholas Street	II	27, St Nicholas Street			8 June 1972	TM1167280017; 52°22′38″N 1°06′30″E		1170296	Upload Photo	Q26463640
28, St Nicholas Street	II	28, St Nicholas Street			8 June 1972	TM1167980018; 52°22′38″N 1°06′31″E		1049688	Upload Photo	Q26301714
29, St Nicholas Street	II	29, St Nicholas Street			8 June 1972	TM1168780019; 52°22′38″N 1°06′31″E		1306114	Upload Photo	Q26592922
Corn Hall	II	St Nicholas Street	house		8 June 1972	TM1158780055; 52°22′40″N 1°06′26″E		1170255	Corn Hall More images	Q26463581
Wilderness Cottage	II	4, The Entry			23 May 1994	TM1195579913; 52°22′34″N 1°06′45″E		1271675	Upload Photo	Q26561606
6 and 7, the Entry	II	6 and 7, The Entry			8 June 1972	TM1187879950; 52°22′36″N 1°06′41″E		1169965	Upload Photo	Q26463183
2, Victoria Road	II	2, Victoria Road			8 June 1972	TM1174879634; 52°22′26″N 1°06′33″E		1170313	Upload Photo	Q26463675
5, Victoria Road	II	5, Victoria Road			8 June 1972	TM1184079616; 52°22′25″N 1°06′38″E		1049690	Upload Photo	Q26301716
6, Victoria Road	II	6, Victoria Road			8 June 1972	TM1189479618; 52°22′25″N 1°06′41″E		1170326	Upload Photo	Q26463705
Mere Manor	II	7, Victoria Road			29 December 1950	TM1200779681; 52°22′27″N 1°06′47″E		1049691	Upload Photo	Q26301717
98, Victoria Road	II	98, Victoria Road			8 June 1972	TM1227279374; 52°22′17″N 1°07′00″E		1373568	Upload Photo	Q26654539
Maltings	II	Victoria Road			8 June 1972	TM1273479171; 52°22′09″N 1°07′24″E		1049692	Upload Photo	Q26301718
Maltings	II	Vinces Lane			19 April 1977	TM1247079388; 52°22′17″N 1°07′11″E		1096872	Upload Photo	Q26389134
Algar's Farmhouse	II	Walcot Green			8 June 1972	TM1250580923; 52°23′06″N 1°07′16″E		1049693	Upload Photo	Q26301719
Home Farmhouse	II	Walcot Green			8 June 1972	TM1267580764; 52°23′01″N 1°07′25″E		1049695	Upload Photo	Q26301721
Homestead	II	Walcot Green			8 June 1972	TM1281880881; 52°23′04″N 1°07′33″E		1373569	Upload Photo	Q26654540
Summerley	II	Walcot Green			8 June 1972	TM1261480870; 52°23′04″N 1°07′22″E		1049694	Upload Photo	Q26301720
Thatch (cottage)	II	Walcot Green			8 June 1972	TM1258480748; 52°23′01″N 1°07′20″E		1306104	Upload Photo	Q26592912

== See also ==
- Grade I listed buildings in Norfolk
- Grade II* listed buildings in Norfolk

== Sources ==
- Wilson, Bill; Pevsner, Nikolaus (1999) [1962], Norfolk 2: North-West and South, The Buildings of England, New Haven and London: Yale University Press, ISBN 978-0-300-09657-6
