= Listed buildings in Hingham, Norfolk =

Non-Civil Parish in Norfolk, England

Hingham is a town and civil parish in the South Norfolk district of Norfolk, England. It contains 97 listed buildings that are recorded in the National Heritage List for England. Of these one is grade I, six are grade II* and 90 are grade II.

This list is based on the information retrieved online from Historic England.

== Key ==
Grade	Criteria
I	Buildings that are of exceptional interest
II*	Particularly important buildings of more than special interest
II	Buildings that are of special interest

== Listing ==
Name	Grade	Location	Type	Completed (Note: The date given is the date used by Historic England as significant for the initial building or that of an important part in the structure's description.)	Date designated	Grid ref. (Note: The grid reference is based on the British national grid reference system, sometimes known as OSGB36, used by the Ordnance Survey.) Geo-coordinates	Notes	Entry number (Note: The "List Entry Number" is a unique number assigned to each listed building and scheduled monument by Historic England.)	Image	Wikidata
Cadge's Farmhouse	II	Attleborough Road			22 March 1991	TG0175800496; 52°33′54″N 0°58′31″E		1051164	Upload Photo	Q26303082
Church of St. Andrew	I	Attleborough Road	church building		26 November 1959	TG0218002125; 52°34′46″N 0°58′57″E		1051162	Church of St. Andrew More images	Q17537547
Garden Wall and Gates to Former Rectory	II	Attleborough Road			27 January 1977	TG0210102087; 52°34′44″N 0°58′53″E		1170699	Upload Photo	Q26464332
Garden Wall to North and North East of St Andrew's Lodge	II	Attleborough Road			27 January 1977	TG0212602201; 52°34′48″N 0°58′55″E		1170771	Upload Photo	Q26464435
Gurney's Manor	II	Attleborough Road			2 October 1951	TG0175201256; 52°34′18″N 0°58′33″E		1170752	Upload Photo	Q26464407
Hingham War Memorial	II	Attleborough Road, Nr9			30 October 2017	TG0212402118; 52°34′45″N 0°58′54″E		1450611	Upload Photo	Q66479082
Manor House	II	Attleborough Road			2 October 1951	TG0212202087; 52°34′44″N 0°58′54″E		1051163	Upload Photo	Q26303081
St Andrew's Lodge	II	Attleborough Road			26 November 1959	TG0212802155; 52°34′47″N 0°58′55″E		1050448	Upload Photo	Q26302432
18, Baxter Road	II	18, Baxter Road			27 January 1977	TG0220902371; 52°34′54″N 0°58′59″E		1051166	Upload Photo	Q26303084
25 and 27, Baxter Road	II	25 and 27, Baxter Road			27 January 1977	TG0219602356; 52°34′53″N 0°58′59″E		1051165	Upload Photo	Q26303083
1, Bond Street	II	1, Bond Street			27 January 1977	TG0225002204; 52°34′48″N 0°59′01″E		1372827	Upload Photo	Q26653879
2a, 2 and 4, Bond Street	II	2a, 2 and 4, Bond Street			27 January 1977	TG0224202191; 52°34′48″N 0°59′01″E		1051169	Upload Photo	Q26303087
3 and 5, Bond Street	II	3 and 5, Bond Street			27 January 1977	TG0224602217; 52°34′48″N 0°59′01″E		1051167	Upload Photo	Q26303085
6, Bond Street	II	6, Bond Street			27 January 1977	TG0223302207; 52°34′48″N 0°59′00″E		1372829	Upload Photo	Q26653881
8, Bond Street	II	8, Bond Street			27 January 1977	TG0223002214; 52°34′48″N 0°59′00″E		1171115	Upload Photo	Q26464921
Walnut Tree House	II	10, Bond Street			27 January 1977	TG0220102225; 52°34′49″N 0°58′59″E		1051170	Upload Photo	Q26303088
The Mansion House	II*	12 and 14, Bond Street			26 November 1959	TG0221402267; 52°34′50″N 0°58′59″E		1171125	Upload Photo	Q17532488
13-21, Bond Street	II	13-21, Bond Street			2 October 1951	TG0223502275; 52°34′50″N 0°59′00″E		1372828	Upload Photo	Q26653880
Number 16 Including Boundary Wall Immediately North West Along Pottles Alley.	II	16, Bond Street			27 January 1977	TG0221102288; 52°34′51″N 0°58′59″E		1051171	Upload Photo	Q26303089
The Thatched House	II	18, Bond Street			2 October 1951	TG0221202300; 52°34′51″N 0°58′59″E		1171148	Upload Photo	Q26464975
Blair House (including Garden Wall at Rear Fronting Chapel Street - See Chapel Street).(no 7)	II	Bond Street			27 January 1977	TG0224502234; 52°34′49″N 0°59′01″E		1051168	Upload Photo	Q26303086
Outbuilding Immediately East of Number 21	II	Bond Street			27 January 1977	TG0225902296; 52°34′51″N 0°59′02″E		1170920	Upload Photo	Q26464611
1 and 3, Chapel Street	II	1 and 3, Chapel Street			27 January 1977	TG0226702332; 52°34′52″N 0°59′02″E		1372830	Upload Photo	Q26653882
2, Chapel Street (see Details for Further Address Information)	II	2, Chapel Street			27 January 1977	TG0230702340; 52°34′52″N 0°59′04″E		1171199	Upload Photo	Q26465038
4, 6 and 8, Chapel Street	II	4, 6 and 8, Chapel Street			27 January 1977	TG0231002314; 52°34′52″N 0°59′05″E		1372831	Upload Photo	Q26653883
7 and 9, Chapel Street	II	7 and 9, Chapel Street			27 January 1977	TG0227602300; 52°34′51″N 0°59′03″E		1305725	Upload Photo	Q26592566
14 and 16, Chapel Street	II	14 and 16, Chapel Street			27 January 1977	TG0231802259; 52°34′50″N 0°59′05″E		1171221	Upload Photo	Q26465063
Garden Wall at Rear of Blair House	II	Chapel Street			27 January 1977	TG0229402254; 52°34′50″N 0°59′04″E		1051172	Upload Photo	Q26303090
Tufts and Whitton	II	3, Church Street			27 January 1977	TG0221002183; 52°34′47″N 0°58′59″E		1051173	Upload Photo	Q26303091
5, Church Street	II	5, Church Street			27 January 1977	TG0219602181; 52°34′47″N 0°58′58″E		1051174	Upload Photo	Q26303092
Fairland House	II	5 and 7, Church Street			27 January 1977	TG0217802191; 52°34′48″N 0°58′57″E		1305631	Upload Photo	Q26592479
The Watermill (mill and Millhouse)	II	Deopham Road			27 January 1977	TG0328000795; 52°34′01″N 0°59′53″E		1051176	Upload Photo	Q26303094
The Limes	II	2, Dereham Road			27 January 1977	TG0209702308; 52°34′52″N 0°58′53″E		1171265	Upload Photo	Q26465121
3, Dereham Road	II	3, Dereham Road			27 January 1977	TG0213102307; 52°34′52″N 0°58′55″E		1372832	Upload Photo	Q26653884
Eagle Cottage	II	4, Dereham Road			27 January 1977	TG0209902332; 52°34′52″N 0°58′53″E		1372833	Upload Photo	Q26653885
6, Dereham Road	II	6, Dereham Road			27 January 1977	TG0210002337; 52°34′53″N 0°58′53″E		1171273	Upload Photo	Q26465142
Westview	II	31, Dereham Road			27 January 1977	TG0203602486; 52°34′57″N 0°58′50″E		1171255	Upload Photo	Q26465096
Manson Green Farmhouse	II	Dereham Road			27 January 1977	TG0194003440; 52°35′28″N 0°58′47″E		1051175	Upload Photo	Q26303093
Stables to Former Rectory	II	17, Fairland Street			27 January 1977	TG0210402148; 52°34′46″N 0°58′53″E		1050447	Upload Photo	Q26302431
1-6, Fairland Terrace	II	1-6, Fairland Terrace			27 January 1977	TG0219202263; 52°34′50″N 0°58′58″E		1171298	Upload Photo	Q26465197
43, Hall Lane	II	43, Hall Lane			27 January 1977	TG0252701845; 52°34′36″N 0°59′15″E		1372835	Upload Photo	Q26653887
3 and 5, Hall Moor Road	II	3 and 5, Hall Moor Road			27 January 1977	TG0254001810; 52°34′35″N 0°59′16″E		1051179	Upload Photo	Q26303097
Oxhey Place	II	13, Hall Moor Road			27 January 1977	TG0254401761; 52°34′33″N 0°59′16″E		1305598	Upload Photo	Q26592448
Cutbush Farmhouse	II	Hardingham Road			27 January 1977	TG0396402994; 52°35′11″N 1°00′34″E		1171407	Upload Photo	Q26465369
White Lodge	II	Hardingham Road			27 January 1977	TG0334202741; 52°35′04″N 1°00′00″E		1372836	Upload Photo	Q26653888
Former Grammar School	II	12, Hardingham Street			27 January 1977	TG0230202377; 52°34′54″N 0°59′04″E		1051180	Upload Photo	Q26303098
The New Cafe	II	1, Market Place			27 January 1977	TG0226002191; 52°34′48″N 0°59′02″E		1051181	Upload Photo	Q26303099
2, Market Place	II	2, Market Place			2 October 1951	TG0227102193; 52°34′48″N 0°59′02″E		1171438	Upload Photo	Q26465421
White Hart Hotel	II	3, Market Place	hotel		2 October 1951	TG0228702192; 52°34′48″N 0°59′03″E		1051182	White Hart Hotel More images	Q26303100
4, Market Place	II	4, Market Place			2 October 1951	TG0230802189; 52°34′48″N 0°59′04″E		1171448	Upload Photo	Q26465437
5, Market Place	II	5, Market Place			2 October 1951	TG0231602189; 52°34′47″N 0°59′05″E		1051183	Upload Photo	Q26303101
6, Market Place	II	6, Market Place			2 October 1951	TG0232702188; 52°34′47″N 0°59′05″E		1051140	Upload Photo	Q26303061
7, Market Place	II	7, Market Place			2 October 1951	TG0234002191; 52°34′48″N 0°59′06″E		1171464	Upload Photo	Q26465465
Southernwood House	II*	9, Market Place			2 October 1951	TG0236302221; 52°34′48″N 0°59′07″E		1051141	Upload Photo	Q17532216
Quorn House	II*	10, Market Place	house		26 November 1959	TG0237602196; 52°34′48″N 0°59′08″E		1171512	Quorn House More images	Q17532499
Little London	II*	11, Market Place	architectural structure		26 November 1959	TG0238002180; 52°34′47″N 0°59′08″E		1051142	Little London More images	Q17532229
Admirals House	II*	12 and 12a, Market Place			26 November 1959	TG0238602153; 52°34′46″N 0°59′08″E		1305575	Upload Photo	Q17532732
Beaconsfield House Including Railings and Gateway in Front.	II*	13, Market Place	architectural structure		26 November 1959	TG0238802142; 52°34′46″N 0°59′08″E		1051143	Beaconsfield House Including Railings and Gateway in Front. More images	Q17532245
14, Market Place	II	14, Market Place			27 January 1977	TG0238502121; 52°34′45″N 0°59′08″E		1051145	Upload Photo	Q26303063
16, Market Place	II	16, Market Place			2 October 1951	TG0235502118; 52°34′45″N 0°59′06″E		1171572	Upload Photo	Q26465640
Barclays Bank	II	17 and 18, Market Place			27 January 1977	TG0235002110; 52°34′45″N 0°59′06″E		1372857	Upload Photo	Q26653907
19, Market Place	II	19, Market Place			27 January 1977	TG0234202115; 52°34′45″N 0°59′06″E		1171593	Upload Photo	Q26465705
20, Market Place	II	20, Market Place			27 January 1977	TG0233502116; 52°34′45″N 0°59′05″E		1051146	Upload Photo	Q26303064
21, Market Place	II	21, Market Place			2 October 1951	TG0232602112; 52°34′45″N 0°59′05″E		1305529	Upload Photo	Q26592384
22, 23 and 23a, Market Place	II	22, 23 and 23a, Market Place			2 October 1951	TG0231602114; 52°34′45″N 0°59′04″E		1372858	Upload Photo	Q26653908
Church House	II	25 and 27, Market Place			27 January 1977	TG0226902124; 52°34′45″N 0°59′02″E		1171639	Upload Photo	Q26465832
28, Market Place	II	28, Market Place			27 January 1977	TG0224702144; 52°34′46″N 0°59′01″E		1051147	Upload Photo	Q26303065
Clay Cottage	II	29, Market Place			26 November 1959	TG0225902134; 52°34′46″N 0°59′01″E		1171666	Upload Photo	Q26465915
30, Market Place	II	30, Market Place			27 January 1977	TG0226002143; 52°34′46″N 0°59′02″E		1372859	Upload Photo	Q26653909
31, Market Place	II	31, Market Place			27 January 1977	TG0225902149; 52°34′46″N 0°59′01″E		1051148	Upload Photo	Q26303066
The Manse	II	32, Market Place			27 January 1977	TG0225402160; 52°34′47″N 0°59′01″E		1171675	Upload Photo	Q26465942
34, Market Place	II	34, Market Place			2 October 1951	TG0232002142; 52°34′46″N 0°59′05″E		1051149	Upload Photo	Q26303067
35, Market Place	II	35, Market Place			2 October 1951	TG0230802146; 52°34′46″N 0°59′04″E		1305490	Upload Photo	Q26592348
36 and 37, Market Place	II	36 and 37, Market Place			27 January 1977	TG0229802147; 52°34′46″N 0°59′04″E		1372860	Upload Photo	Q26653910
Post Office	II	39 and 40, Market Place			27 January 1977	TG0227202159; 52°34′47″N 0°59′02″E		1305461	Upload Photo	Q26592321
Garden Wall to South of Beaconsfield House Along Norwich Street	II	Market Place			27 January 1977	TG0244902099; 52°34′44″N 0°59′11″E		1051144	Upload Photo	Q26303062
K6 Telephone Kiosk	II	Market Place			27 October 1989	TG0232402168; 52°34′47″N 0°59′05″E		1171428	Upload Photo	Q26465408
Stable and Shed to Rear of No 10 Quorn House	II	Market Place			18 September 2001	TG0240402196; 52°34′48″N 0°59′09″E		1389431	Upload Photo	Q26668865
Stables Immediately South East of Beaconsfield House	II	Market Place			27 January 1977	TG0241802121; 52°34′45″N 0°59′10″E		1305545	Upload Photo	Q26592399
Former Windmill	II	5, Mill Corner			27 January 1977	TG0263101812; 52°34′35″N 0°59′20″E		1051150	Upload Photo	Q26303068
Chest Nut Farmhouse	II	Money Hills			27 January 1977	TG0293000011; 52°33′36″N 0°59′32″E		1305470	Upload Photo	Q26592328
Alexander's Farmhouse Alexandra Farmhouse	II	Norwich Road			27 January 1977	TG0355802349; 52°34′51″N 1°00′11″E		1372861	Upload Photo	Q26653911
1, 3 and 5, Norwich Street	II	1, 3 and 5, Norwich Street			27 January 1977	TG0239702116; 52°34′45″N 0°59′09″E		1171736	Upload Photo	Q26466100
3, Pottles Alley	II	3, Pottles Alley			27 January 1977	TG0216302285; 52°34′51″N 0°58′57″E		1051151	Upload Photo	Q26303069
Blenheim Cottage	II	28, Seamere Road			27 January 1977	TG0297201742; 52°34′32″N 0°59′38″E		1171755	Upload Photo	Q26466158
Pearce's Farmhouse	II	Seamere Road			27 January 1977	TG0406401617; 52°34′27″N 1°00′36″E		1372863	Upload Photo	Q26653914
Seameere Farmhouse	II	Seamere Road			27 January 1977	TG0386001410; 52°34′20″N 1°00′25″E		1305433	Upload Photo	Q26592297
Lilac Farmhouse	II	42, Seamrere Road			27 January 1977	TG0314901766; 52°34′33″N 0°59′48″E		1051153	Upload Photo	Q26303071
College Farmhouse	II	South Burgh Lane			27 January 1977	TG0095002739; 52°35′07″N 0°57′53″E		1171740	Upload Photo	Q26466110
Frost Row Farmhouse	II	South Burgh Lane			27 January 1977	TG0037701346; 52°34′23″N 0°57′20″E		1051152	Upload Photo	Q26303070
1 and 2, the Fairland	II	1 and 2, The Fairland			27 January 1977	TG0201102262; 52°34′50″N 0°58′49″E		1372834	Upload Photo	Q26653886
Anundave	II	7, The Fairland			27 January 1977	TG0210902282; 52°34′51″N 0°58′54″E		1171304	Upload Photo	Q26465206
8, the Fairland	II	8, The Fairland			27 January 1977	TG0213502287; 52°34′51″N 0°58′55″E		1051177	Upload Photo	Q26303095
The Unicorn	II	12, The Fairland			27 January 1977	TG0215902262; 52°34′50″N 0°58′56″E		1171317	Upload Photo	Q26465227
13 and 14, the Fairland	II	13 and 14, The Fairland			27 January 1977	TG0216302246; 52°34′50″N 0°58′57″E		1051178	Upload Photo	Q26303096
Watton Road Farmhouse	II	Watton Road			27 January 1977	TG0072802138; 52°34′48″N 0°57′40″E		1372862	Upload Photo	Q26653912
The Willows	II	Woodrising Lane			2 October 1951	TG0088002532; 52°35′00″N 0°57′49″E		1171780	Upload Photo	Q26466231

== See also ==
- Grade I listed buildings in Norfolk
- Grade II* listed buildings in Norfolk

== Sources ==
- Wilson, Bill; Pevsner, Nikolaus (1999) [1962], Norfolk 2: North-West and South, The Buildings of England, New Haven and London: Yale University Press, ISBN 978-0-300-09657-6
