= Listed buildings in Carleton Rode =

Non-Civil Parish in Norfolk, England

Carleton Rode is a village and civil parish in the South Norfolk district of Norfolk, England. It contains 54 listed buildings that are recorded in the National Heritage List for England. Of these one is grade I and 53 are grade II.

This list is based on the information retrieved online from Historic England.

== Key ==
Grade	Criteria
I	Buildings that are of exceptional interest
II*	Particularly important buildings of more than special interest
II	Buildings that are of special interest

== Listing ==
Name	Grade	Location	Type	Completed (Note: The date given is the date used by Historic England as significant for the initial building or that of an important part in the structure's description.)	Date designated	Grid ref. (Note: The grid reference is based on the British national grid reference system, sometimes known as OSGB36, used by the Ordnance Survey.) Geo-coordinates	Notes	Entry number (Note: The "List Entry Number" is a unique number assigned to each listed building and scheduled monument by Historic England.)	Image	Wikidata
Ash Farmhouse	II	Ash Lane			26 June 1981	TM1166491105; 52°28′37″N 1°06′55″E		1171460	Upload Photo	Q26465460
Fen Farmhouse	II	Ash Lane			26 June 1981	TM1180491133; 52°28′37″N 1°07′03″E		1373595	Upload Photo	Q26654563
South View and Adjoining Dwelling Occupied by Mr Newman	II	Ash Lane			26 June 1981	TM1142491056; 52°28′35″N 1°06′42″E		1049587	Upload Photo	Q26301613
The Ashes	II	Ash Lane			26 June 1981	TM1116191182; 52°28′40″N 1°06′29″E		1373594	Upload Photo	Q26654562
Whitehouse Farmhouse	II	Ash Lane			26 June 1981	TM1136291014; 52°28′34″N 1°06′39″E		1305585	Upload Photo	Q26592435
Oaks Farmhouse	II	Attleborough Road			26 June 1981	TM0953494958; 52°30′44″N 1°05′11″E		1171474	Upload Photo	Q26465478
Cottage Immediately South of Day's Garage Occupied by Mr Day	II	Bunwell Street			26 June 1981	TM1117693978; 52°30′10″N 1°06′36″E		1171479	Upload Photo	Q26465487
House Occupied by R B Housago Immediately West of Day's Garage	II	Bunwell Street			26 June 1981	TM1114694004; 52°30′11″N 1°06′34″E		1049589	Upload Photo	Q26301616
Meadowley	II	Bunwell Street			26 June 1981	TM1104394024; 52°30′12″N 1°06′29″E		1049588	Upload Photo	Q26301615
Northcote	II	Bunwell Street			26 June 1981	TM1124593968; 52°30′10″N 1°06′39″E		1252529	Upload Photo	Q26544383
Baptist Chapel	II	Chapel Road			11 September 1951	TM1179893015; 52°29′38″N 1°07′07″E		1373596	Upload Photo	Q26654564
Carleton Rode War Memorial	II	Church Road, NR16 1RN	war memorial		23 February 2017	TM1158592387; 52°29′18″N 1°06′54″E		1442401	Carleton Rode War Memorial More images	Q66478467
Church Farmhouse	II	Church Road			26 June 1981	TM1140892537; 52°29′23″N 1°06′45″E		1049590	Upload Photo	Q26301617
Church of All Saints	I	Church Road	church building		7 December 1959	TM1148692512; 52°29′22″N 1°06′49″E		1305560	Church of All Saints More images	Q17537659
Churchyard Wall to South and West of Church	II	Church Road			26 June 1981	TM1145292492; 52°29′22″N 1°06′47″E		1373597	Upload Photo	Q26654565
Emma's Lodge	II	Church Road			26 June 1981	TM1180091594; 52°28′52″N 1°07′03″E		1171514	Upload Photo	Q26465524
Rectory Cottages	II	Church Road			26 June 1981	TM1161592397; 52°29′18″N 1°06′55″E		1049591	Upload Photo	Q26301618
The Old Rectory	II	Church Road			11 September 1951	TM1157092575; 52°29′24″N 1°06′53″E		1305571	Upload Photo	Q26592423
Kilmurray	II	Fen Road			26 June 1981	TM1212491018; 52°28′33″N 1°07′19″E		1049592	Upload Photo	Q26301619
White Lodge	II	Fen Road			26 June 1981	TM1194191255; 52°28′41″N 1°07′10″E		1171517	Upload Photo	Q26465526
Briar Cottage	II	Flaxlands			26 June 1981	TM1063493172; 52°29′45″N 1°06′05″E		1049593	Upload Photo	Q26301620
Greenways Farmhouse	II	Flaxlands			26 June 1981	TM1082193080; 52°29′42″N 1°06′15″E		1373599	Upload Photo	Q26654567
Rose Cottage	II	Flaxlands			26 June 1981	TM1062393198; 52°29′46″N 1°06′05″E		1373598	Upload Photo	Q26654566
The Cottage	II	Flaxlands			26 June 1981	TM1083093146; 52°29′44″N 1°06′16″E		1171526	Upload Photo	Q26465536
The Manor	II	Flaxlands Road			12 April 1978	TM1135292625; 52°29′26″N 1°06′42″E		1049595	Upload Photo	Q26301622
Primrose Farm	II	Hall Road, Norwich, NR16 1RG			26 June 1981	TM1058193267; 52°29′48″N 1°06′03″E		1171548	Upload Photo	Q26465578
Highfield	II	Mill Road			26 June 1981	TM1007793242; 52°29′48″N 1°05′36″E		1305541	Upload Photo	Q26592394
The Mill House	II	Mill Road			26 June 1981	TM0985093252; 52°29′48″N 1°05′24″E		1171560	Upload Photo	Q26465605
The Steam Mill	II	Mill Road			26 June 1981	TM0985493322; 52°29′51″N 1°05′24″E		1373600	Upload Photo	Q26654568
Grove Farmhouse	II	North Road			26 June 1981	TM1124393557; 52°29′56″N 1°06′38″E		1049594	Upload Photo	Q26301621
Black Hall Farmhouse	II	Old Hall Road			26 June 1981	TM1064493346; 52°29′50″N 1°06′06″E		1049596	Upload Photo	Q26301624
Old Hall Farmhouse	II	Old Hall Road			26 June 1981	TM1068293659; 52°30′00″N 1°06′09″E		1305554	Upload Photo	Q26592408
Barn Immediately South of Poplar Farmhouse	II	Rode Lane			26 June 1981	TM1095191327; 52°28′45″N 1°06′18″E		1305522	Upload Photo	Q26592378
Corner Farmhouse	II	Rode Lane			26 June 1981	TM1050793135; 52°29′44″N 1°05′58″E		1049602	Upload Photo	Q26301630
Elms Farmhouse	II	Rode Lane			26 June 1981	TM1083591509; 52°28′51″N 1°06′12″E		1049599	Upload Photo	Q26301627
Flaxlands Farmhouse	II	Rode Lane			26 June 1981	TM1041492902; 52°29′36″N 1°05′53″E		1172509	Upload Photo	Q26467256
Fox Farmhouse	II	Rode Lane			26 June 1981	TM1044093005; 52°29′40″N 1°05′55″E		1049601	Upload Photo	Q26301629
Kendall Lodge	II	Rode Lane			26 June 1981	TM1047492648; 52°29′28″N 1°05′56″E		1171605	Upload Photo	Q26465740
Laurels Farmhouse	II	Rode Lane			26 June 1981	TM1088191396; 52°28′47″N 1°06′14″E		1171603	Upload Photo	Q26465734
Plough Inn	II	Rode Lane			26 June 1981	TM1041092845; 52°29′34″N 1°05′53″E		1049600	Upload Photo	Q26301628
Poplar Farmhouse	II	Rode Lane			26 June 1981	TM1095391347; 52°28′45″N 1°06′18″E		1049597	Upload Photo	Q26301625
Yewtree Farmhouse	II	Rode Lane			26 June 1981	TM1093691369; 52°28′46″N 1°06′17″E		1049598	Upload Photo	Q26301626
Laurel Cottage	II	1 and 2, The Turnpike			26 June 1981	TM1053091041; 52°28′36″N 1°05′55″E		1373621	Upload Photo	Q26654585
Cottages Occupied by Mrs Blackburn and Mrs Greenwood Immediately East of Turnpike Cottage	II	The Turnpike			26 June 1981	TM1059791074; 52°28′37″N 1°05′59″E		1049561	Upload Photo	Q26301586
Lent Farmhouse	II	The Turnpike			26 June 1981	TM1030290953; 52°28′33″N 1°05′43″E		1373619	Upload Photo	Q26654583
Turnpike Cottage	II	The Turnpike			26 June 1981	TM1058091070; 52°28′37″N 1°05′58″E		1373620	Upload Photo	Q26654584
Turnpike Farmhouse East	II	The Turnpike			26 June 1981	TM1053391041; 52°28′36″N 1°05′55″E		1049560	Upload Photo	Q26301585
Turnpike Farmhouse West	II	The Turnpike			26 June 1981	TM1035391026; 52°28′36″N 1°05′46″E		1049559	Upload Photo	Q26301584
Farm Cottage Owned Mrs Riches	II	Upgate Street			26 June 1981	TM0958991991; 52°29′08″N 1°05′07″E		1049564	Upload Photo	Q26301590
Folly Farmhouse	II	Upgate Street			26 June 1981	TM0960892150; 52°29′13″N 1°05′09″E		1049563	Upload Photo	Q26301588
Plumtree Farmhouse	II	Upgate Street			26 June 1981	TM0968691733; 52°29′00″N 1°05′12″E		1373623	Upload Photo	Q26654587
South Farmhouse	II	Upgate Street			26 June 1981	TM0969891713; 52°28′59″N 1°05′12″E		1172602	Upload Photo	Q26467360
Upgate Farmhouse	II	Upgate Street			26 June 1981	TM0960492243; 52°29′16″N 1°05′09″E		1049562	Upload Photo	Q26301587
Westview	II	Upgate Street			26 June 1981	TM0960392204; 52°29′15″N 1°05′08″E		1373622	Upload Photo	Q26654586

== See also ==
- Grade I listed buildings in Norfolk
- Grade II* listed buildings in Norfolk

== Sources ==
- Wilson, Bill; Pevsner, Nikolaus (1999) [1962], Norfolk 2: North-West and South, The Buildings of England, New Haven and London: Yale University Press, ISBN 978-0-300-09657-6
