= Listed buildings in Costessey =

Non-Civil Parish in Norfolk, England

Costessey is a town and civil parish in the South Norfolk district of Norfolk, England. It contains 35 listed buildings that are recorded in the National Heritage List for England. Of these one is grade I and 34 are grade II.

This list is based on the information retrieved online from Historic England.

== Key ==
Grade	Criteria
I	Buildings that are of exceptional interest
II*	Particularly important buildings of more than special interest
II	Buildings that are of special interest

== Listing ==
Name	Grade	Location	Type	Completed (Note: The date given is the date used by Historic England as significant for the initial building or that of an important part in the structure's description.)	Date designated	Grid ref. (Note: The grid reference is based on the British national grid reference system, sometimes known as OSGB36, used by the Ordnance Survey.) Geo-coordinates	Notes	Entry number (Note: The "List Entry Number" is a unique number assigned to each listed building and scheduled monument by Historic England.)	Image	Wikidata
Costessey Park House	II				14 April 1983	TG1638411478; 52°39′28″N 1°11′53″E		1050760	Upload Photo	Q26302698
Costessey Park Kennels	II				14 April 1983	TG1635511499; 52°39′29″N 1°11′51″E		1373048	Upload Photo	Q26654072
Remains of Costessey Hall	II				14 April 1983	TG1632811332; 52°39′24″N 1°11′49″E		1050759	Upload Photo	Q26302697
Model Farmhouse	II	Brickfield Loke			14 April 1983	TG1558912080; 52°39′49″N 1°11′12″E		1170477	Upload Photo	Q26464015
The Round House	II	457, Dereham Road, New Costessey, NR5 0SQ			14 April 1983	TG1685510338; 52°38′51″N 1°12′15″E		1306065	Upload Photo	Q26592876
Costessey Lodge	II	Dereham Road			14 April 1983	TG1471410821; 52°39′09″N 1°10′22″E		1050761	Upload Photo	Q26302699
St Mary's, Garden Wall, Gate and Gate Piers	II	Garden Wall, Gate And Gate Piers, 93, The Street			14 April 1983	TG1757312202; 52°39′50″N 1°12′58″E		1050763	Upload Photo	Q26302701
Beehive Lodge	II	Ringland Lane			14 April 1983	TG1475012407; 52°40′01″N 1°10′28″E		1050762	Upload Photo	Q26302700
U-shaped Range of Barn, Single-storeyed Connecting Structures, Stable Block and Byre to North of Costessey Park House	II	Single-storeyed Connecting Structures, Stable Block And Byre To North Of Costessey Park House			14 April 1983	TG1639711531; 52°39′30″N 1°11′54″E		1170456	Upload Photo	Q26463969
Thatched Cottage	II	11, The Street			14 April 1983	TG1723211742; 52°39′35″N 1°12′38″E		1373049	Upload Photo	Q26654073
Tudor Barn	II	28, The Street			14 April 1983	TG1732711826; 52°39′38″N 1°12′44″E		1050765	Upload Photo	Q26302703
Riverside House	II	63, The Street			14 April 1983	TG1740912023; 52°39′44″N 1°12′48″E		1306004	Upload Photo	Q26592819
80, the Street	II	80, The Street			14 April 1983	TG1747712037; 52°39′45″N 1°12′52″E		1305954	Upload Photo	Q26592775
88, the Street	II	88, The Street			14 April 1983	TG1751312097; 52°39′47″N 1°12′54″E		1373051	Upload Photo	Q26654075
100, the Street	II	100, The Street			14 April 1983	TG1757112162; 52°39′49″N 1°12′57″E		1170673	Upload Photo	Q26464304
104, the Street	II	104, The Street			14 April 1983	TG1759212192; 52°39′50″N 1°12′59″E		1050766	Upload Photo	Q26302704
115, 117 and 119, the Street	II	115, 117 and 119, The Street			14 April 1983	TG1766612307; 52°39′53″N 1°13′03″E		1373050	Upload Photo	Q26654074
Trinity Cottage	II	120, The Street			14 April 1983	TG1768412268; 52°39′52″N 1°13′04″E		1170679	Upload Photo	Q26464309
138, 140 and 142, the Street	II	138, 140 and 142, The Street			14 April 1983	TG1776612384; 52°39′55″N 1°13′08″E		1373052	Upload Photo	Q26654076
Church Farm Barn	II	The Street			17 March 1977	TG1776512476; 52°39′58″N 1°13′08″E		1170654	Upload Photo	Q26464286
Church of St Edmund	I	The Street	church building		26 November 1959	TG1771812452; 52°39′58″N 1°13′06″E		1305980	Church of St Edmund More images	Q17537670
Costessey War Memorial	II	The Street, NR8 5DG	war memorial		23 February 2017	TG1772412441; 52°39′57″N 1°13′06″E		1442415	Costessey War Memorial More images	Q66478475
Gates and Gate Piers to No. 113	II	The Street			14 April 1983	TG1766912278; 52°39′52″N 1°13′03″E		1305976	Upload Photo	Q26592795
Tombstone (10 Yards to South of Tower of Church of St Edmund)	II	The Street			14 April 1983	TG1768812438; 52°39′57″N 1°13′04″E		1050764	Upload Photo	Q26302702
Our Lady and St Walstan Rc Church	II	Town House Road			5 March 2010	TG1729311583; 52°39′30″N 1°12′41″E		1393711	Upload Photo	Q26672857
50, West End	II	50, West End			14 April 1983	TG1682511585; 52°39′31″N 1°12′16″E		1170693	Upload Photo	Q26464325
52, 54, 56 and 58, West End	II	52, 54, 56 and 58, West End			14 April 1983	TG1681511586; 52°39′31″N 1°12′16″E		1050767	Upload Photo	Q26302705
Red Lion Cottage	II	64, West End			14 April 1983	TG1678311593; 52°39′31″N 1°12′14″E		1050768	Upload Photo	Q26302706
70, West End	II	70, West End			14 April 1983	TG1674711608; 52°39′32″N 1°12′12″E		1170702	Upload Photo	Q26464336
72 and 74, West End	II	72 and 74, West End			14 April 1983	TG1673911613; 52°39′32″N 1°12′12″E		1373053	Upload Photo	Q26654077
86, West End	II	86, West End			14 April 1983	TG1665611662; 52°39′34″N 1°12′08″E		1305940	Upload Photo	Q26592761
No. 114 and Garden Railings	II	114, West End			14 April 1983	TG1653311730; 52°39′36″N 1°12′01″E		1050769	Upload Photo	Q26302707
Fern Cottage	II	122, West End			14 April 1983	TG1650811763; 52°39′37″N 1°12′00″E		1170722	Upload Photo	Q26464360
124, West End	II	124, West End			4 April 1983	TG1650211764; 52°39′37″N 1°12′00″E		1373014	Upload Photo	Q26654044
136, West End	II	136, West End			14 April 1983	TG1644711835; 52°39′40″N 1°11′57″E		1170741	Upload Photo	Q26464391

== See also ==
- Grade I listed buildings in Norfolk
- Grade II* listed buildings in Norfolk

== Sources ==
- Wilson, Bill; Pevsner, Nikolaus (1999) [1962], Norfolk 2: North-West and South, The Buildings of England, New Haven and London: Yale University Press, ISBN 978-0-300-09657-6
