= Listed buildings in Loddon, Norfolk =

Non-Civil Parish in Norfolk, England

Loddon is a town and civil parish in the South Norfolk district of Norfolk, England. It contains 92 listed buildings that are recorded in the National Heritage List for England. Of these three are grade I, three are grade II* and 86 are grade II.

This list is based on the information retrieved online from Historic England.

== Key ==
Grade	Criteria
I	Buildings that are of exceptional interest
II*	Particularly important buildings of more than special interest
II	Buildings that are of special interest

== Listing ==
Name	Grade	Location	Type	Completed (Note: The date given is the date used by Historic England as significant for the initial building or that of an important part in the structure's description.)	Date designated	Grid ref. (Note: The grid reference is based on the British national grid reference system, sometimes known as OSGB36, used by the Ordnance Survey.) Geo-coordinates	Notes	Entry number (Note: The "List Entry Number" is a unique number assigned to each listed building and scheduled monument by Historic England.)	Image	Wikidata
Farthing Green House (council Offices)	II	1, Beccles Road			25 September 1951	TM3633598461; 52°31′58″N 1°28′59″E		1050531	Upload Photo	Q26302509
Loddon House	II*	2, Beccles Road	house		25 September 1951	TM3629898422; 52°31′57″N 1°28′57″E		1050533	Loddon House More images	Q17531773
3 and 5, Beccles Road	II	3 and 5, Beccles Road			25 September 1951	TM3635998423; 52°31′56″N 1°29′00″E		1169339	Upload Photo	Q26462533
The Chestnuts	II	4, Beccles Road			4 February 1977	TM3635398370; 52°31′55″N 1°29′00″E		1050534	Upload Photo	Q26302511
Maltby House	II	9, Beccles Road			5 September 1960	TM3638498392; 52°31′55″N 1°29′02″E		1169349	Upload Photo	Q26462543
11, Beccles Road	II	11, Beccles Road			5 September 1960	TM3639098380; 52°31′55″N 1°29′02″E		1050532	Upload Photo	Q26302510
13, Beccles Road	II	13, Beccles Road			4 February 1977	TM3640398370; 52°31′55″N 1°29′03″E		1306573	Upload Photo	Q26593339
Garden Wall to North of Number 2 (loddon House)	II	Beccles Road			25 September 1951	TM3629998443; 52°31′57″N 1°28′57″E		1306578	Upload Photo	Q26593344
The Maltings (adjoining North West of Maltby House)	II	Beccles Road			25 September 1951	TM3637098405; 52°31′56″N 1°29′01″E		1373134	Upload Photo	Q26654143
Former Town Hall	II	1 and 3, Bridge Street	city hall		4 February 1977	TM3616198779; 52°32′08″N 1°28′51″E		1169370	Former Town Hall More images	Q26462563
Bugdon House	II	5, Bridge Street			25 September 1951	TM3616398790; 52°32′09″N 1°28′51″E		1050535	Upload Photo	Q26302512
7, Bridge Street	II	7, Bridge Street			25 September 1951	TM3616098801; 52°32′09″N 1°28′51″E		1050492	Upload Photo	Q26302471
Street Farm Cottages Formerly Street Farmhouse	II	13-17, Bridge Street			25 September 1951	TM3613398848; 52°32′11″N 1°28′49″E		1050493	Upload Photo	Q26302472
King's Head Public House	II	16, Bridge Street	pub		4 February 1977	TM3615998857; 52°32′11″N 1°28′51″E		1373156	King's Head Public House More images	Q26654161
19 and 21, Bridge Street	II	19 and 21, Bridge Street			4 February 1977	TM3613998869; 52°32′11″N 1°28′50″E		1050494	Upload Photo	Q26302473
27, Bridge Street	II	27, Bridge Street			13 August 1976	TM3613398918; 52°32′13″N 1°28′50″E		1050495	Upload Photo	Q26302474
29, Bridge Street	II	29, Bridge Street			4 February 1977	TM3613298933; 52°32′13″N 1°28′50″E		1050496	Upload Photo	Q26302475
31 and 33, Bridge Street	II	31 and 33, Bridge Street			4 February 1977	TM3613198940; 52°32′14″N 1°28′50″E		1373155	Upload Photo	Q26654160
35 and 37, Bridge Street	II	35 and 37, Bridge Street			4 February 1977	TM3613098956; 52°32′14″N 1°28′50″E		1050497	Upload Photo	Q26302476
Loddon Mill and Millhouse	II	Bridge Street			4 February 1977	TM3613299013; 52°32′16″N 1°28′50″E		1050498	Upload Photo	Q26302477
Ingloss Manor House	II	Buck's Hill Lane			4 February 1977	TM3445796650; 52°31′02″N 1°27′15″E		1050499	Upload Photo	Q26302478
Numbers 1 and 3 Including Area Railings	II	1 and 3, Church Plain			13 August 1976	TM3621198686; 52°32′05″N 1°28′53″E		1169406	Upload Photo	Q26462596
5, Church Plain	II	5, Church Plain			4 February 1977	TM3620598699; 52°32′06″N 1°28′53″E		1373157	Upload Photo	Q26654162
7, Church Plain	II	7, Church Plain			4 February 1977	TM3620398707; 52°32′06″N 1°28′53″E		1169436	Upload Photo	Q26462629
9, Church Plain	II	9, Church Plain			4 February 1977	TM3620098713; 52°32′06″N 1°28′53″E		1050500	Upload Photo	Q26302479
11, Church Plain	II	11, Church Plain			4 February 1977	TM3619998722; 52°32′06″N 1°28′53″E		1169458	Upload Photo	Q26462650
13, Church Plain	II	13, Church Plain			4 February 1977	TM3619398728; 52°32′07″N 1°28′52″E		1050501	Upload Photo	Q26302480
15-21, Church Plain	II	15-21, Church Plain			4 February 1977	TM3618698739; 52°32′07″N 1°28′52″E		1306506	Upload Photo	Q26593279
Loddon Branch Library Norfolk County Council	II	31, Church Plain			4 February 1977	TM3620998775; 52°32′08″N 1°28′53″E		1169475	Upload Photo	Q26462667
33, Church Plain	II	33, Church Plain			4 February 1977	TM3623298768; 52°32′08″N 1°28′55″E		1050502	Upload Photo	Q26302481
35 and 37, Church Plain	II	35 and 37, Church Plain			4 February 1977	TM3624298768; 52°32′08″N 1°28′55″E		1169496	Upload Photo	Q26462688
Church of Holy Trinity	I	Church Plain	church building		5 September 1960	TM3634298724; 52°32′06″N 1°29′00″E		1373159	Church of Holy Trinity More images	Q17537744
Churchyard Railings West and North West of Church Wall North East and South of Church	II	Church Plain			4 February 1977	TM3625498712; 52°32′06″N 1°28′56″E		1169522	Upload Photo	Q26462715
K6 Telephone Kiosk	II	Church Plain			22 February 1988	TM3620098768; 52°32′08″N 1°28′53″E		1050503	Upload Photo	Q26302482
Loddon War Memorial	II	Church Plain, NR14 6EY	war memorial		7 June 2018	TM3625698727; 52°32′06″N 1°28′56″E		1455991	Loddon War Memorial More images	Q66479615
The Swan Inn	II	Church Plain	pub		25 September 1951	TM3617898756; 52°32′08″N 1°28′52″E		1373158	The Swan Inn More images	Q26654163
Numbers 10-12 and 13-14 Davy Place	II	10-12, Davy Place			19 November 1998	TM3631098241; 52°31′51″N 1°28′57″E		1271851	Upload Photo	Q26561751
15-20, Davy Place	II	15-20, Davy Place			19 November 1998	TM3628998249; 52°31′51″N 1°28′56″E		1271852	Upload Photo	Q26561752
Numbers 1-6 and Common Room	II	Davy Place			19 November 1998	TM3631298267; 52°31′51″N 1°28′57″E		1271850	Upload Photo	Q26561750
Methodist Church Including Railings and Gates to South East	II	George Lane			4 February 1977	TM3611098814; 52°32′09″N 1°28′48″E		1373160	Upload Photo	Q26654164
Barn Approximately 100 Yards North of Loddon Hall	II	Hales Green			4 February 1977	TM3727597211; 52°31′16″N 1°29′46″E		1169551	Upload Photo	Q26462744
Barn Approximately 75 Yards North of Lodden Hall	II	Hales Green			4 February 1977	TM3726697178; 52°31′15″N 1°29′45″E		1050504	Upload Photo	Q26302483
Barn South of Hales Hall	I	Hales Green			25 September 1951	TM3691096007; 52°30′38″N 1°29′23″E		1373161	Upload Photo	Q17537748
Barn and Stable Range Approximately 100 Yards North East of Loddon Hall	II	Hales Green			4 February 1977	TM3730997202; 52°31′16″N 1°29′48″E		1050505	Upload Photo	Q26302484
Hales Hall	I	Hales Green	house		25 September 1951	TM3694996080; 52°30′40″N 1°29′26″E		1169558	Hales Hall More images	Q5641500
Loddon Hall	II	Hales Green			4 February 1977	TM3725697119; 52°31′13″N 1°29′45″E		1169548	Upload Photo	Q26462741
Small Barn Immediately South East of Hales Hall	II*	Hales Green			4 February 1977	TM3698296055; 52°30′39″N 1°29′27″E		1050506	Upload Photo	Q17531748
Wall Immediately South East of Hales Hall	II*	Hales Green			4 February 1977	TM3696896033; 52°30′38″N 1°29′27″E		1169573	Upload Photo	Q17532426
Area Railings to West of Number 1 (the Beeches) Garden Wall to North and North West of Number 1 (the Beeches)	II	1, High Bungay Road			4 February 1977	TM3624398436; 52°31′57″N 1°28′54″E		1373162	Upload Photo	Q26654165
The Beeches	II	1, High Bungay Road			4 February 1977	TM3626298392; 52°31′56″N 1°28′55″E		1169579	Upload Photo	Q26462766
4, High Bungay Road	II	4, High Bungay Road			4 February 1977	TM3623498436; 52°31′57″N 1°28′54″E		1050507	Upload Photo	Q26302485
Numbers 5, 7 and 9 and Attached Wall to East of Number 5	II	7 and 9 And Attached Wall To East Of Number 5, High Bungay Road			19 November 1998	TM3626098237; 52°31′51″N 1°28′55″E		1271853	Upload Photo	Q26561753
Rose Cottage	II	25, High Bungay Road			4 February 1977	TM3627698140; 52°31′47″N 1°28′55″E		1169586	Upload Photo	Q26462773
1, High Street	II	1, High Street			5 September 1960	TM3623798658; 52°32′04″N 1°28′55″E		1169590	Upload Photo	Q26462776
2 and 4, High Street	II	2 and 4, High Street			4 February 1977	TM3621598671; 52°32′05″N 1°28′53″E		1050510	Upload Photo	Q26302488
3 & 5, High Street	II	3 & 5, High Street			5 September 1960	TM3624098649; 52°32′04″N 1°28′55″E		1050508	Upload Photo	Q26302486
6 and 8, High Street	II	6 and 8, High Street			4 February 1977	TM3622398652; 52°32′04″N 1°28′54″E		1306443	Upload Photo	Q26593224
9-13, High Street	II	9-13, High Street			4 February 1977	TM3625398582; 52°32′02″N 1°28′55″E		1169609	Upload Photo	Q26462793
12-16, High Street	II	12-16, High Street			4 February 1977	TM3622798626; 52°32′03″N 1°28′54″E		1169668	Upload Photo	Q26462847
The Angel Public House	II	15, High Street	pub		4 February 1977	TM3625398542; 52°32′00″N 1°28′55″E		1373163	The Angel Public House More images	Q26654166
17, High Street	II	17, High Street			4 February 1977	TM3625598528; 52°32′00″N 1°28′55″E		1169628	Upload Photo	Q26462808
Penrose	II	18, High Street			4 February 1977	TM3622498602; 52°32′02″N 1°28′54″E		1050512	Upload Photo	Q26302490
19 and 21, High Street	II	19 and 21, High Street			4 February 1977	TM3625498521; 52°32′00″N 1°28′55″E		1373164	Upload Photo	Q26654167
22 and 24, High Street	II	22 and 24, High Street			4 February 1977	TM3623398576; 52°32′02″N 1°28′54″E		1306415	Upload Photo	Q26593198
23, High Street	II	23, High Street			4 February 1977	TM3625598511; 52°31′59″N 1°28′55″E		1306437	Upload Photo	Q26593219
26-32, High Street	II	26-32, High Street			4 February 1977	TM3623398558; 52°32′01″N 1°28′54″E		1050513	Upload Photo	Q26302491
34-38, High Street	II	34-38, High Street			4 February 1977	TM3623598539; 52°32′00″N 1°28′54″E		1373184	Upload Photo	Q26654185
40, High Street	II	40, High Street			4 February 1977	TM3623598531; 52°32′00″N 1°28′54″E		1050471	Upload Photo	Q26302453
42, High Street	II	42, High Street			4 February 1977	TM3623698524; 52°32′00″N 1°28′54″E		1050472	Upload Photo	Q26302455
44, High Street	II	44, High Street			4 February 1977	TM3623698514; 52°32′00″N 1°28′54″E		1050473	Upload Photo	Q26302456
46, High Street	II	46, High Street			4 February 1977	TM3623798507; 52°31′59″N 1°28′54″E		1169730	Upload Photo	Q26462905
48, High Street	II	48, High Street			4 February 1977	TM3623698497; 52°31′59″N 1°28′54″E		1050474	Upload Photo	Q26302457
Brown and Sons Limited and Moreton House	II	52-56, High Street			4 February 1977	TM3623798464; 52°31′58″N 1°28′54″E		1306404	Upload Photo	Q26593189
Rear (west) Building of Loddon Primary School	II	High Street			4 February 1977	TM3619598634; 52°32′04″N 1°28′52″E		1050511	Upload Photo	Q26302489
Stables East of Number 15 (the Angel Public House)	II	High Street			4 February 1977	TM3627298544; 52°32′01″N 1°28′56″E		1050509	Upload Photo	Q26302487
Davy Terrace, 3-13 Low Bungay Road	II	3-13, Low Bungay Road			19 November 1998	TM3637598268; 52°31′51″N 1°29′01″E		1271854	Upload Photo	Q26561754
Numbers 6, 8 and 10 and Wall Attached to West of Number 6	II	8 and 10 And Wall Attached To West Of Number 6, Low Bungay Road			19 November 1998	TM3634098242; 52°31′51″N 1°28′59″E		1271855	Upload Photo	Q26561755
2 and 4, Lower Bungay Road	II	2 and 4, Lower Bungay Road			4 February 1977	TM3635298276; 52°31′52″N 1°29′00″E		1373185	Upload Photo	Q26654186
3 and 5, Market Place	II	3 and 5, Market Place			4 February 1977	TM3626998773; 52°32′08″N 1°28′56″E		1050475	Upload Photo	Q26302458
Walcote	II	16, Market Place			4 February 1977	TM3620798807; 52°32′09″N 1°28′53″E		1169750	Upload Photo	Q26462924
33 Mill Road	II	33, Mill Road, NR14 6DR			4 February 1977	TM3662598753; 52°32′07″N 1°29′15″E		1373186	Upload Photo	Q26654187
5, Norton Road	II	5, Norton Road			4 February 1977	TM3662198414; 52°31′56″N 1°29′14″E		1169757	Upload Photo	Q26462931
Barn Immediately West of Hall Green Farmhouse	II	Norton Road			4 February 1977	TM3710598675; 52°32′03″N 1°29′41″E		1169761	Upload Photo	Q26462935
Beech Grove Farmhouse	II	Norton Road			4 February 1977	TM3747298825; 52°32′08″N 1°30′00″E		1050477	Upload Photo	Q26302460
Hall Green Farmhouse	II	Norton Road			4 February 1977	TM3712698675; 52°32′03″N 1°29′42″E		1050476	Upload Photo	Q26302459
Barn Immediately South East of the Elms	II	Stubbs Green			25 September 1951	TM3567097269; 52°31′20″N 1°28′21″E		1373188	Upload Photo	Q26654189
Barn North East of Cannells Farmhouse	II	Stubbs Green			4 February 1977	TM3583197649; 52°31′32″N 1°28′30″E		1169824	Upload Photo	Q26463001
Cannells Farmhouse	II	Stubbs Green			4 February 1977	TM3580497624; 52°31′32″N 1°28′29″E		1373187	Upload Photo	Q26654188
Former Bush Farm House at Bush Farm	II	Stubbs Green			4 February 1977	TM3523096665; 52°31′01″N 1°27′56″E		1050479	Upload Photo	Q26302462
Stubbs House Cottages	II	Stubbs Green			4 February 1977	TM3599797643; 52°31′32″N 1°28′39″E		1169796	Upload Photo	Q26462974
The Elms	II	Stubbs Green			25 September 1951	TM3565597293; 52°31′21″N 1°28′20″E		1169831	Upload Photo	Q26463008
The Lodge	II	Stubbs Green			25 September 1951	TM3569997778; 52°31′37″N 1°28′24″E		1050478	Upload Photo	Q26302461

== See also ==
- Grade I listed buildings in Norfolk
- Grade II* listed buildings in Norfolk

== Sources ==
- Wilson, Bill; Pevsner, Nikolaus (1999) [1962], Norfolk 2: North-West and South, The Buildings of England, New Haven and London: Yale University Press, ISBN 978-0-300-09657-6
