= Listed buildings in Forncett =

Non-Civil Parish in Norfolk, England

Forncett is a village and civil parish in the South Norfolk district of Norfolk, England. It contains 64 listed buildings that are recorded in the National Heritage List for England. Of these two are grade I, two are grade II* and 60 are grade II.

This list is based on the information retrieved online from Historic England.

== Key ==
| Grade | Criteria |
|---|---|
| I | Buildings that are of exceptional interest |
| II* | Particularly important buildings of more than special interest |
| II | Buildings that are of special interest |

== Listing ==
| Name | Grade | Location | Type | Completed (Note: The date given is the date used by Historic England as significant for the initial building or that of an important part in the structure's description.) | Date designated | Grid ref. (Note: The grid reference is based on the British national grid reference system, sometimes known as OSGB36, used by the Ordnance Survey.) Geo-coordinates | Notes | Entry number (Note: The "List Entry Number" is a unique number assigned to each listed building and scheduled monument by Historic England.) | Image | Wikidata |
|---|---|---|---|---|---|---|---|---|---|---|
| Walnut Cottages | II | 1 and 2, Aslacton Road, Forncett St Peter | | | 26 June 1981 | TM1631492532; 52°29′16″N 1°11′05″E | | 1373251 | Upload Photo | Q26654249 |
| Forncett St Peter War Memorial | II | Aslacton Road, Forncett St Peter, NR16 1LT | war memorial | | 11 July 2017 | TM1643192848; 52°29′26″N 1°11′11″E | | 1447657 | Forncett St Peter War Memorial More images | Q66478843 |
| Bayes Farmhouse | II | Bayes Lane, Hapton | | | 26 June 1981 | TM1730296305; 52°31′17″N 1°12′06″E | | 1050367 | Upload Photo | Q26302354 |
| The Chequers Public House | II | Bayes Lane, Forncett St Mary | | | 26 June 1981 | TM1705395632; 52°30′55″N 1°11′51″E | | 1373252 | Upload Photo | Q26654250 |
| 10, Bentley Road | II | 10, Bentley Road, Forncett End | | | 26 June 1981 | TM1424093909; 52°30′04″N 1°09′18″E | | 1373214 | Upload Photo | Q26654213 |
| 14, Bentley Road | II | 14, Bentley Road, Forncett End | | | 26 June 1981 | TM1423593939; 52°30′04″N 1°09′18″E | | 1050369 | Upload Photo | Q26302356 |
| 18, Bentley Road | II | 18, Bentley Road, Forncett End | | | 26 June 1981 | TM1425093948; 52°30′05″N 1°09′19″E | | 1152570 | Upload Photo | Q26445482 |
| 20-22, Bentley Road | II | 20-22, Bentley Road, Forncett St Peter, NR16 1LH | | | 26 June 1981 | TM1421493979; 52°30′06″N 1°09′17″E | | 1050370 | Upload Photo | Q26302357 |
| Poplars Farm Cottage | II | Bentley Road, Forncett End | | | 26 June 1981 | TM1421493860; 52°30′02″N 1°09′16″E | | 1050368 | Upload Photo | Q26302355 |
| The Old Beams | II | Bentley Road | | | 26 June 1981 | TM1421593912; 52°30′04″N 1°09′17″E | | 1304712 | Upload Photo | Q26591661 |
| Four Seasons | II | Cheneys Lane, Forncett St. Mary, NR16 1JT, Forncett St Mary | | | 26 June 1981 | TM1612494129; 52°30′08″N 1°10′58″E | | 1373215 | Upload Photo | Q26654214 |
| The Croft | II | Cheynes Lane, Forncett St Mary | | | 26 June 1981 | TM1634194029; 52°30′04″N 1°11′09″E | | 1152589 | Upload Photo | Q26445498 |
| Church of St Peter | I | Church Road, Forncett St Peter | church building | | 7 December 1959 | TM1649492826; 52°29′25″N 1°11′15″E | | 1152619 | Church of St Peter More images | Q17537561 |
| St Peters Rectory | II | Church Road, Forncett St Peter | | | 26 June 1981 | TM1653692843; 52°29′26″N 1°11′17″E | | 1050371 | Upload Photo | Q26302358 |
| Barn Adjoining Corner Farmhouse on South-west | II | Long Stratton Road | | | 26 June 1981 | TM1488293463; 52°29′48″N 1°09′51″E | | 1152699 | Upload Photo | Q26445602 |
| Barn East of Limetree Farmhouse | II | Long Stratton Road | | | 26 June 1981 | TM1487593607; 52°29′53″N 1°09′51″E | | 1050373 | Upload Photo | Q26302360 |
| Cart Shed and Hay Loft South-east of Limetree Farmhouse | II | Long Stratton Road, Forncett End | | | 26 June 1981 | TM1487693578; 52°29′52″N 1°09′51″E | | 1373217 | Upload Photo | Q26654216 |
| Chestnut Tree Farmhouse | II | Long Stratton Road, Forncett End | | | 26 June 1981 | TM1453493634; 52°29′54″N 1°09′33″E | | 1152667 | Upload Photo | Q26445571 |
| Chestnut View | II | Long Stratton Road, Forncett End | | | 26 June 1981 | TM1448393614; 52°29′54″N 1°09′30″E | | 1373216 | Upload Photo | Q26654215 |
| Corner Farmhouse | II | Long Stratton Road, Forncett End | | | 26 June 1981 | TM1491893478; 52°29′49″N 1°09′53″E | | 1050374 | Upload Photo | Q26302361 |
| Limetree Farm Cottages | II | Long Stratton Road, Forncett End | | | 26 June 1981 | TM1476993556; 52°29′51″N 1°09′45″E | | 1050372 | Upload Photo | Q26302359 |
| Limetree Farmhouse | II | Long Stratton Road, Forncett End | | | 26 June 1981 | TM1483993601; 52°29′53″N 1°09′49″E | | 1152683 | Upload Photo | Q26445588 |
| Stables Immediately South-east of Limetree Farmhouse | II | Long Stratton Road, Forncett End | | | 26 June 1981 | TM1485493584; 52°29′52″N 1°09′50″E | | 1152690 | Upload Photo | Q26445595 |
| The Horse Shoes | II | Long Stratton Road, Forncett End | | | 26 June 1981 | TM1440893663; 52°29′55″N 1°09′26″E | | 1152659 | Upload Photo | Q26445563 |
| Barn Immediately North-west of Yew Tree Farmhouse | II | Low Road, Forncett St Mary | | | 26 June 1981 | TM1672694624; 52°30′23″N 1°11′31″E | | 1373220 | Upload Photo | Q26654218 |
| Barn North-east of Yew Tree Farmhouse | II | Low Road, Forncett St Mary | | | 26 June 1981 | TM1675694643; 52°30′24″N 1°11′33″E | | 1304630 | Upload Photo | Q26591584 |
| Barn North-west of Street Farmhouse | II | Low Road, Forncett St Peter | | | 26 June 1981 | TM1645893696; 52°29′53″N 1°11′15″E | | 1152772 | Upload Photo | Q26445674 |
| Church of St Mary | I | Low Road, Forncett St Mary | church building | | 7 December 1959 | TM1662593837; 52°29′58″N 1°11′24″E | | 1304627 | Church of St Mary More images | Q17537654 |
| Corner Farmhouse | II | Low Road, Forncett St Peter | | | 26 June 1981 | TM1640393432; 52°29′45″N 1°11′11″E | | 1373221 | Upload Photo | Q26687075 |
| Cottage Approximately 75 Yds South of Springside | II | Low Road, Forncett St Mary | | | 26 June 1981 | TM1635893811; 52°29′57″N 1°11′10″E | | 1304664 | Upload Photo | Q26591616 |
| Forncett St Mary War Memorial | II | Low Road, Forncett St Mary, NR16 1JG | war memorial | | 26 February 2018 | TM1654093877; 52°29′59″N 1°11′20″E | | 1453698 | Forncett St Mary War Memorial More images | Q66479411 |
| Hannays | II | Low Road, Forncett St Mary | | | 26 June 1981 | TM1665494305; 52°30′13″N 1°11′27″E | | 1152704 | Upload Photo | Q26445607 |
| Kingsmuir and Adjacent Cottage | II | Low Road, Forncett St Mary | | | 26 June 1981 | TM1668394355; 52°30′14″N 1°11′28″E | | 1050376 | Upload Photo | Q26302363 |
| Maryvale | II | Low Road, Forncett St Mary | | | 26 June 1981 | TM1709195227; 52°30′42″N 1°11′52″E | | 1152708 | Upload Photo | Q26445609 |
| Old Hall Farmhouse | II* | Low Road, Forncett St Mary | | | 26 June 1981 | TM1664494238; 52°30′11″N 1°11′26″E | | 1373219 | Upload Photo | Q17533160 |
| Rattles | II | Low Road, Forncett St Mary | | | 26 June 1981 | TM1648393790; 52°29′56″N 1°11′16″E | | 1050375 | Upload Photo | Q26302362 |
| Riverside Farmhouse | II | Low Road, Forncett St Mary | | | 26 June 1981 | TM1670694410; 52°30′16″N 1°11′30″E | | 1050377 | Upload Photo | Q26302364 |
| Springside | II | Low Road, Forncett St Mary | | | 26 June 1981 | TM1635693880; 52°30′00″N 1°11′10″E | | 1373218 | Upload Photo | Q26654217 |
| Street Farmhouse | II | Low Road, Forncett St Peter | | | 26 June 1981 | TM1646893667; 52°29′53″N 1°11′15″E | | 1050380 | Upload Photo | Q26302367 |
| Sunny Acres | II | Low Road, Forncett St Peter | | | 26 June 1981 | TM1640593531; 52°29′48″N 1°11′12″E | | 1050379 | Upload Photo | Q26302366 |
| The Old Post Office and Labunrum Cottage | II | Low Road, Forncett St Mary | | | 26 June 1981 | TM1711495182; 52°30′41″N 1°11′53″E | | 1050378 | Upload Photo | Q26302365 |
| Yew Tree Farmhouse | II* | Low Road, Forncett St Mary | | | 26 June 1981 | TM1674094611; 52°30′23″N 1°11′32″E | | 1152706 | Upload Photo | Q17532323 |
| Alborough | II | Mill Lane, Forncett St Peter | | | 26 June 1981 | TM1616992834; 52°29′26″N 1°10′58″E | | 1050381 | Upload Photo | Q26302368 |
| Sandpit Farmhouse | II | Overwood Road, Forncett St Peter | | | 26 June 1981 | TM1552992317; 52°29′10″N 1°10′22″E | | 1152773 | Upload Photo | Q26445675 |
| Beresford | II | Station Road, Forncett St Peter | | | 26 June 1981 | TM1737093362; 52°29′41″N 1°12′02″E | | 1050382 | Upload Photo | Q26302369 |
| Somerset Farmhouse | II | Station Road, Forncett St Peter | | | 26 June 1981 | TM1686293387; 52°29′43″N 1°11′36″E | | 1152775 | Upload Photo | Q26445677 |
| Ashdell House | II | Tabernacle Lane | | | 26 March 1990 | TM1420993657; 52°29′55″N 1°09′16″E | | 1252706 | Upload Photo | Q26544542 |
| Granville Farmhouse | II | Tabernacle Lane, Forncett End | | | 26 June 1981 | TM1428593419; 52°29′48″N 1°09′19″E | | 1373243 | Upload Photo | Q26654241 |
| 1, 2 and 3 Church Cottages | II | 1, 2 and 3 Church Cottages, The Street, Forncett St Peter | | | 26 June 1981 | TM1642692921; 52°29′28″N 1°11′11″E | | 1050339 | Upload Photo | Q26302326 |
| Barn Immediately South-west of Church Farmhouse | II | The Street, Forncett St Peter | | | 26 June 1981 | TM1638893048; 52°29′33″N 1°11′10″E | | 1050342 | Upload Photo | Q26302329 |
| Barn and Stables North-east of the Homestead | II | The Street | | | 26 June 1981 | TM1642493376; 52°29′43″N 1°11′12″E | | 1050345 | Upload Photo | Q26302332 |
| Church Farmhouse | II | The Street, Forncett St Peter | | | 26 June 1981 | TM1640293071; 52°29′33″N 1°11′10″E | | 1050341 | Upload Photo | Q26302328 |
| Clavers Cottage | II | The Street, Forncett St Peter | | | 26 June 1981 | TM1640193023; 52°29′32″N 1°11′10″E | | 1050340 | Upload Photo | Q26302327 |
| House Adjoining North-west of the Stores | II | The Street, Forncett St Peter | | | 26 June 1981 | TM1640893268; 52°29′40″N 1°11′11″E | | 1050344 | Upload Photo | Q26302331 |
| Stone Cottage | II | The Street, Forncett St Peter | | | 26 June 1981 | TM1641393193; 52°29′37″N 1°11′11″E | | 1050343 | Upload Photo | Q26302330 |
| The Homestead | II | The Street, Forncett St Peter | | | 26 June 1981 | TM1639693353; 52°29′42″N 1°11′11″E | | 1373242 | Upload Photo | Q26654240 |
| Bustard's Green Farmhouse | II | Walton Road, Forncett St Peter | | | 26 June 1981 | TM1753792287; 52°29′06″N 1°12′09″E | | 1373244 | Upload Photo | Q26654242 |
| Chestnut Tree Farmhouse | II | Walton Road, Forncett St Peter | | | 26 June 1981 | TM1751092472; 52°29′12″N 1°12′08″E | | 1152818 | Upload Photo | Q26445711 |
| Hilltop Cottage | II | Walton Road, Forncett St Peter | | | 26 June 1981 | TM1733092940; 52°29′28″N 1°11′59″E | | 1152802 | Upload Photo | Q26445697 |
| Morlands | II | Walton Road, Forncett St Peter | | | 26 June 1981 | TM1741092522; 52°29′14″N 1°12′02″E | | 1050347 | Upload Photo | Q26302334 |
| Old Court Farmhouse | II | Walton Road, Forncett St Peter | | | 26 June 1981 | TM1727793131; 52°29′34″N 1°11′57″E | | 1050346 | Upload Photo | Q26302333 |
| Orchard Cottage | II | Wash Lane, Forncett St Peter | | | 26 June 1981 | TM1667592614; 52°29′18″N 1°11′24″E | | 1050348 | Upload Photo | Q26302335 |
| Hill Farmhouse | II | West Road, Forncett End | | | 26 June 1981 | TM1398993498; 52°29′51″N 1°09′04″E | | 1373245 | Upload Photo | Q26654243 |
| Maltings Farmhouse | II | West Road, Forncett End | | | 26 June 1981 | TM1411493554; 52°29′52″N 1°09′10″E | | 1152848 | Upload Photo | Q26444192 |

== See also ==
- Grade I listed buildings in Norfolk
- Grade II* listed buildings in Norfolk

== Sources ==
- Wilson, Bill; Pevsner, Nikolaus (1999) [1962], Norfolk 2: North-West and South, The Buildings of England, New Haven and London: Yale University Press, ISBN 978-0-300-09657-6
