= Listed buildings in Bressingham =

Non-Civil Parish in Norfolk, England

Bressingham is a village and civil parish in the South Norfolk district of Norfolk, England. It contains 62 listed buildings that are recorded in the National Heritage List for England. Of these two are grade I, two are grade II* and 58 are grade II.

This list is based on the information retrieved online from Historic England.

== Key ==
Grade	Criteria
I	Buildings that are of exceptional interest
II*	Particularly important buildings of more than special interest
II	Buildings that are of special interest

== Listing ==
Name	Grade	Location	Type	Completed (Note: The date given is the date used by Historic England as significant for the initial building or that of an important part in the structure's description.)	Date designated	Grid ref. (Note: The grid reference is based on the British national grid reference system, sometimes known as OSGB36, used by the Ordnance Survey.) Geo-coordinates	Notes	Entry number (Note: The "List Entry Number" is a unique number assigned to each listed building and scheduled monument by Historic England.)	Image	Wikidata
Bressingham War Memorial	II	IP22 2AP	war memorial		21 February 2017	TM0799581520; 52°23′32″N 1°03′19″E		1442118	Bressingham War Memorial More images	Q66478418
Algar House	II	Algar Lane			11 September 1951	TM0757982728; 52°24′11″N 1°03′00″E		1170414	Upload Photo	Q26463885
Lodge Farmhouse	II	Algar Lane			26 June 1981	TM0763482718; 52°24′11″N 1°03′03″E		1049685	Upload Photo	Q26301711
Pond Farmhouse	II	Bates Lane, Fersfield			26 June 1981	TM0686483570; 52°24′40″N 1°02′24″E		1306080	Upload Photo	Q26592891
Old Boyland Hall	II	Boyland Common			11 September 1951	TM0852284424; 52°25′05″N 1°03′54″E		1049686	Upload Photo	Q26301712
House Immediately to North of Ye Olde Chequers at St James Plain	II	Chequer Lane			26 June 1981	TM0763180910; 52°23′13″N 1°02′59″E		1049645	Upload Photo	Q26301670
Number 1 St James Plain (the Parish Cottages of Ye Olde Chequers)	II	Chequer Lane			26 June 1981	TM0758180851; 52°23′11″N 1°02′56″E		1049687	Upload Photo	Q26301713
Rose Cottage	II	Chequers Lane, Diss, IP22 2AF			26 June 1981	TM0762180954; 52°23′14″N 1°02′58″E		1373583	Upload Photo	Q26654553
The Cottage	II	2, Church Street			26 June 1981	TM0741480690; 52°23′06″N 1°02′47″E		1373584	Upload Photo	Q26687091
Church Farmhouse	II	Church Street			26 June 1981	TM0749180695; 52°23′06″N 1°02′51″E		1049646	Upload Photo	Q26301671
Jubilee Farmhouse	II	Common Road			26 June 1981	TM0900881798; 52°23′39″N 1°04′14″E		1049647	Upload Photo	Q26301672
White Gates	II	Common Road			26 June 1981	TM0896082508; 52°24′02″N 1°04′13″E		1373585	Upload Photo	Q26654555
Bluepump Farmhouse	II	Diss Road			26 June 1981	TM0864680723; 52°23′05″N 1°03′52″E		1050238	Upload Photo	Q26302224
Bressingham Hall	II	Diss Road			26 June 1981	TM0790680670; 52°23′04″N 1°03′13″E		1049648	Upload Photo	Q26301673
Bressingham Lodge	II	Diss Road			26 June 1981	TM0770180770; 52°23′08″N 1°03′02″E		1049649	Upload Photo	Q26301674
Church of St John the Baptist	I	Diss Road	church building		7 December 1959	TM0760480754; 52°23′08″N 1°02′57″E		1373587	Church of St John the Baptist More images	Q17524675
Old Hall Farmhouse	II	Diss Road			11 September 1951	TM0753280851; 52°23′11″N 1°02′53″E		1049651	Upload Photo	Q26301676
Stables Immediately East of Bressingham Lodge	II	Diss Road			26 June 1981	TM0772380772; 52°23′08″N 1°03′03″E		1373586	Upload Photo	Q26654556
Stables and Cart Shed Immediately South-east of Bressingham Lodge	II	Diss Road			26 June 1981	TM0772380746; 52°23′07″N 1°03′03″E		1049650	Upload Photo	Q26301675
Ye Olde Chequers	II	Diss Road	inn		26 June 1981	TM0762780829; 52°23′10″N 1°02′58″E		1170509	Ye Olde Chequers More images	Q26464066
Fen Farmhouse	II	Fen Street			26 June 1981	TM0680280697; 52°23′07″N 1°02′15″E		1373588	Upload Photo	Q26654557
Fenside	II	Fen Street			26 June 1981	TM0657280728; 52°23′08″N 1°02′03″E		1049653	Upload Photo	Q26301679
Peartrees Cottage	II	Fen Street			26 June 1981	TM0642780733; 52°23′09″N 1°01′55″E		1373589	Upload Photo	Q26654558
The Brambles	II	Fen Street			26 June 1981	TM0671080728; 52°23′08″N 1°02′10″E		1049652	Upload Photo	Q26301678
Three Gates Farmhouse	II	Fen Street			26 June 1981	TM0690980590; 52°23′03″N 1°02′20″E		1170521	Upload Photo	Q26464088
Waveney Rising	II	Fen Street			26 June 1981	TM0648180742; 52°23′09″N 1°01′58″E		1170537	Upload Photo	Q26464118
Wood Pightle	II	Fen Street			26 June 1981	TM0664380724; 52°23′08″N 1°02′06″E		1306048	Upload Photo	Q26592861
High House	II	Fersfield Road			11 September 1951	TM0765581843; 52°23′43″N 1°03′02″E		1049654	Upload Photo	Q26301680
Poplar Farmhouse	II	Fersfield Road			26 June 1981	TM0773781616; 52°23′35″N 1°03′06″E		1170541	Upload Photo	Q26464121
Barn Immediately West of Willow Farmhouse	II	Hall Lane			26 June 1981	TM0723982405; 52°24′01″N 1°02′41″E		1373590	Upload Photo	Q26654559
Fenners Farmhouse	II	Hall Lane			26 June 1981	TM0743981932; 52°23′46″N 1°02′51″E		1170546	Upload Photo	Q26464126
Willow Farmhouse	II	Hall Lane			26 June 1981	TM0726482400; 52°24′01″N 1°02′43″E		1170544	Upload Photo	Q26464124
Badgers, High Road	II	High Road, IP22 2AT			26 June 1981	TM0833081464; 52°23′30″N 1°03′37″E		1170547	Upload Photo	Q26464127
Barn Approximately 30 Yards North-west of Thatchers	II	High Road			26 June 1981	TM0818381456; 52°23′29″N 1°03′29″E		1049657	Upload Photo	Q26301683
Grange Cottage	II	High Road			26 June 1981	TM0835181405; 52°23′28″N 1°03′38″E		1373553	Upload Photo	Q26654525
Grange Farmhouse	II*	High Road			11 September 1951	TM0848081400; 52°23′27″N 1°03′45″E		1373591	Upload Photo	Q17533246
Moorings	II	High Road			26 June 1981	TM0824681429; 52°23′29″N 1°03′32″E		1306006	Upload Photo	Q26592821
Thatchers	II	High Road			26 June 1981	TM0819281427; 52°23′29″N 1°03′30″E		1306020	Upload Photo	Q26592835
The Highlands	II	High Road			26 June 1981	TM0824181480; 52°23′30″N 1°03′32″E		1049655	Upload Photo	Q26301681
Village Hall	II	High Road			26 June 1981	TM0827881463; 52°23′30″N 1°03′34″E		1049656	Upload Photo	Q26301682
The Cottage	II	Kennighall Road			26 June 1981	TM0695284123; 52°24′57″N 1°02′30″E		1049658	Upload Photo	Q26301684
Deal Farmhouse	II	Ladys Lane			26 June 1981	TM0834783494; 52°24′35″N 1°03′42″E		1373554	Upload Photo	Q26654526
Norbank Cottage	II	School Road			26 June 1981	TM0773980954; 52°23′14″N 1°03′05″E		1305973	Upload Photo	Q26592793
Pine Tree Cottage	II	School Road			26 June 1981	TM0789881349; 52°23′26″N 1°03′14″E		1170621	Upload Photo	Q26464230
The Spinney	II	School Road			26 June 1981	TM0775681089; 52°23′18″N 1°03′06″E		1049659	Upload Photo	Q26301685
Hill Farmhouse	II	South Lopham Road			26 June 1981	TM0626882174; 52°23′55″N 1°01′50″E		1049660	Upload Photo	Q26301686
Poplar Farmhouse	II	Stone Lane			26 June 1981	TM0795983965; 52°24′51″N 1°03′23″E		1049661	Upload Photo	Q26301687
Stone Lane Farmhouse	II	Stone Lane			26 June 1981	TM0811383956; 52°24′50″N 1°03′31″E		1170623	Upload Photo	Q26464235
Row Farmhouse	II	The By-road, Fersfield Common			26 June 1981	TM0733884270; 52°25′02″N 1°02′51″E		1170437	Upload Photo	Q26463929
Old Common Farmhouse	II	The Common, Fersfield, IP22 2BP, Fersfield Common			26 June 1981	TM0704084438; 52°25′07″N 1°02′35″E		1170607	Upload Photo	Q26464203
Hall Cottages	II	21, 22 and 23, The Street, Fersfield			26 June 1981	TM0662082803; 52°24′15″N 1°02′10″E		1170625	Upload Photo	Q26464241
Church Farmhouse	II	The Street, Fersfield			26 June 1981	TM0690283610; 52°24′41″N 1°02′26″E		1170640	Upload Photo	Q26464269
Church of St Andrew	I	The Street, Fersfield	church building		7 December 1959	TM0656082827; 52°24′16″N 1°02′07″E		1049662	Church of St Andrew More images	Q17537424
Fersfield Rectory	II	The Street, Fersfield			11 September 1951	TM0652282891; 52°24′18″N 1°02′05″E		1049663	Upload Photo	Q26301688
Fersfield War Memorial	II	The Street, Fersfield, IP22 2BW	war memorial		14 February 2017	TM0657282868; 52°24′17″N 1°02′07″E		1442287	Fersfield War Memorial More images	Q66478446
Rose Cottage	II	The Street, Fersfield			26 June 1981	TM0671983200; 52°24′28″N 1°02′16″E		1049664	Upload Photo	Q26301689
The Magpie	II	The Street, Fersfield			26 June 1981	TM0666883113; 52°24′25″N 1°02′13″E		1170636	Upload Photo	Q26464265
Barn Approximately 60 Yards South-east of Valley Farmhouse	II	The Valley			26 June 1981	TM0731781562; 52°23′34″N 1°02′44″E		1049666	Upload Photo	Q26301690
Stables Immediately South-west of Valley Farmhouse	II	The Valley			26 June 1981	TM0726181593; 52°23′35″N 1°02′41″E		1170651	Upload Photo	Q26464280
Valley Farmhouse	II*	The Valley			11 September 1951	TM0727681601; 52°23′35″N 1°02′42″E		1049665	Upload Photo	Q17531495
House Occupied by Mr Shipley	II	Wilney Green			26 June 1981	TM0653281658; 52°23′38″N 1°02′02″E		1049624	Upload Photo	Q26301651
Wood Lane Farmhouse	II	Wood Lane, Fersfield			26 June 1981	TM0716083903; 52°24′50″N 1°02′41″E		1373572	Upload Photo	Q26654543

== See also ==
- Grade I listed buildings in Norfolk
- Grade II* listed buildings in Norfolk

== Sources ==
- Wilson, Bill; Pevsner, Nikolaus (1999) [1962], Norfolk 2: North-West and South, The Buildings of England, New Haven and London: Yale University Press, ISBN 978-0-300-09657-6
