= Listed buildings in Pulham St. Mary =

Historic structures in Norfolk, England

Pulham St. Mary is a village and civil parish in the South Norfolk district of Norfolk, England. It contains 59 listed buildings that are recorded in the National Heritage List for England. Of these two are grade I and 58 are grade II.

This list is based on the information retrieved online from Historic England.

== Key ==
Grade	Criteria
I	Buildings that are of exceptional interest
II*	Particularly important buildings of more than special interest
II	Buildings that are of special interest

== Listing ==
Name	Grade	Location	Type	Completed (Note: The date given is the date used by Historic England as significant for the initial building or that of an important part in the structure's description.)	Date designated	Grid ref. (Note: The grid reference is based on the British national grid reference system, sometimes known as OSGB36, used by the Ordnance Survey.) Geo-coordinates	Notes	Entry number (Note: The "List Entry Number" is a unique number assigned to each listed building and scheduled monument by Historic England.)	Image	Wikidata
Ashmere	II	Bush Green Lane, Pulham St. Mary			26 June 1981	TM2154587770; 52°26′35″N 1°15′30″E		1050205	Upload Photo	Q26302191
The Moat House	II	Bush Green Lane, Pulham St. Mary			26 June 1981	TM2142087704; 52°26′33″N 1°15′23″E		1155197	Upload Photo	Q26448537
Crossingford Lodge	II	Doctor's Lane, Pulham St. Mary			26 June 1981	TM2154184251; 52°24′41″N 1°15′21″E		1050206	Upload Photo	Q26302192
Barn Immediately South-west of Crossingford Farmhouse	II	Garlic Street, Pulham St. Mary			26 June 1981	TM2146083836; 52°24′28″N 1°15′16″E		1050207	Upload Photo	Q26302193
Barn South-west of Garlic Farmhouse	II	Garlic Street, Pulham St. Mary			26 June 1981	TM2169083769; 52°24′25″N 1°15′28″E		1050208	Upload Photo	Q26302194
Boundary Farmhouse	II	Garlic Street, Pulham St. Mary			26 June 1981	TM2200783760; 52°24′24″N 1°15′45″E		1050167	Upload Photo	Q26302153
Crossingford Farmhouse	II	Garlic Street, Pulham St. Mary			26 June 1981	TM2148183845; 52°24′28″N 1°15′17″E		1303443	Upload Photo	Q26590518
Gable End	II	Garlic Street, Pulham St. Mary			26 June 1981	TM2193283744; 52°24′24″N 1°15′41″E		1050166	Upload Photo	Q26302152
Garlic Farmhouse	II	Garlic Street, Pulham St. Mary			26 June 1981	TM2171483802; 52°24′26″N 1°15′29″E		1155216	Upload Photo	Q26448561
Oakdean	II	Garlic Street, Pulham St. Mary			26 June 1981	TM2187683735; 52°24′24″N 1°15′38″E		1050209	Upload Photo	Q26302195
Old Hall	II	Hall Road, Pulham St. Mary			26 June 1981	TM2176685152; 52°25′10″N 1°15′35″E		1050168	Upload Photo	Q26302154
Church Farmhouse	II	Kemp's Road, Pulham St. Mary			26 June 1981	TM2129885986; 52°25′37″N 1°15′13″E		1373316	Upload Photo	Q26654311
Ashtree Farmhouse	II	North Green, Pulham St. Mary			26 June 1981	TM2175988323; 52°26′52″N 1°15′43″E		1050171	Upload Photo	Q26302157
Barn Immediately North-east of Cranes Farmhouse	II	North Green, Pulham St. Mary			26 June 1981	TM2263288659; 52°27′02″N 1°16′30″E		1050170	Upload Photo	Q26302156
Brook Farmhouse	II	North Green, Pulham St. Mary			26 June 1981	TM2263288428; 52°26′54″N 1°16′29″E		1155230	Upload Photo	Q26448581
Cranes Farmhouse	II	North Green, Pulham St. Mary			26 June 1981	TM2261788644; 52°27′01″N 1°16′29″E		1373317	Upload Photo	Q26654312
North Green Farmhouse	II	North Green, Pulham St. Mary			26 June 1981	TM2228488268; 52°26′50″N 1°16′10″E		1373318	Upload Photo	Q26654313
Oak House	II	North Green, Pulham St. Mary			26 June 1981	TM2269788544; 52°26′58″N 1°16′33″E		1373319	Upload Photo	Q26654314
Oakleigh Grange	II	North Green, Pulham St. Mary			26 June 1981	TM2276988435; 52°26′54″N 1°16′36″E		1303454	Upload Photo	Q26590527
Park Farmhouse	II	North Green, Pulham St. Mary			26 June 1981	TM2227288366; 52°26′53″N 1°16′10″E		1050172	Upload Photo	Q26302158
The Cottage	II	North Green, Pulham St. Mary			26 June 1981	TM2256488623; 52°27′01″N 1°16′26″E		1050169	Upload Photo	Q26302155
Austin's Farmhouse	II	North Green Road, Pulham St. Mary			26 June 1981	TM2169586955; 52°26′08″N 1°15′36″E		1050175	Upload Photo	Q26302161
Leist House	II	North Green Road, Pulham St. Mary			26 June 1981	TM2104086259; 52°25′47″N 1°15′00″E		1303415	Upload Photo	Q26590491
Lift the Latch and Adjoining Cottage to South	II	North Green Road, Pulham St. Mary			26 June 1981	TM2105385392; 52°25′19″N 1°14′58″E		1155299	Upload Photo	Q26448664
Lynford, Byways and Webbs Cottage	II	North Green Road, Pulham St. Mary			26 June 1981	TM2104985476; 52°25′21″N 1°14′58″E		1050174	Upload Photo	Q26302160
North Farmhouse	II	North Green Road, Pulham St. Mary			26 June 1981	TM2132886701; 52°26′00″N 1°15′16″E		1155339	Upload Photo	Q26448716
Roseville	II	North Green Road, Pulham St. Mary			26 June 1981	TM2107185333; 52°25′17″N 1°14′59″E		1050173	Upload Photo	Q26302159
Samson's Cottage	II	North Green Road, Pulham St. Mary			26 June 1981	TM2107185350; 52°25′17″N 1°14′59″E		1373320	Upload Photo	Q26654315
Summerhouse South-west of the Grange	II	North Green Road, Pulham St. Mary			26 June 1981	TM2096585363; 52°25′18″N 1°14′54″E		1373321	Upload Photo	Q26654316
The Grange	II	North Green Road, Pulham St. Mary			11 September 1951	TM2100985396; 52°25′19″N 1°14′56″E		1155322	Upload Photo	Q26448693
1 and 2, Norwich Road	II	1 and 2, Norwich Road, Pulham St. Mary			26 June 1981	TM2096685324; 52°25′16″N 1°14′54″E		1373322	Upload Photo	Q26654317
Pennoyers School	II	Norwich Road, Pulham St. Mary			11 September 1951	TM2099185314; 52°25′16″N 1°14′55″E		1050176	Upload Photo	Q26302162
Hill Farmhouse	II	Poppy's Lane, Pulham St. Mary			26 June 1981	TM2057185781; 52°25′32″N 1°14′34″E		1303370	Upload Photo	Q26590451
Rookery Farmhouse	II	South Green, Pulham St. Mary			26 June 1981	TM2105783551; 52°24′19″N 1°14′54″E		1050177	Upload Photo	Q26302163
Brook House	II	Station Road, Pulham St. Mary			3 April 2001	TM2067984836; 52°25′01″N 1°14′37″E		1389113	Upload Photo	Q26668555
Corner Farm Cottage	II	Station Road, Pulham St. Mary			26 June 1981	TM2057184222; 52°24′41″N 1°14′30″E		1050179	Upload Photo	Q26302165
Harrolds	II	Station Road, Pulham St. Mary			26 June 1981	TM2057284444; 52°24′49″N 1°14′31″E		1303314	Upload Photo	Q26590396
Old Maltsters Arms Cottage	II	Station Road, Pulham St. Mary			26 June 1981	TM2099385281; 52°25′15″N 1°14′55″E		1050178	Upload Photo	Q26302164
Primrose Cottage	II	Station Road, Pulham St. Mary			26 June 1981	TM2073784711; 52°24′57″N 1°14′40″E		1373323	Upload Photo	Q26654318
The Old Maltsters	II	Station Road, Pulham St. Mary			26 June 1981	TM2100185287; 52°25′15″N 1°14′55″E		1155477	Upload Photo	Q26448900
The White House	II	Station Road, Pulham St. Mary			26 June 1981	TM2070885041; 52°25′08″N 1°14′39″E		1155483	Upload Photo	Q26448907
Barn North-west of the Beeches	II	Station Road By-road, Pulham St. Mary			26 June 1981	TM2077984393; 52°24′47″N 1°14′41″E		1050180	Upload Photo	Q26302166
The Beeches	II	Station Road By-road, Pulham St. Mary			11 September 1951	TM2080084350; 52°24′45″N 1°14′42″E		1303263	Upload Photo	Q26590350
The Laurels	II	Station Road By-road, Pulham St. Mary			11 September 1951	TM2074084602; 52°24′53″N 1°14′40″E		1373324	Upload Photo	Q26654319
Home Farmhouse	II	The Back Road, Pulham St. Mary			26 June 1981	TM2028584075; 52°24′37″N 1°14′15″E		1050204	Upload Photo	Q26302190
Upper Vaunce's Farmhouse	II	The Back Road, Pulham St. Mary			26 June 1981	TM1978784468; 52°24′51″N 1°13′49″E		1303473	Upload Photo	Q26590542
The Old Rectory	II	1, 2 and 3, The Street, Pulham St. Mary			26 June 1981	TM2111285342; 52°25′17″N 1°15′01″E		1155602	Upload Photo	Q26449040
Ancient and Modern	II	The Street, Pulham St. Mary			26 June 1981	TM2129685240; 52°25′13″N 1°15′11″E		1155606	Upload Photo	Q26449048
Beverley Cottage	II	The Street, Pulham St. Mary			26 June 1981	TM2105685283; 52°25′15″N 1°14′58″E		1303267	Upload Photo	Q26590354
Church of St Mary	I	The Street, Pulham St. Mary	church building		7 December 1959	TM2123285271; 52°25′14″N 1°15′08″E		1050185	Church of St Mary More images	Q17537452
Glebe Farmhouse	II	The Street, Pulham St. Mary			26 June 1981	TM2104785289; 52°25′15″N 1°14′58″E		1373325	Upload Photo	Q26654320
Granville Cottage	II	The Street, Pulham St. Mary			26 June 1981	TM2108385275; 52°25′15″N 1°15′00″E		1050182	Upload Photo	Q26302168
High Croft	II	The Street, Pulham St. Mary			26 June 1981	TM2127385189; 52°25′12″N 1°15′09″E		1155601	Upload Photo	Q26449039
Lymehurst	II	The Street, Pulham St. Mary			26 June 1981	TM2111185267; 52°25′14″N 1°15′01″E		1050183	Upload Photo	Q26302169
Post Office	II	The Street, Pulham St. Mary			26 June 1981	TM2107285280; 52°25′15″N 1°14′59″E		1050181	Upload Photo	Q26302167
Pulham St Mary War Memorial	II	The Street, IP21 4RD, Pulham St. Mary	war memorial		19 May 2016	TM2123185233; 52°25′13″N 1°15′07″E		1435134	Pulham St Mary War Memorial More images	Q26678073
The King's Head Public House	II	The Street, Pulham St. Mary			26 June 1981	TM2103485293; 52°25′15″N 1°14′57″E		1303264	Upload Photo	Q26590351
The Maid's Head	II	The Street, Pulham St. Mary			26 June 1981	TM2131085190; 52°25′12″N 1°15′11″E		1050184	Upload Photo	Q26302170
Waveney Cottage	II	The Street, Pulham St. Mary			26 June 1981	TM2107685276; 52°25′15″N 1°14′59″E		1155588	Upload Photo	Q26449018

== See also ==
- Grade I listed buildings in Norfolk
- Grade II* listed buildings in Norfolk

== Sources ==
- Wilson, Bill; Pevsner, Nikolaus (1999) [1962], Norfolk 2: North-West and South, The Buildings of England, New Haven and London: Yale University Press, ISBN 978-0-300-09657-6
