= Grade I listed buildings in Norfolk =

Norfolk shown within England

The county of Norfolk is divided into seven districts, namely Norwich, South Norfolk, Great Yarmouth, Broadland, North Norfolk, King's Lynn and West Norfolk, and Breckland.

As there are 540 Grade I listed buildings in the county they have been split into separate lists for each district.

- Grade I listed buildings in Breckland
- Grade I listed buildings in Broadland
- Grade I listed buildings in Great Yarmouth
- Grade I listed buildings in King's Lynn and West Norfolk
- Grade I listed buildings in North Norfolk
- Grade I listed buildings in Norwich
- Grade I listed buildings in South Norfolk

== See also ==
- Category:Grade I listed buildings in Norfolk
- Grade II* listed buildings in Norfolk
