= Grade II* listed buildings in Norfolk =

Buildings in Norfolk, England of historic importance

Norfolk shown within England

The county of Norfolk is divided into seven districts. The districts of Norfolk are Norwich, South Norfolk, Great Yarmouth, Broadland, North Norfolk, King's Lynn and West Norfolk, and Breckland.

As there are 839 Grade II* listed buildings in the county they have been split into separate lists for each district.

- Grade II* listed buildings in Breckland
- Grade II* listed buildings in Broadland
- Grade II* listed buildings in Great Yarmouth
- Grade II* listed buildings in King's Lynn and West Norfolk
- Grade II* listed buildings in North Norfolk
- Grade II* listed buildings in Norwich
- Grade II* listed buildings in South Norfolk

== See also ==
- Grade I listed buildings in Norfolk
