= Grade II* listed buildings in South Norfolk =

There are over 20,000 Grade II* listed buildings in England. This page is a list of these buildings in the district of South Norfolk in Norfolk.

== South Norfolk ==
Name	Location	Type	Completed (Note: The date given is the date used by Historic England as significant for the initial building or that of an important part in the structure's description.)	Date designated	Grid ref. (Note: The grid reference is based on the British national grid reference system, sometimes known as OSGB36, used by the Ordnance Survey.) Geo-coordinates	Entry number (Note: The "List Entry Number" is a unique number assigned to each listed building and scheduled monument by Historic England.)	Image
Homersfield Bridge	Alburgh, South Norfolk	Bridge	1869	3 June 1981	TM2836785740; 52°25′19″N 1°21′26″E	1031993	Homersfield Bridge More images
Church of St Mary	Ashby St Mary	Parish Church	12th century	5 September 1960	TG3292902234; 52°34′05″N 1°26′08″E	1050660	Church of St Mary More images
St Mary's Chapel	Ashwellthorpe, Ashwellthorpe and Fundenhall	House	18th century	11 September 1951	TM1636997447; 52°31′55″N 1°11′19″E	1373555	Upload Photo
Church of St Botolph	Barford	Parish Church	13th century	26 November 1959	TG1069707988; 52°37′43″N 1°06′42″E	1050737	Church of St Botolph More images
Church Farmhouse	Bawburgh	Farmhouse	Late Medieval	14 April 1983	TG1531608666; 52°37′59″N 1°10′49″E	1050779	Upload Photo
Lodge Farmhouse	Bawburgh	House	Mid 19th century	14 April 1983	TG1676708868; 52°38′03″N 1°12′07″E	1373047	Upload Photo
The Hermit's House	Bawburgh	House	17th century	2 October 1951	TG1573208818; 52°38′03″N 1°11′12″E	1050783	Upload Photo
The Slipper Chapel in Garden of Brecon House	Bawburgh	Garden House	Mid 17th century	2 October 1951	TG1574408782; 52°38′02″N 1°11′12″E	1373019	Upload Photo
Church of St Peter and St Paul	Bergh Apton	Parish Church	14th century	5 September 1960	TM3105299895; 52°32′52″N 1°24′23″E	1373078	Church of St Peter and St Paul More images
Church of St Wandregesilius	Bixley	Church	1771	26 November 1959	TG2585904964; 52°35′44″N 1°20′00″E	1050487	Church of St Wandregesilius More images
Barn and Attached Outbuildings at Church Farm	Hethel, Bracon Ash	Barn	Mid/Late 18th century	15 November 1999	TG1684900315; 52°33′27″N 1°11′51″E	1379809	Upload Photo
Cart Shed at Church Farm	Hethel, Bracon Ash	Cart Shed	18th century	15 November 1999	TG1686000344; 52°33′28″N 1°11′52″E	1379810	Upload Photo
Church Farm House	Hethel, Bracon Ash	Farmhouse	17th century	15 November 1999	TG1682600292; 52°33′26″N 1°11′50″E	1379811	Upload Photo
Mergate Hall	Bracon Ash	House	17th century	2 October 1951	TM1825799394; 52°32′55″N 1°13′04″E	1050692	Upload Photo
Church of St Peter	Bramerton	Parish Church	c. 1300	26 November 1959	TG2959704686; 52°35′29″N 1°23′18″E	1050489	Church of St Peter More images
Grange Farmhouse	Bressingham	House	16th century	11 September 1951	TM0848081400; 52°23′27″N 1°03′45″E	1373591	Upload Photo
Valley Farmhouse	Bressingham	House	16th century	11 September 1951	TM0727581595; 52°23′35″N 1°02′42″E	1049665	Upload Photo
Brockdish Hall	Brockdish	House	Early 17th century	11 September 1951	TM2117580412; 52°22′37″N 1°14′53″E	1305933	Upload Photo
The Grange	Brockdish	House	1676	19 September 1957	TM2024480020; 52°22′26″N 1°14′03″E	1049632	Upload Photo
Church of St Peter	Brooke	Parish Church	Medieval	5 September 1960	TM2939799541; 52°32′43″N 1°22′54″E	1051120	Church of St Peter More images
Porch House	Brooke	House	17th century	25 September 1951	TM2917999275; 52°32′35″N 1°22′42″E	1372848	Upload Photo
Alma House including Boundary Walls to North and South	Broome	Farmhouse	Early 18th century	25 September 1951	TM3431790840; 52°27′55″N 1°26′53″E	1152917	Upload Photo
Church of St Mary	Burgh St Peter	Parish Church	14th century	5 September 1960	TM4935193706; 52°29′03″N 1°40′16″E	1304545	Church of St Mary More images
Church of St Mary	Burston	Tower	1753	7 December 1959	TM1370383187; 52°24′18″N 1°08′25″E	1305672	Church of St Mary More images
Shimpling Place	Shimpling	House	16th century	11 September 1951	TM1516283523; 52°24′27″N 1°09′43″E	1049620	Upload Photo
Church of St Edmund	Caistor St Edmund	Parish Church	Early 14th century	26 November 1959	TG2322103380; 52°34′57″N 1°17′36″E	1373145	Church of St Edmund More images
The Old Hall	Caistor St Edmund	House	1612	2 October 1951	TG2329803807; 52°35′10″N 1°17′41″E	1050563	Upload Photo
Church of St Peter	Carleton St Peter	Parish Church	13th century	5 September 1960	TG3396702287; 52°34′05″N 1°27′03″E	1050629	Church of St Peter More images
Remains of Claxton Castle	Claxton	Fortified House	Post 1333	25 September 1951	TG3354303778; 52°34′54″N 1°26′45″E	1050630	Remains of Claxton Castle More images
Church of St. Andrew	Colney	Church	14th century	20 April 1959	TG1807407956; 52°37′32″N 1°13′14″E	1050754	Church of St. Andrew More images
Church of St Peter	Cringleford	Church	1940	26 November 1959	TG1983605824; 52°36′20″N 1°14′43″E	1306659	Church of St Peter More images
Lodge Farmhouse	Denton	Aisled House	Circa 14th century	26 June 1981	TM2890988611; 52°26′51″N 1°22′01″E	1373629	Upload Photo
Church of St Mary	Hackford, Deopham	Parish Church	12th century	26 November 1959	TG0594302258; 52°34′45″N 1°02′17″E	1172492	Church of St Mary More images
Crown Farmhouse	Deopham	Farmhouse	16th century	15 August 1983	TG0434300801; 52°34′00″N 1°00′49″E	1172516	Upload Photo
Manor House	Dickleburgh and Rushall	House	18th century	11 September 1951	TM1657681889; 52°23′32″N 1°10′54″E	1304866	Upload Photo
Dolphin House	Diss	Timber Framed House	Early 16th century	29 December 1950	TM1172979974; 52°22′37″N 1°06′33″E	1373524	Dolphin House More images
2 Mount Street	Diss	House	Early 19th century	8 June 1972	TM1169080061; 52°22′40″N 1°06′31″E	1049711	2 Mount Street
Earsham Hall	Earsham	House	17th century	11 September 1951	TM3080389821; 52°27′27″N 1°23′45″E	1050397	Earsham Hall More images
Church of St Mary	East Carleton	Parish Church	Medieval	26 November 1959	TG1798002060; 52°34′22″N 1°12′55″E	1306618	Church of St Mary More images
West Lodge	Lower Easton, Easton	Farmhouse	c. 1600	14 April 1983	TG1409411710; 52°39′39″N 1°09′52″E	1050771	Upload Photo
Church of St Michael	Flordon	Parish Church	11th century or 12th century	26 November 1959	TM1892497267; 52°31′45″N 1°13′34″E	1172235	Church of St Michael More images
Flordon Hall	Flordon	Farmhouse	1595-1612	2 October 1951	TM1867497982; 52°32′09″N 1°13′22″E	1050698	Flordon Hall More images
Old Hall Farmhouse	Forncett St Mary, Forncett	House	Late 16th century	26 June 1981	TM1664494238; 52°30′11″N 1°11′26″E	1373219	Upload Photo
Yew Tree Farmhouse	Forncett St Mary, Forncett	Timber Framed House	15th century	26 June 1981	TM1674094611; 52°30′23″N 1°11′32″E	1152706	Upload Photo
Church of St Andrew	Framingham Pigot	Parish Church	1859	7 September 1988	TG2779503600; 52°34′57″N 1°21′39″E	1050456	Church of St Andrew More images
Church of St. Michael and All Angels	Geldeston	Parish Church	12th century	5 September 1960	TM3947492284; 52°28′33″N 1°31′29″E	1153255	Church of St. Michael and All Angels More images
Gillingham Hall	Gillingham	Country House	c. 1600	25 September 1951	TM4131492276; 52°28′30″N 1°33′07″E	1050581	Gillingham Hall More images
Church of All Saints	Great Melton	Church	11th century	26 November 1959	TG1406406148; 52°36′39″N 1°09′37″E	1050731	Church of All Saints More images
Remains of Church of St Mary	Great Melton	Tower	15th century	26 November 1959	TG1404106123; 52°36′38″N 1°09′36″E	1050732	Remains of Church of St Mary More images
Church of St Michael	Great Moulton	Tower	1887	7 December 1959	TM1658490786; 52°28′19″N 1°11′15″E	1050319	Church of St Michael More images
Old Rectory	Moulton St Michael, Great Moulton	Tower	1831	15 September 1977	TM1659690724; 52°28′17″N 1°11′15″E	1050320	Upload Photo
Tomb Chest About 20 Metres South South West of Church of St Michael	Great Moulton	Chest Tomb	15th century	19 August 1993	TM1656290756; 52°28′18″N 1°11′13″E	1335082	Upload Photo
Church of St Remigius	Hethersett	Parish Church	14th century	26 November 1959	TG1608204918; 52°35′57″N 1°11′21″E	1373115	Church of St Remigius More images
Admiral's House	Hingham	House	Early 18th century	26 November 1959	TG0238602153; 52°34′46″N 0°59′08″E	1305575	Upload Photo
Beaconsfield House Including Railings and Gateway in Front.	Hingham	House	Early 18th century	26 November 1959	TG0238802142; 52°34′46″N 0°59′08″E	1051143	Beaconsfield House Including Railings and Gateway in Front. More images
Little London	Hingham	House	18th century	26 November 1959	TG0238002180; 52°34′47″N 0°59′08″E	1051142	Little London More images
Quorn House	Hingham	House	Late 18th century	26 November 1959	TG0237602196; 52°34′48″N 0°59′08″E	1171512	Quorn House More images
Southernwood House	Hingham	House	C17/18	2 October 1951	TG0236302221; 52°34′48″N 0°59′07″E	1051141	Upload Photo
The Mansion House	Hingham	House	Late 17th century	26 November 1959	TG0221402267; 52°34′50″N 0°58′59″E	1171125	Upload Photo
Holverston Hall	Holverston	House	16th century	7 September 1988	TG3072703191; 52°34′39″N 1°24′14″E	1050458	Upload Photo
Church of St Mary	Howe	Parish Church	Medieval	5 September 1960	TM2750299957; 52°33′00″N 1°21′15″E	1372850	Church of St Mary More images
Church of All Saints	Intwood, Keswick and Intwood	Parish Church	12th century	26 November 1959	TG1968704184; 52°35′28″N 1°14′31″E	1373136	Church of All Saints More images
Church of St Peter	Ketteringham	Parish Church	11th century	26 November 1959	TG1638102561; 52°34′40″N 1°11′32″E	1373140	Church of St Peter More images
Left Gateway Turret to Stable Yard at Ketteringham Hall incorporating a Greek Marble, with Attached Range	Ketteringham	Gate	1899	26 October 1987	TG1645202544; 52°34′39″N 1°11′35″E	1373142	Left Gateway Turret to Stable Yard at Ketteringham Hall incorporating a Greek Marble, with Attached Range
Right Gateway Turret to Stable Yard at Ketteringham Hall and Attached Range, incorporating Three Greek Marbles	Ketteringham	Gate	1899	26 October 1987	TG1642602564; 52°34′40″N 1°11′34″E	1170116	Right Gateway Turret to Stable Yard at Ketteringham Hall and Attached Range, incorporating Three Greek Marbles
Stanfield Hall (that part in Ketteringham Parish)	Ketteringham	House	1792	14 July 1972	TG1434001004; 52°33′53″N 1°09′40″E	1050548	Upload Photo
Church of St Mary	Carleton Forehoe, Kimberley	Parish Church	15th century	26 November 1959	TG0896205845; 52°36′37″N 1°05′05″E	1172547	Church of St Mary More images
Church of St Peter	Kimberley	Parish Church	12th century	26 November 1959	TG0715204172; 52°35′45″N 1°03′26″E	1050747	Church of St Peter More images
Church of St Andrew	Kirby Bedon	Parish Church	14th century	26 November 1959	TG2785505440; 52°35′56″N 1°21′47″E	1169464	Church of St Andrew More images
Remains of Church of St Mary	Kirby Bedon	Church ruin	13th century	26 November 1959	TG2792705414; 52°35′55″N 1°21′51″E	1050460	Remains of Church of St Mary More images
Kirby Cane Hall	Kirby Cane	Country House	17th century	25 September 1951	TM3729294105; 52°29′36″N 1°29′39″E	1050591	Kirby Cane Hall More images
Church of St Margaret	Kirstead	Parish Church	c. 1200	5 September 1960	TM2962298492; 52°32′09″N 1°23′04″E	1372852	Church of St Margaret More images
Former Stable Block to Langley Abbey	Langley Green, Langley with Hardley	Abbey	16th century	25 September 1951	TG3622002837; 52°34′19″N 1°29′04″E	1306556	Upload Photo
Hardley Hall	Langley with Hardley	Country House	Mid/Late 16th century	25 September 1951	TG3873000031; 52°32′45″N 1°31′10″E	1050632	Hardley Hall More images
Church of St Mary and All Saints	Little Melton	Parish Church	Early 14th century	26 November 1959	TG1534106912; 52°37′02″N 1°10′47″E	1050541	Church of St Mary and All Saints More images
Loddon House	Loddon	House	c. 1710	25 September 1951	TM3628998416; 52°31′56″N 1°28′57″E	1050533	Loddon House More images
Small Barn immediately South East of Hales Hall	Hales Green, Loddon	Barn	17th century	4 February 1977	TM3698296055; 52°30′39″N 1°29′27″E	1050506	Upload Photo
Wall immediately South East of Hales Hall	Hales Green, Loddon	Gate	Late 15th century	4 February 1977	TM3696896033; 52°30′38″N 1°29′27″E	1169573	Upload Photo
Premises Owned by Mr Tummore and G.J. Cracknell and Son	Long Stratton	House	17th century	7 December 1959	TM1969192636; 52°29′15″N 1°14′04″E	1050276	Upload Photo
The Old Rectory	Stratton St Michael, Long Stratton	House	16th century	7 December 1959	TM2052093581; 52°29′44″N 1°14′50″E	1373264	Upload Photo
Church of St Andrew	Colton, Marlingford and Colton	Parish Church	14th century	15 August 1983	TG1044409327; 52°38′27″N 1°06′32″E	1050751	Church of St Andrew More images
Church of St Mary	Marlingford and Colton	Parish Church	12th century	29 November 1959	TG1271608320; 52°37′51″N 1°08′30″E	1373046	Church of St Mary More images
The Old Hall	Marlingford and Colton	Farmhouse	1608	2 October 1951	TG1326309178; 52°38′18″N 1°09′02″E	1151936	Upload Photo
Church of St Botolph	Morley St Botolph, Morley	Parish Church	15th century	15 August 1983	TG0693200214; 52°33′37″N 1°03′05″E	1373064	Church of St Botolph More images
Church of St Peter	Morley	Parish Church	15th century	29 November 1959	TM0633998645; 52°32′48″N 1°02′30″E	1304931	Church of St Peter More images
Morley Manor	Morley	Manor House	Early 17th century	2 October 1951	TM0544699429; 52°33′14″N 1°01′44″E	1373065	Upload Photo
Church of St Mary Magdalen	Mulbarton	Parish Church	Medieval	26 November 1959	TG1942501147; 52°33′50″N 1°14′10″E	1172267	Church of St Mary Magdalen More images
Church of St Mary the Virgin	Newton Flotman	Parish Church	15th century	26 November 1959	TM2129898475; 52°32′21″N 1°15′43″E	1050704	Church of St Mary the Virgin More images
Dairy Farmhouse Barn	Newton Flotman	Barn	c. 1500	2 December 1983	TM2192999186; 52°32′43″N 1°16′18″E	1050707	Upload Photo
Church Farmhouse	Poringland	Farmhouse	c. 1600	26 November 1959	TG2714001644; 52°33′55″N 1°21′00″E	1306467	Upload Photo
Porch House	Poringland	Farmhouse	Late 16th century	26 November 1959	TG2717101744; 52°33′58″N 1°21′02″E	1373181	Upload Photo
Manor Farmhouse	Pulham Market	Farmhouse	Late 16th century	11 September 1951	TM2110988467; 52°26′58″N 1°15′09″E	1373298	Manor Farmhouse More images
Church of St Andrew	Raveningham	Parish Church	12th century	5 September 1960	TM3978896399; 52°30′46″N 1°31′57″E	1050483	Church of St Andrew More images
Raveningham Hall	Raveningham Park, Raveningham	Country House	Late 18th century	25 September 1951	TM3991096467; 52°30′48″N 1°32′03″E	1306263	Raveningham Hall More images
Candler's House	Harleston, Redenhall with Harleston	House	Early 18th century	7 December 1959	TM2471883605; 52°24′15″N 1°18′08″E	1156043	Upload Photo
Swan Hotel	Harleston, Redenhall with Harleston	House	17th century	11 September 1951	TM2453983416; 52°24′10″N 1°17′58″E	1050109	Swan Hotel More images
16 & 18, Old Market Place, Harleston	Harleston, Redenhall with Harleston	House	C14/15	26 November 1976	TM2461283322; 52°24′06″N 1°18′01″E	1303092	Upload Photo
Church of St Mary	Rockland St Mary	Parish Church	14th century	26 November 1959	TG3119303983; 52°35′04″N 1°24′41″E	1169589	Church of St Mary More images
Church of All Saints	Runhall	Parish Church	12th century	15 August 1983	TG0579606917; 52°37′16″N 1°02′20″E	1152154	Church of All Saints More images
Church of All Saints	Welborne, Runhall	Parish Church	12th century	15 August 1983	TG0676310176; 52°39′00″N 1°03′18″E	1304940	Church of All Saints More images
Church of All Saints	Brandon Parva, Runhall	Parish Church	15th century	15 August 1983	TG0702608077; 52°37′51″N 1°03′28″E	1373067	Church of All Saints More images
Church of St Michael	Coston, Runhall	Parish Church	13th century	15 August 1983	TG0622706210; 52°36′52″N 1°02′41″E	1373066	Church of St Michael More images
Church of St Mary the Virgin	Saxlingham Nethergate	Parish Church	11th century or 12th century	26 November 1959	TM2313797204; 52°31′37″N 1°17′17″E	1050666	Church of St Mary the Virgin More images
Old Hall	Saxlingham Nethergate	Manor House	1st half of 17th century	2 October 1951	TM2323597154; 52°31′35″N 1°17′22″E	1050665	Upload Photo
Remains of Church of St Mary	Saxlingham Nethergate	Church ruin	Before 1700	26 November 1959	TM2307696603; 52°31′18″N 1°17′12″E	1152354	Remains of Church of St Mary More images
The Old Rectory	Saxlingham Nethergate	Vicarage	1784	2 October 1951	TM2310997170; 52°31′36″N 1°17′15″E	1050667	Upload Photo
Billingford Windmill	Billingford, Scole	Windmill	Pre 1860	11 September 1951	TM1669778567; 52°21′44″N 1°10′52″E	1303800	Billingford Windmill More images
Church of St Andrew	Scole	Church	Pre Conquest	7 December 1959	TM1510279045; 52°22′02″N 1°09′29″E	1156145	Church of St Andrew More images
Church of St Andrew	Thelveton, Scole	Church	15th century	7 December 1959	TM1522881246; 52°23′13″N 1°09′41″E	1050120	Church of St Andrew More images
Thelveton Hall	Thelveton, Scole	House	c. 1592	11 September 1951	TM1555580855; 52°23′00″N 1°09′57″E	1156238	Upload Photo
Church of St Margaret	Seething	Parish Church	Medieval	5 September 1960	TM3197497947; 52°31′48″N 1°25′07″E	1305988	Church of St Margaret More images
Church of All Saints	Shotesham	Parish Church	11th century or 12th century	26 November 1959	TM2466899016; 52°32′33″N 1°18′42″E	1050644	Church of All Saints More images
Church of St Mary	Shotesham St Mary, Shotesham	Parish Church	Medieval	26 November 1959	TM2378198826; 52°32′29″N 1°17′55″E	1050642	Church of St Mary More images
Grove Farmhouse, Formerly Creasey's Grove Farmhouse	Shotesham	Farmhouse	16th century	2 October 1951	TM2527698764; 52°32′24″N 1°19′14″E	1050646	Upload Photo
The Duke's Head	Shotesham	Timber Framed House	1712	26 November 1959	TM2465099136; 52°32′37″N 1°18′42″E	1050649	Upload Photo
Church of St Mary	Sisland	Parish Church	Medieval	5 September 1960	TM3441198573; 52°32′04″N 1°27′18″E	1051106	Church of St Mary More images
Church of St Remigius	Dunston	Parish Church	13th century	26 November 1959	TG2285402239; 52°34′20″N 1°17′14″E	1050433	Church of St Remigius More images
Church of the Holy Cross	Stoke Holy Cross	Parish Church	13th century	26 November 1959	TG2358300792; 52°33′32″N 1°17′49″E	1050437	Church of the Holy Cross More images
Church of St Mary	Surlingham	Parish Church	Early 13th century	26 November 1959	TG3058406514; 52°36′27″N 1°24′15″E	1050438	Church of St Mary More images
Church of St Peter	Swainsthorpe	Parish Church	12th century	26 November 1959	TG2186300970; 52°33′41″N 1°16′18″E	1169726	Church of St Peter More images
Barn c.40m West of Gowthorpe Manor House	Gowthorpe, Swardeston	Barn	Early 17th century	2 October 1951	TG2078502345; 52°34′27″N 1°15′25″E	1366141	Upload Photo
Church of St Mary	Swardeston	Parish Church	11th century	2 October 1951	TG1990102397; 52°34′30″N 1°14′38″E	1050556	Church of St Mary More images
Gowthorpe Manor House	Gowthorpe, Swardeston	House	16th century	2 October 1951	TG2084802321; 52°34′26″N 1°15′28″E	1050515	Upload Photo
Mangreen Hall	Mangreen, Swardeston	House	17th century	2 October 1951	TG2155703044; 52°34′48″N 1°16′07″E	1366150	Mangreen Hall More images
Old Hall	Tacolneston	House	C16/17	11 September 1951	TM1495295466; 52°30′53″N 1°09′59″E	1373381	Upload Photo
Tacolneston Hall	Tacolneston	House	16th century	11 September 1951	TM1381695515; 52°30′56″N 1°08′59″E	1050036	Tacolneston Hall More images
The Manor Farmhouse	Tacolneston	House	Late 16th century	11 September 1951	TM1449095295; 52°30′48″N 1°09′34″E	1050043	Upload Photo
Tharston Hall	Tharston and Hapton	House	Late 16th century	11 September 1951	TM1914994017; 52°30′00″N 1°13′38″E	1373408	Tharston Hall More images
Thurton Lodge on North West Side of Drive to Langley Park	Thurton	Gate Lodge	c. 1785	5 September 1960	TM3437099896; 52°32′47″N 1°27′19″E	1050638	Upload Photo
Thurton Lodge, on South East Side of Drive to Langley Park	Thurton	Gate Lodge	c. 1785	5 September 1960	TM3437899890; 52°32′47″N 1°27′19″E	1306478	Upload Photo
Church of St Mary	Thwaite St Mary	Parish Church	12th century	5 September 1960	TM3336395048; 52°30′12″N 1°26′13″E	1372881	Church of St Mary More images
Channonz Hall	Tibenham	Courtyard House	Second half of 16th century	11 September 1951	TM1477088471; 52°27′07″N 1°09′33″E	1179541	Upload Photo
Remains of Church of St Mary	Tivetshall St Mary	Tower	c. 1300	7 December 1959	TM1662485810; 52°25′38″N 1°11′05″E	1372995	Remains of Church of St Mary More images
The Elms	Toft Monks	Farmhouse	Early 17th century	25 September 1951	TM4332293992; 52°29′22″N 1°34′58″E	1373124	Upload Photo
Church of St Margaret	Topcroft	Parish Church	Post Medieval	5 September 1960	TM2658592893; 52°29′13″N 1°20′09″E	1372884	Church of St Margaret More images
Whitlingham Hospital Blocks 04, 05, 06	Trowse with Newton	Country House	c. 1865	31 October 1985	TG2549906936; 52°36′48″N 1°19′46″E	1373212	Whitlingham Hospital Blocks 04, 05, 06 More images
Wacton Hall	Wacton	House	16th century	11 September 1951	TM1802990270; 52°28′01″N 1°12′30″E	1050822	Wacton Hall
Church of St James	Crownthorpe, Wicklewood	Church/House	Medieval	15 August 1983	TG0828803138; 52°35′10″N 1°04′24″E	1152239	Church of St James More images
The Old Hall	Wicklewood	Farmhouse	c. 1600	15 August 1983	TG0793202899; 52°35′03″N 1°04′04″E	1373072	Upload Photo
Wicklewood Hall	Wicklewood	Farmhouse	17th century	2 October 1951	TG0865600715; 52°33′51″N 1°04′38″E	1050726	Upload Photo
Church of All Saints	Woodton	Parish Church	12th century	5 September 1960	TM2854494621; 52°30′06″N 1°21′57″E	1170855	Church of All Saints More images
Oaks Farmhouse	Woodton	House	17th century	25 September 1960	TM2771295683; 52°30′41″N 1°21′16″E	1170906	Upload Photo
Homersfield Bridge	Wortwell	Bridge	1869	3 June 1981	TM2832985689; 52°25′17″N 1°21′24″E	1262142	Homersfield Bridge More images
Quaker Farmhouse	Wramplingham	Farmhouse	1643	29 November 1959	TG1150306512; 52°36′55″N 1°07′22″E	1050729	Upload Photo
High House Farmhouse	Wreningham	Farmhouse/House	c. 1640	20 April 1959	TM1454199392; 52°33′00″N 1°09′47″E	1373111	High House Farmhouse More images
Poplars	Wreningham	Farmhouse	1586	2 December 1983	TM1558798418; 52°32′27″N 1°10′40″E	1152496	Upload Photo
Green Dragon Public House	Wymondham	Hall House	1950	29 December 1950	TG1084201559; 52°34′15″N 1°06′35″E	1196692	Green Dragon Public House More images
Kimberley Hall including Service Wings to North West and South East	Wymondham	Country House	1712	29 December 1950	TG0904204748; 52°36′01″N 1°05′07″E	1293198	Kimberley Hall including Service Wings to North West and South East More images
Priory House, Middleton Street	Wymondham	House	c. 1670	29 December 1950	TG1083901644; 52°34′18″N 1°06′35″E	1297488	Upload Photo
Stanfield Hall (that part in Wymondham Parish)	Stanfield, Wymondham	House	1792	14 July 1972	TG1433901002; 52°33′53″N 1°09′40″E	1196723	Upload Photo
The Chestnuts	Wymondham	House	18th century	26 January 1995	TG1077001941; 52°34′28″N 1°06′32″E	1243874	Upload Photo
Thickthorn Hall	Hethersett	House	18th century	26 October 1987	TG1749205243; 52°36′05″N 1°12′37″E	1169537	Upload Photo
3 Market Street	Wymondham	House	Later	29 December 1950	TG1091901551; 52°34′15″N 1°06′40″E	1196679	Upload Photo
