= Forehoe and Henstead Rural District =

Former local government area in the UK

Coordinates: 52.57°N 1.19°E

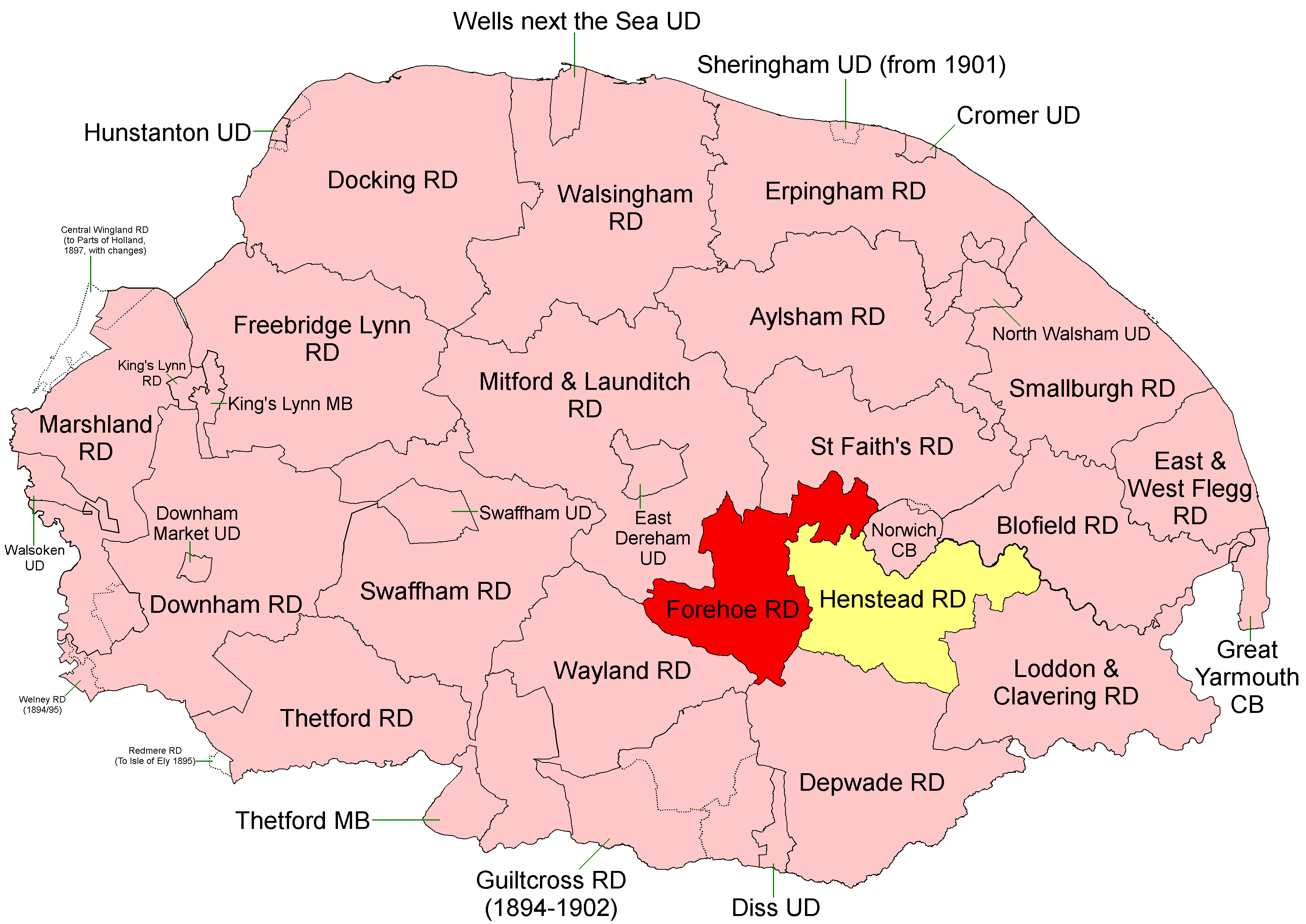
Boundaries in 1894. Forehoe RD in red, Henstead RD yellow.

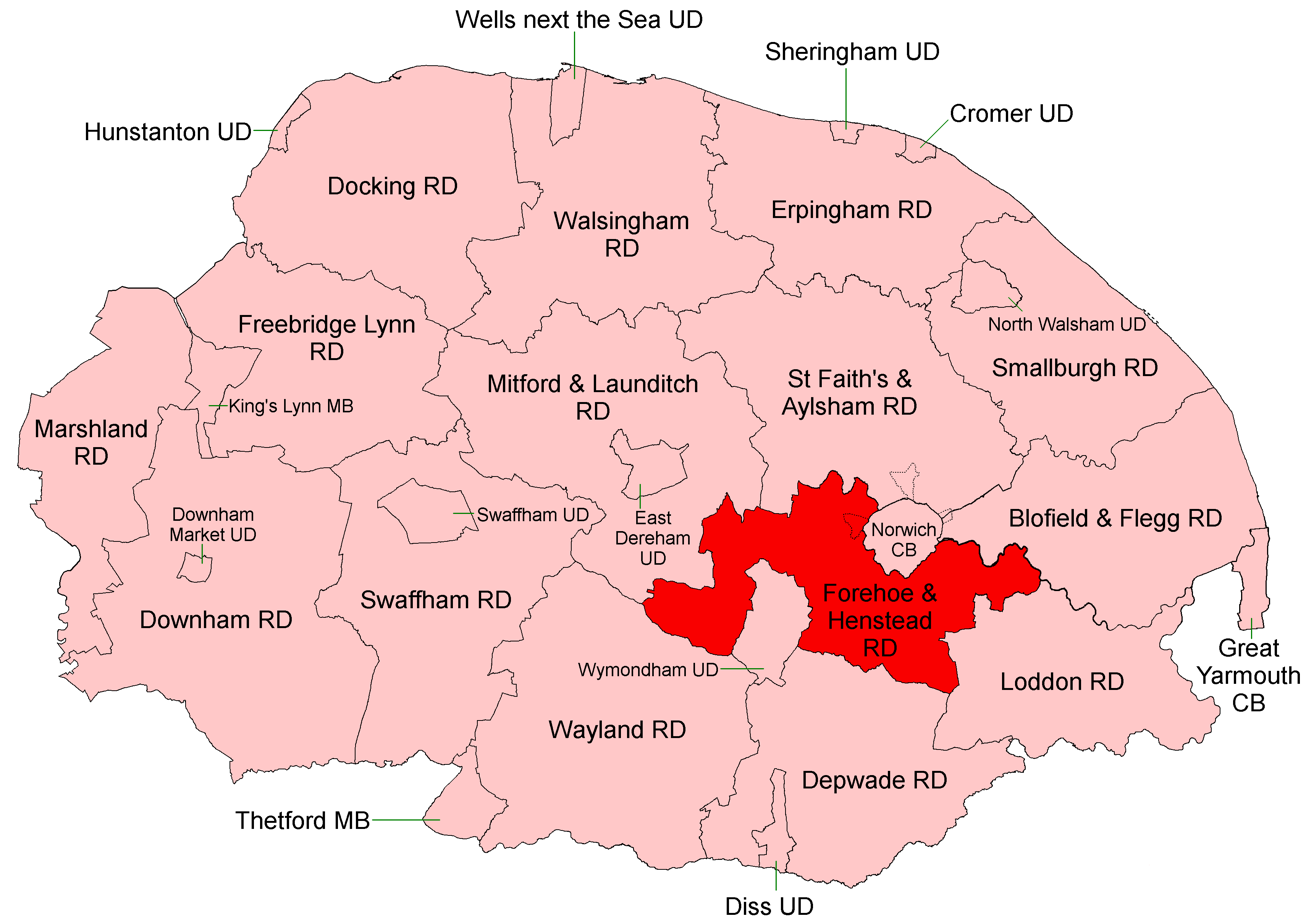
Boundaries in 1935

Forehoe and Henstead Rural Districts were adjacent rural districts in Norfolk, England from 1894 to 1935.

They were formed under the Local Government Act 1894 based on rural sanitary districts of the same names, and lay generally south of Norwich.

In 1935 the Wymondham parish of Forehoe RD was created a new Wymondham Urban District. The remainder, together with the whole of Henstead RD apart from an island in the River Yare, were merged to form Forehoe and Henstead Rural District. Subsequently, changes to the border with Norwich County Borough were made in 1968.

In 1974, the merged district was abolished under the Local Government Act 1972, and became part of the South Norfolk district.

== Statistics ==
Year	Forehoe RD			Henstead RD		
Year	Area (ha)	Population	Density (pop/ha)	Area (ha)	Population	Density (pop/ha)
1911	15,592	11,383	0.73	17,151	10,285	0.60
1921	15,592	11,305	0.73	17,151	9,901	0.58
1931	15,592	12,910	0.83	17,151	10,779	0.63
	Forehoe and Henstead RD					
1951	28,304	23,376	0.83			
1961	28,304	25,860	0.91			

== Parishes ==
These parishes lay within Forehoe and Henstead RD unless otherwise indicated.

Parish	From	To	Notes
Arminghall		1935	Henstead RD. Added to Bixley
Barford			Forehoe RD
Barnham Broom			Forehoe RD
Bawburgh			Forehoe RD
Bixley			Henstead RD
Bowthorpe		1935	Forehoe RD. Added to Runhall
Bracon Ash			Henstead RD
Bramerton			Henstead RD
Brandon Parva		1935	Forehoe RD. Added to Runhall
Caistor St Edmund			Henstead RD
Carleton Forehoe		1935	Forehoe RD. Added to Kimberley
Colney			Henstead RD
Colton		1935	Forehoe RD. Added to Marlingford
Costessey			Forehoe RD
Coston		1935	Forehoe RD. Added to Runhall
Cringleford			Henstead RD
Crownthorpe		1935	Forehoe RD. Added to Wicklewood
Deopham			Forehoe RD
Dunston		1935	Henstead RD. Added to Stoke Holy Cross
East Carleton			Henstead RD
Easton			Forehoe RD
Flordon			Henstead RD
Framingham Earl			Henstead RD
Framingham Pigot			Henstead RD
Great Melton			Henstead RD
Hackford		1935	Forehoe RD. Added to Deopham
Hethersett			Henstead RD
Hingham			Forehoe RD
Holverston			Henstead RD
Intwood		1935	Henstead RD. Added to Keswick
Keswick			Henstead RD
Ketteringham			Henstead RD
Kimberley			Forehoe RD
Kirby Bedon			Henstead RD
Little Melton			Henstead RD
Markshall		1935	Henstead RD. Added to Caistor St Edmund
Marlingford			Forehoe RD
Morley			Merger of 2 Morley parishes
Morley St Botolph		1935	Forehoe RD. Component of Morley
Morley St Peter		1935	Forehoe RD. Component of Morley
Mulbarton			Henstead RD
Newton Flotman			Henstead RD
Poringland			Henstead RD
Rockland St Mary			Henstead RD
Runhall			Forehoe RD
Saxlingham Nethergate			Henstead RD
Saxlingham Thorpe		1925	Henstead RD. Added to Saxlingham Nethergate
Shotesham	1935		Merger of 2 Shotesham parishes
Shotesham All Saints		1935	Henstead RD
Shotesham St Mary		1935	Henstead RD
Stoke Holy Cross			Henstead RD
Surlingham			Henstead RD
Swainsthorpe			Henstead RD
Swardeston			Henstead RD
Trowse with Newton			Henstead RD
Welborne		1935	Forehoe RD. Added to Runhall
Whitlingham		1935	Henstead RD. Added to Kirby Bedon
Wicklewood			Forehoe RD
Wramplingham			Forehoe RD
Wreningham			Henstead RD
Wymondham		1935	Forehoe RD. Became Wymondham UD
