= Concrete bridge =

Bridge constructed out of concrete

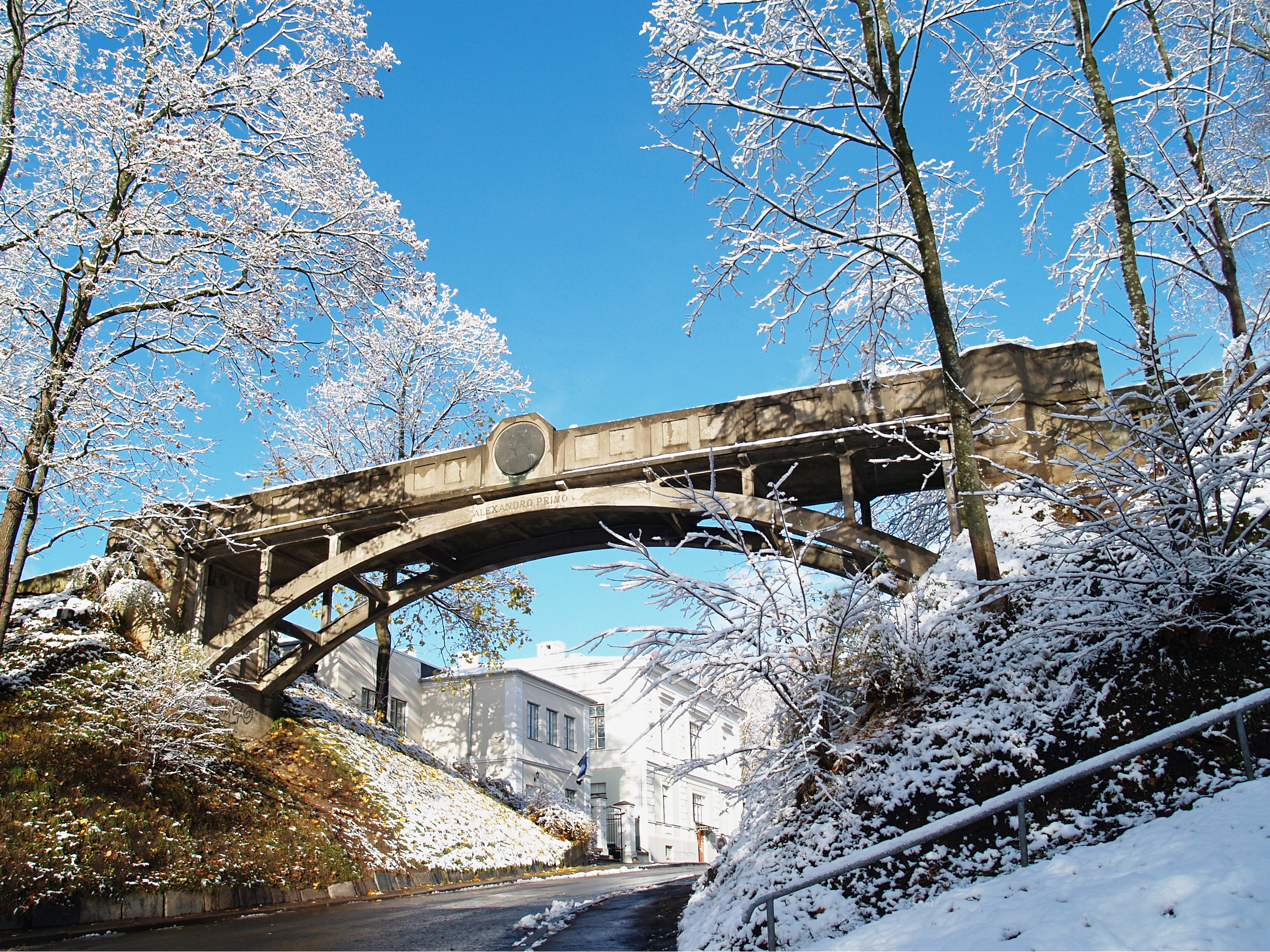
The Devil's Bridge (Kuradisild) in Tartu, Estonia, constructed in 1913

Concrete bridges are a type of bridge, constructed out of concrete. They started to appear widely in the early 20th century.

== History ==
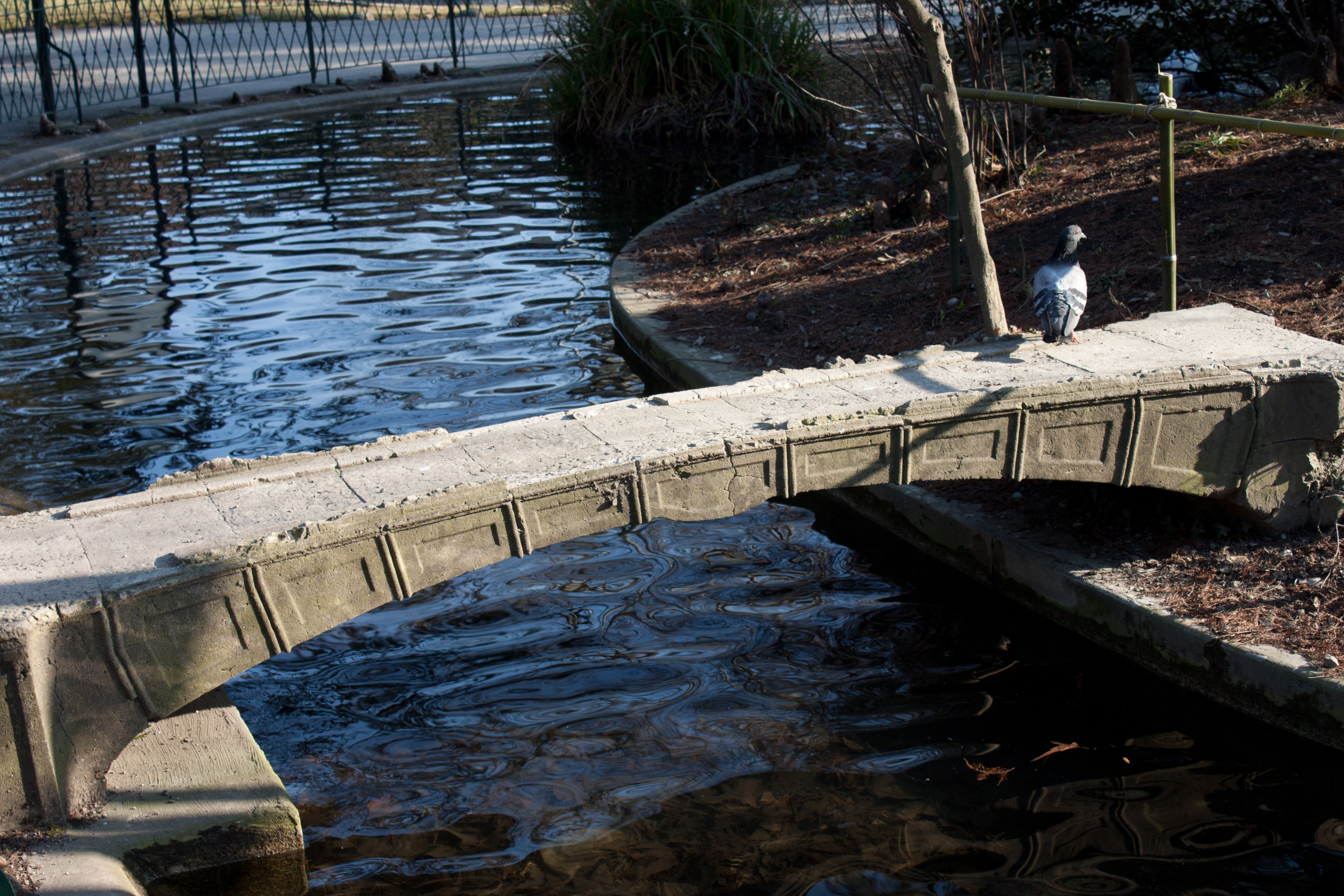
Pont du Jardin des plantes, Grenoble, poured concrete foorbridge, constructed 1855.

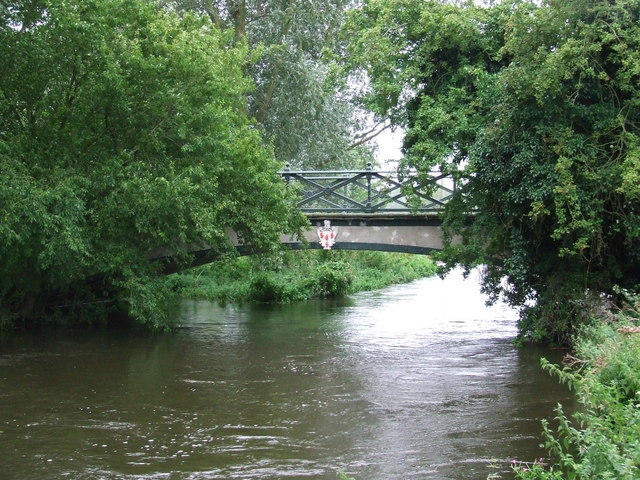
Homersfield Bridge, England, cast iron reinforced, constructed 1869-1870

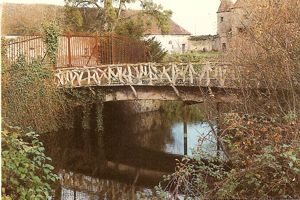
Bridge across the moat at Château de Chazelet, constructed 1875.

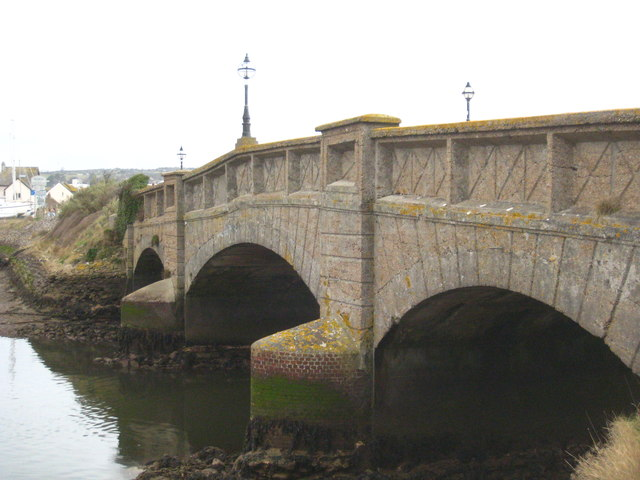
Axmouth bridge, constructed 1877.

Unreinforced concrete has been used in bridge construction since antiquity: the Romans incorporated concrete cores into a number of their masonry bridges and aqueducts, along with constructing spanning water conduits of concrete. From the late 18th century cast iron framed bridges may have had an unreinforced cast concrete deck, or had their structure encased in concrete, for example the Homersfield Bridge, constructed between 1869 and 1870, between the English counties of Suffolk and Norfolk. In 1873, Frenchman Joseph Monier obtained a French patent for a method of iron-wire reinforced concrete bridge construction; his first iron-wire reinforced concrete bridge was constructed across the moat of the marquis de Tillièrein's fr:Château de Chazelet, in 1875. This and all later bridges made according to Monier's system patterned the construction of previously used stone bridges. Their main structural unit was an arch barrel. All barrel sections were reinforced similarly, regardless of the forces acting on them.

The US's longest unreinforced concrete span was the 200 feet (61 m) arch of the 1910 Rocky River Bridge in Cleveland, Ohio.

Early extant examples include:

== Finland ==
- Savisilta "clay bridge", Ylivieska, the second oldest concrete bridge in Finland. (reinforced concrete, constructed 1912).

== France ==
- Pont du jardin des plantes, Grenoble, footbridge (cast concrete, constructed 1855)
- Bridge across the moat at Château de Chazelet (iron-wire reinforced concrete, constructed 1875)

== United Kingdom ==
- Homersfield Bridge, River Waveney, England (cast and wrought iron reinforced, span 50 feet (15 m), constructed 1869-1870)
- Axmouth Bridge, on the River Axe at Seaton, Devon (unreinforced, middle span 50 feet (15 m), opened 1877)
- Glenfinnan Viaduct, Scotland (unreinforced, twenty-one 50 feet (15 m) spans, constructed 1897–1901)
- Waterloo Bridge (reinforced cast concrete, longest span 233 feet (71 m), opened 1942)

== United States ==
- Alvord Lake Bridge, Golden Gate Park, San Francisco (reinforced concrete, 29 feet (8.8 m) span, 1889).
- Walnut Lane Bridge, Philadelphia, PA (unreinforced concrete, 233 feet (71 m) span, 1908)
- Rocky River Bridge, Cleveland, Ohio (unreinforced concrete, 280 feet (85 m) span, 1910)
