= James Douglas (antiquary) =

English cleric, antiquarian and artist

James Douglas (7 January 1753 – 11 November 1819) was an English cleric, antiquarian and artist.

== Early life ==
Douglas was born on 7 January 1753 in London. He was the third and youngest surviving son of John Douglas, an innkeeper in Hyde Park Road, London. After the death of most of the family, he went north to stay with his brother William, a cloth merchant in Manchester, and attended Manchester grammar school.

Douglas travelled on business for his brother William, but they fell out when he misused funds. He entered the Austrian Army, dropping out when on a mission to Great Britain. He entered Peterhouse, Cambridge in 1777; and in 1779 he served under Hugh Debbieg in the Leicestershire militia. In 1780 he was elected a Fellow of the Society of Antiquaries of London, and took holy orders.

== Clergyman ==
The early part of Douglas's ministry was at Chiddingfold, Surrey. On 17 November 1787 he was instituted to the rectory of Litchborough, Northamptonshire, on the presentation of Sir William Addington, and towards the end of that year he was appointed one of the Prince of Wales's chaplains. He resigned Litchborough in 1799 on being presented by the lord chancellor, through the recommendation of the Earl of Egremont, to the rectory of Middleton, Sussex. In 1803 he was presented by Lord Henniker to the vicarage of Kenton, Suffolk.

The closing years of Douglas's life were spent at Preston, Sussex, where he died on 11 November 1819.

== Works ==
Douglas wrote:

- A General Essay on Military Tactics; with an introductory Discourse, translated from the French of Jacques Antoine Hippolyte, Comte de Guibert, 2 vols. Lond. 1781.
- Travelling Anecdotes, through various parts of Europe, vol. i. (all published), Rochester, 1782 (anon.); 2nd edit. with the author's name, Lond. 1785; 3rd edit., Lond., 1786. Influenced by Laurence Sterne, with plates drawn and etched by the author.
- A Dissertation on the Antiquity of the Earth, Lond. 1785.
- Two Dissertations on the Brass Instruments called Celts, and other Arms used by the Antients, found in this Island, with two aquatint engravings. It formed No. 33 of the Bibliotheca Topographica Britannica, vol. i. 1785.
- Nenia Britannica, or a Sepulchral History of Great Britain, from the earliest period to its general conversion to Christianity, Lond. 1793, dedicated to the Prince of Wales. Published in numbers (1786–93) at 5s. each. It contains a description of British, Roman, and Saxon sepulchral rites and ceremonies, and also of the contents of several hundred ancient places of interment opened under the inspection of the author, with added observations on Celtic, British, Roman, and Danish barrows discovered in Great Britain. The tombs, with all their contents, are represented in aquatint plates executed by Douglas. Objects found by Douglas in his excavations and engraved in this work were sold by his widow to Sir Richard Colt Hoare, who in 1829 presented them to the Ashmolean Museum at Oxford.
- On the Urbs Rutupiæ of Ptolemy, and the Limden-pic of the Saxons, in vol. i. of Bibliotheca Topographica Britannica, 1787.
- Discourses on the Influence of the Christian Religion on Civil Society, Lond. 1792.

Douglas painted portraits of his friends, both in oil and in miniature. In 1795 he contributed to John Nichols's Leicestershire a plate of St Michael's Church, Coston engraved by himself. He also engraved the full-length portrait of Francis Grose.

== Family ==
In January 1780 Douglas married Margaret, daughter of John Oldershaw of Rochester, Kent, an eminent surgeon in Leicester.
