= Runhall =

Village in Norfolk, England

Coordinates: 52.62201°N 1.03356°E

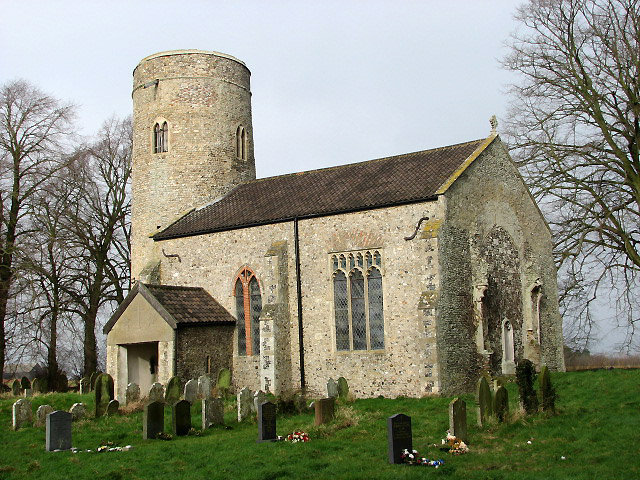
- All Saints, Runhall

- Location within Norfolk
- Area: 11.98 km^{2} (4.63 sq mi)
- Population: 401 (2011)
  - Density: 33/km^{2} (85/sq mi)
- OS grid reference: TG054070
- Civil parish: Brandon Parva, Coston, Runhall and Welborne
- District: South Norfolk
- Shire county: Norfolk
- Region: East
- Country: England
- Sovereign state: United Kingdom
- Post town: NORWICH
- Postcode district: NR9
- Police: Norfolk
- Fire: Norfolk
- Ambulance: East of England

Runhall is a village and former civil parish, now in the parish of Brandon Parva, Coston, Runhall and Welborne, in the South Norfolk district, in Norfolk, England. The parish covers an area of 11.98 km^{2} (4.63 sq mi) and had a population of 365 in 137 households at the 2001 census, including Welborne and increasing in the 2011 Census to a population of 401 in 148 households.

The villages name origin is uncertain possibly, 'tree-trunk nook of land', 'Runa's nook of land', or perhaps, 'council's nook of land'.

Its church, All Saints, is one of 124 existing round-tower churches in Norfolk.

== Civil parish ==
On 1 April 1935 the parishes of Brandon Parva, Coston and Welborne were merged with Runhall, on 28 January 2013 the merged parish was renamed "Brandon Parva, Coston, Runhall and Welborne". In 1931 the parish of Runhall (prior to the merge) had a population of 169.
