= Alan Breeze =

English singer (1909–1980)

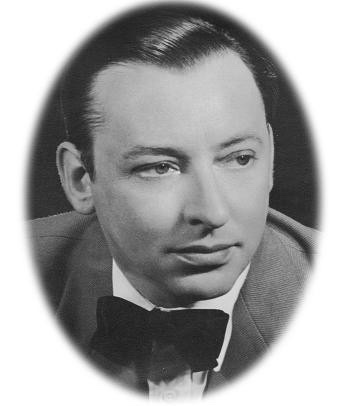
- Alan Breeze in the mid 1930s
- Born: 9 October 1909; West Ham, London, England
- Died: 15 January 1980 (aged 70); Norwich, Norfolk, England
- Occupation: Singer
- Spouse: Irene May Breeze (née Murdoch)
- Children: 4
- Parent(s): Louis & Isobel Breeze
- Website: alanbreeze.com

Alan Louis Breeze (9 October 1909 – 15 January 1980) was an English singer of the British dance band era and regular entertainer on the post-war BBC radio programme the Billy Cotton Band Show.

He was born in West Ham, London, to Louis Breeze, a concert and oratorio singer and a member of the D'Oyly Carte Opera Company, and his wife Isobel, who taught with the old London County Council.

At the beginning of his career, Breeze sang in working men's clubs, restaurants and even theatre queues. He made a number of recordings, such as "I've Got a Lovely Bunch of Coconuts". He also dubbed the singing voice at film studios for actors.

Breeze's meeting with the band leader Billy Cotton was to change his career. Breeze started with Cotton in 1932, without a contract, and stayed for 36 years. He became one of the most popular UK vocalists, on radio, television and in theatres around the United Kingdom.

In 1968, Breeze, Hylda Baker, and John Neville starred in the musical Mr. and Mrs., which opened at the Palace Theatre, Manchester, before transferring to The Palace Theatre, London. An LP and single were released from the show.

Breeze latterly lived in Hingham, Norfolk, in The Thatched Cottage, a Grade II-listed building. He died on 15 January 1980 in Norwich, Norfolk, aged 70.
