= Hellington =

Hamlet in Norfolk, England

Coordinates: 52.57734°N 1.41355°E

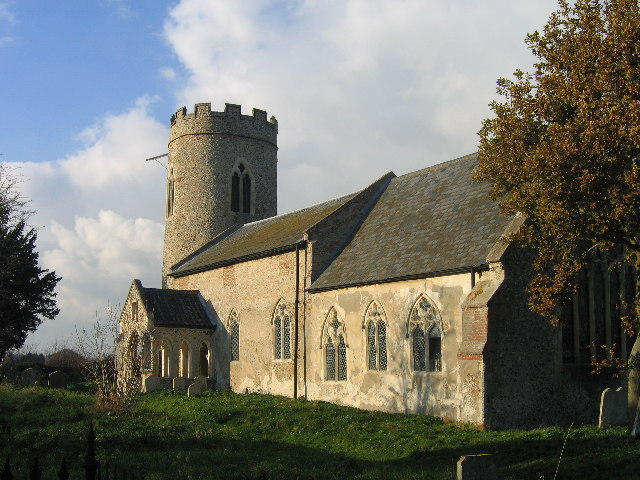
- St John the Baptist, Hellington

- Location within Norfolk
- Area: 2.14 km^{2} (0.83 sq mi)
- Population: 69
  - Density: 32/km^{2} (83/sq mi)
- OS grid reference: TG313031
- Civil parish: Hellington
- District: South Norfolk
- Shire county: Norfolk
- Region: East
- Country: England
- Sovereign state: United Kingdom
- Post town: NORWICH
- Postcode district: NR14
- Dialling code: 01508
- Police: Norfolk
- Fire: Norfolk
- Ambulance: East of England

Hellington is a hamlet and civil parish in the South Norfolk district of the county of Norfolk, England. In the 2001 census, it contained 24 households and a population of 69.

It is centred on a crossroads 1/2 mile (4/5 km) south of Rockland St. Mary and around 6 1/2 miles (10.5 km) southeast of Norwich. The road north leads to Rockland St. Mary, south leads to the church and to Hellington Corner on the A146. East and west from the crossroads are both no through roads. East leads to Hellington Hall, a Grade II Listed 17th-century country house, and Low Common, a Norfolk Wildlife Trust County Wildlife Site. West leads to Holverston.

== Church of St John the Baptist ==
The church, St John the Baptist, is one of 124 existing round-tower churches in Norfolk, and is a Grade I listed building . It contains a bronze war memorial to the dead and serving soldiers from World War I (memorial details).
