= St John the Baptist's Church, Hellington =

Coordinates: 52.5761°N 1.4128°E

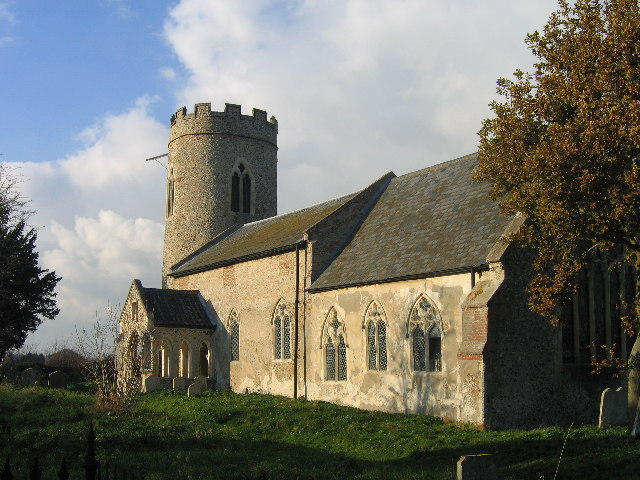
- St John the Baptist's Church, Hellington, from the southeast

- Location in Norfolk
- OS grid reference: NZ 274 513
- Location: Hellington, Norfolk
- Country: England
- Denomination: Anglican
- Website: Churches Conservation Trust

History
- Dedication: Saint John the Baptist

Architecture
- Functional status: Redundant
- Heritage designation: Grade I
- Designated: 5 September 1960
- Architectural type: Church
- Style: Norman, Gothic

Specifications
- Materials: Flint and brick with limestone dressings Roofs slated and tiled

St John the Baptist's Church is a redundant Anglican church standing to the south of the village of Hellington, Norfolk, England. It is recorded in the National Heritage List for England as a designated Grade I listed building, and is under the care of the Churches Conservation Trust.

== History ==
St John's Church originated in the 12th century. Most of the fabric in the church dates from this century and from the 14th century. The roofs currently present were added later.

== Architecture ==
=== Exterior ===
The church is constructed in flint and brick with limestone dressings. The roofs of the nave and chancel are slated, and the porch roof is tiled. Its plan is simple, consisting of a nave with a south porch, a chancel, and a west tower. The tower is round and dates from the 12th century. The two-light bell openings were inserted in the 14th century. The parapet is from a later date, and is embattled. The south porch was added in the 14th century, and has been much patched and repaired since. On each side of the entrance are diagonally-set niches, and there are the remains of another niche in the gable above the entrance. On the west and east sides of the porch are three open arches. The south doorway is Norman in style with a round-headed arch. It is "very elaborate". The arch is carried on three orders of shafts, with capitals decorated with scallops and volutes. The arch also has three orders, decorated with fillets between them. The windows in the nave and chancel date from the 14th century and contain a variety of Decorated motifs. The east window has five lights and, above it, the gable carries a cross. In the north wall of the nave is a two-light square-headed window, and a Norman doorway with two orders of shafts. The north wall of the chancel, which has been re-built in brick, is supported by pilaster-buttresses, and a larger buttress at the southeast corner.

=== Interior ===
The tower arch is round-headed, and the chancel arch has a pointed arch. In the chancel is a 14th-century piscina with two arches. There are some fragments of medieval glass in the south chancel window. The font is octagonal, its bowl being decorated with quatrefoil panels. The stained glass in the east window dates from the middle of the 19th century, and was made by J. and J. King of Norwich.

== See also ==
- List of churches preserved by the Churches Conservation Trust in the East of England
