= Heywood, Norfolk =

Civil parish in Norfolk, England

Coordinates: 52.418°N 1.121°E

Heywood
- Location within Norfolk
- Area: 9.56 km^{2} (3.69 sq mi)
- Population: 222
  - Density: 23/km^{2} (60/sq mi)
- OS grid reference: TM123845
- Civil parish: Heywood
- District: South Norfolk
- Shire county: Norfolk
- Region: East
- Country: England
- Sovereign state: United Kingdom
- Post town: DISS
- Postcode district: IP22
- Police: Norfolk
- Fire: Norfolk
- Ambulance: East of England

Heywood is a civil parish in the English county of Norfolk. It was formed in 2003 from a part of the parish of Diss. It covers an area of 9.56 km^{2} (3.69 sq mi) and had a population of 175 in 63 households at the 2001 census, the population increasing to 222 in 79 households at the 2011 Census. For the purposes of local government, it falls within the district of South Norfolk.
