= Hingham, Norfolk =

Market town in Norfolk, England

Coordinates: 52.57910°N 0.98284°E

Hingham
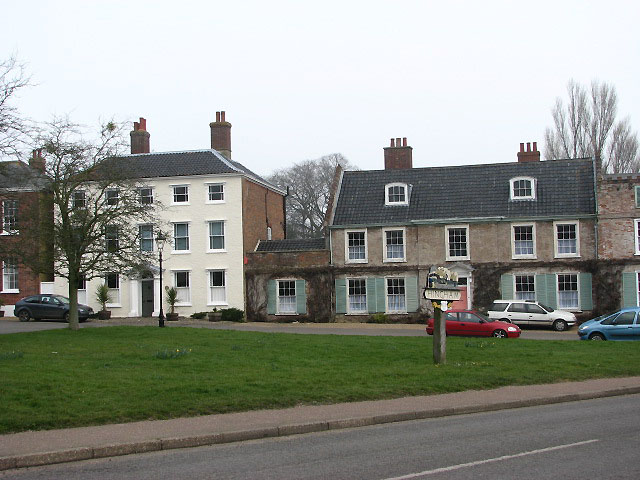
- Georgian houses at Market Place

- Location within Norfolk
- Area: 14.97 km^{2} (5.78 sq mi)
- Population: 2,543 (2021)
  - Density: 170/km^{2} (440/sq mi)
- OS grid reference: TG 022 021
  - London: 99 miles (159 km)
- Civil parish: Hingham
- District: South Norfolk
- Shire county: Norfolk
- Region: East
- Country: England
- Sovereign state: United Kingdom
- Post town: NORWICH
- Postcode district: NR9
- Dialling code: 01953
- Police: Norfolk
- Fire: Norfolk
- Ambulance: East of England
- UK Parliament: Mid Norfolk

Hingham is a market town and civil parish in mid-Norfolk, England. The civil parish covers an area of 14.98 km^{2} (5.78 sq mi) and had a population of 2,543 in 1,184 households at the 2021 census.

Grand architecture surrounds the historic market place and town greens. According to an 18th-century source, a fire destroyed many of the town's buildings, leading the better-off local families to build the handsome Georgian homes for which the town is known. The same source claims that the Hingham gentry were "so fashionable in their dress that the town is called by the neighbours 'Little London'".

Hingham is 13 miles (21 km) west from Norwich, Norfolk's county town. While many Hingham people now work in Norwich, commuting by car or bus, the town has maintained a range of shops and businesses in its historic streets and an industrial estate on Ironside Way. Despite the influence and attractions of Norwich, an active and independent town life continues to thrive and grow in Hingham. A fair visits every year, setting up on the historic Fairlands (an area of several triangular greens). There is a state-run school, providing education for children from the ages of 4–11.

== History ==
=== Early history (pre-1066 – 17th century) ===
The town's name derives from the homestead or village of "Hega's people".

The town, originally spelled "Hengham", is an ancient settlement, as its Saxon name denotes. It was the property of King Athelstan, in 925, and of William the Conqueror in 1066 and 1086 as a well populated parish in the hundred of Forehoe, and retained many privileges coming from its royal ownership, including "the grandeur of ... St Andrew's," a parish church rebuilt in the 1300s. Thomas de Morley, 5th Baron Morley is buried in its chancel. In the years that followed, the town was a clear royal domain, for William the Conqueror and many others.

In 1414 the town was exempted from an English toll and in 1610, the town was granted a royal charter by James I. Over the years, from 1154 to 1887, the town's church is recorded as having had 32 rectors. (Note: These rectors include but are not limited to John de Bridport (1154), son of John de Bridport (1199), Master Richard of Felmingham (1272), John de Calton (1307), William Winor of Swanton (1313), Remigius de Hethersett (1316), Master John de Ufford (1359), and Master John de Darlington (1375).)

By the 1600s, the town of Hingham was still agricultural. John Speed's maps of the Kingdom of England during the Jacobean period in 1610 and 1611 showed that the town was near Wymondham (also called Wimundham or Windham). This town was, at the time, situated in the countryside with diverse terrain, profuse windmills, well-watered soil, a large degree of inland water traffic, and few urban centres apart from Norwich, where a thriving cloth industry boomed. With Speed's drawing of a castle at the location of Hingham, the town must have been of some stature.

=== Emigration and recovery (17th – 18th century) ===
Many Puritans refused to conform to the wishes of the King (Charles I) and his loyal Archbishop (William Laud), so they fled to the Plymouth Bay or Massachusetts Bay colonies, in what has been labelled the "Great Migration". In 1633, migration from England to the Americas began with a number of participants on a ship named the Bonaventure. Robert Peck, the Rector of St Andrew's Church, and his associate Peter Hobart, emigrated to the new colony of Massachusetts with half of his congregation, most likely all of the 133 people on the Diligent, which departed in June 1638 from Ipswich, England. Peck had been censured by religious authorities for his Puritan practices, and his daughter had married the son of another well-known Puritan minister named John Rogers.

The passengers on the Diligent, working-class people such as shoemakers and millers, a number of ministers, and gentry, were mostly Puritans. Once there, the passengers founded "New" Hingham, to remind them of "Old" Hingham. Once most of the passengers settled there, the population of the town had doubled. More specifically they were called East Anglians, after the former Kingdom of East Angles in which Hingham resided, as John Speed described it in 1610. Amongst those who had emigrated were Samuel Lincoln, ancestor of President Abraham Lincoln, and Edward Gilman Sr., ancestor of Nicholas Gilman, New Hampshire delegate to the Continental Congress and signer of the U.S. Constitution. To commemorate the lineage of Lincoln and the sister town in Massachusetts, today the town hall "is named the Lincoln Hall, and ... the bust of Abraham Lincoln takes pride of place in the north aisle of the church" along with memorials to the Gilman family.

The parishioners who left Hingham had been so prominent in the Hingham community that the town was forced to petition Parliament, saying their town had been devastated by the emigration. They told the House of Commons that "most of the able Inhabitants have forsaken their dwellings and have gone severall ways for their peace and quiett and the town is now left and like in the misery by reason of the meanness of the [remaining] Inhabitants." The argument by the remaining residents of Hingham that their town had been devastated was not unfounded. Historians and original documents from the time attest that "physically, mentally, socially, and spiritually" the town was moved from England to New England with the founding of "New" Hingham in 1635, with Peter Hobart and Robert Peck as some the most powerful and well-off individuals in the new town, at the top of the Old Ship Church.

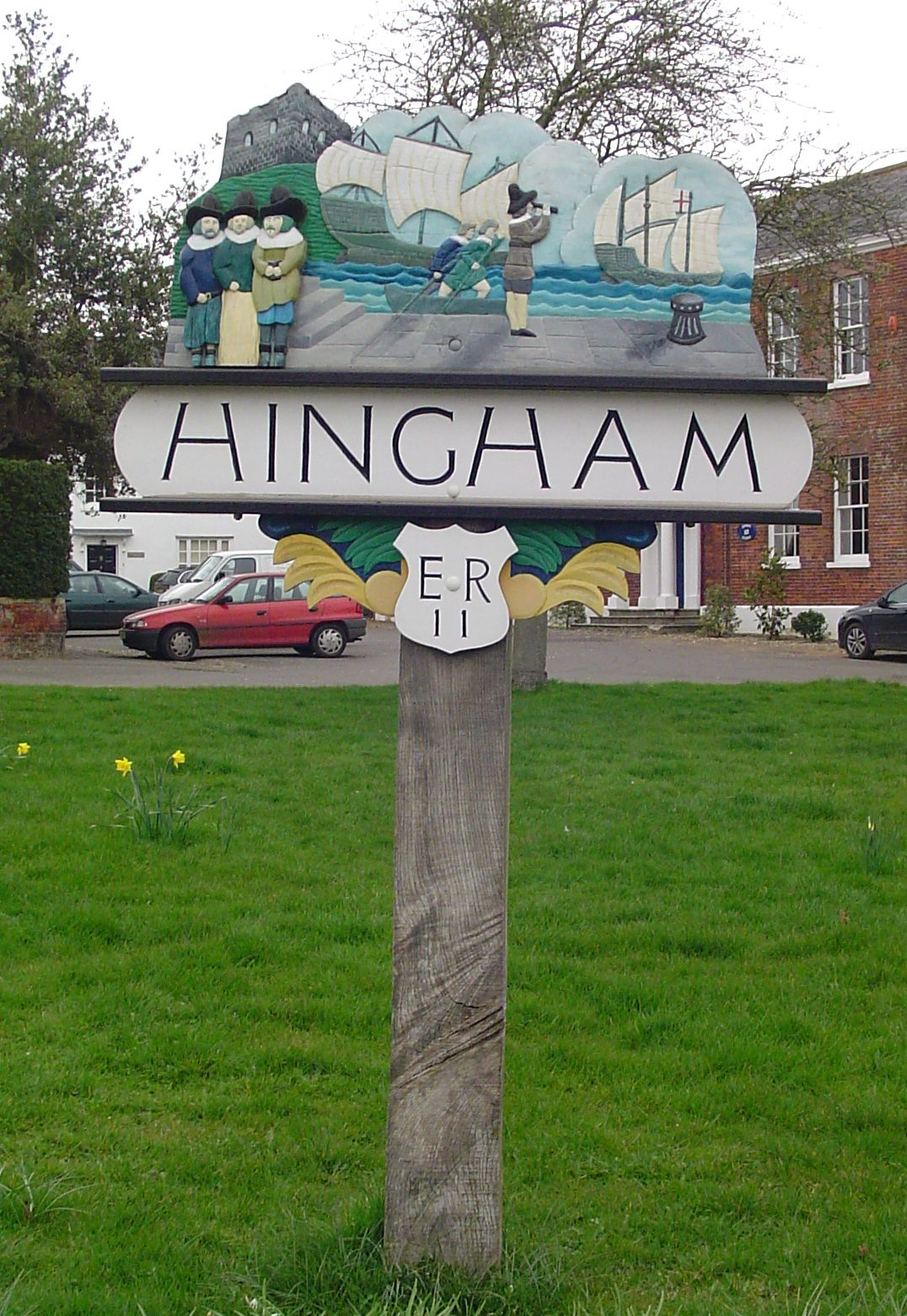
Town sign in Hingham

In the years that followed, Hingham continued to develop. Apart from the "sentimental attachment" between the Hingham in England and that in the Americas, St Andrew's Church continued to stand, inns were created, and what is today a conservation area was created which "contains many Georgian buildings," although many of the buildings were destroyed in a "disastrous fire in 1688". Even with changing prices and inconsistent weather, the town remained agricultural and had a stayed gentry in place into at least the 1740s.

=== 19th and 20th centuries ===
By the 1800s, Admiral Philip Wodehouse lived in the town. By the 1890s, it was still a "small market town". During World War I, 200 men from the town participated in the forces, 38 of whom perished on the battlefield, others who formed a company, and some who paid for war certificates. In later years, World War I general Edmund Ironside lived in Southernwood, a house created in the 1700s where he died in 1959, an old windmill continued to turn in the town until 1937, later becoming a "4 storey stump", a radio link between the two Hinghams was established in World War II, and the Lincoln Hall was built in 1922, later rebuilt and extended in 1977. Other than that, the town has also maintained its connection with its sister town in the United States; for instance, in September 1985, a number of Hingham residents attended "the 350th birthday celebrations of Hingham, Mass.".

=== 21st century ===
Historical population
| Year | Pop. | ±% |
|---|---|---|
| 2001 | 2,078 | — |
| 2011 | 2,367 | +13.9% |
| 2021 | 2,543 | +7.4% |

In 2000, it was reported that Adrian Semmence, whose family had farmed at Hingham for three generations, was opening a woodland park (to be funded by the sale of 36-square-foot (3.3 m^{2}) plots, mainly to Americans having connections with Hingham) to commemorate the links between this Hingham and Hingham, Massachusetts.

The Caterham F1 team, previously Team Lotus, was based in Hingham, but left Norfolk and relocated to the old Arrows team factory near Silverstone Circuit in Northamptonshire. It used to be based in nearby Hethel, but following its bankruptcy in 1994 there was not much activity until Lotus was resurrected as an F1 team in 2010.

== Transport and connections ==
The nearest railway stations are around 6 miles away in Wymondham and Attleborough, both on the Breckland Line. A heritage railway station exists around 3 miles away in nearby Hardingham, on the Mid-Norfolk Railway, but receives only occasional leisure and sightseer services.

Hingham is situated on the B1108 road, which is the major route connecting Watton, 6 miles to the west of Hingham, to Norwich.

The town receives regular bus services to Watton and Norwich, averaging approximately every 30 minutes on weekdays and Saturdays and every 2 hours on Sundays. Routes 3, 3B, and 3C run a combined hourly service on weekdays and Saturdays (roughly every 2 hours on Sundays) from Watton via Carbrooke (3C only), Scoulton, Hingham, Kimberley, Barnham Broom (3B only), Barford, and Norfolk and Norwich University Hospital. Some peak hour services also serve University of East Anglia. Route 6 runs an hourly service on Mondays to Saturdays from Watton to Norwich via Scoulton, Hingham, Wicklewood, Wymondham, and Hethersett. Some services on route 6 additionally serve Carbrooke between Watton and Scoulton, or Norfolk and Norwich University Hospital between Hethersett and Norwich. The service does not run on Sundays. An additional return service to and from Dereham Market is offered on Tuesday and Friday mornings as route 17. As of 2026, all bus services serving the town are operated by Central Connect.

== Governance ==
The civil parish of Hingham is governed by a town council.

The parish has been part of the local government district of South Norfolk since 1974. Hingham is part of the electoral ward of Hingham and Deopham, which returns one councillor to South Norfolk Council, elected every four years. The population of this ward at the 2011 census was 2,908.

At a county level, Hingham is part of the electoral division also called Hingham, which returns one councillor to Norfolk County Council, elected every four years.

From 2028, Hingham is expected to form part of the new unitary authority of West Norfolk, whose council will replace both South Norfolk Council and Norfolk County Council in the area.

From 1894 to 1935, Hingham was in the Forehoe Rural District in Norfolk. From 1935 to 1974, it was in the merged Forehoe and Henstead Rural District.

== Notable people ==
- Samuel Lincoln (1622-1690), settler and progenitor of many notable United States political figures, including his 4th-great-grandson President Abraham Lincoln and his 3rd-great-grandson Maine governor Enoch Lincoln.
- Alan Breeze (1909–1980), British dance band singer, primarily known for his work with Billy Cotton, lived in The Thatched Cottage, a Grade II-listed building on Bond Street, at the time of his death.

== See also ==
- Sea Mere, Hingham – a Site of Special Scientific Interest in the parish
