= Hethel =

Village in Norfolk, England

Coordinates: 52.55°N 1.2°E

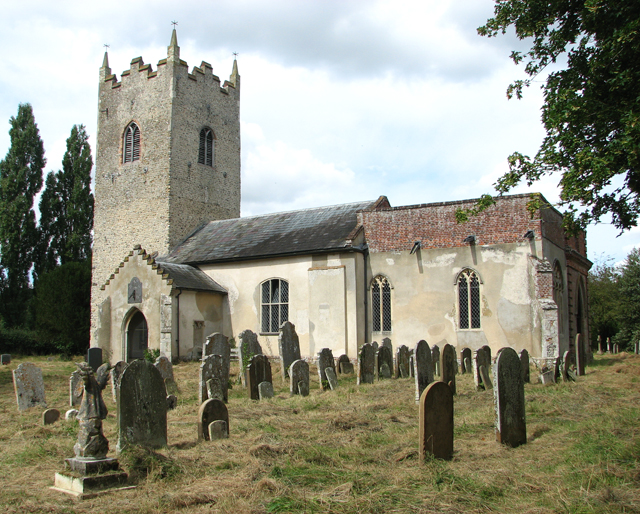

- Location within Norfolk
- Civil parish: Bracon Ash
- District: South Norfolk
- Shire county: Norfolk
- Region: East
- Country: England
- Sovereign state: United Kingdom
- Post town: NORWICH
- Postcode district: NR14
- Dialling code: 01508
- UK Parliament: South Norfolk

Hethel is a small village in the civil parish of Bracon Ash, in the South Norfolk district, in the English county of Norfolk.

Hethel is located five miles (8.0 km) south-east of the market town of Wymondham, and approximately ten miles (16 km) south of the city of Norwich.

== History ==
Hethel's name is of Anglo-Saxon origin and derives from the Old English for heather hill.

In the Domesday Book, Hethel is listed as a settlement of 21 households in the hundred of Humbleyard. In 1086, the village was divided between the estates of Roger Bigod and Judicael the Priest.

Hethel Hall was built in the Seventeenth Century and was demolished in the 1950s.

On 1 April 1935, the parish was abolished and merged with Bracon Ash.

== Geography ==
In 1931, the parish had a population of 118.

Hethel is noted for containing the oldest known living hawthorn tree in East Anglia and possibly in the United Kingdom (reputed to be more than 700 years old). Planted in the 13th century, "Hethel Old Thorn" (a specimen of Common Hawthorn, Crataegus monogyna) is in the village churchyard, which is classified as the smallest reserve under the care of the British Wildlife Trusts partnership.

== All Saints' Church ==
Hethel's church dates from the medieval period. All Saints' is located on Church Road and has been Grade I listed since 1959. All Saints' is no longer open for Sunday service.

All Saints' features an elaborate marble memorial to Miles Branthwaite and his wife, Mary.

== Hethel Airfield ==
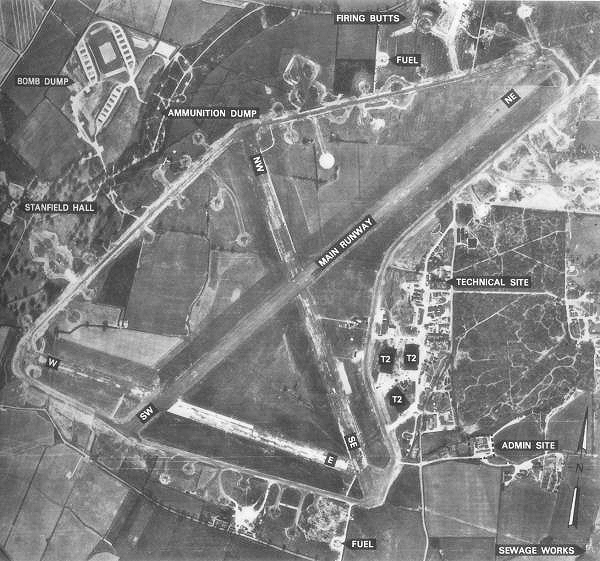
RAF Hethel in WW2

RAF Hethel was an airfield used by the US during the Second World War, and later by the RAF. Located 7 miles (11 km) south west of Norwich, it was constructed in 1942 for American use and assigned USAAF designation "Station 114". From 14 September 1943 through to 12 June 1945, Hethel served as headquarters for the 2nd Combat Bombardment Wing of the 2nd Bomb Division.

After the departure of the Americans, it was assigned to RAF Fighter Command. On 25 June Polish-manned North American Mustang RAF squadrons moved into the base. In mid-1947, Hethel became a Personnel Transit Centre but was transferred to RAF Technical Training Command. With the downsizing of the RAF, the field was closed in 1948. For many years the base was inactive and abandoned until it was finally sold by the Air Ministry in 1964.

For a number of years the old airfield Nissen huts were used to house families awaiting re-housing under the post-war building programme. Forehoe and Henstead RDC also used part of the area as a store depot. With the end of military control, Hethel became the manufacturing and testing site for Lotus Cars. The manufacture of vehicles, originally started in the old hangars and workshops, now takes place in several modern buildings. Lotus uses parts of the airfield perimeter track and lengths of the main runway as a testing track.

== Lotus Cars ==
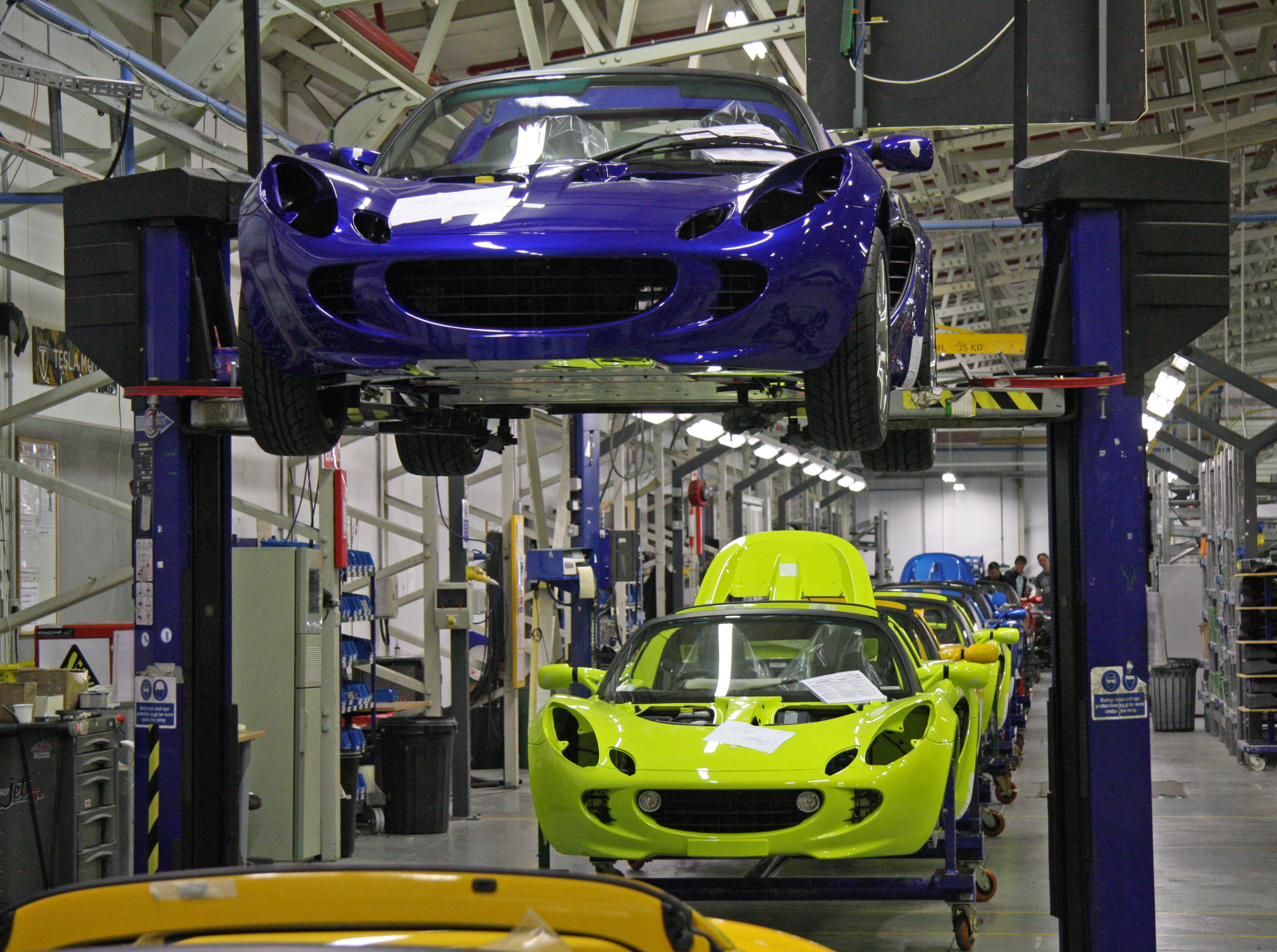
Interior of the Lotus Cars factory at the former Hethel Airfield.

In 1966, Lotus Cars moved into a purpose built factory on the site of the airfield and developed portions of the runways and taxiways as a test track for their cars. The factory and engineering centres cover 55 acres (22 ha) of the former airfield and use 2.5 miles (4.0 km) of runway. Much of the remaining runways have been removed and returned to agricultural use. The layout can still be seen from aerial photos.

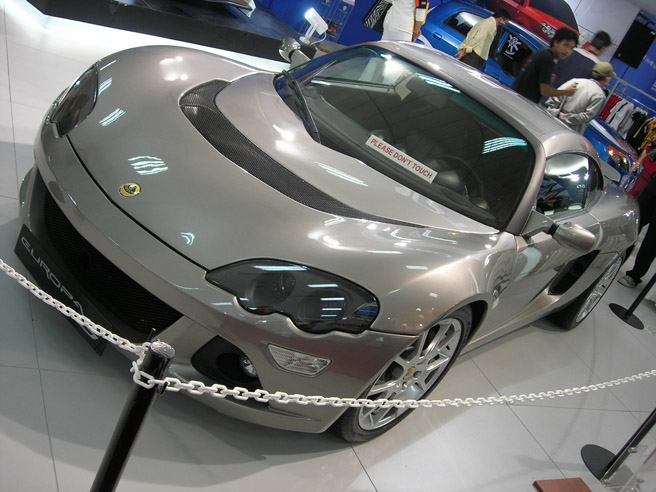
Lotus Europa at the Malaysian Motor Show 2010.

Lotus Cars designs and builds race and production automobiles of light weight and high handling characteristics. Colin Chapman, the founder of Lotus, died of a heart attack in 1982 at the age of 54, having begun life an innkeeper's son and become a multi-millionaire industrialist. The car maker built tens of thousands of successful racing and road cars and won the Formula One World Championship seven times. At the time of his death he was linked with the DeLorean Motor Company scandal over the use of government subsidies for the production of the Delorean for which Lotus had designed the chassis.

In 1986, the company was bought by General Motors. On 27 August 1993, GM sold the company, for £30 million, to A.C.B.N. Holdings S.A. of Luxembourg, a company controlled by Italian businessman Romano Artioli, who also owned Bugatti Automobili SpA. In 1996, a majority share in Lotus was sold to Perusahaan Otomobil Nasional Bhd (Proton), a Malaysian car company listed on the Kuala Lumpur Stock Exchange.

The company also acts as an engineering consultancy, providing engineering development—particularly of suspension—for other car manufacturers. The company's former racing arm, Team Lotus, and the Lotus Driving Academy were/are also based at Hethel.

== Governance ==
Hethel is part of the electoral ward of Bracon Ash & Hethel for local elections and is part of the district of South Norfolk.

The village's national constituency is South Norfolk which has been represented by the Labour's Ben Goldsborough MP since 2024.

== War Memorial ==
Hethel's war memorial is a wooden and brass plaque inside All Saints' Church which lists the following names for the First World War:

| Rank | Name | Unit | Date of death | Burial/Commemoration |
|---|---|---|---|---|
| Capt. | Frederic G. Bird DSO | Royal Navy | 29 Dec. 1919 | Chatham |
| Pte. | Frederick W. Gooch | 47th (British Columbia) Bn., CEF | 18 Oct. 1918 | Chapel Corner Cemetery |
| Pte. | Hugh R. Fulcher | 1st Bn., Coldstream Guards | 29 Oct. 1914 | Menin Gate |
| Pte. | Alfred Gooch | 5th Bn., Norfolk Regiment | 19 Apr. 1917 | Jerusalem Memorial |
