= Crownthorpe, Norfolk =

Coordinates: 52.5865°N 1.0731°E

Crownthorpe
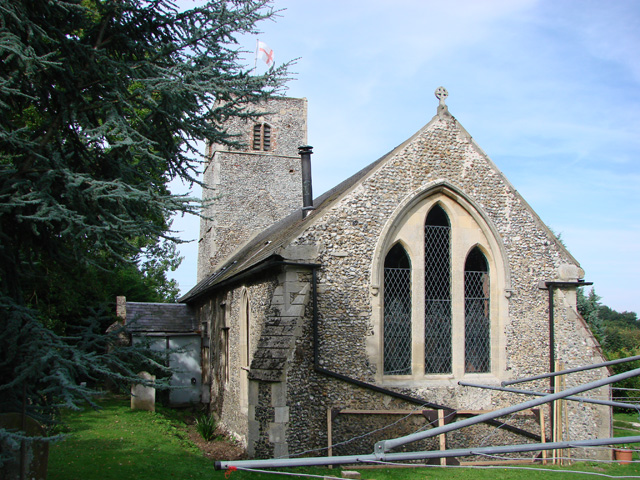
- St James' Church, now a provate house

- Location within Norfolk
- Civil parish: Wicklewood
- District: South Norfolk
- Shire county: Norfolk
- Region: East
- Country: England
- Sovereign state: United Kingdom
- Police: Norfolk
- Fire: Norfolk
- Ambulance: East of England

Crownthorpe is a village in the civil parish of Wicklewood, in the South Norfolk district, in the county of Norfolk, England. It is about 15 miles (24 km) miles from Norwich.

The parish church, St James Church became a Grade II* listed building on 15 August 1983 and is now a private house.

== History ==
The "thorpe" part of the name means 'Outlying farm/settlement', the 1st part is obscure. Crownthorpe was recorded in the Domesday Book as Congrethorp/Cronkethor. Crownthorpe was in the Forehoe hundred. In 1894 Crownthorpe became part of Forehoe Rural District, on 1 October 1935 the parish was abolished and merged with Wicklewood and became part of Forehoe and Henstead Rural District. At the 1931 census (the last before the abolition of the parish), Crownthorpe had a population of 62. In 1974 Crownthorpe became part of South Norfolk non-metropolitan district in the non-metropolitan county of Norfolk.
