= Tacolneston =

Village in Norfolk, England

Coordinates: 52.510278°N 1.155833°E

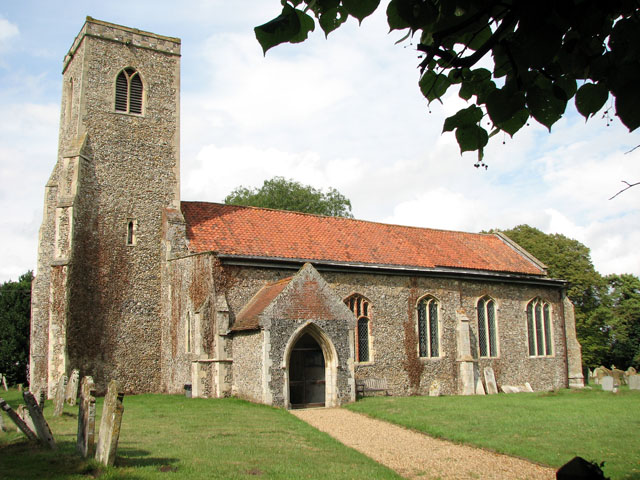
- The church of All Saints

- Location within Norfolk
- Area: 6.45 km^{2} (2.49 sq mi)
- Population: 825 (2011)
  - Density: 128/km^{2} (330/sq mi)
  - London: 87 miles (140 km) SW
- Civil parish: Tacolneston
- District: South Norfolk
- Shire county: Norfolk
- Region: East
- Country: England
- Sovereign state: United Kingdom
- Post town: NORWICH
- Postcode district: NR16
- Dialling code: 01508 (north part); 01953 (south part)
- Police: Norfolk
- Fire: Norfolk
- Ambulance: East of England
- UK Parliament: South Norfolk

Tacolneston (/ˈtækəlstən/) is a village and civil parish in the South Norfolk district of Norfolk with a population of around 700, measured at the 2011 census as a population of 825. Its name occurs in the 1086 Domesday Book as Tacoluestuna and is theorized to come from Anglo-Saxon Tātwulfes tūn, meaning "Tātwulf's farmstead", via an old handwriting misread 'n' for 'u'.

It is the location of the Tacolneston transmitting station, a facility for both analogue and digital VHF/FM radio and UHF television transmission.

Tacolneston Church of England Primary School, which has around 80 pupils aged 5–11, is situated on Norwich Road.

The village is the site of the historic All Saints' parish church, which has a ring of six bells in its tower, part of which dates from the 14th century.

== Correct pronunciation ==
"Tacolston"; "Tacklestone"; "Tacklestun"

== Notable residents ==
- Kenneth McKee, one of the pioneers of hip replacement surgery in the 1950s, and who is now honoured with a bust at the Norfolk and Norwich University Hospital
- The Boileau baronets, who have lived at Tacolneston Hall since the baronetcy was created in 1838.
