= St Michael's Church, Coston =

Coordinates: 52.6145°N 1.0447°E

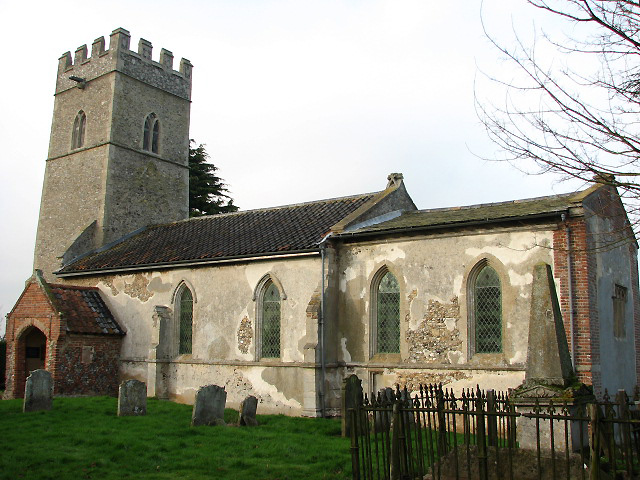
- St Michael's Church, Coston, from the southeast

- Location in Norfolk
- OS grid reference: TG 062 063
- Location: Coston, Norfolk
- Country: England
- Denomination: Anglican
- Website: Churches Conservation Trust

History
- Dedication: Saint Michael

Architecture
- Functional status: Redundant
- Heritage designation: Grade II*
- Designated: 15 August 1983
- Architectural type: Church
- Style: Early English
- Groundbreaking: 13th century

Specifications
- Materials: Flint; Roofs slated and tiled

St Michael's Church is a redundant Anglican church in the hamlet of Coston, in the civil parish of Runhall, Norfolk, England. It is recorded in the National Heritage List for England as a designated Grade II* listed building, and is under the care of the Churches Conservation Trust. The church stands in an isolated position.

== History ==
St Michael's dates mainly from the 13th century. A battlemented parapet was added to the tower in the 15th century, and the south porch was built in the 16th century. The east wall has been rebuilt, possibly in the late 18th century.

== Architecture ==
The church is constructed in flint with ashlar dressings. The roofs are slated or tiled. Parts of the walls are rendered. Its plan is simple, consisting of a nave without aisles, a chancel, a south porch, and a west tower. The church is in Early English style. The tower is in three stages with short angle buttresses. The two-light bell openings contain Y-tracery. At the summit is a battlemented parapet decorated with flushwork. There are two lancet windows in the north and south walls of the nave, and two similar windows in the north and south sides of the chancel. The east window has three lights and a flat head. The porch is in flint and brick, and contains some brick diapering.

Inside the church, the chancel arch is decorated with carved knots. The pulpit is in carved wood, and in the church are box pews. The font dates from the 15th century and is undecorated.

== See also ==
- List of churches preserved by the Churches Conservation Trust in the East of England
- Norfolk
- Cathedral
