= Tacolneston Hall =

Country house in Norfolk, England

Coordinates: 52.515418°N 1.14953°E

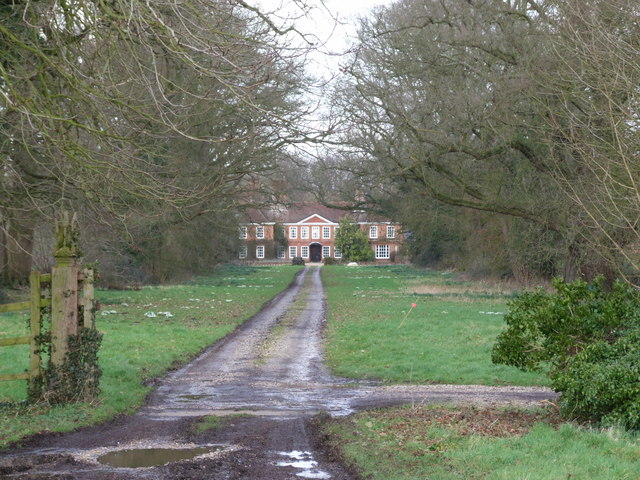

Tacolneston Hall, in the village of Tacolneston in the county of Norfolk, is a Queen Anne house, listed Grade II*. From the 1780's it was the home of the Boileau baronets, a baronetcy created in 1838.
