= Manor Farm, Pulham Market =

Farmhouse in Pulham Market, Norfolk, England

Coordinates: 52.4494°N 1.2523°E

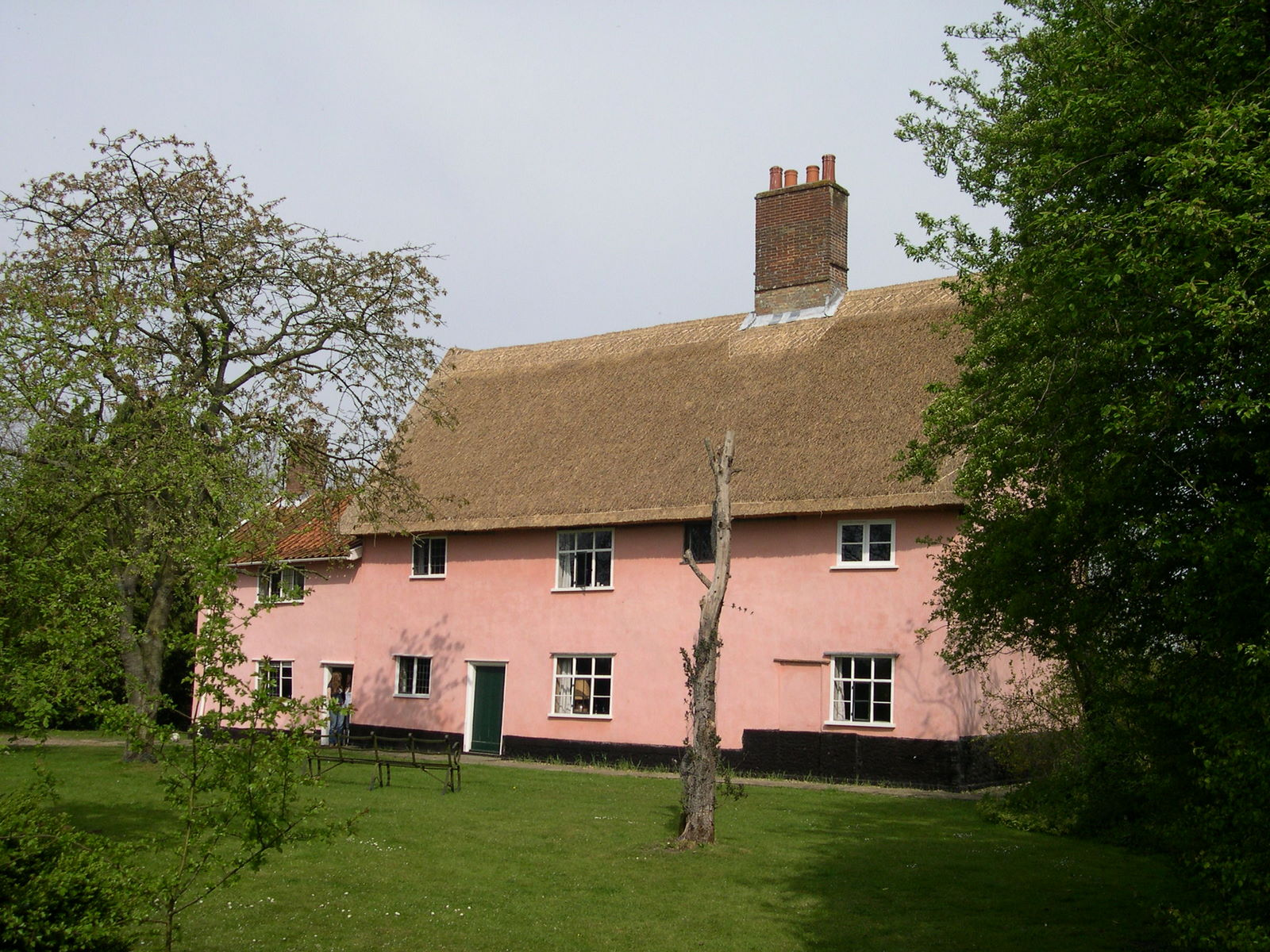
Manor Farm

Manor Farm, a property of the Landmark Trust, is at Pulham Market near the town of Diss, in Norfolk, England. The house is a Grade II listed building.

== History ==
The manor house was built sometime after 1597 by the Maltiward family, and this was determined via dendrochronology. In the early 18th century, it was used for farming and weaving, and unusually escaped the 16th century suppression of rural weaving by the Norfolk guilds.

The remains of a former moat around the property can be seen.

As of 2017, the house is in use as a rental property and it was named among Norfolk's best cottages in 2020.

== Restoration ==
Threatened by destruction in 1945, the house was bought by the Society for the Protection of Ancient Buildings and restored. It was bought by the Landmark Trust in 1979 and restored again, including a re-thatching of the roof in straw rather than reed.
