= Boileau baronets =

Baronetcy in the Baronetage of the United Kingdom

Escutcheon of the Boileau baronets of Tacolneston Hall

The Boileau baronetcy, of Tacolneston Hall in the County of Norfolk, is a title in the Baronetage of the United Kingdom. It was created on 24 July 1838 for John Boileau, antiquary, archaeologist, justice of the peace, and deputy lieutenant and high sheriff for Norfolk. His ancestor Charles Boileau, Baron of Castelnau and St Croix de Boriac, had fled to England after the revocation of the Edict of Nantes in 1685.

He was succeeded by his eldest surviving son, the second Baronet. He was a justice of the peace and Deputy Lieutenant for Norfolk and a Fellow of the Royal Society of Literature and the Society of Antiquaries. His eldest son, the third Baronet, was a justice of the peace and Deputy Lieutenant for Norfolk. He died unmarried and was succeeded by his younger brother, the fourth Baronet. He was a Lieutenant-Colonel in the Northamptonshire Regiment and the Royal Field Artillery and a justice of the peace and Deputy Lieutenant for Norfolk. He died childless and was succeeded by his first cousin, the fifth Baronet. He was the son of Edmund William Pollen Boileau, younger son of the first Baronet. His eldest son, the sixth Baronet, died without male issue and was succeeded by his younger brother, the seventh Baronet. From 1980 to 2013 the title was held by the latter's son, the eighth Baronet, Lieutenant Colonel Sir Guy Francis Boileau, who succeeded in 1980. He was a retired Lieutenant-Colonel in the Australian Army, and was educated at Xavier College, Melbourne. Sir Guy was married to Judith, Lady Boileau, a daughter of former Australian Senator, George Hannan. As of 2014 the title is held by Sir Guy's son, the ninth baronet.

== Boileau baronets, of Tacolneston Hall (1838) ==
- Sir John Peter Boileau, 1st Baronet (1794–1869)
- Sir Francis George Manningham Boileau, 2nd Baronet (1830–1900)
- Sir Maurice Colborne Boileau, 3rd Baronet (1865–1937)
- Sir Raymond Frederic Boileau, 4th Baronet (1868–1942)
- Sir Francis James Boileau, 5th Baronet (1871–1945)
- Sir Gilbert George Benson Boileau, 6th Baronet (1898–1978)
- Sir Edmond Charles Boileau, 7th Baronet (1903–1980)
- Lieutenant Colonel Sir Guy Francis Boileau, 8th Baronet (1935–2013)
- Sir Nicolas Edmond George Boileau, 9th Baronet (born 1964)

The heir presumptive is the present holder's brother Christopher Guy Boileau (born 1969).

== Notes ==
Baronetage of the United Kingdom
Preceded by Edwards baronets	Boileau baronets of Tacolneston Hall; 24 July 1838	Succeeded by Macpherson-Grant baronets
