= Thwaite St Mary =

Rural village in Norfolk, England

Coordinates: 52.5036°N 1.4367°E

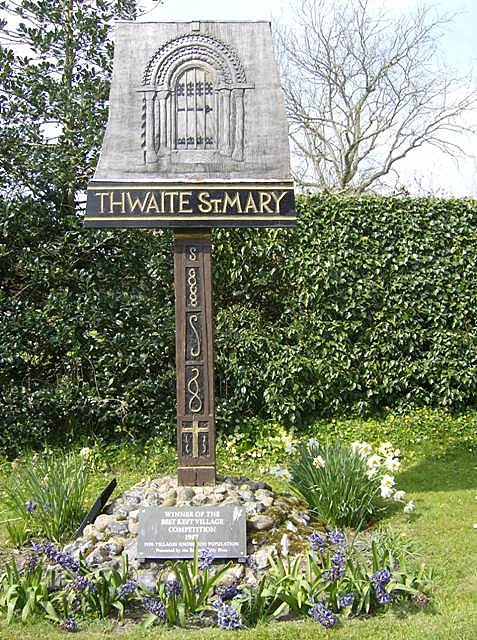
The village sign, showing the Norman arch in the photo below

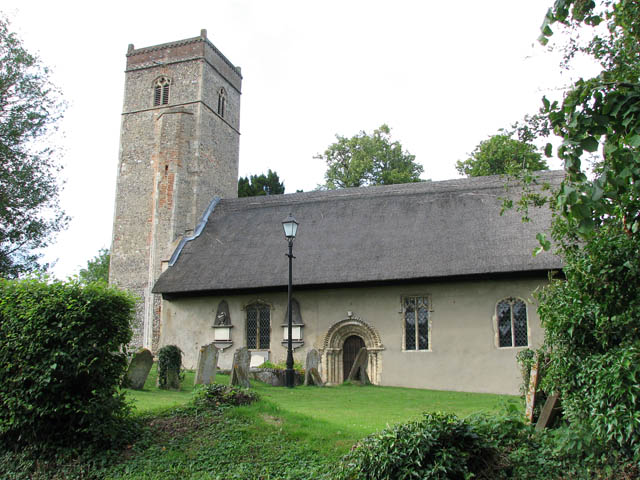
St Mary's Church

Thwaite St Mary is a rural village (and civil parish) in the English county of Norfolk, 12 miles (19 km) south of Norwich, and a few miles north of the Suffolk border.

Thwaite has an astronomical observatory run by the University of East Anglia. The thatched-roofed Anglican Church of St Mary is grade II* listed.

In the early part of the 21st century, the Second World War flying ace, Tom Neil, lived in the village.
