= Holverston =

Civil parish in Norfolk, England

Coordinates: 52.577°N 1.407°E

- Location within Norfolk
- Area: 1.44 km^{2} (0.56 sq mi)
- Population: 29
  - Density: 20/km^{2} (52/sq mi)
- OS grid reference: TG302026
- Civil parish: Holverston
- District: South Norfolk
- Shire county: Norfolk
- Region: East
- Country: England
- Sovereign state: United Kingdom
- Post town: NORWICH
- Postcode district: NR14
- Dialling code: 01508
- Police: Norfolk
- Fire: Norfolk
- Ambulance: East of England
- UK Parliament: South Norfolk

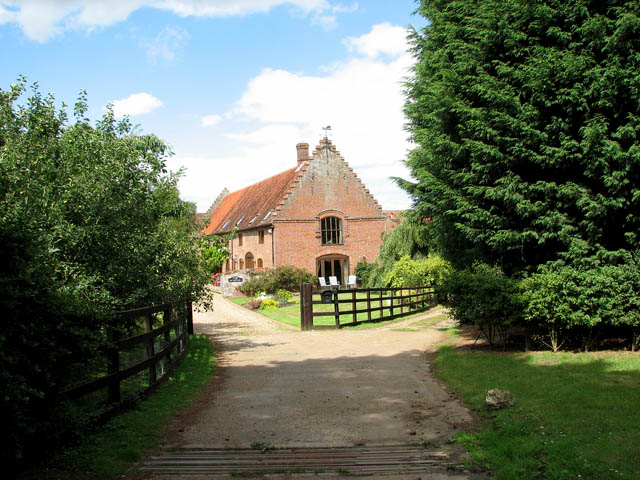
Holverston Hall

Holverston is a civil parish in the county of Norfolk, England ¾ mile (1¼ km) southeast of Rockland St. Mary. It includes the 16th century Holverston Hall (reached from the A146 between Framingham Pigot and Thurton) and associated barn conversions reached by road from Hellington to the east. In the 2001 census it contained 9 households and a population of 29. All traces of the thatched, round towered church (St. Mary) had disappeared by 1845.
