= Wreningham =

Village in Norfolk, England

Coordinates: 52.54385°N 1.19384°E

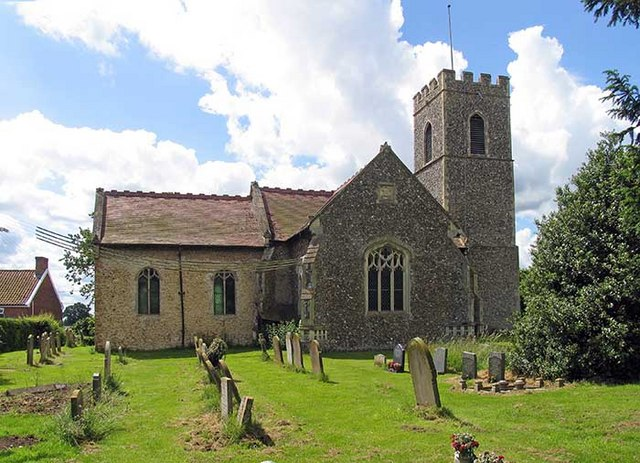
- All Saints, Wreningham

- Location within Norfolk
- Area: 6.24 km^{2} (2.41 sq mi)
- Population: 582 (2021)
  - Density: 93/km^{2} (240/sq mi)
- OS grid reference: TM166987
- Civil parish: Wreningham
- District: South Norfolk
- Shire county: Norfolk
- Region: East
- Country: England
- Sovereign state: United Kingdom
- Post town: NORWICH
- Postcode district: NR16
- Dialling code: 01508
- Police: Norfolk
- Fire: Norfolk
- Ambulance: East of England

Wreningham is a village and civil parish in the English county of Norfolk. It is situated some 3 miles (4.8 km) south east of Wymondham and 9 miles (14 km) south west of Norwich.

The civil parish has an area of 6.24 square kilometres and in 2001 had a population of 493 in 199 households, the population increasing to 528 at the 2011 Census and to 582 at the 2021 Census. For the purposes of local government, the parish falls within the district of South Norfolk.

From 1808 to 1814 Wreningham hosted a station in the shutter telegraph chain which connected the Admiralty in London to its naval ships in the port of Great Yarmouth.

== Superstitions ==
Wreningham, allegedly, got its name from the Witch and the Wren myth. The myth tells the story of a witch living in Wreningham who was discovered by the villagers. A knight then came to kill her and upon being attacked she transformed herself into a wren to escape safely; in response the villagers beat the bushes with sticks and caught and burnt any wrens that flew out in an attempt to kill her. She supposedly returns to the village every St Stephen's Day, and traditionally the villagers would beat the hedges and burn any wrens they caught on this day.
