= Coston, Norfolk =

Hamlet in Norfolk, England

Coordinates: 52°36′53″N 1°02′38″E

Coston
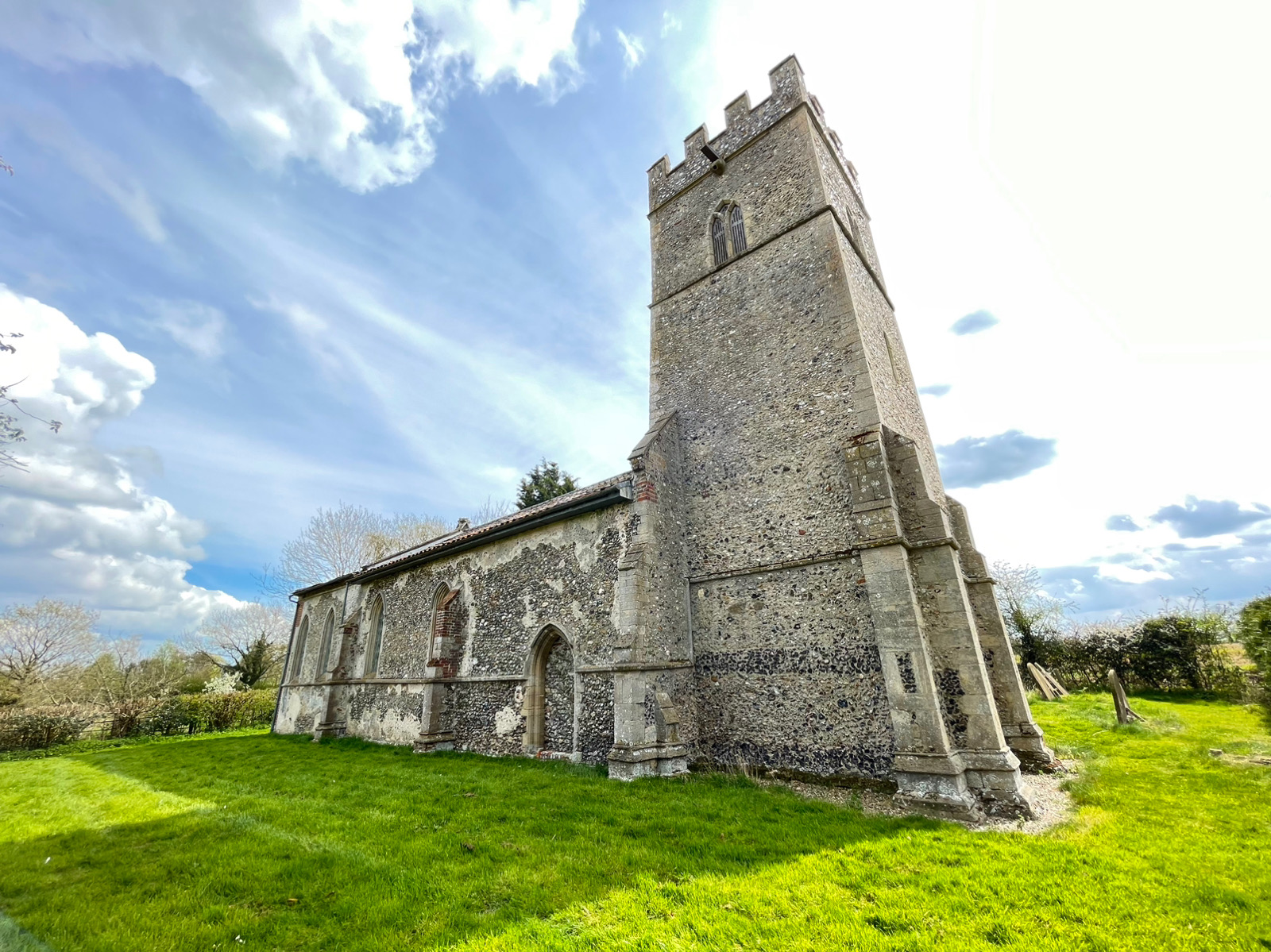
- St. Michael's Church

- Location within Norfolk
- Civil parish: Brandon Parva, Coston, Runhall and Welborne
- District: South Norfolk
- Shire county: Norfolk
- Region: East
- Country: England
- Sovereign state: United Kingdom
- Post town: NORWICH
- Postcode district: NR9
- Dialling code: 01603
- UK Parliament: Mid Norfolk

Coston is a village and former civil parish, now in the parish of Brandon Parva, Coston, Runhall and Welborne, in the South Norfolk district, in the English county of Norfolk.

Coston is located 4.2 miles (6.8 km) north-west of Wymondham and 10 miles (16 km) west of Norwich. The village is located on the course of the River Yare.

== History ==
Coston's name is of joint Anglo-Saxon and Viking origin and derives from an amalgamation from the Old English and Old Norse for Karr's farmstead or settlement.

Coston does not feature in the Domesday Book.

Two businesses that are accessible to the public operate in Coston. A booking only fishing venue (carp) at Coston Day Ticket Fishing Lake and the Coston Hall Dairy where raw milk can be purchased.

On 1 April 1935 the parish was abolished and merged with Runhall.

== Geography ==
The village is divided from nearby Runhall by the River Yare. In 1931 the parish had a population of 33, this was the last time separated population statistics for collated for Coston.

== St. Michael's Church ==
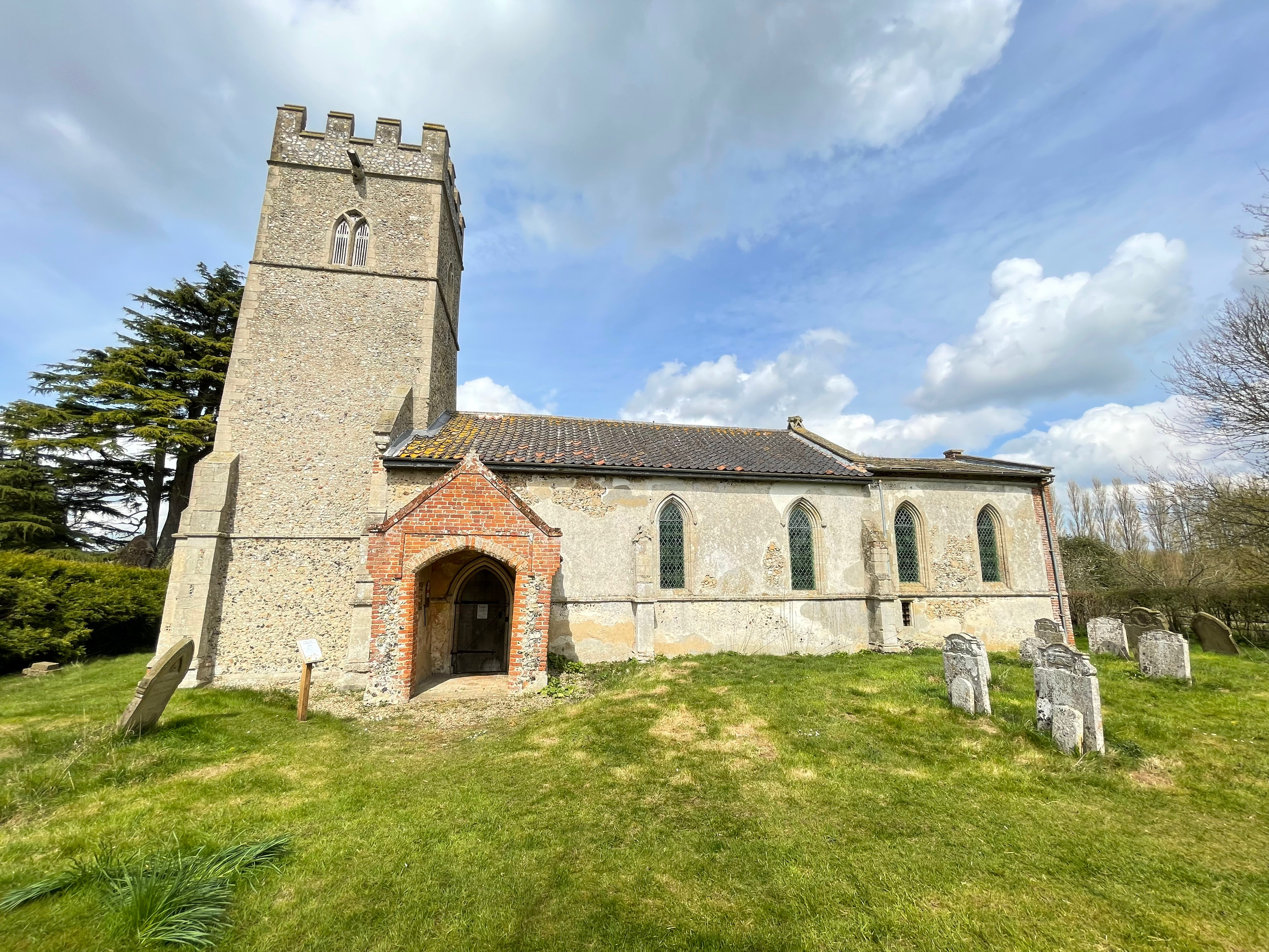
Newer front porch (c. 18th century) St Michael, hidden by the trees

Coston's parish church is dedicated to Saint Michael and dates from the Thirteenth Century. St. Michael's is located on Church Lane and has been Grade II listed since 1983.

St. Michael has been abandoned since the late-Eighteenth Century and is in the care of the Churches Conservation Trust, who have re-roofed and restored the church is recent years. The church holds a notable memorial to Charles Capp who was killed in an accident at Runhall Mill in 1883.

== Governance ==
Coston is part of the electoral ward of Wicklewood for local elections and is part of the district of South Norfolk.

The village's national constituency is Mid Norfolk which has been represented by the Conservative Party's George Freeman MP since 2010.

== War Memorial ==
Coston's war memorial is a brass plaque in the nave of St. Michael's Church. The memorial lists the following names for the First World War:

Rank	Name	Unit	Date of death	Burial
2Lt.	Frederick Abel	3rd Bn., Norfolk Regiment	30 Dec. 1917	Shatby War Cemetery
Pte.	Horace W. Balls	1/4th Bn., Norfolk Regt.	19 Apr. 1917	Gaza War Cemetery
Rfn.	Norman F. Wace	13th Bn., Rifle Brigade	4 Nov. 1918	Ghissignies Cemetery
