= Welborne =

Village in Norfolk, England

Coordinates: 52.647°N 01.048°E

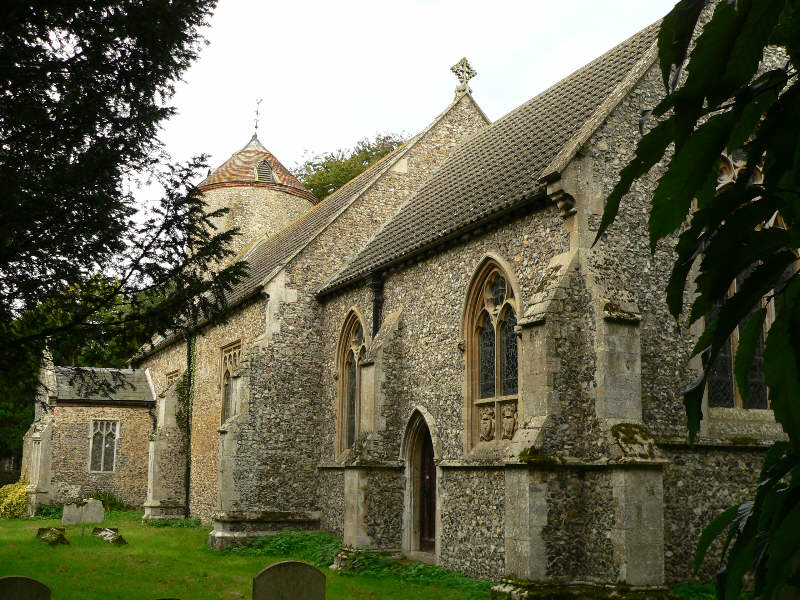
- Welborne All Saints

- Location within Norfolk
- Civil parish: Brandon Parva, Coston, Runhall and Welborne
- District: South Norfolk
- Shire county: Norfolk
- Region: East
- Country: England
- Sovereign state: United Kingdom

Welborne is a village and former civil parish, now in the parish of Brandon Parva, Coston, Runhall and Welborne, in the South Norfolk district, in the county of Norfolk, England. In 1931 the parish had a population of 147.

Its church, All Saints, is one of 124 existing round-tower churches in Norfolk.

== History ==
The villages name means 'spring stream'. On 1 April 1935, the parish was abolished and merged with Runhall.
