= Brandon Parva =

Village in Norfolk, England

Coordinates: 52.628°N 1.062°E

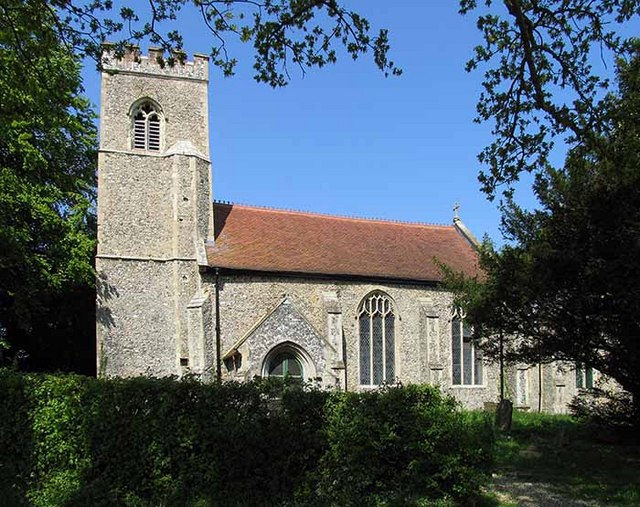
- The church of All Saints

- Location within Norfolk
- OS grid reference: TG073078
- Civil parish: Brandon Parva, Coston, Runhall and Welborne
- District: South Norfolk
- Shire county: Norfolk
- Region: East
- Country: England
- Sovereign state: United Kingdom
- Post town: Norwich
- Postcode district: NR9
- Dialling code: 01362
- UK Parliament: Mid Norfolk

Brandon Parva is a settlement in the civil parish of Brandon Parva, Coston, Runhall and Welborne, in the South Norfolk district, in the English county of Norfolk. It is 6.4 miles (10.3 km) south-east of Dereham and 9.5 miles (15.3 km) west of Norwich.

== History ==
In the Domesday Book, Brandon Parva is recorded as a settlement of five households in the hundred of Forehoe. In 1086, the village was part of the estates of Alan of Brittany.

On 1 April 1935 the parish was abolished and merged with Runhall. In 1931 the parish had a population of 111; in March 2011, the population is estimated to have been around 30.

== Church ==
The parish church, which is dedicated to All Saints, dates from the 15th century and is built in a perpendicular gothic style. The church was significantly restored in the 19th century, with stained-glass installed by Heaton, Butler and Bayne. The building is Grade II listed.
