= Homersfield Bridge =

Bridge in Norfolk, England

Coordinates: 52.4215°N 1.3566°E

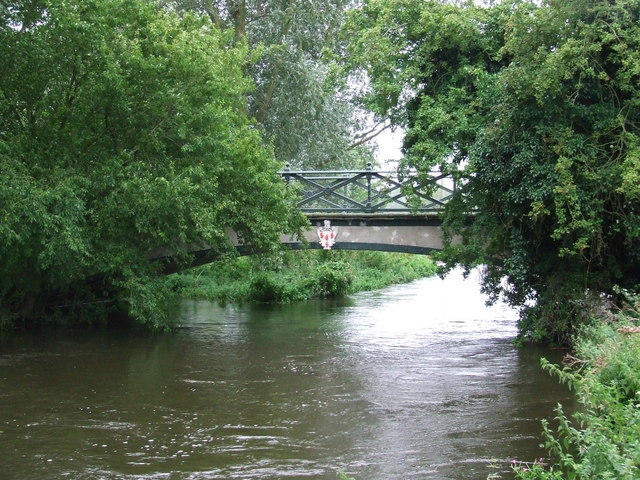
Homersfield Bridge

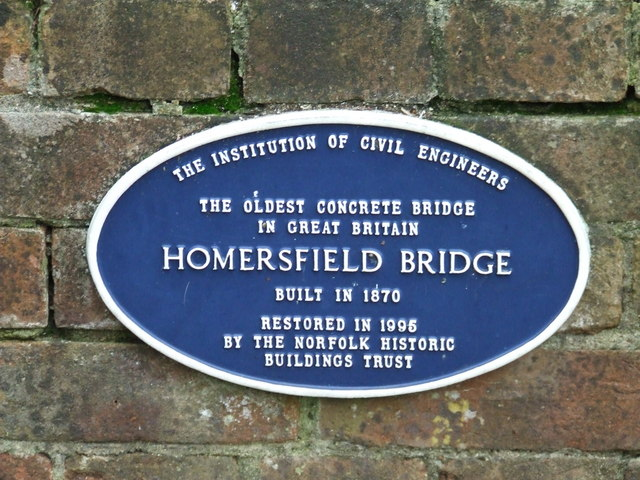
Blue plaque on bridge

Homersfield Bridge is a road bridge across the River Waveney between Norfolk and Suffolk, and stands partly in the civil parishes of Alburgh and Wortwell, Norfolk and partly in Homersfield, Suffolk. It is one of the oldest surviving concrete bridges in Britain and is a grade II* listed structure.

The bridge was designed by architect Henry Eyton and constructed in 1869 by Messrs W & T Phillips of London for Sir Shafto Adair, Bt of the Flixton Estate. It has a single 50 foot (15 metres) span consisting of a wrought iron frame encased in concrete, with cast iron balustrades decorated with Adair monograms. The pioneering composite construction of the bridge makes it an early example of a reinforced concrete structure. In the 1990s the bridge was restored by Norfolk Historic Building Trust and Suffolk Preservation Society after it had been compulsorily purchased by Norfolk County Council. Road traffic was diverted over a new bridge in 1970, and the old route over Homersfield Bridge is now a foot and cycle path.

A plaque on the bridge describes it as "The oldest concrete bridge in Great Britain".
