= Bracon Ash =

Village in Norfolk, England

Coordinates: 52.555°N 1.219°E

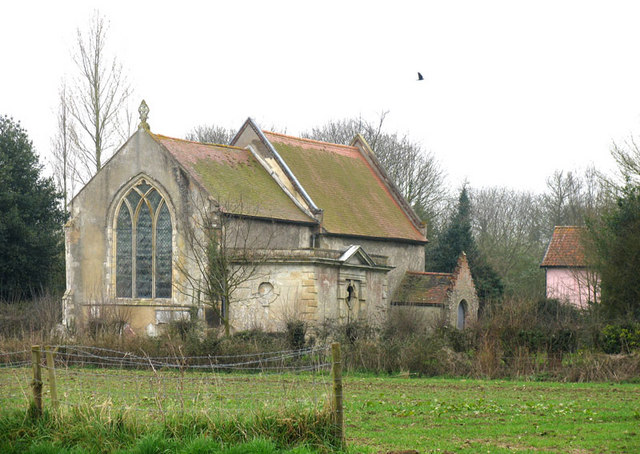
- St Nicholas, Bracon Ash

- Location within Norfolk
- Area: 9.84 km^{2} (3.80 sq mi)
- Population: 477 (2021)
  - Density: 48/km^{2} (120/sq mi)
- OS grid reference: TG182001
- Civil parish: Bracon Ash
- District: South Norfolk
- Shire county: Norfolk
- Region: East
- Country: England
- Sovereign state: United Kingdom
- Post town: NORWICH
- Postcode district: NR14
- Dialling code: 01508
- Police: Norfolk
- Fire: Norfolk
- Ambulance: East of England
- UK Parliament: South Norfolk

Bracon Ash is a village and civil parish in the South Norfolk district of the English county of Norfolk. It is 4.4 miles (7.1 km) south-east of Wymondham and 5.8 miles (9.3 km) south-west of Norwich.

== History ==
Bracon Ash's name is of Anglo-Saxon origin. In the Domesday Book, Bracon Ash is recorded as a settlement of 15 households in the hundred of Humbleyard. In 1086, the village was part of the estates of Roger Bigod.

== Geography ==
England's smallest official nature reserve, Hethel Thorn, is to the west of the village. Bracon Ash Common is a small area of woodland and ponds running adjacent to Mergate Lane.

According to the 2021 census, Bracon Ash Parish has a population of 477 people, which has increased slightly from the 460 people listed in the 2011 census. Amenities within the village include a children's play-park. The village sign

== Church ==
The parish church is dedicated to Saint Nicholas and dates from the 14th-century, with significant rebuilding and restoration in the 19th-centyrt. Within the churchyard is an 18th-century mausoleum, dedicated to the Berney family. St. Nicholas' has been Grade I listed since 1959.

== Governance ==
Bracon Ash is part of the electoral ward of Mulbarton & Stoke Holy Cross for local elections and is part of the district of South Norfolk. It is part of the South Norfolk parliamentary constituency.
