= South Norfolk =

Coordinates: 52.4920°N 1.2312°E

South Norfolk District
- Non-metropolitan district
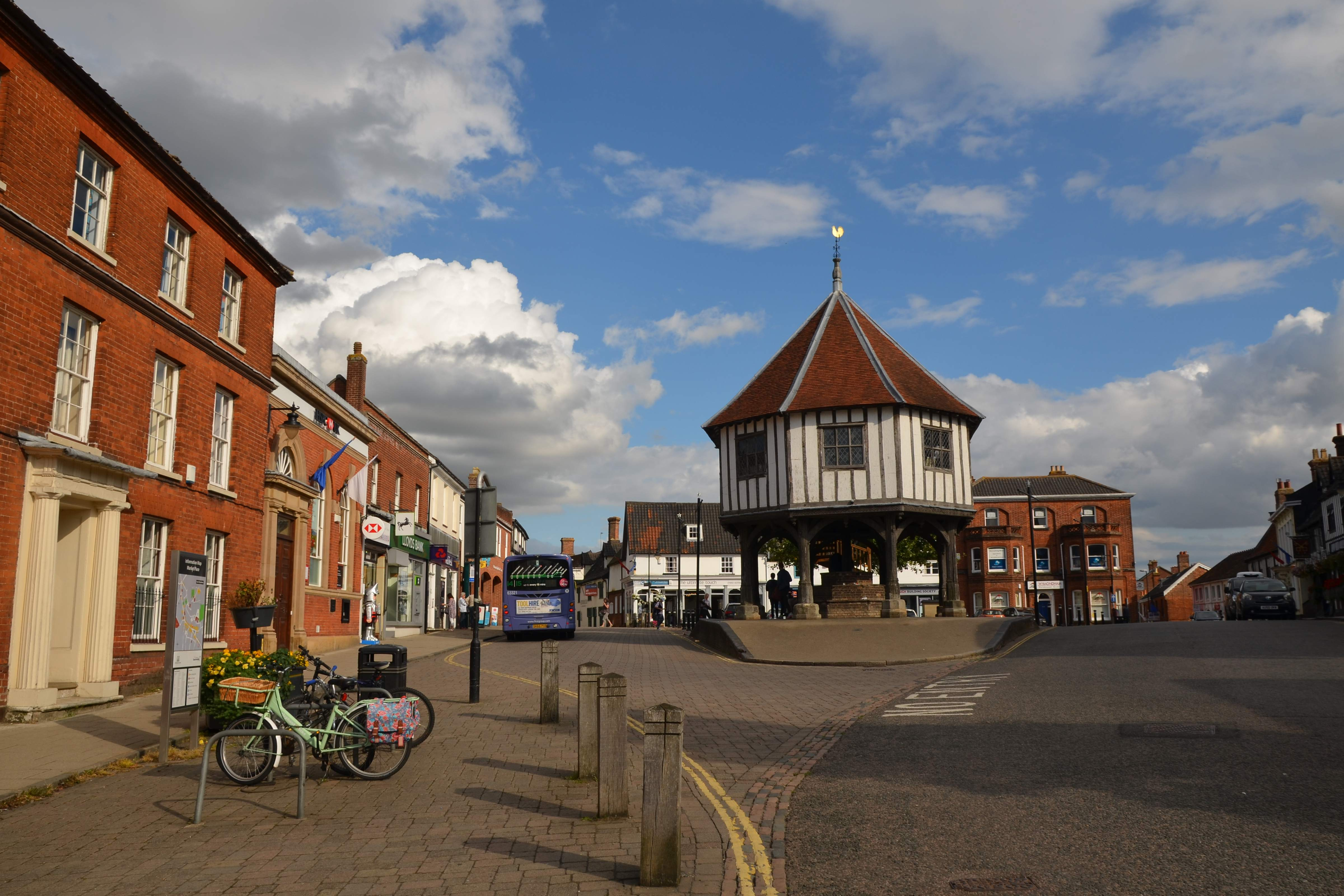
- Market Place in Wymondham, the district's largest town.

- Shown within Norfolk
- Sovereign state: United Kingdom
- Constituent country: England
- Region: East of England
- Administrative county: Norfolk
- Formed: 1 April 1974
- Admin. HQ: Broadland Business Park near Norwich

Government
  - Type: South Norfolk District Council
  - MPs: Ben Goldsborough (L), George Freeman (C), Clive Lewis (L), Adrian Ramsay (G)

Area
  - Total: 351 sq mi (908 km^{2})
  - Rank: 33rd

Population (2025)
  - Total: 150,396
  - Rank: Ranked 153rd
  - Density: 429/sq mi (166/km^{2})

Ethnicity (2021)
  - Ethnic groups: List: 95.4% White; 1.8% Asian; 1.5% Mixed; 0.8% Black; 0.5% other

Religion (2021)
  - Religion: List: 50.6% Christianity; 47.3% no religion; 1.5% other; 0.6% Islam
- Time zone: UTC+0 (Greenwich Mean Time)
  - Summer (DST): UTC+1 (British Summer Time)
- ONS code: 33UH (ONS); E07000149 (GSS)

South Norfolk is a local government district in Norfolk, England. The largest town is Wymondham, and the district also includes the towns of Costessey, Diss, Harleston, Hingham, Loddon and Long Stratton. The council was based in Long Stratton until 2023 when it moved to the Broadland Business Park near Norwich, in the neighbouring Broadland district, as part of a shared facility with Broadland District Council. Some of the district's urban areas (including Costessey) form part of the Norwich built-up area. The district also includes numerous villages and surrounding rural areas. Some eastern parts of the district lie within The Broads.

The neighbouring districts are Breckland, Broadland, Norwich, Great Yarmouth, East Suffolk and Mid Suffolk.

== History ==
The district was created on 1 April 1974 under the Local Government Act 1972, covering five former districts, which were all abolished at the same time:

- Depwade Rural District
- Diss Urban District
- Forehoe and Henstead Rural District
- Loddon Rural District
- Wymondham Urban District

The new district was named South Norfolk, reflecting its position within the wider county.

The council appointed a shared managing director with neighbouring Broadland District Council in 2018. The two councils' staff were merged in 2020 and the councils moved to a new shared building in 2023.

In March 2026, the government announced plans to abolish the district in 2028 as part of local government reorganisation across Norfolk. These proposals were withdrawn in September 2026.

== Governance ==
South Norfolk Council

Type
- Type: Non-metropolitan district

Leadership
- Chair: Kathryn Cross, Conservative since 18 May 2026
- Leader: Daniel Elmer, Conservative since 20 May 2024
- Managing Director: Trevor Holden since 2019

Structure
- Seats: 46 councillors
- Political groups: Administration (23) Conservative (23) Other parties (23) Labour (9) Liberal Democrats (9) Green (1) Independent (4)

Elections
- Last election: 4 May 2023

Meeting place
- The Horizon Centre, Broadland Business Park, Peachman Way, Norwich, NR7 0WF

Website
- www.southnorfolkandbroadland.gov.uk

South Norfolk Council provides district-level services. County-level services are provided by Norfolk County Council. The whole district is also covered by civil parishes, which form a third tier of local government.

In the parts of the district within The Broads, town planning is the responsibility of the Broads Authority. The district council appoints one of its councillors to sit on that authority.

=== Political control ===
The council has been under no overall control since a by-election in May 2024. Prior to that, the council had been under Conservative majority control since 2007. The Conservatives continue to run the council, but as a minority administration.

The first election to the council was held in 1973, initially operating as a shadow authority alongside the outgoing authorities until the new arrangements took effect on 1 April 1974. Political control of the council since 1974 has been as follows:

Party in control	Years
Independent	1974–1976
No overall control	1976–1979
Conservative	1979–1987
No overall control	1987–1995
Liberal Democrats	1995–2007
Conservative	2007–2024
No overall control	2024–present

=== Leadership ===
The leaders of the council since 2003 have been:

Councillor	Party	From	To
Richard Carden	Liberal Democrats	2003	May 2006
Vivienne Clifford-Jackson	Liberal Democrats	2006	May 2007
John Fuller (Note: Ennobled in March 2024 as Baron Fuller of Gorleston-on-Sea in the County of Norfolk; he resigned as leader shortly afterwards.)	Conservative	May 2007	20 May 2024
Daniel Elmer	Conservative	20 May 2024	

=== Composition ===
Following the 2023 election, and subsequent by-elections and changes of allegiance up to July 2026, the composition of the council was:

Party	Councillors
Conservative	23
Labour	9
Liberal Democrats	9
Green	1
Independent	4
Total	46

Two of the independent councillors sit together as the "South Norfolk Independents" group.

=== Elections ===
Since the last full review of boundaries in 2019 the council has comprised 46 councillors representing 26 wards with each ward electing one, two or three councillors. Elections are held every four years.

UK Youth Parliament

Although the UK Youth Parliament is an apolitical organisation, the elections are run in a similar way to the local elections. The votes come from 11 to 18 year olds and are combined to make the decision of the next, 2 year Member of Youth Parliament. The elections are run at different times across the country; South Norfolk's are typically in early Spring and bi-annually.

=== Premises ===
In 2023 the council moved to the Horizon Centre, a modern office building at the Broadland Business Park on the outskirts of Norwich (in the parish of Postwick with Witton). The council shares the building with Broadland District Council as part of their joint management and staff arrangement.

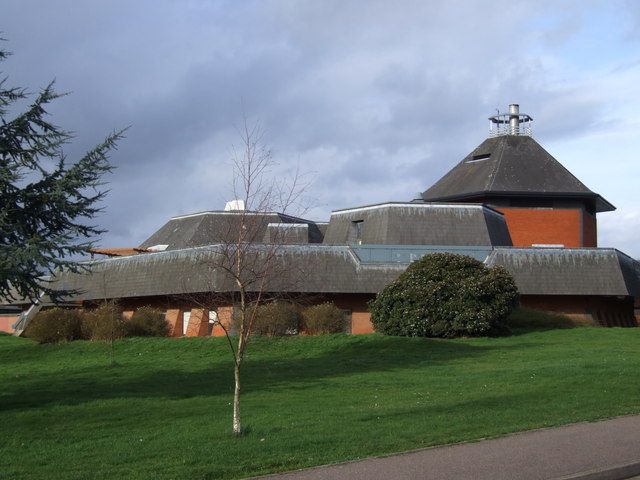
South Norfolk House, Long Stratton: Council's headquarters 1979–2023.

Prior to 2023 the council was based at South Norfolk House at Cygnet Court in Long Stratton, which had been purpose-built for the council and was formally opened on 26 September 1979.

== Geography ==
South Norfolk population pyramid

At the time of the 2001 census, the district had an area of 909 km², with a population of 110,710 in 46,607 households.

== Towns and parishes ==
The district made up of 119 civil parishes. The parish councils for Costessey, Diss, Hingham, Loddon, Long Stratton, Redenhall with Harleston, and Wymondham have declared their parishes to be towns, allowing them to take the style "town council".

- Alburgh, Aldeby, Alpington, Ashby St. Mary, Ashwellthorpe and Fundenhall, Aslacton
- Barford, Barnham Broom, Bawburgh, Bedingham, Bergh Apton, Bixley, Bracon Ash, Bramerton, Brandon Parva, Coston, Runhall and Welborne, Bressingham, Brockdish, Brooke, Broome, Bunwell, Burgh St. Peter, Burston and Shimpling
- Caistor St. Edmund, Carleton Rode, Carleton St. Peter, Chedgrave, Claxton, Colney, Costessey, Cringleford
- Denton, Deopham, Dickleburgh and Rushall, Diss, Ditchingham
- Earsham, East Carleton, Easton, Ellingham
- Flordon, Forncett (comprising Forncett St Mary and Forncett St Peter), Framingham Earl, Framingham Pigot
- Geldeston, Gillingham, Gissing, Great Melton, Great Moulton
- Haddiscoe, Hales, Heckingham, Hedenham, Hellington, Hempnall, Hethersett, Heywood, Hingham, Holverston, Howe
- Keswick and Intwood, Ketteringham, Kimberley, Kirby Bedon, Kirby Cane, Kirstead
- Langley with Hardley, Little Melton, Loddon, Long Stratton
- Marlingford and Colton,
- Morley, Morningthorpe and Fritton, Mulbarton, Mundham
- Needham, Newton Flotman, Norton Subcourse
- Poringland, Pulham Market, Pulham St. Mary
- Raveningham, Redenhall with Harleston, Rockland St. Mary, Roydon
- Saxlingham Nethergate, Scole, Seething, Shelfanger, Shelton and Hardwick, Shotesham, Sisland, Starston, Stockton, Stoke Holy Cross, Surlingham, Swainsthorpe, Swardeston
- Tacolneston, Tasburgh, Tharston and Hapton, Thurlton, Thurton, Thwaite, Tibenham, Tivetshall St Margaret, Tivetshall St. Mary, Toft Monks, Topcroft, Trowse with Newton,
- Wacton, Wheatacre, Wicklewood, Winfarthing, Woodton, Wortwell, Wramplingham, Wreningham, Wymondham
- Yelverton

== Merger ==
In October 2020, Private Eye reported a total of £594,000 was paid to two managers leaving South Norfolk council as a result of the merger of the management teams at South Norfolk and Broadland councils, which included £540,000 to outgoing chief executive Sandra Dinneen. (A further £357,000 in termination payments was to be shared between three managers leaving Broadland council due to the merger.) The councils stated these so-called "golden goodbyes" would save them money, as they would have fewer highly paid senior officials after they departed.

In early 2023, South Norfolk District Council and Broadland District Council moved into a joint headquarters in the Broadland Business Park near Norwich. As a result of this move, South Norfolk District Council's headquarters no longer sits within the district. However, proponents of the move defend the decision, stating that due to the population density of the district being heavily weighted towards the greater Norwich suburbs, the new headquarters is more accessible to the majority of the district's residents than the previous headquarters in Long Stratton.

== Arms ==
Coat of arms of South Norfolk

Notes
Granted 23 July 1979.
Crest
On a wreath of the colours a demi-boar Ermine langued Gules between two wings addorsed Argent resting the sinister hoof upon a hexagon Or enclosing a mullet Azure.
Escutcheon
Per chevron lozengy Argent and Vert and barry wavy of six Azure and Argent in chief two garbs and in the fess point a hexagon [voided] Or.
Motto
Service Without Prejudice
