= Listed buildings in North Norfolk District =

Listed buildings in Norfolk, England

There are around 2,400 listed buildings in the North Norfolk district, which are buildings of architectural or historic interest.

- Grade I buildings are of exceptional interest.
- Grade II* buildings are particularly important buildings of more than special interest.
- Grade II buildings are of special interest.

The lists follow Historic England’s geographical organisation, with entries grouped by county, local authority, and parish (civil and non-civil). The following lists are arranged by parish.

Parish	List of listed buildings	Grade I	Grade II*	Grade II	Total
Alby with Thwaite	Listed buildings in Alby with Thwaite				
Aldborough	Listed buildings in Aldborough, Norfolk				
Antingham	Listed buildings in Antingham				
Ashmanhaugh	Listed buildings in Ashmanhaugh				
Aylmerton	Listed buildings in Aylmerton				
Baconsthorpe	Listed buildings in Baconsthorpe				
Bacton	Listed buildings in Bacton, Norfolk				
Barsham	Listed buildings in Barsham, Norfolk				
Barton Turf	Listed buildings in Barton Turf				
Beeston Regis	Listed buildings in Beeston Regis				
Binham	Listed buildings in Binham				
Blakeney	Listed buildings in Blakeney, Norfolk				
Bodham	Listed buildings in Bodham				
Briningham	Listed buildings in Briningham				
Brinton	Listed buildings in Brinton, Norfolk				
Briston	Listed buildings in Briston				
Brumstead	Listed buildings in Brumstead				
Catfield	Listed buildings in Catfield				
Cley-Next-The-Sea	Listed buildings in Cley next the Sea				
Colby	Listed buildings in Colby, Norfolk				
Corpusty	Listed buildings in Corpusty				
Cromer	Listed buildings in Cromer				
Dilham	Listed buildings in Dilham				
Dunton	Listed buildings in Dunton, Norfolk				
East Beckham	Listed buildings in East Beckham				
East Ruston	Listed buildings in East Ruston				
Edgefield	Listed buildings in Edgefield, Norfolk				
Erpingham	Listed buildings in Erpingham				
Fakenham	Listed buildings in Fakenham				
Felbrigg	Listed buildings in Felbrigg				
Felmingham	Listed buildings in Felmingham				
Field Dalling	Listed buildings in Field Dalling				
Fulmodeston	Listed buildings in Fulmodeston				
Gimingham	Listed buildings in Gimingham				
Great Snoring	Listed buildings in Great Snoring				
Gresham	Listed buildings in Gresham, Norfolk				
Guestwick	Listed buildings in Guestwick				
Gunthorpe	Listed buildings in Gunthorpe, Norfolk				
Hanworth	Listed buildings in Hanworth, Norfolk				
Happisburgh	Listed buildings in Happisburgh				
Helhoughton	Listed buildings in Helhoughton				
Hempstead	Listed buildings in Hempstead, near Holt, Norfolk				
Hempton	Listed buildings in Hempton				
Hickling	Listed buildings in Hickling, Norfolk				
High Kelling	Listed buildings in High Kelling				
Hindolveston	Listed buildings in Hindolveston				
Hindringham	Listed buildings in Hindringham				
Holkham	Listed buildings in Holkham				
Holt	Listed buildings in Holt, Norfolk				
Honing	Listed buildings in Honing, Norfolk				
Horning	Listed buildings in Horning				
Horsey	Listed buildings in Horsey, Norfolk				
Hoveton	Listed buildings in Hoveton				
Ingham	Listed buildings in Ingham, Norfolk				
Ingworth	Listed buildings in Ingworth				
Itteringham	Listed buildings in Itteringham				
Kelling	Listed buildings in Kelling				
Kettlestone	Listed buildings in Kettlestone				
Knapton	Listed buildings in Knapton				
Langham	Listed buildings in Langham, Norfolk				
Lessingham	Listed buildings in Lessingham				
Letheringsett with Glandford	Listed buildings in Letheringsett with Glandford				
Little Barningham	Listed buildings in Little Barningham				
Little Snoring	Listed buildings in Little Snoring				
Ludham	Listed buildings in Ludham				
Matlaske	Listed buildings in Matlaske				
Melton Constable	Listed buildings in Melton Constable				
Morston	Listed buildings in Morston				
Mundesley	Listed buildings in Mundesley				
Neatishead	Listed buildings in Neatishead				
Northrepps	Listed buildings in Northrepps				
North Walsham	Listed buildings in North Walsham				
Overstrand	Listed buildings in Overstrand				
Paston	Listed buildings in Paston, Norfolk				
Plumstead	Listed buildings in Plumstead, Norfolk				
Potter Heigham	Listed buildings in Potter Heigham				
Pudding Norton	Listed buildings in Pudding Norton				
Raynham	Listed buildings in Raynham, Norfolk				
Roughton	Listed buildings in Roughton, Norfolk				
Runton	Listed buildings in Runton				
Ryburgh	Listed buildings in Ryburgh				
Salthouse	Listed buildings in Salthouse				
Scottow	Listed buildings in Scottow				
Sculthorpe	Listed buildings in Sculthorpe, Norfolk				
Sea Palling	Listed buildings in Sea Palling				
Sharrington	Listed buildings in Sharrington				
Sheringham	Listed buildings in Sheringham				
Sidestrand	Listed buildings in Sidestrand				
Skeyton	Listed buildings in Skeyton				
Sloley	Listed buildings in Sloley				
Smallburgh	Listed buildings in Smallburgh				
Southrepps	Listed buildings in Southrepps				
Stalham	Listed buildings in Stalham				
Stibbard	Listed buildings in Stibbard				
Stiffkey	Listed buildings in Stiffkey				
Stody	Listed buildings in Stody				
Suffield	Listed buildings in Suffield, Norfolk				
Sustead	Listed buildings in Sustead				
Sutton	Listed buildings in Sutton, Norfolk				
Swafield	Listed buildings in Swafield				
Swanton Abbott	Listed buildings in Swanton Abbott				
Swanton Novers	Listed buildings in Swanton Novers				
Tatterford	Listed buildings in Tatterford				
Tattersett	Listed buildings in Tattersett				
Testerton	Listed buildings in Testerton				
Thornage	Listed buildings in Thornage				
Thorpe Market	Listed buildings in Thorpe Market				
Thurgarton	Listed buildings in Thurgarton (Norfolk)				
Thurning	Listed buildings in Thurning, Norfolk				
Thursford	Listed buildings in Thursford				
Trimingham	Listed buildings in Trimingham				
Trunch	Listed buildings in Trunch				
Tunstead	Listed buildings in Tunstead, Norfolk				
Upper Sheringham	Listed buildings in Upper Sheringham				
Walsingham	Listed buildings in Walsingham				
Warham	Listed buildings in Warham, Norfolk				
Wells-next-the-Sea	Listed buildings in Wells-next-the-Sea				
West Beckham	Listed buildings in West Beckham				
Westwick	Listed buildings in Westwick, Norfolk				
Weybourne	Listed buildings in Weybourne, Norfolk				
Wickmere	Listed buildings in Wickmere				
Wighton	Listed buildings in Wighton				
Witton	Listed buildings in Witton, North Norfolk				
Wiveton	Listed buildings in Wiveton				
Wood Norton	Listed buildings in Wood Norton, Norfolk				
Worstead	Listed buildings in Worstead				

== See also ==
- Grade I listed buildings in Norfolk
- Grade II* listed buildings in Norfolk

== Sources ==
- Wilson, Bill; Pevsner, Nikolaus (1997) [1962], Norfolk 1: Norwich and North-East, The Buildings of England, New Haven and London: Yale University Press, ISBN 978-0-300-09607-1
