= John Pycraft =

British murderer (executed 1819)

- Died: 16 August 1819; Norwich Castle
- Cause of death: Execution
- Occupation: Gardener
- Criminal charges: Murder
- Criminal penalty: Execution and dissection

John Pycraft (born 1783 or 1784, executed 16 August 1819) was a British gardener and murderer from Westwick, Norfolk in England. He was convicted of the murder of his child with poisoned tea, though it was reported that he had intended to instead poison his wife. Pycraft was sentenced to death at the Norfolk Assizes and executed at Norwich Castle. He was subsequently dissected, a punishment likely motivated by medical interest in his dwarfism. His skeleton was kept by the Norfolk and Norwich Hospital Museum.

Pycraft was a gardener from Westwick, Norfolk. He had a form of dwarfism, at his death standing at 4 feet 2 inches (1.27 m) in height, with legs of 8 inches (20 cm) and arms of 13.5 inches (34 cm).

He committed murder by poisoning his child with poisoned tea; this poison was in fact intended for his wife. At the Norfolk Assizes, he was initially acquitted of the murder on 14 August 1819 according to the Norfolk Chronicle, though days later the court took up his case a second time, convicting him. He was condemned to death for the murder. On Monday 16 August 1819, at 35 years of age, Pycraft was executed at Norwich Castle. He was then sent for dissection, a decision possibly motivated by medical interest in his dwarfism.

A broadside ballad, The Trial and Execution of John Pycraft, was printed in 1819 by Robert Lane, based in Bridewell Alley which would have been just north of the scaffold on which the execution took place. It consists of an account of his crime and execution in prose as well as a set of poetic stanzas. The Bury and Norwich Post covered Pycraft's crime and execution, noting that he tried to kill his wife "in order that he might more easily continue his connexion with a dissolute woman", over around 16 lines of text. It additionally detailed Pycraft's height, the length of his arms and legs, and his skull circumference. The Norfolk Chronicle by contrast dedicated 105 lines to its coverage of the execution as well as Pycraft's dissection, analysing Pycraft's physical differences and concluding that they were "in singular unison with his moral depravity".

The Norfolk and Norwich Hospital Museum kept his skeleton, cataloguing it under his name.
