= Worstead =

Village in Norfolk, England

Coordinates: 52.783°N 1.413°E

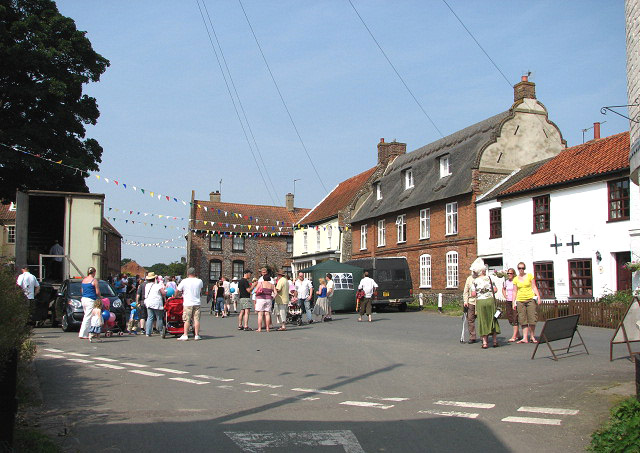
- Festival day on the Church Plain

- Location within Norfolk
- Area: 10.65 km^{2} (4.11 sq mi)
- Population: 922 (2011)
  - Density: 87/km^{2} (230/sq mi)
- OS grid reference: TG3026
- District: North Norfolk
- Shire county: Norfolk
- Region: East
- Country: England
- Sovereign state: United Kingdom
- Post town: NORTH WALSHAM
- Postcode district: NR28
- Dialling code: 01692
- Police: Norfolk
- Fire: Norfolk
- Ambulance: East of England
- UK Parliament: North Norfolk

Worstead /ˈwʊstɪd/ is a village and civil parish in the North Norfolk district of Norfolk, England.

In the 2001 census the parish had a population of 862 in 365 households; the population increased to 922 at the 2011 census.

== History ==
The village's name means "enclosure place".

In Domesday Book of 1086 Worstead is called Wrdesteda and Ordested. King Canute gave the village to the abbots of St Benet's Abbey on the River Bure in the Norfolk Broads. At the time of Domesday Book the village had two churches, one of which is believed to have been St Andrew's Church, of which no remains exist.

The village became prosperous from the twelfth century when weavers from Flanders arrived in the area. They had been encouraged to settle in Norfolk by King Edward III of England. Worsted cloth derives its name from this weaving heritage, although it is no longer manufactured in the village and the last weaver, John Cubitt, died in 1882 at the age of 91. The oldest act of parliament kept in the House of Lords Record Office is the Taking of Apprentices for Worsteads in the County of Norfolk Act of 1497. Weaving and spinning demonstrations are part of the annual Worstead Festival on the last weekend in July.

== Geography ==
The village is 3 miles (5 km) south of North Walsham, 5 miles (8 km) north of Wroxham, and 13 miles (21 km) north of Norwich, and is covered by a conservation area. The civil parish has an area of 10.65 km^{2}. The parish includes the hamlets of Bengate, Briggate, Lyngate, and Meeting Hill at the north-east, and Withergate just to the north of the village. Another settlement is along Station Road in the south-west of the parish, with houses, and a food factory which since 2015 has been operated by potato supplier Albert Bartlett. The North Walsham and Dilham Canal runs along the north-east parish boundary at Briggate. Worstead Windmill was built in the 1850s and worked by wind until 1902. It has been converted to residential use.

== Governance ==
Worstead parish council consists of nine members, and meets at the Village Hall.

Worstead electoral ward elects a councillor to North Norfolk District Council. Before boundary changes in 2019, the ward stretched north to Suffield. The pre-2019 ward had a population of 2,384 in 2011. Since 2019 the ward has consisted of the parishes of Worstead, Westwick, Scottow, Swanton Abbott and Skeyton.

== Amenities ==
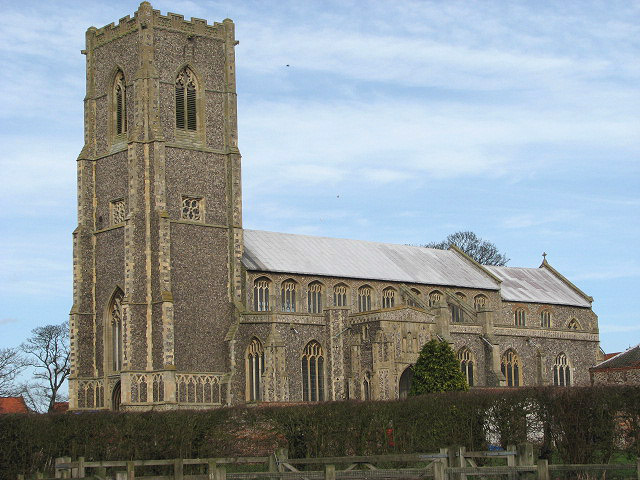
St Mary's church, a Grade I listed building

As of 2020 the village has a primary school, a village hall, and adjacent recreation ground, a pub, and a Church of England parish church dedicated to St Mary the Virgin.

The village is served by Worstead railway station on the Bittern Line.

== Worstead Festival ==
The annual festival, which was first held in 1966, is held in the summer, more specifically on the last weekend of July. It was first hosted to help fund the urgent repairs needed for the village church, since then it has grown in popularity and is now the biggest village festival in Norfolk.

In 1985, Queen Elizabeth the Queen Mother visited the festival to open the new Queen Elizabeth Hall.

In 2020 and 2021, the festival was cancelled due to the coronavirus pandemic despite the fact that many people wanted the festival to continue.
