= Worstead Windmill =

Mill in Worstead, Norfolk, England

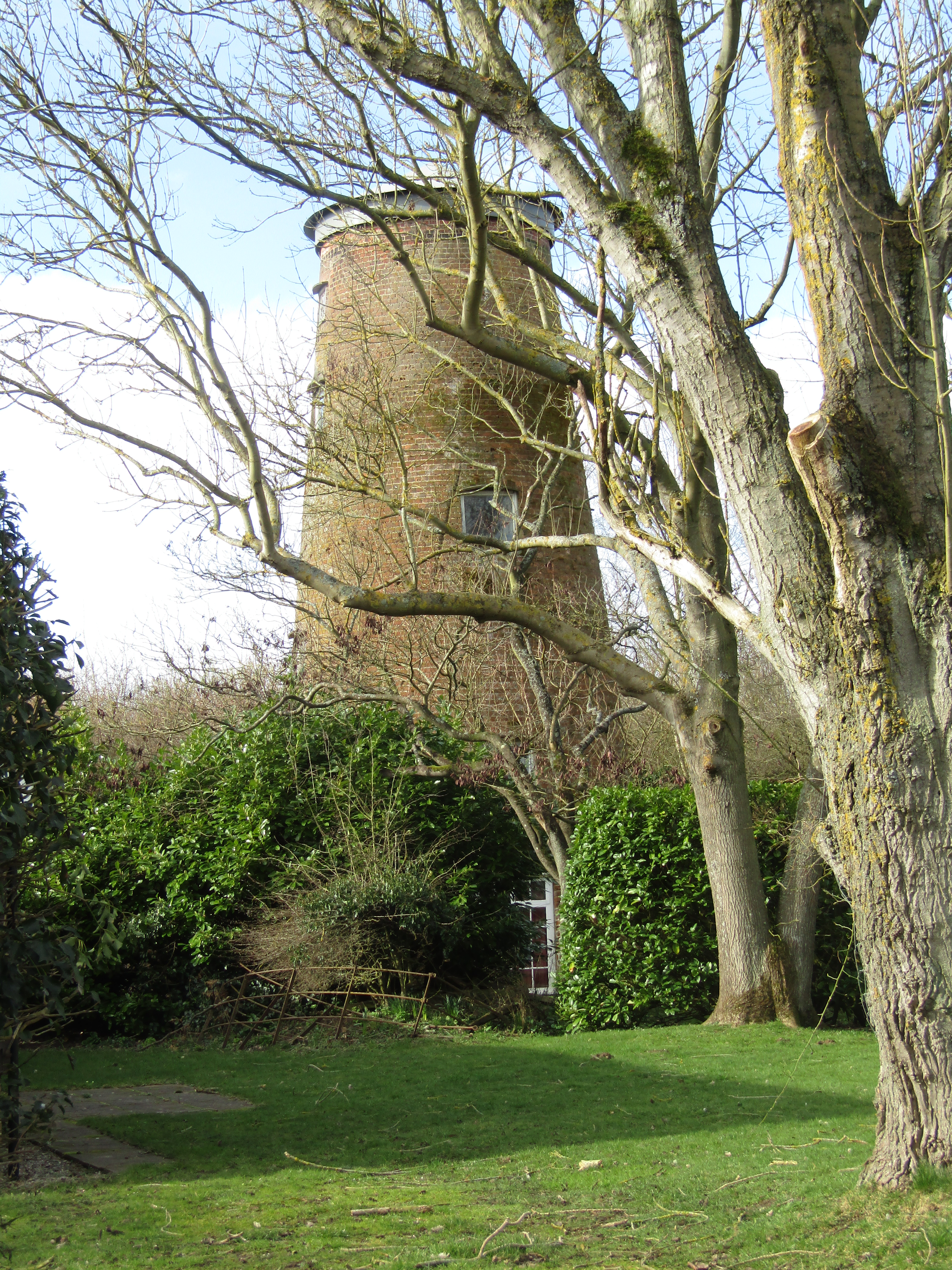
- Worstead Windmill, March 2021
- Interactive map of Worstead Windmill

Origin
- Mill name: Worstead Windmill
- Mill location: Worstead, Norfolk, United Kingdom
- Grid reference: TG 3105 2760
- Coordinates: 52°47′45″N 1°26′20″E
- Year built: 1850s

Information
- Purpose: Corn mill
- Type: Tower mill
- Storeys: Six storeys
- No. of sails: Four
- Type of sails: Patent sails
- Windshaft: Cast iron
- Winding: Fantail
- Fantail blades: Six
- No. of pairs of millstones: Three pairs

Worstead Windmill is a Grade II listed tower mill at Worstead, Norfolk, United Kingdom. Built in the 1850s, it worked by wind until 1902. The mill was later converted to residential use.

== History ==
Worstead Windmill was built c. 1850. The mill was damaged in a gale in December 1863. It was offered for sale in August 1865. It was then owned by Robert Greenacre. The mill offered for sale in 1866 by George Greenacre, who also ran a watermill and a windmill at Hingham, Norfolk. The mill was taken by a Mr. Cross, who was severely injured in an accident at the mill on 15 December 1866, losing a leg and breaking the other in three places when his clothes got caught in the machinery. The mill was in the occupation of Messrs. Cubitt & Walker in 1881, when it was put up for auction. They bought the mill, and worked it until 1922 in conjunction with a watermill at Briggate. The mill lost its sails in a gale in 1903. The mill was listed Grade II on 17 December 1962. Arthur C. Smith surveyed the mill on 23 October 1970. He described the mill as house converted, retaining its cap and windshaft, which were still on the mill in 2007, but photographs show was later removed. A new cap and fantail had been fitted to the mill by 2025.

== Description ==
Worstead Windmill is a six storey tower mill. It had a boat shape cap with petticoat and gallery. Four double Patent sails were carried on a cast iron windshaft. The sails had eight bays of three shutters. The mill was winded by a six-bladed fantail. Three pairs of millstones were driven.
