= Swanton Abbott =

Village in Norfolk, England

Coordinates: 52.78107°N 1.35549°E

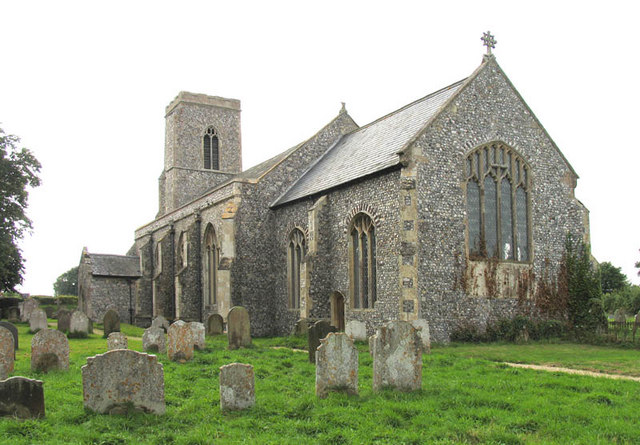
- St Michael's Church

- Location within Norfolk
- Area: 4.76 km^{2} (1.84 sq mi)
- Population: 565 (2011)
  - Density: 119/km^{2} (310/sq mi)
- OS grid reference: TG264257
- Civil parish: Swanton Abbott
- District: North Norfolk
- Shire county: Norfolk
- Region: East
- Country: England
- Sovereign state: United Kingdom
- Post town: NORWICH
- Postcode district: NR10
- Dialling code: 01692
- Police: Norfolk
- Fire: Norfolk
- Ambulance: East of England
- UK Parliament: North Norfolk

Swanton Abbott or Swanton Abbot is a village and civil parish in the district of North Norfolk, in the county of Norfolk, England. The parish has an area of 4.76 square kilometres (1.84 sq mi) and a population of 565 at the 2011 Census (including Westwick). The village lies 4 miles (6.4 km) south of North Walsham, 15 miles (24 km) south of the seaside town of Cromer and 13.5 miles (21.7 km) north by road from the centre of the city of Norwich, Norfolk's administrative centre.

The villages name means 'Herdsmen's farm/settlement'. The village was granted to the Abbot of St Benet Holme by King Cnut.

== Amenities ==
It is served by St Michael's church in the ecclesiastical parish of Worstead. A Wesleyan Reform Union Chapel opened in 1856.

Swanton Abbott Community Primary School is a co-educational school for children from 4–11 years.

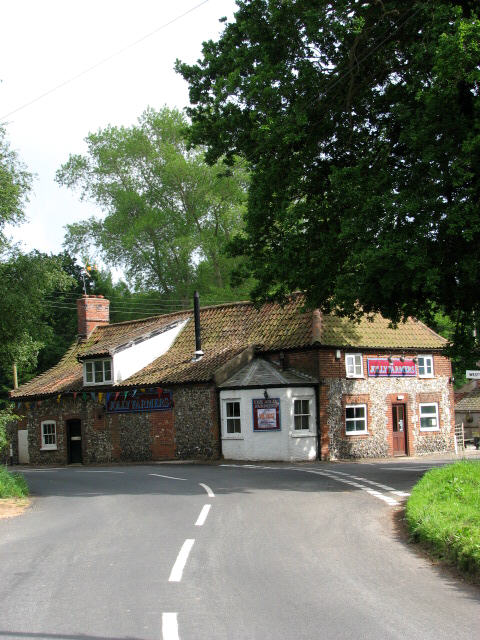
The Jolly Farmers pub in Swanton Abbott

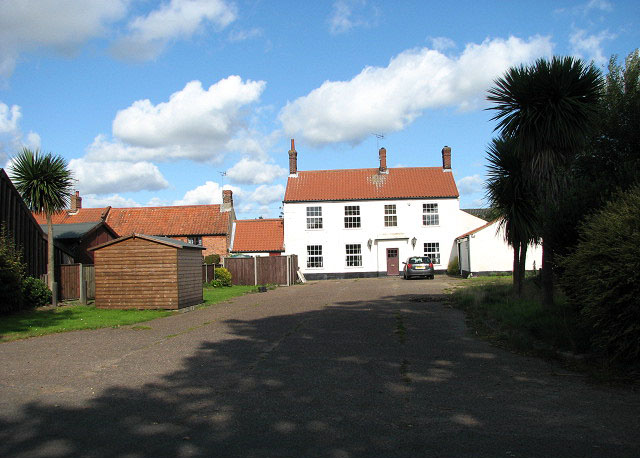
The former Weavers Arms public house in Swanton Abbott

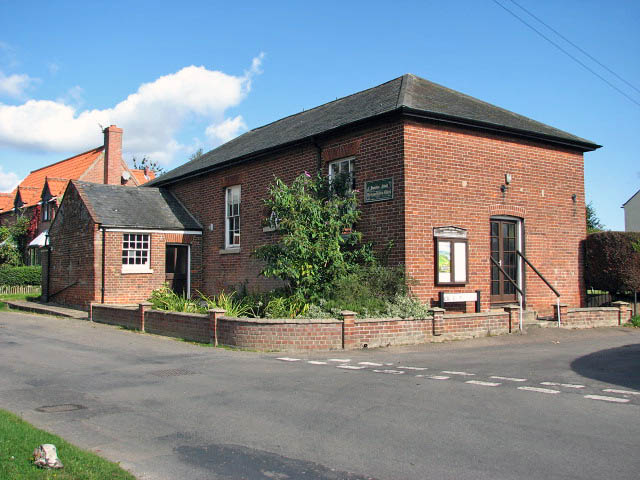
Wesleyan Reform Union Chapel in Swanton Abbott

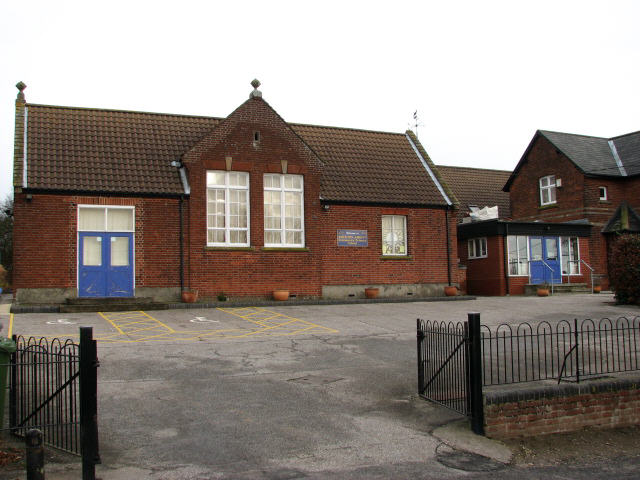
Swanton Abbott primary school
