= Listed buildings in Fakenham =

Non-Civil Parish in Norfolk, England

Fakenham is a town and civil parish in the North Norfolk district of Norfolk, England. It contains 94 listed buildings that are recorded in the National Heritage List for England. Of these one is grade I, two are grade II* and 91 are grade II.

This list is based on the information retrieved online from Historic England.

== Key ==
Grade	Criteria
I	Buildings that are of exceptional interest
II*	Particularly important buildings of more than special interest
II	Buildings that are of special interest

== Listing ==
Name	Grade	Location	Type	Completed (Note: The date given is the date used by Historic England as significant for the initial building or that of an important part in the structure's description.)	Date designated	Grid ref. (Note: The grid reference is based on the British national grid reference system, sometimes known as OSGB36, used by the Ordnance Survey.) Geo-coordinates	Notes	Entry number (Note: The "List Entry Number" is a unique number assigned to each listed building and scheduled monument by Historic England.)	Image	Wikidata
Church of St Peter and St Paul	I		church building		6 March 1959	TF9192629704; 52°49′50″N 0°50′51″E		1039454	Church of St Peter and St Paul More images	Q17536706
Fakenham War Memorial	II		war memorial		12 February 2015	TF9194229627; 52°49′48″N 0°50′52″E		1424172	Fakenham War Memorial More images	Q26677093
Thorpland Hall	II*	NR21 0HD	house		30 November 1951	TF9365132170; 52°51′08″N 0°52′28″E		1171226	Thorpland Hall More images	Q17556172
1 and 3, Bridge Street	II	1 and 3, Bridge Street			30 November 1951	TF9201429618; 52°49′48″N 0°50′56″E		1305705	Upload Photo	Q26592548
11, Bridge Street	II	11, Bridge Street			15 February 1979	TF9201729597; 52°49′47″N 0°50′56″E		1373979	Upload Photo	Q26654894
37, Bridge Street	II	37, Bridge Street			22 April 1975	TF9201929537; 52°49′45″N 0°50′56″E		1305708	Upload Photo	Q26592551
Woodspring	II	43, Bridge Street			15 February 1979	TF9203229479; 52°49′43″N 0°50′56″E		1039453	Upload Photo	Q26291245
4-8, Cattle Market Street	II	4-8, Cattle Market Street			15 February 1979	TF9204729468; 52°49′43″N 0°50′57″E		1171218	Upload Photo	Q26465060
Crinkle Crankle and Other Walls Surrounding Youth and Community Centres (not Included)	II	Church Lanes			11 February 2000	TF9190929763; 52°49′52″N 0°50′50″E		1380084	Upload Photo	Q26660300
Garden Walls to South East of Thorpland Hall	II	Great Snoring Road			15 February 1979	TF9369232147; 52°51′07″N 0°52′31″E		1373980	Upload Photo	Q26654895
Thorpland Hall Farmhouse	II	Great Snoring Road			15 February 1979	TF9381732213; 52°51′09″N 0°52′37″E		1171231	Upload Photo	Q26465074
1, Hall Staithe	II	1, Hall Staithe			15 February 1979	TF9186229633; 52°49′48″N 0°50′47″E		1373981	Upload Photo	Q26654896
The Old Fire Station	II	Hall Staithe			15 February 1979	TF9180129611; 52°49′48″N 0°50′44″E		1171236	Upload Photo	Q26465076
Bridge Over River Wensum	II	Hempton Road			15 February 1979	TF9199429332; 52°49′38″N 0°50′54″E		1171254	Upload Photo	Q26465093
Corn Mill (premises of R.a.picken)	II	Hempton Road			15 February 1979	TF9194829335; 52°49′38″N 0°50′51″E		1171242	Upload Photo	Q26465082
Corn Mill Offices and Store Building (premises of Dewing and Kersley Limited	II	Hempton Road			15 February 1979	TF9197629366; 52°49′39″N 0°50′53″E		1373982	Upload Photo	Q26654897
Original Building of Main Block of Fakenham Grammar School	II	Highfield Road			15 February 1979	TF9180530187; 52°50′06″N 0°50′46″E		1039457	Upload Photo	Q26291249
Tower House	II	25, Holt Road			15 February 1979	TF9224429868; 52°49′55″N 0°51′08″E		1039458	Upload Photo	Q26291250
1, Market Place	II	1, Market Place			15 February 1979	TF9200729640; 52°49′48″N 0°50′55″E		1171261	Upload Photo	Q26465110
2 K6 Telephone Kiosks	II	2 K6 Telephone Kiosks, Market Place			27 October 1989	TF9197129656; 52°49′49″N 0°50′53″E		1049558	Upload Photo	Q26301583
2 and 3, Market Place	II	2 and 3, Market Place			15 February 1979	TF9200829631; 52°49′48″N 0°50′55″E		1373983	Upload Photo	Q26654898
4 and 5, Market Place	II	4 and 5, Market Place			15 February 1979	TF9198729623; 52°49′48″N 0°50′54″E		1171267	Upload Photo	Q26465126
7-9, Market Place	II	7-9, Market Place			15 February 1979	TF9196629616; 52°49′48″N 0°50′53″E		1171276	Upload Photo	Q26465148
10, Market Place	II	10, Market Place			30 November 1951	TF9196329607; 52°49′47″N 0°50′53″E		1373984	Upload Photo	Q26654899
12, Market Place	II	12, Market Place			30 November 1951	TF9194629599; 52°49′47″N 0°50′52″E		1039418	Upload Photo	Q26291208
14, Market Place	II	14, Market Place			30 November 1951	TF9193629597; 52°49′47″N 0°50′51″E		1039419	Upload Photo	Q26291209
16, Market Place	II	16, Market Place			15 February 1979	TF9192529595; 52°49′47″N 0°50′51″E		1039420	Upload Photo	Q26291210
18, Market Place	II	18, Market Place			15 February 1979	TF9190029624; 52°49′48″N 0°50′49″E		1039422	Upload Photo	Q26291212
19, Market Place	II	19, Market Place			15 February 1979	TF9188929625; 52°49′48″N 0°50′49″E		1039423	Upload Photo	Q26291213
23, Market Place	II	23, Market Place			15 February 1979	TF9191729645; 52°49′49″N 0°50′50″E		1374004	Upload Photo	Q26654915
24 and 26, Market Place	II	24 and 26, Market Place			15 February 1979	TF9191929651; 52°49′49″N 0°50′51″E		1039425	Upload Photo	Q26291216
27, Market Place	II	27, Market Place			15 February 1979	TF9190929672; 52°49′49″N 0°50′50″E		1039426	Upload Photo	Q26291217
28 and 29, Market Place	II	28 and 29, Market Place			15 February 1979	TF9191729672; 52°49′49″N 0°50′50″E		1374005	Upload Photo	Q26654916
30, Market Place	II	30, Market Place			15 February 1979	TF9192329672; 52°49′49″N 0°50′51″E		1171344	Upload Photo	Q26465266
The Wooden Horse	II	35, Market Place			15 February 1979	TF9196729669; 52°49′49″N 0°50′53″E		1305651	Upload Photo	Q26592499
Red Lion Hotel	II*	37, Market Place			30 November 1951	TF9198229660; 52°49′49″N 0°50′54″E		1374006	Upload Photo	Q17556975
Ridleys	II	38 and 39, Market Place			15 February 1979	TF9199429672; 52°49′49″N 0°50′55″E		1171349	Upload Photo	Q26465274
Central Cinema	II	Market Place	movie theater		15 February 1979	TF9188629653; 52°49′49″N 0°50′49″E		1039424	Central Cinema More images	Q26291215
Crown Hotel	II	Market Place			30 November 1951	TF9198229587; 52°49′47″N 0°50′54″E		1039459	Upload Photo	Q26291251
No 17. Wall Abutting No 17 to South	II	Market Place			15 February 1979	TF9192129610; 52°49′47″N 0°50′51″E		1039421	Upload Photo	Q26291211
3, Nelson Road	II	3, Nelson Road			15 February 1979	TF9176429906; 52°49′57″N 0°50′43″E		1039428	Upload Photo	Q26291219
Red House	II	14, Nelson Road			15 February 1979	TF9173629960; 52°49′59″N 0°50′41″E		1171358	Upload Photo	Q26465288
21 and 23, Norwich Road	II	21 and 23, Norwich Road			30 November 1951	TF9221629691; 52°49′50″N 0°51′06″E		1039429	Upload Photo	Q26291220
35, Norwich Road	II	35, Norwich Road			15 February 1979	TF9226929695; 52°49′50″N 0°51′09″E		1305617	Upload Photo	Q26684250
Baron's Hall	II	Norwich Road			30 November 1951	TF9252829661; 52°49′48″N 0°51′23″E		1374007	Upload Photo	Q26654917
Heath Farmhouse	II	Norwich Road, NR21 8LZ			30 November 1951	TF9411830082; 52°50′00″N 0°52′49″E		1039456	Upload Photo	Q26291248
4, Norwich Street	II	4, Norwich Street			15 February 1979	TF9201229642; 52°49′48″N 0°50′56″E		1039432	Upload Photo	Q26291223
5, Norwich Street	II	5, Norwich Street			15 February 1979	TF9201529656; 52°49′49″N 0°50′56″E		1171363	Upload Photo	Q26465296
7, Norwich Street	II	7, Norwich Street			15 February 1979	TF9202229657; 52°49′49″N 0°50′56″E		1039430	Upload Photo	Q26291221
9, Norwich Street	II	9, Norwich Street			15 February 1979	TF9202829659; 52°49′49″N 0°50′56″E		1374008	Upload Photo	Q26654919
15 and 17, Norwich Street	II	15 and 17, Norwich Street			15 February 1979	TF9205529661; 52°49′49″N 0°50′58″E		1305621	Upload Photo	Q26592470
30 and 32, Norwich Street	II	30 and 32, Norwich Street			15 February 1979	TF9208329651; 52°49′48″N 0°50′59″E		1305627	Upload Photo	Q26592475
33, Norwich Street	II	33, Norwich Street			15 February 1979	TF9209629668; 52°49′49″N 0°51′00″E		1039431	Upload Photo	Q26291222
34, Norwich Street	II	34, Norwich Street			15 February 1979	TF9209329653; 52°49′49″N 0°51′00″E		1374009	Upload Photo	Q26654920
35, Norwich Street	II	35, Norwich Street			15 February 1979	TF9210329672; 52°49′49″N 0°51′00″E		1171372	Upload Photo	Q26465313
1 and 3, Oak Street	II	1 and 3, Oak Street			15 February 1979	TF9186029671; 52°49′49″N 0°50′47″E		1305630	Upload Photo	Q26592478
2, Oak Street	II	2, Oak Street			15 February 1979	TF9189529678; 52°49′50″N 0°50′49″E		1373971	Upload Photo	Q26654886
4, Oak Street	II	4, Oak Street			15 February 1979	TF9189029684; 52°49′50″N 0°50′49″E		1171404	Upload Photo	Q26465364
5 and 7, Oak Street	II	5 and 7, Oak Street			15 February 1979	TF9185829687; 52°49′50″N 0°50′47″E		1039433	Upload Photo	Q26291224
6, Oak Street	II	6, Oak Street			15 February 1979	TF9188029694; 52°49′50″N 0°50′49″E		1039435	Upload Photo	Q26291226
8 and 10, Oak Street	II	8 and 10, Oak Street			15 February 1979	TF9187329706; 52°49′51″N 0°50′48″E		1171421	Upload Photo	Q26465393
11, Oak Street	II	11, Oak Street			15 February 1979	TF9185229704; 52°49′50″N 0°50′47″E		1374010	Upload Photo	Q26654922
Connaught House	II	15, Oak Street			15 February 1979	TF9184829711; 52°49′51″N 0°50′47″E		1171392	Upload Photo	Q26465344
18, Oak Street	II	18, Oak Street			6 October 1976	TF9185529747; 52°49′52″N 0°50′47″E		1039436	18, Oak Street More images	Q26291228
Dunster	II	20, Oak Street			15 February 1979	TF9184829761; 52°49′52″N 0°50′47″E		1373972	Upload Photo	Q26654887
21, Oak Street	II	21, Oak Street			15 February 1979	TF9181629766; 52°49′53″N 0°50′45″E		1039434	Upload Photo	Q26291225
32 and 34, Oak Street	II	32 and 34, Oak Street			15 February 1979	TF9182029815; 52°49′54″N 0°50′46″E		1039437	Upload Photo	Q26291229
33 and 35, Oak Street	II	33 and 35, Oak Street			15 February 1979	TF9180629803; 52°49′54″N 0°50′45″E		1171398	Upload Photo	Q26465355
36, Oak Street	II	36, Oak Street			15 February 1979	TF9182429823; 52°49′54″N 0°50′46″E		1171426	Upload Photo	Q26465405
Star Inn	II	44, Oak Street			30 November 1951	TF9183029854; 52°49′55″N 0°50′46″E		1373973	Star Inn	Q26654889
52 and 54, Oak Street	II	52 and 54, Oak Street			15 February 1979	TF9181129875; 52°49′56″N 0°50′45″E		1305611	Upload Photo	Q26592460
Lamp Post Immediately North of Number 20	II	Oak Street			15 February 1979	TF9184329768; 52°49′53″N 0°50′47″E		1171425	Upload Photo	Q26465402
1, Old Post Office Street	II	1, Old Post Office Street			15 February 1979	TF9185929642; 52°49′48″N 0°50′47″E		1039438	Upload Photo	Q26291230
3, Old Post Office Street	II	3, Old Post Office Street			15 February 1979	TF9185729648; 52°49′49″N 0°50′47″E		1039395	Upload Photo	Q26291183
Penny Wise	II	5, Old Post Office Street			15 February 1979	TF9186129655; 52°49′49″N 0°50′47″E		1039396	Upload Photo	Q26291185
3, Quaker Lane	II	3, Quaker Lane			15 February 1979	TF9188029612; 52°49′47″N 0°50′48″E		1039397	Upload Photo	Q26291186
The Womens Institute Cottage	II	11, Quaker Lane			15 February 1979	TF9189829597; 52°49′47″N 0°50′49″E		1039398	Upload Photo	Q26291187
The Rampant Horse Inn	II	3, Queens Road	pub		15 February 1979	TF9210629702; 52°49′50″N 0°51′01″E		1039399	The Rampant Horse Inn More images	Q26291188
3, Swan Street	II	3, Swan Street			15 February 1979	TF9194929454; 52°49′42″N 0°50′52″E		1039400	Upload Photo	Q26291189
5-11, Swan Street	II	5-11, Swan Street			15 February 1979	TF9193829475; 52°49′43″N 0°50′51″E		1039401	Upload Photo	Q26291190
Remains of Church of St Thomas, Thorpland South East of Thorpland Hall	II	Thorpland South East Of Thorpland Hall, Great Snoring Road	church ruin		6 March 1959	TF9371032120; 52°51′06″N 0°52′31″E		1039455	Remains of Church of St Thomas, Thorpland South East of Thorpland Hall More images	Q26291246
7 and 9, Tunn Street	II	7 and 9, Tunn Street			15 February 1979	TF9191929540; 52°49′45″N 0°50′50″E		1039402	Upload Photo	Q26291191
Manor House	II	10-16, Tunn Street			15 February 1979	TF9190229540; 52°49′45″N 0°50′49″E		1373994	Upload Photo	Q26654907
21, Tunn Street	II	21, Tunn Street			30 November 1951	TF9192529489; 52°49′43″N 0°50′51″E		1039403	Upload Photo	Q26291192
Garden Boundary Wall (approximately 120 Metres) and Gate Piers South of Grove House Along Tunn Street and Mill Lane	II	Tunn Street			15 February 1979	TF9190529411; 52°49′41″N 0°50′49″E		1171454	Upload Photo	Q26465446
Grove House	II	Tunn Street, NR21 9BJ			30 November 1951	TF9190829502; 52°49′44″N 0°50′50″E		1039404	Upload Photo	Q26291193
1 and 3, Wells Road	II	1 and 3, Wells Road			15 February 1979	TF9179229916; 52°49′57″N 0°50′44″E		1373995	Upload Photo	Q26654908
5, Wells Road	II	5, Wells Road			15 February 1979	TF9179429922; 52°49′58″N 0°50′44″E		1039405	Upload Photo	Q26291195
11, Wells Road	II	11, Wells Road			15 February 1979	TF9179829996; 52°50′00″N 0°50′45″E		1171462	Upload Photo	Q26465462
Borrisokane	II	12, Wells Road			15 February 1979	TF9182829947; 52°49′58″N 0°50′46″E		1039406	Upload Photo	Q26291196
13 and 15, Wells Road	II	13 and 15, Wells Road			15 February 1979	TF9180130007; 52°50′00″N 0°50′45″E		1373996	Upload Photo	Q26654909
17 and 19, Wells Road	II	17 and 19, Wells Road			15 February 1979	TF9180630017; 52°50′01″N 0°50′45″E		1171466	Upload Photo	Q26465468
44 and 46, Wells Road	II	44 and 46, Wells Road			15 February 1979	TF9183630045; 52°50′02″N 0°50′47″E		1171469	Upload Photo	Q26465471
Fakenham Conservative Club	II	Whitehorse Street			15 February 1979	TF9213629641; 52°49′48″N 0°51′02″E		1039407	Upload Photo	Q26291197

== See also ==
- Grade I listed buildings in Norfolk
- Grade II* listed buildings in Norfolk

== Sources ==
- Wilson, Bill; Pevsner, Nikolaus (1999) [1962], Norfolk 2: North-West and South, The Buildings of England, New Haven and London: Yale University Press, ISBN 978-0-300-09657-6
