= Listed buildings in Holt, Norfolk =

Non-Civil Parish in Norfolk, England

Holt is a town and civil parish in the North Norfolk district of Norfolk, England. It contains 119 listed buildings that are recorded in the National Heritage List for England. Of these two are grade II* and 117 are grade II.

This list is based on the information retrieved online from Historic England.

== Key ==
Grade	Criteria
I	Buildings that are of exceptional interest
II*	Particularly important buildings of more than special interest
II	Buildings that are of special interest

== Listing ==
Name	Grade	Location	Type	Completed (Note: The date given is the date used by Historic England as significant for the initial building or that of an important part in the structure's description.)	Date designated	Grid ref. (Note: The grid reference is based on the British national grid reference system, sometimes known as OSGB36, used by the Ordnance Survey.) Geo-coordinates	Notes	Entry number (Note: The "List Entry Number" is a unique number assigned to each listed building and scheduled monument by Historic England.)	Image	Wikidata
Holt War Memorial	II	NR25 6BE	war memorial		4 April 2012	TG0792838749; 52°54′21″N 1°05′26″E		1407823	Holt War Memorial More images	Q26675962
1 and 3, Albert Street	II	1 and 3, Albert Street			30 May 1978	TG0775938819; 52°54′24″N 1°05′17″E		1049334	Upload Photo	Q26301370
4, Albert Street	II	4, Albert Street			8 September 1983	TG0778138834; 52°54′24″N 1°05′18″E		1049328	Upload Photo	Q26301364
5-19, Albert Street	II	5-19, Albert Street			30 May 1978	TG0770938866; 52°54′25″N 1°05′14″E		1168881	Upload Photo	Q26462106
Osokozi	II	6, Albert Street			8 September 1983	TG0777538834; 52°54′24″N 1°05′18″E		1049329	Upload Photo	Q26301365
8, Albert Street	II	8, Albert Street			8 September 1983	TG0776738838; 52°54′24″N 1°05′17″E		1373746	Upload Photo	Q26654682
12, Albert Street	II	12, Albert Street			8 September 1983	TG0774638854; 52°54′25″N 1°05′16″E		1049330	Upload Photo	Q26301366
14, Albert Street	II	14, Albert Street			8 September 1983	TG0774038859; 52°54′25″N 1°05′16″E		1373747	Upload Photo	Q26654683
16, Albert Street	II	16, Albert Street			8 September 1983	TG0773538864; 52°54′25″N 1°05′16″E		1049331	Upload Photo	Q26301367
18 and 20, Albert Street	II	18 and 20, Albert Street			8 September 1983	TG0773238867; 52°54′25″N 1°05′15″E		1049332	Upload Photo	Q26301368
23, Albert Street	II	23, Albert Street			8 September 1983	TG0769838884; 52°54′26″N 1°05′14″E		1373750	Upload Photo	Q26654686
The Nook	II	24, Albert Street			8 September 1983	TG0772438879; 52°54′26″N 1°05′15″E		1373748	Upload Photo	Q26654684
25 and 27, Albert Street	II	25 and 27, Albert Street			8 September 1983	TG0769338884; 52°54′26″N 1°05′13″E		1168885	Upload Photo	Q26462109
28 and 30, Albert Street	II	28 and 30, Albert Street			8 September 1983	TG0770238919; 52°54′27″N 1°05′14″E		1373749	Upload Photo	Q26654685
29, Albert Street	II	29, Albert Street			8 September 1983	TG0769038893; 52°54′26″N 1°05′13″E		1049335	Upload Photo	Q26301371
33, Albert Street	II	33, Albert Street			8 September 1983	TG0768238909; 52°54′27″N 1°05′13″E		1306786	Upload Photo	Q26593522
Oddfellows' Hall	II	35, Albert Street			8 September 1983	TG0767838914; 52°54′27″N 1°05′13″E		1049336	Upload Photo	Q26301372
Greenways	II	1, Bull Street			8 September 1983	TG0779238824; 52°54′24″N 1°05′19″E		1049337	Upload Photo	Q26301373
3, Bull Street	II	3, Bull Street			8 September 1983	TG0779938819; 52°54′24″N 1°05′19″E		1168890	Upload Photo	Q26462114
8, Bull Street	II	8, Bull Street			8 September 1983	TG0785438784; 52°54′23″N 1°05′22″E		1049341	Upload Photo	Q26301379
Praze Cottage	II	24, Bull Street			8 September 1983	TG0790238796; 52°54′23″N 1°05′24″E		1049342	Upload Photo	Q26301380
27, Bull Street	II	27, Bull Street			8 September 1983	TG0783638804; 52°54′23″N 1°05′21″E		1049338	Upload Photo	Q26301375
37, Bull Street	II	37, Bull Street, NR25 6HP			8 September 1983	TG0787338807; 52°54′23″N 1°05′23″E		1168892	Upload Photo	Q26462116
39, Bull Street	II	39, Bull Street			19 December 1979	TG0788838811; 52°54′23″N 1°05′24″E		1049339	Upload Photo	Q26301376
Hanworth House	II	43, Bull Street			20 February 1952	TG0790438819; 52°54′24″N 1°05′25″E		1168900	Upload Photo	Q26462123
45 and 47, Bull Street	II	45 and 47, Bull Street			8 September 1983	TG0792038821; 52°54′24″N 1°05′25″E		1049340	Upload Photo	Q26301378
49 and 49a, Bull Street	II	49 and 49a, Bull Street			8 September 1983	TG0792938826; 52°54′24″N 1°05′26″E		1168906	Upload Photo	Q26462129
3,4,5 and 6, Chapel Yard	II	3, 4, 5 and 6, Chapel Yard			8 September 1983	TG0776238862; 52°54′25″N 1°05′17″E		1168908	Upload Photo	Q26462132
Janaway House	II	1, Church Street			4 October 1960	TG0796238772; 52°54′22″N 1°05′28″E		1169650	Upload Photo	Q26462829
3, Church Street	II	3, Church Street			8 September 1983	TG0797438774; 52°54′22″N 1°05′28″E		1373751	Upload Photo	Q26654687
Parish Church of St Andrew	II*	Church Street, NR25 6BB	church building		4 October 1960	TG0811938796; 52°54′23″N 1°05′36″E		1306557	Parish Church of St Andrew More images	Q17556586
Holt Hall	II	Cley Road			8 September 1983	TG0790939733; 52°54′53″N 1°05′27″E		1169415	Upload Photo	Q26462606
Lawn Farm House	II	Cley Road			8 September 1983	TG0757640568; 52°55′21″N 1°05′11″E		1049343	Upload Photo	Q26301381
13, Cromer Road	II	13, Cromer Road			8 September 1983	TG0797638868; 52°54′25″N 1°05′28″E		1306563	Upload Photo	Q26593329
29, Cromer Road	II	29, Cromer Road			8 September 1983	TG0804838928; 52°54′27″N 1°05′32″E		1049344	Upload Photo	Q26301382
School Chapel	II	Cromer Road			8 September 1983	TG0888839386; 52°54′41″N 1°06′18″E		1306528	Upload Photo	Q26593299
The Grove	II	Cromer Road			6 May 1977	TG0897039165; 52°54′33″N 1°06′22″E		1373712	Upload Photo	Q26654654
Woodlands	II	Cromer Road			8 September 1983	TG0858539177; 52°54′34″N 1°06′02″E		1049345	Upload Photo	Q26301383
1 and 3, Cross Street	II	1 and 3, Cross Street, NR25 6HZ			8 September 1983	TG0773438839; 52°54′25″N 1°05′15″E		1169430	Upload Photo	Q26462623
4, Cross Street	II	4, Cross Street			8 September 1983	TG0769638841; 52°54′25″N 1°05′13″E		1373713	Upload Photo	Q26654655
1, Fish Hill	II	1, Fish Hill			8 September 1983	TG0788938782; 52°54′22″N 1°05′24″E		1049346	Upload Photo	Q26301384
3 and 5, Fish Hill	II	3 and 5, Fish Hill			8 September 1983	TG0789738783; 52°54′22″N 1°05′24″E		1169433	Upload Photo	Q26462626
Premises Occupied by Spar Foodmarket	II	4, Fish Hill			8 September 1983	TG0793038781; 52°54′22″N 1°05′26″E		1049347	Upload Photo	Q26301385
8, Fish Hill	II	8, Fish Hill			8 September 1983	TG0793138811; 52°54′23″N 1°05′26″E		1049304	Upload Photo	Q26301341
13, Fish Hill	II	13, Fish Hill			8 September 1983	TG0790638797; 52°54′23″N 1°05′25″E		1373714	Upload Photo	Q26654656
Barn 40 Yards North-east of Heath Farm House	II	Hempstead Road			8 September 1983	TG0927238780; 52°54′20″N 1°06′38″E		1049305	Upload Photo	Q26301342
Heath Farm House	II	Hempstead Road			8 September 1983	TG0924738736; 52°54′19″N 1°06′36″E		1373733	Upload Photo	Q26654669
Water Mill and Mill House	II	Hempstead Road, NR25 6JX			8 September 1983	TG0947338059; 52°53′57″N 1°06′47″E		1373734	Upload Photo	Q26654670
Lloyds Bank	II	1, 3, And 5, High Street			20 February 1952	TG0781038727; 52°54′21″N 1°05′19″E		1373738	Upload Photo	Q26654674
2 and 4, High Street	II	2 and 4, High Street			8 September 1983	TG0778738759; 52°54′22″N 1°05′18″E		1049306	Upload Photo	Q26301343
6 and 8, High Street	II	6 and 8, High Street			8 September 1983	TG0777938750; 52°54′22″N 1°05′18″E		1049307	Upload Photo	Q26301344
7,9,and 11, High Street	II	7, 9, and 11, High Street			8 September 1983	TG0780138729; 52°54′21″N 1°05′19″E		1049312	Upload Photo	Q26301350
13 and 15, High Street	II	13 and 15, High Street			4 October 1960	TG0778938721; 52°54′21″N 1°05′18″E		1169480	Upload Photo	Q26462671
18, High Street	II	18, High Street			8 September 1983	TG0773638728; 52°54′21″N 1°05′15″E		1373735	Upload Photo	Q26654671
20 and 22, High Street	II	20 and 22, High Street			8 September 1983	TG0773938722; 52°54′21″N 1°05′15″E		1049308	Upload Photo	Q26301345
21 and 23, High Street	II	21 and 23, High Street			20 February 1952	TG0774438698; 52°54′20″N 1°05′16″E		1169491	Upload Photo	Q26462683
24, High Street	II	24, High Street			8 September 1983	TG0773238716; 52°54′21″N 1°05′15″E		1373736	Upload Photo	Q26654672
26 and 28, High Street	II	26 and 28, High Street			8 September 1983	TG0772338712; 52°54′20″N 1°05′15″E		1049309	Upload Photo	Q26301346
27 and 29, High Street	II	27 and 29, High Street			8 September 1983	TG0773238682; 52°54′19″N 1°05′15″E		1049313	Upload Photo	Q26301351
33, High Street	II	33, High Street			8 September 1983	TG0771938685; 52°54′20″N 1°05′14″E		1169500	Upload Photo	Q26462692
34 and 36, High Street	II	34 and 36, High Street			8 September 1983	TG0769738705; 52°54′20″N 1°05′13″E		1373737	Upload Photo	Q26654673
High Silver	II	35 and 37, High Street			21 July 1975	TG0770938671; 52°54′19″N 1°05′14″E		1049314	Upload Photo	Q26301352
38,40 and 42, High Street	II	38, 40 and 42, High Street			8 September 1983	TG0768338696; 52°54′20″N 1°05′12″E		1306545	Upload Photo	Q26593313
39, High Street	II	39, High Street			21 July 1975	TG0770538668; 52°54′19″N 1°05′14″E		1169511	Upload Photo	Q26462705
46, High Street	II	46, High Street			8 September 1983	TG0767238695; 52°54′20″N 1°05′12″E		1049310	Upload Photo	Q26301347
48, High Street	II	48, High Street			8 September 1983	TG0767038693; 52°54′20″N 1°05′12″E		1169460	Upload Photo	Q26462652
50, High Street	II	50, High Street			8 September 1983	TG0766338691; 52°54′20″N 1°05′11″E		1049311	Upload Photo	Q26301348
52, High Street	II	52, High Street			8 September 1983	TG0765738690; 52°54′20″N 1°05′11″E		1169461	Upload Photo	Q26462653
Kings Head Public House	II	High Street	pub		20 February 1952	TG0776838706; 52°54′20″N 1°05′17″E		1373739	Kings Head Public House More images	Q26654675
Hill House	II	Letheringsett Hill			20 February 1952	TG0763838664; 52°54′19″N 1°05′10″E		1049315	Upload Photo	Q26301353
The Old Rectory	II*	Letheringsett Hill			20 February 1952	TG0724038750; 52°54′22″N 1°04′49″E		1049316	Upload Photo	Q17555830
Tithe Barn	II	Letheringsett Hill			8 September 1983	TG0702438715; 52°54′21″N 1°04′37″E		1306496	Upload Photo	Q26593270
1, Market Place	II	1, Market Place			8 September 1983	TG0780938765; 52°54′22″N 1°05′19″E		1049320	Upload Photo	Q26301357
2, Market Place	II	2, Market Place			20 February 1952	TG0783438735; 52°54′21″N 1°05′21″E		1049317	Upload Photo	Q26301354
3 and 3a, Market Place	II	3 and 3a, Market Place			8 September 1983	TG0782338757; 52°54′22″N 1°05′20″E		1373740	Upload Photo	Q26654676
Feathers Hotel	II	4 and 6, Market Place	hotel		20 February 1952	TG0784838730; 52°54′21″N 1°05′21″E		1169534	Feathers Hotel More images	Q26462727
5, Market Place	II	5, Market Place			8 September 1983	TG0782938759; 52°54′22″N 1°05′20″E		1169556	Upload Photo	Q26462748
8, Market Place	II	8, Market Place			3 January 1975	TG0787238738; 52°54′21″N 1°05′23″E		1049318	Upload Photo	Q26301355
10, Market Place	II	10, Market Place			4 October 1960	TG0789038740; 52°54′21″N 1°05′24″E		1306469	Upload Photo	Q26593246
11 and 13, Market Place	II	11 and 13, Market Place			4 October 1960	TG0785038771; 52°54′22″N 1°05′22″E		1049321	Upload Photo	Q26301358
12, Market Place	II	12, Market Place			4 October 1960	TG0790138738; 52°54′21″N 1°05′24″E		1049319	Upload Photo	Q26301356
14, Market Place	II	14, Market Place			4 October 1960	TG0790838736; 52°54′21″N 1°05′25″E		1306472	Upload Photo	Q26593249
17,19 and 21, Market Place	II	17, 19 and 21, Market Place			8 September 1983	TG0786438771; 52°54′22″N 1°05′22″E		1169565	Upload Photo	Q26462755
23, Market Place	II	23, Market Place			28 January 1980	TG0787838774; 52°54′22″N 1°05′23″E		1049322	Upload Photo	Q26301359
27, Market Place	II	27, Market Place			8 September 1983	TG0790438766; 52°54′22″N 1°05′24″E		1169572	Upload Photo	Q26462761
31 and 33, Market Place	II	31 and 33, Market Place			8 September 1983	TG0792138768; 52°54′22″N 1°05′25″E		1373741	Upload Photo	Q26654677
35, Market Place	II	35, Market Place			8 September 1983	TG0792738767; 52°54′22″N 1°05′26″E		1169578	Upload Photo	Q26462765
School House	II	Market Place			8 September 1983	TG0796438743; 52°54′21″N 1°05′28″E		1049323	Upload Photo	Q26301360
26, Albert Street (see Details for Further Address Information)	II	1, Mill Street			8 September 1983	TG0770838905; 52°54′27″N 1°05′14″E		1049333	Upload Photo	Q26301369
11, New Street	II	11, New Street			8 September 1983	TG0770438781; 52°54′23″N 1°05′14″E		1169595	Upload Photo	Q26462780
16, New Street	II	16, New Street			8 September 1983	TG0771438805; 52°54′23″N 1°05′14″E		1169585	Upload Photo	Q26462772
17-27, New Street	II	17-27, New Street			8 September 1983	TG0768738809; 52°54′24″N 1°05′13″E		1373743	Upload Photo	Q26654679
St John Hall	II	18, New Street			8 September 1983	TG0771738829; 52°54′24″N 1°05′15″E		1373742	Upload Photo	Q26654678
Cranmer House	II	20 and 22, New Street			8 September 1983	TG0768638847; 52°54′25″N 1°05′13″E		1049324	Upload Photo	Q26301361
Pear Tree Cottage	II	24, New Street			8 September 1983	TG0767738863; 52°54′25″N 1°05′12″E		1169593	Upload Photo	Q26462779
28, New Street	II	28, New Street			8 September 1983	TG0765938892; 52°54′26″N 1°05′12″E		1049325	Upload Photo	Q26301362
33, New Street	II	33, New Street			8 September 1983	TG0767538827; 52°54′24″N 1°05′12″E		1049282	Upload Photo	Q26301319
35, New Street	II	35, New Street			8 September 1983	TG0765138868; 52°54′26″N 1°05′11″E		1373762	Upload Photo	Q26654697
Barn Cottage	II	1, Norwich Road			21 July 1975	TG0770438646; 52°54′18″N 1°05′13″E		1049283	Upload Photo	Q26301320
3, Norwich Road	II	3, Norwich Road			21 July 1975	TG0770838639; 52°54′18″N 1°05′14″E		1373763	Upload Photo	Q26654698
5, Norwich Road	II	5, Norwich Road			21 July 1975	TG0771838629; 52°54′18″N 1°05′14″E		1049284	Upload Photo	Q26301321
27 and 29, Norwich Road	II	27 and 29, Norwich Road			21 July 1975	TG0772238613; 52°54′17″N 1°05′14″E		1373764	Upload Photo	Q26654699
37 and 39, Norwich Road	II	37 and 39, Norwich Road			21 July 1975	TG0772438602; 52°54′17″N 1°05′14″E		1049285	Upload Photo	Q26301322
Bacon's House	II	41, Norwich Road			31 July 1973	TG0776238563; 52°54′16″N 1°05′16″E		1049286	Upload Photo	Q26301324
Garden Wall Fronting No 41 Norwich Road	II	Norwich Road			31 July 1973	TG0773138558; 52°54′15″N 1°05′15″E		1373765	Upload Photo	Q26654700
Methodist Church	II	Obelisk Plain			21 April 1983	TG0765638642; 52°54′18″N 1°05′11″E		1373766	Upload Photo	Q26654701
Milestone	II	Obelisk Plain			8 September 1983	TG0768338675; 52°54′19″N 1°05′12″E		1049287	Upload Photo	Q26301326
Signpost	II	Obelisk Plain	signpost		8 September 1983	TG0767838674; 52°54′19″N 1°05′12″E		1169605	Signpost More images	Q26462789
3-21, Pearsons Lane	II	3-21, Pearsons Lane			8 September 1983	TG0843838863; 52°54′24″N 1°05′53″E		1049288	Upload Photo	Q26301327
1,3, and 5, Shirehall Plain	II	1, 3, And 5, Shirehall Plain			8 September 1983	TG0778638776; 52°54′22″N 1°05′18″E		1049289	Upload Photo	Q26301328
The Shirehall	II	Shirehall Plain			11 May 1978	TG0780638799; 52°54′23″N 1°05′19″E		1169620	Upload Photo	Q26462802
Fighting Henry Public House	II	2, Station Road	pub		8 September 1983	TG0792938706; 52°54′20″N 1°05′26″E		1169633	Fighting Henry Public House More images	Q26462813
4 and 6, Station Road	II	4 and 6, Station Road			8 September 1983	TG0794938712; 52°54′20″N 1°05′27″E		1373767	Upload Photo	Q26654702
8, Station Road	II	8, Station Road			8 September 1983	TG0795438709; 52°54′20″N 1°05′27″E		1169644	Upload Photo	Q26462823
12-18, Station Road	II	12-18, Station Road			8 September 1983	TG0797538696; 52°54′20″N 1°05′28″E		1049290	Upload Photo	Q26301329
Shrublands	II	28, Station Road			8 September 1983	TG0800138625; 52°54′17″N 1°05′29″E		1373768	Upload Photo	Q26654703
Nelson House	II	2, White Lion Street			8 September 1983	TG0795738781; 52°54′22″N 1°05′27″E		1049291	Upload Photo	Q26301330
Wansbeck House	II	6, White Lion Street			8 September 1983	TG0796438811; 52°54′23″N 1°05′28″E		1169660	Upload Photo	Q26462839
White Lion Public House	II	White Lion Street			8 September 1983	TG0796238825; 52°54′24″N 1°05′28″E		1049292	Upload Photo	Q26301331

== See also ==
- Grade I listed buildings in Norfolk
- Grade II* listed buildings in Norfolk

== Sources ==
- Wilson, Bill; Pevsner, Nikolaus (1999) [1962], Norfolk 2: North-West and South, The Buildings of England, New Haven and London: Yale University Press, ISBN 978-0-300-09657-6
