= Listed buildings in Blakeney, Norfolk =

Non-Civil Parish in Norfolk, England

Blakeney is a village and civil parish in the North Norfolk district of Norfolk, England. It contains 95 listed buildings that are recorded in the National Heritage List for England. Of these one is grade I, five are grade II* and 84 are grade II.

This list is based on the information retrieved online from Historic England.

== Key ==
Grade	Criteria
I	Buildings that are of exceptional interest
II*	Particularly important buildings of more than special interest
II	Buildings that are of special interest

== Listing ==
Name	Grade	Location	Type	Completed (Note: The date given is the date used by Historic England as significant for the initial building or that of an important part in the structure's description.)	Date designated	Grid ref. (Note: The grid reference is based on the British national grid reference system, sometimes known as OSGB36, used by the Ordnance Survey.) Geo-coordinates	Notes	Entry number (Note: The "List Entry Number" is a unique number assigned to each listed building and scheduled monument by Historic England.)	Image	Wikidata
About 120 Metres of Boundary Wall, 50 Metres North of Friary Farmhouse	II	50 Metres North Of Friary Farmhouse, Cley Road			15 February 1979	TG0320544095; 52°57′21″N 1°01′25″E		1039496	Upload Photo	Q26291290
Barn Immediately South of Friary Farmhouse	II	Cley Road			15 February 1979	TG0320044004; 52°57′18″N 1°01′25″E		1373960	Upload Photo	Q26654875
Church of St Nicholas	I	Cley Road	church building		6 March 1959	TG0330943598; 52°57′04″N 1°01′30″E		1039495	Church of St Nicholas More images	Q7594944
Friary Farmhouse	II	Cley Road			6 March 1959	TG0319944039; 52°57′19″N 1°01′25″E		1253063	Upload Photo	Q26544868
The Granary	II	1-6, High Street			30 November 1951	TG0279744064; 52°57′20″N 1°01′03″E		1373961	Upload Photo	Q26654876
15, High Street	II	15, High Street			15 February 1979	TG0284944052; 52°57′20″N 1°01′06″E		1373988	Upload Photo	Q26654902
17-25, High Street	II	17-25, High Street			15 February 1979	TG0285444044; 52°57′19″N 1°01′06″E		1170000	Upload Photo	Q26463239
Barclays Bank Post Office	II	20, High Street			15 February 1979	TG0283143994; 52°57′18″N 1°01′05″E		1373962	Upload Photo	Q26654877
22, High Street	II	22, High Street			15 February 1979	TG0281843975; 52°57′17″N 1°01′04″E		1373963	Upload Photo	Q26654878
24, High Street	II	24, High Street			15 February 1979	TG0282643968; 52°57′17″N 1°01′05″E		1039500	Upload Photo	Q26291295
26 and 28, High Street	II	26 and 28, High Street			15 February 1979	TG0284243977; 52°57′17″N 1°01′06″E		1169857	Upload Photo	Q26463032
S Loose and Son	II	30, High Street			15 February 1979	TG0285143967; 52°57′17″N 1°01′06″E		1373964	Upload Photo	Q26654879
31 and 33, High Street	II	31 and 33, High Street			15 February 1979	TG0283344035; 52°57′19″N 1°01′05″E		1039472	Upload Photo	Q26291265
32, High Street	II	32, High Street			15 February 1979	TG0285443963; 52°57′17″N 1°01′06″E		1306309	Upload Photo	Q26593102
Anchor	II	35, High Street			15 February 1979	TG0282644027; 52°57′19″N 1°01′05″E		1170009	Upload Photo	Q26463255
Dolphin Cottage and Nos. 39 and 41	II	37 (dolphin Cottage), 39 and 41, High Street			15 February 1979	TG0283644023; 52°57′19″N 1°01′05″E		1039473	Upload Photo	Q26291266
38-44, High Street	II	38-44, High Street			15 February 1979	TG0282243950; 52°57′16″N 1°01′04″E		1039502	Upload Photo	Q26291297
Yew Tree Cottage	II	43, High Street			15 February 1979	TG0284444013; 52°57′18″N 1°01′06″E		1306256	Upload Photo	Q26593055
46, High Street	II	46, High Street			15 February 1979	TG0285643956; 52°57′17″N 1°01′06″E		1169882	Upload Photo	Q26463056
47 and 49, High Street	II	47 and 49, High Street			15 February 1979	TG0284144002; 52°57′18″N 1°01′06″E		1373989	Upload Photo	Q26654903
51-55, High Street	II	51-55, High Street			15 February 1979	TG0285444009; 52°57′18″N 1°01′06″E		1306260	Upload Photo	Q26593058
52, High Street	II	52, High Street			15 February 1979	TG0285943945; 52°57′16″N 1°01′06″E		1373965	Upload Photo	Q26654880
54, High Street	II	54, High Street			15 February 1979	TG0286643949; 52°57′16″N 1°01′07″E		1306314	Upload Photo	Q26593107
56, High Street	II	56, High Street			15 February 1979	TG0286643944; 52°57′16″N 1°01′07″E		1039503	Upload Photo	Q26291298
59, High Street	II	59, High Street			15 February 1979	TG0285343990; 52°57′18″N 1°01′06″E		1039474	Upload Photo	Q26291267
St Margaret's	II	61, High Street			15 February 1979	TG0285743984; 52°57′17″N 1°01′06″E		1373990	Upload Photo	Q26654905
Flint Cottage	II	65, High Street, NR25 7NA			15 February 1979	TG0288943982; 52°57′17″N 1°01′08″E		1170031	Upload Photo	Q26463286
70-74, High Street	II	70-74, High Street			15 February 1979	TG0287843925; 52°57′16″N 1°01′07″E		1169893	Upload Photo	Q26463076
69a and 71, High Street	II	69a and 71, High Street			15 February 1979	TG0286543972; 52°57′17″N 1°01′07″E		1039475	Upload Photo	Q26291268
Roundstones	II	78 and 80, High Street			15 February 1979	TG0288843917; 52°57′15″N 1°01′08″E		1373966	Upload Photo	Q26654881
81, High Street	II	81, High Street			15 February 1979	TG0289543967; 52°57′17″N 1°01′08″E		1170049	Upload Photo	Q26463317
82 and 84, High Street	II	82 and 84, High Street			15 February 1979	TG0289843902; 52°57′15″N 1°01′08″E		1039460	Upload Photo	Q26291252
83 and 85, High Street	II	83 and 85, High Street			15 February 1979	TG0290843955; 52°57′16″N 1°01′09″E		1039476	Upload Photo	Q26291269
86, High Street	II	86, High Street			30 November 1951	TG0289643888; 52°57′14″N 1°01′08″E		1039461	Upload Photo	Q26291253
87 and 89, High Street	II	87 and 89, High Street			15 February 1979	TG0289143948; 52°57′16″N 1°01′08″E		1170062	Upload Photo	Q26463332
88, High Street	II	88, High Street			15 February 1979	TG0290843871; 52°57′14″N 1°01′09″E		1039464	Upload Photo	Q26291256
90-94, High Street	II	90-94, High Street			15 February 1979	TG0291543865; 52°57′14″N 1°01′09″E		1039465	Upload Photo	Q26291257
93 and 95, High Street	II	93 and 95, High Street			15 February 1979	TG0289043936; 52°57′16″N 1°01′08″E		1373952	Upload Photo	Q26654867
Alma Cottage Beacon Cottage	II	98, High Street			15 February 1979	TG0293643830; 52°57′12″N 1°01′10″E		1039467	Upload Photo	Q26291260
100 and 102, High Street	II	100 and 102, High Street			15 February 1979	TG0294443819; 52°57′12″N 1°01′11″E		1373985	Upload Photo	Q26654900
101, High Street	II	101, High Street, NR25 7PS			15 February 1979	TG0293943883; 52°57′14″N 1°01′11″E		1039477	Upload Photo	Q26291270
103-107, High Street	II	103-107, High Street			15 February 1979	TG0293243871; 52°57′14″N 1°01′10″E		1306214	Upload Photo	Q26593015
109, High Street	II	109, High Street			15 February 1979	TG0293843858; 52°57′13″N 1°01′10″E		1373953	Upload Photo	Q26654868
The Wheel House	II	112, High Street			15 February 1979	TG0300043765; 52°57′10″N 1°01′14″E		1039469	Upload Photo	Q26291262
113, High Street	II	113, High Street, NR25 7PS			15 February 1979	TG0295043842; 52°57′13″N 1°01′11″E		1170099	Upload Photo	Q26463399
Findhorn Cottage	II	119, High Street			15 February 1979	TG0295443825; 52°57′12″N 1°01′11″E		1039478	Upload Photo	Q26291272
124-130, High Street	II	124-130, High Street			15 February 1979	TG0301543749; 52°57′10″N 1°01′14″E		1169945	Upload Photo	Q26463153
127-131, High Street	II	127-131, High Street			15 February 1979	TG0298043796; 52°57′11″N 1°01′13″E		1170103	Upload Photo	Q26463409
132 and 134, High Street	II	132 and 134, High Street			15 February 1979	TG0302943739; 52°57′09″N 1°01′15″E		1373986	Upload Photo	Q26654901
145 and 147, High Street	II	145 and 147, High Street			15 February 1979	TG0306143722; 52°57′09″N 1°01′17″E		1039479	Upload Photo	Q26291273
146 and 148, High Street	II	146 and 148, High Street			15 February 1979	TG0309243673; 52°57′07″N 1°01′18″E		1169950	Upload Photo	Q26463166
152 and 154, High Street	II	152 and 154, High Street			15 February 1979	TG0310843661; 52°57′07″N 1°01′19″E		1039470	Upload Photo	Q26291263
Claremount House	II	158, High Street			15 February 1979	TG0312043652; 52°57′06″N 1°01′20″E		1169957	Upload Photo	Q26463172
20a, High Street	II	20a, High Street			15 February 1979	TG0283643986; 52°57′18″N 1°01′05″E		1039499	Upload Photo	Q26291294
Benbow Cottage Ship Cottage	II	6b, High Street			15 February 1979	TG0282344010; 52°57′18″N 1°01′05″E		1039498	Upload Photo	Q26291293
Double Doors Cottage the Doll's House	II	High Street			15 February 1979	TG0281944042; 52°57′19″N 1°01′04″E		1169971	Upload Photo	Q26463191
Gateway Arch Between 84 and 88	II	High Street			15 February 1979	TG0290843881; 52°57′14″N 1°01′09″E		1039463	Upload Photo	Q26291255
Guildhall	II*	High Street	guild house		6 March 1959	TG0281944071; 52°57′20″N 1°01′05″E		1373987	Guildhall More images	Q4924615
Ice House Immediately North West of No 86	II	High Street			15 February 1979	TG0286643896; 52°57′15″N 1°01′07″E		1039462	Upload Photo	Q26291254
Ivy House	II	High Street			15 February 1979	TG0296643815; 52°57′12″N 1°01′12″E		1373954	Upload Photo	Q26654869
K6 Telephone Kiosk	II	High Street			20 July 1987	TG0292643855; 52°57′13″N 1°01′10″E		1049557	Upload Photo	Q26301582
Morgan Cottage	II	High Street			15 February 1979	TG0292243880; 52°57′14″N 1°01′10″E		1306242	Upload Photo	Q26593043
Providence House	II	High Street			15 February 1979	TG0295243805; 52°57′12″N 1°01′11″E		1039468	Upload Photo	Q26291261
The Little Regency	II	High Street			15 February 1979	TG0284743973; 52°57′17″N 1°01′06″E		1039501	Upload Photo	Q26291296
Wall and Gate Piers Along High Street Immediately South East of Nos 90 to 94 (even)	II	High Street			15 February 1979	TG0292543858; 52°57′13″N 1°01′10″E		1039466	Upload Photo	Q26291259
White Horse Public House	II	High Street			15 February 1979	TG0282044020; 52°57′19″N 1°01′04″E		1039497	White Horse Public House More images	Q26291292
Corner Cottage and 7 Mariner's Hill	II	High Street And, 7 Mariner's Hill			15 February 1979	TG0282144051; 52°57′20″N 1°01′05″E		1039471	Upload Photo	Q26291264
Blakeney War Memorial	II	Holt, NR25 7NZ	war memorial		14 December 2016	TG0300043601; 52°57′05″N 1°01′13″E		1440867	Blakeney War Memorial More images	Q66478242
Miranda	II	1, Little Lane			15 February 1979	TG0293043825; 52°57′12″N 1°01′10″E		1170110	Upload Photo	Q26463428
4, Mariner's Hill	II	4, Mariner's Hill			15 February 1979	TG0284644063; 52°57′20″N 1°01′06″E		1170135	Upload Photo	Q26463465
5, Mariner's Hill	II	5, Mariner's Hill			15 February 1979	TG0283644058; 52°57′20″N 1°01′05″E		1039481	Upload Photo	Q26291275
6, Mariner's Hill	II	6, Mariner's Hill			15 February 1979	TG0283144055; 52°57′20″N 1°01′05″E		1306201	Upload Photo	Q26593002
Caulking House the Counting House	II	Mariner's Hill			15 February 1979	TG0289744063; 52°57′20″N 1°01′09″E		1039480	Upload Photo	Q26291274
The Friary	II*	1 and 2, Mariners Hill			30 November 1951	TG0288244065; 52°57′20″N 1°01′08″E		1170123	Upload Photo	Q17556136
Hill House	II	New Road			15 February 1979	TG0312243630; 52°57′06″N 1°01′20″E		1039439	Upload Photo	Q26291231
Boundary Wall on North, South and West Sides of Garden to West of Manor Hotel	II	South And West Sides Of Garden To West Of Manor Hotel, The Quay			15 February 1979	TG0288844105; 52°57′21″N 1°01′08″E		1039442	Upload Photo	Q26291234
Red House	II*	9, The Quay	house		30 November 1951	TG0258444029; 52°57′19″N 1°00′52″E		1171139	Red House More images	Q17556164
Barn Annexe Immediately West of Blakeney Hotel	II	The Quay			30 November 1951	TG0271244048; 52°57′20″N 1°00′59″E		1039443	Upload Photo	Q26291235
Barn South East of Manor Hotel	II	The Quay			30 November 1951	TG0295144112; 52°57′21″N 1°01′12″E		1039441	Upload Photo	Q26291233
Boundary Wall from North West Corner of Quay Barn Westwards Along the Quay and Southwards Along Westgate Street	II	The Quay			15 February 1979	TG0260543985; 52°57′18″N 1°00′53″E		1039447	Upload Photo	Q26291239
Garden Wall and Gate Piers on Road Frontage to North of Quay House	II	The Quay			15 February 1979	TG0268244039; 52°57′20″N 1°00′57″E		1039445	Upload Photo	Q26291236
Manor Hotel	II	The Quay			30 November 1951	TG0292044123; 52°57′22″N 1°01′10″E		1039440	Upload Photo	Q26291232
Quay House	II*	The Quay, NR25 7NF			30 November 1951	TG0270243984; 52°57′18″N 1°00′58″E		1039444	Upload Photo	Q17555689
Range of Outbuildings North East of Quay Cottage. Wall on Road Frontage of Quay Cottage	II	The Quay			15 February 1979	TG0267544022; 52°57′19″N 1°00′57″E		1373974	Upload Photo	Q26654890
Quay Barn, Wall Fronting Road Adjoining North East Corner of Quay Barn	II	Wall Fronting Road Adjoining North East Corner Of Quay Barn, The Quay			15 February 1979	TG0263443989; 52°57′18″N 1°00′54″E		1039446	Upload Photo	Q26291238
Wall Enclosing Garden to West of the Friary, Wall Linking North End of the Friary with Building to East	II	Wall Linking North End Of The Friary With Building To East, Mariners Hill			15 February 1979	TG0286244063; 52°57′20″N 1°01′07″E		1373955	Upload Photo	Q26654870
6, Westgate Street	II	6, Westgate Street			30 April 1976	TG0258143942; 52°57′17″N 1°00′51″E		1039449	Upload Photo	Q26291241
10, Westgate Street	II	10, Westgate Street			15 February 1979	TG0258543925; 52°57′16″N 1°00′52″E		1373977	Upload Photo	Q26654893
11-15, Westgate Street	II	11-15, Westgate Street			15 February 1979	TG0261343904; 52°57′15″N 1°00′53″E		1039448	Upload Photo	Q26291240
Pimpernel Cottage	II	16, Westgate Street			15 February 1979	TG0258143910; 52°57′15″N 1°00′51″E		1171179	Upload Photo	Q26465017
Westview	II	18, Westgate Street			15 February 1979	TG0256043910; 52°57′15″N 1°00′50″E		1039450	Upload Photo	Q26291242
19, Westgate Street	II	19, Westgate Street			15 February 1979	TG0262443887; 52°57′15″N 1°00′54″E		1171155	Upload Photo	Q26464985
20, Westgate Street	II	20, Westgate Street			15 February 1979	TG0258343902; 52°57′15″N 1°00′52″E		1305696	Upload Photo	Q26592541
23, Westgate Street	II	23, Westgate Street			15 February 1979	TG0261343874; 52°57′14″N 1°00′53″E		1373976	Upload Photo	Q26654892
Kings Arms Inn	II	Westgate Street	pub		15 February 1979	TG0256643960; 52°57′17″N 1°00′51″E		1171160	Kings Arms Inn More images	Q26464990
Shipley House Including Garden Area Wall in Front (east)	II	Westgate Street			15 February 1979	TG0257543935; 52°57′16″N 1°00′51″E		1305723	Upload Photo	Q26592564
The Pightle	II	Westgate Street			15 February 1979	TG0259543927; 52°57′16″N 1°00′52″E		1373975	Upload Photo	Q26654891
Old Rectory	II*	6, Wiveton Road			30 November 1951	TG0315643435; 52°56′59″N 1°01′21″E		1373978	Upload Photo	Q17556955
Barn North West of No6 (old Rectory)	II	Wiveton Road			30 November 1951	TG0312743447; 52°57′00″N 1°01′20″E		1305702	Upload Photo	Q26592545
Blakeney Church of England Primary School, Boundary Walls, Gates and Associated Outbuildings	II	Wiveton Road, Holt, NR25 7NJ			23 February 2015	TG0322743574; 52°57′04″N 1°01′25″E		1423837	Upload Photo	Q26677056
School House	II	Wiveton Road			15 February 1979	TG0315743589; 52°57′04″N 1°01′22″E		1039451	Upload Photo	Q26291243

== See also ==
- Grade I listed buildings in Norfolk
- Grade II* listed buildings in Norfolk

== Sources ==
- Wilson, Bill; Pevsner, Nikolaus (1999) [1962], Norfolk 2: North-West and South, The Buildings of England, New Haven and London: Yale University Press, ISBN 978-0-300-09657-6
