= Listed buildings in Walsingham =

Non-Civil Parish in Norfolk, England

Walsingham is a village and civil parish in the North Norfolk district of Norfolk, England. It contains 87 listed buildings that are recorded in the National Heritage List for England. Of these seven are grade I, 22 are grade II* and 142 are grade II.

This list is based on the information retrieved online from Historic England.

== Key ==
Grade	Criteria
I	Buildings that are of exceptional interest
II*	Particularly important buildings of more than special interest
II	Buildings that are of special interest

== Listing ==
Name	Grade	Location	Type	Completed (Note: The date given is the date used by Historic England as significant for the initial building or that of an important part in the structure's description.)	Date designated	Grid ref. (Note: The grid reference is based on the British national grid reference system, sometimes known as OSGB36, used by the Ordnance Survey.) Geo-coordinates	Notes	Entry number (Note: The "List Entry Number" is a unique number assigned to each listed building and scheduled monument by Historic England.)	Image	Wikidata
Stables and Cart Sheds to South West Of, and Barn, Cart Shed and Coach House to West of No 12 (stonegate Farmhouse)	II	Egmere Road			30 November 1951	TF9332836966; 52°53′43″N 0°52′21″E		1171732	Upload Photo	Q26466092
Baverstock House	II	1, Bridewell Street			15 February 1979	TF9341236889; 52°53′41″N 0°52′26″E		1039379	Upload Photo	Q26291169
Nos 2 to 6 (even) Gates and Gate Piers to West	II	2-6, Bridewell Street			15 February 1979	TF9346036899; 52°53′41″N 0°52′28″E		1039382	Upload Photo	Q26291172
No 7 and Adjoining Barn	II	7, Bridewell Street			15 February 1979	TF9341836932; 52°53′42″N 0°52′26″E		1039380	Upload Photo	Q26291170
10, Bridewell Street	II	10, Bridewell Street			15 February 1979	TF9342836926; 52°53′42″N 0°52′27″E		1171636	Upload Photo	Q26465826
11, Bridewell Street	II	11, Bridewell Street			15 February 1979	TF9342036957; 52°53′43″N 0°52′26″E		1374024	Upload Photo	Q26654931
12-16, Bridewell Street	II	12-16, Bridewell Street			15 February 1979	TF9343136934; 52°53′42″N 0°52′27″E		1374025	Upload Photo	Q26654932
13, Bridewell Street	II	13, Bridewell Street			15 February 1979	TF9342236965; 52°53′43″N 0°52′26″E		1039381	Upload Photo	Q26291171
Todds Yard	II	18 and 20, Bridewell Street			15 February 1979	TF9344936933; 52°53′42″N 0°52′28″E		1171644	Upload Photo	Q26465849
Williamsons Furniture Store and Former Prison	II	Bridewell Street			9 May 1977	TF9337036906; 52°53′41″N 0°52′23″E		1039378	Upload Photo	Q26291168
Barn Approximately 70 M North East of Church of All Saints and St Peter	II	Church Road			15 February 1979	TF9392837604; 52°54′03″N 0°52′55″E		1171488	Upload Photo	Q26465495
Church of All Saints and St Peter	I	Church Road	church building		6 March 1959	TF9384937552; 52°54′02″N 0°52′50″E		1373997	Church of All Saints and St Peter More images	Q17537210
2 and 4, Church Street	II	2 and 4, Church Street			15 February 1979	TF9336536612; 52°53′32″N 0°52′23″E		1039383	Upload Photo	Q26291174
3, Church Street	II	3, Church Street			15 February 1979	TF9340436586; 52°53′31″N 0°52′25″E		1039384	Upload Photo	Q26291175
5 and 9, Church Street	II	5 and 9, Church Street			15 February 1979	TF9342036571; 52°53′30″N 0°52′25″E		1305480	Upload Photo	Q26592338
6, Church Street	II	6, Church Street			15 February 1979	TF9337436604; 52°53′32″N 0°52′23″E		1305515	Upload Photo	Q26592372
No 8 and Adjoining Stable	II	8, Church Street			15 February 1979	TF9339836573; 52°53′31″N 0°52′24″E		1374026	Upload Photo	Q26654933
Church House	II*	10, Church Street			30 November 1951	TF9346036492; 52°53′28″N 0°52′27″E		1171656	Upload Photo	Q17556205
Abbey Farmhouse and Attached Outbuildings Immediately to North and South	II	Church Street			15 February 1979	TF9353736405; 52°53′25″N 0°52′31″E		1374027	Upload Photo	Q26654934
Church of St Mary and All Saints	I	Church Street	church building		6 March 1959	TF9352836490; 52°53′28″N 0°52′31″E		1039385	Church of St Mary and All Saints More images	Q17536696
1, Common Place	II	1, Common Place			30 November 1951	TF9341836883; 52°53′41″N 0°52′26″E		1039386	Upload Photo	Q26291176
2, Common Place	II	2, Common Place			30 November 1951	TF9342736875; 52°53′40″N 0°52′26″E		1305488	Upload Photo	Q26592346
3, Common Place	II	3, Common Place			30 November 1951	TF9343536873; 52°53′40″N 0°52′27″E		1374028	Upload Photo	Q26654935
4, 5 and 6, Common Place	II	4, 5 and 6, Common Place, Little Walsingham, NR22 6BW			30 November 1951	TF9346536876; 52°53′40″N 0°52′28″E		1171687	Upload Photo	Q26465976
Bull Inn	II*	8, Common Place			30 November 1951	TF9347436856; 52°53′40″N 0°52′29″E		1039387	Upload Photo	Q17555669
9 and 10, Common Place	II*	9 and 10, Common Place			30 November 1951	TF9346636840; 52°53′39″N 0°52′28″E		1171703	Upload Photo	Q17556216
54, High Street (see Details for Further Address Information)	II*	12, Common Place			30 November 1951	TF9342436840; 52°53′39″N 0°52′26″E		1374029	Upload Photo	Q17556994
Shire Hall	II*	Common Place			30 November 1951	TF9344936835; 52°53′39″N 0°52′28″E		1039388	Upload Photo	Q17555673
Barn North West of Edgar House	II	Edgar Road			15 February 1979	TF9166738244; 52°54′27″N 0°50′55″E		1171490	Upload Photo	Q26465497
Edgar House	II	Edgar Road			15 February 1979	TF9169938189; 52°54′25″N 0°50′57″E		1039408	Upload Photo	Q26291198
Benincasa	II	2, Egmere Road			15 February 1979	TF9341536999; 52°53′44″N 0°52′26″E		1039389	Upload Photo	Q26291178
Southwell House	II	3, Egmere Road			15 February 1979	TF9339337008; 52°53′45″N 0°52′25″E		1171717	Upload Photo	Q26466050
Sideways	II	4, Egmere Road			15 February 1979	TF9338037014; 52°53′45″N 0°52′24″E		1374030	Upload Photo	Q26654937
Richeldis	II	6, 7 and 8, Egmere Road			15 February 1979	TF9336337011; 52°53′45″N 0°52′23″E		1171719	Upload Photo	Q26466057
Stonegate Farmhouse	II	12, Egmere Road			30 November 1951	TF9337036980; 52°53′44″N 0°52′24″E		1039390	Upload Photo	Q26291179
Egmere Farmhouse	II	Egmere Road			15 February 1979	TF9007737906; 52°54′18″N 0°49′30″E		1373998	Upload Photo	Q26654910
Mid 19 Century Cart House Cattle Sheds Stables Barn and Waggon Lodge (with Granary Over) to East of Egmere Farmhouse	II	Egmere Road			15 February 1979	TF9013037946; 52°54′19″N 0°49′33″E		1305563	Upload Photo	Q26592415
Robin Hood Public House	II	Egmere Road			15 February 1979	TF9342736999; 52°53′44″N 0°52′27″E		1305467	Upload Photo	Q26592325
Ruins of Church of St Edmund	II*	Egmere Road	church building		15 February 1979	TF8968037388; 52°54′02″N 0°49′07″E		1039409	Ruins of Church of St Edmund More images	Q17555679
Flint Boundary Wall Enclosing Remains of St Mary's Friary, Extending from Rear of No 6 Market Place to A Point Roughly Opposite the Rear of No 2 Church Street	I	Extending From Rear Of No 6 Market Place To A Point Roughly Opposite The Rear Of No 2 Church Street, Fakenham Road			15 February 1979	TF9323736554; 52°53′30″N 0°52′16″E		1039391	Upload Photo	Q17536702
Park Lodge	II	136, Fakenham Road			15 February 1979	TF9316535921; 52°53′10″N 0°52′10″E		1171743	Upload Photo	Q26466120
Remains of St Mary's Friary	I	Fakenham Road	monastery ruins		6 March 1959	TF9330036596; 52°53′31″N 0°52′19″E		1373991	Remains of St Mary's Friary More images	Q7963860
K6 Telephone Kiosk	II	Friday Market Place, Little Walsingham			20 July 1987	TF9335336704; 52°53′35″N 0°52′22″E		1172207	Upload Photo	Q26466909
Churchyard Boundary Wall West and North, Gate Piers and Gates West of Church of St Mary and All Saints	II	Gate Piers And Gates West Of Church Of St Mary And All Saints, Church Street			15 February 1979	TF9349936508; 52°53′28″N 0°52′30″E		1305486	Upload Photo	Q26592344
Guild House	II	1, Guild Street			15 February 1979	TF9343336964; 52°53′43″N 0°52′27″E		1039393	Upload Photo	Q26291181
2, Guild Street	II	2, Guild Street			15 February 1979	TF9344636999; 52°53′44″N 0°52′28″E		1039392	Upload Photo	Q26291180
4, Guild Street	II	4, Guild Street			30 November 1951	TF9346237012; 52°53′45″N 0°52′29″E		1171747	Upload Photo	Q26466133
6, Guild Street	II	6, Guild Street			15 February 1979	TF9349337028; 52°53′45″N 0°52′30″E		1373992	Upload Photo	Q26654906
7 and 8, Guild Street	II	7 and 8, Guild Street			15 February 1979	TF9349737031; 52°53′45″N 0°52′31″E		1171752	Upload Photo	Q26466150
About 25 Metres of Boundary Wall Immediately South of Nos 1 and 3	II	1 and 3, High Street			30 November 1951	TF9336436638; 52°53′33″N 0°52′23″E		1171761	Upload Photo	Q26466174
2 and 4, High Street	II	2 and 4, High Street			30 November 1951	TF9338336626; 52°53′32″N 0°52′24″E		1171872	Upload Photo	Q26466505
9 and 11, High Street	II	9 and 11, High Street			15 February 1979	TF9337436670; 52°53′34″N 0°52′23″E		1039394	Upload Photo	Q26291182
10, High Street	II	10, High Street			30 November 1951	TF9338736649; 52°53′33″N 0°52′24″E		1039365	Upload Photo	Q26291154
15, High Street	II	15, High Street			15 February 1979	TF9337236675; 52°53′34″N 0°52′23″E		1039354	Upload Photo	Q26291146
Dow House	II*	17, High Street			30 November 1951	TF9337336686; 52°53′34″N 0°52′23″E		1039355	Upload Photo	Q17555644
18, High Street	II	18, High Street			30 November 1951	TF9339336690; 52°53′34″N 0°52′24″E		1171878	Upload Photo	Q26466515
19, High Street	II*	19, High Street			6 March 1959	TF9337836695; 52°53′34″N 0°52′23″E		1039356	Upload Photo	Q17555645
20, High Street	II	20, High Street			30 November 1951	TF9339536699; 52°53′35″N 0°52′24″E		1374017	Upload Photo	Q26654927
21, High Street (see Details for Further Address Information)	II*	21, High Street			6 March 1959	TF9338136709; 52°53′35″N 0°52′24″E		1039357	Upload Photo	Q17555660
22 and 24, High Street	II	22 and 24, High Street			30 November 1951	TF9339836720; 52°53′35″N 0°52′25″E		1039366	Upload Photo	Q26291155
Oxford Stores Public House	II*	25, High Street			30 November 1951	TF9337836722; 52°53′35″N 0°52′24″E		1039358	Upload Photo	Q17555665
26 and 28, High Street	II	26 and 28, High Street			30 November 1951	TF9339936729; 52°53′36″N 0°52′25″E		1374018	Upload Photo	Q26654928
27, High Street	II	27, High Street			15 February 1979	TF9338636739; 52°53′36″N 0°52′24″E		1039359	Upload Photo	Q26291147
29, High Street	II	29, High Street			15 February 1979	TF9338936755; 52°53′36″N 0°52′24″E		1374013	Upload Photo	Q26654925
30, High Street	II	30, High Street			30 November 1951	TF9340236739; 52°53′36″N 0°52′25″E		1305389	Upload Photo	Q26592259
31, High Street	II	31, High Street			30 November 1951	TF9339136761; 52°53′37″N 0°52′24″E		1039360	Upload Photo	Q26291148
No 32 and Guild Shop	II	32, High Street			30 November 1951	TF9340436748; 52°53′36″N 0°52′25″E		1039367	Upload Photo	Q26291156
33, High Street	II*	33, High Street			30 November 1951	TF9339236780; 52°53′37″N 0°52′24″E		1374014	Upload Photo	Q17556978
34 and 36, High Street	II	34 and 36, High Street			15 February 1979	TF9342736760; 52°53′37″N 0°52′26″E		1305360	Upload Photo	Q26592233
38-42, High Street	II	38-42, High Street			15 February 1979	TF9340636768; 52°53′37″N 0°52′25″E		1039368	Upload Photo	Q26291157
The Convent	II	39, High Street			15 February 1979	TF9335336798; 52°53′38″N 0°52′22″E		1039361	Upload Photo	Q26291149
Falcon House	II	43 and 45, High Street			15 February 1979	TF9339736791; 52°53′38″N 0°52′25″E		1305402	Upload Photo	Q26592270
44 and 46, High Street	II	44 and 46, High Street			15 February 1979	TF9341036786; 52°53′37″N 0°52′25″E		1171920	Upload Photo	Q26466578
47, High Street	II	47, High Street			15 February 1979	TF9339836805; 52°53′38″N 0°52′25″E		1039362	Upload Photo	Q26291150
48, High Street	II*	48, High Street			30 November 1951	TF9341936817; 52°53′38″N 0°52′26″E		1305347	Upload Photo	Q17556361
Maytyr House	II*	49, High Street			30 November 1951	TF9340036814; 52°53′38″N 0°52′25″E		1374015	Upload Photo	Q17556982
50, High Street	II*	50, High Street			30 November 1951	TF9341936827; 52°53′39″N 0°52′26″E		1374021	Upload Photo	Q17556984
51, High Street	II	51, High Street			15 February 1979	TF9340336823; 52°53′39″N 0°52′25″E		1305405	Upload Photo	Q26592272
52, High Street	II*	52, High Street			30 November 1951	TF9342136834; 52°53′39″N 0°52′26″E		1171980	Upload Photo	Q17556242
53, High Street	II	53, High Street			25 May 1975	TF9340436830; 52°53′39″N 0°52′25″E		1039363	Upload Photo	Q26291151
55, High Street	II	55, High Street			27 May 1975	TF9340436838; 52°53′39″N 0°52′25″E		1374016	Upload Photo	Q26654926
57 and 59, High Street	II	57 and 59, High Street			27 May 1975	TF9340636846; 52°53′39″N 0°52′25″E		1171865	Upload Photo	Q26466486
61 and 63, High Street	II	61 and 63, High Street			27 May 1975	TF9340536864; 52°53′40″N 0°52′25″E		1039364	Upload Photo	Q26291153
47a, High Street	II	47a, High Street			15 February 1979	TF9338836805; 52°53′38″N 0°52′24″E		1171833	Upload Photo	Q26466383
Bridge Over River Stiffkey South East of the Abbey	II	High Street			15 February 1979	TF9354636604; 52°53′31″N 0°52′32″E		1374020	Upload Photo	Q26654929
Methodist Chapel	II*	High Street	chapel		14 March 1977	TF9334136642; 52°53′33″N 0°52′21″E		1373993	Methodist Chapel More images	Q17556965
Pack Horse Bridge North East of the Abbey in Abbey Grounds	II	High Street	packhorse bridge		15 February 1979	TF9362636824; 52°53′38″N 0°52′37″E		1039370	Pack Horse Bridge North East of the Abbey in Abbey Grounds More images	Q26291158
Post Office	II	High Street			15 February 1979	TF9339736717; 52°53′35″N 0°52′25″E		1171884	Upload Photo	Q26466521
Remains of St Marys Priory	I	High Street	abbey		30 November 1951	TF9354736777; 52°53′37″N 0°52′33″E		1171928	Remains of St Marys Priory More images	Q7963862
The Abbey	I	High Street	architectural structure		30 November 1951	TF9350836732; 52°53′36″N 0°52′30″E		1039369	The Abbey More images	Q17536690
The Abbey Boundary Wall South West of the Abbey Along Church Street Between No3 Church Street and No 2 High Street	II	High Street			15 February 1979	TF9338736604; 52°53′32″N 0°52′24″E		1039371	Upload Photo	Q26291159
The Priory Gatehouse (or Abbey) Gatehouse Wall Adjoining Priory Gatehouse to South, Fronting High Street	I	High Street	gatehouse		30 November 1951	TF9341136811; 52°53′38″N 0°52′25″E		1374019	The Priory Gatehouse (or Abbey) Gatehouse Wall Adjoining Priory Gatehouse to South, Fronting High Street More images	Q17537216
Foundary Cottage	II	1-5, Hindringham Road			15 February 1979	TF9448637619; 52°54′03″N 0°53′25″E		1171541	Upload Photo	Q26465566
St Bernard's Cottage	II	6, Hindringham Road			15 February 1979	TF9445437602; 52°54′02″N 0°53′23″E		1171518	Upload Photo	Q26465527
14, Hindringham Road	II	14, Hindringham Road			30 November 1951	TF9450437594; 52°54′02″N 0°53′26″E		1039413	Upload Photo	Q26291202
Windmill Hill	II	18, Hindringham Road			15 February 1979	TF9453737592; 52°54′02″N 0°53′27″E		1171535	Upload Photo	Q26465553
Barn and Cart Shed Adjoining East of No 18	II	Hindringham Road			15 February 1979	TF9455137569; 52°54′01″N 0°53′28″E		1374001	Upload Photo	Q26654913
Hill Cottage, 2a, Hindringham Road (see Details for Further Address Information)	II	2a, Hindringham Road			15 February 1979	TF9443737605; 52°54′03″N 0°53′22″E		1374000	Upload Photo	Q26654912
Josephs Cottage	II	Hindringham Road, Great Walsingham			15 February 1979	TF9443237605; 52°54′03″N 0°53′22″E		1171505	Upload Photo	Q26465512
Premises Occupied by C Bacon and Sons (blacksmiths)	II	Hindringham Road			15 February 1979	TF9447037599; 52°54′02″N 0°53′24″E		1039412	Upload Photo	Q26291201
Premises Occupied by Half Moon Antiques	II	Hindringham Road			15 February 1979	TF9449437595; 52°54′02″N 0°53′25″E		1171529	Upload Photo	Q26465540
The Barge and Caravel	II	Hindringham Road			15 February 1979	TF9457337577; 52°54′01″N 0°53′29″E		1039414	Upload Photo	Q26291203
The Abbey Boundary Wall to North Between No 8 Common Place and Sunk Road, and Wall to North East at Rear of Nos 8,9 and 10 Common Place	II	Holt Road			15 February 1979	TF9352736861; 52°53′40″N 0°52′32″E		1172011	Upload Photo	Q26466694
Boundary Wall Immediately East of the Hospice	II	Holt Road			15 February 1979	TF9353936866; 52°53′40″N 0°52′32″E		1172002	Upload Photo	Q26466682
Pilgrim Hall	II	Holt Road			15 February 1979	TF9354436924; 52°53′42″N 0°52′33″E		1374022	Upload Photo	Q26654930
The Hospice	II	Holt Road			30 November 1951	TF9351036874; 52°53′40″N 0°52′31″E		1039372	Upload Photo	Q26291160
Little Walsingham War Memorial	II	Junction Of Wells Road And Knight Street, Little Walsingham, NR22 6BU	war memorial		30 August 2019	TF9351037026; 52°53′45″N 0°52′31″E		1465658	Little Walsingham War Memorial More images	Q97324745
4, Knight Street	II	4, Knight Street			15 February 1979	TF9359236905; 52°53′41″N 0°52′35″E		1049539	Upload Photo	Q26301564
6, Knight Street	II	6, Knight Street			30 November 1951	TF9358836917; 52°53′41″N 0°52′35″E		1049540	Upload Photo	Q26301565
8, Knight Street	II	8, Knight Street			15 February 1979	TF9356736956; 52°53′43″N 0°52′34″E		1373649	Upload Photo	Q26654604
10, Knight Street	II	10, Knight Street			15 February 1979	TF9356236960; 52°53′43″N 0°52′34″E		1049541	Upload Photo	Q26301566
12 and 16, Knight Street	II	12 and 16, Knight Street			15 February 1979	TF9356036967; 52°53′43″N 0°52′34″E		1373650	Upload Photo	Q26654605
18 and 20, Knight Street	II	18 and 20, Knight Street			15 February 1979	TF9355836976; 52°53′43″N 0°52′34″E		1049542	Upload Photo	Q26301567
22-26, Knight Street	II	22-26, Knight Street			15 February 1979	TF9355036989; 52°53′44″N 0°52′33″E		1373651	Upload Photo	Q26654606
28 and 30, Knight Street	II	28 and 30, Knight Street			15 February 1979	TF9356137020; 52°53′45″N 0°52′34″E		1049543	Upload Photo	Q26301568
32a, Knight Street	II	32a, Knight Street			15 February 1979	TF9353637017; 52°53′45″N 0°52′33″E		1049544	Upload Photo	Q26301569
Barn Immediately North of North Wing to the College of Clergy	II	Knight Street			30 November 1951	TF9355036959; 52°53′43″N 0°52′33″E		1049546	Upload Photo	Q26301571
Bursars Cottage at the College of Clergy	II	Knight Street			30 November 1951	TF9356736930; 52°53′42″N 0°52′34″E		1305284	Upload Photo	Q26592172
Cottage Annexe Adjoining No 2 to North East (now Part of No2) the Knights Gate Hotel and Retaurant	II	Knight Street			30 November 1951	TF9360236892; 52°53′41″N 0°52′36″E		1039373	Upload Photo	Q26291161
Gate Piers at South End of Wall St Annes at the College of Clergy Wall Immediately North Along Knight Street and Memorial Square to Stables	II	Knight Street			30 November 1951	TF9353436982; 52°53′44″N 0°52′32″E		1049547	Upload Photo	Q26301572
Kitchen and Refectory at the College of Clergy	II*	Knight Street			30 November 1951	TF9356236938; 52°53′42″N 0°52′34″E		1373613	Upload Photo	Q17556839
North Wing to the College of Clergy	II	Knight Street			30 November 1951	TF9355636948; 52°53′42″N 0°52′34″E		1305290	Upload Photo	Q26592177
St Augustines at the College of Clergy	II*	Knight Street			30 November 1951	TF9357636910; 52°53′41″N 0°52′34″E		1373612	Upload Photo	Q17556811
Wall Adjoining South of St Augustine's	II	Knight Street			15 February 1979	TF9358036890; 52°53′41″N 0°52′35″E		1049545	Upload Photo	Q26301570
The College of Clergy	II	21, Knight Street # (w Sd)			30 November 1951	TF9354236970; 52°53′43″N 0°52′33″E		1172108	Upload Photo	Q26466810
1, Market Place	II	1, Market Place			15 February 1979	TF9336236651; 52°53′33″N 0°52′23″E		1172143	Upload Photo	Q26466845
Homelea	II	2, Market Place			15 February 1979	TF9336236660; 52°53′33″N 0°52′23″E		1373614	Upload Photo	Q26654579
Ave Maria	II	3, Market Place			15 February 1979	TF9335536667; 52°53′34″N 0°52′22″E		1049548	Upload Photo	Q26301573
St Michaels	II	4, Market Place			15 February 1979	TF9334736668; 52°53′34″N 0°52′22″E		1172149	Upload Photo	Q26466852
6, Market Place	II	6, Market Place			15 February 1979	TF9333036658; 52°53′33″N 0°52′21″E		1373615	Upload Photo	Q26654580
Friday Cottage	II	7, Market Place			15 February 1979	TF9333436672; 52°53′34″N 0°52′21″E		1172151	Upload Photo	Q26466854
Elmham House	II*	8 and 9, Market Place	house		30 November 1951	TF9334036694; 52°53′35″N 0°52′21″E		1373616	Elmham House More images	Q17556844
Black Lion Hotel	II*	10, Market Place	hotel		30 November 1951	TF9334936734; 52°53′36″N 0°52′22″E		1049549	Black Lion Hotel More images	Q17555932
13, Market Place	II	13, Market Place			15 February 1979	TF9337136715; 52°53′35″N 0°52′23″E		1305242	Upload Photo	Q26592135
14-16, Market Place	II	14-16, Market Place			15 February 1979	TF9337136704; 52°53′35″N 0°52′23″E		1049550	Upload Photo	Q26301574
17, Market Place	II	17, Market Place			15 February 1979	TF9336936687; 52°53′34″N 0°52′23″E		1373618	Upload Photo	Q26654582
Aelred House	II	Market Place			30 November 1951	TF9337036743; 52°53′36″N 0°52′23″E		1172163	Upload Photo	Q26466868
Garage and Store to No 25 High Street (oxford Stores Public House)	II	Market Place			15 February 1979	TF9336636727; 52°53′36″N 0°52′23″E		1373617	Upload Photo	Q26654581
Parish Hall	II	Market Place			15 February 1979	TF9334436705; 52°53′35″N 0°52′22″E		1172153	Upload Photo	Q26466856
1 and 2, Mill Lane	II	1 and 2, Mill Lane			15 February 1979	TF9438737516; 52°54′00″N 0°53′19″E		1374002	Upload Photo	Q26654914
Eastgate House	II	Scarboro Road			15 February 1979	TF9434637431; 52°53′57″N 0°53′17″E		1039415	Upload Photo	Q26291205
Mill House	II	Scarboro Road			15 February 1979	TF9437437498; 52°53′59″N 0°53′18″E		1171552	Upload Photo	Q26465585
The Old Vicarage	II	Scarboro Road			15 February 1979	TF9386136950; 52°53′42″N 0°52′50″E		1172184	Upload Photo	Q26466885
Tollbar	II	60, Snoring Road			15 February 1979	TF9400336614; 52°53′31″N 0°52′57″E		1049551	Upload Photo	Q26301576
Bridge and Lodge Over Path Linking Lodge Plantation with the Abbey Grounds	II	Sunk Road			15 February 1979	TF9375736705; 52°53′34″N 0°52′44″E		1049553	Upload Photo	Q26301578
Gardens House (estate Number 137)	II	Sunk Road			15 February 1979	TF9377036038; 52°53′13″N 0°52′43″E		1172189	Upload Photo	Q26466891
Gate Piers and Gates at South East Entrance to the Abbey	II	Sunk Road			15 February 1979	TF9360436536; 52°53′29″N 0°52′35″E		1305254	Upload Photo	Q26592147
Kitchen Garden Walls Immediately to North West of Gardens House	II	Sunk Road			15 February 1979	TF9369336033; 52°53′13″N 0°52′39″E		1049552	Upload Photo	Q26301577
Barn to West of Nos 55 to 59 (odd) High Street	II	Swan Entry			15 February 1979	TF9338436851; 52°53′40″N 0°52′24″E		1172197	Upload Photo	Q26466898
Great Walsingham War Memorial	II	The Churchyard, St Peters Road, Great Walsingham, NR22 6DW	war memorial		26 January 2018	TF9390537570; 52°54′02″N 0°52′53″E		1452691	Great Walsingham War Memorial More images	Q59771404
K6 Telephone Kiosk	II	The Green, Great Walsingham			2 August 1990	TF9438437598; 52°54′02″N 0°53′19″E		1049518	Upload Photo	Q26301544
3, the Hill	II	3, The Hill			15 February 1979	TF9441237598; 52°54′02″N 0°53′21″E		1305566	Upload Photo	Q26592418
4, the Hill	II	4, The Hill			15 February 1979	TF9440537591; 52°54′02″N 0°53′20″E		1039410	Upload Photo	Q26291199
14-16, the Hill	II	14-16, The Hill			15 February 1979	TF9441937641; 52°54′04″N 0°53′21″E		1373999	Upload Photo	Q26654911
St Margaret's Cottage	II	18 and 19, The Hill			15 February 1979	TF9443637632; 52°54′03″N 0°53′22″E		1039411	Upload Photo	Q26291200
Hill Cottage	II	The Hill			15 February 1979	TF9443737589; 52°54′02″N 0°53′22″E		1171500	Upload Photo	Q26465508
Hill House	II	Thursford Road			15 February 1979	TF9501135847; 52°53′05″N 0°53′49″E		1049554	Upload Photo	Q26301579
Cleaves House	II	1-8, Wells Road			15 February 1979	TF9351437155; 52°53′49″N 0°52′32″E		1049556	Upload Photo	Q26301581
2, Wells Road	II	2, Wells Road			15 February 1979	TF9352537049; 52°53′46″N 0°52′32″E		1049555	Upload Photo	Q26301580
11, Wells Road	II	11, Wells Road			15 February 1979	TF9350137077; 52°53′47″N 0°52′31″E		1172205	Upload Photo	Q26466907
Stables Immediately South of No 2	II	Wells Road			15 February 1979	TF9353137028; 52°53′45″N 0°52′32″E		1172200	Upload Photo	Q26466902
3 and 4, Westgate	II	3 and 4, Westgate			15 February 1979	TF9402237676; 52°54′05″N 0°53′00″E		1039375	Upload Photo	Q26291165
No 5 Adjoining Stables to North East	II	5, Westgate			15 February 1979	TF9406237672; 52°54′05″N 0°53′02″E		1039416	Upload Photo	Q26291206
Model Farmhouse	II	12, Westgate			15 February 1979	TF9395837865; 52°54′12″N 0°52′57″E		1039376	Upload Photo	Q26291166
19, Westgate	II	19, Westgate			15 February 1979	TF9377637898; 52°54′13″N 0°52′47″E		1039377	Upload Photo	Q26291167
About 40 Metres of Wall Extending Westwards and About 45 Metres of Wall Extending Southwards from South West Corner of Berry Hall. About 55 Metres of Wall Extending Eastwards and Southwards from South East Corner of Berry Hall	II	Westgate			15 February 1979	TF9405037647; 52°54′04″N 0°53′01″E		1305518	Upload Photo	Q26592375
Berry Hall	II*	Westgate			30 November 1951	TF9409737659; 52°54′05″N 0°53′04″E		1374003	Upload Photo	Q17556971
Garden Boundary Wall North of Berry Hall	II	Westgate			15 February 1979	TF9412737680; 52°54′05″N 0°53′06″E		1039417	Upload Photo	Q26291207
Ruins of All Saints and St Marys Church	II	Westgate			6 March 1959	TF9394637771; 52°54′09″N 0°52′56″E		1039374	Upload Photo	Q26291163
St Barbara Cottage	II	Westgate			15 February 1979	TF9434137581; 52°54′02″N 0°53′17″E		1305552	Upload Photo	Q26592406
The Manor House	II*	Westgate			30 November 1951	TF9397837674; 52°54′05″N 0°52′58″E		1374023	Upload Photo	Q17556988

== See also ==
- Grade I listed buildings in Norfolk
- Grade II* listed buildings in Norfolk

== Sources ==
- Wilson, Bill; Pevsner, Nikolaus (1999) [1962], Norfolk 2: North-West and South, The Buildings of England, New Haven and London: Yale University Press, ISBN 978-0-300-09657-6
