= Listed buildings in Raynham, Norfolk =

Non-Civil Parish in Norfolk, England

Raynham is a village and civil parish in the North Norfolk district of Norfolk, England. It contains 40 listed buildings that are recorded in the National Heritage List for England. Of these two are grade I, two are grade II* and 36 are grade II.

This list is based on the information retrieved online from Historic England.

== Key ==
Grade	Criteria
I	Buildings that are of exceptional interest
II*	Particularly important buildings of more than special interest
II	Buildings that are of special interest

== Listing ==
Name	Grade	Location	Type	Completed (Note: The date given is the date used by Historic England as significant for the initial building or that of an important part in the structure's description.)	Date designated	Grid ref. (Note: The grid reference is based on the British national grid reference system, sometimes known as OSGB36, used by the Ordnance Survey.) Geo-coordinates	Notes	Entry number (Note: The "List Entry Number" is a unique number assigned to each listed building and scheduled monument by Historic England.)	Image	Wikidata
21 and 22 East Raynham	II	21 and 22 East Raynham, East Raynham			24 January 1984	TF8795525458; 52°47′38″N 0°47′10″E		1049274	Upload Photo	Q26301312
Raynham Hall Entrance Gates and Piers	II	East Raynham			24 January 1984	TF8816125727; 52°47′47″N 0°47′22″E		1172379	Upload Photo	Q26467098
Service Wing Raynham Hall	I	East Raynham			24 January 1984	TF8816825792; 52°47′49″N 0°47′22″E		1305177	Upload Photo	Q122732052
11 and 12, Fakenham Road	II	11 and 12, Fakenham Road, East Raynham			24 January 1984	TF8883325500; 52°47′38″N 0°47′57″E		1373757	Upload Photo	Q26654692
East Raynham House	II	Fakenham Road, East Raynham			24 January 1984	TF8890525572; 52°47′41″N 0°48′01″E		1049269	Upload Photo	Q26301308
Hall Farmhouse	II	Fakenham Road, East Raynham			24 January 1984	TF8896625615; 52°47′42″N 0°48′05″E		1172274	Upload Photo	Q26466971
The Lodge	II	Fakenham Road, East Raynham			24 January 1984	TF8880725410; 52°47′36″N 0°47′56″E		1172226	Upload Photo	Q26466926
Home Farmhouse	II	Hollow Lane, West Raynham			24 January 1984	TF8712825020; 52°47′25″N 0°46′25″E		1172534	Upload Photo	Q26467284
Raynham Hall, North East Service Wing and Wall	I	North East Service Wing And Wall, East Raynham	English country house		30 November 1951	TF8821125755; 52°47′47″N 0°47′25″E		1049270	Raynham Hall, North East Service Wing and Wall More images	Q1450806
Very Heavy Bomber Control Tower	II	Raf West Raynham			13 June 2012	TF8472724542; 52°47′13″N 0°44′16″E		1407941	Upload Photo	Q26675967
The Armoury and Blast Walls at Former Raf West Raynham	II	Raynham Business Park, West Raynham, Fakeham, NR21 7DG			17 March 2023	TF8455024810; 52°47′21″N 0°44′07″E		1483925	Upload Photo	Q122214062
Water Tower, Raynham Hall	II	Raynham Hall, East Raynham			24 January 1984	TF8814625825; 52°47′50″N 0°47′21″E		1049271	Upload Photo	Q26301309
23,25,28, Raynham Park	II	23, 25, 28, Raynham Park, East Raynham			24 January 1984	TF8784725636; 52°47′44″N 0°47′05″E		1049273	Upload Photo	Q26301311
Church of St Mary	II*	Raynham Park, East Raynham	church building		6 March 1959	TF8797025540; 52°47′41″N 0°47′11″E		1172454	Church of St Mary More images	Q17556259
East Raynham War Memorial	II	Raynham Park, East Raynham, NR21 7EF			2 August 2017	TF8794725516; 52°47′40″N 0°47′10″E		1447855	Upload Photo	Q66478854
Raynham Old Hall	II	Raynham Park, East Raynham			30 November 1951	TF8781125657; 52°47′45″N 0°47′03″E		1049272	Upload Photo	Q26301310
Stables and Barn Raynham Old Hall	II	Raynham Park, East Raynham			30 November 1951	TF8784225704; 52°47′46″N 0°47′05″E		1172427	Upload Photo	Q26467144
Church of St Martin	II*	South Raynham	church building		6 March 1959	TF8808324328; 52°47′02″N 0°47′15″E		1049275	Church of St Martin More images	Q17555815
South Raynham Grange	II	South Raynham			24 January 1984	TF8805424302; 52°47′01″N 0°47′13″E		1305119	Upload Photo	Q26592021
Old Rectory	II	South Raynham Road			24 January 1984	TF8740625187; 52°47′30″N 0°46′40″E		1172623	Upload Photo	Q26467391
11,12,13, the Street	II	11, 12, 13, The Street, West Raynham			24 January 1984	TF8725525288; 52°47′34″N 0°46′33″E		1049278	Upload Photo	Q26301315
24-28, the Street	II	24-28, The Street, West Raynham			24 January 1984	TF8724025348; 52°47′36″N 0°46′32″E		1373759	Upload Photo	Q26654694
Church of St Margaret	II	The Street, West Raynham	church building		24 January 1984	TF8725425417; 52°47′38″N 0°46′33″E		1049279	Church of St Margaret More images	Q26301316
Elaborately Coped Wall to Former Greyhound Public House and St Margarets Church	II	The Street, West Raynham			26 October 2004	TF8722625372; 52°47′36″N 0°46′31″E		1390487	Upload Photo	Q26669881
Foundry House	II	The Street, West Raynham			24 January 1984	TF8727325335; 52°47′35″N 0°46′34″E		1305055	Upload Photo	Q26591964
Hillside	II	The Street, West Raynham			24 January 1984	TF8730225259; 52°47′33″N 0°46′35″E		1049277	Upload Photo	Q26301314
The Post Office	II	The Street, West Raynham			24 January 1984	TF8724725309; 52°47′34″N 0°46′32″E		1172572	Upload Photo	Q26467320
Parachute Store at Former Raf West Raynham	II	Building 19, West Raynham Business Park, West Raynham, Fakenham, NR21 7PA			17 March 2023	TF8444924751; 52°47′20″N 0°44′02″E		1484466	Upload Photo	Q122214063
Hangar 1 at Former Raf West Raynham	II	West Raynham Business Park, West Raynham, Fakeham, NR21 7PA			17 March 2023	TF8444224578; 52°47′14″N 0°44′01″E		1483910	Upload Photo	Q122214065
Hangar 2 at Former Raf West Raynham	II	West Raynham Business Park, West Raynham, Fakenham, NR21 7PA			17 March 2023	TF8447624726; 52°47′19″N 0°44′03″E		1483965	Upload Photo	Q122214066
Hangar 3 at Former Raf West Raynham	II	West Raynham Business Park, West Raynham, Fakenham, NR21 7PA			17 March 2023	TF8465424859; 52°47′23″N 0°44′13″E		1483966	Upload Photo	Q122214067
Hangar 4 at Former Raf West Raynham	II	West Raynham Business Park, West Raynham, Fakenham, NR21 7PA			17 March 2023	TF8479024926; 52°47′25″N 0°44′20″E		1483967	Upload Photo	Q122214068
Ready Use Pyrotechnic Store (building 64) Immediately to the North-west of Hangar 2 at Former Raf West Raynham	II	West Raynham Business Park, West Raynham, Fakenham, NR21 7PA			17 March 2023	TF8445324711; 52°47′18″N 0°44′02″E		1483857	Upload Photo	Q122214069
Ready Use Pyrotechnic Store (building 77) Immediately to the North-west of Hangar 3 at Former Raf West Raynham	II	West Raynham Business Park, West Raynham, Fakenham, NR21 7PA			17 March 2023	TF8461224876; 52°47′24″N 0°44′11″E		1483858	Upload Photo	Q122214070
Watch Office (building 72) at Former Raf West Raynham	II	West Raynham Business Park, West Raynham, Fakenham, NR21 7PA			16 March 2023	TF8461724751; 52°47′19″N 0°44′11″E		1483853	Upload Photo	Q122214061
7,8,9,10, West Raynham Road	II	7, 8, 9, 10, West Raynham Road, South Raynham			24 January 1984	TF8795523793; 52°46′44″N 0°47′07″E		1172513	Upload Photo	Q26467264
Vere Lodge	II	West Raynham Road			24 January 1984	TF8786224237; 52°46′59″N 0°47′03″E		1049276	Upload Photo	Q26301313

== See also ==
- Grade I listed buildings in Norfolk
- Grade II* listed buildings in Norfolk

== Sources ==
- Wilson, Bill; Pevsner, Nikolaus (1999) [1962], Norfolk 2: North-West and South, The Buildings of England, New Haven and London: Yale University Press, ISBN 978-0-300-09657-6
