= Listed buildings in Cromer =

Non-Civil Parish in Norfolk, England

Cromer is a town and civil parish in the North Norfolk district of Norfolk, England. It contains 90 listed buildings that are recorded in the National Heritage List for England. Of these one is grade I, one is grade II* and 88 are grade II.

This list is based on the information retrieved online from Historic England.

== Key ==
| Grade | Criteria |
|---|---|
| I | Buildings that are of exceptional interest |
| II* | Particularly important buildings of more than special interest |
| II | Buildings that are of special interest |

== Listing ==
| Name | Grade | Location | Type | Completed (Note: The date given is the date used by Historic England as significant for the initial building or that of an important part in the structure's description.) | Date designated | Grid ref. (Note: The grid reference is based on the British national grid reference system, sometimes known as OSGB36, used by the Ordnance Survey.) Geo-coordinates | Notes | Entry number (Note: The "List Entry Number" is a unique number assigned to each listed building and scheduled monument by Historic England.) | Image | Wikidata |
|---|---|---|---|---|---|---|---|---|---|---|
| St Bennet's and Boundary Wall to North, 37 Vicarage Road, Cromer | II | 37 Vicarage Road, NR27 9DQ | | | 10 July 2012 | TG2194441860; 52°55′42″N 1°18′02″E | | 1408489 | Upload Photo | Q26676011 |
| Chapel Street | II | | | | 21 January 1977 | TG2179042142; 52°55′51″N 1°17′55″E | | 1373881 | Upload Photo | Q26654796 |
| Chapel at Cromer Old Cemetery | II | NR27 9EB | | | 18 August 2020 | TG2119841959; 52°55′46″N 1°17′23″E | | 1471821 | Upload Photo | Q98596475 |
| Cromer Baptist Church | II | NR27 9ES | Protestant church building | | 21 January 1977 | TG2206342137; 52°55′50″N 1°18′09″E | | 1049030 | Cromer Baptist Church More images | Q26301087 |
| Cromer Methodist Church and Church Hall Including Boundary Walls, Piers and Gate Piers to West Street and Holt Road | II | NR27 9DT | architectural structure | | 20 April 2016 | TG2158842048; 52°55′48″N 1°17′44″E | | 1433861 | Cromer Methodist Church and Church Hall Including Boundary Walls, Piers and Gate Piers to West Street and Holt Road More images | Q26677980 |
| Jetty Cliff and Bastion Including Sloping Pedestrian Pathways | II | | | | 16 June 2003 | TG2192342331; 52°55′57″N 1°18′02″E | | 1350362 | Upload Photo | Q26633574 |
| Sea Wall Defences Including Promenade and Cliff Retaining Walls from Opposite the Bottom of Melbourne Slope to the Gangway | II | | | | 16 June 2003 | TG2190842350; 52°55′58″N 1°18′02″E | | 1350361 | Upload Photo | Q26633573 |
| The Gangway and Retaining Walls | II | | | | 16 June 2003 | TG2211742182; 52°55′52″N 1°18′12″E | | 1350363 | Upload Photo | Q26633575 |
| Wenduyne | II | 2, 4, Brook Street | | | 21 January 1977 | TG2203742209; 52°55′53″N 1°18′08″E | | 1049023 | Upload Photo | Q26301079 |
| 6, Brook Street | II | 6, Brook Street | | | 21 January 1977 | TG2203542200; 52°55′53″N 1°18′08″E | | 1373879 | Upload Photo | Q26654794 |
| 10,12, Brook Street | II | 10, 12, Brook Street | | | 21 January 1977 | TG2203242175; 52°55′52″N 1°18′08″E | | 1049024 | Upload Photo | Q26301080 |
| 18, Brook Street | II | 18, Brook Street | | | 21 January 1977 | TG2202742156; 52°55′51″N 1°18′07″E | | 1049025 | Upload Photo | Q26301082 |
| 2,4, Chapel Street | II | 2, 4, Chapel Street | | | 21 January 1977 | TG2179642156; 52°55′51″N 1°17′55″E | | 1049026 | Upload Photo | Q26301083 |
| 5-9, Chapel Street | II | 5-9, Chapel Street | | | 21 January 1977 | TG2180542150; 52°55′51″N 1°17′56″E | | 1373880 | Upload Photo | Q26654795 |
| 1-4 and 4a, Chesterfield Villas | II | 1-4 and 4a, Chesterfield Villas, West Street, NR27 9EW | | | 24 May 1993 | TG2156642080; 52°55′49″N 1°17′43″E | | 1373901 | Upload Photo | Q26687095 |
| 5 and 6, Chesterfield Villas | II | 5-6, Chesterfield Villas, West Street, NR27 9EW | | | 24 May 1993 | TG2154042073; 52°55′49″N 1°17′41″E | | 1039613 | Upload Photo | Q26291410 |
| Flint House | II | 1 and 1a, Church Street | | | 3 November 2003 | TG2209642019; 52°55′47″N 1°18′11″E | | 1390650 | Upload Photo | Q26670033 |
| Churchyard Boundary Wall to South, North and West of Church of St Peter and St Paul Including 3 Pairs of Gate Piers to South and West of Church | II | North And West Of Church Of St Peter And St Paul Including 3 Pairs Of Gate Piers To South And West Of Church, Church Street | | | 21 January 1977 | TG2192342204; 52°55′53″N 1°18′02″E | | 1171626 | Upload Photo | Q26465800 |
| Numbers 3, 5 and 7 Including 3a, 5a, 5b and 5c, and Flats 1, 2 and 3 at Number 7 | II | 5 and 7 Including 3a, 5a, 5b and 5c, And Flats 1, 2 and 3 At Number 7, 3, 5 and 7, Church Street | | | 3 November 2003 | TG2208742030; 52°55′47″N 1°18′10″E | | 1390651 | Upload Photo | Q26670034 |
| 18,20, Church Street | II | 18, 20, Church Street | | | 21 January 1977 | TG2207342117; 52°55′50″N 1°18′10″E | | 1049028 | Upload Photo | Q26301085 |
| 22, Church Street | II | 22, Church Street | | | 21 January 1977 | TG2206842121; 52°55′50″N 1°18′10″E | | 1049029 | Upload Photo | Q26301086 |
| 26,28, Church Street | II | 26, 28, Church Street | | | 21 January 1977 | TG2205342137; 52°55′50″N 1°18′09″E | | 1305535 | Upload Photo | Q26592388 |
| Boots Chemist | II | 51, 51a, Church Street | | | 21 January 1977 | TG2191442168; 52°55′52″N 1°18′01″E | | 1049027 | Upload Photo | Q26301084 |
| Ship Hotel | II | 53, Church Street | | | 21 January 1977 | TG2190342171; 52°55′52″N 1°18′01″E | | 1373882 | Upload Photo | Q26654797 |
| Albion Hotel | II | Church Street | hotel | | 21 January 1977 | TG2203942149; 52°55′51″N 1°18′08″E | | 1049031 | Albion Hotel More images | Q26301088 |
| Monument to Jh Earle North East of Church of St Peter and St Paul | II | Church Street | | | 21 January 1977 | TG2199842215; 52°55′53″N 1°18′06″E | | 1049034 | Upload Photo | Q26301090 |
| Parish Church of St Peter and St Paul | I | Church Street | church building | | 28 November 1950 | TG2197142201; 52°55′53″N 1°18′05″E | | 1049032 | Parish Church of St Peter and St Paul More images | Q17536715 |
| War Memorial South of Church of St Peter and St Paul | II | Church Street | war memorial | | 21 January 1977 | TG2198442175; 52°55′52″N 1°18′05″E | | 1049033 | War Memorial South of Church of St Peter and St Paul More images | Q26301089 |
| Bethuell Stimpson Monument at Cromer Old Cemetery | II | Cromer Old Cemetery, Holt Road, NR27 9EB | | | 18 August 2020 | TG2119641970; 52°55′46″N 1°17′23″E | | 1471824 | Upload Photo | Q98596509 |
| George Harrison Monument at Cromer Old Cemetery | II | Cromer Old Cemetery, Holt Road, NR27 9EB | | | 18 August 2020 | TG2120141951; 52°55′46″N 1°17′23″E | | 1471825 | Upload Photo | Q98596511 |
| James Davies Monument at Cromer Old Cemetery | II | Cromer Old Cemetery, Holt Road, NR27 9EB | | | 18 August 2020 | TG2120241947; 52°55′46″N 1°17′23″E | | 1471823 | Upload Photo | Q98596506 |
| William Balls Monument at Cromer Old Cemetery | II | Cromer Old Cemetery, Holt Road, NR27 9EB | | | 18 August 2020 | TG2117541954; 52°55′46″N 1°17′21″E | | 1471822 | Upload Photo | Q98596480 |
| The Watch House | II | East Cliff | house | | 21 January 1977 | TG2216242158; 52°55′51″N 1°18′15″E | | 1373910 | The Watch House More images | Q26654827 |
| Cromer Pier | II | Esplanade | pier | | 24 November 1975 | TG2195242426; 52°56′00″N 1°18′04″E | | 1049005 | Cromer Pier More images | Q3003702 |
| 31, Garden Street | II | 31, Garden Street | | | 21 January 1977 | TG2187242293; 52°55′56″N 1°17′59″E | | 1049008 | Upload Photo | Q26301065 |
| 33,35, Garden Street | II | 33, 35, Garden Street | | | 21 January 1977 | TG2187742300; 52°55′56″N 1°18′00″E | | 1049009 | Upload Photo | Q26301066 |
| The Wellington Public House | II | Garden Street | pub | | 21 January 1977 | TG2188242310; 52°55′56″N 1°18′00″E | | 1049010 | The Wellington Public House More images | Q26301067 |
| Cromer Hall Including Adjoining Stables | II* | Hall Road, NR27 9JG | house | | 21 January 1977 | TG2145841660; 52°55′36″N 1°17′36″E | | 1049011 | Cromer Hall Including Adjoining Stables More images | Q5187594 |
| South Lodge to Cromer Hall Including Entrance Gate Piers and Boundary Walls | II | Hall Road, NR27 9JG | | | 13 July 2012 | TG2150841225; 52°55′22″N 1°17′37″E | | 1408555 | Upload Photo | Q26676023 |
| 3,5, High Street | II | 3, 5, High Street | | | 21 January 1977 | TG2192142279; 52°55′55″N 1°18′02″E | | 1171672 | Upload Photo | Q26465936 |
| 7, High Street | II | 7, High Street | | | 21 January 1977 | TG2192442270; 52°55′55″N 1°18′02″E | | 1049012 | Upload Photo | Q26301068 |
| 9, High Street | II | 9, High Street | | | 21 January 1977 | TG2192642264; 52°55′55″N 1°18′02″E | | 1049013 | Upload Photo | Q26301069 |
| North Part of Premises of Murdock Norton | II | 12, High Street | | | 21 January 1977 | TG2191142252; 52°55′54″N 1°18′01″E | | 1049014 | Upload Photo | Q26301070 |
| Home House | II | High Street | | | 31 December 1969 | TG2190842267; 52°55′55″N 1°18′01″E | | 1373872 | Upload Photo | Q26654787 |
| Kings Head Public House | II | High Street | pub | | 21 January 1977 | TG2190042292; 52°55′56″N 1°18′01″E | | 1171685 | Kings Head Public House More images | Q26465970 |
| Semaphore Signals at Former Beach Station | II | Holt Road | | | 24 May 2000 | TG2124442021; 52°55′48″N 1°17′25″E | | 1380343 | Upload Photo | Q26660549 |
| Signal Box at Former Beach Station | II | Holt Road | signal box | | 24 May 2000 | TG2122742004; 52°55′47″N 1°17′24″E | | 1380342 | Signal Box at Former Beach Station More images | Q26660548 |
| Hotel De Paris Including Range at Rear Facing High Street | II | Jetty Cliff | hotel | | 21 January 1977 | TG2192442300; 52°55′56″N 1°18′02″E | | 1171691 | Hotel De Paris Including Range at Rear Facing High Street More images | Q5912163 |
| 11, High Street (see Details for Further Address Information) | II | 1, Jetty Street | | | 21 January 1977 | TG2192842253; 52°55′54″N 1°18′02″E | | 1049015 | Upload Photo | Q26301071 |
| 3,5, Jetty Street | II | 3, 5, Jetty Street | | | 21 January 1977 | TG2193342263; 52°55′55″N 1°18′03″E | | 1373873 | Upload Photo | Q26654788 |
| 4, Jetty Street | II | 4, Jetty Street | | | 21 January 1977 | TG2194142253; 52°55′54″N 1°18′03″E | | 1049016 | Upload Photo | Q26301072 |
| 6, Jetty Street | II | 6, Jetty Street | | | 21 January 1977 | TG2194242259; 52°55′55″N 1°18′03″E | | 1171744 | Upload Photo | Q26466122 |
| 7, Jetty Street | II | 7, Jetty Street | | | 21 January 1977 | TG2193742276; 52°55′55″N 1°18′03″E | | 1171735 | Upload Photo | Q26466097 |
| 8, Jetty Street | II | 8, Jetty Street | | | 21 January 1977 | TG2194542265; 52°55′55″N 1°18′03″E | | 1373874 | Upload Photo | Q26654789 |
| 10,10a, Jetty Street | II | 10, 10a, Jetty Street | | | 21 January 1977 | TG2194942272; 52°55′55″N 1°18′04″E | | 1049017 | Upload Photo | Q26301073 |
| Victoria Cottage and Victoria Shop | II | Jetty Street | | | 21 January 1977 | TG2195342289; 52°55′56″N 1°18′04″E | | 1049018 | Upload Photo | Q26301074 |
| Victoria House | II | Jetty Street | | | 21 January 1977 | TG2196042296; 52°55′56″N 1°18′04″E | | 1305450 | Upload Photo | Q26592311 |
| Woodford House | II | Jetty Street | | | 21 January 1977 | TG2195342281; 52°55′55″N 1°18′04″E | | 1171756 | Upload Photo | Q26466162 |
| Holly Cottage | II | Louden Road | | | 14 September 2004 | TG2180942121; 52°55′50″N 1°17′56″E | | 1391090 | Upload Photo | Q26670457 |
| West Cottage | II | Louden Road | | | 14 September 2004 | TG2182742118; 52°55′50″N 1°17′57″E | | 1391091 | Upload Photo | Q26670458 |
| 9, New Street | II | 9, New Street | | | 21 January 1977 | TG2185542319; 52°55′57″N 1°17′59″E | | 1373875 | Upload Photo | Q26654790 |
| Former Lloyds Bank, Now Country House Salon and Shop Premises. | II | Now Country House Salon And Shop Premises., Church Street | | | 1 July 2002 | TG2200542135; 52°55′50″N 1°18′06″E | | 1360816 | Upload Photo | Q26642872 |
| Sutherland House | II | Overstand Road | | | 1 March 1991 | TG2243241689; 52°55′35″N 1°18′28″E | | 1373900 | Upload Photo | Q26654817 |
| Old Bracondale | II | 10, Overstrand Road, NR27 0AJ | architectural structure | | 21 January 1977 | TG2226241992; 52°55′45″N 1°18′20″E | | 1373877 | Old Bracondale More images | Q26654792 |
| Cliff Lane Cottage | II | 45, Overstrand Road | | | 21 January 1977 | TG2238441868; 52°55′41″N 1°18′26″E | | 1171754 | Upload Photo | Q26466156 |
| Grove Cottage | II | 111, Overstrand Road | | | 21 January 1977 | TG2269641464; 52°55′28″N 1°18′42″E | | 1049020 | Upload Photo | Q26301076 |
| Cromer Lighthouse | II | Overstrand Road | lighthouse | | 21 January 1977 | TG2303641509; 52°55′29″N 1°19′00″E | | 1171781 | Cromer Lighthouse More images | Q2752583 |
| North Lodge | II | Overstrand Road | gatehouse | | 21 January 1977 | TG2220942129; 52°55′50″N 1°18′17″E | | 1049019 | North Lodge More images | Q26301075 |
| The Grove | II | Overstrand Road | | | 21 January 1977 | TG2260241546; 52°55′31″N 1°18′37″E | | 1373876 | Upload Photo | Q26654791 |
| Old Town Hall | II | Prince Of Wales Road | theatre building | | 21 January 1977 | TG2171442194; 52°55′53″N 1°17′51″E | | 1171785 | Old Town Hall More images | Q26466248 |
| Cliftonville Hotel | II | Runton Road | hotel | | 15 September 2003 | TG2141042350; 52°55′58″N 1°17′35″E | | 1390731 | Cliftonville Hotel More images | Q5133358 |
| 1-4, the Crescent | II | 1-4, The Crescent | | | 21 January 1977 | TG2208942201; 52°55′52″N 1°18′11″E | | 1171643 | Upload Photo | Q26465845 |
| Colne Cottage | II | The Croft | | | 21 January 1977 | TG2176942048; 52°55′48″N 1°17′53″E | | 1049003 | Upload Photo | Q26301061 |
| Colne House Hotel | II | The Croft | | | 21 January 1977 | TG2187441992; 52°55′46″N 1°17′59″E | | 1049004 | Upload Photo | Q26301062 |
| 1-6, the Gangway | II | 1-6, The Gangway | | | 21 January 1977 | TG2208542122; 52°55′50″N 1°18′10″E | | 1373911 | Upload Photo | Q26654828 |
| Newstead House | II | 7, The Gangway | | | 21 January 1977 | TG2208742136; 52°55′50″N 1°18′11″E | | 1049006 | Upload Photo | Q26301063 |
| Brunswick House (including Are Railings) | II | The Gangway | | | 28 November 1950 | TG2209442171; 52°55′52″N 1°18′11″E | | 1049007 | Upload Photo | Q26301064 |
| Barclays Bank | II | Tucker Street | | | 21 January 1977 | TG2194042244; 52°55′54″N 1°18′03″E | | 1305423 | Upload Photo | Q26592289 |
| Melrose Cottage and Malyard House | II | Tucker Street | | | 21 January 1977 | TG2202542215; 52°55′53″N 1°18′07″E | | 1171814 | Upload Photo | Q26466333 |
| Peels House | II | Tucker Street | | | 21 January 1977 | TG2201242229; 52°55′54″N 1°18′07″E | | 1049021 | Upload Photo | Q26301077 |
| 8-18, Norwich Road (see Details for Further Address Information) | II | 2a, Vicarage Road | | | 3 September 2007 | TG2208441907; 52°55′43″N 1°18′10″E | | 1392265 | Upload Photo | Q26671494 |
| Kandahar Flats | II | West Cliff | | | 21 January 1977 | TG2185742337; 52°55′57″N 1°17′59″E | | 1171817 | Upload Photo | Q26466341 |
| Regency Hotel | II | West Cliff | hotel | | 21 January 1977 | TG2188442328; 52°55′57″N 1°18′00″E | | 1049022 | Regency Hotel More images | Q26301078 |
| Western House | II | West Cliff | | | 21 January 1977 | TG2184242340; 52°55′57″N 1°17′58″E | | 1373878 | Upload Photo | Q26654793 |
| 5-11, West Street | II | 5-11, West Street | | | 21 January 1977 | TG2178542163; 52°55′52″N 1°17′55″E | | 1373899 | Upload Photo | Q26654816 |
| 17,19, West Street | II | 17, 19, West Street | | | 21 January 1977 | TG2174942141; 52°55′51″N 1°17′53″E | | 1039610 | Upload Photo | Q26291407 |
| Chesterfield Lodge | II | West Street, NR27 9DT | | | 24 May 1993 | TG2159142086; 52°55′50″N 1°17′44″E | | 1039612 | Upload Photo | Q26291409 |
| The White Horse Public House | II | West Street | pub | | 21 January 1977 | TG2169042119; 52°55′50″N 1°17′49″E | | 1039611 | The White Horse Public House More images | Q26291408 |
| Terraced Beach Chalets, the Promenade, Cromer | II | Western Promenade | | | 13 July 2012 | TG2160842416; 52°56′00″N 1°17′46″E | | 1408235 | Upload Photo | Q26675989 |

== See also ==
- Grade I listed buildings in Norfolk
- Grade II* listed buildings in Norfolk

== Sources ==
- Wilson, Bill; Pevsner, Nikolaus (1999) [1962], Norfolk 2: North-West and South, The Buildings of England, New Haven and London: Yale University Press, ISBN 978-0-300-09657-6
