= Westwick, Norfolk =

Village in Norfolk, England

Coordinates: 52.791033°N 1.378098°E

Westwick
- Location within Norfolk
- Area: 4.88 km^{2} (1.88 sq mi)
- OS grid reference: TG278268
- Civil parish: Westwick
- District: North Norfolk
- Shire county: Norfolk
- Region: East
- Country: England
- Sovereign state: United Kingdom
- Post town: NORWICH
- Postcode district: NR10
- Police: Norfolk
- Fire: Norfolk
- Ambulance: East of England

Westwick is a village and civil parish in the English county of Norfolk, situated to the south of North Walsham. It covers an area of 4.88 km^{2} (1.88 sq mi) and had a population of 53 in 29 households at the 2001 census. The population remained less than 100 at the 2011 Census and was included in the civil parish of Swanton Abbott. For the purposes of local government, it falls within the district of North Norfolk.

== History ==
The villages name means 'West specialised farm'.

Westwick House was built in 1704 for John Berney and later passed (through marriage) to the Petres family. It is now owned by the Alexander family who own the entire estate. They have done so for 74 years.

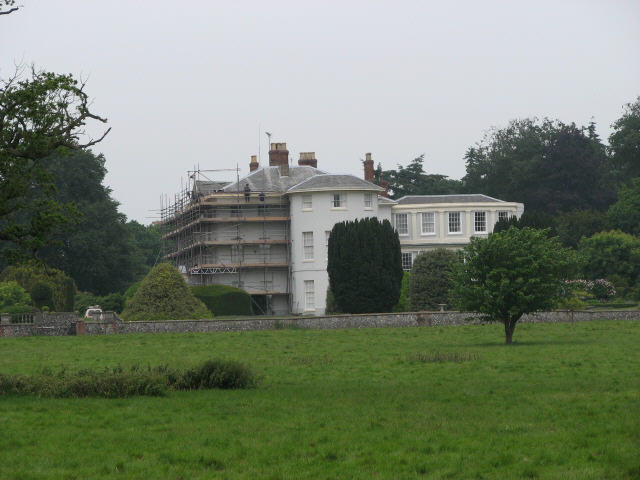
Westwick House
