= Wicklewood =

Village in Norfolk, England

Coordinates: 52.580314°N 1.061211°E

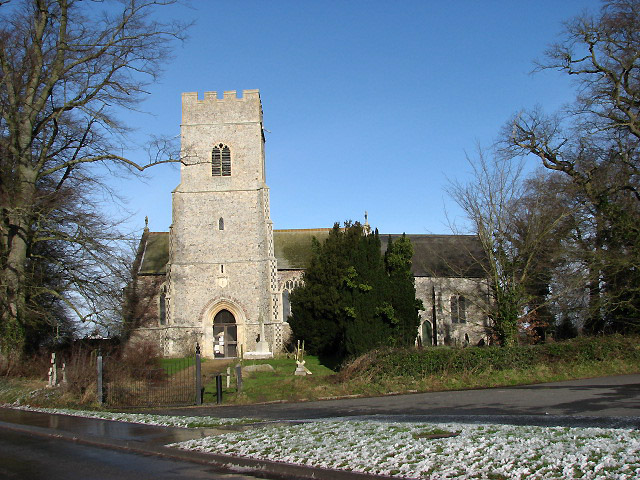
- Church of St Andrew and All Saints

- Location within Norfolk
- Area: 8.75 km^{2} (3.38 sq mi)
- Population: 922 (2011)
  - Density: 105/km^{2} (270/sq mi)
- OS grid reference: TG075024
- Civil parish: Wicklewood
- District: South Norfolk
- Shire county: Norfolk
- Region: East
- Country: England
- Sovereign state: United Kingdom
- Post town: WYMONDHAM
- Postcode district: NR18
- Dialling code: 01953
- Police: Norfolk
- Fire: Norfolk
- Ambulance: East of England
- UK Parliament: Mid Norfolk

Wicklewood is a village and civil parish in the South Norfolk district of Norfolk, England. The village lies 11 miles (18 km) west of Norwich and to the west of the market town of Wymondham. The parish includes the village of Crownthorpe. The parish covers an area of 8.75 km^{2} (3.38 sq mi) and had a population of 886 in 345 households at the 2001 census, which had increased to 922 at the 2011 census.

The name probably means "wych-elm wood/clearing". 'Wood' is redundant.

== Governance ==
An electoral ward in the same name exists. This ward had a population of 3,308 at the 2011 census.

On 1 April 1935 the parish of Crownthorpe was abolished and merged with Wicklewood.

== Amenities ==
The village has a small primary school, Wicklewood School, as well as a small church, St Andrews and All Saints.

Wicklewood village hall still houses guides and dance classes for locals. To rent the hall it costs £10.50 per hour for residents and £12.50 per hour for non-residents.

Wicklewood has a local cricket team that participates in various Sunday League matches and was the holder of the Wicklewood Shield trophy won in 2006.

The village also has one public house called the Cherry Tree.

Hospital Road is the site of a large neo-Georgian building, now private homes. This is the former Forehoe workhouse, built in the late 19th century. In 1948 it was incorporated into the National Health Service as Hill House Hospital, later Wicklewood Geriatric Hospital, before closing in 1974.

The former Ashcroft supported housing centre on Milestone Lane has been closed since 2015: as of 2019, the buildings are for sale to be redeveloped as private housing.

The former St James Church on Low Street served the community of Crownthorpe. Its patron was Lord Wodehouse. It is now a private residence.

== Roman remains ==
The site of a Romano-Celtic temple near Wicklewood was discovered from cropmarks in 1959, and was excavated in that year. It evidently served a settlement nearby, as many Roman objects have been found.

Wicklewood Gallery

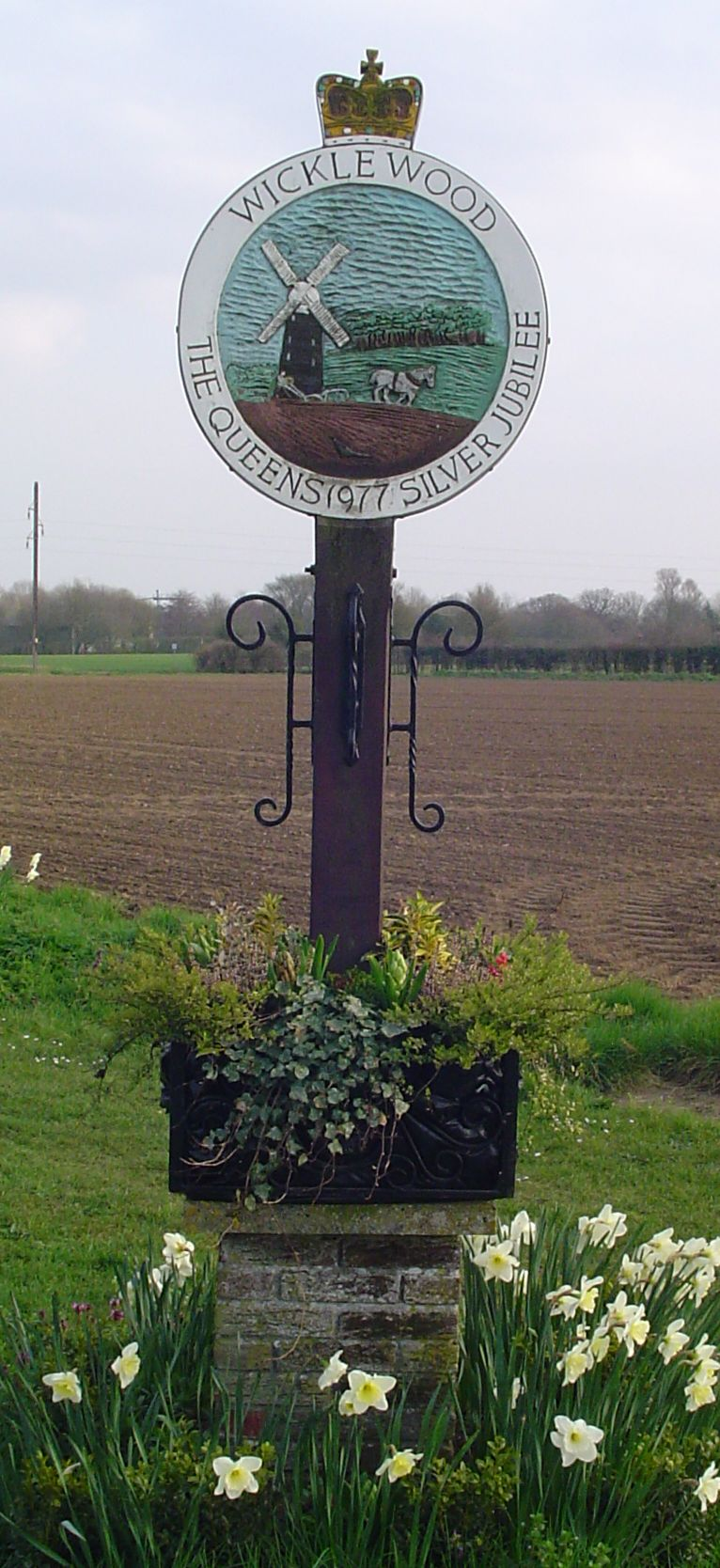
Signpost in Wicklewood

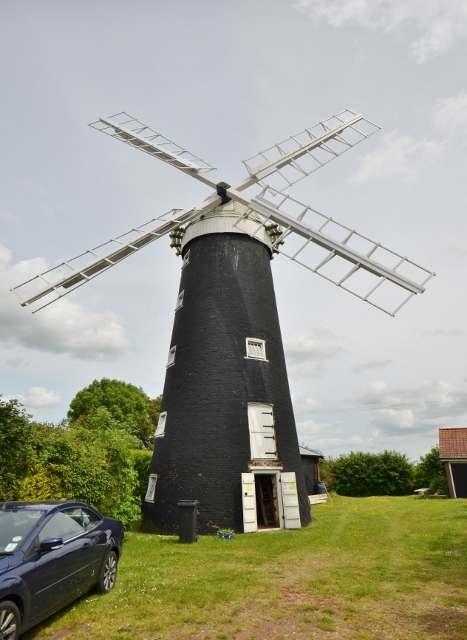
Wicklewood Windmill

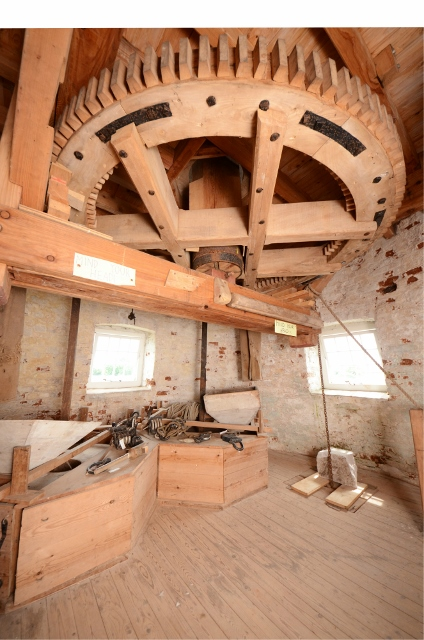
The inside of the mill

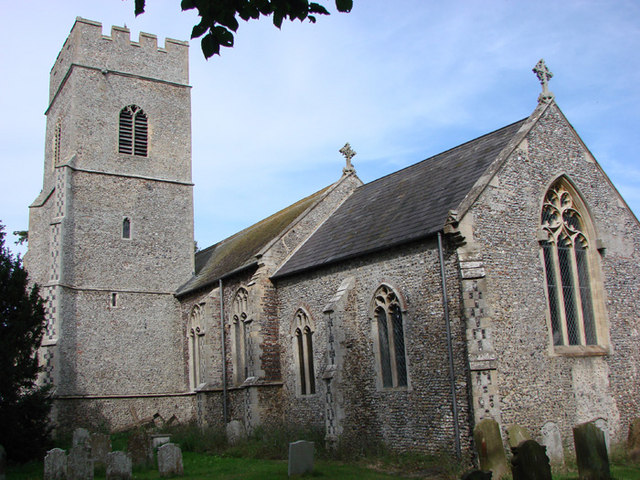
St Andrews and All Saints Church

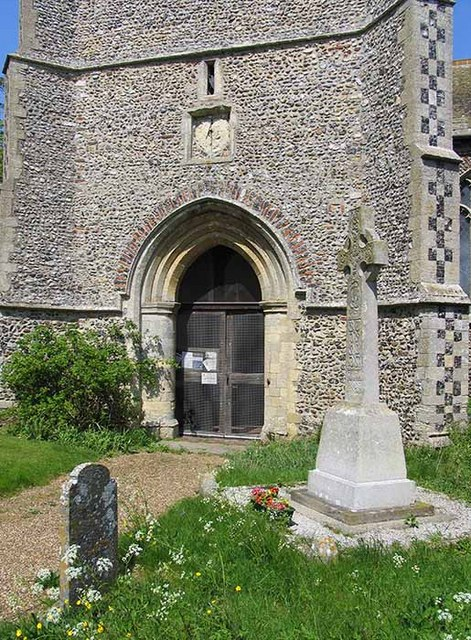
A close up of the church
