= Pagans Hill Roman temple =

Pagans Hill Roman Temple
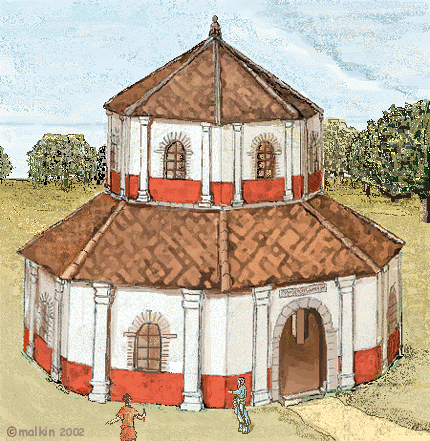
- A reconstruction drawing of Pagans Hill Roman Temple

- Map showing the location of Pagans Hill Roman Temple in Somerset.
- 51.360732°N 2.6373580°W
- Type: Romano-Celtic Temple
- Cultures: Roman
- Location: Chew Stoke, Somerset.
- Region: South-West

History
- Built: 3rd Century AD
- Abandoned: 4th Century AD

Site notes
- Management: English Heritage

The Pagans Hill Roman Temple was a Romano-British-style temple (Romano-Celtic temple) excavated on Pagans Hill at Chew Stoke in the English county of Somerset.

== History ==
The temple faced east and was first built in the late-3rd century, possibly to the god Mercury. After the collapse of the original building another temple was built, which again fell into ruin. The final rebuild, after about 367 CE included the addition of an internal screen. The latest dateable coin found at the site was of Arcadius (383–408). The last building collapsed in the 5th century.

The site of the temple is on the aptly named Pagans Hill, although that name is modern and any link to the site in the naming of the road has been lost.

== Appearance ==
It was a double-octagonal temple building comprised an inner wall, which formed the cella or sanctuary, surrounded by an outer wall forming an ambulatory, or covered walkway. The outer portico measures about 56½ feet in diameter, the inner cellar about 32 feet across. All walls were about 3 feet thick. Along each wall were two features described by Rahtz as buttresses but were more likely to have been pilasters, as their small size would render them ineffective as wall supports. Warwick Rodwell suggests that the ambulatory would have been cross-vaulted and the pilasters used as external supports for this. This would allow for a good deal of natural light to circulate the building and give an aesthetically balanced look to the structure. The ambulatory would then give the illusion of a labyrinth of side chambers running off from the central area.

The site formed a large pilgrimage centre including guest houses and priest's house as well as the octagonal temple and holy well.

== Excavations ==
The temple was on a promontory overlooking the River Chew. It was excavated by Philip Rahtz between 1949 and 1953. In addition to the foundations of the temple a well (17 metres deep) and several ditches were found which contained small artifacts showing occupation of the site before the Roman period including pottery of Iron Age type, and a coin dating from c. 335–337 CE. Evidence of continuing use after the Roman period is provided by a bucket and an exotic 7th century glass jar found in the well.

It was originally thought, on its discovery in 1830, to have been a beacon, for signalling between adjoining hill forts.

== Pagans Hill Dog ==
Among the artefacts found in the well approximately 15 meters west of the temple foundations, was an unusual sculpture of a dog with collar. The statue was in four sections, measured 63 cm in height overall and was made of Doulting Stone, a limestone, as still quarried today at Doulting Stone Quarry.

== See also ==
- Ancient Roman religion
- Roman Britain
- History of Somerset
