= Forest of Halatte =

Forest of Halatte French: Forêt d'Halatte
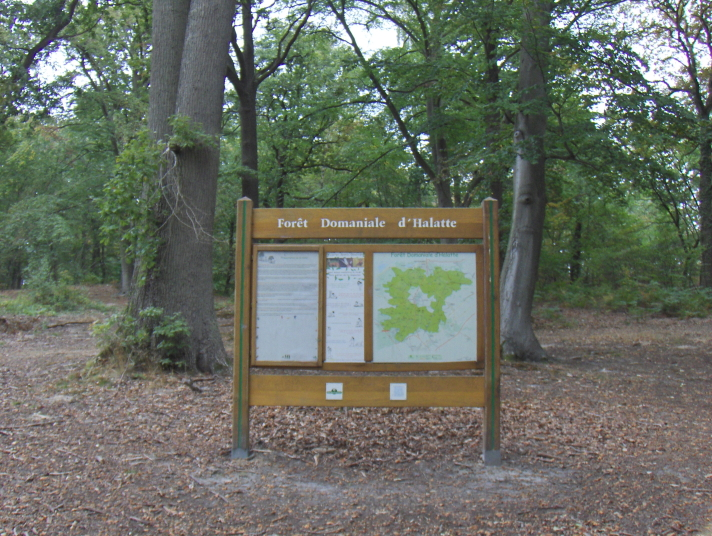
- Tourist information sign at Aumont-en-Halatte

- Location within France

Geography
- Location: Oise, Picardy, France
- Coordinates: 49°14′45″N 2°34′15″E
- Area: 43 square kilometres (17 sq mi)

Administration
- Status: Dominial

Ecology
- Dominant tree species: Sessile oak, European beech

The Forest of Halatte (Forêt d'Halatte, French pronunciation: [fɔʁɛ dalat]) in Picardy is one of the largest remaining blocks of natural old-growth forest in France. Situated in the département of Oise near Senlis and Pont-Sainte-Maxence, it currently encompasses 43 square kilometres (17 sq mi). Together with the Forest of Chantilly and the Forest of Ermenonville it forms the Massif des Trois Forêts. On the north it borders the Forest of Compiègne. Halatte is still a source of oak and beech timber.

The forest, a fragment separated from the ancient Silva Cotia (forêt de Cuise) cited in the 6th century CE, which became the Forest of Compiègne, bears numerous traces of its prehistoric habitation, in the form of menhirs and dolmens and late Iron Age burials. In the commune of Ognon are the remains of a Gallo-Roman temple dedicated to a curative deity, built in the mid-1st century CE and abandoned during the 4th century. The temple's stones were then quarried for reuse, and the site became overgrown by the forest. the temple was discovered and excavated in 1873-74 and more professionally examined in 1996–99. The objects discovered over the course of the excavation, including coins, votive offerings, fibulae and other jewellery, are exhibited at the Art and Archeology museum of Senlis.

The inexplicable name Halatte first appears in a document of 1165, as Locus Halachius. A hunting accident in the Forest of Halatte claimed the life of King Philip IV of France in November 1314. At a meeting at St-Christophe-en-Halatte, Edward III of England made his last act of homage for Gascony, to Philip VI, in April 1331. The forest was in part a royal domaine and otherwise divided among clerics and nobles. To this day, boundary markers carved with coats-of-arms mark the old divisions. During the French Revolution, the whole forest was declared domaniale, a national property.

An obelisk raised to commemorate Napoleon II, the King of Rome, Napoleon's heir, stands in the forest, south of Pont-Sainte-Maxence. The Forest of Halatte is traversed by a network of walking and bicycling trails maintained by the French government.
