= Pièces-Grandes sanctuary =

Gallo-Roman sanctuary with three temples

Pièces-Grandes Sanctuary
- View of the primary temple's remains.

- Location within France
- 45°27′03″N 2°25′34″E
- Type: Romano-Celtic Temple
- Periods: Classical Antiquity
- Cultures: Lemovices, Gallo-Roman
- Location: Margerides (Corrèze)
- Region: Nouvelle-Aquitaine

History
- Built: 1st century
- Abandoned: 5th century

Site notes
- Material: Granite
- Excavation dates: 1965–1988
- Condition: Ruined
- Owner: Municipality

Monument historique
- Designated: 1984

The Pièces-Grandes sanctuary is an archaeological complex in Margerides (Corrèze), France featuring Gallo-Roman temple remains.

The sanctuary sits near a Roman road two kilometers east of the modern town. Within its perimeter wall are three square, centrally-planned temples known as fana. Two additional annex buildings lie outside the enclosure.

The sanctuary complex was classified as a historic monument in 1984.

== Architecture ==
=== Temple one ===
The sanctuary's largest temple faces east and is composed of an inner cella surrounded by an ambulatory or gallery. Its walls are built of heavy gray granite masonry 48 cm thick, with an average surviving height of half a meter. The temple measures 12.80 m wide on the outside, with its inner cella measuring 7 meters.

The gallery's exterior wall is made up of small, even stone blocks. The other walls are made up of irregular stones. Larger, more precisely cut blocks shape the cornerstones.

The walls were coated with multi-color painted plaster (primarily red, yellow, and gray, along with traces of black, brown, pink, green, and white). The floor consisted of a white mortar layer resting on top of rubble foundation made of small stones ranging 10 to 15 cm in size.

=== Aediculae ===
North of the primary temple, four or five small aediculae measuring two meters across were likely shrines or offering deposits. This sector of the complex has proven notably rich in artifacts.

=== Temples two and three ===
South of the primary temple, and in line with its facade, are two other fana with square floorplans of more modest proportions.

The larger of these two temples sits only 1.20 m apart from the primary temple. It is made up of a 4.75 m wide cella with a gallery that is 9 meters across. On its north side, four granite blocks stand in place of the wall. These may have served as bases for wooden posts that upheld the roof, as the discovery of terracotta half-cylinders intended to encase such posts seems to suggest.

The smaller temple's central structure measures 4 meters on each side and faces east. The building partly lies on neighboring property, and is only partially excavated. A gallery with a width of 1.40 m is marked on its west side by a foundation wall and granite blocks. As with the larger temple, this arrangement suggests the use of wooden posts to support the roof, which likewise would have been encased in terracotta coverings. An ornate granite chest placed at the center of the building rested on a masonry base set above a concrete floor. Beneath this, a rectangular ditch measuring 2.60 m by 2.40 m contained the remains of wooden channeling.

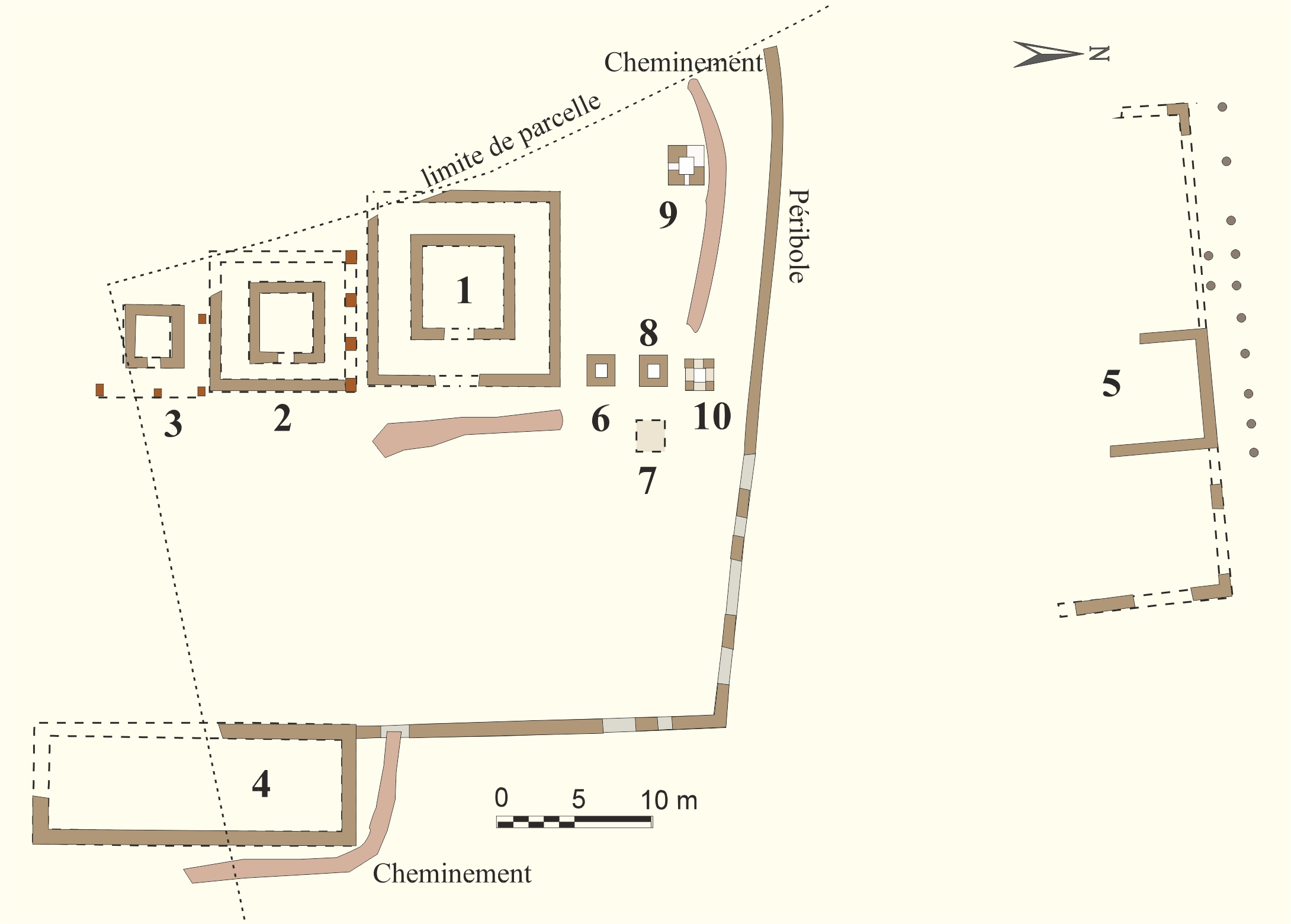
Map of the sanctuary complex.

=== Perimeter wall ===
A rudimentary enclosure wall or peribolos has been uncovered to the north and east of the temples. On the east side, opposite the primary temple, is an opening that led to a pathway paved with tile debris. To the southeast, a rectangular building made of only one, elongated room attaches to the wall.

=== Outer buildings ===
Outside of the north perimeter wall is a building (or group of buildings) that has only been subject to limited survey digs. The building's north facade featured a covered gallery supported by wooden posts, which in turn were clad with terracotta elements.

=== Newfound structures ===
Recent cartographic analysis has found an enclosure and circular structures that were previously undocumented. Test digs have also revealed the presence of post holes and a palisade dating to the 1st century that indicate perishable buildings which preceded the construction of stone buildings on the site.

== Religious relics ==
=== Idols ===
Multiple small statues have been unearthed at the site, representing various gods that were worshiped there. Some are sculpted out of volcanic rock from Auvergne.

Artifacts discovered at site

Bronze statuette of the Gaulish god Cernunnos.

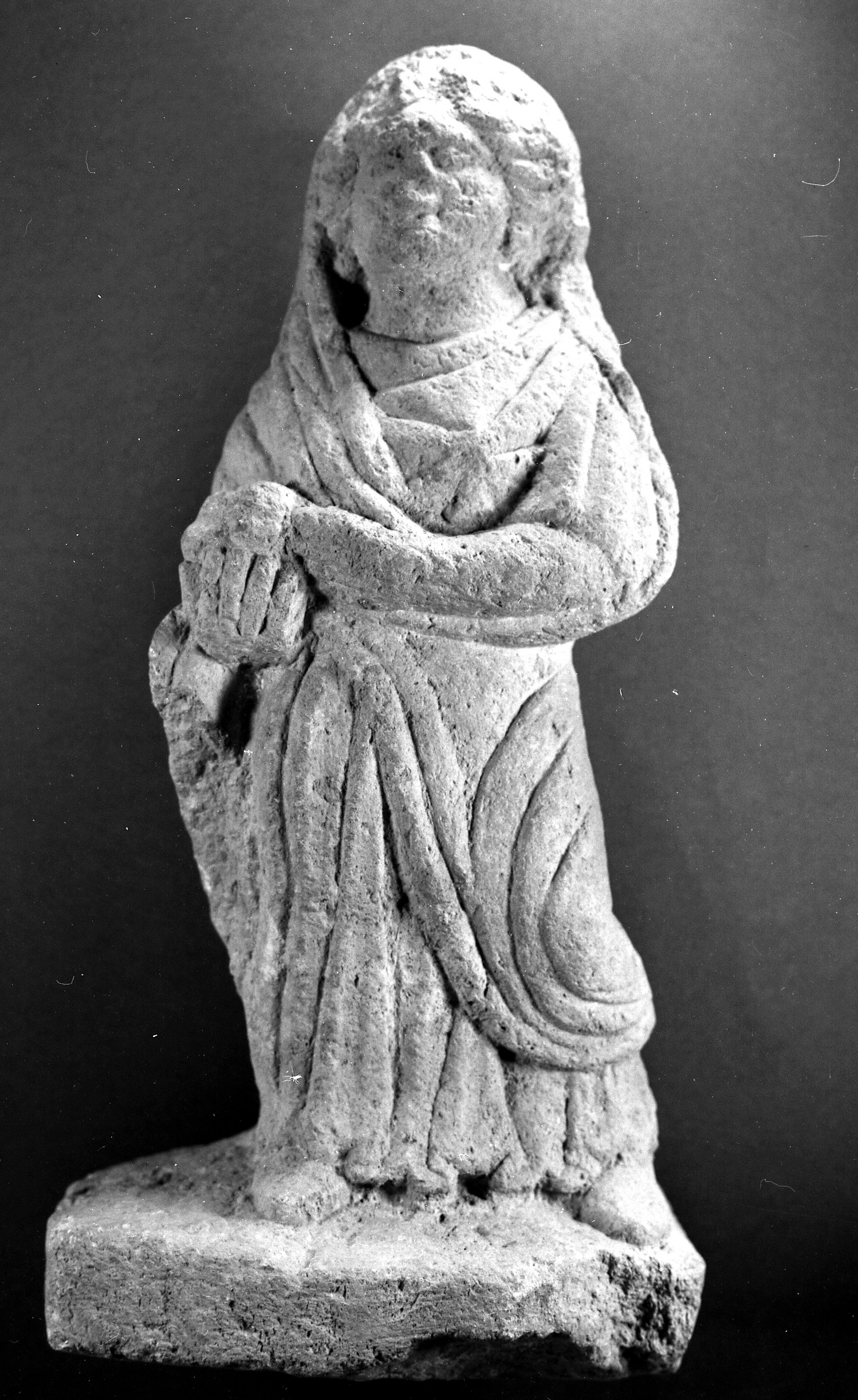
Tuff sculpture of a goddess.
- A mother goddess sculpture 38 cm in height (head missing) was found at the entry of the temple. She is seated in an armchair, draped in a gown, and wearing a torc around her neck.
- A similarly damaged statue of Mercury, standing clothed and wearing a brooch. It measures 38 cm tall (head and legs missing).
- A statue of a standing woman 60 cm in height was found fully preserved north of the primary temple. She stands with her right leg out, holding her right arm horizontally in a gesture of offering. She is clothed in a long dress and loose robe that covers part of her head.
- In the same location, the sculpted head of a woman, hair pulled back in a bun, was found in a perfect state of preservation. It measures 42 cm in height.
- A bronze statuette 14 cm tall depicts a bearded and antlered Cernunnos holding a torc in his right hand. The god wears sandals and is dressed in lozenge patterned clothes, covered with a cloak that reaches the knees, and fastened at the right shoulder.

The excavation also yielded several fragments of terracotta statuettes representing gods such as Venus, Hercules, and a mother goddess. There are also various figures of animals, some in bronze (boars, a ram, a rooster, a tortoise, a horse’s leg, etc.) and others in terracotta (a horse, a dog, a lion, a bird, etc.).

=== Coin offerings ===
Roman coins have been recovered from the temple and its immediate surroundings. Given the amount of wear, the coins from the Antonine dynasty were likely deposited or lost toward the end of the 2nd century, while the others date from the late 3rd to 4th century.

== Dating and analysis ==
Throughout the site, the lower layers contain an abundance of Gaulish artifacts, particularly coins and ceramics. The Gaulish coins are made of silver and are significantly lighter weight than other known coins of the same type. They are attributed to the Lemovices (and, with less certainty, to the Cadurci), and may date back to the 2nd century BCE. This initial phase of occupation likely began in the second half of the 1st century BCE, or perhaps during the Augustan period. It appears to have come to an end by the 70s–80s CE.

Initially, no structural features were found linked to these earlier strata, with the exception of a pit found beneath the lime-mortar floor of the middle temple, which contained only artifacts. However, more recent test digs uncovering layers predating the construction of the stone buildings have found traces of structures built out of perishable materials, such as a large posthole and what appears to be an east–west-oriented palisade dating to the Augustan period.

The second phase, which corresponds to the construction of the stone temples, can be dated to the end of the 1st century. The method used to construct the walls is moreover consistent with such a date. This period appears to have extended throughout the 2nd century, and probably part of the 3rd.

In the 3rd century, alterations (perhaps only for maintenance and repairs) must have taken place. Still, the temples continued to be frequented throughout the 4th century and even into the early 5th, as suggested by the newest coin found, which bears the portrait of Arcadius.

== Image Gallery ==
Main temple and aediculae.

Detail of main temple.

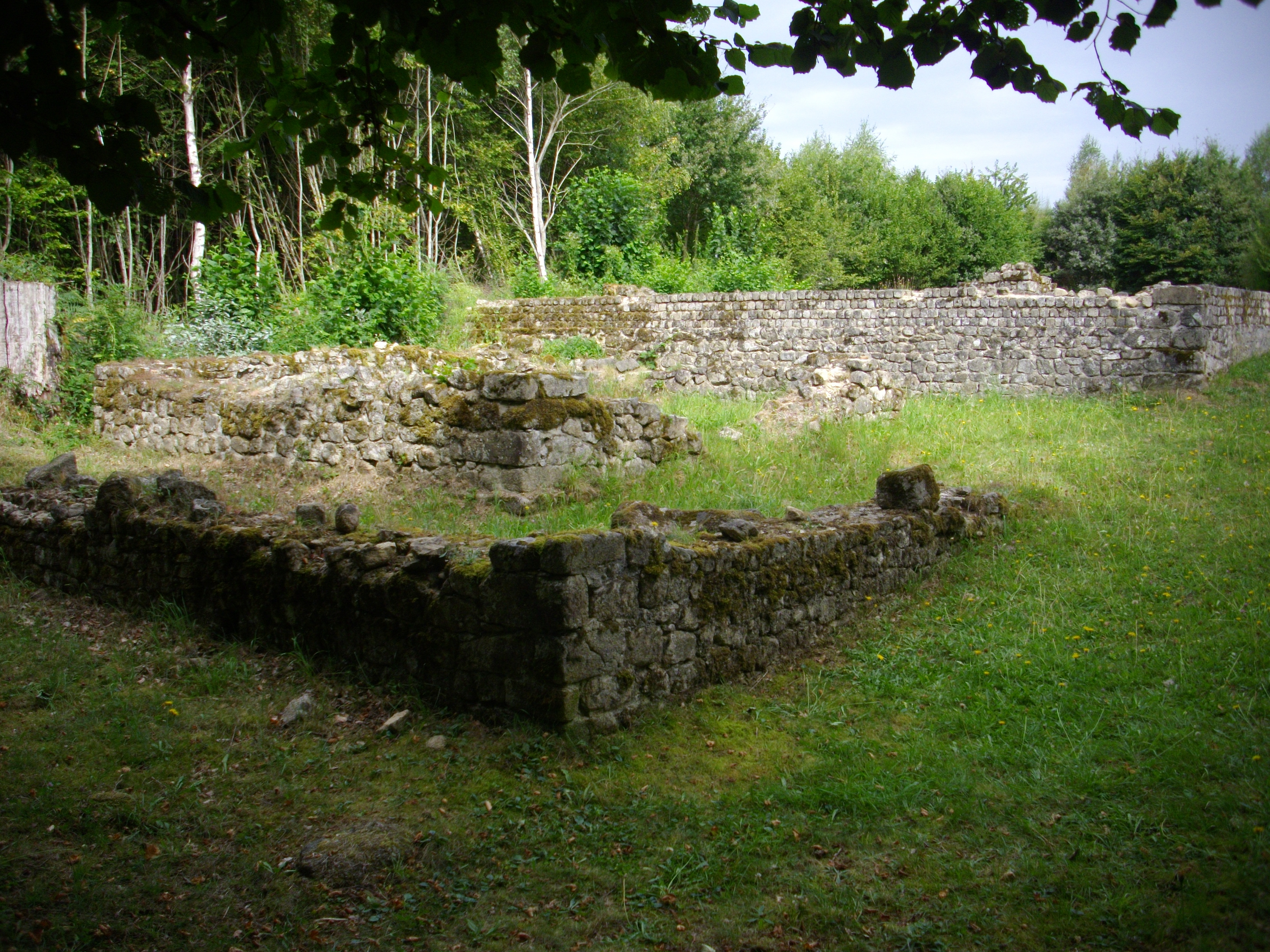
View of second temple.

== Bibliography ==
- Girond, Simon (25 October 2023). "Margerides – Les Pièces-Grandes". Archéologie de la France - Informations (ADLFI) (in French).
- Mercier, Georges; Mitard, Pierre-Henri; Sirat, Jacques (1967). "Le fanum gallo-romain des « Pièces-Grandes » à Margerides (Corrèze)". Revue archéologique du Centre (in French). 6 (1): 5–23.
- Mitard, Pierre-Henri (1979). "Monnaies d'argent gauloises découvertes à Margerides (Corrèze)". Revue archéologique du Centre (in French). 18 (1–2): 45–48.
- Sirat, André (1974). "Le site des Pièces-Grandes à Margerides (Corrèze)". Mélanges Marius Vazeilles (in French). Soc. des lettres, sciences et arts de la Corrèze, Tulle. pp. 83–90.
