= Wicklewood Windmill =

Windmill in Wicklewood, Norfolk, England

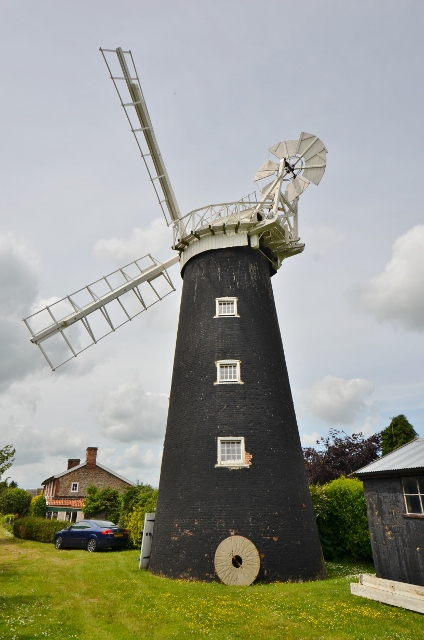
- Wicklewood Windmill, June 2013
- Interactive map of Wicklewood Windmill

Origin
- Mill name: Wicklewood Windmill
- Mill location: Wicklewood, Norfolk, United Kingdom
- Grid reference: TG 0765 0265
- Coordinates: 52°34′55″N 1°03′52″E
- Operator: Norfolk Windmills Trust
- Year built: 1846

Information
- Purpose: Corn mill
- Type: Tower mill
- Storeys: Five storeys
- No. of sails: Four
- Type of sails: Common sails, later Patent sails
- Windshaft: Cast iron
- Winding: Windmill fantail
- Fantail blades: Six
- Auxiliary power: Portable engine, later paraffin engine
- No. of pairs of millstones: Two pairs, plus a third pair driven by auxiliary power

Wicklewood Windmill is a Grade II listed tower mill in Wicklewood, Norfolk, United Kingdom. Built in 1846, it worked until 1942. The mill had become derelict by 1970. It was given to the Norfolk Windmills Trust in 1977 and has since been restored. It is occasionally open to the public.

== History ==
Wicklewood Windmill was built in 1846. John Browning Mallett was the first miller. He was followed by William Palmer around 1875 and Dames Doughty after 1878. Originally built with Common sails, Patent sails had been fitted by 1882. Doughty took a windmill at Mattishall and was followed by William Vout, miller from 1897 to 1902. He took a windmill at East Bradenham, and was followed by Walter Farrow in 1904. He later took Silfield Windmill, Wymondham. The mill was offered for sale by auction in August 1906. A steam engine had been installed by that date. The engine was a 7hp portable engine by Charles Burrell & Sons of Thetford, Norfolk. It drove a third pair of millstones, the windmill driving two pairs. The brake wheel from Silfield Mill was fitted to the mill in 1911. In about 1920, the portable engin was replaced by a 12/14hp paraffin engine made by Shanks. The mill was sold for £330 to William Wade. Wade died in 1942 and the mill passed to his son, Denis Edwin Wade. The mill ceased to work in this year. The engine driven stones were sold to J. & J. Colman, Norwich post-war.

The mill was listed Grade II on 2 October 1951. The mill had become derelict by 1970, with the cap sails and fantail missing. The cap frame and stocks remained. Denis Wade died in 1973 and mill passed to his daughter Margaret Edwards. She handed the mill over to the Norfolk Windmills Trust on 16 October 1977. Restoration of the mill was undertaken by John Lawn, millwright of Caston Windmill, Norfolk. A new cap with fantail was fitted to the mill on 12 November 1980. New steel stocks were fitted in May 1981 and new sails in July. The great spur wheel was replaced as the original had become rotten. The cap was again removed in 2005, being refitted to the mill on 21 July 2006. The upright shaft was replaced at this time. New wooden stocks and sails were fitted to the mill in October 2012. The work was done by R. Thompson & Sons, millwrights of Alford, Lincolnshire and the Norfolk Millwright Alliance. Wicklewood Windmill is occasionally open to the public.

== Description ==
Wicklewood Windmill is a five storey tower mill. The tower is about 43 feet (13 m) tall, with an inside diameter of 17 feet 0 inches (5.18 m) at ground floor level. It has a boat shape cap with a petticoat and gallery. The cap is winded by a six-bladed fantail. As built, the mill had four Common sails. These were later replaced by Patent sails. The outer pair had seven bays of three shutters. The inner pair also had seven bays, six bays of three shutters with the innermost bay having five shutters. The sails are 63 feet (19 m) long. During the mill's first restoration, they were fitted to 52 feet (16 m) steel stocks, which are carried on a cast iron windshaft 15 feet 2 inches (4.62 m) long, which appears to have been previously used in a post mill. The windshaft carries a 8 feet 3 inches (2.51 m) diameter cast iron brake wheel. The upright shaft is a composite one, cast iron at the top and wood at the bottom. It carries a cast iron wallower at the top. The upright shaft is 14 inches (360 mm) square at the bottom. It carries a 7 feet 0 inches (2.13 m) diameter wooden great spur wheel. This drives two pairs of millstones overdrift. One pair is French Burr, the other pair has a French Burr runner stone on a Peak bedstone. The engine drive stones were driven underdrift. They were French Burr stones.
