= Romano-Celtic temple =

Sub-class of Roman temples found in the north-western provinces of the Roman Empire

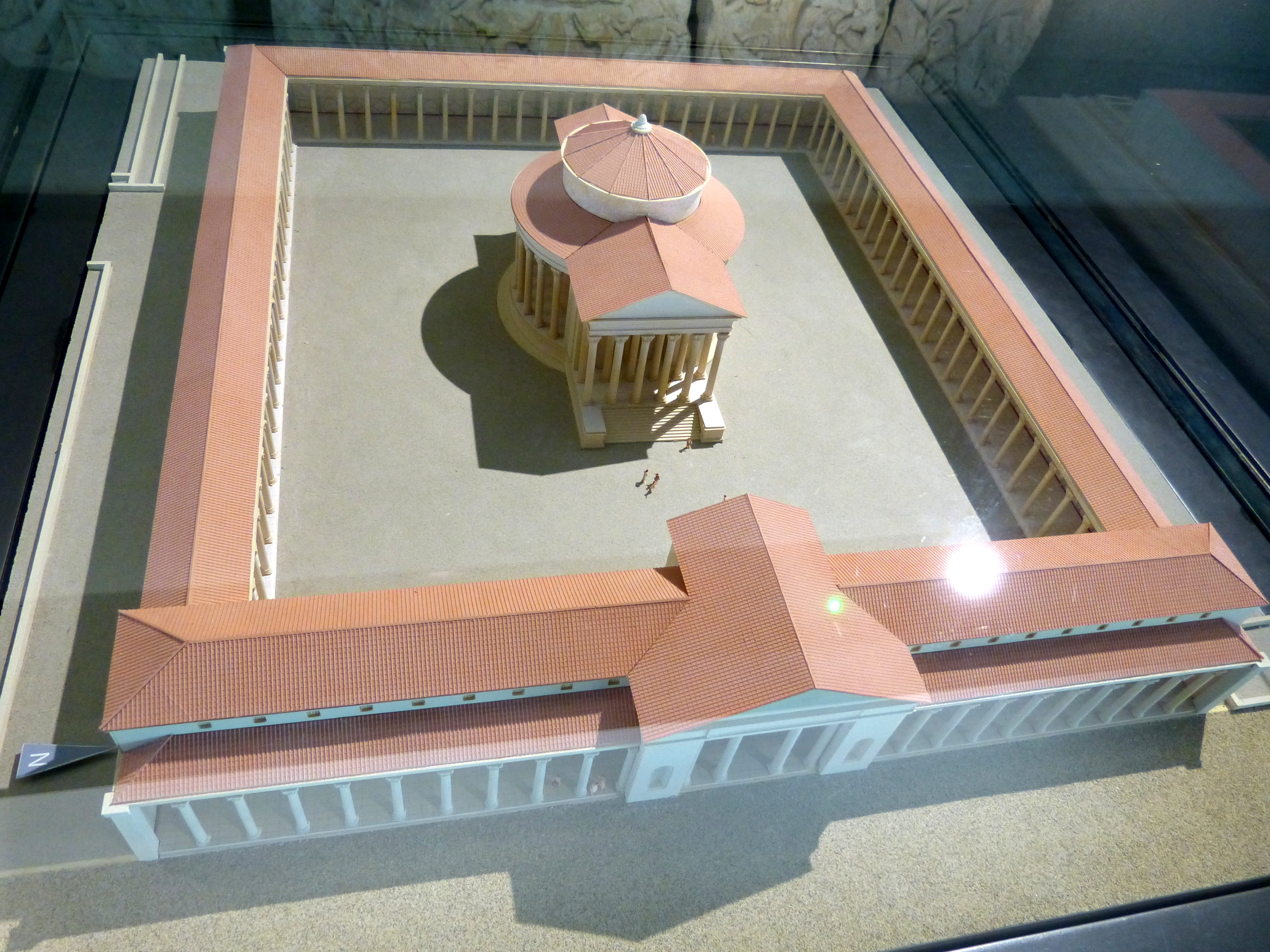
Reconstruction of the Romano-Celtic temple complex at Périgueux

A Romano-Celtic temple or fanum is a sub-class of Roman temples which is found in the north-western Celtic provinces of the Roman Empire. It was the centre of worship in the Gallo-Roman religion. The architecture of Romano-Celtic temples differs from classical Roman conventions, and archeological evidence demonstrates continuity with pre-Roman Celtic forms. Many temples were built on sites which had been sacred to the Celtic religion before the Roman conquest.

== Terminology ==
In English historical literature, the term Romano-British temple is used for temples in Britain, while the term Gallo-Roman temple is used for sites in Gaul.

In French, Spanish, Italian and German scholarship, Celtic temples of the Roman empire are called fanums. This term is borrowed from the Latin word for the sacred plot of land on which a temple was built.

The Gaulish term for these temples was nemeton, and originally signified a sacred grove. This term was used to refer to Celtic temples until the Christianization of Gaul.

== Layout and location ==
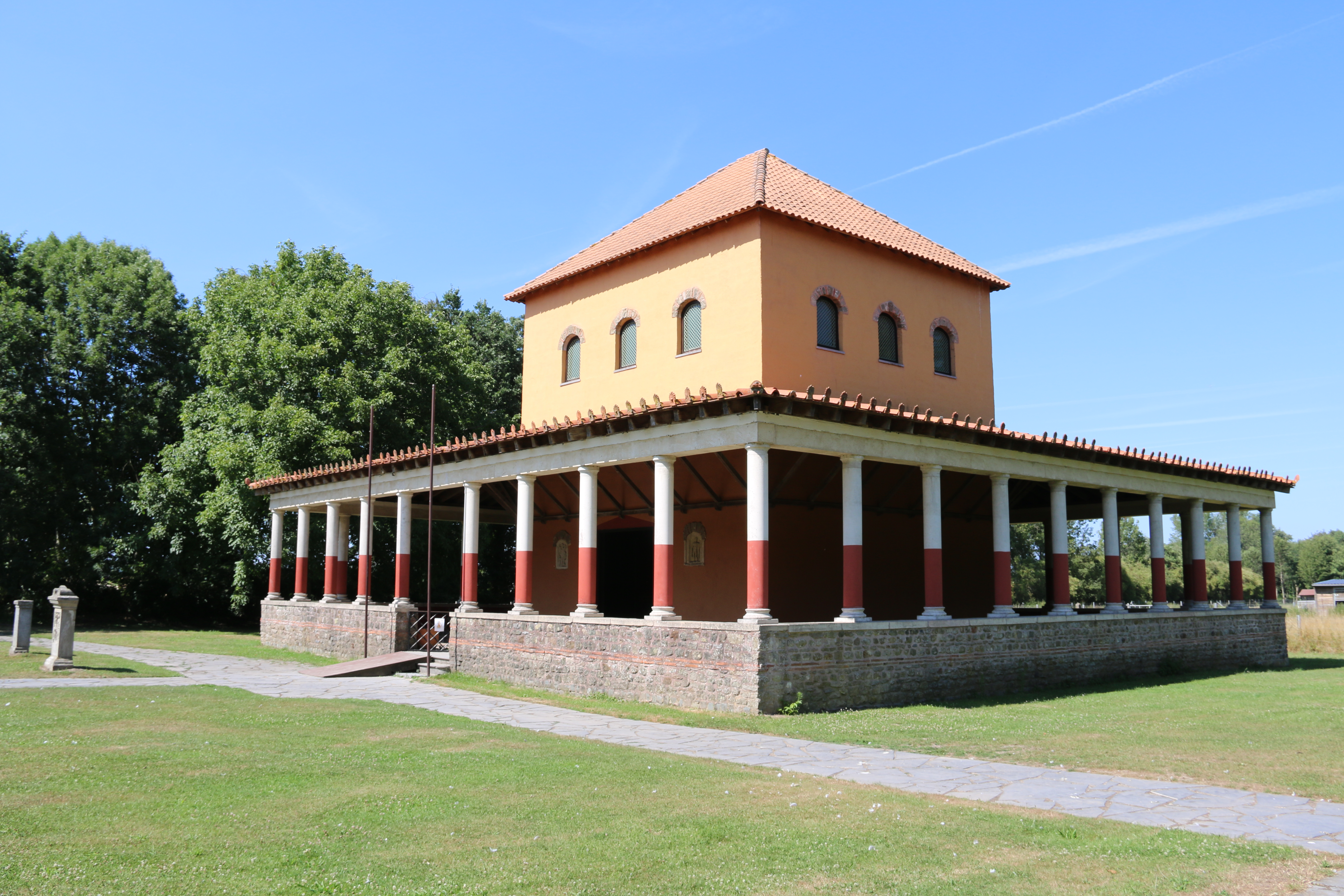
Reconstruction of a Romano-Celtic temple in Aubechies, Belgium

The layout of a Romano-Celtic temple differed from classical Roman temples. While classical temples were rectangular buildings with a portico, a Romano-Celtic temple was square or octagonal, with an ambulatory. This convention is believed to have derived from earlier Celtic wooden temples; many buildings show continuity in their layout from older temples built at the same site. The ambulatory was probably meant to accommodate the Celtic rite of circumambulation. While most classical temples were built at towns and cities, almost all 650 Romano-Celtic temples were built in the countryside or smaller settlements.

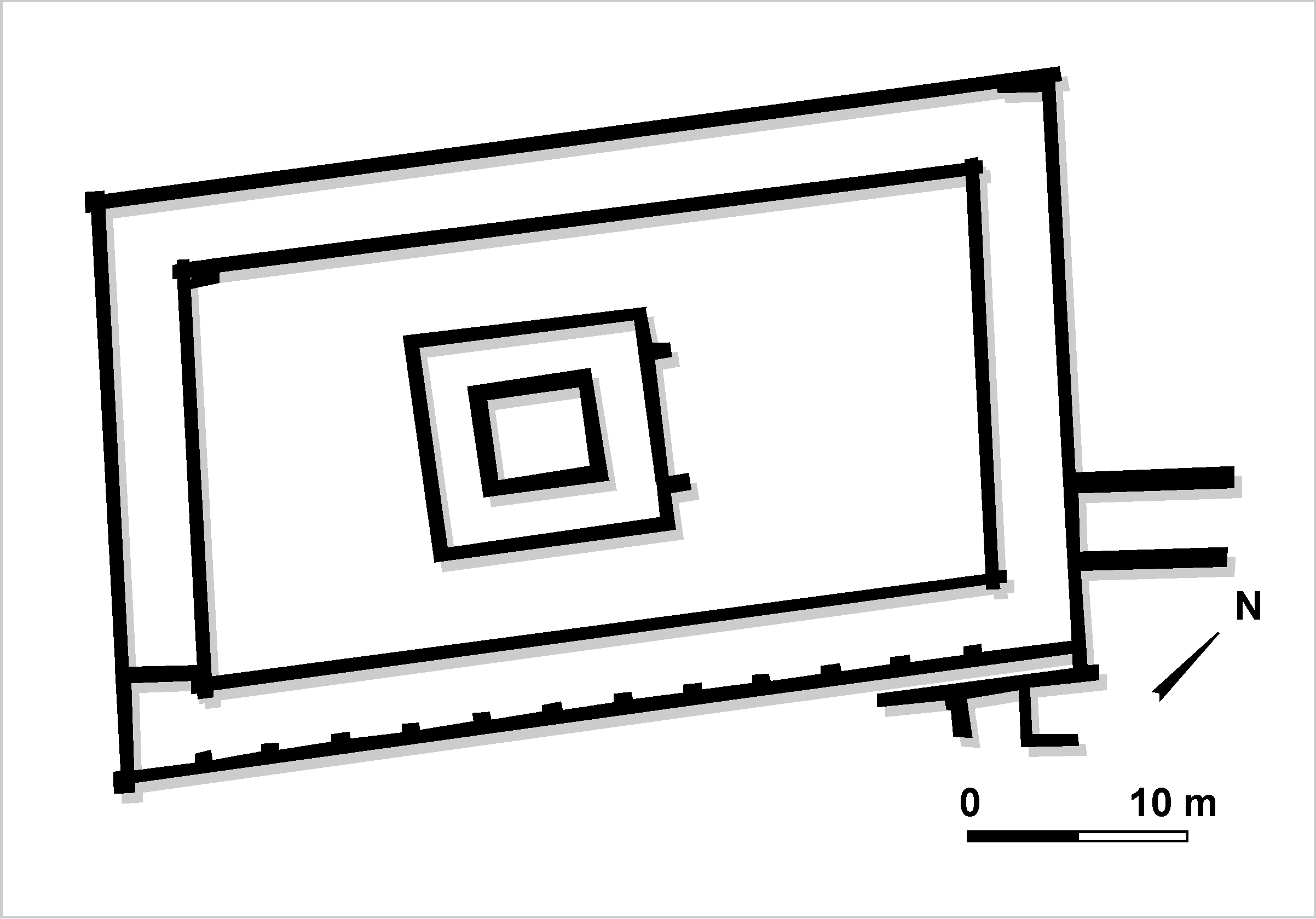
Plan of the Romano-Celtic temple with its sacred enclosure in Colonia Ulpia Traiana (Xanten)

A Roman-Celtic temple consisted of a box-like or tower-like main room (cella), of variable height, surrounded by an ambulatory or veranda built from stone, wood or both. The layout of these complexes were usually square or octagonal, but were sometimes circular or triangular as well. Their sizes vary greatly, with the outer ambulatory ranging from 8.5m to 22m in length and the cella from 5.1m to 16m.

The cella, accessible from a door on one side, was usually roofed, as was the ambulatory, and the cella tower often rose above the height of the surrounding ambulatory or was pitched so that the two join together. Ambulatories were often open, but they were also frequently enclosed by a short wall or wall-and-colonnade. Some features of Classical Roman temples were incorporated in the construction, such as Roman-style columns in the outer wall.

The internal spaces featured mosaic floors and decorative wall paintings.

The main temple building usually stood within a sacred enclosure (temenos) along with other religious structures, which was usually marked off by a wall, palisade and ditch.

== Religious function ==
Votives from the Forest of Halatte Temple

Temples, as centres of religious ceremonies and festivals, attracted people from surrounding areas. Each temple was dedicated to one or more gods, with a statue in the cella. Votive objects such as coins, pottery, statues, miniature votive figurines were offered both within the building and in the surrounding ambulatory and temenos, which suggests that access may have been available throughout the structure and that the external architectural components also served a purpose in the ritual environment of the temple. The temple at Woodeaton produced archeological evidence of multiple hearths within the temple superstructure, suggesting that fire was used in religious worship at this site.

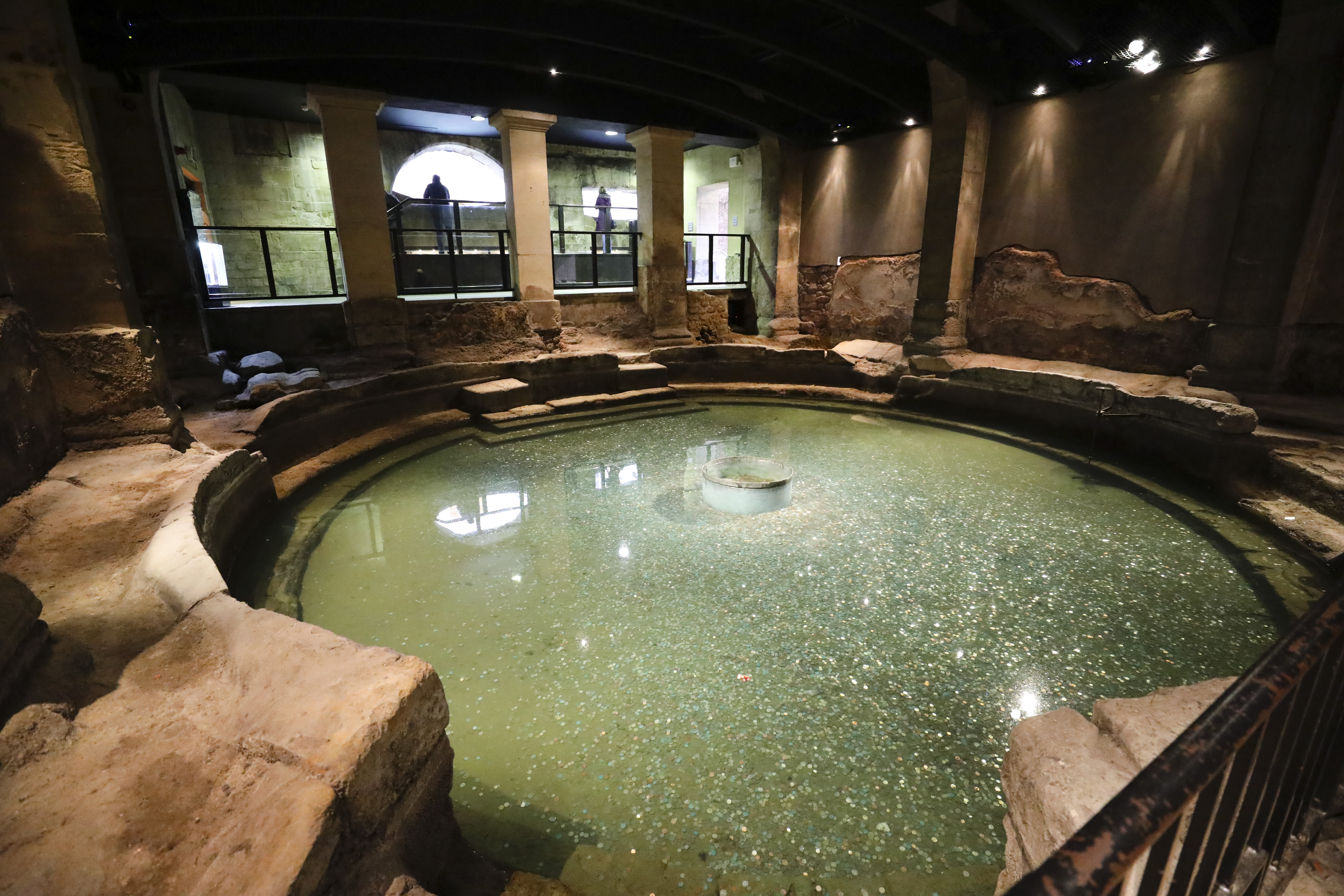
Coins in the frigidarium of Aquae Sulis in Bath.

Priests performed religious ceremonies within the temple or outside in the enclosure, although the exact daily role they played in Romano-Celtic temples is not well understood. Performing sacrifices, prayers, and overseeing festivals were key features of priesthoods throughout the Roman Empire. In Aquae Sulis (modern Bath, England), an altar was dedicated by a haruspex; this religious role may have existed elsewhere in Britannia as well. Fragments of priestly regalia have been found in British excavations: a copper alloy sceptre-cap from the temple at Farley, a chained headpiece or "crown" at Wanborough and a bronze crown with an adjustable band at Hockwold cum Wilton.

== In Gaul ==
Gallo-Roman temples have been found throughout the region settled by the ancient Gauls, including France, Belgium, Luxembourg, Switzerland, Germany, in both cities and the countryside. These temples would have been closed at the end of the 4th century by late Roman imperial anti-pagan laws, but many had already been slowly abandoned during the preceding period, their cults having been neglected or the locality depopulated.

Many of these temples evolved from pre-Roman temples which were built in wood and then gradually embellished. The sanctuaries of Ribemont-sur-Ancre, Corent, and Saint-Georges Abbey in Boscherville are good examples that show how Celtic temples evolved. Excavations conducted by Jacques Le Maho at the site of Saint-Georges Abbey uncovered the remains of many temples: the oldest was a wooden temple without an enclosure, followed by a second temple with an enclosure, and then by a wooden temple built on a stone platform, and then finally, the fourth building was a stone fanum with an enclosure.

One of the largest remaining Gallo-Roman temples is the Tower of Vesunna, which was built in Périgueux, France. It was dedicated to the goddess Vesunna of the Petrocorii tribe. The architecture demonstrates a synthesis of local and Classical traditions, comprising a Celtic cella and a Roman pronaos surrounded by a low enclosure.

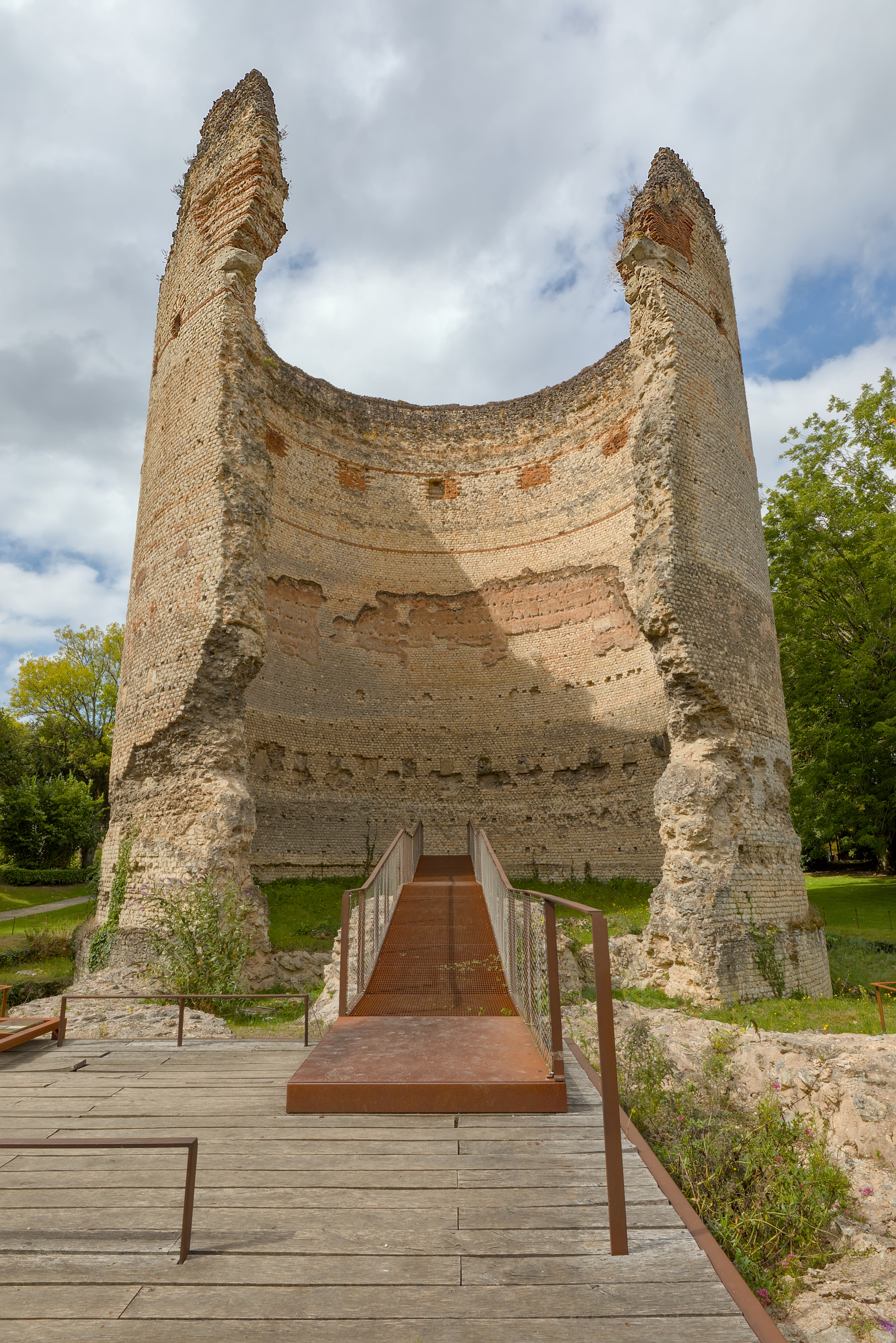
Remains of the Tower of Vesunna

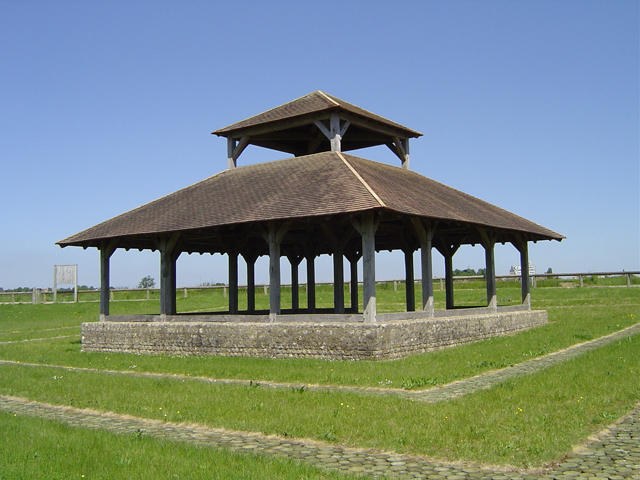
Reconstructed model of Oisseau-le-Petit Fanum

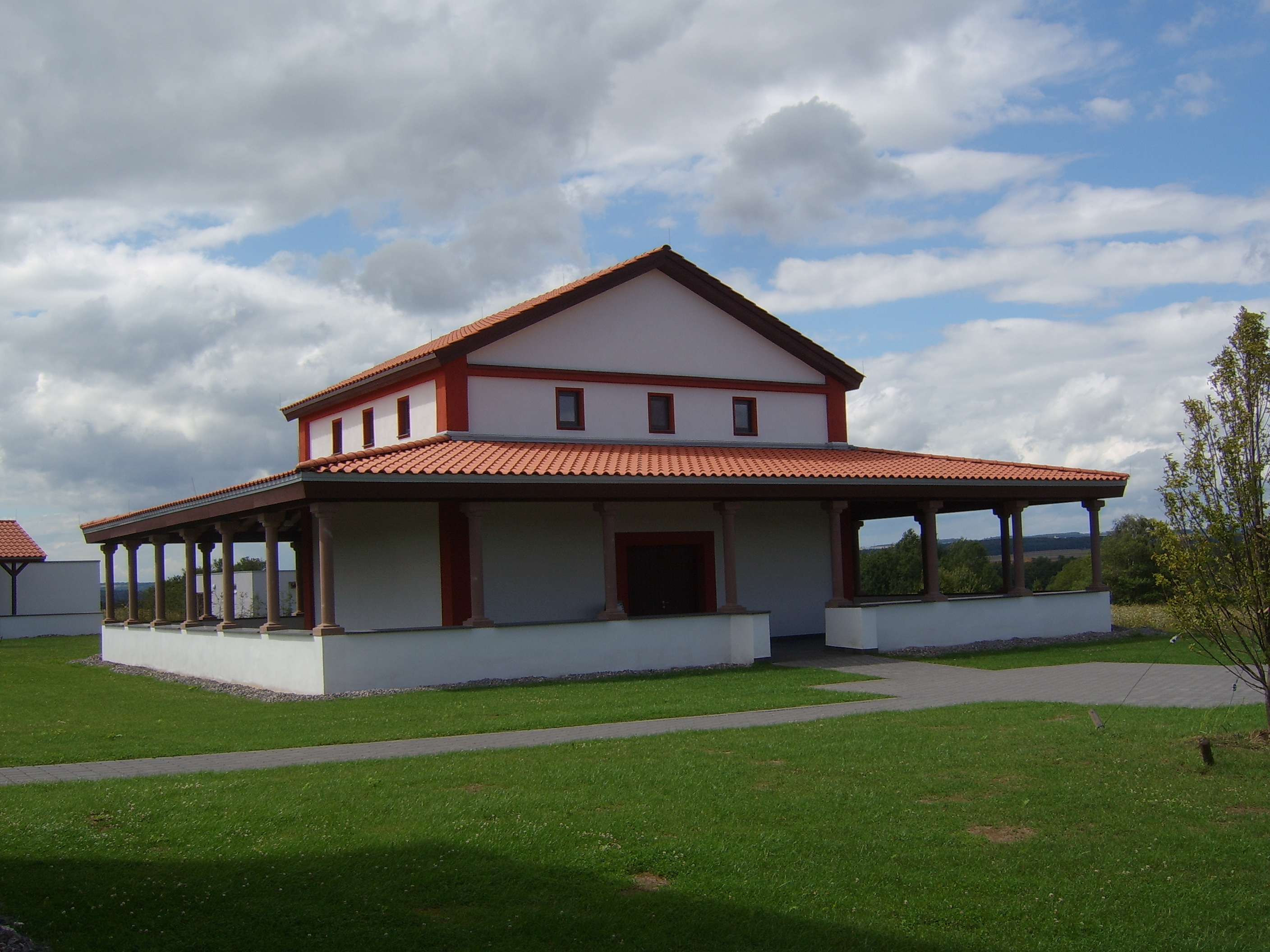
Reconstruction of a Gallo-Roman temple in the Eifel, Germany

=== Gallo-Roman Temples ===
- Tower of Vesunna in Périgueux, France
- Fanum d'Aron in Aurillac, France
- Gallo-Roman temple of Izernore, Ain, France
- Gallo-Roman Temple of Tours
- Pièces-Grandes sanctuary in Margerides, France
- Forest of Halatte Temple in Ognon, France
- Moulin du Fâ Temple in Barzan, France

== In Britain ==
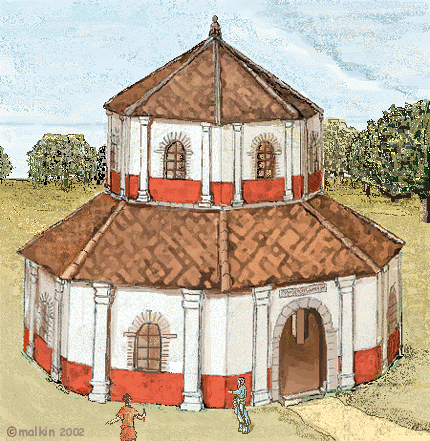
Reconstruction drawing of Pagans Hill Romano-Celtic temple.

Far more Celtic temples have been found in Roman Britain than Classical Roman Temples. The only known example of Classical temples are the Temple of Claudius in Colchester, the temple of Sulis-Minerva in Bath, and other sites at Maryport, Lincoln, Gloucester, and St.Albans .

Romano-Celtic temples were built across Britannia and are frequently associated with sites with recorded pre-Roman activity, such as at Jordan Hill. Temples were located in extra-mural settlements near a fort, as at Vindolanda, or along roadsides. Prominent places within a landscape were also chosen as sites for Romano-Celtic temples, such as on top of a hill like the huge Iron Age Hillfort at Maiden Castle, Dorset or on a coastal promontory such as at Brean Down, Somerset. Temples were built in both major and minor towns as well as rural sanctuaries. In towns they have been found built as both individual temples and in groups of two or more within an enclosure. At least seven temples have been identified at Camulodunum (Roman Colchester), several of which can be linked to specific deities identified with statues and inscriptions found at the sites.

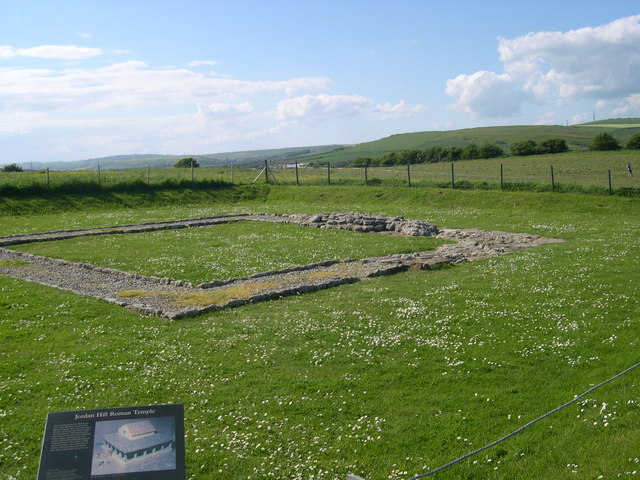
Jordan Hill Romano-Celtic Temple

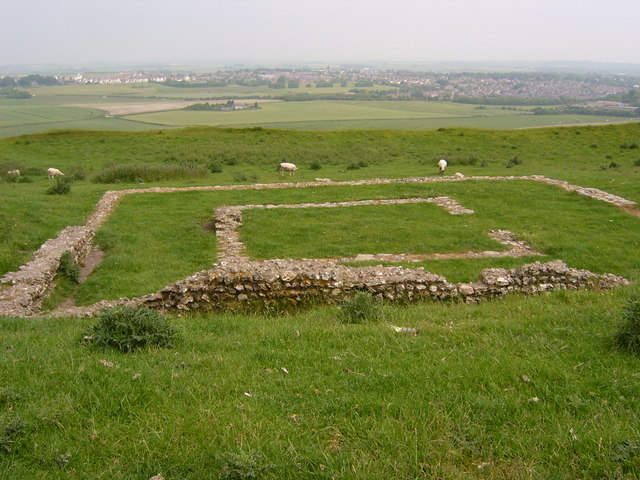
Romano-Celtic temple at Maiden Castle

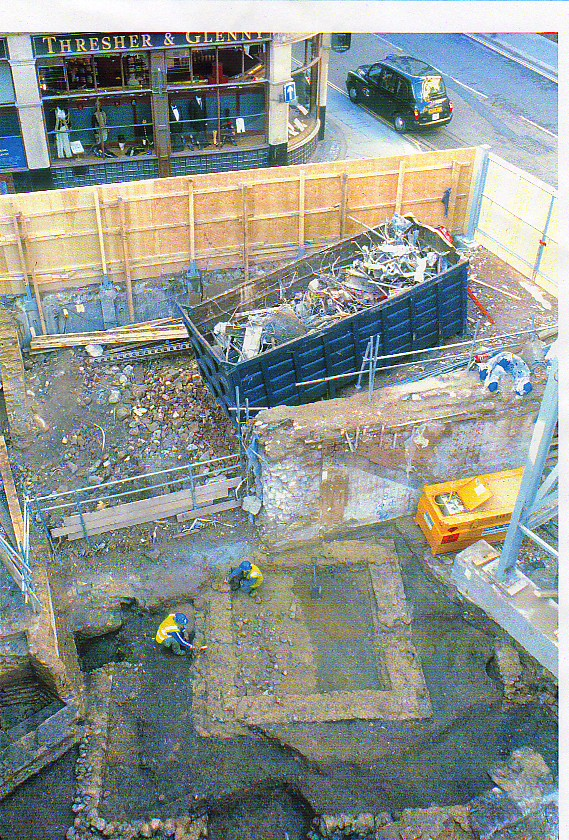
Romano-Celtic temple uncovered at 56 Gresham Street, London

List of Romano-Celtic Temples in Britain
Site name Alternative name(s)	Date	Location	Dimensions	Notes
Bourton Grounds	2nd - 4th Century AD		Cella: 7.6m^{2}	Excavated in the 1960s. Possibly dedicated to Isis. A Figurine of Isis found by metal detector at a later date.
Brean Down	4th Century AD			Excavated in 1957-8, the temple was constructed c.AD340 and demolished c.AD390. It lies on a promontory off the Somerset coast.
Caerwent	4th Century AD		Cella: 7.5m x 7m	Built in c.AD330, it stood next to the forum and basilica.
Chanctonbury	3rd-4th Century AD	50.896258°N 0.38177312°W	Cella: 9m x 7m	Built on an Iron Age hillfort.
Farley	1st-4th Century AD	51.193708°N 0.49627427°W	Cella: 7.3m x 7.3m Ambulatory: 14m x 14m Temenos: Diameter - c. 73m	Excavated in 1848 by Martin Tupper, and later in 1926 and definitively in 1939. Pre-Roman coinage of Verica, Epaticcus and Tincommius has been found on the site during early excavations. The temple is associated with two pottery kilns. Finds include a possible Priest's sceptre, two Roman coin hoards, a swan-head handle and pottery.
Gosbecks Farm	mid 2nd-4th Century AD	51.859450°N 1.0435977°W	Cella: 7m x 7m	Excavated in 1842. Dedicated to Camulos. The temple temenos stands at the west and of a much larger walled enclosure stretching 340 metres to the east. The off-central location of the temple has been held to imply that a sacred grove or tree occupied the most important position within the temenos One of at least seven found at Roman Colchester.
Great Chesterford	2nd? - 4th Century AD		Cella: 6.7m x 6.7m	Discovered in 1847 and excavated under the direction of the Hon RC Neville. Two mosaic floors were located in the cella. The temple was re-excavated in 1978.
Jordan Hill	1st - 4th Century AD	50.637547°N 2.4271160°W	Cella: 6.8m^{2} Temenos: 84m^{2}	First Excavated by J. Medhurst in 1843. The structure is in stone, with minimal evidence of an ambulatory. An early 1st century pit or shaft was associated beneath the temples structure.
Lancing	Late 1st - Mid 3rd Century AD		Cella: 6.7m x 6.7m	
Lullingstone	3rd Century AD	51.3640°N 0.1964°W	Cella: 6.4m x 5.1m	Dedicated to Water Deities.
Lydney Park	4th Century AD	51.7207°N 2.5532°W		Dedicated to Nodons. Excavated in the 1920s by Sir Mortimer Wheeler. The site also has evidence of iron ore extraction.
Maiden Castle	4th Century AD	50.694871°N 2.4669376°W	Cella: 6m x 6m	Built on top of an Iron Age hillfort. Possibly dedicated to Minerva.
Nettleton	3rd-4th Century AD	51.490763°N 2.2577696°W		Possibly dedicated to Apollo Cunomaglus.
Pagans Hill	3rd-4th Century AD	51.360732°N 2.6373580°W		Excavated by Philip Rahtz in 1949-53. Possibly dedicated to Mercury, the temple was built in c.AD258 with an octagonal cella, but soon fell into decay. A well is associated with the temple, into which objects were deposited. It was the site of domestic occupation by the 5th century.
Ratham Mill	1st-2nd Century AD	50.851830°N 0.85212269°W	Cella: 4m x 4m Ambulatory: 8.5m x 8.5m Temenos: 15.5m x 15.5m	No excavation; site seen as cropmarks. Roman pottery associated in surrounding area. Outer two walls may not have southern sides. The inner square (here identified as the cella) may, in fact, be an altar or plinth within a larger structure.
Vindolanda	3rd-4th Century AD	54.991481°N 2.3630965°W	Cella: 5.1m x 5.1m Ambulatory:10.8m x 10.8m	
Wicklewood	1st-4th Century AD	52°35′1.320″N 1°4′51.492″E	Cella: 8.5m x 8.5m	Discovered and excavated in 1959
Wimblington	2nd-3rd Century AD	52.523846°N 0.13699638°E	Cella: 5.6m x 5m Ambulatory: 11m x 11m	Possibly dedicated to Epona. Excavated in 1980s, Wimblington temple comprised a stone and timber cella surrounded by a timber enclosure. Cropmarks hint at a larger earthwork surrounding the temple c50m in diameter. Finds associated with the temple site included a clay figurine of a horse (Epona?), while surface finds included various copper alloy items possibly linked to Mercury, Minerva and others.
Woodeaton	1st-4th Century AD	51.808933°N 1.2236703°W	Cella: 5.8m x 5m Temenos: 45m^{2}.	Excavated in 1952, the temple was found to have to main phases of use. In the first a clay floor and three internal hearths noted. The later phase is marked by the widening of the walls and the addition of an ambulatory. The site is associated with Iron Age activity.

== See also ==
- Religion in ancient Rome
- Roman Britain
- Roman Gaul
- Gallo-Roman Religion
- Ancient Celtic religion
- Syncretism
- Roman Temple

== Bibliography ==
- Budei, Julia. 2016. Gallorömische Heiligtümer. Neue Studien zur Lage und den räumlichen Bezügen. Mainz/Ruhpolding: Verlag Franz Philipp Rutzen.
- Fauduet, Isabelle. 1993. Les temples de tradition celtique en Gaule romaine. Paris: Éditions Errance.
- Lewis, M.J.T. 1966. Temples in Roman Britain (Cambridge Classical Studies). Cambridge: Cambridge University Press.
- Lobüscher, Thomas. 2002. Tempel- und Theaterbau in den Tres Galliae und den germanischen Provinzen. Ausgewählte Aspekte. Rahden: Leidorf.
- Mukelroy, K. 1976. "Enclosed Ambulatories in Romano-Celtic Temples in Britain". Britannia Vol.7 pp. 173–191.
