= Wicklewood Roman Temple =

Archaeological site in Wicklewood, Norfolk, England

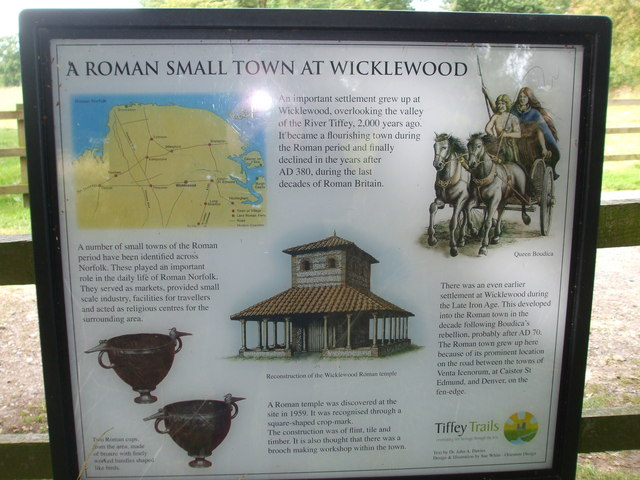
- Information board at a nearby picnic site

- Location within Norfolk
- 52°35′1.320″N 1°4′51.492″E
- Type: Romano-Celtic temple
- Location: near Wicklewood
- OS grid reference: TG 08825 02885

Scheduled monument
- Designated: 11 June 1975
- Reference no.: 1020862

Wicklewood Roman Temple is the site of a Romano-Celtic temple near Wicklewood and about 1.5 miles (2.4 km) north-west of Wymondham, in Norfolk, England. It is a scheduled monument.

== Description ==
The site was discovered in 1959 from cropmarks, and a partial excavation took place in August of that year.

=== Temple ===
The buried remains of a temple were found. It was a rectangular building, about 15 metres (49 ft) north to south by 17 metres (56 ft) west to east. There was a cella (an inner chamber), about 8.5 metres (28 ft) square, built of mortared flint rubble; internally the walls were plastered, and were painted with a design in yellow and black on a red ground. In the centre there was probably a statue, as the remains of its base, diameter about 1.8 metres (5 ft 11 in), were found. There was a mosaic, of which tesserae were found. There was once a clay hearth.

Around the cella was an ambulatory, widest on the east side where there would have been an entrance.

=== Surrounding area ===
The temple evidently served an adjacent settlement, as many Roman objects, such as pottery fragments, coins, brooches and figurines, dating from the first to fourth centuries A.D. have been found near the temple. Some of the brooches are ornate, suggesting that they were votive offerings. A Roman metalworking area has been found nearby, and pieces of scrap metal and slag. The settlement probably existed before the Roman period, as finds include coins and other metal objects from the late Iron Age.
