= Forest of Halatte Temple =

Gallo-Roman temple remains

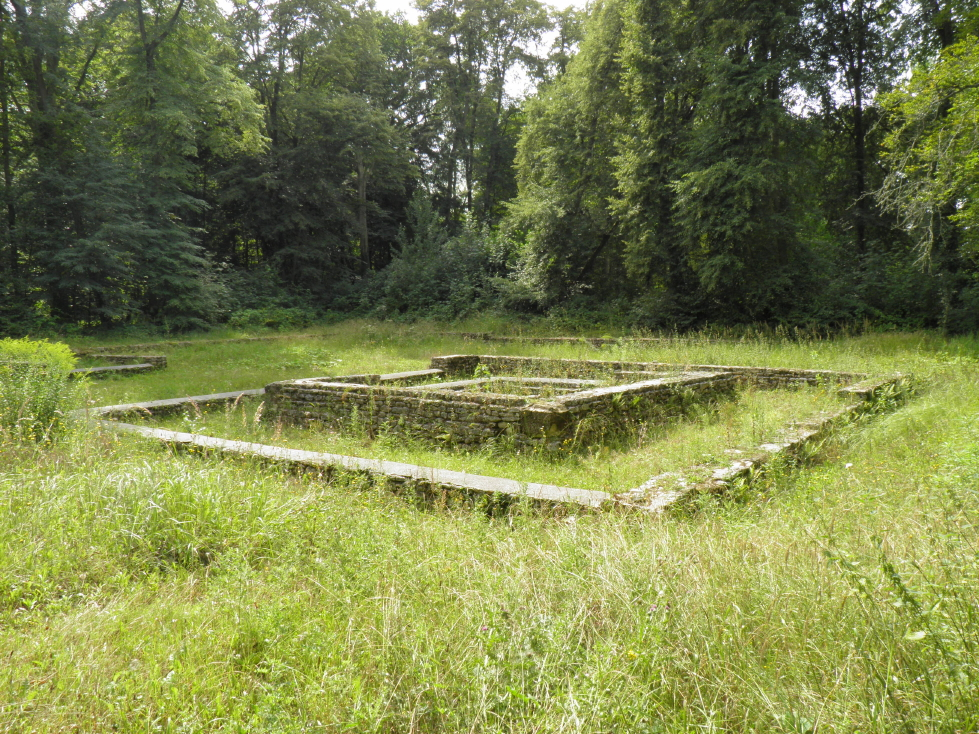
- Remains of the temple's cella.

- Location within France
- 49°14′32″N 2°37′33″E
- Type: Romano-Celtic Temple
- Periods: Classical Antiquity
- Cultures: Silvanectes, Gallo-Roman
- Location: Villers-Saint-Frambourg-Ognon
- Region: Hauts-de-France

History
- Built: 1st century
- Abandoned: 5th Century

Site notes
- Excavation dates: 1873–1874, 1996, 1999
- Condition: Ruined
- Public access: Yes

Monument historique
- Designated: 2007

The Forest of Halatte Temple is a Gallo-Roman temple ruin located in the heart of the Forest of Halatte in the Villers-Saint-Frambourg-Ognon commune (Oise) near Senlis.

The temple's foundation walls, which rise from around 0.5 m to 1 m, are still visible at the site, allowing the appreciation of its original extent and layout. The site is open to the public.

== History ==
The area was initially a Celtic cult site featuring a wooden structure, pallisades, and megaliths. Offerings found from that period include a severed head, vessel, and Celtic coinage.

The stone temple was later erected around the middle of the 1st century, and frequented for healing votives. It was abandoned at the start of the 5th century, after Christianization. The temple was then quarried for its stone, and reclaimed by the forest.

The temple was designated a historic monument in 2007.

== Archaeology ==
The site was first excavated between 1873 and 1874, and again in 1996 and 1999. Its artifacts are displayed at the Senlis Museum of Art and Archeology.

Objects unearthed through excavations include coins, votives, fibulae and other jewelry, as well as animal bones, demonstrating how the site was frequented by a devout populace for the purpose of making offerings.

Most of the coins found are bronze; 42 are Celtic, while over a thousand are Roman coins dating from Tiberius to Gratian and Magnentius.

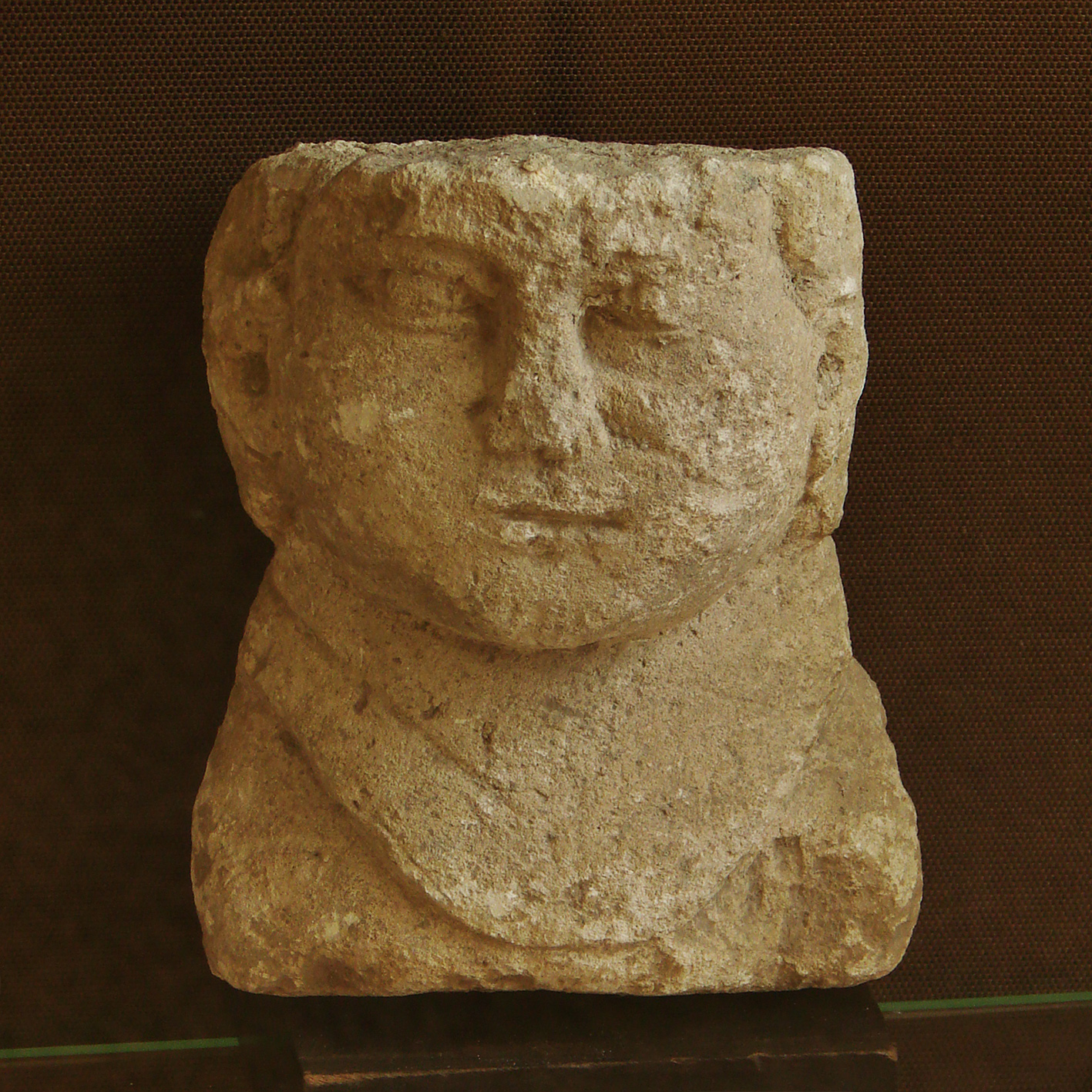
An ex-voto sculpture.

Votives from the Halatte Forest.

== See also ==
- Forest of Halatte
- Romano-Celtic temple
- Roman Gaul
- Silvanectes

== Bibliography ==
- Berdeaux-Le Brazidec, Marie Laure (2000). "Catalogue sommaire des monnaies romaines du sanctuaire de la forêt d'Halatte (Oise) par secteurs". Revue archéologique de Picardie. 18: 233–255.
- Popineau, Jean-Marc (2016). "Les Sulbanectes, peuple gaulois à l'origine de Senlis". Archéologia (in French). 546: 61. ISSN 0570-6270.
