= List of future transport developments in the East of England =

A list of proposed, planned and under construction transport developments in the East of England region in a sortable table. Following the 2010 general election the new government's Comprehensive Spending Review, many unstarted projects have been reassessed for feasibility, with an eye to save money due to the late 2000s recession. Some schemes have since been given a go ahead, or cut from plans, however many are still waiting till January 2011 to know what decisions have been reached on them.

Scheme	Mode	County	Status	Primary sponsor	Estimated construction start date	Estimated completion date	Estimated cost (£m)	Note
Colchester Rapid Transit	Bus	Essex	under construction	Colchester City Council	Early 2024	Mid 2025	£99.9	
London Stansted Airport expansion	Air	Essex	cancelled	BAA Limited		2017	£2,500	
Thames estuary airport	Air	Essex	aspiration	Greater London Authority			£7,600 - 13,900	
Luton to Dunstable Busway	Bus	Central Bedfordshire	approved	Luton Borough Council	Early 2010	2012	£84	
Luton Town Centre Transport Scheme	Multi-modal	Luton	Pre-qualification pool	Luton Borough Council	Early 2010	Late 2012	£26.8	
Cambridge Gateway	Multi-modal	Cambridgeshire	approved	Cambridgeshire County Council	Dec 2010	2012	£3.14	plus cost of Hills Road Bridge Cycle Lane
Cambridgeshire Guided Busway	Bus	Cambridgeshire	completed	Cambridgeshire County Council	March 2007	mid-2010	£116.2	
Project Cambridge	Multi-modal	Cambridgeshire	cancelled	Cambridgeshire County Council			£25	
A13 Passenger Transport Corridor	Multi-modal	Essex	cancelled	Essex County Council	Early 2010	Spring 2012	£7	
Chelmer Valley Park and Ride	Bus	Essex	cancelled	Essex County Council	March 2010	By March 2011	£7.9	
South Essex Rapid Transit	Bus	Essex	Pre-qualification pool	Essex County Council	2011	Late 2012	£53	
King's Lynn to South Lynn bus and cycle route	Multi-modal	Norfolk	cancelled	Norfolk County Council	June 2010	Sept 2010	£0.85	
Cambridge Cycling Town routes	Cycle	Cambridgeshire	cancelled	Cambridgeshire County Council			£3.6	
Leagrave, new bridge under the main line railway	Cycle	Luton	reserve proposal	Sustrans				
Sawston to Abington cycleway	Cycle	Cambridgeshire	cancelled	Cambridgeshire County Council	Jan 2010		£0.35 - 0.4	
St Neots (Southern) Foot and Cycle Bridge	Cycle	Cambridgeshire	cancelled	Sustrans	2009/10	2010/11	£3.5	
Wicken Fen Vision Spine Route (The Lodes Way)	Cycle	Cambridgeshire	under construction	Sustrans National Trust	March 2010	2013	£2	
Yaxley to Farcet Cycleway	Cycle	Cambridgeshire	cancelled	Cambridgeshire County Council				
Brightlingsea to Alresford	Cycle	Essex	reserve proposal	Sustrans				
West Horndon to Brentwood, the A127 barrier	Cycle	Essex	reserve proposal	Sustrans				
Cheshunt, crossing the A10 to reach the Lee Valley	Cycle	Hertfordshire	cancelled	Sustrans			£1.7	
Royston railway crossing	Cycle	Hertfordshire	cancelled	Sustrans			£3.25	
Norwich, connections to Whitlingham Country Park	Cycle	Norfolk	cancelled	Sustrans			£0.9	
Watton and Griston Link	Cycle	Norfolk	cancelled	Sustrans			£0.25	
East West Rail	Rail	Bedford Cambridgeshire Central Bedfordshire Essex Hertfordshire Norfolk Suffolk	aspiration	East-West Rail Consortium			£530	Rail link connecting the East of England to Southampton and Bristol via Oxford. Oxford-Bedford in place or funded, Bedford-Cambridge "promised".
Thameslink Programme	Rail	Greater London Hertfordshire Luton	Complete	Network Rail	October 2007	2015	£5,500	Completion estimates were delayed to 2018 on 25 November 2010, owing to economic circumstances.
Chesterton Interchange	Rail	Cambridgeshire	cancelled	Cambridgeshire County Council	March 2010	April 2011	£48.1	
Hitchin junction development	Rail	Cambridgeshire	underway	Network Rail	2011	2014	£62.6	
Springfield Railway Station, Chelmsford	Rail	Essex	cancelled	Chelmsford Borough Council		2015 earliest	£45 +	
Route 5 – Power supply enhancements	Rail	Cambridgeshire Essex	cancelled	Network Rail	2011	2012		
West Anglia outer 12-coach trains	Rail	Cambridgeshire Essex	cancelled	Network Rail	2010	2011		involving platform extensions and a new platform at Cambridge
Route 6 – Power supply enhancements	Rail	Essex	cancelled	Network Rail	2011	2012		
12-car capability on the Tilbury Loop and Ockendon Branch	Rail	Essex	cancelled	Network Rail	2011	2011		involving platform extensions
Crossrail	Rail	Essex	under construction	Transport for London, Department for Transport	2009	2017	£15,900	Includes possible works to Brentwood and Shenfield stations
Route 7 – Power supply enhancements	Rail	Essex	cancelled	Network Rail	2011	2012		
Croxley Rail Link	Rail	Hertfordshire	Pre-qualification pool	Hertfordshire County Council	2014-17		£162	
Felixstowe to Nuneaton freight capacity scheme	Rail	Suffolk	cancelled	Network Rail	mid-2009	2014	£291	
A1 Sandy/Beeston Bypass	Road	Central Bedfordshire	aspiration	Highways Agency	2016		£67	
A421 Improvements (M1 Junction 13 to Kingston, Milton Keynes)	Road	Central Bedfordshire Milton Keynes	under construction	Bedfordshire			£28	
M1 Junction 10A	Road	Luton	cancelled	Luton Borough Council				
Luton East Circular Road	Road	Luton	cancelled	Luton Borough Council				
A421 Bedford to M1 Junction 13	Road	Bedford Central Bedfordshire	complete	Highways Agency	October 2008	late 2010	£33	
A5120 Flitwick–Westoning Bypass	Road	Central Bedfordshire	aspiration	Central Bedfordshire Council	2013/14	2015/16	£35	
Bedford & Milton Keynes Waterway	Waterway	Central Bedfordshire	aspiration	British Waterways	2009	2015	£170	Underbridge included in [completed] Bedford bypass construction programme. As of March 2018, no works in progress.
Dunstable Northern Bypass (A5-M1 Link)	Road	Central Bedfordshire	complete	Highways Agency	2016/17		?	
Luton Northern Bypass	Road	Luton	cancelled	Luton Borough Council		before 2016	£95	
M1 Hard shoulder running (J10-13)	Road	Luton Central Bedfordshire	under construction	Highways Agency	2009	2013	£326 - 503	
A142 Ely Southern Bypass	Road	Cambridgeshire	cancelled	Cambridgeshire County Council	2009	2011	£15	
Northstowe Access Link Roads	Road	Cambridgeshire	cancelled	Cambridgeshire County Council			£30	
Mill Road Accident Remedial Scheme	Road	Cambridgeshire	cancelled	Cambridgeshire County Council				
(J28) A12 New Junction at Cuckoo Farm, Colchester	Road	Essex	under construction	Colchester Borough Council	Dec 2009	2011	£25	
Northern Approaches Road, (Colchester)	Road	Essex	cancelled	Colchester Borough Council		2012		LTT 4 Dec 2009, page 17.
A13/A130 Sadlers Farm Junction	Road	Essex	cancelled	Essex County Council	Early 2010	Late 2012	£63	
A120 Braintree to Marks Tey	Road	Essex	withdrawn	Highways Agency			£500	
Chelmer Viaduct	Road	Essex	cancelled	Chelmsford Borough Council	2011		£5	
Army and Navy Junction Improvements	Road	Essex	cancelled	Chelmsford Borough Council	2016		£25-40	
A120 Hare Green to Harwich	Road	Essex	cancelled	Highways Agency	before 2016			
A127 Basildon Enterprise Corridor	Road	Essex	cancelled	Essex County Council	May 2009	March 2011	£14.7	
A414 from M11 Junction 7 to Southern Way, Harlow	Road	Essex	cancelled	Essex County Council	2010	March 2011	£9.9	
Chelmsford North East Bypass	Road	Essex	cancelled	Essex County Council	2014–2016		£229 - 262	
Colchester Central Corridor (A133)	Road	Essex	cancelled	Essex County Council				
Lower Thames Crossing	Road	Essex	aspiration	Department for Transport				
Roscommon Way Extension	Road	Essex	cancelled	Essex County Council	May 2010	Spring 2011	£12.1	
M11 Junctions 6 to 8 Improvements	Road	Essex	withdrawn	Highways Agency			£698	
M11 and A120 Stansted Generation 2 Airport Access	Road	Essex	suspended	Highways Agency			£131	
M25 Jct 23 to 27 Widening	Road	Essex Hertfordshire	approved	Highways Agency	2012	2015/16		
M25 Jct 5 to 6/7 Widening	Road	Essex Hertfordshire	approved	Highways Agency	2012	2015/16		
M25 Junction 30 Improvement	Road	Essex	delayed	Highways Agency	2014/2015			
A602 Corridor Improvements	Road	Hertfordshire	cancelled	Hertfordshire County Council			£14.3 - 15.8	
Watford Junction Station Area Improvements	Road	Hertfordshire	Pre-qualification pool	Hertfordshire County Council			£17.7	
A11 Fiveways to Thetford Improvement Scheme	Road	Norfolk	approved	Highways Agency	2010	2013	£113 - 157	
A47 Acle Straight	Road	Norfolk	cancelled	Highways Agency				
A47 Blofield to North Burlingham Dualling	Road	Norfolk	cancelled	Highways Agency	2011–2012		£37.5	
A47 to A1067 Link Road	Road	Norfolk	aspiration	Norfolk County Council				
A140 Long Stratton Bypass	Road	Norfolk	aspiration	Norfolk County Council				
Great Yarmouth Third River Crossing	Road	Norfolk	cancelled	Norfolk County Council	2013	2015	£80 - 180	New bridge or tunnel
Norwich Northern Distributor Road	Road	Norfolk	Completed	Norfolk County Council	2016	2018	£90.7	
A14 Copdock interchange (J55)	Road	Suffolk	cancelled	Suffolk County Council				
A14 Ellington to Fen Ditton	Road	Suffolk	cancelled	Highways Agency	2012	Winter 2015/2016	£1,300	
A12 Improvements at Farnham, Stratford, Glenham and Marlesford	Road	Suffolk	aspiration	Suffolk County Council		2025		
B1115 Stowmarket Relief Road	Road	Suffolk	under construction	Suffolk County Council	June 2008	Spring 2010	£21	
Beccles Southern Link Road	Road	Suffolk	aspiration	Suffolk County Council			£3.5	
Beccles loop	Rail	Suffolk	proposal	Network Rail			£0.5 - 4	
Ipswich Wet Dock Crossing	Road	Suffolk	proposal	Ipswich Borough Council		2018	£28	
Ipswich Northern Bypass	Road	Suffolk	proposal	Ipswich Borough Council	2016 Earliest		£90	
East Bank Link Road	Road	Suffolk	aspiration	Ipswich Borough Council				
Duke Street Junction Improvements	Multi-modal	Suffolk	Suffolk County Council					
North Lowestoft Access Project	Road	Suffolk	aspiration	Suffolk County council				
Great Yarmouth Outer Harbour	Sea	Norfolk	under construction	EastPort UK	June 2007		£75	Container port with proposed ferry routes
Felixstowe South	Sea	Suffolk	under construction	Port of Felixstowe	May 2008	2014		new container ship terminal
Bathside Bay	Sea	Essex	cancelled	Harwich International Port			£300	new container ship terminal
London Gateway	Sea	Essex	Under construction	DP World	2008	2011	£1,500	New container port
Cambridgeshire TIF bid	Multi-modal	Cambridgeshire	cancelled	Cambridgeshire County Council			£500	
King's Lynn South Transport Major Scheme	Multi-modal	Norfolk	proposal	Norfolk County Council	mid-2009	2011	£7	
Ipswich - Transport Fit for the 21st Century	Multi-modal	Suffolk	Approved	Suffolk County Council	2012	2014	£25	
Harlow First Avenue Multi-modal corridor	Multi-modal	Essex	cancelled	Essex County Council	April 2009	February 2010	£4.4	
