= Transport in East Anglia =

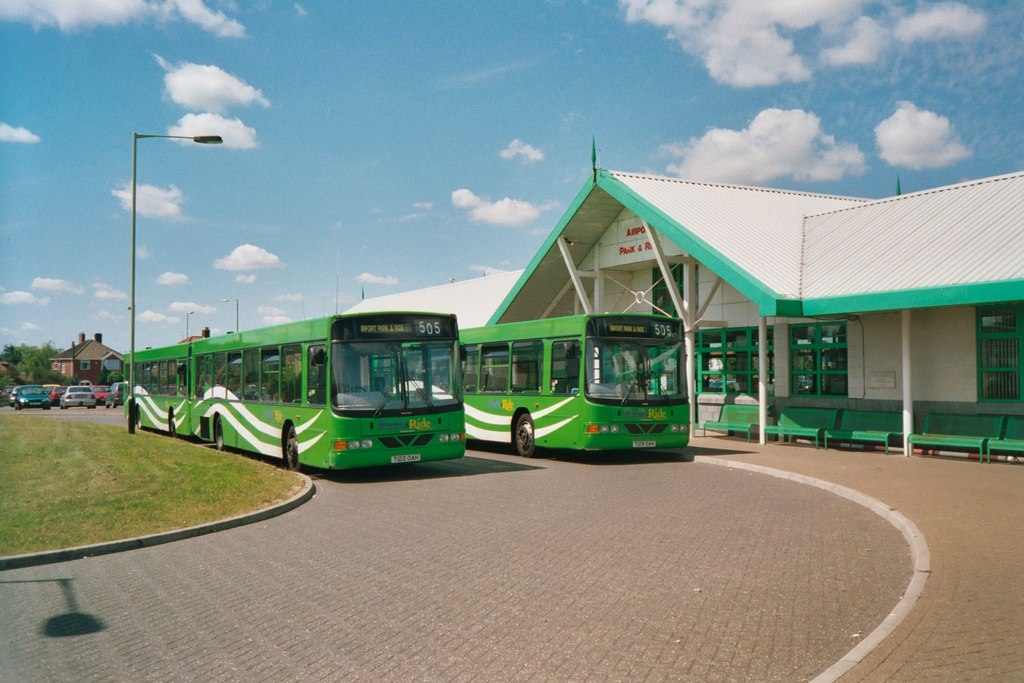
Norwich park and ride terminal at Norwich Airport

Transport in East Anglia consists of extensive road and rail networks as well as one of England's key regional airports and the country's busiest container port. Despite having very little motorway within their borders, the counties of Suffolk, Norfolk and Cambridgeshire have modern transport links with the rest of the country.

== Airports ==
Norwich Airport is the major passenger airport within East Anglia. In 2011 it was the 25th busiest airport in the United Kingdom and deals with over 400,000 passengers a year. Airlines operating from the airport include KLM, Loganair and TUI Airways. Destinations served by the airport include Amsterdam Airport Schiphol, a major European and world hub airport, and domestic locations such as Exeter and Aberdeen as well as locations in countries such as Spain, Turkey and Greece.

There are a number of other private airfields in the region, including heliports servicing the North Sea oil and gas industry such as at Great Yarmouth – North Denes Airport and at Norwich Airport. Regular flights from Cambridge Airport operated to destinations such as Jersey with occasional flights to other European destinations. All scheduled and charter flights were halted at the end of January 2016 due to a lack of passenger numbers.

Stansted Airport is located just outside the region in north-west Essex. This is the third busiest airport in the UK and the closest major airport to East Anglia.

== Rail ==
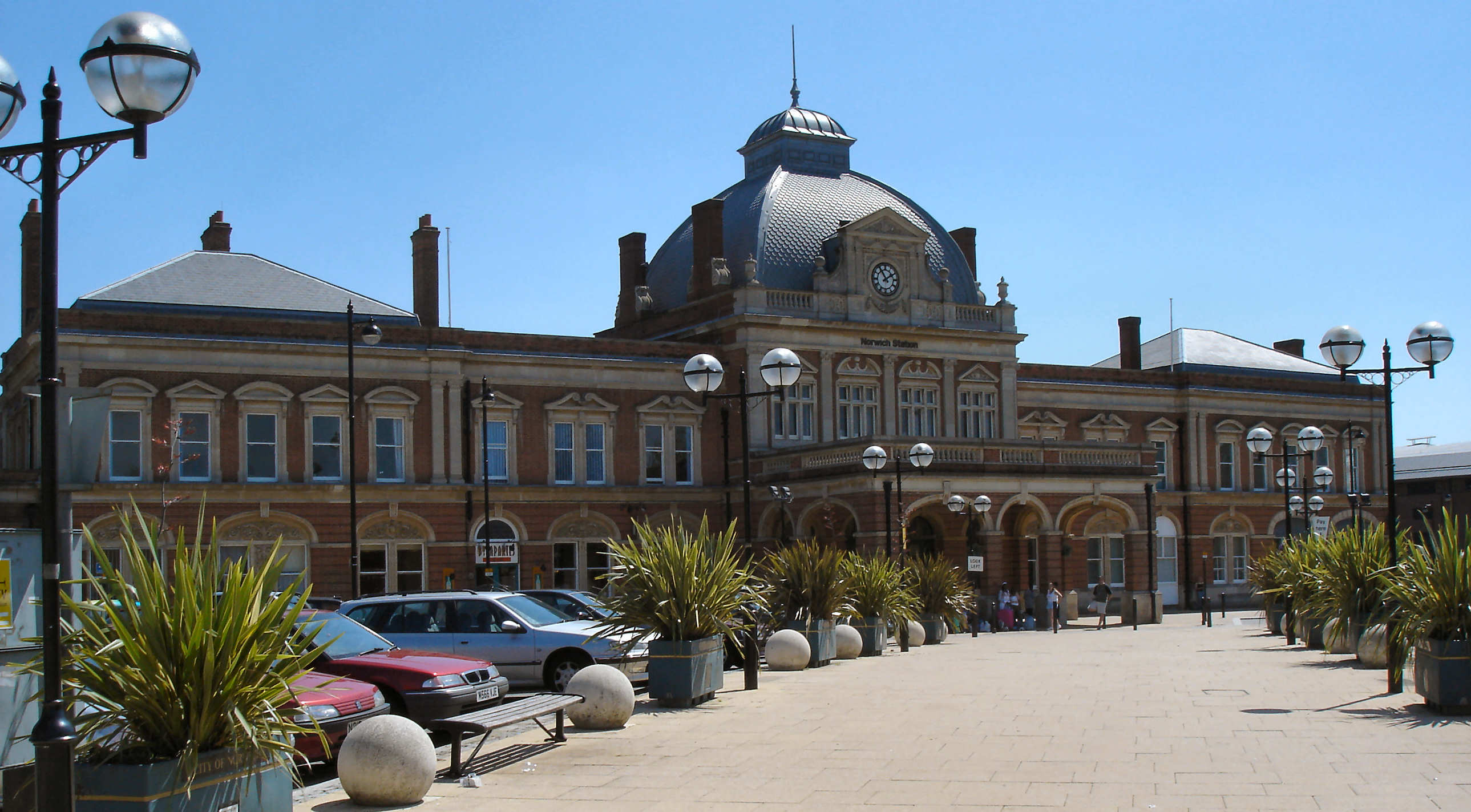
Norwich railway station

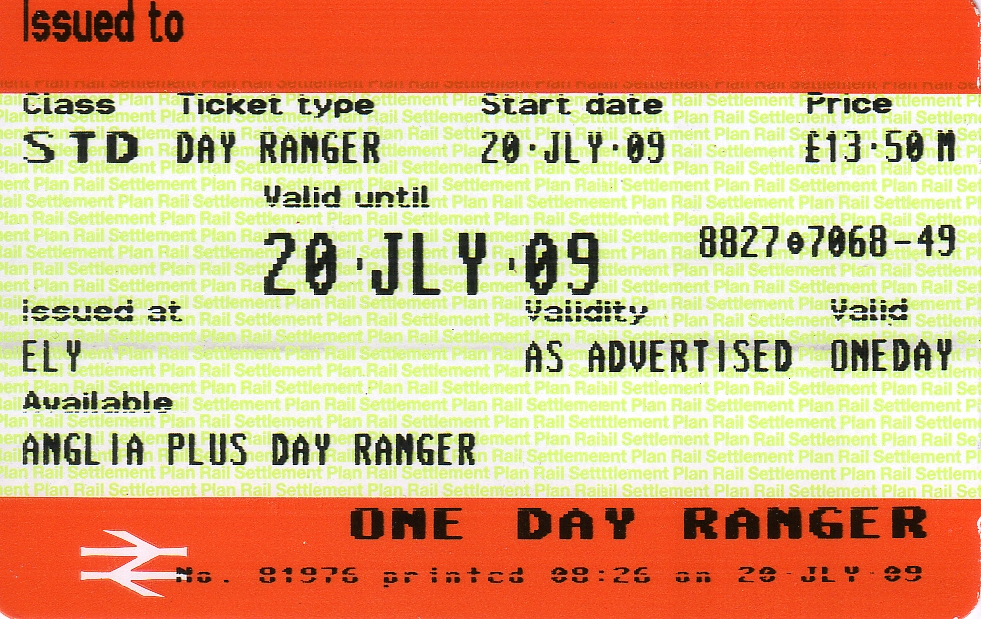
Day ranger travel card

The East Coast Main Line passes through the region with some express trains stopping at Peterborough. Local services on this line also stop at St Neots and Huntingdon. The other Inter City route in the region is the Great Eastern Main Line which has Norwich as its terminus. Major stations in the region on this route include Ipswich, Stowmarket and Diss. Major commuter lines in the region include the West Anglia Main Line which connects Cambridge with London Liverpool Street and the Cambridge Line which connects the city with London King's Cross. These routes all run north–south and connect the region with London and, in the case of the East Coast Main Line, with cities in the north of Britain.

Routes running east–west in the region include connections between Ipswich and Cambridge and onward towards Birmingham New Street and the line connecting Norwich and Liverpool Lime Street via the Midlands. More local routes include the East Suffolk Line, the Wherry Lines and Bittern Line around Norwich, the Felixstowe Branch Line and the Fen Line connecting Cambridge with Kings Lynn.

The majority of services in the region are operated by Abellio Greater Anglia, including all services from London to Norwich. London North Eastern Railway operates services on the East Coast Main Line and Great Northern operates local services on this line and some services through Cambridge. East Midlands Railway operates services from Norwich to Liverpool and CrossCountry runs trains west from the Cambridge area. The Dutchflyer service runs from Cambridge and Lowestoft to the port of Harwich to link with the Stena Line ferry service to Hook of Holland.

A variety of rail freight services run throughout the region. The Port of Felixstowe is a major focus for these with around 830,000 containers travelling by rail in 2013. This equates to over a quarter of all container traffic leaving the port as of early 2013. in June 2013 a new nine track container terminal opened, expanding the number of lines available to 20. The new terminal is the third at the port and the first in the country to be capable of handling 30-wagon trains. Freightliner have a depot at Ipswich station. The Ipswich Railway Chord opened in March 2014. This links the East Suffolk Line with the Great Eastern Main Line at Ipswich, allowing easier access to the national rail network for rail freight from Felixstowe.

== Road ==
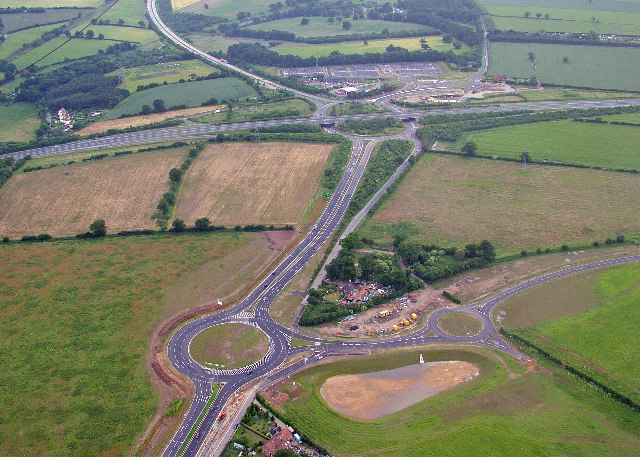
The Thickthorn Interchange on the outskirts of Norwich with the A11 joining the A47 southern bypass

Two small stretches of motorway run through East Anglia, with the end of the M11 south of Cambridge and sections of the A1 in Cambridgeshire and around Peterborough being classed as motorway. Main trunk routes maintained by National Highways in the region include the A1, A11, A12, A14 and A47. A variety of other major roads run through the region, maintained by county councils.

The A14 is particularly significant as an east–west route, linking the Port of Felixstowe with the Midlands and the national motorway network through Cambridgeshire. It has been described as "one of most important and clogged up arteries in Great Britain" and as a key route with "strategic national importance". Proposals to upgrade the route were put forward in 2012 and received government backing in June 2013.

The project was originally planned to include a 25 miles (40 km) toll section between Cambridge and the A1. Local authorities and businesses pledged to contribute at least £100 million towards the improved route, although concerns were raised that the toll would discourage haulage companies off using the route and isolate ports on the Suffolk coast. In December 2013 the plan to fund the road through tolls was dropped with the developments to be funded from general taxation. Work on the project is expected to begin in 2016 and cost £1.5 billion.

=== Bus services ===
Bus services in East Anglia are run by a number of operators. First Eastern Counties is the main operator in Suffolk and Norfolk, while Stagecoach East are the main operator in Cambridgeshire and Peterborough. National Express coach services run from London to major cities in the region including Norwich, Great Yarmouth and Cambridge. A large number of other bus companies run local services throughout the region.

The Cambridgeshire Guided Busway opened in August 2011 as a dedicated bus route linking the centre of Cambridge with Cambridge Science Park, St Ives and Huntingdon. The 13.3 miles (21.4 km) route is believed to be the longest guided busway in the world.

== Cycle routes ==
East Anglia is well suited to cycling with a generally flat landscape. A number of National Cycle Network routes run through the region, including National Cycle Route 1. Provision for cyclists is good in some of the major towns within the region with Cambridge having the highest level of cycle use in the UK with between 18% and 25% of residents travelling to work by bicycle and nearly 50% of residents cycling at least once a week – the highest figure of any town or city in the UK – in a Sport England survey published in 2012.

== Ports ==
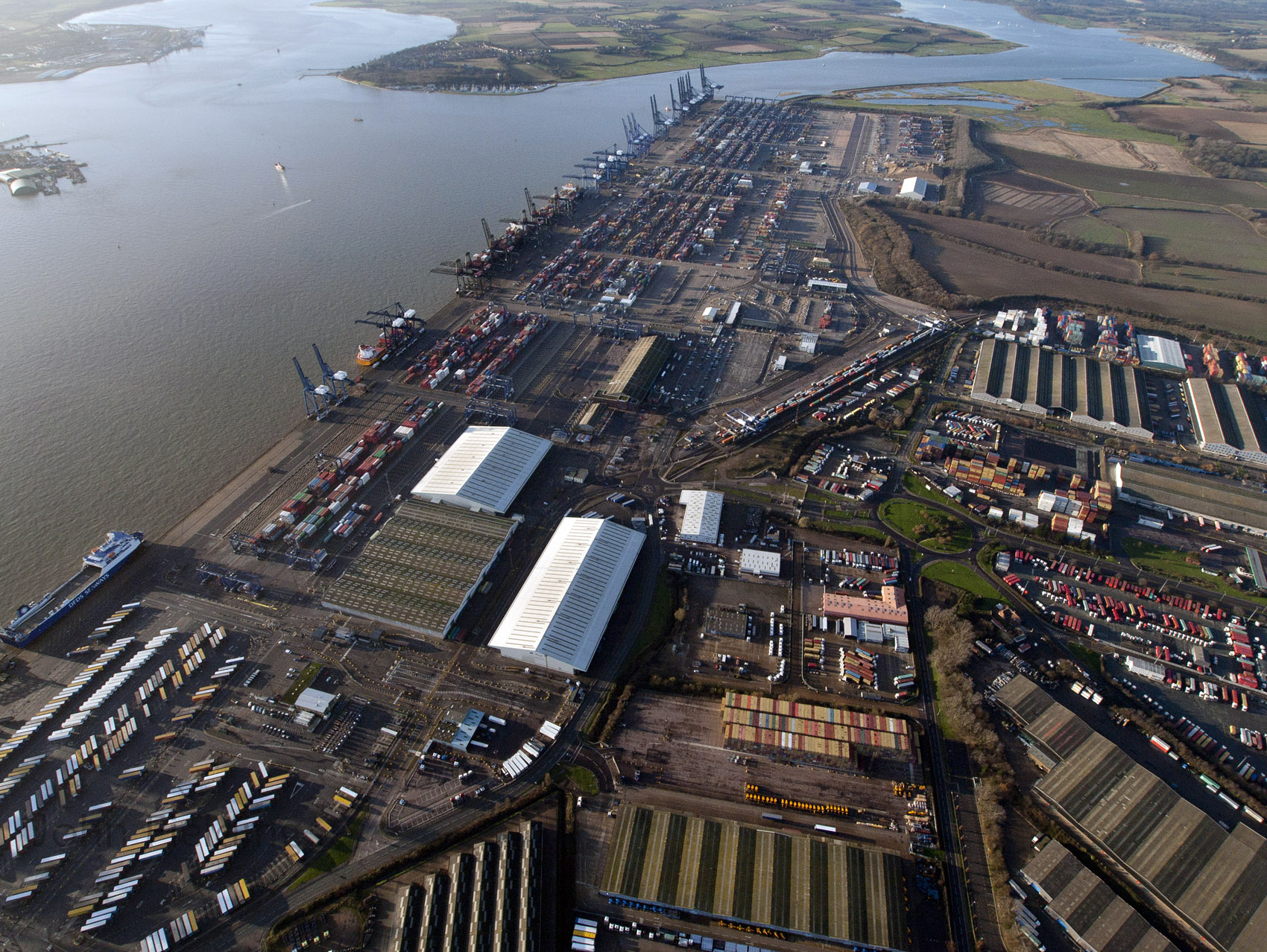
Aerial view of the Port of Felixstowe

The Port of Felixstowe is the busiest container port in the United Kingdom and is a key gateway for container traffic into the country dealing with over 40% of container traffic. The port is operated by Hutchison Ports, a subsidiary of Hutchison Whampoa, and employs over 2500 people as of 2013. A £300 million expansion to the port was completed in 2011 and a new rail terminal opened in June 2013. The A14 provides road links to the port.

Other significant ports in the region include Ipswich docks, the Port of Lowestoft, Great Yarmouth Outer Harbour, King's Lynn Docks and Wisbech Port. Ipswich deals with more than two million tonnes of cargo a year and has freight rail links on site. King's Lynn and Wisbeach are focussed on dealing with agricultural products from the surrounding farmland, whilst Lowestoft and Great Yarmouth play an important role in servicing the North Sea energy industries, including the growing offshore wind energy industry.

A number of smaller ports and leisure harbours, such as at Wells-next-the-Sea and Southwold operate around the region's coast. The major freight and passenger port of Harwich International Port is located just to the south of Felixstowe in Essex. Ferry services run from here to Esbjerg in Denmark and Hook of Holland. Within the region a number of local vehicle and passenger ferry services remain in service, including the Reedham Ferry across the River Yare in Norfolk and the King's Lynn passenger ferry across the River Great Ouse.

== See also ==
- Transport in Cambridge
- Public Transport in Colchester
- Transport in Ipswich
- Road transport in Peterborough
