= 2021 Cambridge City Council election =

Local election in England

← 2019	6 May 2021	2022 →

All 42 council seats up for election 22 seats needed for a majority

	First party	Second party	Third party
Party	Labour	Liberal Democrats	Green
Last election	26	15	0
Seats after	27	12	2
Seat change	▲1	▼3	▲2
	Fourth party
Party	Independents
Last election	1
Seats after	1
Seat change	Steady
- Map showing the results of the 2021 Cambridge City Council election

The 2021 Cambridge City Council election took place on 6 May 2021 to elect members of Cambridge City Council in England. This was on the same day as other nationwide local elections.

== Results summary ==
2021 Cambridge City Council election
Party	Seats	Gains	Losses	Net gain/loss	Seats %	Votes %	Votes	+/−
Labour	27	5	4	▲1	64.3	40.7	44,755	+3.5
Liberal Democrats	12	2	5	▼3	28.6	25.8	28,380	-9.2
Green	2	2	0	▲2	4.8	19.7	21,654	+4.4
Independent	1	1	1	Steady	2.4	2.2	2,410	±0.0
Conservative	0	0	0	Steady	0.0	11.6	12,718	+2.8
Rebooting Democracy	0	0	0	Steady	0.0	0.1	63	New
Workers Party	0	0	0	Steady	0.0	0.1	56	New
UKIP	0	0	0	Steady	0.0	<0.1	55	-1.2

== Ward results ==
Percentages are calculated by dividing the total number of votes by the number of seats available, then dividing the total each candidate received by that number, and multiplied by one-hundred.

=== Abbey ===
Abbey
Party	Candidate	Votes	%
Green	Naomi Bennett	1,178	44.9
Green	Hannah Copley	1,144	43.6
Labour	Haf Davies	1,090	41.5
Green	Matt Howard	1,033	39.4
Labour	Richard Johnson	1,029	39.2
Labour	Nicky Massey	1,014	38.6
Conservative	Timothy Haire	299	11.4
Liberal Democrats	Elizabeth Parkin	270	10.3
Conservative	Geoffrey Owen	236	9.0
Conservative	Paul Roper	234	8.9
Liberal Democrats	Sophie West	199	7.6
Liberal Democrats	Zoe Zhang	149	5.7
Turnout		2,865	38.8
Green gain from Labour			
Green gain from Labour			
Labour hold			

Top-candidate result	%	+/-
Green	41.5	+18.9
Labour	38.4	-11.6
Conservative	10.5	+2.0
Liberal Democrat	9.5	-6.1

=== Arbury ===
Arbury
Party	Candidate	Votes	%
Labour	Carina O'Reilly	1,241	53.0
Labour	Mike Todd-Jones	1,106	47.3
Labour	Patrick Sheil	1,006	43.0
Liberal Democrats	Tim Ward	549	23.5
Green	Tracy Bend	469	20.0
Green	Katrina Barnes	464	19.8
Liberal Democrats	Hannah Whitehouse	439	18.8
Liberal Democrats	Rory Clark	387	16.5
Green	Stephen Lawrence	342	14.6
Conservative	Robert Boorman	339	14.5
Conservative	Rhona Boorman	324	13.8
Conservative	Ian Gregory	293	12.5
Rebooting Democracy	Keith Garrett	63	2.7
Turnout		2,555	39.2
Labour hold			
Labour hold			
Labour hold			

Top-candidate result	%	+/-
Labour	47.8	-1.1
Liberal Democrat	21.1	-3.6
Green	18.1	+2.4
Conservative	13.0	+2.3

=== Castle ===
Castle
Party	Candidate	Votes	%
Labour	Sarah Baigent	938	41.7
Liberal Democrats	Cheney-Anne Payne	854	37.9
Labour	Simon Smith	810	36.0
Liberal Democrats	Caroline Stoddart	768	34.1
Liberal Democrats	Michael Franklin	723	32.1
Labour	Michael Black	675	30.0
Green	Simon Baron	482	21.4
Green	Amber-Page Moss	474	21.1
Green	James Murray-White	323	14.3
Conservative	Paul Fray	241	10.7
Conservative	Mike Haplin	241	10.7
Conservative	Philip Salway	225	10.0
Turnout		2,347	48.3
Labour gain from Independent			
Liberal Democrats hold			
Labour gain from Liberal Democrats			

Top-candidate result	%	+/-
Labour	37.3	+7.9
Liberal Democrat	34.0	-15.9
Green	19.2	+5.2
Conservative	9.6	+2.9

=== Cherry Hinton ===
Cherry Hinton
Party	Candidate	Votes	%
Labour	Mark Ashton	1,354	58.5
Labour	Robert Dryden	1,235	53.3
Labour	Russ McPherson	1,235	53.3
Conservative	Eric Barrett-Payton	541	23.4
Conservative	David Smith	453	19.6
Liberal Democrats	James Hill	387	16.7
Green	Richard Potter	357	15.4
Green	Eli Langfere	333	14.4
Green	Caitlin Patterson	315	13.6
Conservative	Delowar Hossain	280	12.1
Liberal Democrats	Archie McCann	241	10.4
Liberal Democrats	Freddie Poser	215	9.3
Turnout		2,565	39.9
Labour hold			
Labour hold			
Labour hold			

Top-candidate result	%	+/-
Labour	51.3	+1.9
Conservative	20.5	+7.9
Liberal Democrat	14.7	-6.9
Green	13.5	-2.9

=== Coleridge ===
Coleridge
Party	Candidate	Votes	%
Labour	Lewis Herbert	1,289	54.0
Labour	Rosy Moore	1,205	50.4
Labour	Anna Smith	1,067	44.7
Green	Bridget Bradshaw	661	27.7
Green	Sara Lightowlers	498	20.8
Liberal Democrats	Tim Brunton	384	16.1
Conservative	Robert Nelson	383	16.0
Conservative	Gail Kenney	376	15.7
Green	Iain Webb	364	15.2
Liberal Democrats	Peter McLaughlin	331	13.9
Conservative	Linda Yeatman	321	13.4
Liberal Democrats	Freddie Frisk	287	12.0
Turnout		2,615	40.2
Labour hold			
Labour hold			
Labour hold			

Top-candidate result	%	+/-
Labour	47.4	+1.4
Green	24.3	+6.8
Liberal Democrat	14.1	-4.6
Conservative	14.1	+3.0

=== East Chesterton ===
East Chesterton
Party	Candidate	Votes	%
Labour	Gerri Bird	1,463	53.5
Labour	Carla McQueen	1,023	37.4
Liberal Democrats	Michael Bond	983	36.0
Labour	Baiju Thittala	873	31.7
Liberal Democrats	Bob Illingworth	773	28.3
Liberal Democrats	John Leighton	696	25.5
Green	Elizabeth May	623	22.8
Green	Gareth Bailey	457	16.7
Green	Peter Pope	430	15.7
Conservative	Anette Iraninejad	312	11.4
Conservative	Frank Ribeiro	272	10.0
Conservative	Abubakar Said	239	8.7
UKIP	Peter Burkinshaw	55	2.0
Turnout		2,992	45.4
Labour hold			
Labour hold			
Liberal Democrats gain from Labour			

Top-candidate result	%	+/-
Labour	42.6	-1.5
Liberal Democrat	28.6	-4.6
Green	18.1	+7.2
Conservative	9.1	+2.5

=== King's Hedges ===
King's Hedges
Party	Candidate	Votes	%
Labour	Jenny Wood	1,013	50.2
Labour	Alex Collis	966	47.9
Labour	Martin Smart	750	37.2
Liberal Democrats	Andy McKay	427	21.2
Conservative	John Ionides	401	19.9
Green	Julia Tozer	369	18.3
Green	Mark Slade	367	18.2
Conservative	Jenny Ward	352	17.5
Liberal Democrats	Laurence Van Someren	347	17.2
Green	Adrian Matthews	340	16.9
Liberal Democrats	Joshan Parmar	335	16.6
Conservative	Rosemary Ward	329	16.3
Workers Party	Lionel Vida	56	2.8
Turnout		2,221	32.9
Labour hold			
Labour hold			
Labour hold			

Top-candidate result	%	+/-
Labour	45.8	+3.9
Liberal Democrat	19.3	-3.1
Conservative	18.1	+8.7
Green	16.7	-0.6

=== Market ===
Market
Party	Candidate	Votes	%
Liberal Democrats	Tim Bick	983	41.3
Labour	Alice Gilderdale	960	40.3
Liberal Democrats	Katie Porrer	868	36.4
Liberal Democrats	Anthony Martinelli	856	35.9
Labour	Graeme Hodgson	751	31.5
Labour	James Youd	688	28.9
Green	Nicola Eliott	628	26.4
Green	Emma Garnett	436	18.3
Green	Isabelle Thomas	342	14.4
Conservative	Tania Oram	221	9.3
Conservative	Phoebe Pickering	218	9.2
Conservative	James Appiah	194	8.1
Turnout		2,487	37.3
Liberal Democrats hold			
Labour gain from Liberal Democrats			
Liberal Democrats hold			

Top-candidate result	%	+/-
Liberal Democrat	35.2	-13.4
Labour	34.4	+7.7
Green	22.5	+4.1
Conservative	7.9	+1.6

=== Newnham ===
Newnham
Party	Candidate	Votes	%
Liberal Democrats	Lucy Nethsingha	939	40.3
Labour	Niamh Sweeney	910	39.1
Liberal Democrats	Markus Gehring	844	36.2
Labour	Cameron Holloway	817	35.1
Liberal Democrats	Josh Matthews	776	33.3
Labour	Hollie Wright	726	31.2
Green	Beverley Carpenter	609	26.1
Green	Shanna Hart	475	20.4
Green	Brett Hughes	365	15.7
Conservative	Wendy Fray	196	8.4
Conservative	James Vitali	181	7.8
Conservative	Mo Pantall	148	6.4
Turnout		2,439	37.6
Liberal Democrats hold			
Labour gain from Liberal Democrats			
Liberal Democrats hold			

Top-candidate result	%	+/-
Liberal Democrat	35.4	-14.7
Labour	34.3	+6.7
Green	22.9	+9.1
Conservative	7.4	-1.1

=== Petersfield ===
Petersfield
Party	Candidate	Votes	%
Labour	Mike Davey	1,590	50.0
Labour	Katie Thornburrow	1,532	48.2
Labour	Richard Robertson	1,362	42.8
Liberal Democrats	Emmanuel Carraud	915	28.8
Liberal Democrats	Judy Brunton	807	25.4
Green	Jenny Richens	755	23.7
Liberal Democrats	Cosmo Lupton	711	22.4
Green	Edwin Wilkinson	540	17.0
Green	Krzystof Strug	472	14.8
Conservative	Shapour Meftah	346	10.9
Conservative	David Thomas	281	8.8
Conservative	Robert Yeatman	226	7.1
Turnout		3,325	47.7
Labour hold			
Labour hold			
Labour hold			

Top-candidate result	%	+/-
Labour	44.1	-1.4
Liberal Democrat	25.4	-3.8
Green	20.9	+0.6
Conservative	9.6	+4.6

=== Queen Edith's ===
Queen Edith's
Party	Candidate	Votes	%
Independent	Sam Davies	1,874	62.4
Liberal Democrats	Jenny Page-Croft	1,074	35.7
Liberal Democrats	Daniel Lee	816	27.2
Liberal Democrats	Richard Eccles	709	23.6
Labour	Indy Vadhia	647	21.5
Labour	Dan Zahedi	647	21.5
Labour	Connor Morrissey	554	18.4
Independent	Al Dixon	536	17.8
Conservative	Christine Butler	512	17.0
Green	Jacqueline Whitmore	473	15.7
Green	Peter Price	377	12.5
Green	Simon Whitmore	318	10.6
Conservative	Shoaib Shahid	279	9.3
Conservative	Suhaib Shahid	199	6.6
Turnout		3,358	49.4
Independent gain from Liberal Democrats			
Liberal Democrats hold			
Liberal Democrats hold			

Top-candidate result	%	+/-
Independent	40.9	+12.0
Liberal Democrat	23.4	-13.4
Labour	14.1	-1.9
Conservative	11.2	+4.1
Green	10.3	-1.0

=== Romsey ===
Romsey
Party	Candidate	Votes	%
Labour	Dave Baigent	1,575	55.7
Labour	Mairead Healey	1,423	50.3
Labour	Dinah Pounds	1,378	48.7
Green	Sarah Nicmanis	643	22.7
Green	Suzie Webb	632	22.3
Green	Elisabeth Whitebread	615	21.7
Liberal Democrats	Laura Ryan	526	18.6
Liberal Democrats	Friso De Graaf	406	14.3
Liberal Democrats	John Walmsley	375	13.3
Conservative	Mohammed Azamuddin	337	11.9
Conservative	Daniel Collis	332	11.7
Conservative	Richard Haddon	248	8.8
Turnout		3,027	44.8
Labour hold			
Labour hold			
Labour hold			

Top-candidate result	%	+/-
Labour	51.1	+2.7
Green	20.9	-2.1
Liberal Democrat	17.1	-5.3
Conservative	10.9	+4.7

=== Trumpington ===
Trumpington
Party	Candidate	Votes	%
Liberal Democrats	Alan Cox	1,298	44.0
Liberal Democrats	Ingrid Flaubert	1,246	42.2
Liberal Democrats	Olaf Hauk	1,085	36.8
Labour	Amanda Hawkes	946	32.1
Labour	Nasir Uddin	729	24.7
Labour	Arran Parry-Davis	720	24.4
Green	Ceri Galloway	604	20.5
Conservative	Laurence Fischer	574	19.5
Conservative	Steven George	548	18.6
Conservative	Mike Spencer	421	14.3
Green	Sue Wells	359	12.2
Green	Hero Tardrew	319	10.8
Turnout		3,246	43.4
Liberal Democrats hold			
Liberal Democrats gain from Labour			
Liberal Democrats hold			

Top-candidate result	%	+/-
Liberal Democrat	37.9	-5.0
Labour	27.6	-0.2
Green	17.7	+0.6
Conservative	16.8	+4.5

=== West Chesterton ===
West Chesterton
Party	Candidate	Votes	%
Labour	Mike Sargeant	1,668	49.8
Labour	Jocelynne Scutt	1,514	45.2
Liberal Democrats	Jamie Dalzell	1,305	38.9
Labour	Richard Swift	1,236	36.9
Liberal Democrats	Shahida Rahman	1,057	31.5
Liberal Democrats	David Grace	1,040	31.0
Green	Roger Giddings	634	18.9
Green	Har Kaur	566	16.9
Green	Shayne Mitchell	469	14.0
Conservative	Michael Harford	333	9.9
Conservative	Sam Hunt	233	7.0
Turnout		3,575	54.0
Labour hold			
Labour gain from Liberal Democrats			
Liberal Democrats hold			

Top-candidate result	%	+/-
Labour	42.3	+9.6
Liberal Democrat	33.1	-17.4
Green	16.1	+5.2
Conservative	8.5	+2.5
