= 2022 Cambridge City Council election =

← 2021	5 May 2022	2023 →

16 out of 42 council seats up for election 22 seats needed for a majority

	First party	Second party	Third party
Party	Labour	Liberal Democrats	Green
Last election	27	12	2
Seats after	29	9	3
Seat change	▲2	▼3	▲1
- Map showing the strongest candidate by ward

The 2022 Cambridge City Council election took place on 5 May 2022 to elect members of Cambridge City Council. This was on the same day as other local elections were held across the United Kingdom.

== Results summary ==
2022 Cambridge City Council election
Party	This election			Full council			This election		
Party	Seats	Net	Seats %	Other	Total	Total %	Votes	Votes %	+/−
Labour	12	▲2	75.0	17	29	69.0	17,779	44.5	+3.8
Liberal Democrats	3	▼3	18.8	6	9	21.4	10,801	27.1	+1.3
Green	1	▲1	6.3	2	3	7.1	7,027	17.6	–2.1
Independent	0	Steady	0.0	1	1	2.4	361	0.9	–1.3
Conservative	0	Steady	0.0	0	0	0.0	3,940	9.9	–1.7

== Ward results ==
("Majority" figure below is the amount of lead over nearest contender. It does not show that the successful candidate received a majority of votes cast.)

=== Abbey ===
Abbey
Party	Candidate	Votes	%	±%
Green	Matt Howard	1,254	48.0	+6.5
Labour	Amanda Hawkes	974	37.3	–1.1
Conservative	David Smith	201	7.7	–2.8
Liberal Democrats	Rosemary Ansell	184	7.0	–2.5
Majority		280	10.7	
Turnout		2,613		
Green gain from Labour		Swing	▲3.8	

=== Arbury ===
Arbury (2 seats due to by-election)
Party	Candidate	Votes	%	±%
Labour	Iva Divkovic	1,176	53.4	+6.1
Labour	Patrick Sheil	1,145	52.0	+9.0
Liberal Democrats	Fionna Tod	444	20.2	+1.4
Liberal Democrats	Tim Ward	423	19.2	−4.3
Green	Stephen Lawrence	366	16.6	+2.0
Conservative	Robert Boorman	317	14.4	−0.1
Green	Peter Pope	292	13.3	−6.7
Conservative	Timothy Haire	242	11.0	−2.8
Turnout				
Labour hold		Swing		
Labour hold		Swing		

=== Castle ===
Castle
Party	Candidate	Votes	%	±%
Labour	Simon Smith	886	41.8	+4.5
Liberal Democrats	Caroline Stoddart	751	35.5	+1.5
Green	James Murray-White	370	17.5	–1.7
Conservative	James Appiah	111	5.2	–4.4
Majority		135	6.3	
Turnout		2,118		
Labour hold		Swing	▲1.5	

=== Cherry Hinton ===
Cherry Hinton
Party	Candidate	Votes	%	±%
Labour	Russ McPherson	1,345	58.3	+7.0
Conservative	Eric Barrett-Payton	391	16.9	–3.6
Green	Richard Potter	290	12.6	–0.9
Liberal Democrats	Peter McLaughlin	283	12.3	–2.4
Majority		954	41.4	
Turnout		2,309		
Labour hold		Swing	▲5.3	

=== Coleridge ===
Coleridge
Party	Candidate	Votes	%	±%
Labour	Anna Smith	1,363	56.3	+8.9
Green	Sarah Nicmanis	415	17.2	–7.1
Conservative	Robin Nelson	338	14.0	–0.1
Liberal Democrats	Sam Oliver	236	9.8	–4.3
Independent	Monica Hone	67	2.8	N/A
Majority		948	39.1	
Turnout		2,419		
Labour hold		Swing	▲8.0	

=== East Chesterton ===
East Chesterton
Party	Candidate	Votes	%	±%
Labour	Baiju Varkey	974	38.2	–4.4
Liberal Democrats	Bob Illingworth	947	37.1	+8.5
Green	Elizabeth May	388	15.2	–2.9
Conservative	Frank Ribeiro	243	9.5	+0.4
Majority		27	+1.1	
Turnout		2,552		
Labour gain from Liberal Democrats		Swing	▼6.5	

=== King's Hedges ===
King's Hedges
Party	Candidate	Votes	%	±%
Labour	Martin Smart	968	50.6	+4.8
Liberal Democrats	Rory Clark	383	20.0	+0.7
Green	Dan Kittmer	314	16.4	–0.3
Conservative	Mohammed Uddin	248	13.0	–5.1
Majority		585	30.6	
Turnout		1,913		
Labour hold		Swing	▲2.1	

=== Market ===
Market
Party	Candidate	Votes	%	±%
Liberal Democrats	Katie Porrer	904	43.4	+8.2
Labour	Hollie Wright	680	32.6	–1.8
Green	Nicola Elliott	364	17.5	–5.0
Conservative	Sam Hunt	137	6.6	–1.3
Majority		224	10.8	
Turnout		2,085		
Liberal Democrats hold		Swing	▲5.0	

=== Newnham ===
Newnham
Party	Candidate	Votes	%	±%
Labour	Cameron Holloway	813	36.4	+2.1
Liberal Democrats	Al Gadney	738	33.0	–2.4
Green	Jean Glasberg	558	25.0	+2.1
Conservative	Mo Pantall	125	5.6	–1.8
Majority		75	3.4	
Turnout		2,234		
Labour gain from Liberal Democrats		Swing	▲2.8	

=== Petersfield ===
Petersfield
Party	Candidate	Votes	%	±%
Labour	Richard Robertson	1,554	55.6	+11.5
Liberal Democrats	Emmanuel Carraud	598	21.4	–4.0
Green	Edwin Wilkinson	456	16.3	–4.6
Conservative	Mohamed Hossain	188	6.7	–2.9
Majority		956	34.2	
Turnout		2,769		
Labour hold		Swing	▲7.8	

=== Queen Edith’s ===
Queen Edith’s
Party	Candidate	Votes	%	±%
Liberal Democrats	Daniel Lee	1,202	42.0	+18.6
Labour	Steve King	881	30.8	+16.7
Green	Jacqueline Whitmore	396	13.8	+3.5
Conservative	Geoffrey Owen	382	13.4	+2.2
Majority		321	11.2	
Turnout		2,861		
Liberal Democrats hold		Swing	▲1.0	

=== Romsey ===
Romsey
Party	Candidate	Votes	%	±%
Labour	Dinah Pounds	1,548	58.1	+7.0
Green	Suzie Webb	486	18.2	–2.7
Liberal Democrats	John Walmsley	416	15.6	–1.5
Conservative	Paul Roper	215	8.1	–2.8
Majority		1,062	39.9	
Turnout		2,665		
Labour hold		Swing	▲4.9	

=== Trumpington ===
Trumpington
Party	Candidate	Votes	%	±%
Liberal Democrats	Olaf Hauk	1,151	42.1	+4.2
Labour	Carlos Toranzos	853	31.2	+3.6
Conservative	Shapour Meftah	379	13.9	–2.9
Green	Ceri Galloway	352	12.9	–4.8
Majority		298	10.9	
Turnout		2,735		
Liberal Democrats hold		Swing	▲0.3	

=== West Chesterton ===
West Chesterton (2 seats due to by-election)
Party	Candidate	Votes	%	±%
Labour	Richard Swift	1,390	44.8	−0.4
Labour	Sam Carling	1,229	39.6	+2.7
Liberal Democrats	Jamie Dalzell	1,171	37.7	−1.2
Liberal Democrats	Shahida Rahman	970	31.3	−0.2
Green	Shayne Mitchell	389	12.5	−1.5
Green	Emma Garnett	337	10.9	−8.0
Independent	Jason Scott-Warren	294	9.5	N/A
Conservative	Jean-Ann Bartlett	232	7.5	−2.4
Conservative	Michael Harford	191	6.2	−0.8
Turnout				
Labour gain from Liberal Democrats		Swing		
Labour hold		Swing		

== By-elections ==
=== Trumpington ===
Trumpington: 18 August 2022
Party	Candidate	Votes	%	±%
Liberal Democrats	David Levien	1,017	49.8	+7.7
Labour	Rahima Ahammed	472	23.1	−8.1
Green	Ceri Galloway	298	14.6	+1.7
Conservative	Shapour Meftah	256	12.5	−1.4
Majority		545	26.7	
Turnout		2,049	27.3	
Liberal Democrats hold				
