= Cambridge Congestion Charge =

Cancelled congestion pricing scheme in Cambridge, England

Congestion Charge UK road traffic sign symbol

The Cambridge Congestion Charge, or Sustainable Travel Zone was a scrapped congestion pricing scheme proposed by the Greater Cambridge Partnership (GCP) in England, which was scheduled for completion in 2027/28. The GCP believed the scheme would help fund transport provision and reduce congestion in the city of Cambridge. The scheme proposed a £5 minimum daily charge on vehicles entering the city, increased to £10 for vans and to £50 for heavy goods vehicles and coaches. Exceptions were proposed for "emergency vehicles, disabled tax class vehicles and breakdown services", among others. The scheme became the subject of local controversy, with 58% of respondents recording their opposition in an official consultation, and was scrapped in September 2023.

== Background ==
Cambridge is a small university city in England, United Kingdom with a population of 145,700 as of the 2021 United Kingdom census. The city is served by two National Rail stations – Cambridge and Cambridge North, with bus links principally provided by Stagecoach including guided busway and park and ride services. In October 2022, Stagecoach cancelled 18 Cambridgeshire bus routes due to "significant falls in passenger numbers" resulting in local backlash. In the 2021 census, just 41% of residents reported to use "private motorised vehicles" as their main means by which they commute to work compared to 49% by cycle or foot, with Cambridge having the highest level of city cycle usage in the UK.

== Proposal ==
Proposals for the Sustainable Travel Zone were first published by the Greater Cambridge Partnership in August 2022, putting forward a planned £5 minimum charge for entering the city of Cambridge by motor vehicle operating weekdays from 7am-7pm. The proposed charge levels were set out at:

Proposed charge levels
Category	Proposed charge (per day)	Notes
Cars, mopeds, motorbikes	£5	The GCP has noted the "potential to explore a 50% discount for zero emissions vehicles"
Vans, vehicles with more than 9 seats	£10	Excludes coaches and buses
Coaches, HGVs	£50	
Registered buses, taxis, private hire vehicles	Free	

Exceptions were proposed for:

- Emergency vehicles
- Military vehicles
- Disabled tax class vehicles
- Breakdown services
- Dial-a-ride services
- "Certain local authority operational vehicles, e.g. refuse collection vehicles"
- Blue badge holders (up to two vehicles)
- People on low-incomes ("tapered discount 25–100%")
- Car club vehicles

In June 2023, a selection of alternative proposals were put forward for consideration by the GCP board, with further collaboration with Cambridgeshire County Council, after the GCP announced that the proposals should be modified. These included:

- Cars only being charged £5 between 07:00 and 19:00 on weekdays or charging only at peak travel times (in comparison to the previous proposal that placed no exceptions on the times at which the charge would be in force)
- Providing 330 free-days for drivers tiered within the first 4 years of operation
- Exemptions for hospital trips
- Rejecting any Congestion Charging proposal all-together

== Response ==
In response to an official consultation, 58% of respondents recorded their opposition to the scheme, which the Greater Cambridge Partnership believed would raise necessary funds for sustainable transport provision and reduce congestion on the city's roads. Opponents raised issues related to burdens placed on low income earners, the impact on local businesses and the lack of transport alternatives. The proposals were challenged by the local Labour, Conservative, Liberal Democrat and Green parties, though only the local Conservative Party definitively rejected any potential congestion pricing scheme outright. The proposed congestion charge was a major issue in the 2023 Cambridge City Council election.

In July 2023, the Secretary of State for Transport Mark Harper criticised the proposed scheme, calling for the plans to go "back to the drawing board". He accused the Liberal Democrats and Labour of "choosing to pursue an ideological anti-car agenda", stating that they "must listen to local residents". The scheme was scrapped in September 2023 after Liberal Democrat councillors expressed concerns and the Labour Party group withdrew their support. In October 2023, some councillors discussed retaining a congestion charging scheme as an option for future consideration.

== See also ==
- Transport in Cambridge
- Road pricing in the United Kingdom
