= Sam Carling =

British politician (born 2002)

Sam Carling MP
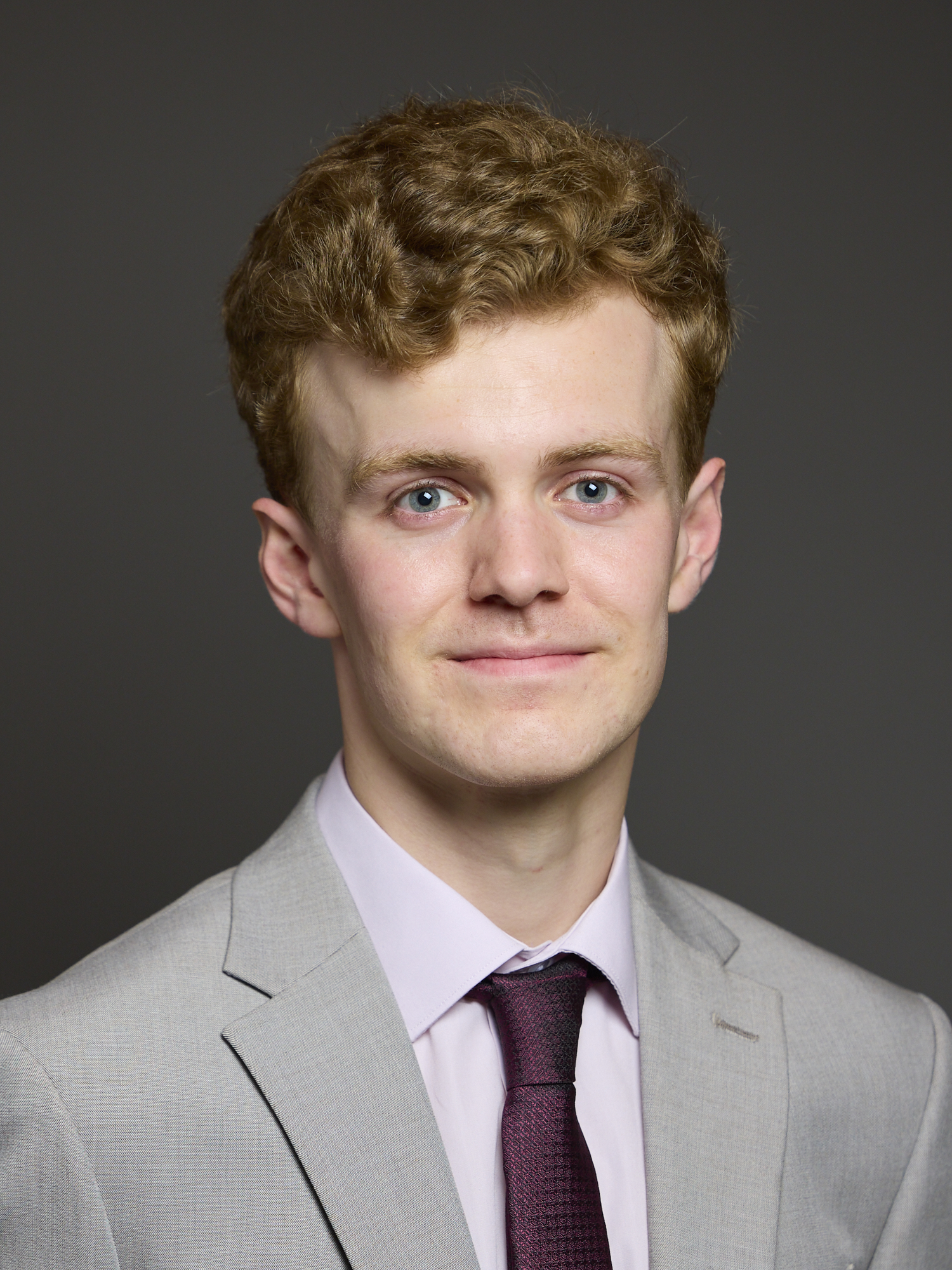
- Official portrait, 2024

Member of Parliament for North West Cambridgeshire
- Incumbent
- Assumed office 4 July 2024
- Preceded by: Shailesh Vara
- Majority: 39 (0.1%)

Member of Cambridge City Council for West Chesterton
- In office 9 May 2022 – 1 May 2025

Personal details
- Born: Samuel Carling; 2002 (age 23–24) County Durham, England
- Party: Labour
- Education: Christ's College, Cambridge (BA)
- Website: samcarling.org

Samuel Carling (born 2002) is a British Labour politician who has served as Member of Parliament (MP) for North West Cambridgeshire since 2024. He is the first British parliamentarian to be born in the 21st century. By convention, as the youngest member of Parliament, he is accorded the honorary style of Baby of the House. Carling represented the ward of West Chesterton on Cambridge City Council from 2022 until 2025.

== Early life and education ==
Samuel Carling was born in 2002 and raised in Crook, County Durham. He described his background as being from "a totally apolitical family, in quite a deprived part of the north east of England". Carling was raised as a Jehovah's Witness; a faith who are famous for non-participation in politics and not associating with anyone outside their religion.

Originally from Bishop Auckland, Carling completed his GCSEs at Wolsingham School before attending sixth form at Barnard Castle School, an independent boarding school in County Durham, with an academic scholarship. He achieved five A* A-level grades and an Extended Project Qualification. The cancellation of some A-level exams during the COVID-19 pandemic sparked Carling's interest in politics, which developed at university and inspired him to run for elected office.

While at Barnard Castle School, Carling received the Salters–Nuffield Prize for "exceptional performance in biology" from the Worshipful Company of Salters with an essay entitled "Could carbon quantum dots have applications in bioimaging?"

Aged 18, Carling then went to read natural sciences at Christ's College, Cambridge, where he became actively involved in Cambridge University politics. A staff writer for Varsity, Carling served as president of Christ's College JCR and co-chairman of the Cambridge University Labour Club, before being elected debates officer of the Cambridge Union. In March 2022, he was elected as a member of the Cambridge University Council. (Note: Carling won the contested post of University Councillor following the Cambridge University election of 3 March 2022. With an 800-vote majority in the first round, Carling then was elected with 896 student votes after eliminating two other candidates.) In 2023, he graduated with first-class honours and became an undergraduate tutor.

While studying for a Master of Philosophy (MPhil) postgraduate degree in pathology at Cambridge, Carling was elected to Parliament in 2024, the academic year having only just ended.

== Political career ==
In 2022, while still a second-year undergraduate, Carling ran on the Labour slate for election to Cambridge City Council to represent the ward of West Chesterton. At the local elections held on 5 May 2022, Carling narrowly defeated incumbent Liberal Democrat councillor Jamie Dalzell, increasing Labour's majority on Cambridge City Council with the Liberal Democrats losing three seats and the Greens gaining one. Carling became the first Cambridge student in memory to successfully contest a City Council seat. He was re-elected at the 2024 Cambridge City Council election. During his tenure, Carling held the office of Executive Councillor for Open Spaces and City Services, and was a member of the Skills Committee of the Cambridgeshire and Peterborough Combined Authority for two years. He was an advocate of improvements to adult education and transport throughout Cambridgeshire and Peterborough.

Carling announced his intention to step down as a Cambridge city councillor as soon as a by-election could reasonably be held and, in the following week on 18 July, he resigned from the council's cabinet. Carling has ceased to take councillor allowances since then.

=== House of Commons ===
At the 2024 general election, Carling successfully contested the constituency of North West Cambridgeshire for the Labour Party. Campaigning for better public services, he defeated incumbent Conservative MP Shailesh Vara being returned to Parliament by a narrow margin of 39 votes, verified by a recount. The seat had been held by the Conservatives since its creation in 1997. At the age of 22, he was the youngest MP elected at the 2024 election and became Baby of the House. Carling is the first British MP to be born in the 21st century. He is the Labour Party's joint-youngest MP, tied with Malcolm Macmillan, who was elected at the same age in 1935. On 24 July 2024, Carling made his maiden speech in a debate on education and opportunity.

On 11 May 2026, he called on Keir Starmer to resign after the poor results in the 2026 United Kingdom local elections.

== Personal life ==
In an interview with The Times, Carling described himself as a member of the LGBT community.

== Notes ==
Parliament of the United Kingdom
Preceded by Shailesh Vara	Member of Parliament for North West Cambridgeshire; 2024–present	Incumbent
Honorary titles
Preceded by Keir Mather	Baby of the House; 2024–present	Incumbent
