= Ipswich Steam Navigation Company =

The Ipswich Steam Navigation Company (ISN) was founded in 1824, and provided a steamship service to London and Harwich, with occasional voyages to the Netherlands. The company went into liquidation in 1953.

In 1852, the ISN partnered with the Eastern Union Railway following the introduction of excessive fares by the Eastern Counties Railway for passengers from East Anglia who wished to complete the journey to London on their railway line from Colchester. The service went from Ipswich to Blackwall and took up to ten hours. However, the provision of toilets and refreshments made this option more attractive at a time when these were not generally available on train services.
