= 2023 Cambridge City Council election =

- 4 May 2023

16 out of 42 seats to Cambridge City Council 22 seats needed for a majority
	First party	Second party
Leader	Anna Smith	Tim Bick
Party	Labour	Liberal Democrats
Last election	29 seats, 44.5%	9 seats, 27.1%
Seats before	29	9
Seats won	10	4
Seats after	27	10
Seat change	▼2	▲1
Popular vote	14,980	8,691
Percentage	38.2%	22.1%
Swing	▼6.3%	▼5.0%
	Third party	Fourth party
Leader	Naomi Bennett
Party	Green	Independent
Last election	3 seats, 17.6%	1 seat, 2.4%
Seats before	3	1
Seats won	2	0
Seats after	4	1
Seat change	▲1	Steady
Popular vote	7,033	893
Percentage	17.9%	2.3%
Swing	▲0.3%	▲1.4%
- Winner of each seat at the 2023 Cambridge City Council election.
Leader before election
Anna Smith
Labour
Leader after election
Mike Davey
Labour

The 2023 Cambridge City Council election took place on 4 May 2023 to elect members of Cambridge City Council in Cambridge, Cambridgeshire, England. This was on the same day as other local elections across England. A major issue was a proposed congestion charge.

Labour retained its majority on the council, but replaced its leader after the election, with Mike Davey being appointed the new leader of the council at the subsequent annual council meeting on 25 May 2023.

== Overall results ==
The overall results were as follows:

2023 Cambridge City Council election
Party	This election				Full council			This election		
Party	Candidates	Seats	Net	Seats %	Other	Total	Total %	Votes	Votes %	+/−
Labour	{{{candidates}}}	10	▼2	62.5	17	27	64.3	14,980	38.2	–6.3
Liberal Democrats	{{{candidates}}}	4	▲1	25.0	6	10	23.8	8,691	22.1	–5.0
Green	{{{candidates}}}	2	▲1	12.5	2	4	9.5	7,033	17.9	+0.3
Independent	{{{candidates}}}	0	Steady	0.0	1	1	2.4	893	2.3	+1.4
Conservative	{{{candidates}}}	0	Steady	0.0	0	0	0.0	7,552	19.2	+9.3
Heritage	{{{candidates}}}	0	Steady	0.0	0	0	0.0	59	0.2	N/A
UKIP	{{{candidates}}}	0	Steady	0.0	0	0	0.0	33	0.1	N/A

== Ward results ==
The ward results were as follows. Sitting councillors standing for re-election are marked with an asterisk (*):

=== Abbey ===
Abbey
Party	Candidate	Votes	%	±%
Green	Elliot Tong	1,077	42.7	−5.3
Labour	Zarina Anwar	804	31.9	−6.2
Conservative	David Philip Smith	463	18.4	+10.7
Liberal Democrats	Rosemary Ansell	174	6.9	−0.1
Majority		273	10.8	+0.1
Turnout		2,518		
Green hold		Swing	▲0.5	

=== Arbury ===
Arbury
Party	Candidate	Votes	%	±%
Labour	Mike Todd-Jones*	1,175	48.1	−4.6
Conservative	Robert William Boorman	671	27.5	+13.1
Green	Stephen Roger Lawrence	333	13.6	−3.0
Liberal Democrats	Sam Oliver	264	10.8	−8.7
Majority		504	20.6	N/A
Turnout		2,443		
Labour hold		Swing	▼8.9	

=== Castle ===
Castle (2 seats due to by-election)
Party	Candidate	Votes	%	±%
Liberal Democrats	Cheney-Anne Payne*	816	39.6	+4.1
Labour	Antoinette Nestor	716	34.7	–7.1
Labour	Mary Murphy	651	31.6	–10.2
Independent	David Summerfield	632	30.7	N/A
Liberal Democrats	Will Tilbrook	437	21.2	–14.3
Green	Esme Hennessy	338	16.4	–1.1
Green	Dan Kittmer	225	10.9	–6.6
Conservative	Rhona Corinne Boorman	162	7.9	+2.7
Conservative	Tomasz Dyl	145	7.0	+1.8
Turnout				
Liberal Democrats hold				
Labour hold				

The by-election in Castle ward was triggered by the resignation of Labour councillor Sarah Baigent in March 2023.

=== Cherry Hinton ===
Cherry Hinton
Party	Candidate	Votes	%	±%
Labour	Robert Paul Dryden*	1,119	43.0	–15.3
Conservative	Zachary Marsh	1,056	40.6	+23.7
Green	Richard Michael Potter	235	9.0	–3.6
Liberal Democrats	Archie McCann	193	7.4	–4.9
Majority		63	2.4	–39.0
Turnout		2,603		
Labour hold		Swing	▼19.5	

=== Coleridge ===
Coleridge (2 seats due to by-election)
Party	Candidate	Votes	%	±%
Labour	Rosy Moore*	1,085	45.9	–10.4
Labour	Tim Griffin	895	37.9	–18.4
Green	Sarah Louise Nicmanis	661	28.0	+10.8
Conservative	Eric William Barrett-Payton	627	26.5	+12.5
Conservative	Robin Nelson	611	25.8	+11.8
Green	Peter Price	397	16.8	–0.4
Liberal Democrats	Judy Margaret Brunton	259	11.0	+1.2
Liberal Democrats	Tim Brunton	194	8.2	–1.6
Turnout				
Labour hold				
Labour hold				

The by-election in Coleridge ward was triggered by the resignation of Labour councillor Lewis Herbert in March 2023.

=== East Chesterton ===
East Chesterton
Party	Candidate	Votes	%	±%
Labour	Alice Flora Gilderdale*	1,014	38.4	+0.2
Liberal Democrats	Bob Illingworth	887	33.6	–3.5
Conservative	Frank Ribeiro	341	12.9	+3.4
Green	Elizabeth Alice May	305	11.6	–3.6
Heritage	Colin Miller	59	2.2	N/A
UKIP	Peter Burkinshaw	33	1.3	N/A
Majority		127	4.8	+3.7
Turnout		2,639		
Labour hold		Swing	▲1.9	

This seat had been vacant since December 2022 following the resignation of the previous Labour councillor, Carla McQueen. Alice Gilderdale had previously been councillor for Market ward.

=== King's Hedges ===
King's Hedges
Party	Candidate	Votes	%	±%
Labour	Alex Collis*	798	39.2	–11.4
Conservative	Mohamed Delowar Hossain	650	31.9	+18.9
Liberal Democrats	Fionna Tod	305	15.0	–5.0
Green	Adrian Mark Matthews	285	14.0	–2.4
Majority		148	7.3	–23.3
Turnout		2,038		
Labour hold		Swing	▼15.2	

=== Market ===
Market
Party	Candidate	Votes	%	±%
Liberal Democrats	Anthony William Martinelli	796	41.2	–2.2
Labour	Rosy Greenlees	671	34.7	+2.1
Green	Krzysztof Strug	283	14.6	–2.9
Conservative	James Appiah	184	9.5	+2.9
Majority		125	6.5	–4.3
Turnout		1,934		
Liberal Democrats gain from Labour		Swing	▼2.2	

=== Newnham ===
Newnham
Party	Candidate	Votes	%	±%
Green	Jean Margaret Glasberg	895	40.5	+15.5
Labour	Anne Miller	756	34.2	–2.2
Liberal Democrats	Chang Liu	398	18.0	–15.0
Conservative	Susan Williams	161	7.3	+1.7
Majority		139	6.3	N/A
Turnout		2,210		
Green gain from Labour		Swing	▲8.9	

This seat had been vacant since March 2023 following the resignation of Labour councillor Niamh Sweeney.

=== Petersfield ===
Petersfield
Party	Candidate	Votes	%	±%
Labour	Katie Thornburrow*	1,302	49.5	–6.1
Liberal Democrats	Emmanuel Carraud	509	19.4	–2.0
Green	Joshua Morris-Blake	449	17.1	+0.8
Conservative	Paul Roper	370	14.1	+7.4
Majority		793	30.1	–4.1
Turnout		2,630		
Labour hold		Swing	▼2.1	

=== Queen Edith's ===
Queen Edith's
Party	Candidate	Votes	%	±%
Liberal Democrats	Karen Young	1,131	37.9	–4.1
Labour	Thomas Ron	709	23.7	–7.1
Conservative	Gordon Gregory	580	19.4	+6.0
Green	Jacqueline Whitmore	306	10.2	–3.6
Independent	Antony Carpen	261	8.7	N/A
Majority		422	14.2	+3.0
Turnout		2,987		
Liberal Democrats hold		Swing	▲1.5	

=== Romsey ===
Romsey
Party	Candidate	Votes	%	±%
Labour	Mairéad Healy*	1,219	45.5	–12.6
Green	Suzie Webb	555	20.7	+2.5
Conservative	Mohammed Azamuddin	514	19.2	+11.1
Liberal Democrats	John Walmsley	389	14.5	–1.1
Majority		664	24.8	–15.1
Turnout		2,677		
Labour hold		Swing	▼7.6	

=== Trumpington ===
Trumpington
Party	Candidate	Votes	%	±%
Liberal Democrats	Ingrid Flaubert*	931	35.6	–6.5
Labour	Carlos Toranzos	752	28.8	–2.4
Conservative	Shapour Meftah	605	23.1	+9.2
Green	Chloe Mosonyi	327	12.5	–0.4
Majority		179	6.8	–4.1
Turnout		2,615		
Liberal Democrats hold		Swing	▼2.1	

In March 2026, Cllr Flaubert announced she had left the Lib Dems to sit as a Green.

=== West Chesterton ===
West Chesterton
Party	Candidate	Votes	%	±%
Labour	Rachel Wade	1,314	42.4	+2.4
Liberal Democrats	Jamie Dalzell	1,008	32.6	–1.1
Conservative	Michael Harford	412	13.3	+6.6
Green	Shayne Mitchell	362	11.7	+0.5
Majority		306	9.8	
Turnout		3,096		
Labour hold		Swing	▲1.8	

== By-elections ==
=== King's Hedges ===
King's Hedges by-election, 4 July 2023
Party	Candidate	Votes	%	±%
Conservative	Delowar Hossain	622	34.9	+3.0
Labour	Zarina Anwar	598	33.6	–5.6
Liberal Democrats	Jamie Dalzell	418	23.5	+8.5
Green	Elizabeth May	142	8.0	–6.0
Majority		24	1.3	N/A
Turnout		1,780	26.7	
Conservative gain from Labour		Swing	▲4.3	

The King's Hedges by-election was triggered by the resignation of Labour councillor Alex Collis on 15 May 2023. It marked the first Conservative Cambridge City Council victory since 2012.

=== Queen Edith's ===
Queen Edith's: 23 November 2023
Party	Candidate	Votes	%	±%
Liberal Democrats	Immy Blackburn-Horgan	745	35.0	–2.9
Labour	Thomas Ron	678	31.8	+8.1
Conservative	David Carmona	454	21.3	+1.9
Green	Oliver Fisher	252	11.8	+1.6
Majority		67	3.2	–11.0
Turnout		2,129	32.3	
Registered electors		6,591		
Liberal Democrats gain from Independent		Swing	▼5.5	
