= 2019 Cambridge City Council election =

English local government election

- 2 May 2019

16: one-third of 42 plus 2 by-elections 22 seats needed for a majority
- Turnout: 36.6%

	First party	Second party
Party	Labour	Liberal Democrats
Seats before	26	14
Seats won	9	7
Seats after	26	15
Seat change	Steady	▲1
Popular vote	13,936	13,131
Percentage	37.2%	35.0%
Swing	▼9.2%	▲3.1%
	Third party	Fourth party
Party	Independent	Green
Seats before	1	1
Seats won	0	0
Seats after	1	0
Seat change	Steady	▼1
Popular vote	838	5,746
Percentage	2.2%	15.3%
Swing	▲2.2%	▲6.6%
- Winner of each seat at the 2019 Cambridge City Council election

The 2019 Cambridge City Council election took place on 2 May 2019 to elect members of Cambridge City Council in England. It took place on the same day as other nationwide local elections.

There were 90,575 registered electors, and turnout was 36.6%.

== Results summary ==
2019 Cambridge City Council election
Party	This election				Full council			This election		
Party	Candidates	Seats	Net	Seats %	Other	Total	Total %	Votes	Votes %	+/−
Labour	16	9	Steady	56.3	17	26	61.9	13,936	37.2	–9.2
Liberal Democrats	16	7	▲1	43.8	8	15	35.7	13,131	35.0	+3.1
Green	15	0	▼1	0.0	0	0	0.0	5,746	15.3	+6.6
Conservative	16	0	Steady	0.0	0	0	0.0	3,308	8.8	–3.9
Independent	1	0	Steady	0.0	1	1	2.4	838	2.2	New
UKIP	3	0	Steady	0.0	0	0	0.0	462	1.2	+0.9
Renew	1	0	Steady	0.0	0	0	0.0	69	0.2	New

== Results by ward ==
=== Abbey ===
Abbey
Party	Candidate	Votes	%	±%
Labour	Haf Davies	1,055	50.0	−7.0
Green	Naomi Bennett	477	22.6	+11.9
Liberal Democrats	Jake Butt	328	15.6	−5.1
Conservative	David Smith	179	8.5	−3.2
Renew	Boris Boyd	69	3.3	New
Majority		578	27.4	
Turnout		2,126	31.4	—
Rejected ballots		18	0.8	
Registered electors		6,772		
Labour hold		Swing		

=== Arbury ===
Arbury
Party	Candidate	Votes	%	±%
Labour	Carina O'Reilly	1,097	48.9	−2.9
Liberal Democrats	Tim Ward	554	24.7	+0.1
Green	Stephen Lawrence	351	15.7	+6.6
Conservative	Harry Clynch	240	10.7	−3.8
Majority		543	24.2	
Turnout		2,270	35.4	
Rejected ballots		28	1.2	
Registered electors		6,407		
Labour hold		Swing		

=== Castle ===
Castle
Party	Candidate	Votes	%	±%
Liberal Democrats	Greg Chadwick	1,186	49.9	+9.1
Labour	Isabel Lambourne	698	29.4	−10.4
Green	Matthew Green	332	14.0	+6.2
Conservative	Oliver Riley	160	6.7	−3.8
Majority		488	20.5	
Turnout		2,397	36.1	
Rejected ballots		21	0.9	
Registered electors		6,640		
Liberal Democrats hold		Swing		

=== Cherry Hinton ===
Cherry Hinton
Party	Candidate	Votes	%	±%
Labour Co-op	Mark Ashton	1,062	49.4	−7.4
Liberal Democrats	Henry Wright	464	21.6	+5.5
Green	Jenny Richens	352	16.4	+8.8
Conservative	Mohamed Hossain	270	12.6	−6.9
Majority		598	27.8	
Turnout		2,181	34.6	
Rejected ballots		33	1.5	
Registered electors		6,297		
Labour Co-op hold		Swing		

=== Coleridge ===
Coleridge
Party	Candidate	Votes	%	±%
Labour	Grace Hadley	1,041	46.0	−9.9
Liberal Democrats	Alex Harrison	422	18.7	+1.1
Green	Sarah Nicmanis	395	17.5	+7.7
Conservative	Donald Douglas	250	11.1	−5.6
UKIP	Bill Kaminski	153	6.8	New
Majority		619	27.4	
Turnout		2,271	35.8	
Rejected ballots		10	0.4	
Registered electors		6,342		
Labour hold		Swing		

=== East Chesterton ===
East Chesterton
Party	Candidate	Votes	%	±%
Labour	Gerri Bird	1,097	44.1	−6.4
Liberal Democrats	Owen Dunn	827	33.2	+2.4
Green	Gareth Bailey	271	10.9	−1.9
Conservative	Timur Coskun	165	6.6	−4.5
UKIP	Peter Burkinshaw	128	5.1	+1.6
Majority		270	10.9	
Turnout		2,496	38.5	
Rejected ballots		8	0.3	
Registered electors		6,482		
Labour hold		Swing		

=== King's Hedges ===
One of the two King's Hedges seats was filled by a by-election held alongside the ordinary election, following the death of the Mayor of Cambridge, Labour councillor Nigel Gawthrope.

King's Hedges (2 seats)
Party	Candidate	Votes	%	±%
Labour	Alexandra Collis	851	48.4	−3.3
Labour	Kevin Price	751	42.7	−9.0
Liberal Democrats	Luke Hallam	455	25.9	+3.7
Liberal Democrats	Ewan Redpath	380	21.6	−0.6
Green	Angela Ditchfield	352	20.0	+10.8
Conservative	Eric Barrett-Payton	190	10.8	−6.1
UKIP	David Corn	181	10.3	New
Conservative	Benedict Smith	164	9.3	−7.6
Majority		296	16.8	
Turnout		1,769	28.6	
Rejected ballots		9	0.5	
Registered electors		6,185		
Labour hold				
Labour hold				

=== Market ===
Market
Party	Candidate	Votes	%	±%
Liberal Democrats	Katie Porrer	870	48.6	+5.1
Labour	Steve King	478	26.7	−10.6
Green	Emma Garnett	329	18.4	+6.9
Conservative	William Phelps	112	6.3	−1.4
Majority		392	21.9	
Turnout		1,805	30.9	
Rejected ballots		16	0.9	
Registered electors		5,839		
Liberal Democrats gain from Green		Swing		

=== Newnham ===
Newnham
Party	Candidate	Votes	%	±%
Liberal Democrats	Markus Gehring	1,003	50.1	+0.4
Labour	Joe Beastall	552	27.6	−8.4
Green	Mark Slade	276	13.8	+6.6
Conservative	Dolly Theis	171	8.5	+1.3
Majority		451	22.5	
Turnout		2,014	35.8	
Rejected ballots		12	0.6	
Registered electors		5,626		
Liberal Democrats hold		Swing		

=== Petersfield ===
Petersfield
Party	Candidate	Votes	%	±%
Labour	Michael Davey	969	45.5	−12.8
Liberal Democrats	Sarah Brown	622	29.2	+9.2
Green	Virgil Ierubino	433	20.3	+7.4
Conservative	Stephen Burdett	106	5.0	−3.8
Majority		347	16.3	
Turnout		2,154	40.5	
Rejected ballots		24	1.1	
Registered electors		5,323		
Labour hold		Swing		

=== Queen Edith's ===
Queen Edith's
Party	Candidate	Votes	%	±%
Liberal Democrats	George Pippas	1,067	36.8	−7.4
Independent	Sam Davies	838	28.9	New
Labour	Dan Greef	464	16.0	−13.0
Green	Elisabeth Whitebread	329	11.3	+3.6
Conservative	Manas Deb	205	7.1	−12.0
Majority		229	7.9	
Turnout		2,918	44.1	
Rejected ballots		15	0.5	
Registered electors		6,616		
Liberal Democrats hold		Swing		

=== Romsey ===
Romsey
Party	Candidate	Votes	%	±%
Labour	Anna Smith	1,138	48.4	−10.9
Green	Caitlin Patterson	540	23.0	+12.1
Liberal Democrats	Joshua Blanchard Lewis	526	22.4	−0.5
Conservative	Martin Keegan	146	6.2	−0.7
Majority		598	25.4	
Turnout		2,373	36.8	
Rejected ballots		23	1.0	
Registered electors		6,451		
Labour hold		Swing		

=== Trumpington ===
One of the two Trumpington seats was filled by a by-election held alongside the ordinary election, following the resignation of independent councillor Donald Adey.

Trumpington (2 seats)
Party	Candidate	Votes	%	±%
Liberal Democrats	Peter Lord	1,509	43.7	+6.1
Liberal Democrats	Daniel Summerbell	1,474	42.6	+5.0
Labour	Matt Bird	977	28.3	−9.4
Labour	May Shafi	773	22.4	−15.3
Green	Ceri Galloway	600	17.4	+8.9
Conservative	Shapour Meftah	431	12.5	−3.7
Green	Sue Wells	399	11.5	+3.0
Conservative	Philip Salway	349	10.1	−6.1
Majority		497	14.4	
Turnout		3,497	36.4	
Rejected ballots		40	1.1	
Registered electors		9,604		
Liberal Democrats hold		Swing		
Liberal Democrats gain from Independent		Swing		

=== West Chesterton ===
West Chesterton
Party	Candidate	Votes	%	±%
Liberal Democrats	Damien Tunnacliffe	1,444	50.5	+6.3
Labour	Alex Skinner	933	32.7	−7.5
Green	Shayne Mitchell	310	10.9	+4.3
Conservative	Michael Harford	170	6.0	−3.0
Majority		511	17.9	
Turnout		2,873	48.0	
Rejected ballots		16	0.6	
Registered electors		5,991		
Liberal Democrats hold		Swing		

== Changes 2019–2021 ==
- In August 2020, Liberal Democrat councillor George Pippas (Queen Edith's) resigned because of ill health.
- In September 2020, Liberal Democrat councillors Rod Cantrill (Newnham) and Peter Lord (Trumpington) resigned.
- In October 2020, Labour councillor Kevin Price (King's Hedges) resigned in protest at a council motion on transgender rights.
- Because by-elections were suspended during the COVID-19 pandemic, the four seats were held vacant until the ordinary election on 6 May 2021.

=== By-elections ===
==== Newnham ====
The Newnham by-election was triggered by the resignation of Liberal Democrat councillor Lucy Nethsingha following her election as a Member of the European Parliament.

Newnham by-election, 8 August 2019
Party	Candidate	Votes	%	±%
Liberal Democrats	Josh Matthews	774	59.5	+16.3
Labour	Niamh Sweeney	235	18.1	–18.1
Green	Mark Slade	149	11.5	+1.5
Conservative	Michael Spencer	143	11.0	+0.2
Majority		539	41.4	
Turnout		1,305	26.7	
Rejected ballots		4	0.3	
Liberal Democrats hold		Swing		
