= Transport in Ipswich =

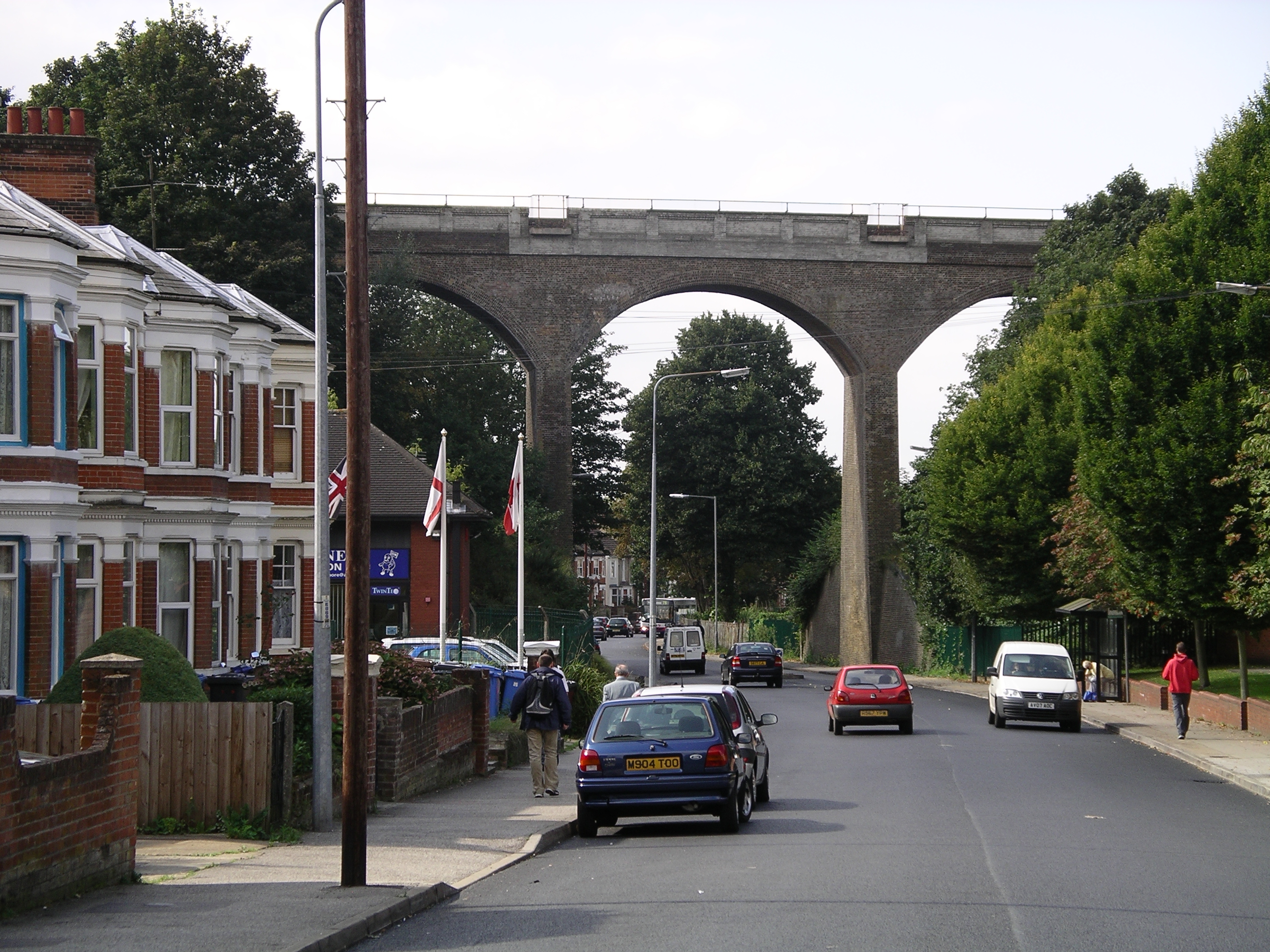
Railway viaduct over Spring Road, Ipswich

Ipswich is the county town of Suffolk, England. It is a medieval port and industrial town with a strong transport history; the urban area has a population of 122,000 and currently offers urban transport services for cars, cycles and buses. In addition there are 3 railway stations and regional coach services. London Stansted Airport is accessible by the airlink coach.

== Urban transport ==
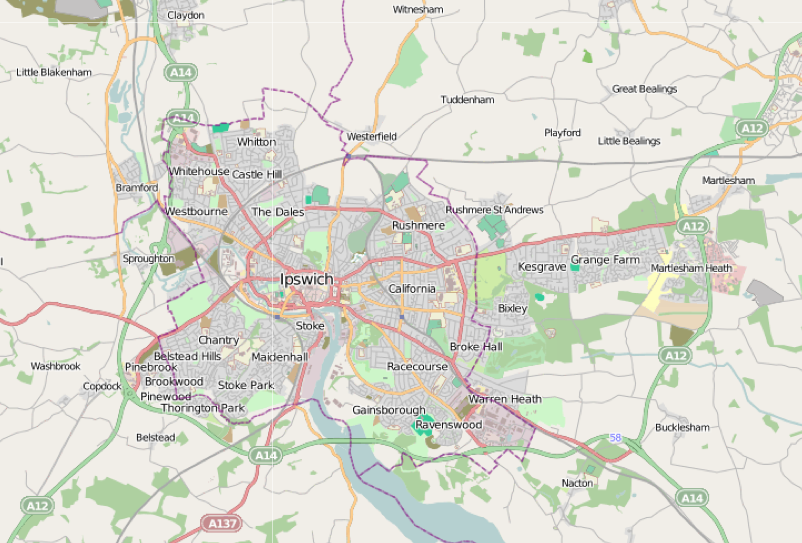
View area in OpenStreetMap

Urban transport within Ipswich is primarily based on the local road network based both on the historical street pattern and on newer roads. The town centre has been pedestrianised and there are a number of parks, footpaths and cycle routes. A small number of the paths have been identified as rights of way.

=== Car ===
There are approximately 5,800 public off-street public parking places available in the town centre. There are two park and ride sites in Ipswich; London Road (A14 Junction 55 / A12) and Martlesham (A12/A1214 road). Park and ride buses run every 10 minutes from 7am till 7pm Monday to Saturday. Some residential areas close to the town centre are covered by residents parking zones where general parking is not permitted.

A number of car rental companies operate within the town including Alamo Rent a Car, Avis, Enterprise Rent-A-Car, Europcar, Hertz, John Grose car rental and National Car Rental. A car club operates in the town with 2 cars available in Grange Farm

=== Rail ===
Derby Road railway station is a suburban railway station that offers local services, situated just east of Ipswich town centre.

=== Bus ===
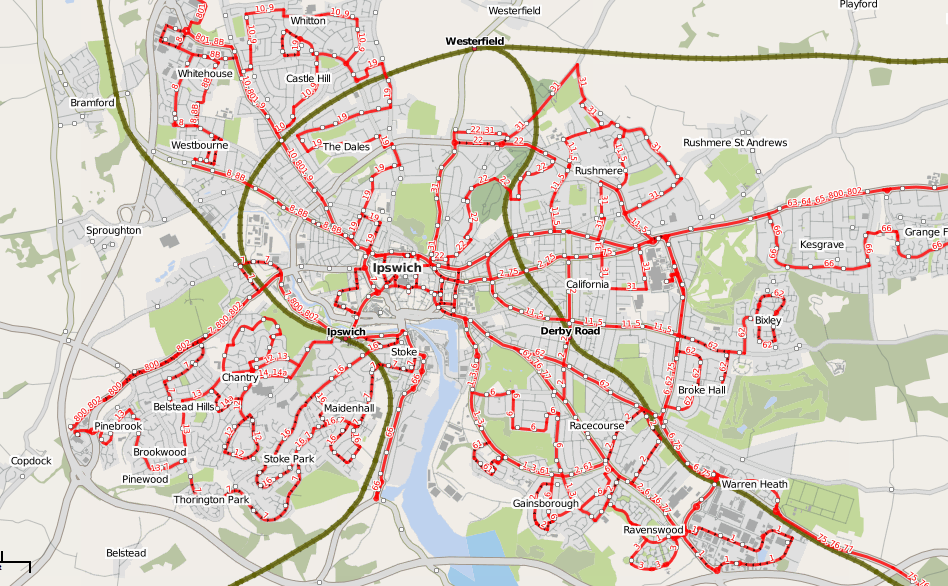
View source bus map

Services are provided by Ipswich Buses (who run most of the town services), and by First Eastern Counties, Carters Coach Services, Beestons and Galloway European who serve a wider area.

Town services mainly operate from Tower Ramparts bus station and regional services from the Ipswich Old Cattle Market bus station with services to locations such as Diss, Aldeburgh, Felixstowe, Colchester, Sudbury and Stowmarket.

Route number 66 is a partially guided busway, operated by First Eastern Counties, serves Martlesham Heath and Kesgrave from the town and the railway station.

=== Cycling ===
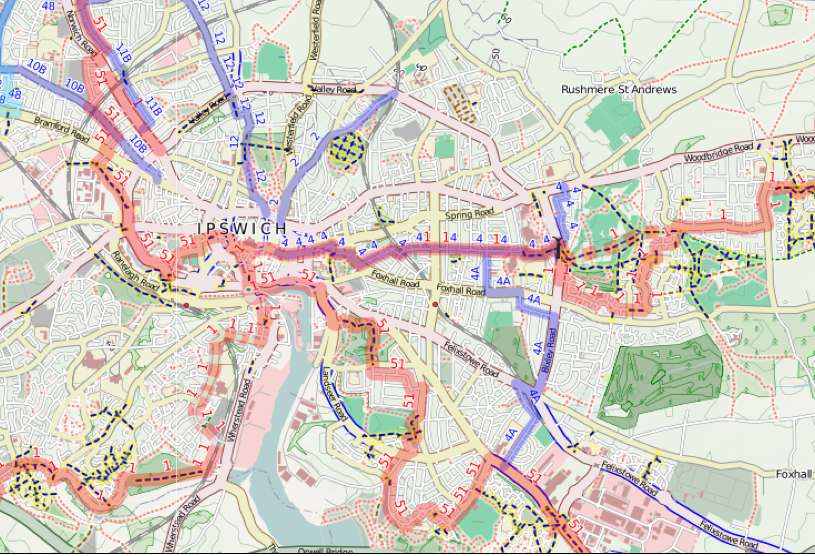
view cycle map in OpenStreetMap

Ipswich is a small town which is well suited to cycling and the council has been investing significant sums of money in recent years to improve the facilities. There is a network of (partially) signed cycle routes and many other suitable routes. Grange Farm has some excellent tracks and the local school, Kesgrave High School has one of the highest percentages of pupils cycling to school in the country. There is cycle storage available at all stations and there can be carried on all trains but space is sometimes limited (see Rail section below for details). BMX bikes can use the Ipswich BMX Track in Landseer Park and also the Ipswich Skate Park.

Regional Cycle Route 41 and Regional Cycle Route 42 serve the Suffolk Coast and Heaths Area of Outstanding Natural Beauty. National Cycle Route 1 (from Dover to Scotland) and National Cycle Route 51 (Colchester via Harwich and Felixstowe to Oxford) pass through Ipswich. Ipswich is also on the North Sea Cycle Route. Cycle Ipswich, CTC Suffolk and Sustrans are all active in the town to promote more cycling and better facilities.

=== Rights of way ===
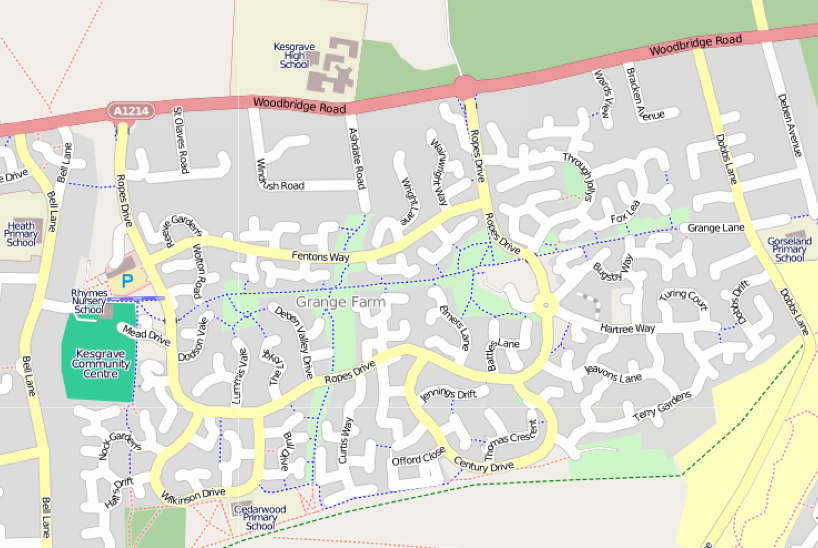
View source area in OpenStreetMap

Ipswich has a number of large parks including Christchurch Park, Holywells Park, Landseer Park, Gippswick Park and Bourne Park all with good footpaths; the cemetery also forms a useful pedestrian route and destination. Grange Farm in Kesgrave in the outskirts of Ipswich is built round a network spine of cycle and footpaths. The Maidenhall area of Ipswich is also built round a central spine of footpaths. Kesgrave High School is accessible from the network via a pedestrian subway under the main road.

In 2009 the county council published a Definitive Map showing 21 footpaths with associated public orders, the county recognises that this list is 'far from complete' and is working with other agencies to include further routes as information becomes available.

The requirement to produce a Definitive Map dates back to 1983 as outlined the Wildlife and Countryside Act 1981 however they note that no timescale was set down for when work should start or be completed; a first draft of which took 25 years in this case.

== Longer distance transport ==
=== Car ===
The A12 links Ipswich to London (84 miles (135 km)), Lowestoft, Great Yarmouth and the M25. The A14 links the town with Cambridge (57 miles (92 km)), the Midlands and Felixstowe. The A140 (single carriageway) links the town with Norwich.

=== Rail ===
Ipswich railway station is (0.7 miles (1.1 km)) from the town centre. The station serves trains to Cambridge, Felixstowe, London Liverpool Street, Lowestoft, Norwich and Peterborough; it also serves other stations located on the Great Eastern Main Line, East Suffolk Line, Ipswich to Ely Line and Felixstowe Branch Line. Derby Road station serves Felixstowe, Trimley and Ipswich; Westerfield station serves stations on the East Suffolk Line to Lowestoft.

All three stations have step-free access, following the installation of lifts at Ipswich station in 2011. There are cycle storage facilities available at all stations. It is also possible to take bicycles on trains on all services; trains to London have ample storage in the guards van which is located at the back of the train for services to London and at the front on the return. Other train services have limited cycle capacity, about 4 bicycles per train for Cambridge and the Felixstowe services on the East Suffolk Line. At certain times these can be fully used, there are particular overcrowding problems on the East Suffolk Line in good weather where cyclists are often refused access on safety grounds.

Train services are operated by Greater Anglia. The fastest service into London Liverpool Street currently has a journey time of one hour and 10 minutes.

=== Coach ===
A number of nearby towns and villages can be accessed by Bus. For longer journeys National Express operate the 481 service to London Victoria Coach Station, the 250 to Stansted Airport and Heathrow Airport and the 305 service to Cambridge, Northampton, Birmingham and eventually to Liverpool. These services depart from Cardinal Park in Ipswich, most also serve the railway station.

=== Air ===
Between 1930 and 1996 there was a small airport within Ipswich (see history section below). The nearest international flights are from Stansted Airport and Norwich Airport, both approximately 47 miles (76 km) away. National Express operate coaches to Stansted and Heathrow. Stansted Airport can alternatively be reached by changing trains at Cambridge. Heathrow Airport can be reached by London Underground from Liverpool Street.

=== Shipping ===
The Port of Ipswich, operated by Associated British Ports offers a mix of facilities for handling containers, timber, dry bulk cargo oil as well as a Ro-Ro terminal. It is one of the Haven ports along with the Port of Felixstowe and Harwich International.

== Planning ==
Suffolk County Council is the transport authority and as such is in charge of transport policy and have published a Suffolk Local Transport Plan for the period 2006–2011 which outlines the transport plans for the town and the rest of the county. They also publish an Ipswich Transport Strategy which provides more detailed information for the town. These documents are prepared in consultation with the borough council and with various other organisations and interest groups.

Ipswich Borough council is the planning authority and is required to publish a Local Development Framework (LDF) which outlines plans for the development of the town which necessarily includes some transport elements. A new LDF is currently in preparation. Ipswich Borough Council is also a 'delivery agent' for aspects of transport policy and often oversees the implementation of new transport schemes on the ground.

Ipswich is in the East of England and transport policy needs to be 'broadly compliant' with the transport section of the Regional Spatial Strategy which is produced by the East of England Regional Assembly. It outlines the overall issues and plans for the region. It is a legal requirement for county and borough plans to be 'broad compliance' with the regional strategy.

== History ==
=== Early history ===
A Roman road originally known as Pye Road and part of which is now the A140, linked Colchester with Caistor St. Edmund near Norwich. By the Middle Ages wool was being exported from Ipswich by ship and by the 13th century there was a thriving shipbuilding industry. The wool trade boomed in the 16th century before declining in the 17th century.

The first known map of the town is dated 1539 which was created when Henry VIII feared invasion from France and Spain. John Speed then published an atlas in 1611, 'The Theatre of the Empire of Great Britaine', which included a map of Ipswich and John Ogilby's 1675 'Britannia' Atlas map showed a three routes from Ipswich:-

- Colchester, Ipswich, Saxmundham, Beccles, Yarmouth
- Huntingdon, Ely, Bury St Edmunds, Ipswich
- Ipswich, Thwaite, Norwich, Cromer

The Highways Act 1555 (and subsequent Highways Act 1562) placed responsibility of road maintenance on the local parishes. The first turnpike trust in Suffolk was established in 1741 to improve the road from Ipswich to Scole via Claydon. An old milestone in Ipswich shows London as 69 miles (111 km) and Gt Yarmouth 54 miles (87 km) north. A daily coaching service to London operated at this time, but was expensive at 3d per mile according to Daniel Defoe and the journey took 10 hours in 1762. A map from 1766 shows the predecessor of the A12 road passing through Rumford (Romford), Burntwood (Brentwood), Chelmsford, Colchester, Ipswich, Woodbridge, Beckles and finally to Great Yarmouth. The 'Ipswich to South Town and Bungay Turnpike' turnpike trust was established in 1785, operating between Ipswich and Great Yarmouth. By 1800 Ipswich was a prosperous town with a population of 11,000 and an Act of Parliament titled 'Ipswich Paving Act 1793' formed a body of men called the Paving Commissioners who were responsible for 'paving, lighting, cleansing, and otherwise improving the Town of Ipswich'. Street name plates had started to be used in 1778.

John Kirby reported in 1732 that the trade in the town had recently reduced and that there had been 20 ships a year built in the town and having seen over 200 ships belonging to the town in the port during the winter. Pennington produced a map of the town in 1778.

The first abortive proposals to make the River Orwell navigable as far as Stowmarket were raised in 1719 but were dropped after objections from the Ipswich Corporation. Further plans were raised in 1790 and the work was completed by 1793 after which numerous maltings were soon operating in Stowmarket. The cost of the work on what was sometimes referred to as the 'Stowmarket Canal' was £26,380.

The Ipswich Steam Navigation Company was formed in 1824/1825 during a period of 'steamship mania'. It started a steamer service between Ipswich and London calling at Walton on the Naze

=== Victorian expansion ===
The Ipswich wet dock was dug in 1842 to accommodate booming commercial coastal trade. The first railway station opened in Ipswich in 1846 providing services to Colchester and London using the Great Eastern Main Line and to Bury St Edmunds using the Ipswich to Ely Line. Services to Norwich started in 1849, to Cambridge in 1851 and in 1859 the East Suffolk Line provided services as far as Great Yarmouth. The station moved to its current location in 1860. The Highway Act 1835 had introduced legislation placed the responsibility of maintenance of roads with the parish surveyor (and also introduced a number of 'rules of the road' such as riding on the left). The Ipswich to South Town and Bungay Turnpike trust was wound up in 1872 following the arrival of the railway. The new county councils took over responsibility for roads and bridges in 1889 following the Local Government Act 1888.

The Tramways Act 1870 (33 & 34 Vict. c. 78) encouraged the introduction of tramways and a Horse tramway was introduced in 1879; by 1884 there were three route extensions and the fleet consisted of six single deck and two double deck cars hauled by a pool of 18 horses. The Public Health Act 1875 required towns to have pavements and street lighting (and also effective sewerage systems). The network was compulsorily purchased in 1901 and services stopped in 1903 after which the network we rebuilt as an electric tram network. Ipswich Omnibus Service established a horse-drawn omnibus service in 1898 which competed with the horse tramway by offering lower fares. The omnibuses could not however compete with the electrics trams and ceased operation in 1903 when the trams were introduced.

The Woolwich Steam Packet Company, later the 'London Steamship Company', operated an excursion steamer service between Ipswich and London from before 1871 until 1887; in 1878 one of their ships, the SS Princess Alice sank with the loss of some 700 lives while on an excursion in the Thames estuary. Following the collapse of the 'London Steamship Company' in 1887 the 'London, Woolwich & Clacton-on-Sea Steamboat Company' was formed offering services between London and Clacton; an additional service to Ipswich started in about 1893. The Woolwich Belle acted as a feeder service between Ipswich and Clacton from where the London service operated. After two changes of ownership and ambitious development of both steamer and on-land leisure facilities offering attractions and services at Walton-on-the-Naze, Felixstowe, Southwold and Great Yarmouth the company was wound up in 1905.

=== 20th century ===
Public services of the electric trams started late in 1903 when the population was some 66,000; the trams seated 50 passengers, 24 of whom travelled on the top deck. The tram system was replaced by an electric trolleybus system in 1926. The first trolleybuses ran in Ipswich in 1923 between Cornhill to Ipswich railway station. By 1940, 41 double deck vehicles were in use and a further 25 vehicles delivered between 1948 and 1950. The last trolleybus ran in 1963.

Ipswich Airport opened in 1930 and offered regular flights to Clacton, Southend and Jersey and later to the Netherlands and Manchester. All speed limits for cars were abolished the same year by the Road Traffic Act 1930 only to have a 30 mph urban speed re-introduced by the Road Traffic Act 1934. The first motorbuses operated in 1950, by 1960 a further 51 motorbuses had been purchased and by 1963 when the trolley bus system services ended there was a fleet of 62 motorbuses. In 1959 the Beccles to Great Yarmouth section of the East Suffolk Line was closed and the whole line from Ipswich was threatened with closure as part of the Beeching Axe in the early 1960s.

In 1962 the government appointed consultants to consider the feasibility of expanding Ipswich, Peterborough and Worcester to meet the growing demand from housing from London and Birmingham. In February 1965 Richard Crossman, the minister of Ministry of Housing and Local Government confirmed the go-ahead for Ipswich, Peterborough and Northampton as new Towns using the New Towns Act 1965. A report, Expanding Ipswich published in September 1965 by the consultants, suggested that the population would grow from 120,000 to 250,000 by 1985. Ipswich was rejected at public inquiry in 1969.

Construction of Civic Drive (an urban dual-carriageway), Franciscan Way and associated roundabouts started in 1963 and the new roads opened in 1966. The Spiral Car Park was completed early in 1967.

During the 1980s new sections of the A14 and A12 were built around the west, south and east of the town. The 'Star Lane gyratory' was also constructed and the London road route into town from Copdock and Wherstead Road route were widened.

Title	Road	Date	Note
Bourne Hill Link Road	A137	1982	A new section of road to the east of Bourne Hill from junction 56 of the A14
Ipswich Bypass - A14 Felixstowe & A12 South	A14 (was A45)	1982	Section of A14 from junction 58 (with A12) to Felixstowe?
Ipswich Southern Bypass	A14 (was A45)	1982	Probably what is now the A14 between junctions 55 and 58
Orwell Bridge	A14 (was A45)	1982	Opened at the same time as the 'Ipswich Southern Bypass'
Stoke Bridge	A137	1983	A second bridge over the Orwell by the dock (one for each direction now)
Ostrich Creek Bridge	A137	1983	another parallel bridge near the marina by Bourne Park
Star Lane Extension	A1022	1984	Extension of Star Lane (a very minor street) from its original eastern end at Pleasant Row to the junction with Waterworks Street.
Eastern Bypass	A12	1984	From A14 junction 58 to Martlesham
Eastern Gyratories	A1156	1984	Possibly work to Bond St, Grimwade St?
Copdock - Washbrook Bypass	A12	1984	New section of A12 from Capel St Mary to A14 junction 56.
Ipswich Western Bypass	A14 (was A45)	1985	A14 from junction 53 (Bury Road/ASDA) to Junction 55 (Copdock roundabout)
Martlesham Bypass	A12	1987	section of the A12 to the north of Martlesham

In 1984 the East Suffolk Line was reduced to single-track in places making it impossible to run an hourly service from Ipswich in the direction of Lowestoft. There are now plans to dual an additional section of the line to allow an hourly service. In 1986, following deregulation the bus operation was transfer to a new private company, Ipswich Buses. In 1989 the conservative government published the Roads for Prosperity white paper which was heralded as the 'largest road building program for the UK since the Romans' which would have resulted in the A12 being widened to dual 3 lane between Ipswich and London and to dual 2 lane as far as Lowestoft; the A140 to Norwich would have been widened to dual 2 lane. Plans were greatly scaled back after major road protests at Newbury bypass and Twyford Down and other locations.

The final section of the A14 road between Ipswich and the M6 motorway was opened in 1991. Ipswich Airport was de-licensed in 1996 and the area was re-developed into the residential district of Ravenswood with the front of the Grade II listed control building, designed by Hening and Chitty in 1938, integrated into the new scheme.

=== 21st century ===
Crown Street car park with 1000 bays was closed in November 2009 due to long standing structural problems with the concrete after a routine inspection. The car park building has now been demolished, but what would have been the first floor of the building still operates as a car park, with part of the old building's staircase and elevator shaft still in use. Changes were made to the Duke Street-Fore Hamlet area, funded through the Community Infrastructure Fund in 2010 to improve connections to and from the redeveloped waterfront area.

== Current developments ==
=== Travel Ipswich scheme (formerly 'Ipswich Fit for the 21st Century') ===
Ipswich, Transport fit for the 21st Century
- Location: Ipswich
- Proposer: Suffolk County Council
- Status: Under construction
- Cost estimate: £21.5 million
- Completion date: 2014
- Stakeholders: Travel Ipswich website
- Geometry: KML
- Map: Map Showing pedestrian and cycling routes

Work on this £21.5 million scheme started in September 2012 with an estimated completion date of July 2014.

The focus of the works is the development of sustainable travel links in and connecting to the town centre, which will have been outfitted with Urban Traffic Management and Control equipment. Eight routes have been selected to be the focus of the development as Suffolk County Council:

- Major's Corner - the Waterfront via Upper Orwell Street
- Northgate Street - the Waterfront via Upper Brook Street
- Woodbridge Road - the Waterfront via Grimwade Street
- Ipswich Railway Station - Princes Street via Ipswich Village
- Ipswich Railway Station - the Waterfront via Cardinal Park
- Norwich Road - Princes Street via Portman Road
- The Buttermarket - St Helen's Street via Tacket Street
- Henley Road - Fonnereau Road via Willis Building

The borough council also plans to expand both bus stations to facilitate the creation of new bus routes linking the town centre with housing developments towards the outskirts of town. Bus priority measures as well as real time passenger information system displays at bus stops is also planned to be implemented. The development of the bus services will tie in with the County Council's creation of travel plans for businesses and schools based in Ipswich.

The roundabout by the Willis Building has been removed and the subways have been filled. A signalised junction with toucan crossings has been constructed.

== Proposed developments ==
=== Ipswich Wet Dock Crossing ===
Ipswich Borough Council has proposed to build a controversial new road across the lock gate to the Ipswich dock and the New Cut. The new road would start on Holywells Road across a swing-bridge by the lock gates and then across the New Cut to Hawes Street. The scheme was not supported by Suffolk County Council (who are the transport authority), and was not included in the 2006–2011 Suffolk Local Transport Plan or in their plans for the subsequent Local Transport Plan who estimate that the scheme would cost £79m. The proposal was raised again in October 2014 by the MP Ben Gummer, with support from the County Council, the NewAnglia Local Enterprise Partnership, the university and the port authority.

=== Ipswich Northern Bypass ===
Ipswich Northern Bypass
- Location: Suffolk
- Proposer: Ipswich Borough Council
- Type: road
- Cost estimate: £90 million
- Start date: 2016

The Borough Council has included a proposed Ipswich Northern Bypass that would connect from the A14 to the west of Ipswich passing to the north of Westerfield and Rushmere through the Fynn Valley and probably run from the A12 road close to the park and ride site. The Borough Council feels that this road, which falls outside of the borough of Ipswich, is a necessary part of the town's infrastructure and are encouraging Suffolk County Council as well as the East Suffolk and Mid Suffolk districts to bring the scheme, which it estimates would £90 million, forward for consideration. It could be considered for construction after 2016. A footnote at the end of the Local Development Framework states that only one of the Northern Bypass and Wet Dock Crossing may need to be built.

=== Other proposals ===
Ipswich Borough Council has aspirations for an East Bank Link Road, which would join the A14 and Ipswich Port, in a bid to alleviate congestion over the Orwell Bridge. However, due to lack of Highway Agency support as well as active opposition from the Suffolk Wildlife Trust and others, Ipswich Borough Council is not proposing the link road at this time.

There are private proposals to introduce more car-club cars within Ipswich itself although these do not yet have the active support of the council.

== See also ==
- Ipswich engine shed

== Sources ==
- Twinch C (2008). The history of Ipswich. Breedon Books Publishing. ISBN 978-1-85983-625-5.
- Aldridge M (1979). The British new towns: a programme without a policy. Taylor & Francis. ISBN 978-0-7100-0356-0.
