= Transport in Cambridge =

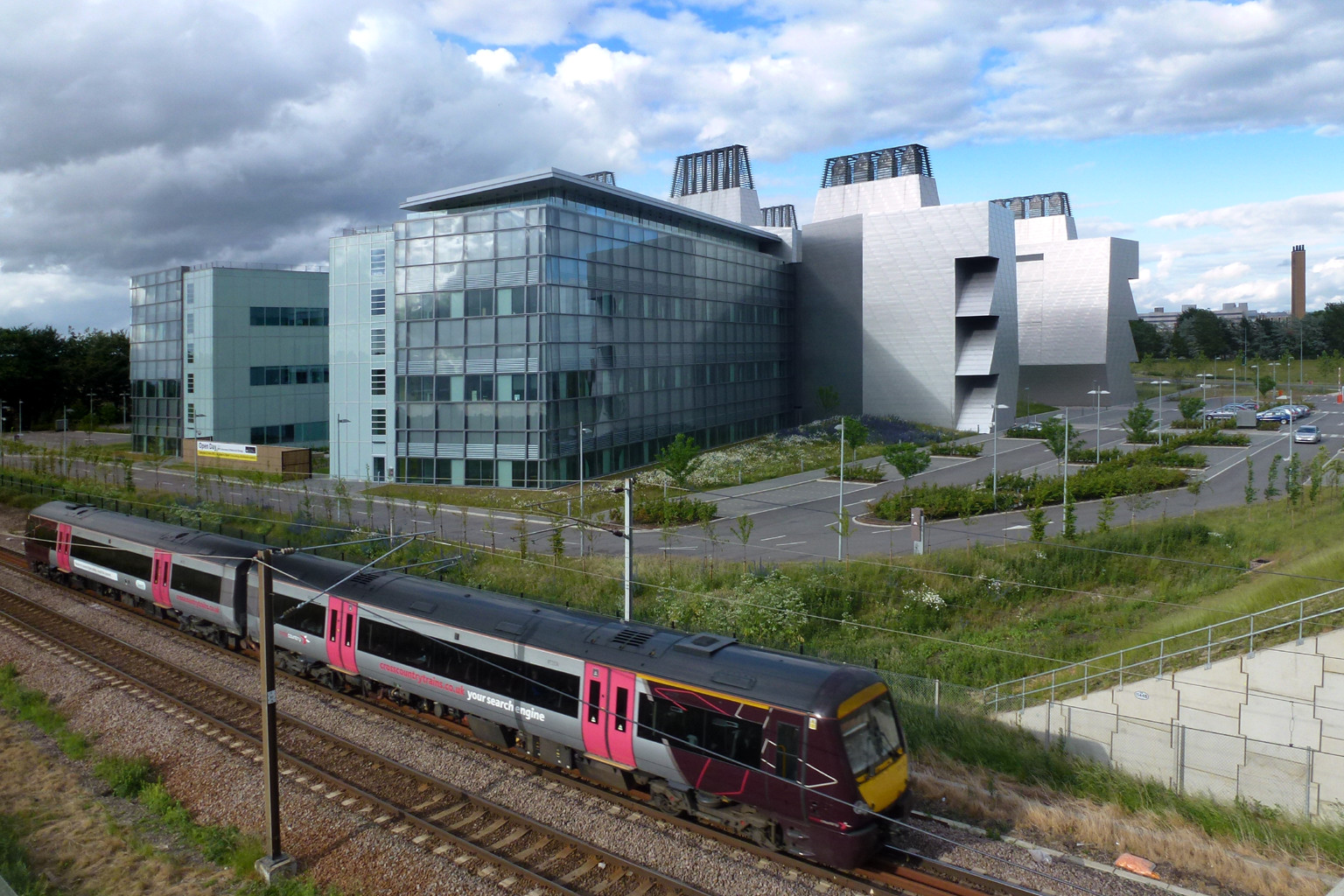
A CrossCountry Class 170 train to Stansted Airport passing behind the Laboratory of Molecular Biology, viewed from the Busway bridge.

Cambridge is a university town and the administrative centre of the county of Cambridgeshire, England. It lies in East Anglia about 50 miles (80 km) north of London. Its main transport links are the M11 road to London, the A14 east–west road and the West Anglia Main Line railway to London.

== Buses ==
Cambridge has several bus services including routes linking five Park and Ride sites all of which operate seven days a week and are aimed at encouraging motorists to park near the city's edge. Since 7 August 2011, the Cambridgeshire Guided Busway has bus services running into the centre of Cambridge.

Most buses run to and from the bus station located on Drummer Street in the heart of the city, although there are significant interchanges at the railway station and at Addenbrooke's Hospital. The principal operator is Stagecoach.

On 30 October 2022, Stagecoach cancelled 18 Cambridgeshire bus routes due to "significant falls in passenger numbers". Stagecoach has received a lot of backlash for this decision, including from the mayor of Cambridgeshire and Peterborough, Dr Nik Johnson.

=== The Busway ===
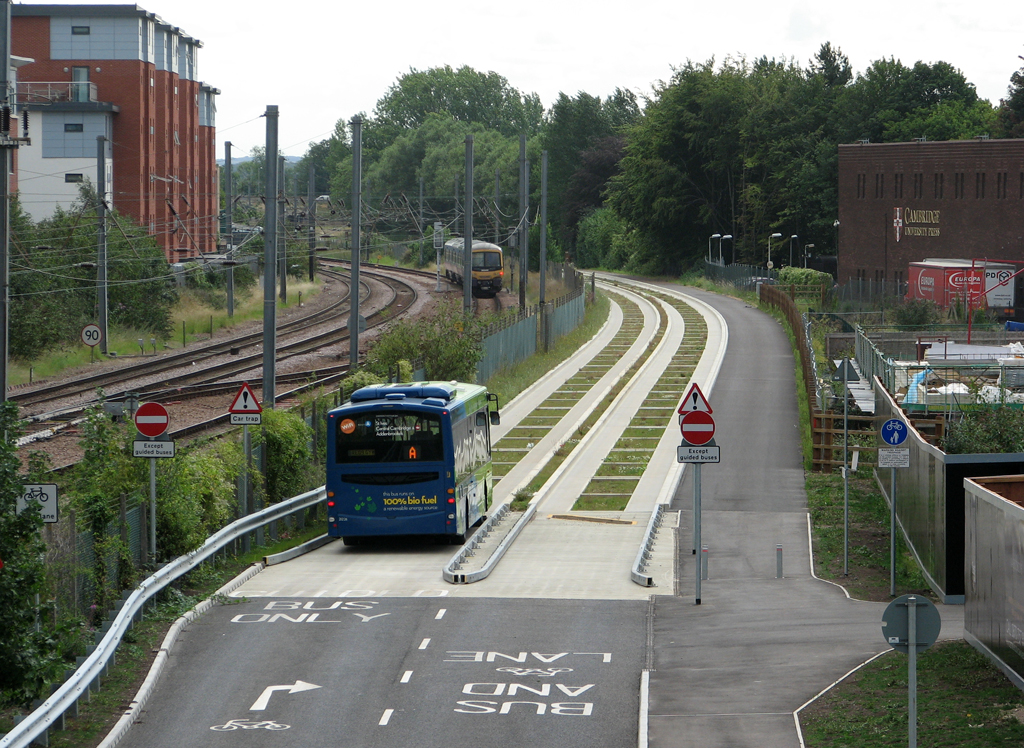
A guided bus entering the concrete busway track

Cambridgeshire Guided Busway is the world's longest guided busway and passes through Cambridge. The designated route runs on normal road from Huntingdon to St Ives, then via a bus-only guided section along the former Cambridge-St Ives railway south-east into Cambridge, where it rejoins the road at either Milton Road or Histon Road and then continues to Cambridge railway station on normal roads. From there it is again guided to Addenbrooke's Hospital and Trumpington Park and Ride. An additional short spur, to Cambridge North railway station, opened in 2017.

The scheme, budgeted at £116.2 million, had been scheduled to open in early 2009 but did not open until August 2011. The scheme had been heavily criticised by campaigners who believed that the route would be better served by restoring the previous railway route.

=== Cambridge Park & Ride ===
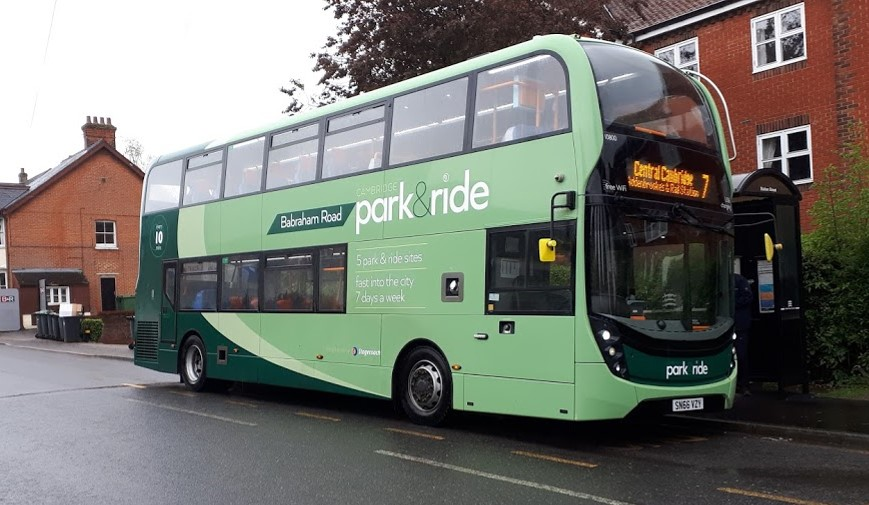
A Stagecoach in Cambridge Park & Ride Enviro 400

The city is served by a seven days a week park and ride service run by Cambridgeshire County Council and Stagecoach. Five sites on the outskirts of the city or just outside its boundaries – at Babraham Road, Madingley Road, Milton, Newmarket Road and Trumpington – provide over 4,500 parking spaces, electric car charging and other facilities. Buses run from these sites into the city centre up to every 7 minutes.

== Roads ==
Because of its rapid growth in the 20th century, Cambridge has a congested road network. Several major roads intersect at Cambridge. The M11 motorway from North-East London terminates to the north-west of the city where it joins the A14. Skirting the northern edge of Cambridge, the A14 is a major freight route which connects the port of Felixstowe on the east coast with the Midlands, North Wales, the west coast and Ireland. The A14 was often congested, particularly the section between Huntingdon and Cambridge that used to only have 2 lanes. However, the A14 upgrade scheme has attempted to address the problem, with this section now upgraded to 3 lanes in each direction, and dual 4 lanes at the Girton interchange. Cambridge is situated on the A10, a former Roman road from north London to Ely and King's Lynn. The A428 connects the city with Bedford and St Neots, and the A1303 to Newmarket and beyond to Colchester.

Some roads around the city have been designated as forming a ring road about a mile and a half in diameter, inside which there are traffic restrictions.

There are five council car parks in the city centre. There are limited numbers of metered bays offering parking for up to 1–8 hours across the city

=== Cycling ===
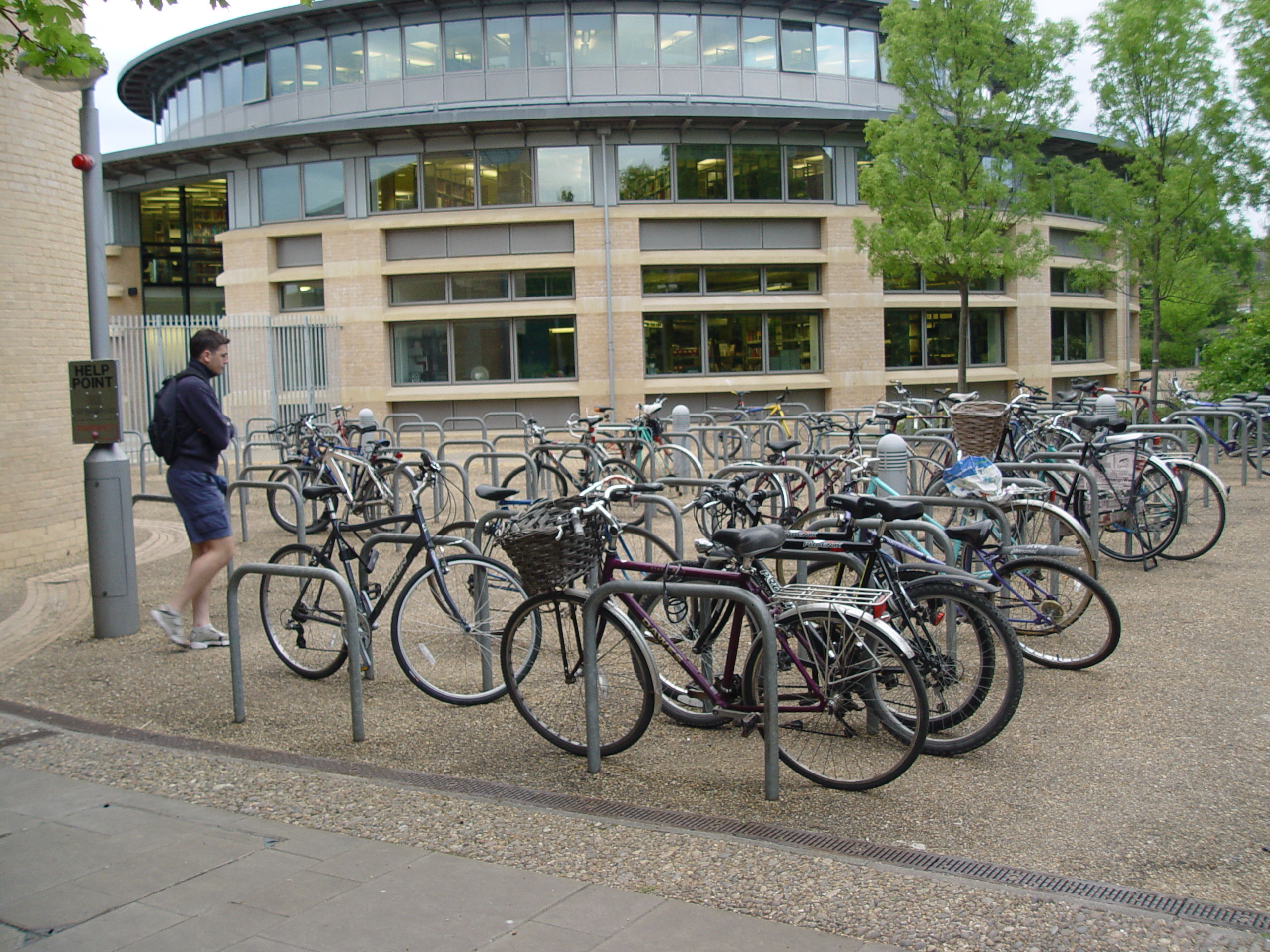
Some colleges and workplaces have large bicycle parks.

As a university town lying on fairly flat ground and with traffic congestion, Cambridge has a large number of cyclists. Many residents also prefer cycling to driving in the narrow, busy streets, giving the city the highest level of cycle use in the UK. According to the 2001 census, 25% of residents travelled to work by bicycle. A few roads within the city are adapted for cycling, including separate traffic lights for cycle lanes and cycle contraflows on streets which are otherwise one-way; the city also benefits from parks which have shared use paths. There are, however, no separate cycle paths within the city centre. Despite the high levels of cycling, expenditure on cycling infrastructure is around the national average of 0.3% of the transport budget. There are a few cycle routes in the surrounding countryside and the city is now linked to the National Cycle Network. The main organisation campaigning to improve conditions for cyclists in Cambridge is the Cambridge Cycling Campaign. The city was chosen as a Cycling Town by the Department for Transport in 2008, with central government funding an expansion of cycling facilities in the city and its surrounding villages. There was a 5% increase in cycling from 2013 to 2014 – an increase of 88% since 2004.

Bike theft in the city is a problem, with over 3,000 bicycles reported stolen between April 2005 and March 2006. The actual number is believed to be higher as many thefts are not reported to the police.

== Rail ==
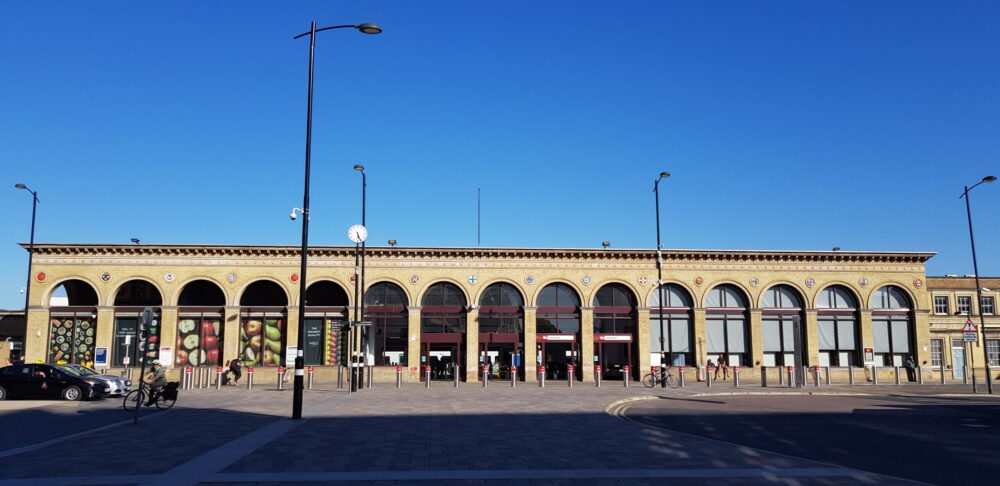
The front of Cambridge Railway Station

Cambridge currently has three railway stations. Cambridge railway station was built in 1845 with a platform designed to take two full-length trains, the third longest in the country. Cambridge North railway station is located in the suburb of Chesterton, close to Cambridge Science Park, and opened in May 2017. Cambridge South, adjacent to the Cambridge Biomedical Campus, opened on 28 June 2026. All stations are run by Greater Anglia.

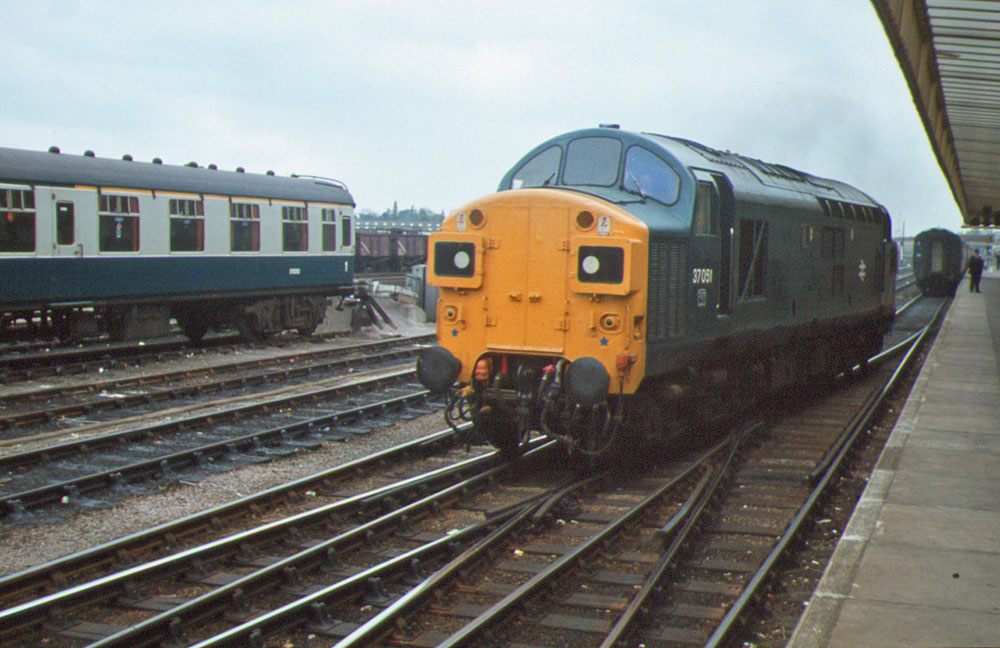
A British Rail Class 37 at Cambridge on the diamond crossing under British Rail.

Cambridge has direct rail links to London with termini at London King's Cross (on the Hitchin-Cambridge Line and the East Coast Main Line) and Liverpool Street (on the West Anglia Main Line). There is a direct shuttle service to King's Cross every half-hour during off peak hours. Peak hour trains to King's Cross have additional stops. Future developments for the Cambridge to London line include the provision of 125 miles per hour (201 km/h) high speed trains.

Aside from London, Cambridge is linked by rail to King's Lynn and Ely (via the Fen Line), Norwich (via the Breckland Line), Leicester, Birmingham New Street, Ipswich and Stansted Airport. The important UK rail hub of Peterborough is also less than an hour from Cambridge, which provides direct connections to Leeds, Newcastle and Edinburgh Waverley.

=== Proposed developments ===
==== East West Rail ====
The railway service connecting Cambridge and Oxford, known as the Varsity Line, ceased in 1968. The East West Rail proposal plans to reinstate a direct rail route to Oxford, possibly by 2030.

== Air ==
The nearest passenger services are from London Stansted Airport at 28 miles (45 km) and London Luton Airport at 32 miles (51 km), Birmingham Airport at 91 miles (146 km), London Gatwick Airport at 93 miles (150 km) and London Heathrow Airport at 70 miles (113 km) all being about 90 minutes' travel, and the smaller London City Airport at 57 miles (92 km) approximately 75 minutes' travel.

The city's own airport is Cambridge Airport (formerly Marshall Airport Cambridge UK and originally Teversham Aerodrome) and is owned by Marshall Aerospace. There are no scheduled passenger services, though the runway can accommodate an unladen Boeing 747 or MD-11 and ScotAirways used to make scheduled flights to Amsterdam Schiphol Airport. The airport is used mainly by business, leisure and training flights, and to fly in aircraft for maintenance. In 2004 a charter service to Jersey was operated and flights to other European destinations such as Gothenburg were operated on either a scheduled or charter basis. At the end of January 2016 all scheduled and charter flights from the airport were halted due to a lack of passenger numbers.

A dealer in fibreglass-moulded light monoplanes is also based at the airport. The airport and nearby land have been marked for re-development, with approximately 10,000 to 12,000 new homes to be built.

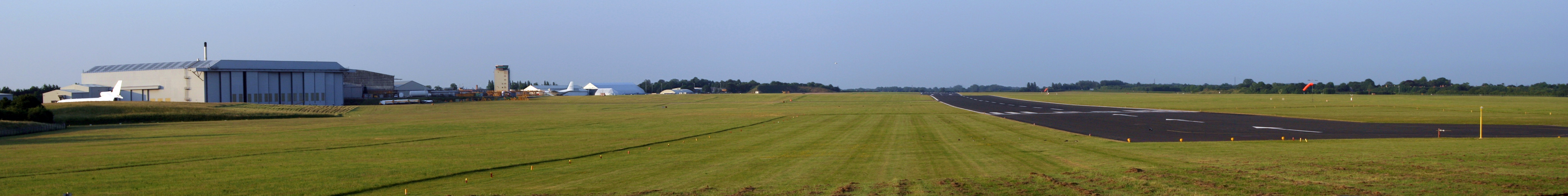
Panorama of Cambridge Airport from the south in July 2013

== Past developments ==
Project Cambridge
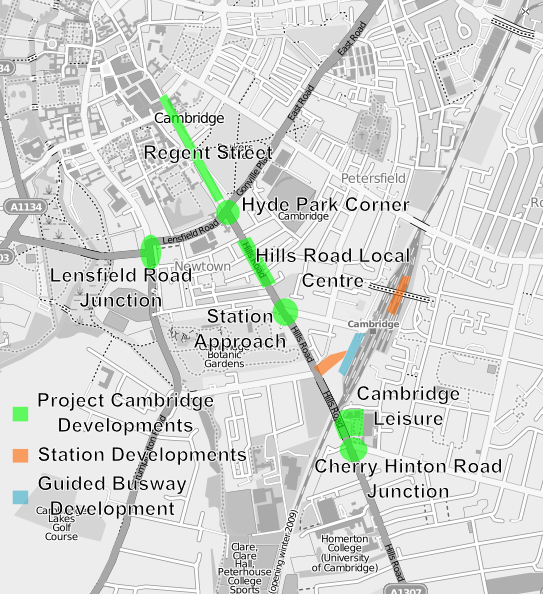
- Project Cambridge developments.
- Location: Cambridge
- Proposer: Cambridgeshire County Council
- Status: proposed
- Type: multi-modal
- Cost estimate: £25 million

Several developments to the transport system in Cambridge have been proposed by Cambridgeshire County Council.

=== The Holford-Wright Report ===
In 1950, a city plan for Cambridge was published. Chaired by Sir William Holford, an eminent architect and planner, it proposed a set of changes with a relief road for the centre of Cambridge, which would have destroyed terraced housing and other areas. These plans were, however, never implemented.

=== Project Cambridge ===
In 2009 the County Council revealed its plans to spend £25 million on renovating the area from Regent Street to the Cherry Hinton Road Junction, entitled Project Cambridge. The scheme is composed of many smaller projects with common themes of making junctions easier for pedestrians to cross, promoting cycle use and reducing traffic. The scheme is to be funded through tax increment financing where the money would initially be borrowed and would be repaid over 25 years from increases in business tax revenue. The scheme was due to be discussed by councillors in October 2009.

=== Cambridge Gateway ===
The area around Cambridge railway station, was extensively redeveloped between 2010 and 2022. The station capacity was increased to match usage, and the surrounding industrial area and office blocks were replaced with flats, offices, student accommodation, 3000-space cycle park, a hotel and shops. at an estimated cost of £3.1 million. The redevelopment of the Cambridge Station area has been given the green light and has been awarded £1.5 million of central government money to help pay for the scheme. The Hills Road Bridge safety scheme is still included in the project.

== Greater Cambridge Partnership ==
The Greater Cambridge Partnership (GCP) is a local delivery body for a City Deal with central government created in 2014, envisaging an investment of £500 million, mainly transport investment, over 15 years to create growth in the greater Cambridge area. Its four partners are Cambridge City Council, Cambridgeshire County Council, South Cambridgeshire District Council, and the University of Cambridge.

In February 2022, the joint assembly of the Greater Cambridge Partnership considered ideas towards shifting away from car use.

In August 2022, the Greater Cambridge Partnership proposed plans for a Cambridge Sustainable Travel Zone based on a £5 congestion charge for cars and some other vehicles, coupled with £1 bus fares for single journeys to encourage use of buses.

A consultation on proposals for the Sustainable Travel Zone ended in December 2022.

== See also ==
- Transport in East Anglia
