= Public transport in Colchester =

Transport system in Colchester, Essex, England

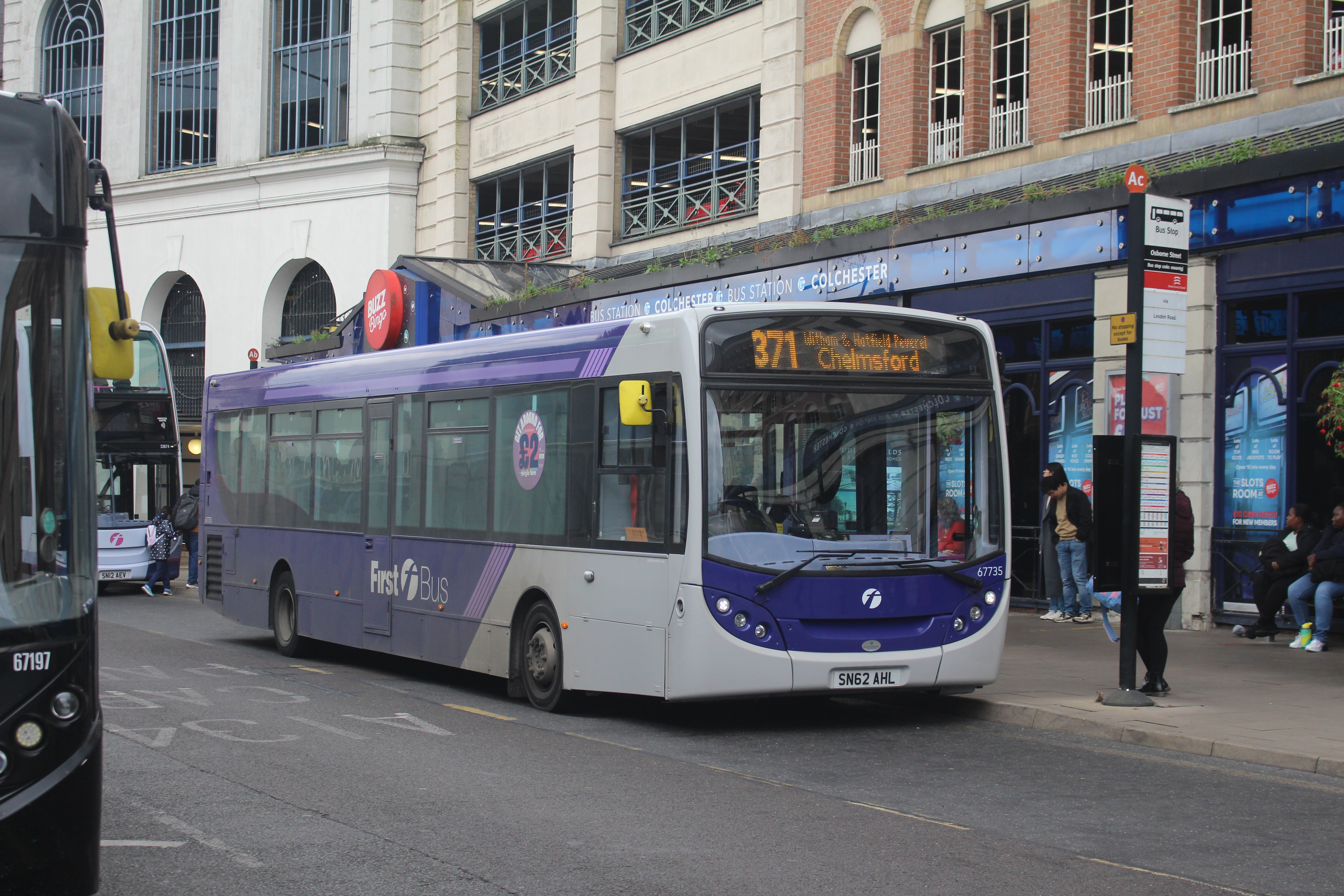
- A First Essex bus in the city centre

Overview
- Locale: Colchester and surrounding regions
- Transit type: Bus, Bus rapid transit, Rail

Operation
- Operators: First Essex, Arriva Colchester, Hedingham & Chambers, Greater Anglia

The public transport infrastructure of Colchester comprises multiple modes of transport, including buses and railways.

== Buses ==
Colchester bus station is located on Osborne Street; it serves as the central hub for the majority of bus services and the interconnected public transport network in the city. Additionally, there are plans underway for a comprehensive redevelopment of the bus station, aimed at modernising its facilities, enhancing passenger experience and accommodating future transport needs.

There are two main bus operators in the city: First Essex and Arriva Colchester, which operate most of the lines within the city. Secondary operators include Central Connect (formerly Konectbus), Beeston's, Ipswich Buses, Stephensons of Essex and Panther Travel (Essex); these usually operate multi-county/county-wide routes or to rural villages on the outskirts of Colchester, as well as school services.

National Express operates coach services. It stopped operating its stop at Osborne Street in 2020 due to "safety concerns."

== Bus rapid transit ==
The Colchester rapid transit system is a bus rapid transit system, which will serve the central city and its suburbs.

It is set to have one route and eight stations, terminating in the proposed new garden community. The segregated busway portion runs along the Northern Approach Road.

Phase 1 of the project, incorporating a segregated busway alongside the Northern Approach Road, was completed in October 2025. Phase 2, incorporating new bus lanes alongside Clingoe Hill, opened in 2026.

== Railway ==
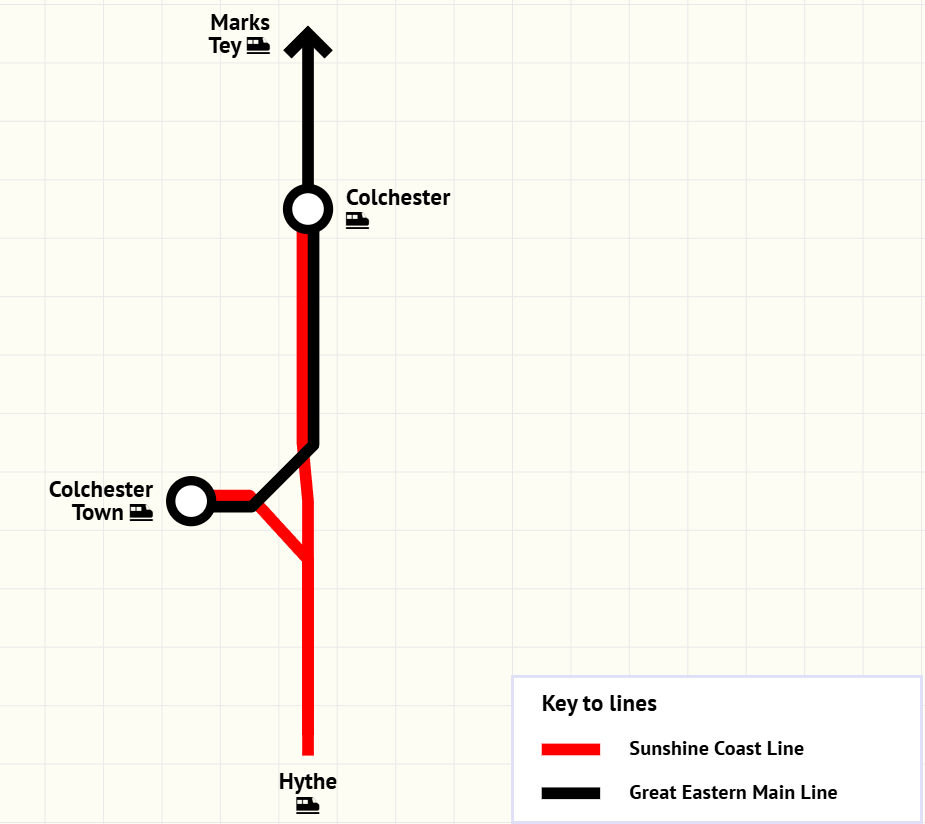
Railway System of Colchester

Colchester has three railway stations:

- Colchester (also known as Colchester North), the principal station that serves the city.
- Colchester Town
- Hythe.

There are two lines that pass through Colchester:

- Great Eastern Main Line between London Liverpool Street, Ipswich and Norwich
- Sunshine Coast Line, to Clacton-on-Sea and Walton-on-the-Naze.

All services are operated by Greater Anglia.

== See also ==
- Transport in the UK
- Colchester Rapid Transit
