= Buses in Lowestoft =

Bus services in Lowestoft, Suffolk, England

Buses in Lowestoft in the English county of Suffolk provide public transport in and around the town. Buses were first introduced in the town by Lowestoft Corporation Tramways in 1927 and replaced original tram services by 1931.

== History ==
The corporation became Waveney District Council in 1974 and bus services taken over by Eastern Counties in 1977. The bus garage is on Rotterdam Road is still standing.

After bus deregulation in 1986 a range of operators took over services. In 2013 bus services in the town were operated by First Eastern Counties, Anglian Bus and Coaches, Nightingales of Beccles, Belle Coaches and Ambassador Travel.

== Routes ==
Routes within the town generally operate along key corridors linking the town centre with areas around the edge of the town. Services generally operate regularly during the day, becoming significantly less frequent during the evening. Some services, such as an orbital route around the town, are part funded by public money.

Bus services tend to be focussed on the bus station in the town centre, although the redevelopment of Lowestoft railway station aims to make the station a key interchange for bus routes as well. Traffic congestion, especially difficulty crossing Lake Lothing which cuts the town in two, can cause delays to bus services. Bus routes also connect the town to Norwich, Great Yarmouth and Peterborough as well as to surrounding villages and market towns and tourist destinations such as Pleasurewood Hills.

| Operator | Route number | Origin | Via | Destination |
|---|---|---|---|---|
| Anglian Bus | 601 | Lowestoft | N/A | Great Yarmouth |
| Anglian Bus | 61 | Southwold | Kessingland, Lowestoft | Great Yarmouth |
| Anglian Bus | 61A | Lowestoft | N/A | Pleasurewood Hills |
| Anglian Bus | 7 | Southwold | Kessingland, Lowestoft, Great Yarmouth | Norwich |
| First Norfolk & Suffolk | 99 | Lowestoft | Kessingland | Southwold |
| First Norfolk & Suffolk | X2 | Lowestoft | N/A | Norwich |
| First Norfolk & Suffolk | X1 | Lowestoft | Great Yarmouth, Acle | Norwich |
| First Norfolk & Suffolk | 1/1A | Lowestoft | Great Yarmouth | Martham |
| Border Bus | 146 | Southwold | Kessingland, Lowestoft | Norwich |
| First Norfolk & Suffolk | X21 | Lowestoft | Barnby, North Cove | Norwich |
| First Norfolk & Suffolk | X22 | Lowestoft | Carlton Colville, Barnby, North Cove | Norwich |
| First Norfolk & Suffolk | 101 | Lowestoft | N/A | Hollow Grove |
| First Norfolk & Suffolk | 102 | Lowestoft | N/A | Oulton |
| First Norfolk & Suffolk | 103 | Lowestoft | N/A | Carlton Colville |
| First Norfolk & Suffolk | 105 | Lowestoft | N/A | Rock Estate |

== Anglian Bus ==
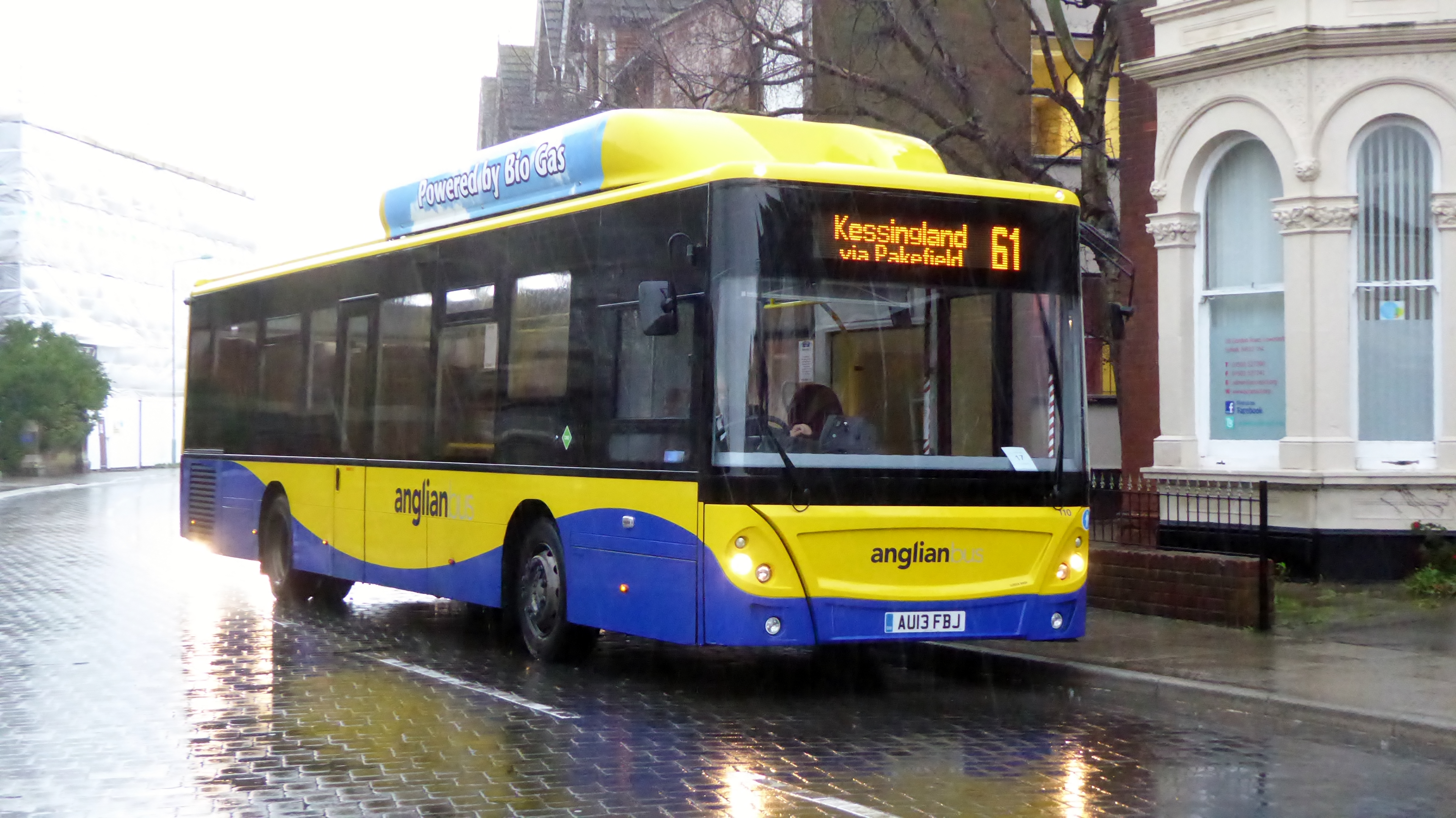
Anglian Bus in Lowestoft

Anglian Bus, formed in 1981, was a bus service that ran services in Lowestoft until November 2017 when the company merged with KonectBus.

The service provided the 601 route in the town, which later changed to the 61, then 7 and back to 61. At first it ran between the Lowestoft Bus Station and Market Gates in Great Yarmouth. The route then expanded to include Kessingland and Southwold. A new route that shadowed the 61, called the 61A, was formed that took passengers straight to Pleasurewood Hills and into the park. This route was discontinued not long after it was formed. 61 merged with 7, the service taking passengers from Great Yarmouth to Norwich, to provide one long route from Southwold to Norwich via Lowestoft and Yarmouth. A year or so later, the two routes separated again.

== First Eastern Counties ==
First Eastern Counties is a division of FirstGroup that run a number of local services on top of routes taking passengers out of the town. The X1 route, which is part of the major Excel franchise, runs between Lowestoft and Norwich via Great Yarmouth and Acle as well as three feeder routes for the Excel: X2, X21 and X22, which run on a more direct route to Norwich and includes rural towns and villages such as Barnby and Loddon. Coastal Clippers, 1A, 1 and 99, also depart from the bus station.
