= Norwich Airport =

Civilian airport in Norwich, Norfolk, England

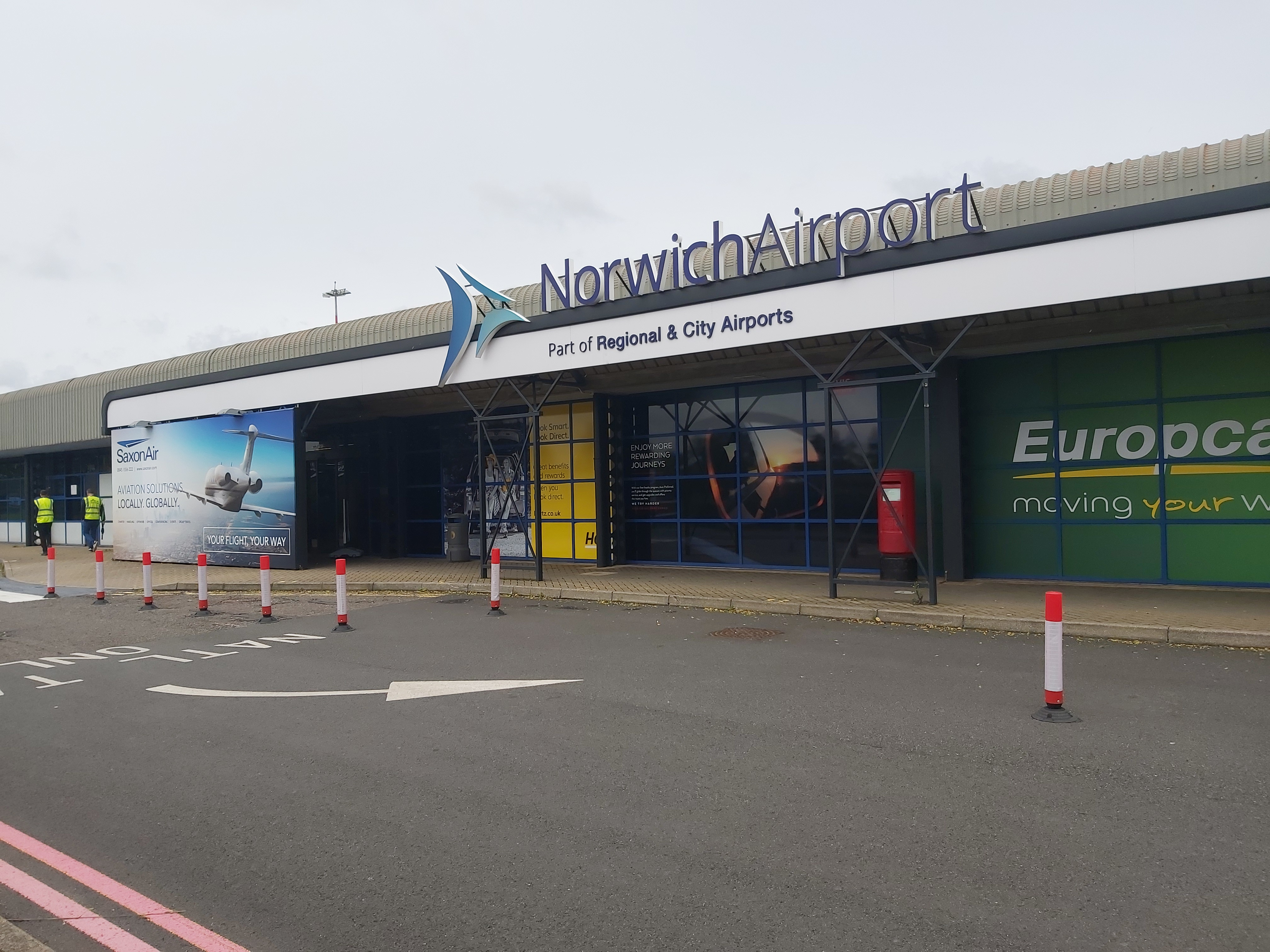
- IATA: NWI; ICAO: EGSH

Summary
- Airport type: Public
- Owner: Regional & City Airports
- Operator: Norwich Airport Limited
- Serves: Norwich, Norfolk
- Opened: 1968; 58 years ago
- Focus city for: TUI Airways
- Built: 1939; 87 years ago (as RAF Horsham St Faith)
- Elevation AMSL: 36 m (118 ft)
- Coordinates: 52°40′33″N 01°16′58″E
- Website: www.norwichairport.co.uk

Map
- Location in Norfolk EGSH (England)

Runways
Direction	Length		Surface
Direction	m	ft	Surface
09/27	1,841	6,040	asphalt concrete

Statistics (2025)
- Passengers: 446052
- Passenger change 24-25: ▲7.46%
- Aircraft movements: 26,493
- Movements change 24-25: ▼12.4%
- Sources: UK AIP at NATS; Statistics from the UK Civil Aviation Authority

Norwich Airport (IATA: NWI, ICAO: EGSH) is an international airport in Hellesdon, Norfolk, England, 2.5 miles (4.0 kilometres) north of the city of Norwich. In 2023, Norwich Airport was the 25th busiest airport in the UK and busiest in East Anglia.

Norwich Airport has a Civil Aviation Authority (CAA) Public Use Aerodrome Licence that allows flights for the public transport of passengers or for flying instruction. Along with a long history of flights to Amsterdam Airport Schiphol via KLM Cityhopper, it offers flights to various destinations in the United Kingdom and Europe. Besides the commercial flights, charter operators also operate from Norwich. Bristow Helicopters, DanCopter, and Babcock Mission Critical Services Offshore fly crews to North Sea gas and oil rigs, and SaxonAir operates executive, private aircraft and helicopter charter flights.

The airport was established on the aerodrome site of RAF Horsham St Faith, a former Royal Air Force station in the early 1970s, under the ownership of the local authorities. It was later sold into private ownership.

== History ==
The first Norwich Airport was created as a former First World War aerodrome on Mousehold Heath, on what is now the Heartsease housing estate. It opened in 1933 and was used by Boulton & Paul for aircraft test flying and other recreational activities. This aerodrome fell into disuse in the early part of the Second World War.

=== RAF Horsham St Faith ===
The current site, formerly known as Royal Air Force Station Horsham St Faith, or more commonly RAF Horsham St Faith, was first developed in 1939 and officially opened on 1 June 1940 as a Royal Air Force (RAF) bomber station. In September 1942, Horsham St. Faith was made available to the United States Army Air Forces (USAAF) for use by the Eighth Air Force. The USAAF designated the airfield as Station 123 (HF).

The airfield was subsequently transferred to RAF Fighter Command on 10 July 1945, when it was occupied by four Gloster Meteor Squadrons. RAF Horsham St Faith was a front-line RAF station for many years, and its squadrons participated in many post-war exercises. The station was deactivated on 1 August 1963.

=== Civil airport ===
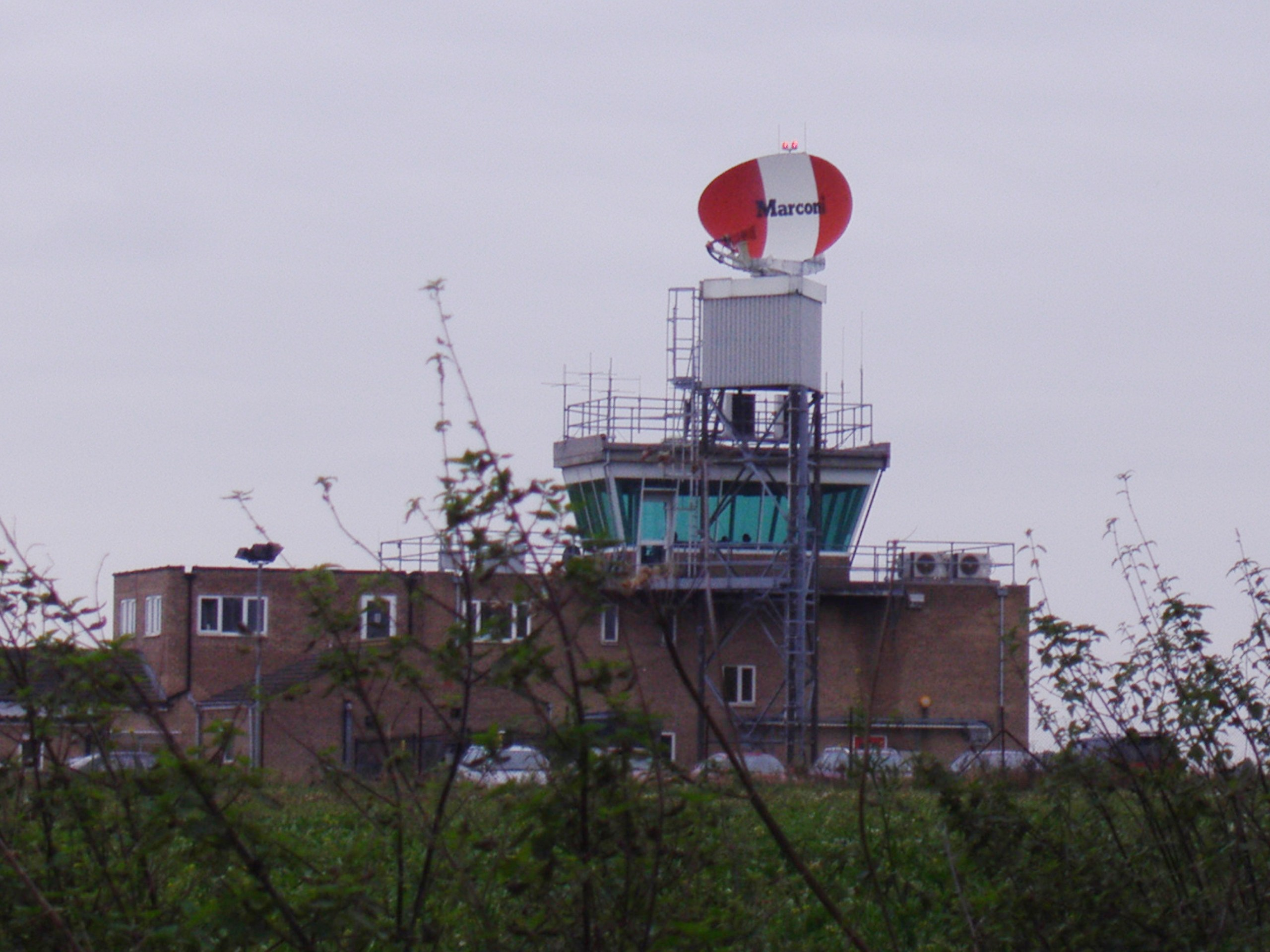
Control tower at Norwich International Airport

The RAF left Horsham on 24 March 1967. Over the following two years, the major part of the airfield and buildings were sold to Norwich City Council and Norfolk County Council, a small part being retained by the Ministry of Defence (MoD). Norwich Airport Limited, under joint ownership of the county and city councils, developed the modern day Norwich International Airport. In 1971, the airport began operations with charter flights, with airline Air Anglia creating a base at the airfield, offering flights to north-western Europe. Their route to Amsterdam is still operated today with KLM Cityhopper.

Most of the World War II buildings used by the USAAF and RAF remain, although converted for a variety of purposes. Some of the pre-war hangars are used for aircraft maintenance and one of them has been converted into an aviation academy. The original military control tower still exists, although only the ground floor is used as the upper floors are now condemned. A new control tower has been built adjacent to the present main runway. Other wartime buildings now form part of the Norwich Airport Industrial Estate. Adjacent to the airport terminal building opened by the Queen Mother, inside the terminal there is a memorial display relating to the USAAF, consisting of photographs, paintings, and a plaque commemorating the American use of the airfield. Outside the east end of the terminal there is a permanent memorial dedicated to both the RAF and USAAF.

Since 1985, the City of Norwich Aviation Museum has been located on the north of the airport, with 19 aircraft on display. It was founded in 1977 by employees of the Eastern Counties Omnibus Company, on the 17/35 runway. In 1988, the new terminal building was opened.

Whilst most runways and taxiways from the military airfield remain, only one runway is primarily used; to avoid takeoffs and landings over built-up areas: Runway 09/27, which was extended eastwards by the RAF in 1956 to 1,841 metres (6,040 feet) long. The 04/22 runway is no longer used for takeoffs or landings, but is used for parking and taxiing of aircraft.

In 1999, the new corporate identity was launched as Norwich International Airport. In March 2004, the city and county councils sold 80.1% of Norwich Airport Limited to Omniport, whilst retaining the remaining 19.9%. Omniport has also acquired 100% of Norwich Airport Travel Limited (the separate travel agency located within the airport passenger terminal). Following the sale to Omniport, the airport became one of the UK hubs for budget airline Flybe, and the number of flights and destinations increased. In 2005, a £3.5 million terminal expansion programme began.

In 2009, during filming of the BBC show Top Gear, operations from the airport appeared to be disrupted when a caravan, adapted into an airship and flown by James May, drifted over the airport and violated its controlled airspace. In reality, the event occurred after much pre-planning between the airport authorities and the BBC; scenes showing the airship in the airfield boundary were actually filmed after it had lifted off from the airfield to satisfy the requirements of the film crew.

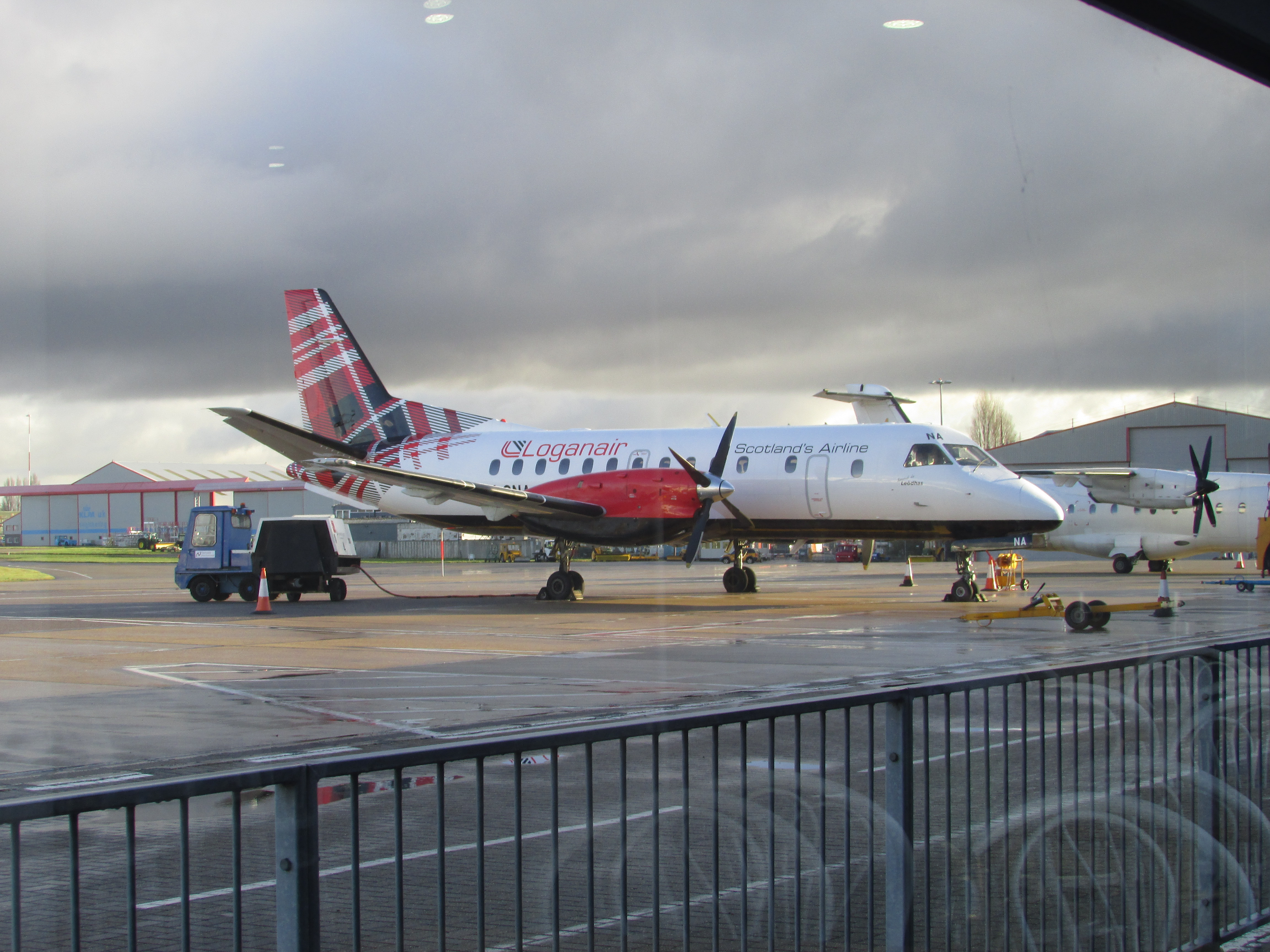
A Loganair Saab 340 parked on the apron at Norwich. Loganair is one of the airport's largest scheduled operators, offering flights to Aberdeen and Jersey.

In 2007, the airport introduced its Airport Development Fee (ADF).

In 2014, the airport was sold by the majority stakeholders of Omniport to the Rigby Group, who integrated the airport as part of Regional & City Airports in April 2017.

Norwich International Airport announced in 2015 that four new routes were being considered for Department for Transport (DfT) funding. These were: Dublin Airport, Paris Charles de Gaulle Airport (both Flybe), Newcastle Airport (Links Air), and Exeter Airport (Flybe). Links Air proposed a start date of 1 September 2016, but the airline was put into liquidation. In November 2015, it was announced that bids for routes to Newcastle and Exeter had been successful, with the inaugural flight to the latter on 24 March 2016. Flybe also confirmed plans to operate summer and winter routes from Norwich Airport as part of a five-year deal with the Regional & City Airports (RCA) group. From spring 2016, Flybe began operating flights from Norwich to Alicante and Málaga.

In 2016, an engine test facility opened on site. The KLM UK Engineering Academy opened on 18 April 2017.

In 2017, Norwich International Airport was rebranded to Norwich Airport. On 6 July 2017, managing director Richard Pace announced a 30-year vision to treble passenger numbers at the airport. The plans included raising annual passenger numbers to 930,000 by 2030, and 1.4 million by 2045, forging new routes to Paris and Dublin, and constructing a 100-acre business park for both aviation and non-aviation companies; it was originally frozen by investors in 2015 waiting for the new Northern Distributor Road to be completed. Further plans included extending Runway 27/09 by 500 metres (1,600 feet) and building new taxiways to boost capacity and allow larger aircraft to operate to the airport. Another 10 year ambition was seeking permission to allow flights to fly until up to 01:30 (currently, the curfew is put in place at 23:00, with the airport placing charges for any arrivals after 21:30) for four nights a week. Pace says the new Broadland Northway (NDR) is "unlocking the potential for the site to generate growth for the region and the airport", and "the masterplan sets out the vision for the future development of Norwich Airport and its continued vital role in supporting our region's economy".

The passenger terminal was refurbished between April 2018 and spring 2019, increasing the number of retail shops and dining options. The airport also invested in upgrade and refurbishment works to the executive lounge at the airport, completed in May 2018.

Flybe ended jet flights from Norwich Airport as of winter 2019/20 due to them returning their Embraer 195 aircraft back to the lessors.

In July 2019, Norfolk County Council and Norwich City Council sold their remaining 19.9% stake in the airport to Regional and City Airports.

=== Developments since 2020 ===
In December 2023, Ryanair announced they would start operating from the airport for the first time. Three new routes were announced to Alicante, Faro and Malta for the summer 2024 season with flights starting on 1 April 2024, with further routes from Ryanair planned. In May 2024, six weeks after launch of operations at Norwich, Ryanair confirmed that Alicante would continue a twice weekly for the winter 24/25 season making it a year-round destination at Norwich once again. It was announced in March 2024 that TUI's leased-in partner Air Explore would operate many of the 2024 summer flights for TUI. Between April and October 2024, 316,000 passengers used the airport, a 23% increase on the previous year.

In August 2026, the airport was affected by strike action from air traffic controllers who were members of the trade union Prospect. They were unable to agree on the terms of a pay rise and maternity/paternity pay. On 28 August 2026, the airport closed for the day. After further disruptions to airport services over the following weeks, on 20 October 2026, it was announced that the dispute had been resolved.

== Facilities ==
=== Runway and apron ===
The airport has one operational runway (designated 09/27), 1,841 metres (6,040 feet) in length. A smaller 1,285 metres (4,216 feet) runway (designated 04/22) was closed in 2006, and is now used as a taxiway (south of runway 09/27) and parking area for decommissioned aircraft (north of runway 09/27). The airport apron has nine parking stands for commercial aircraft.

=== Tenants ===
Operators based at Norwich are CHC Scotia, Bristow Helicopters, NHV Helicopters, SaxonAir, and the East Anglian Air Ambulance.

== Airlines and destinations ==
The following airlines operate regular scheduled services to and from Norwich:

Airlines	Destinations
KLM	Amsterdam
Loganair	Aberdeen; Seasonal: Jersey
LYGG	Charter: Groningen
Ryanair	Alicante, Malaga (begins 29 March 2027); Seasonal: Faro, Malta
TUI Airways	Tenerife–South; Seasonal: Corfu, Dalaman, Heraklion, Ibiza, Menorca, Palma de Mallorca, Paphos, Rhodes

== Accidents and incidents ==
- On 12 December 1973, a Dassault Falcon 20 of Fred. Olsen Airtransport suffered a bird strike on takeoff from runway 27. Both engines failed and the aircraft made an emergency landing in a field. All three crew members were injured, but the passengers were unharmed. The aircraft was written off.
- On 25 October 1974, a Cessna 310 dived into the ground while on final approach, killing the pilot. The Cessna's nose pitched down and the wings rolled over; the loss of control was caused by the uncommanded retraction of the starboard flap, caused by the failure of the drive mechanism.

== Statistics ==
Busiest routes to and from Norwich (2025)
Rank	Destination airport	Total passengers	Change 2024 / 25
1	Amsterdam	127,833	▲5.0%
2	Alicante	70,526	▲11.1%
3	Aberdeen	28,146	▼5.0%
4	Palma de Mallorca	27,320	▲9.8%
5	Tenerife–South	26,540	▼0.8%
6	Malta	24,736	▲21.2%
7	Faro	20,892	▼1.6%
8	Dalaman	15,455	▲1.9%
9	Menorca	14,799	▲0.5%
10	Corfu	9,350	▲3.3%

== Transport ==
=== Bus ===
First Eastern Counties operates the PR1 Norwich Park and Ride service, connecting the airport terminal with Norwich city centre, seven days a week.

Konectbus also operates route 35, "Canary Konect" which travels between The Nest and Carrow Park (for Carrow Road) via the Airport Terminal, Aylsham Road, Anglia Square, Tombland (For Norwich Cathedral and the city centre), Prince of Wales Road and Norwich railway station. This service runs up to every 60 mins, seven days a week.

Konectbus route 512, Sanders Coaches routes 43, X40, 44A, and X44, and First Eastern Counties route 37 all operate from within a ten-minute walk of the terminal.

=== Road ===
Norwich Airport is situated adjacent to the A140 Cromer Road which runs from Ipswich, through Norwich and on to the seaside town of Cromer; this also provides easy road access to Norwich city centre. The entrance to the airport is around 3 miles (4.8 kilometres) from the city centre. The A1270 Broadland Northway (also known as the Norwich Northern Distributor Road or NDR) links the airport to the A47 to Lowestoft in the east and Fakenham in the west, as well as Norwich itself.

=== Rail ===
The nearest station is Norwich, approximately 4 miles (6.4 km) away.
