= Norwich Bus Station =

Bus station in Norfolk, England

Norwich bus station
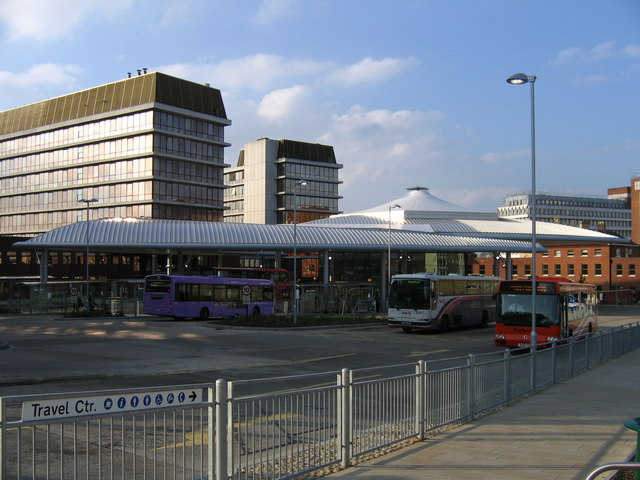
- The bus station in 2006

General information
- Location: Surrey Street, Norwich, Norfolk; England
- Coordinates: 52.6243°N 1.2929°E
- Operator: First Bus East of England; Konectbus
- Bus stands: 14
- Bus operators: First Bus East of England, Konectbus, National Express, Sanders Coaches, Simonds, City Sightseeing Norwich, Norse and Neaves
- Connections: Norwich railway station (approx. 1 mile)

History
- Opened: 2005
Location

Norwich bus station is sited off Surrey Street and Queen's Road in Norwich, England. It is served by several bus operators, including First Bus East of England, Konectbus, National Express and Sanders Coaches.

== History ==
The land between Surrey Street and Bull Lane was acquired in April 1934 by the Eastern Counties Omnibus Company. The huge garage and station were designed by architect H J Starkey and it was opened in 1936 by the Lord Mayor Walter Riley. The garage had the biggest unsupported roof span in the country, with no pillars or supports in the 52,000 square feet (4,800 m^{2}) of floor space. The garage structure was said to have weighed 220 tonnes; 650,000 bricks and 9 miles (14 km) of electric cable went into its construction.

The Norwich PT Major transportation project identified the need for a new bus station as the catalyst for the regeneration of an important social and commercial area of Norwich which was previously neglected. Funding was awarded in November 2002 and planning consent was granted in December 2003. Demolition and construction commenced in February 2004; partial opening of the through road for the Park & Ride service was achieved April 2005.

The new bus station opened on 30 August 2005, at a cost of £5 million and two months later than planned. With its distinctive steel roof, it won the 2006 SCALA Civic Building of the Year Award.

The roof has caused problems and, in February 2013, the bus station had to be closed for two weeks to allow contractors to replace much of the roof to fix leaks.

On average, the bus station sees 7,800 bus movements per week, with 200,000 passengers boarding; the information centre helps 21,000 people per week.

== Facilities ==
There is an information desk with general information on local buses and national coach services, a waiting area, public toilets and a café.

== Routes ==
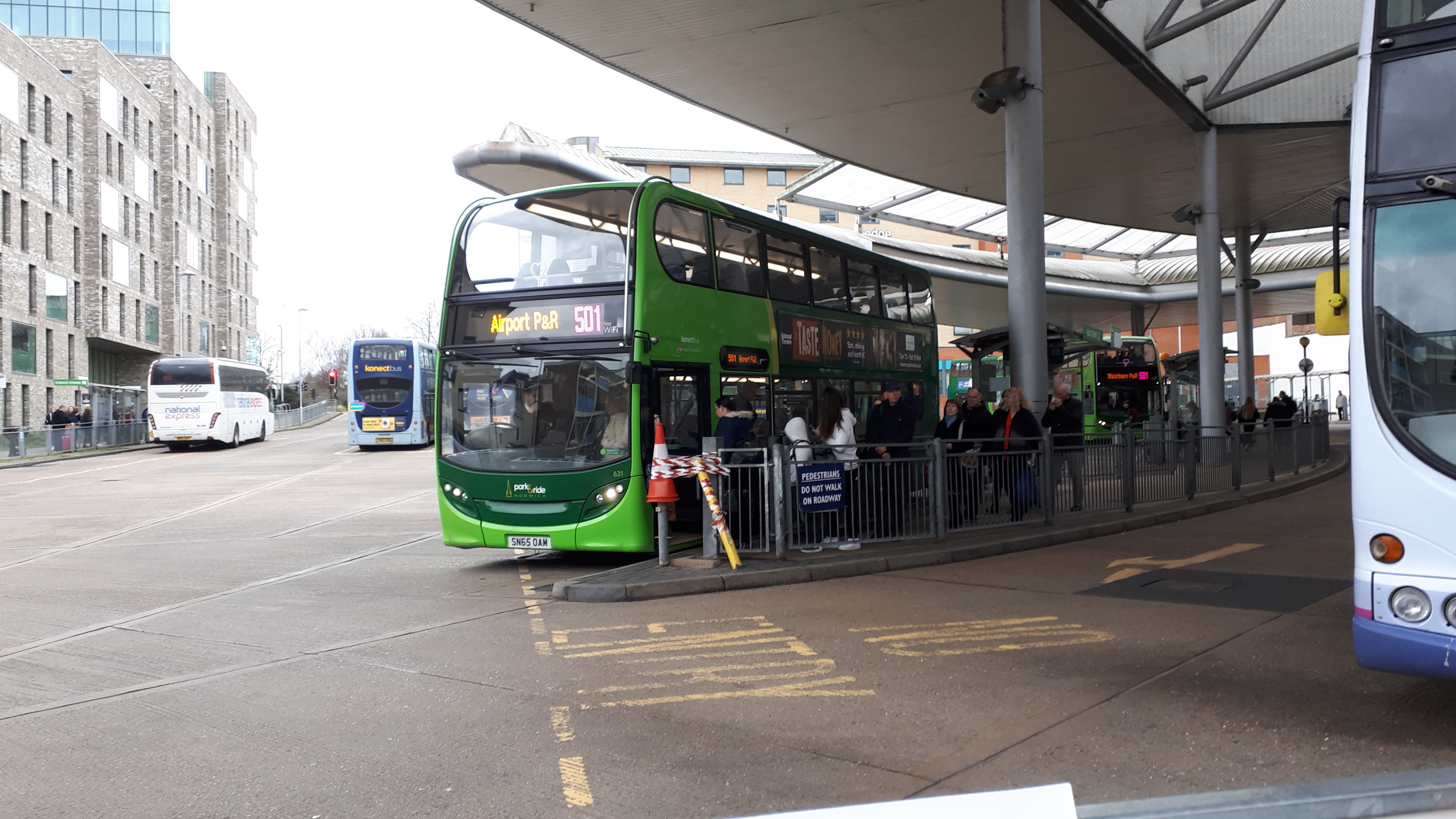
An Alexander Dennis Enviro400 bus operating on route 501

Most local bus operations in Norwich depart from either Castle Meadow, near Norwich Castle, St. Stephen's Street or from Theatre Street, near Norwich's Theatre Royal. The bus station is reserved for long-distance express services, coach services or Norwich Park and Ride services, with a few local services operating out of the terminus.

Most notable routes which operate from the bus station, include:

- X1 Coastlink: First Eastern Counties operates this flagship service to Great Yarmouth and Lowestoft
- X2 Coastlink: First Eastern Counties runs this service to Lowestoft, via the A146 road, calling at Loddon and Beccles
- Excel (Buses display “XL”): A,B and C services operate to Peterborough, via Dereham, Wisbech and King's Lynn; D runs to Dereham
- 8: Konectbus's KonectExpress, operates to Dereham and Toftwood
