= Norwich Park and Ride =

Park and ride bus service

Norwich Park & Ride
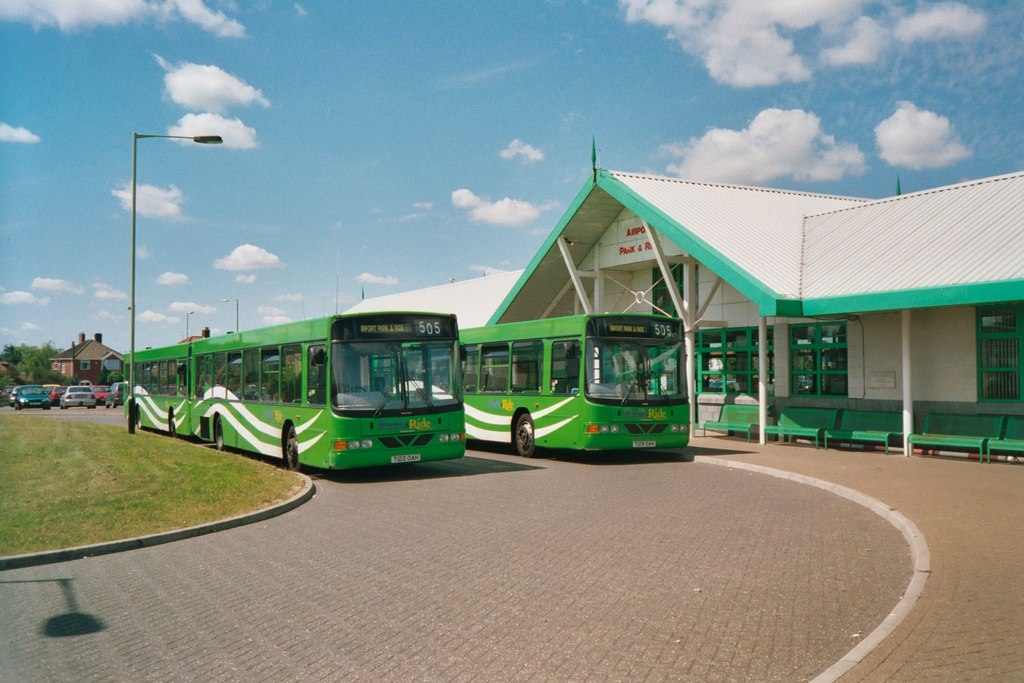
- First Eastern Counties Wright Axcess-Floline bodied Scania L94UBs at Norwich Airport in July 2002
- Parent: Norfolk County Council
- Founded: 1990s
- Locale: Norwich
- Service type: Park & ride
- Routes: 6
- Destinations: Hethersett, Norwich, Norwich Airport, University of East Anglia
- Hubs: Norwich bus station
- Fleet: Alexander Dennis Enviro400 MMC; Wright StreetDeck Electroliner
- Operator: First Eastern Counties; Simonds Coach & Travel

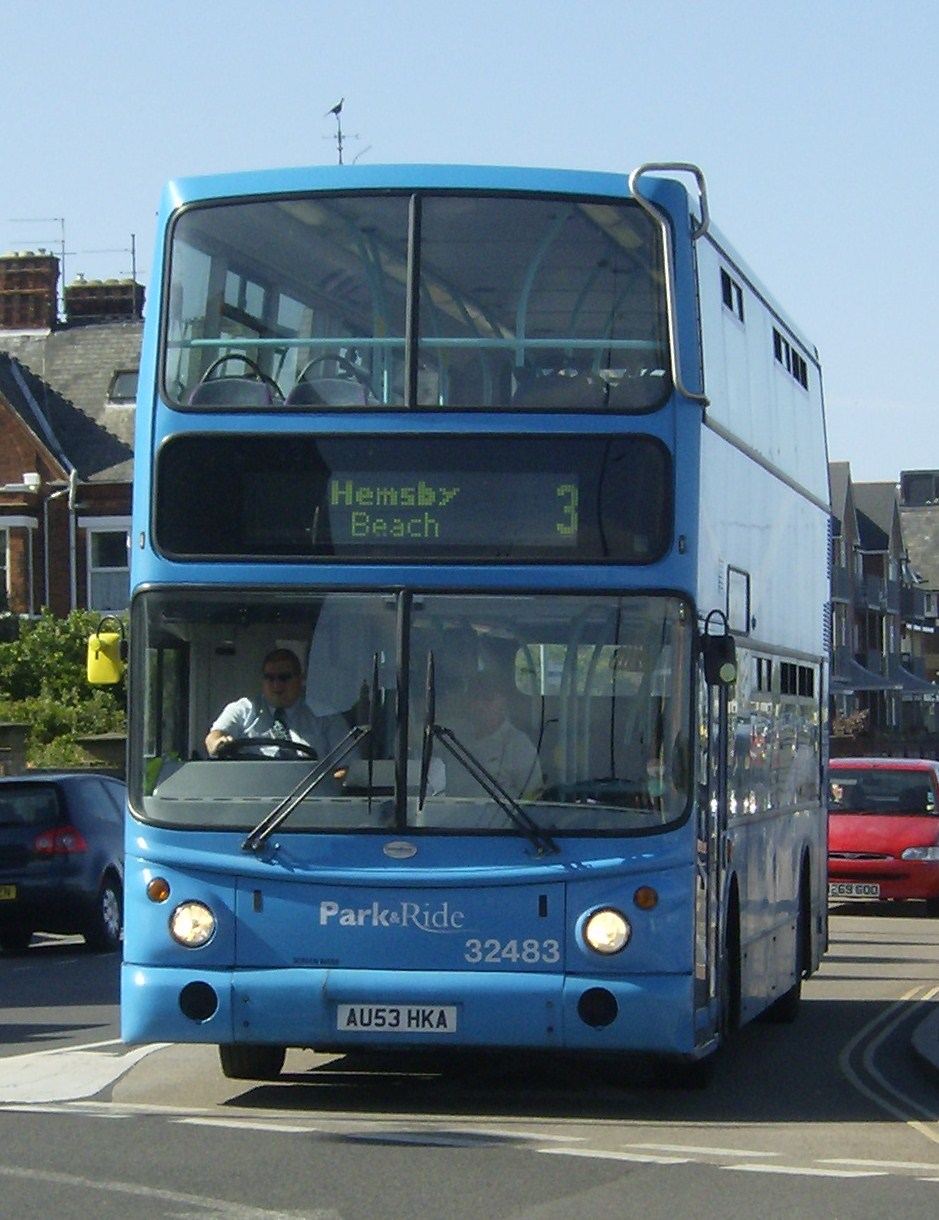
First Eastern Counties Alexander ALX400 bodied Volvo B7TL in June 2008

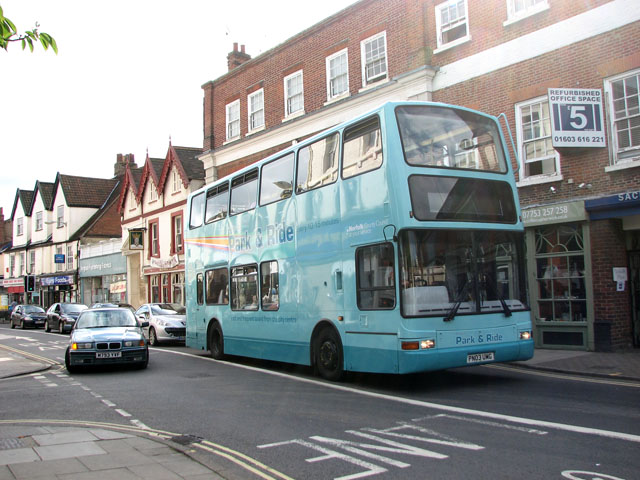
Norse Plaxton President bodied Dennis Trident 2 in September 2010

The Norwich Park and Ride is a park & ride bus service in the English city of Norwich, East Anglia. The first of the park and rides was opened in the early 1990s at Norwich Airport in Hellesdon, while the sixth and final site was opened in Thickthorn in 2005. With the addition of the final site, the Norwich Park & Ride became the largest park and ride services in the United Kingdom, and provided the scheme with over 5,000 permanent parking spaces – at the time the highest number for a park and ride scheme in the country. The scheme was awarded the British Parking Association Park and Ride award in 2004, and in the 2006/2007 financial year, 3.3 million people used the service, keeping 940,000 cars out of the city centre.

== Sites ==
=== Thickthorn Park & Ride ===
Thickthorn Park & Ride is located near Thickthorn services in Hethersett (NR9 3AU), on the junction of the A47 with the A11. The site first opened in 2005, making it the newest Park & Ride site in Norwich. It has 726 car parking spaces.

=== Harford Park & Ride ===
Harford Park & Ride is located on Ipswich Road, Norwich (NR4 6DY), and is accessed via an exit off the Harford Interchange where the A140 meets the A47.

The site has 1088 car parking spaces, including electric vehicle charging points, cycle parking and recycle facilities.

In 2015, First Eastern Counties began to operate service 600 which travelled between the site and Norfolk County Hall on weekday mornings and evenings. This service was taken over by Konectbus when the new park and ride contract began in September 2015.

=== Airport Park & Ride ===
Airport Park & Ride is located on Buck Courtney Crescent, next to the entrance to Norwich Airport. The site has 620 spaces and facilities for recycling and electric vehicle charging.

=== Costessey Park & Ride ===
Costessey Park & Ride is located next to the Royal Norfolk Showground in Costessey, Norwich. It has 1,100 spaces. From September 2015, it became the only site which has no service to the City Centre at all. Services instead run from the site to the Norfolk and Norwich University Hospital and the University of East Anglia only.

=== Postwick Park & Ride ===
Postwick Park & Ride is located on Yarmouth Road at the eastern junction between the A47 and the A1270 (NR13 5NP). It has 552 car parking spaces.

=== Sprowston Park & Ride ===
Sprowston Park & Ride is located north-east of the city at Wroxham Road. It has 792 spaces.

== Operations ==
=== 2005-2010 ===
Between 2005 and 2010, the sites were managed and operated by three companies:

- First Eastern Counties operated the Harford Park & Ride with blue livery TransBus ALX400 bodied Volvo B7TL double deckers and Sprowston with purple Wright Eclipse Urban bodied Volvo B7RLE single deckers
- Konectbus operated the Thickthorn Park & Ride with pink liveried Wright Eclipse Gemini bodied VDL DB250 double deckers and Costessey with green Optare Tempo single deckers
- Norse operated the Airport Park & Ride with yellow Irisbus Agora Line single deckers and Postwick with red Irisbus Agora Line single deckers

=== 2010-2015 ===
From 2010 until September 2015, the Harford, Thickthorn and Costessey sites are operated by Konectbus, and Sprowston, Postwick and Airport by Norse.

Konectbus purchased a fleet of Alexander Dennis Enviro400 double deckers painted in a blue livery to operate the Harford contract. Pink livery Wright Eclipse Gemini double deckers operate the Thickthorn service, while ex London General articulated Mercedes-Benz Citaro buses run between the Costessey site, the University of East Anglia and the city centre.

Norse operated a fleet of Plaxton President bodied double deckers to operate all their services, with Airport having a light blue livery and Postwick and Sprowston sites being merged, operating via the city centre and Norfolk County Hall.

=== 2015-2020 ===
On 7 September 2015, Konectbus commenced a contract to operate all six park & ride service for a five-year period. A fleet of 18 Alexander Dennis Enviro400s painted in a new green livery were purchased.

=== 2020-2024 ===
In 2020, Konectbus renewed the contract to continue running all routes on the park and ride. In March of that same year all park and ride sites were closed due to the COVID-19 pandemic. All sites were reopened in 2022, except the Postwick site, which was not reopened until September 2023.

In 2022, First Eastern Counties took over the contract for the Costessey service, purchasing a fleet of Alexander Dennis Enviro400 MMC double deckers for the route.

In early 2024, it was announced that the Postwick site was being planned for closure at it had failed to recover passenger numbers to pre-COVID levels. However, the site will now continue to operate following alterations made to the 2025-2030 contract.

=== 2025-present ===
On 2nd October 2024, it was announced that Konectbus would not have their contract renewed for the 2025-2030 period, ending almost 20 years of Norwich park and ride services by the operator with First bus East of England and Simonds Coach & Travel taking over.

Commencing April 2025, the Thickthorn, Airport, Sprowston and Costessey services will be operated by First Bus East of England, with the Postwick and Harford sites now being operated by Simonds Coach & Travel.

== Current routes ==
- Service PR1 (First bus East of England)
  - Airport Park & Ride
  - City Centre
  - Thickthorn
- Service PR2 (Simonds)
  - Harford Park and Ride
  - City Centre
  - City College
- Service PR3 (Simonds)
  - Postwick Park & Ride
  - City Centre
  - City College
- Service 510(First bus East of England)
  - Costessey Park & Ride
  - N&N Hospital
- Service 511 (First bus East of England)
  - Costessey Park & Ride
  - UEA
- Service 11/12 (First bus East of England)
  - Sprowston Park and Ride
  - City Centre
  - N&NU Hospital

== Proposed development ==
=== Expansion of Postwick site ===
It is proposed to add 500 places to the Postwick site as part of the Postwick Hub development which is associated with the Norwich Northern Distributor Road development.

== Incidents ==
In May 2011, a Norse double decker operating on the Postwick park and ride service, caught fire on the A47. The bus was completely destroyed by flames after suffering an engine failure, however passengers were evacuated with no injuries by the driver.

In January 2013, passengers on board an Airport Park and Ride bus operated by Norse were evacuated while at the Airport Park and Ride site after the double decker bus caught fire. Firefighters were able to extinguish the fire within ten minutes of it breaking out.
