= Excel (bus route) =

Bus route in east England

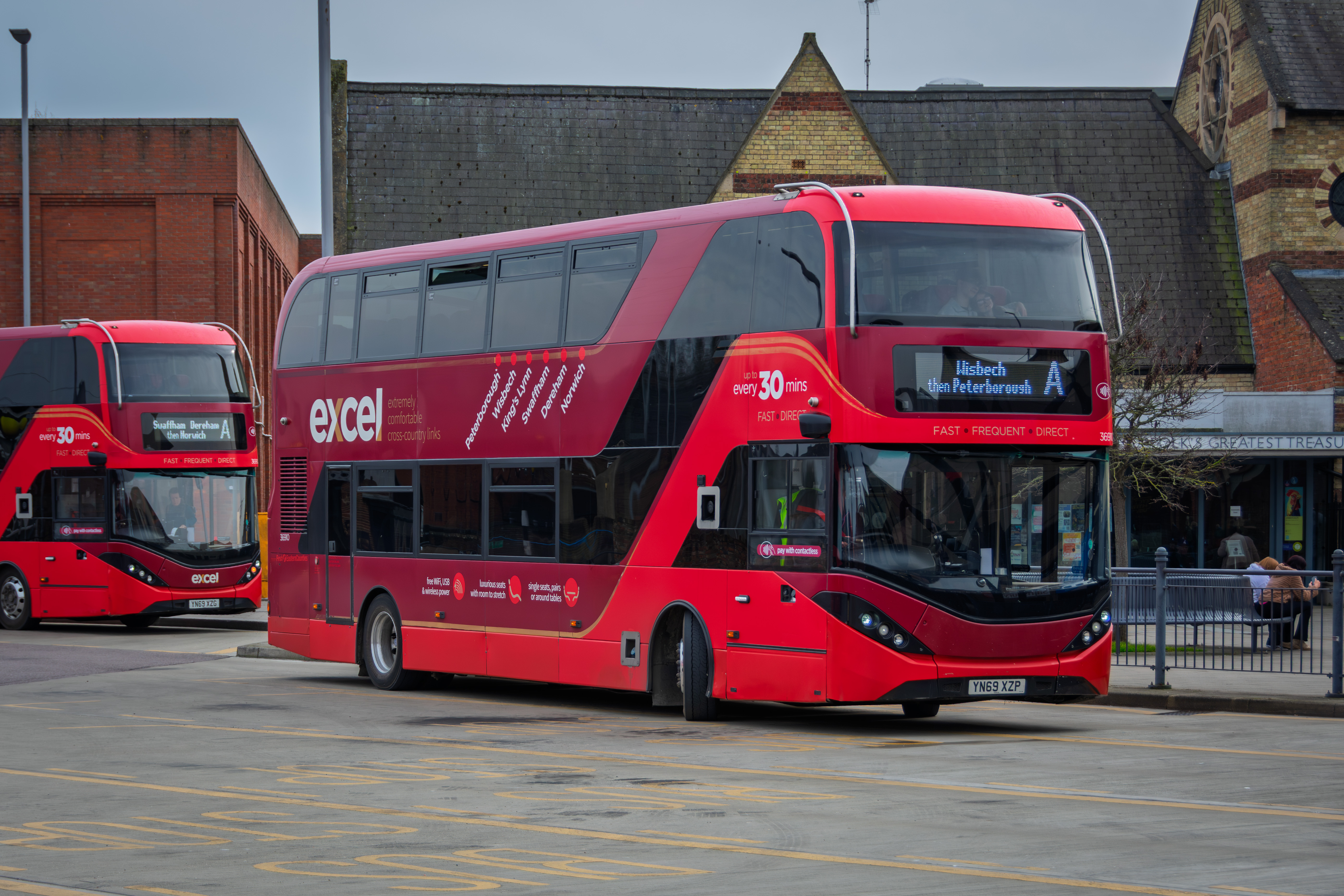
- An Enviro400 City bodied Scania N250UD with the excel branding in King's Lynn in March 2026

Overview
- Operator: First Eastern Counties
- Vehicle: Scania N250UD/Alexander Dennis Enviro400 City

Route
- Start: Norwich bus station
- Via: Dereham; Swaffham; King's Lynn; Wisbech
- End: Peterborough bus station
- Length: 80 miles (130 km)

Excel is the brand name given to a number of bus services operated by First Norfolk & Suffolk, covering 80 miles (130 km) between Norwich bus station in Norfolk and Peterborough railway station in Cambridgeshire, England. Prior to February 2018, the route also extended from Norwich to Lowestoft in Suffolk via Great Yarmouth; this section of the route has since been replaced by Coastlink branded services X1 and X2. As of June 2021, the Excel route itself operates between Peterborough, King's Lynn and Norwich, with variations A, B, C and D providing different levels of service to intermediate villages.

In the year up to April 2009, the route saw a 15% increase in passenger numbers compared to the previous year. In 2013, the service received brand new buses in the form of high-specification Alexander Dennis Enviro400 double-deckers.

== Route and Frequency ==
The route is around 80 miles in length, mostly following the A47 road and only stopping at major interchange points in urban areas. In total, from Norwich to Peterborough the journey time is around 3 hours and 25 minutes.

Since July 2014, the route has been made up of two sections. Before this date, buses would run the entirety of the route, but since July 2014 services operate between Peterborough and Norwich (as excel) and Norwich and Lowestoft (X1) separately, with all services in both directions terminating at Norwich Bus Station. Passengers travelling further have to change. At that time, the "splitting" of the route was a temporary measure introduced in order to ease delays while major long term roadworks were carried out on the A47 at Postwick, east of Norwich. From February 2018, the split became a permanent measure for operational reasons.

There is a different frequency on each section of the route. In general, there is a 20-minute frequency from Monday to Saturday on the X1 between Norwich and Lowestoft and a half-hourly frequency from Monday to Saturday on the excel between Norwich and Peterborough.

=== Vehicles ===
The route was mostly operated by high-specification double-decker Alexander Dennis Enviro400 buses, which were introduced in October 2013 featuring air conditioning, free WiFi and leather seats. The older Wright Eclipse Gemini-bodied Volvo B9TL vehicles which previously operated the main route were mostly transferred to the X2, X11, X21, X22 and other related services.

In February 2020, 19 new Alexander Dennis Enviro400 City bodied Scania N250UD buses were introduced on the core excel route (Norwich - Peterborough). The former Alexander Dennis Enviro400 buses were at this point rebranded for the "Coastlink" X1, X11, X2 and X22 from Great Yarmouth to Lowestoft, with the Wright Eclipse Geminis mostly moving to local work out of Great Yarmouth and Lowestoft depots under the "Coastal Clipper" and "Coastal Reds" brands although some were also "Coastlink" branded and remain on their former routes.

== Media ==
An unofficial blog, The X1 Blog, regularly reports on the latest workings of the service.

== Accidents and incidents ==
In May 2009, an X1 bus travelling towards Peterborough was involved in a fatal accident in Thorney. The driver took avoiding action after a car drove into its path, causing the bus to veer off the road.

On 23 February 2017, an X1 bus crashed into a roadside ditch and overturned near Wisbech as a result of high winds, gusting up to 80mph in the area around the time of the crash, caused by Storm Doris. Eleven people were injured. A similar incident almost occurred around the same time on the Acle Straight between Great Yarmouth and Norwich, resulting in the bus having to be evacuated, and services were subsequently suspended for the day.

On 26 June 2018, an Excel bus was involved in a collision with a lorry on the A47 in Guyhirn. The bus driver and a passenger were killed, and fourteen others were injured.
