= Lynx (bus company) =

Bus operator in King's Lynn, England

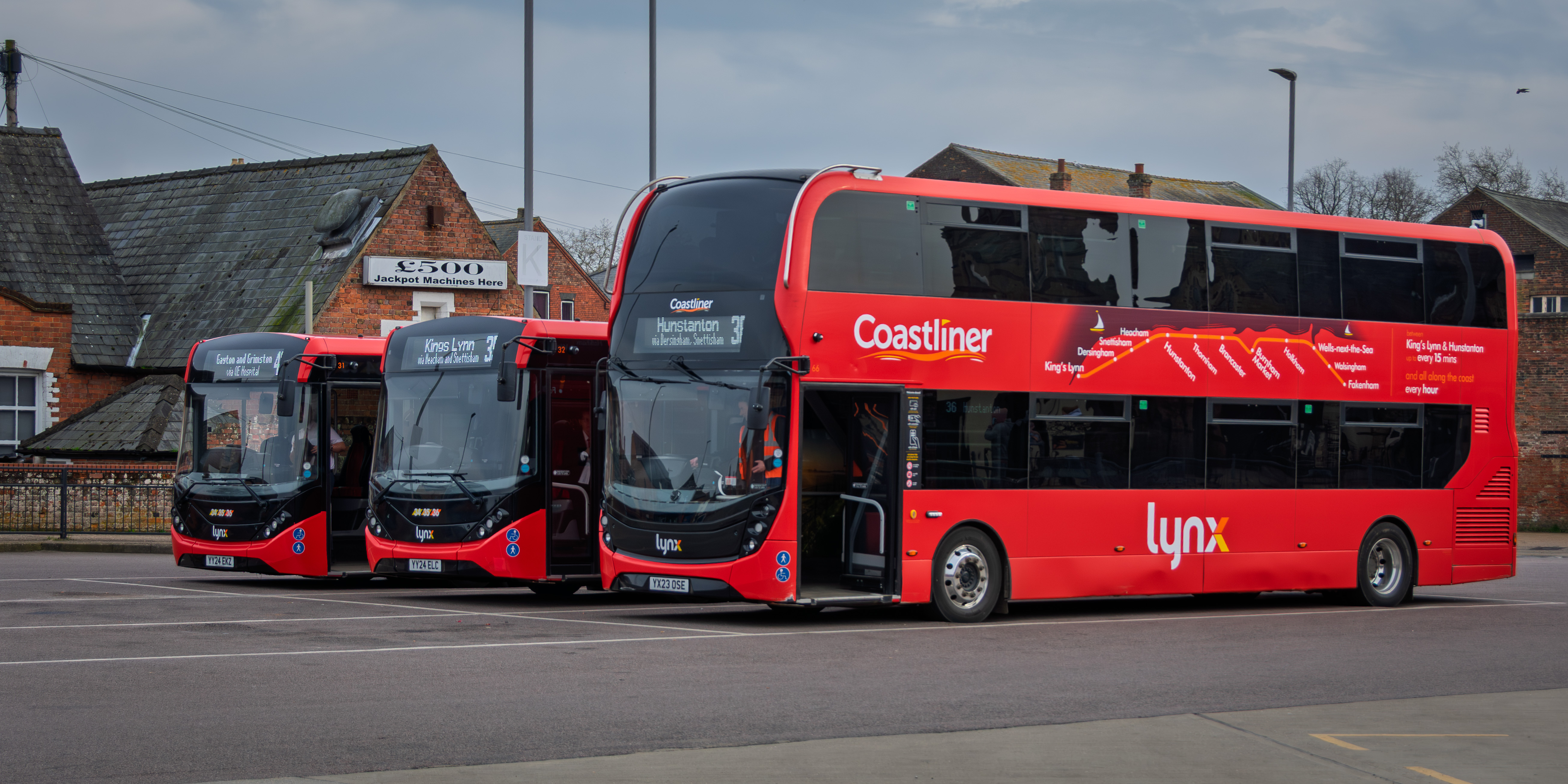
- An Enviro400 MMC and two Enviro200 MMCs of Lynx at King's Lynn bus station in March 2026
- Founded: 6 January 2015
- Headquarters: King's Lynn
- Locale: North West Norfolk
- Service area: Norfolk; Cambridgeshire
- Service type: Bus services
- Alliance: Coasthopper shared with Sanders Coaches
- Routes: 25 (June 2026)
- Hubs: King's Lynn
- Fleet: 37 (June 2026)
- Website: www.lynxbus.co.uk

Lynx is a bus company based in King's Lynn and operating services across west and north Norfolk and eastern Cambridgeshire.

As of early 2025, destinations include Hunstanton, Fakenham, Downham Market, Southery, Gayton, Grimston, Marham, Wisbech, Bircham Newton, Sedgeford, Sandringham & Wells-next-the-Sea

== History ==
Lynx was founded by Stephen Challis and Andrew Warnes in 2013. The pair (along with Julian Patterson) had previously established Konectbus in 1999 before selling it to the Go-Ahead Group in March 2010. Having considered construction and engineering, the idea of a new bus operation formally began in spring 2014. Julian Patterson would come aboard later that year upon leaving Go-Ahead.

Operations commenced on 6 January 2015, with a school contract between Southery and Downham Market Academy. On 26 January 2015, their first public bus service began, operating hourly between King's Lynn to Hunstanton.

Lynx expanded its network of routes with the takeover three Council-subsidised bus services from Stagecoach in Norfolk in September 2017, followed by a further eight former Stagecoach routes from 29 April 2018, after Stagecoach closed their King's Lynn depot. Among the services taken on following Stagecoach's withdrawal from the area was the western half of the popular and well established Coasthopper service between King's Lynn and Cromer. Lynx took over operation of the King's Lynn to Wells-next-the-Sea section of this route, rebranded it as Coastliner 36 and extended the service inland from Wells to Fakenham. A further three services were taken over from Stagecoach in September 2018.

During 2019, Lynx funded a refurbishment/renewing of the Queen Elizabeth Hospital, King's Lynn bus shelters, and a next bus information screen was provided by Norfolk County Council.

A brand new, thoroughly redesigned website (powered by the 'BusHub Mobility Platform') launched in December 2019, including a live bus tracker, fare calculator and journey planner, with an iOS & Android app following shortly afterwards in January 2020

== Fleet ==
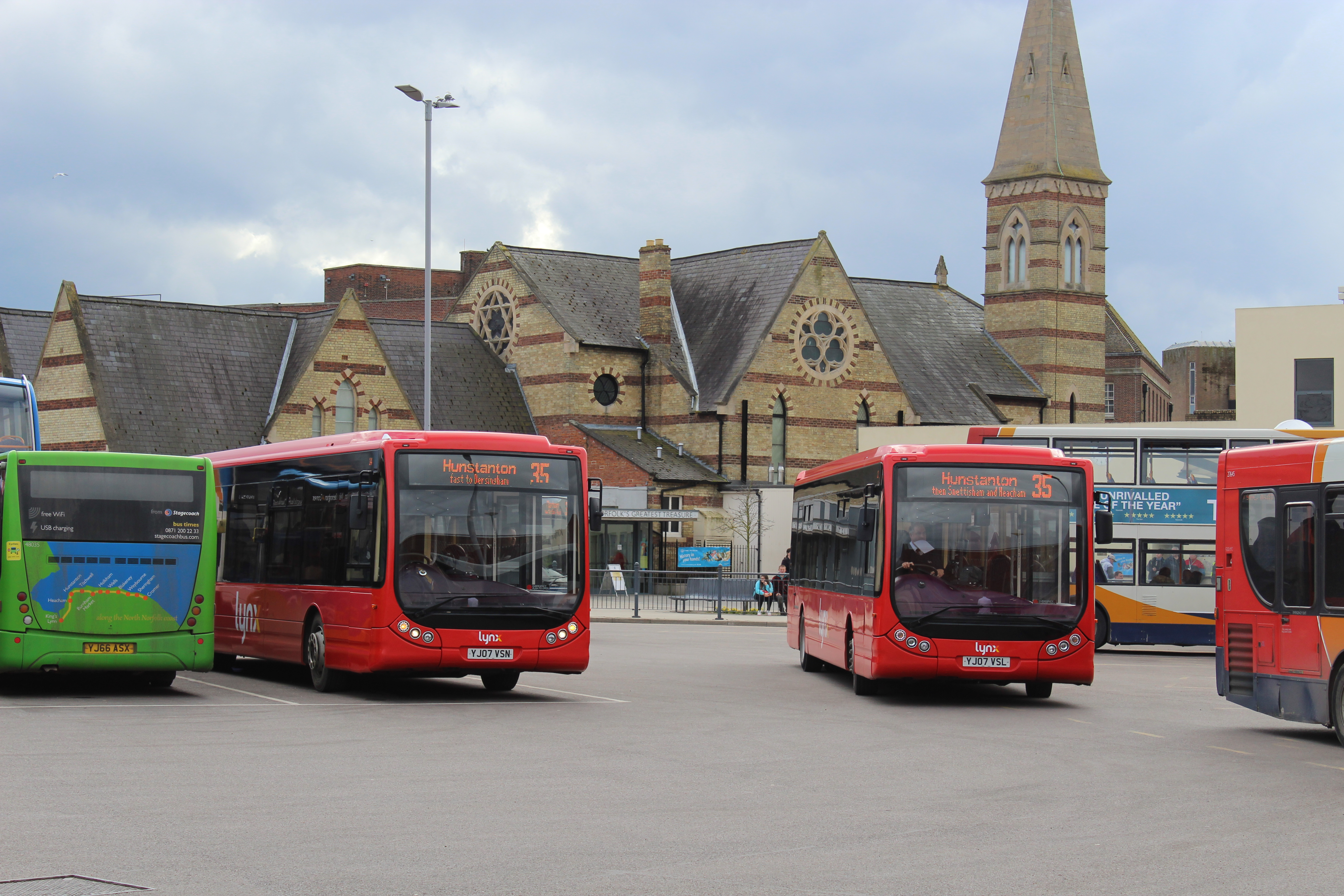
Two Lynx Tempos at Lynn Bus Station in 2018.

Saloon view of fully refurbished former Yellow Buses bespoke Optare Tempo, featuring Lynx's own moquette design

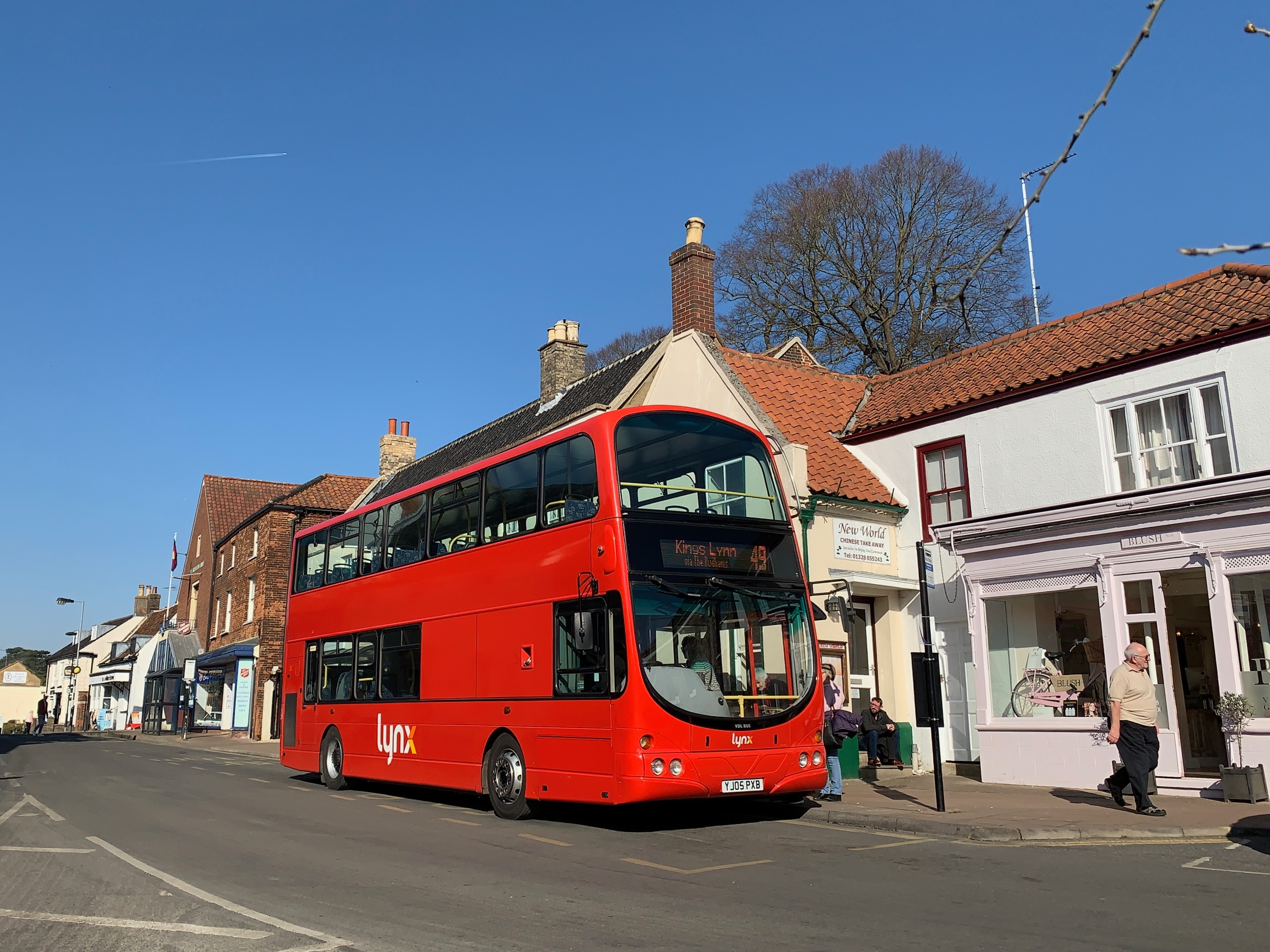
Wright Pulsar Gemini bodied VDL DB250 in Fakenham in February 2019

Lynx commenced operations with a fleet of four Optare Tempos, including an experimental prototype purchased directly from Optare. It standardised on the type and by December 2018 it was operating the largest fleet of Tempos in the United Kingdom with 27. Buses are painted in Volkswagen Mars Red.

Since September 2016, Lynx has also operated double-deckers including Optare Spectra and Wright Pulsar Gemini bodied DAF DB250LFs, Alexander-Dennis Enviro 400 and Enviro 400MMCs . Two new, bespoke Enviro400 MMCs arrived in spring 2021 for added capacity on the Coastliner route. Another 5 have been delivered, with all of them having next stop displays and announcements, USB-A and 2 tables upstairs (with wireless charging implanted into them), these buses having amazing designs (6 are liveried for the Coastliner 36 and 1 for the 34/35/36 which does make an appearance on the Coastliner sometimes)

After the successful refurbishment of an ex-Yellow Buses Optare Tempo (not limited to new flooring, moquette, renewed interior LED uplighting and alloy wheels), Lynx further undertook refurbishment of 2 Alexander Dennis Enviro400s to replace ageing, unconventional konectbus original Wright Pulsar Gemini bodied DAF DB250LFs.

Lynx has started slowly phasing out older euro III Optare Tempos by replacing them with brand new euro VI Alexander Dennis Enviro200 MMC's (they have 7 as of Apr 26) for the 34/35/36 which go to Hunstanton from King's Lynn and back; and for the Fairstead 42 King's Lynn town route. these new buses feature next stop display and announcements, they also have USB-A sockets for the passenger's convenience. These new buses have stop-start technology making them cleaner for the environment.

In 2026, Lynx acquired eight second-hand Mercedes-Benz Citaros from Bus Vannin.

Lynx owned a Leyland National, which was operated as a heritage bus in a semi-preserved state, painted in Lynx's standard red livery.

Lynx has 38 buses in service as of May 2026.
