= SaxonAir =

British airline

SaxonAir Charter Limited
| IATA | ICAO | Call sign |
|---|---|---|
| - | SXN | SAXONAIR |
- Founded: 5 April 2007
- AOC #: GB2327
- Hubs: Norwich Airport; Luton Airport; Stansted Airport
- Fleet size: 9
- Parent company: Klyne Aviation
- Headquarters: Norwich, United Kingdom
- Website: http://www.saxonair.com

SaxonAir Charter Limited is a private charter airline based at Norwich Airport that operates in the United Kingdom and Western Europe.

== History ==
In 2007, Christopher Mace and James Palmer founded SaxonAir from an office in the back of a hangar at Norwich Airport. It operated an aircraft and helicopter for then chairman Graeme Kalbraier's businesses and made them available for charter.

Roger Klyne purchased the business in 2009. It took over operation of aircraft he owned. The airline's passengers included Meat Loaf and Debbie Harry.

In Spring 2010, SaxonAir opened a £6m Business Aviation Centre at Norwich Airport and the next year, announced that it had based a Citation Mustang at Thessaloniki Airport in Greece.

== Fleet ==
| Aircraft | Seats | Number |
|---|---|---|
| Hawker 750 | 8+1 | 1 |
| Hawker 900XP | 8+1 | 1 |
| Cessna Citation Mustang | 4 | 1 |
| Citation 525 CJ2 | 6 | 1 |
| Hawker 400XP | 7+1 | 1 |
| Gulfstream G550 | 16 | 1 |
| Embraer Legacy 500 | 9+1 | 1 |
| Phenom 300 | 8+1 | 1 |
| Eurocopter EC120 | 4 | 1 |
| Agusta A109 | 7 | 1 |
