= Stagecoach in Norfolk =

Former bus operator

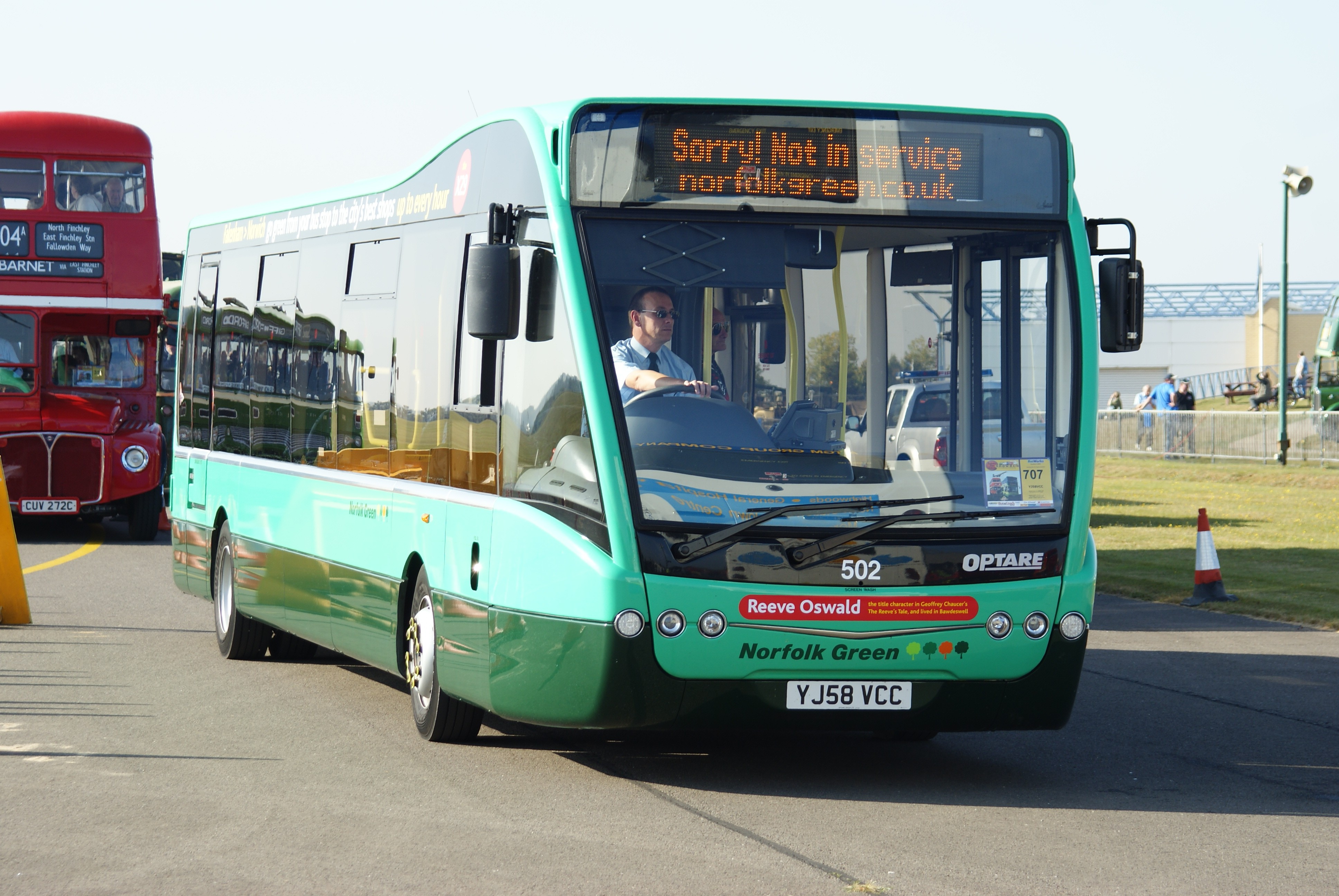
- Optare Versa in September 2009
- Parent: Stagecoach
- Founded: 1996
- Defunct: April 2018
- Headquarters: King's Lynn
- Service area: Norfolk, Cambridgeshire, Lincolnshire
- Service type: Bus services
- Hubs: King's Lynn, Wisbech, Fakenham, Norwich & Cromer
- Chief executive: Gary Nolan
- Website: www.norfolkgreen.co.uk

Stagecoach in Norfolk (formerly Norfolk Green) was a bus operator based in King's Lynn in Norfolk, England. It operated public bus services in the counties of Norfolk, Cambridgeshire and Lincolnshire as well as numerous school and college services. It was a subsidiary of Stagecoach.

In April 2018, Stagecoach ceased operations in Norfolk. Services were taken over by First Norfolk & Suffolk, Lynx, Sanders Coaches, Stagecoach in Peterborough (the Interconnect 505) and West Norfolk Community Transport.

== History ==
Former Norfolk Green logo

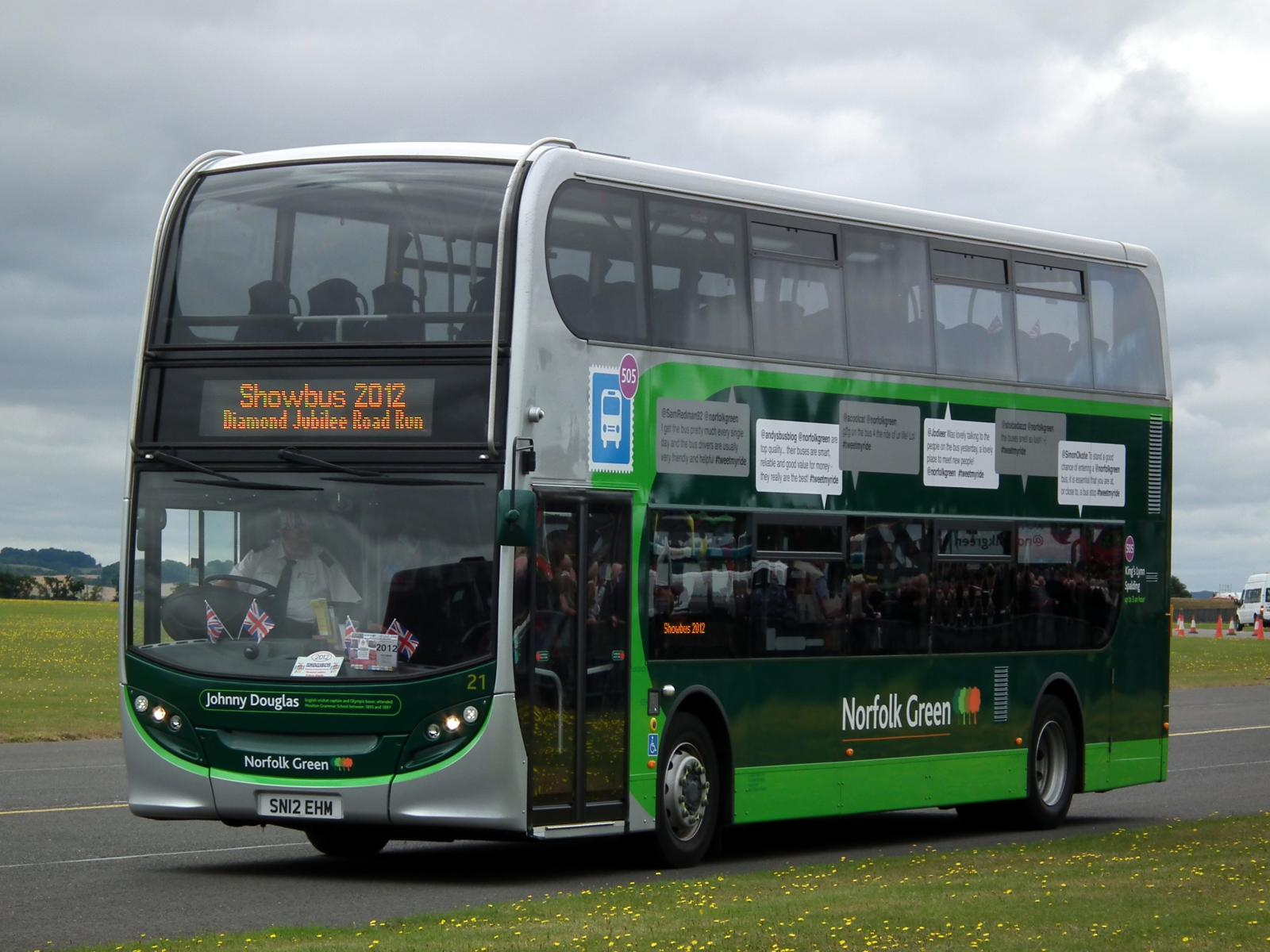
Alexander Dennis Enviro400 in September 2012

Norfolk Green was formed in 1996 with a fleet of four buses. In 1999 the Saham Toney depot was sold to Konectbus with four coaches.

In April 2011, Norfolk Green purchased the King's Lynn based services of First East England.

On 17 December 2013, Norfolk Green was sold to Stagecoach following the retirement of Ben Colson after ill health. Unusually, Stagecoach did not immediately apply its corporate brand, but retained the Norfolk Green trading name and livery, although the fleet received Stagecoach fleet numbers. All buses were rebranded between 2015 and late 2017.

In January 2018, Stagecoach announced it was reviewing its operations in Norfolk in response to the challenging economic environment, blaming a combination of rising operating costs and pressure on public sector budgets. The company said it met with trade union representatives to minimise the impact on staff and launched a consultation with employees over the potential closure of its King's Lynn depot. The company hoped to relocate the majority of its staff with other operators or elsewhere within the Stagecoach East area, which includes Bedford, Cambridge, Huntingdon and Peterborough.

== Routes ==
Routes operated by Stagecoach Norfolk included the very popular Coasthopper services between King's Lynn and Cromer, the Interconnect 505 between King's Lynn and Spalding, a town service network in King's Lynn, a city service in Ely and many rural and interurban bus services across Norfolk, Cambridgeshire and Lincolnshire.

== Fleet ==
As at July 2013, the fleet consisted of 74 buses. Fleet livery is two tone green. Twelve Optare Solo Slimlines wear a dark blue, yellow and green livery for the Coasthopper group of services. A large proportion of buses are also named after local characters and personalities.

Upon Stagecoach's purchase of Norfolk Green, in the summer of 2016 Stagecoach Norfolk went onto replace the fleet of Coasthopper Optare Solo's with Alexander Dennis Enviro200s. In addition, and later on, they purchased brand new Optare Solos. These new buses feature a new updated Coasthopper 'Flying Kite' livery, free Wi-Fi, USB charging points and leather seating.
