= Simonds Coach & Travel =

Bus and coach operator in Diss, Norfolk, England

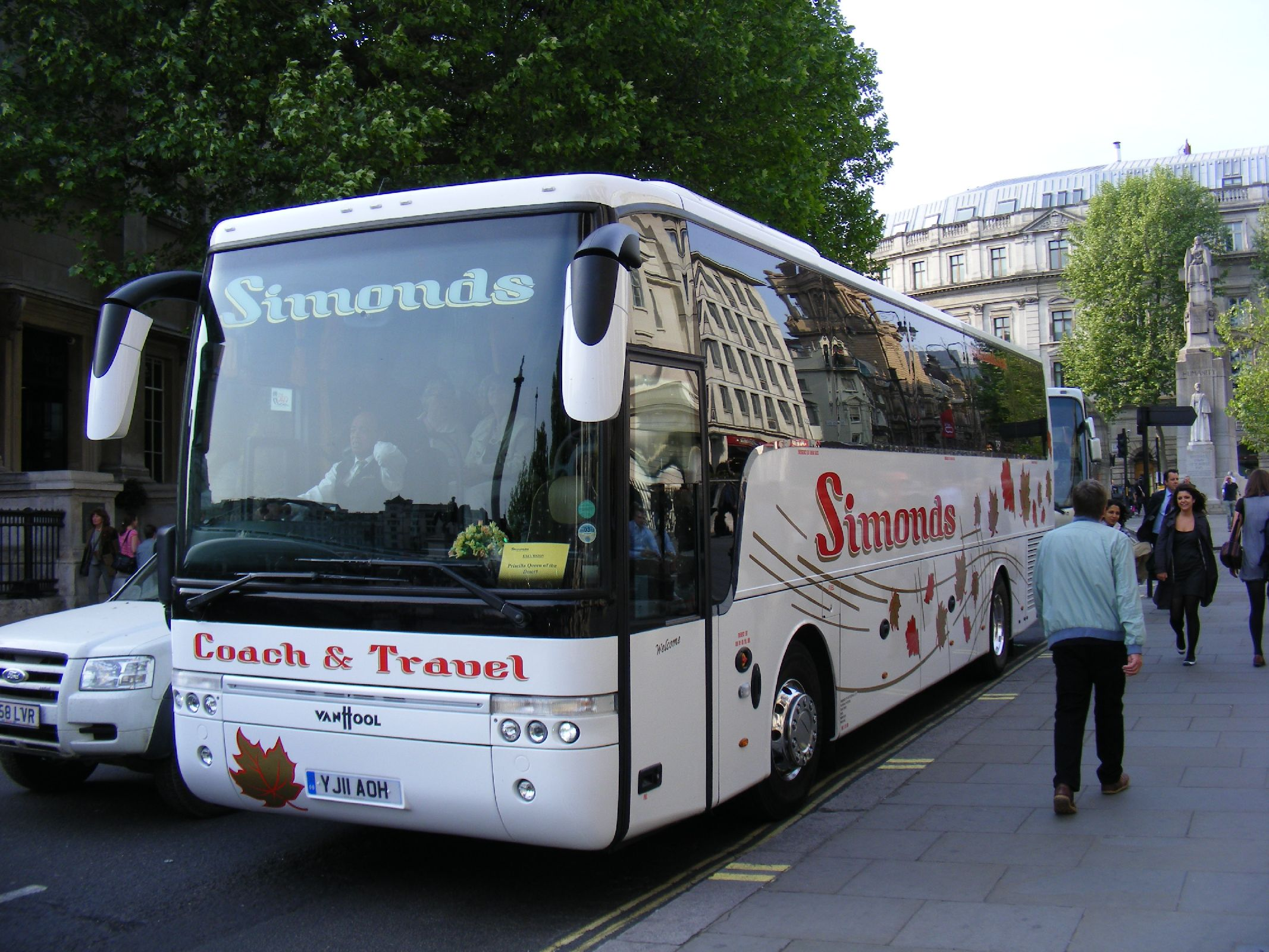
A Simonds Van Hool T9 coach in London in May 2011

Simonds is a bus operator based in Diss, Norfolk, England. It is a subsidiary of the Transport Made Simple Group.

== History ==
The firm started in 1927 as a car repair workshop.

In 2014, the firm had a fleet of 47 vehicles, including 17 buses. In 2015, the firm had just under 100 employees.

During the COVID-19 pandemic, the company received grants from the UK government to allow it to continue operating bus services.

In May 2024, Simonds was acquired by the Transport Made Simple Group. Following the acquisition, Simonds was announced to be kept separate from the main Central Connect bus operations, and the other coach operations of the Group (Flagfinders).
