= Toftwood =

Coordinates: 52.663°N 0.938°E

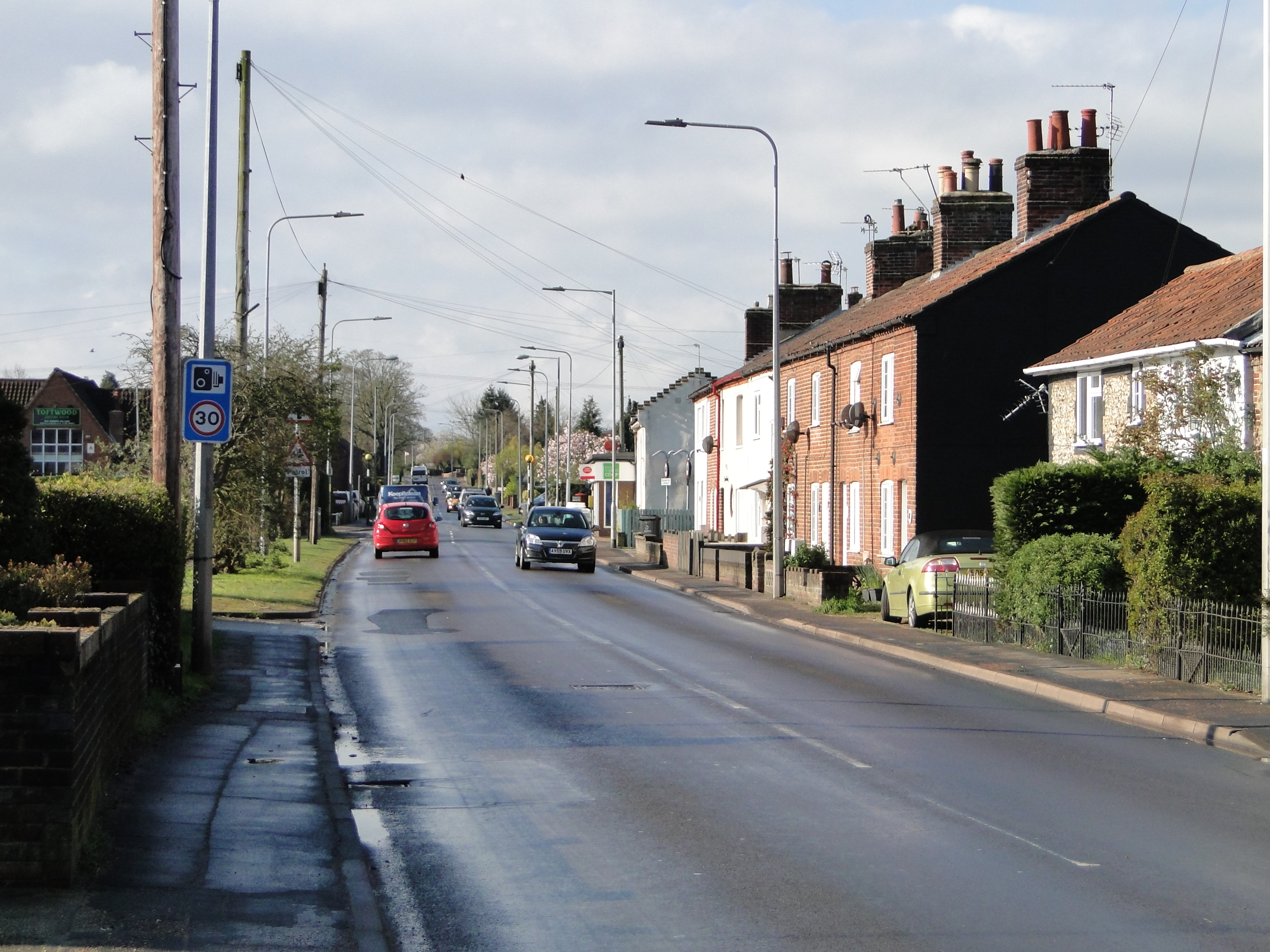
Shipdham Road (A1075), Toftwood

Toftwood is a southern suburb of the town of Dereham in the county of Norfolk, England.
