= First Bus East of England =

Bus operator in Norfolk and Suffolk, England

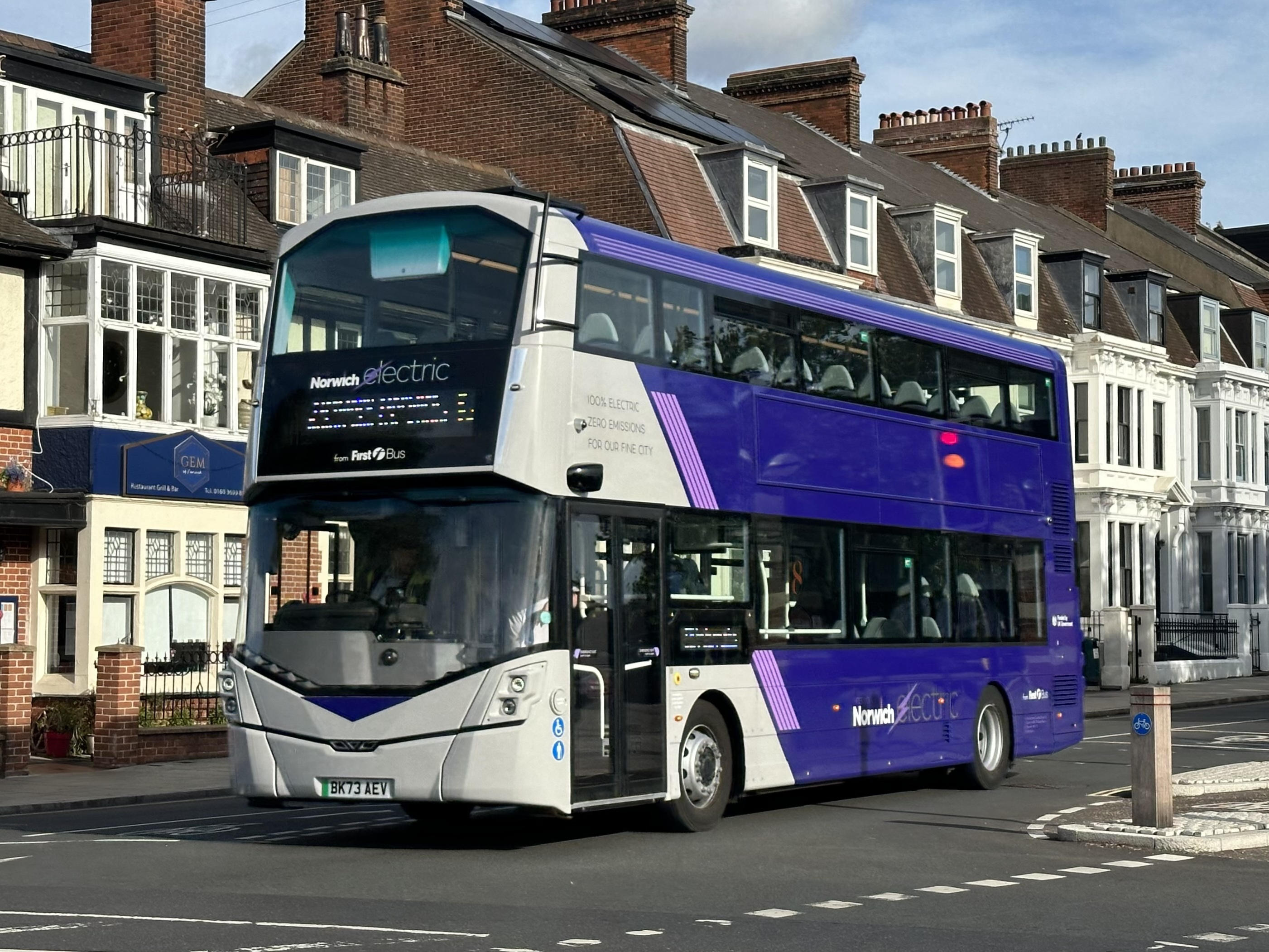
- A Wright StreetDeck Electroliner on Thorpe Road in Norwich, October 2023
- Parent: FirstGroup
- Founded: July 1931
- Headquarters: Norwich
- Locale: East Anglia
- Service area: Norfolk; Suffolk
- Service type: Bus services
- Routes: 68
- Depots: 5
- Fleet: 342 (January 2024)
- Operator: Network Norwich, Norwich park & ride
- Website: Official website

First Bus East of England (formerly known as First Eastern Counties) is a bus operator that provides services in Norfolk and Suffolk in eastern England; it is a subsidiary of FirstGroup. It has five depots in operating areas spread out across East Anglia: Norwich, Ipswich, Great Yarmouth, Lowestoft and King's Lynn.

== History ==
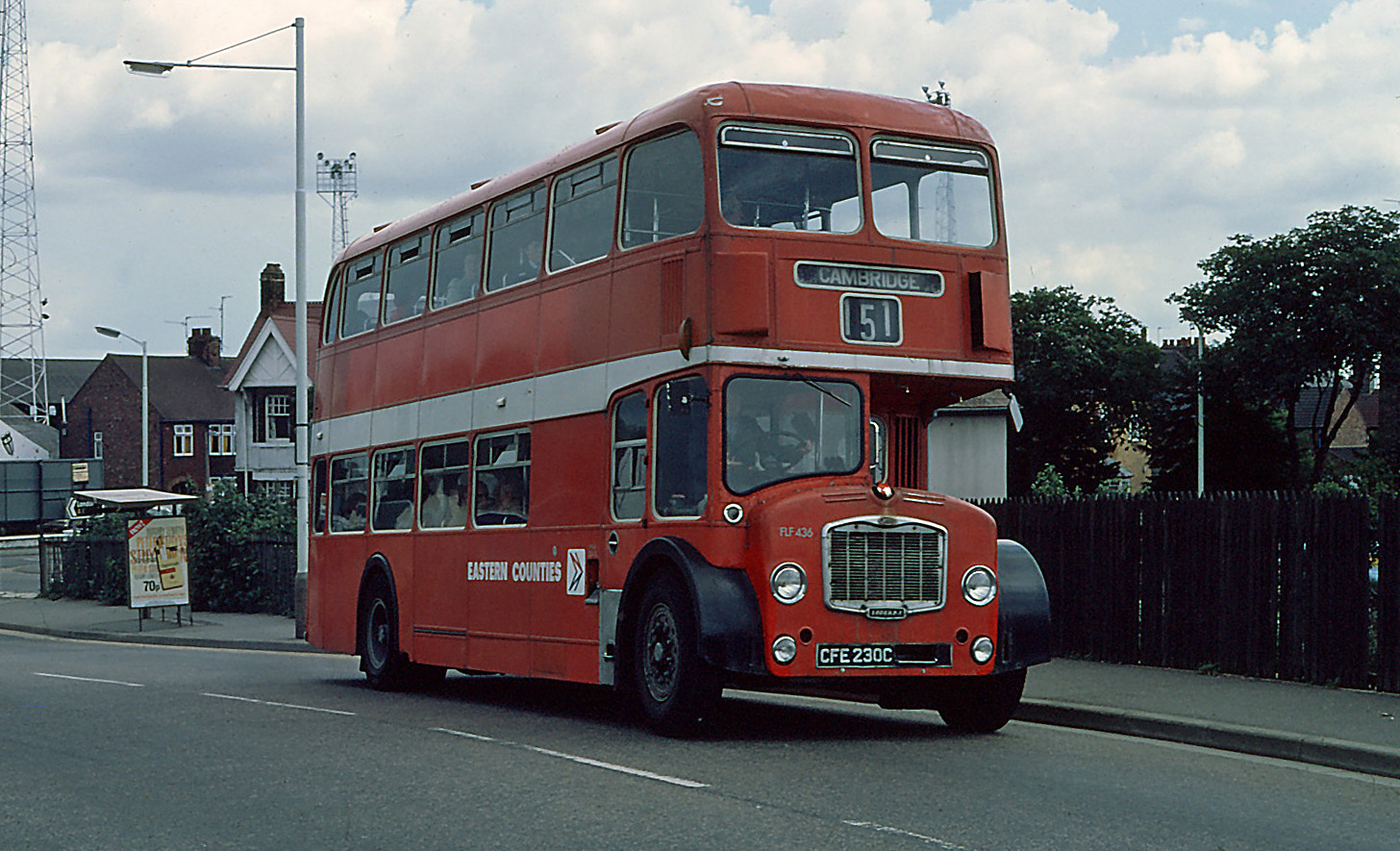
NBC Eastern Counties Bristol Lodekka in Peterborough in July 1980

In July 1931, the Eastern Counties Omnibus Company was formed with a fleet of 534 buses out of the merger of four existing bus companies in East Anglia: Eastern Counties Road Car Company of Ipswich, Ortona Motor Company of Cambridge and Peterborough Electric Traction Company, which were all owned by Tilling & British Automobile Traction and United Automobile Services' East Anglia services.

Upon completion of the merger, the major shareholders of Eastern Counties were United Automobile Services (43%), Tilling & British Automobile Traction (28%), the London & North Eastern Railway (24%) and the London Midland & Scottish Railway (3%). Also included were United's bus and lorry coachbuilder, based in Lowestoft, which was renamed to Eastern Coach Works and supplied bus bodies to its parent company and operators within the Tilling & British Automotive Traction group on various chassis. By the end of the 1930s, the Eastern Counties Omnibus Company had purchased another 50 operators.

In September 1942, Tilling & British Automobile Traction was placed into administration, with the Eastern Counties Omnibus Company shareholding transferred to the Tilling Group. In November 1948, Eastern Counties was included in the nationalisation of the Tilling Group, becoming part of the British Transport Commission, which was merged with the Transport Holding Company in January 1969 to become the National Bus Company.

In preparation for bus deregulation, in September 1984, Eastern Counties' operations in Cambridgeshire were transferred to a separate company named Cambus Limited. The company was sold into privatisation from the National Bus Company in February 1987 through a management buyout, which was followed by its coaching operations transferring to Ambassador Travel of Great Yarmouth in December 1987.

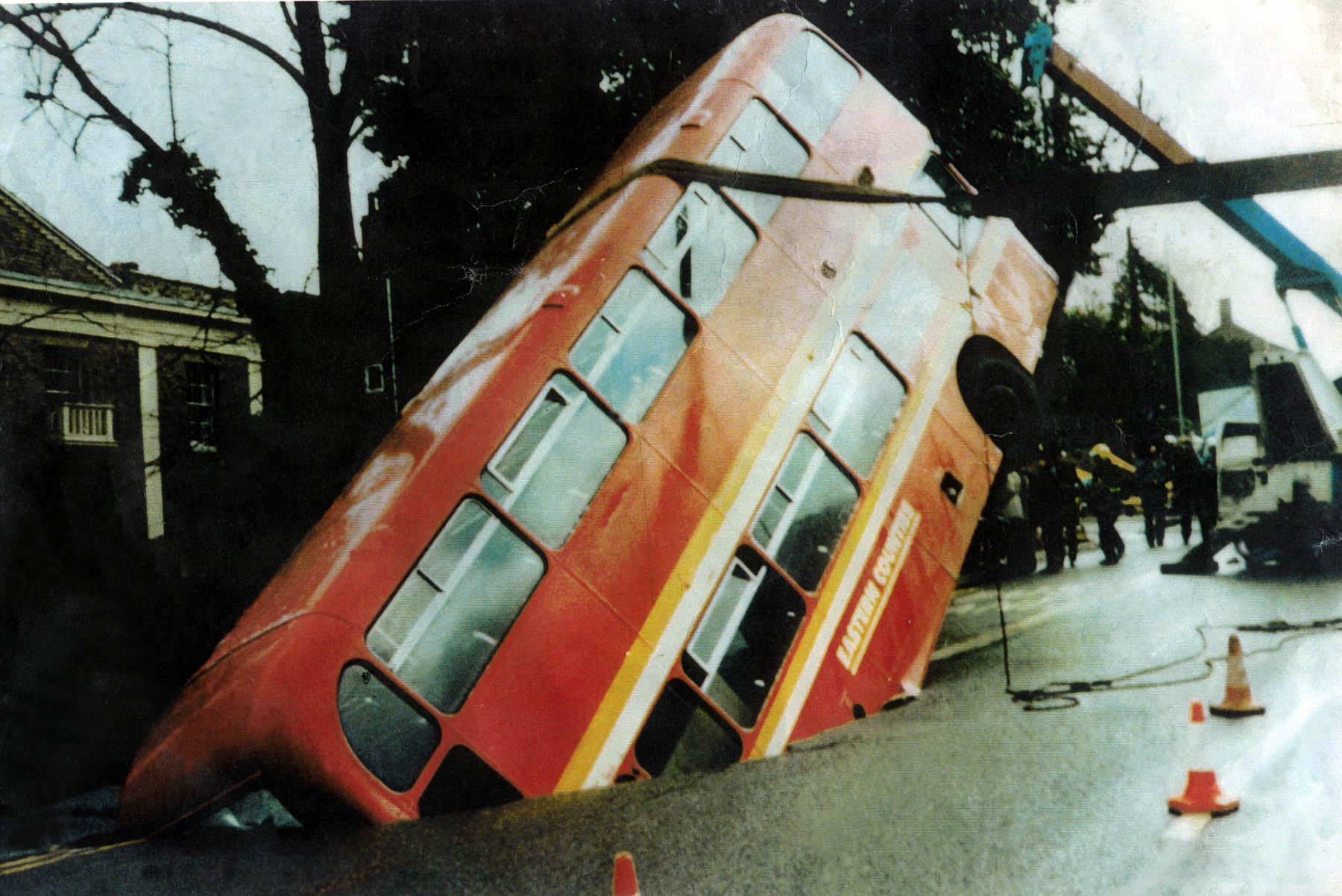
An Eastern Counties Bristol VRT being removed from a sinkhole on Earlham Road, 3 March 1988

An Eastern Counties Bristol VRT double decker bus made international headlines when it fell rear-first into a 26 feet (7.9 m) sinkhole formed from a medieval chalk mine running underneath Earlham Road in Norwich on 3 March 1988. The driver of the bus, along with the passengers on board, managed to escape minutes before the bus fell further into the sinkhole, which severed a gas main running underneath the road and resulted in the overnight evacuation of the nearby area while the main was repaired. A photograph of the incident was used by Cadbury the next day in full-page newspaper advertisements and on billboards to promote their Double Decker chocolate bar, captioned with the slogan "Nothing fills a hole like a Double-Decker".

In July 1994, Eastern Counties was sold to the GRT Group for £6.7 million, which merged with Badgerline to form FirstBus in June 1995. FirstBus later purchased the operations of Great Yarmouth Transport in September 1996, merging it into the First Eastern Counties operation.

In April 2011, First Eastern Counties' King's Lynn operations were sold to Norfolk Green.

== Divisions ==
First operates out of five main depots; each division provides services to the area around its depot:

=== Network Norwich ===
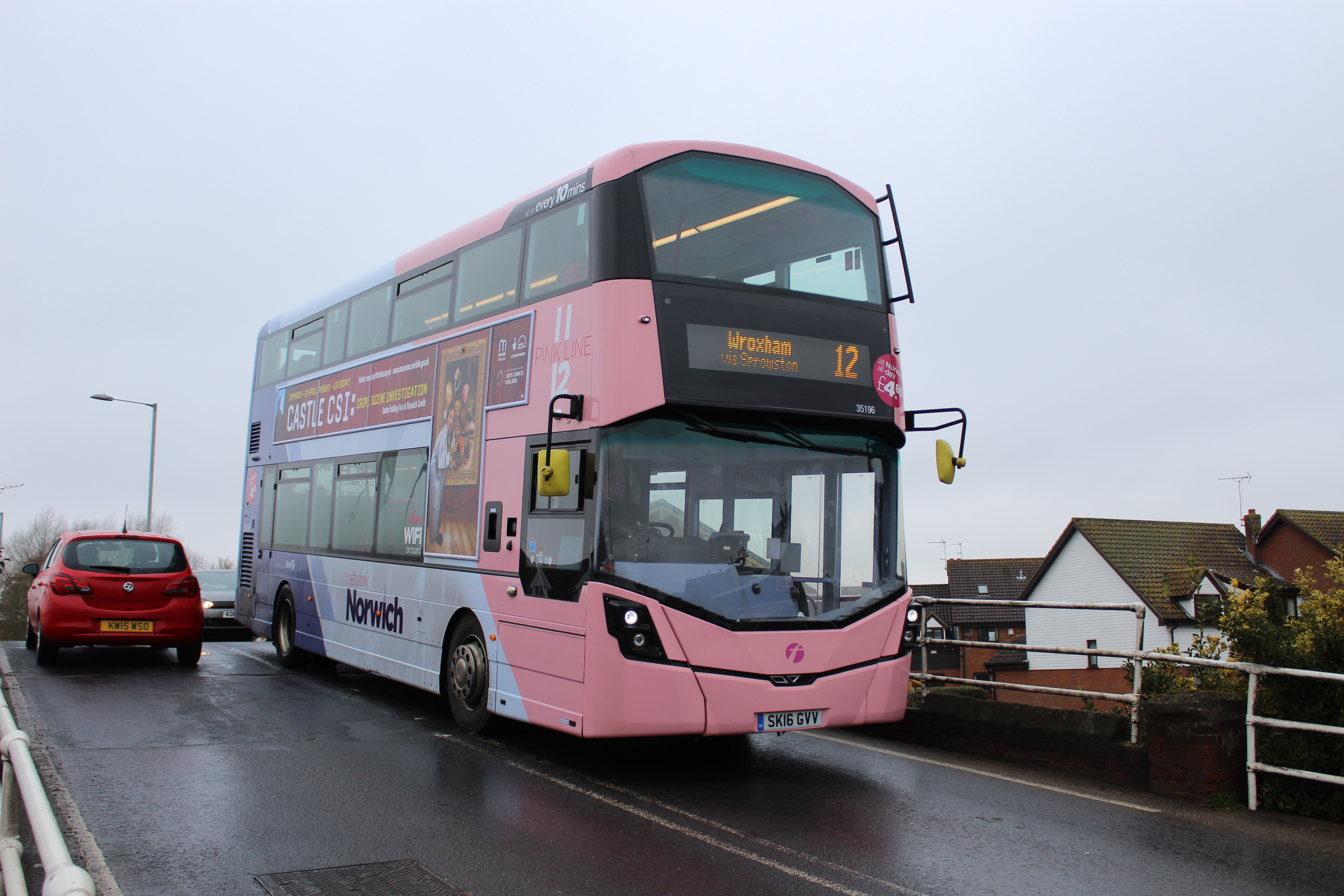
A Network Norwich Pink Line branded Wright StreetDeck in Wroxham in March 2018

First Eastern Counties operates services branded as the Network Norwich within the city centre of Norwich and to towns and villages within approximately a 20 miles (32 km) radius. This network was launched on 23 September 2012, with buses painted in colour-coded route branding on the fronts to reflect the line in the network they were allocated to.

On 22 March 2017, First announced that they were to introduce a direct bus service numbered X41, running between Norwich and Bungay in Suffolk via Ditchingham, as part of the Charcoal colour line. This line was launched in April 2016 with service 40 from Norwich to Poringland.

The Network Norwich operation was one of five FirstGroup operations to begin taking delivery of battery electric buses in 2023, funded through the Zero Emission Bus Regional Areas (ZEBRA) grant from the UK government. The first seven buses from an order for 59 Wright StreetDeck Electroliner double-decker buses began entering service in October 2023, while eleven Wright GB Kite Electroliner single-deck buses are also on order for delivery to Norwich during 2024. When completed, this order is set to replace pre-existing diesel buses at First's Roundtree Way depot.

=== First Great Yarmouth ===
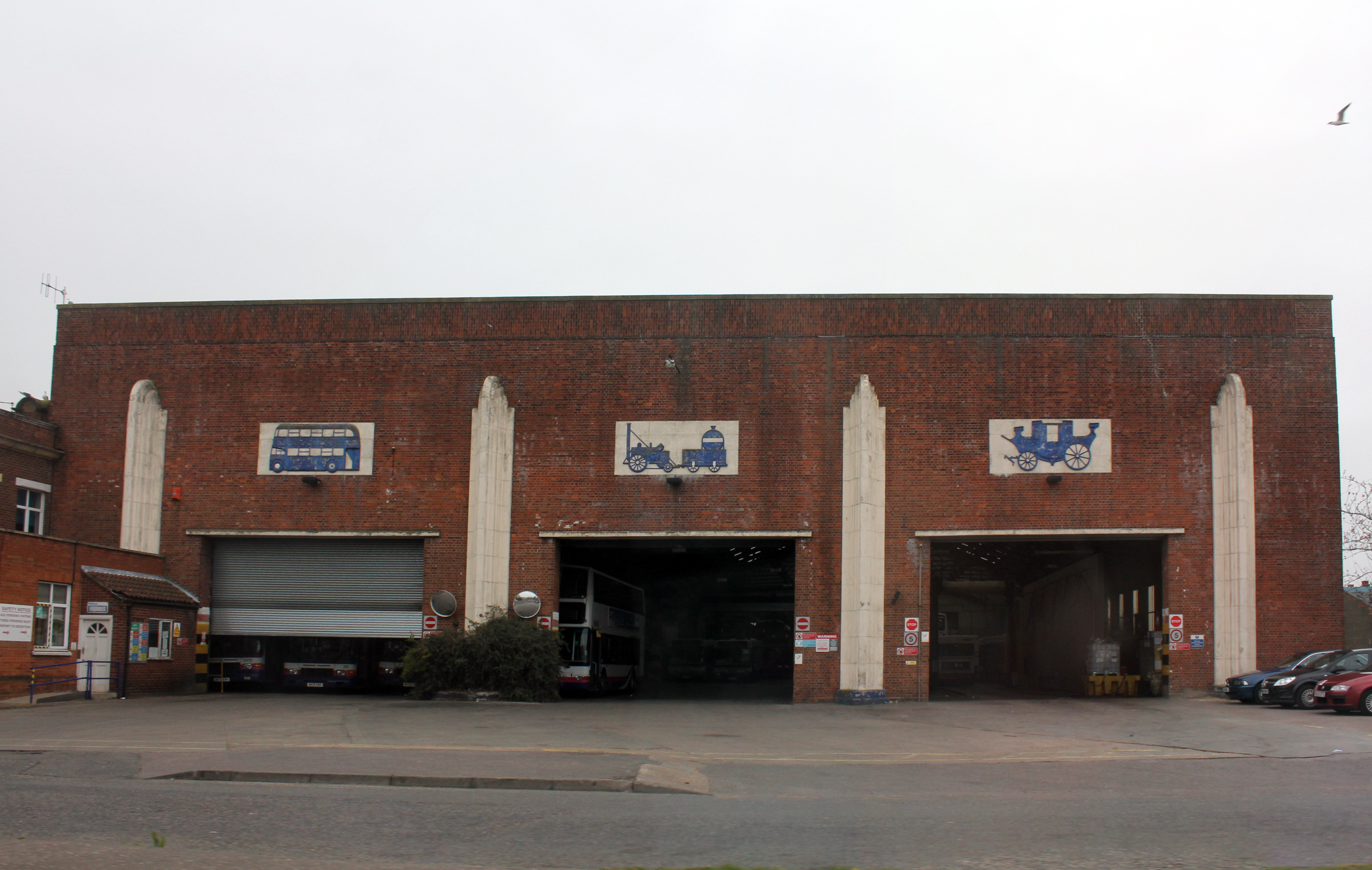
The Caister Road bus depot in Great Yarmouth in April 2012

First Great Yarmouth operates services within the towns of Great Yarmouth and Gorleston-on-Sea, as well as dedicated routes to Norwich and Lowestoft under the Coastlink brand. The Great Yarmouth services operate out of the old Great Yarmouth Transport depot on Caister Road, which is a listed building dating back to the mid-1900s, retaining its original frontage.

=== First Lowestoft ===
First Lowestoft operates services within the town of Lowestoft, as well as dedicated routes to Great Yarmouth, Beccles and Norwich. The Lowestoft services operate out of Britain's most easterly bus depot, situated on Gordon Road, just a few hundred metres away from Ness Point.

=== First Ipswich ===
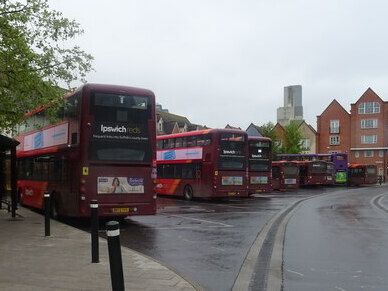
Ipswich Reds' Wright StreetDecks at Old Cattle Market bus station in May 2023

First Ipswich operates within and around the town of Ipswich to a radius of about 30 miles (48 km). The Ipswich services operate out of one depot situated on Star Lane, just a few minutes walk from the town's bus station in the Old Cattle Market.

A guided bus system named Superoute 66 was established in February 1995, running between Ipswich town centre and the suburbs of Kesgrave and Martlesham Heath, in partnership between Eastern Counties and Suffolk County Council, commencing operations with a fleet of six Plaxton Pointer bodied Dennis Darts. This service was the first commercially-run guided bus system to be operated in the United Kingdom, and was eventually upgraded to use double-decker buses under FirstBus.

Having previously operated Ipswich's park and ride service from 2008 until November 2013, First Ipswich resumed operating the service in July 2017. In 2019, First rebranded their Ipswich operation to Ipswich Reds and introduced a new red livery for the town's services.

== Services ==
=== Excel ===
A number of services are operated under the Excel brand, most notably the services between Peterborough, King's Lynn and Norwich and the X1 between Norwich, Great Yarmouth and Lowestoft. This service is operated by nineteen Alexander Dennis Enviro400 City bodied Scania N250UDs that were delivered in early 2020, which are painted in a red livery and featuring high-specification interiors, next stop announcements and camera mirrors.

Prior to July 2014, the Excel and X1 operated as a single service straight through from Peterborough to Lowestoft, 107 miles (172 km) end-to-end. The Excel is operated by King's Lynn outstation - the only service operated by the outstation - whilst Great Yarmouth and Lowestoft depots operate the X1 and related services, branded as Coastlink.

=== Coastlink ===
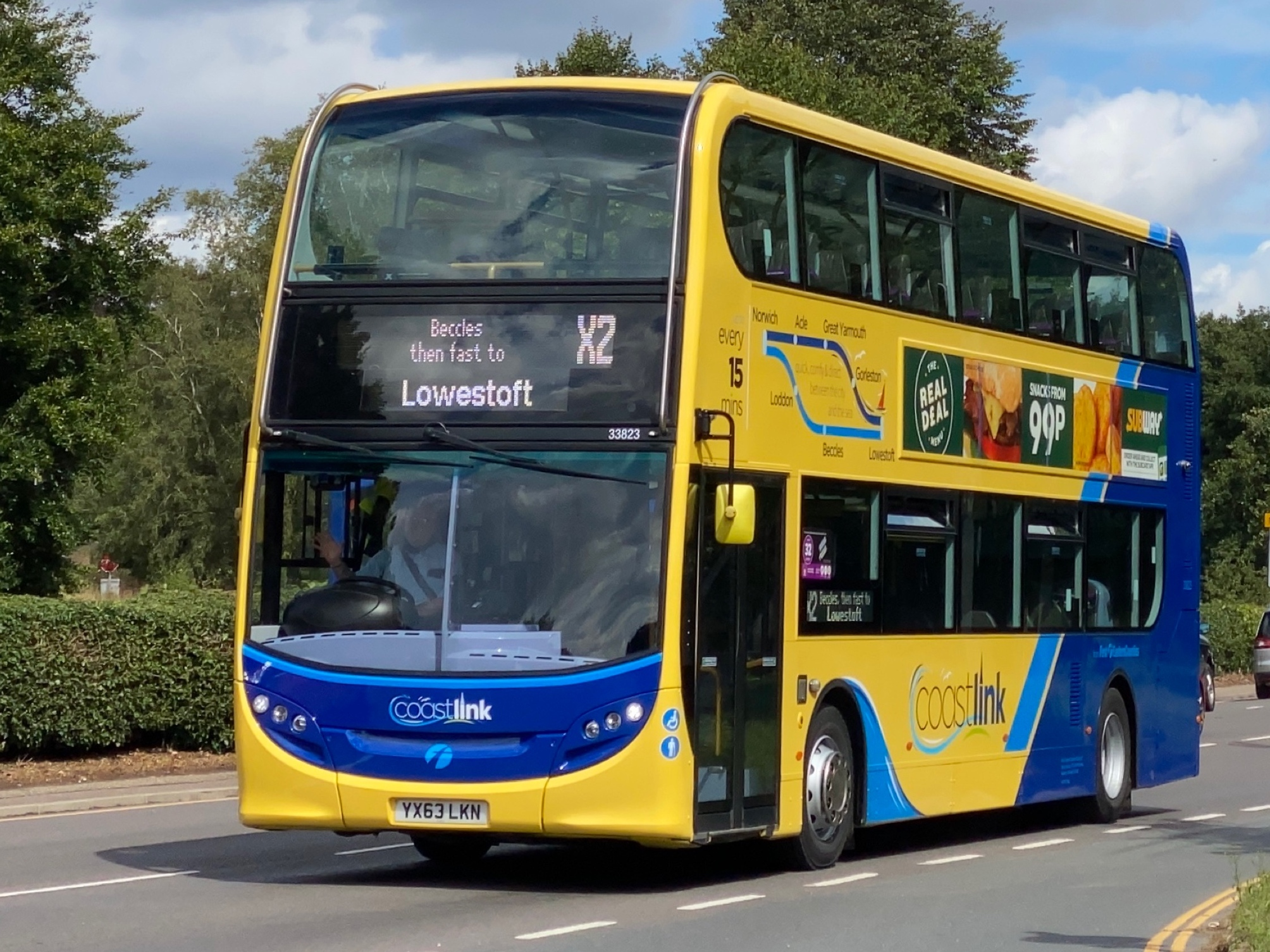
A Coastlink Alexander Dennis Enviro400 in Lakenham, Norwich in August 2020

First Eastern Counties also provide a number of Coastlink branded feeder services at the eastern end of the main Excel service, operated using the Alexander Dennis Enviro400s formerly used on the core route. Prior to February 2018, the Excel ran all the way from Peterborough to Lowestoft; Coastlink services replaced the Excel between Norwich and Lowestoft after this time.

The X2 operates between Norwich bus station and Lowestoft bus station, as with the X1; however, it stops more frequently and is routed via Gillingham, Beccles, Worlingham and Carlton Colville. The X2 operates every 30 minutes from Monday to Saturday daytimes. Minor variations of the route of the X2, known as the X21 and X22, operate more infrequently to serve surrounding villages along the route of the X2, including North Cove and Whitton; the X21 three journeys in the morning peak and five in the evening peak, while the X22 runs every hour from Monday to Saturday daytimes.

The X11 operates as a variation of the X1, shadowing the route of the X1 between Norwich and Gorleston-on-Sea via Great Yarmouth, before diverging at James Paget University Hospital to serve and terminate in Belton rather than continuing onwards to Lowestoft. The X11 operates every 30 minutes from Monday to Saturday daytimes.

=== Coastal Clipper ===
First Eastern Counties' year-round Coastal Clipper services connect a number of seaside resorts in Norfolk and Suffolk, with service 99 using closed-top buses branded in blue livery, serving Lowestoft and Southwold, via Pakefield and Kessingland; service 99 briefly gained a 99A variant linking Bungay and Southwold, running five times a day, following the withdrawal of services by Go-Ahead Group owned Konectbus in early 2019. Coastal Clipper buses also operate on services 1 and 1A, serving Hopton-on-Sea and Lowestoft via Martham, Hemsby, Caister-on-Sea, Great Yarmouth and Gorleston-on-Sea; service 1A received recognition in June 2023 in a guide by Snaptrip as one of the most scenic bus routes in the United Kingdom.

From April until September, six Coastal Clipper Cabriolet-branded open-top buses based at Great Yarmouth are operated on seafront service 1C. This service was launched in March 2021 and runs seasonally between Hemsby Beach and the Great Yarmouth seafront via Hemsby, Scratby and Caister-on-Sea.
