= Sanders Coaches =

Bus operator based in Holt, England

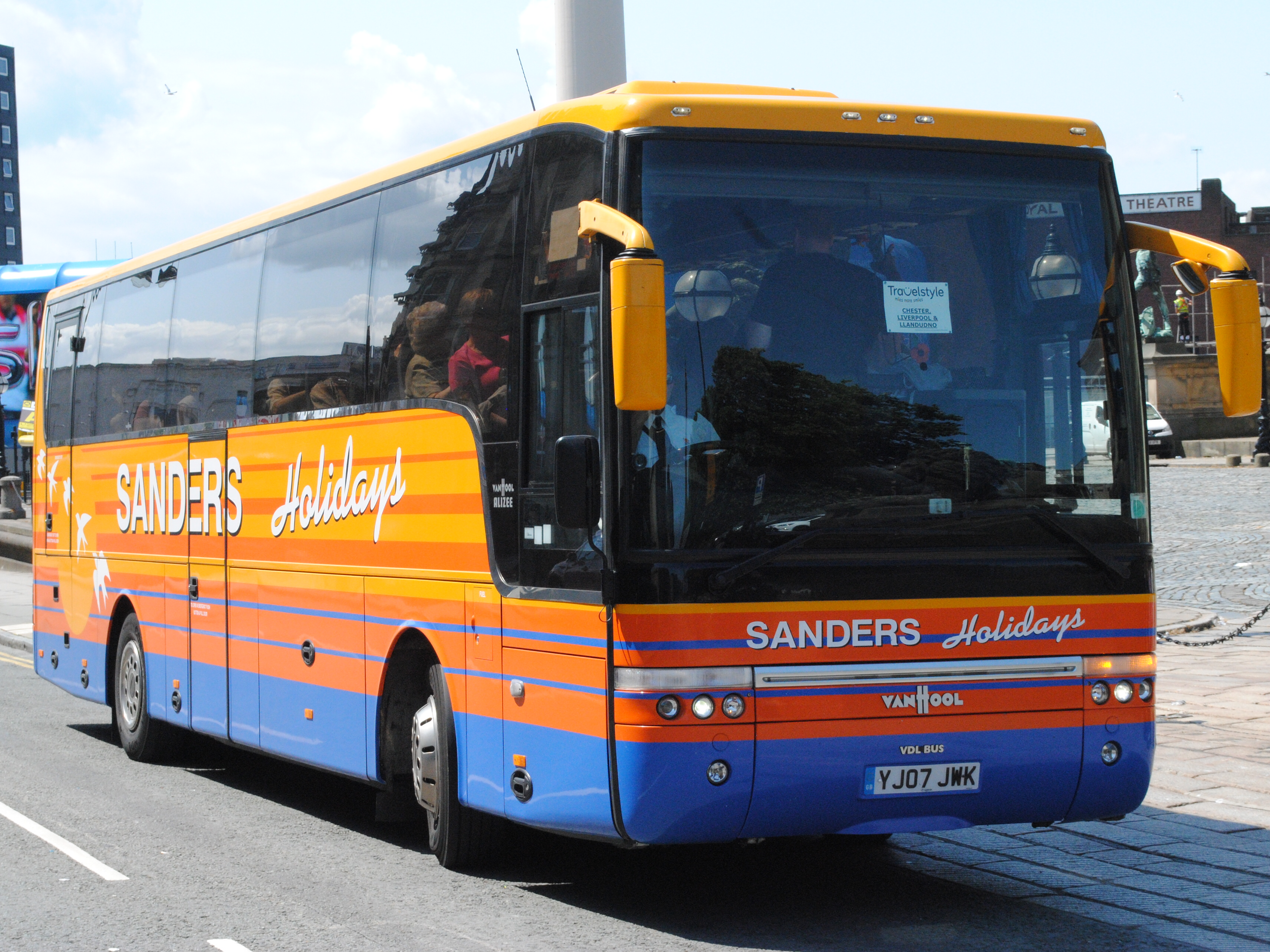
- Founded: 1 December 1975
- Headquarters: Holt
- Service area: Norfolk
- Service type: Bus and coach services
- Depots: Holt; North Walsham
- Website: www.sanderscoaches.com

Sanders Coaches is a bus and coach operator based in Holt, Norfolk, England. Its managing director is Charles Sanders. As of September 2021, it has approximately 115 employees.

== History ==
Sanders Coaches was founded on 1 December 1975 by Norman J Sanders, following the retirement of Sanders' employer George Bennett. Sanders took over six vehicles from Bennett's Coaches. Sons Paul and Charles later joined the company.

Initially a coach operator, Sanders was encouraged by the local authority to begin operating local bus services when deregulation occurred in 1986. Its first route ran from Sheringham to Holt.

On 1 March 1992, Sanders bought Bammant's Coaches in Fakenham as its owner was ready to retire. The addition of Bammants' 15 vehicles made it the largest coach operator in Norfolk with 62 vehicles.

In 2019, Sanders closed its Fakenham depot, merging its operations with its depot in Holt.

In May 2020, Sanders Coaches was given permission to expand its depot in Holt. In 2024, Sanders bought a former Sheffield Insulations warehouse on Bessemer Road in South Norwich, for use as a new depot.

In May 2026, Sanders Coaches bought Semmence Coaches of Wymondham.

== Routes ==
Sanders operates the majority of bus services in North Norfolk.

When Stagecoach in Norfolk ceased operations in April 2018, Sanders took over the eastern section of its Coasthopper route, between Wells-next-the-Sea and Cromer, which Sanders extended to North Walsham. At Wells, it connects with Lynx's Coastliner which goes to Hunstanton and King's Lynn. In 2021 and 2022, six new MCV Evora-bodied Volvo B8RLEs were bought for the service. Chris Haslam of The Sunday Times named the Coasthopper and Coastliner "the two best buses in Britain."

In 2021, the firm introduced the number 8 Holt Hopper service, a local service operating within Holt, funded by section 106 contributions from local housing estates. This route was withdrawn on 2 September 2023, due to low patronage.

Many improvements to local services have been made in recent years, in part due to bus service improvement plan funding from the UK government. These include increased frequencies on the X55 route between Norwich and North Walsham via Coltishall, the 54 Between Norwich and North Walsham Via Badersfield, the 43 between Norwich and Aylsham/ Reepham, and the X40/X41/X44/44A between Norwich and Sheringham via Cromer, among other improvements.

== Fleet ==
As of 2023, Sanders has a fleet of 85, a mixture of buses and coaches, a majority of which have Volvo chassis.

In May 2021, the firm purchased a new Plaxton Panther coach. In 2022, the firm increased its fleet of Volvo B8RLE buses to ten.

Sanders also has three Yutong TC9 midi coaches, including the first PSVAR compliant example.
