= Konectbus =

British bus operating company

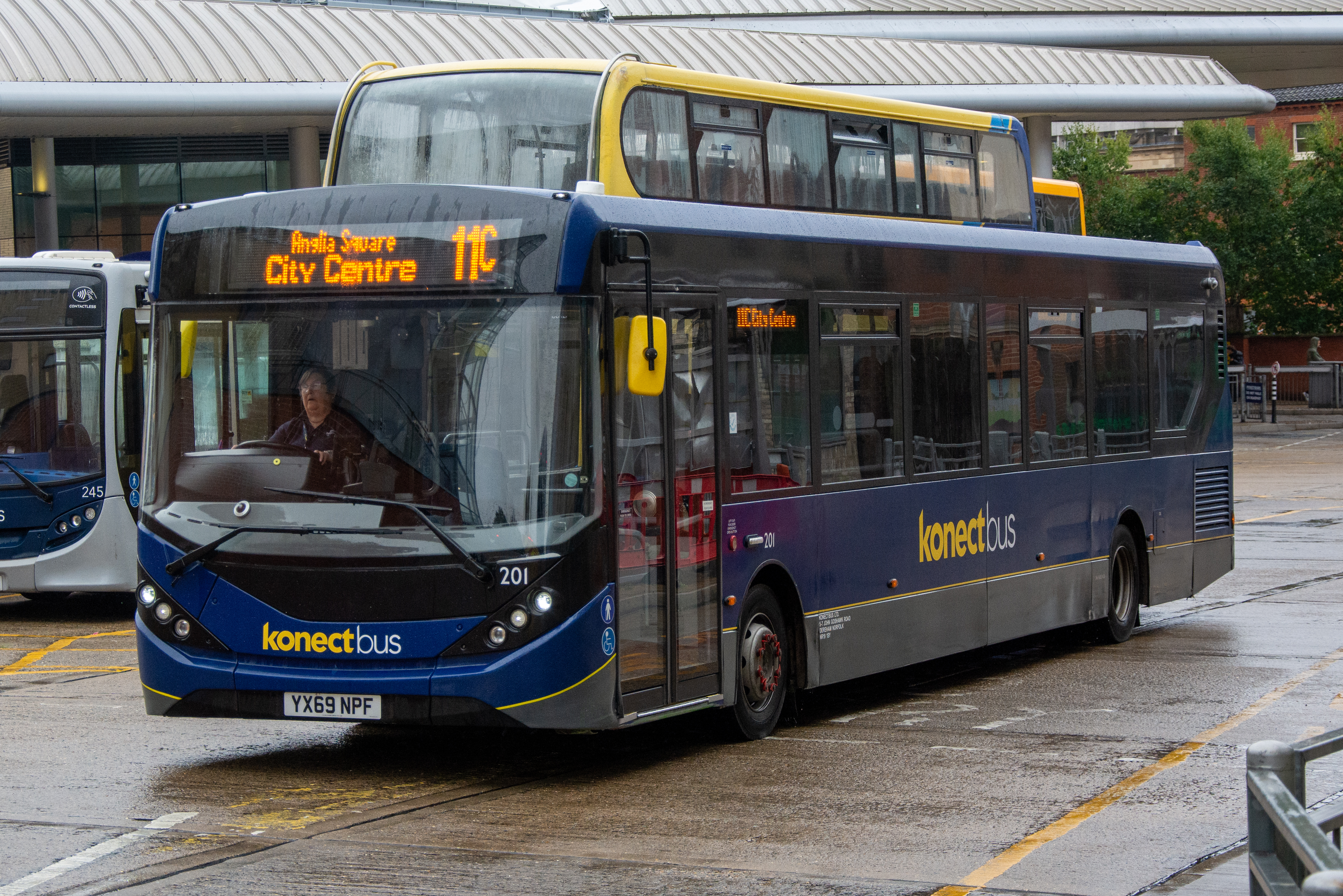
- Alexander Dennis Enviro200 MMC at Norwich bus station in September 2025
- Parent: Transport Made Simple
- Founded: 1999
- Defunct: 2026
- Headquarters: Dereham
- Locale: East of England
- Service area: Dereham; Norwich; Swaffham; Watton; Wymondham; Fakenham; Wroxham
- Service type: Bus services
- Depots: 1
- Fleet: 53 (May 2025)
- Managing Director: Peter Nathanail
- Website: www.konectbus.co.uk

Konectbus was a bus operator based in Dereham in Norfolk, England. It was a subsidiary of the Transport Made Simple group, having previously been owned by the Go-Ahead Group until the completion of Go East Anglia's purchase by Transport Made Simple on 1 October 2025. On 30 June 2026 Central Connect announced the merger between Konnectbus and Central Connect.

== History ==
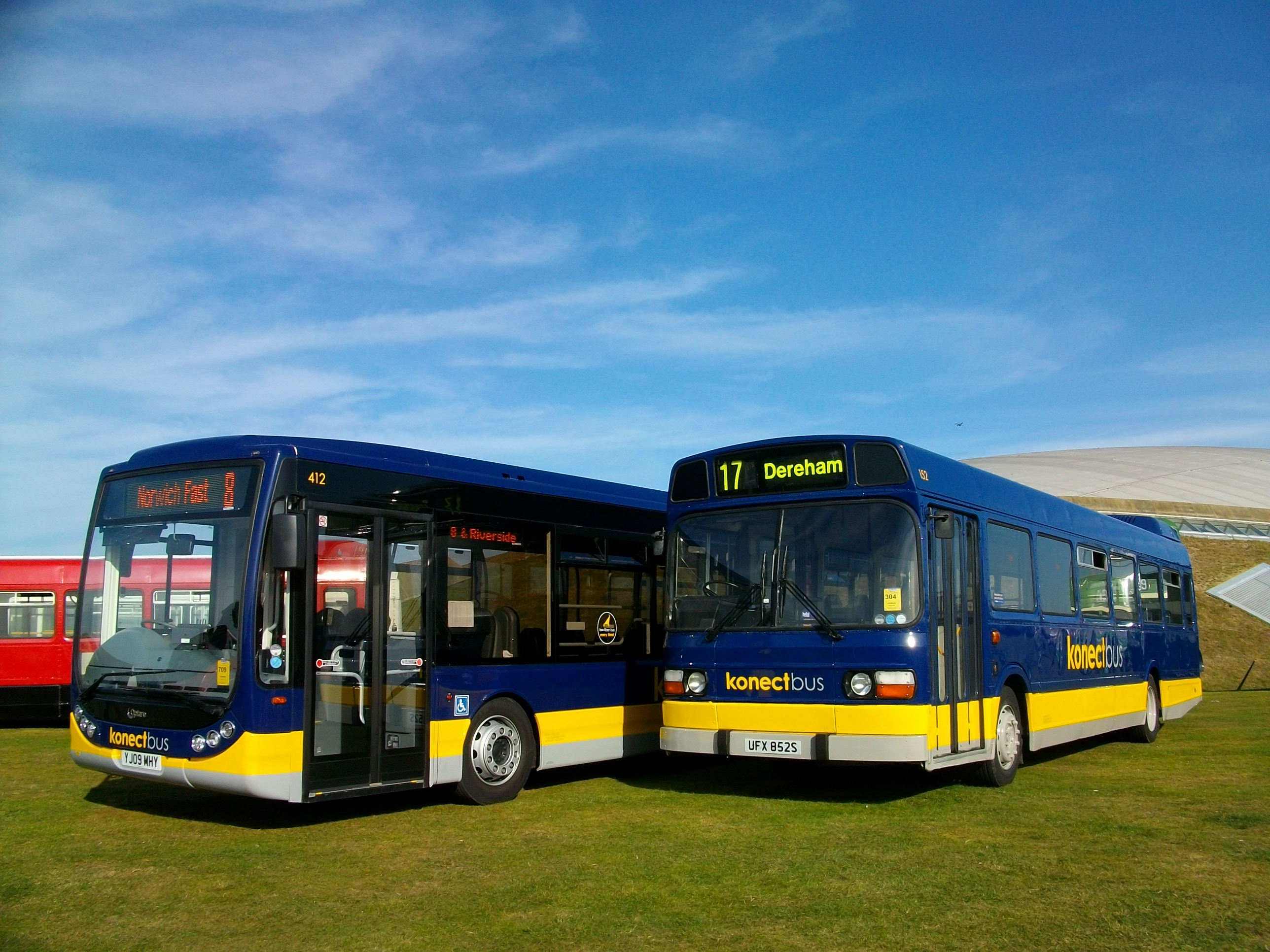
Optare Tempo and heritage Leyland National at Showbus 2009

Konectbus was formed in 1999 when the Saham Toney depot of Norfolk Green was purchased from with four coaches, originally trading as Konect. The company moved out of coach operations and into tendered bus services. In 2003, the company was renamed Konectbus.

In 2004, the depot was relocated to Toftwood. In March 2013, a new depot was opened in Rashes Green Industrial Estate. In 2005, Konectbus began to operate two park & ride services under contract to Norfolk County Council.

In March 2010, Konectbus was sold to the Go-Ahead Group. In November 2017 Konectbus took over all seventeen routes and twenty buses of sister company Anglian Bus.

In March 2025, Go East Anglia announced it was to begin consolidating its bus operations in the East of England under the Konectbus brand from June 2025. As a result, the original Konectbus operation was renamed Konectbus Norfolk. The Essex and Suffolk subsidiary of Go East Anglia, Hedingham & Chambers, was rebranded to Konectbus Essex and Suffolk in June 2025.

In September 2025, Go East Anglia announced that it was to be acquired by the Transport Made Simple group, an independent group of operators based in the East Midlands and East of England. Following the completion of the deal on 1 October 2025, Transport Made Simple announced that a two-phase network review, starting in January 2026 with extensive consultation of passengers and local authorities, would aim to simply operations across Norfolk, Suffolk and Essex and address poor service reliability recently faced by Konectbus. As part of this review, Transport Made Simple plans an investment in new vehicles for the Konectbus fleet.

=== Acquisitions ===
Konectbus logo before rebrand in March 2025

Logo of former "anglianbus" bus operator

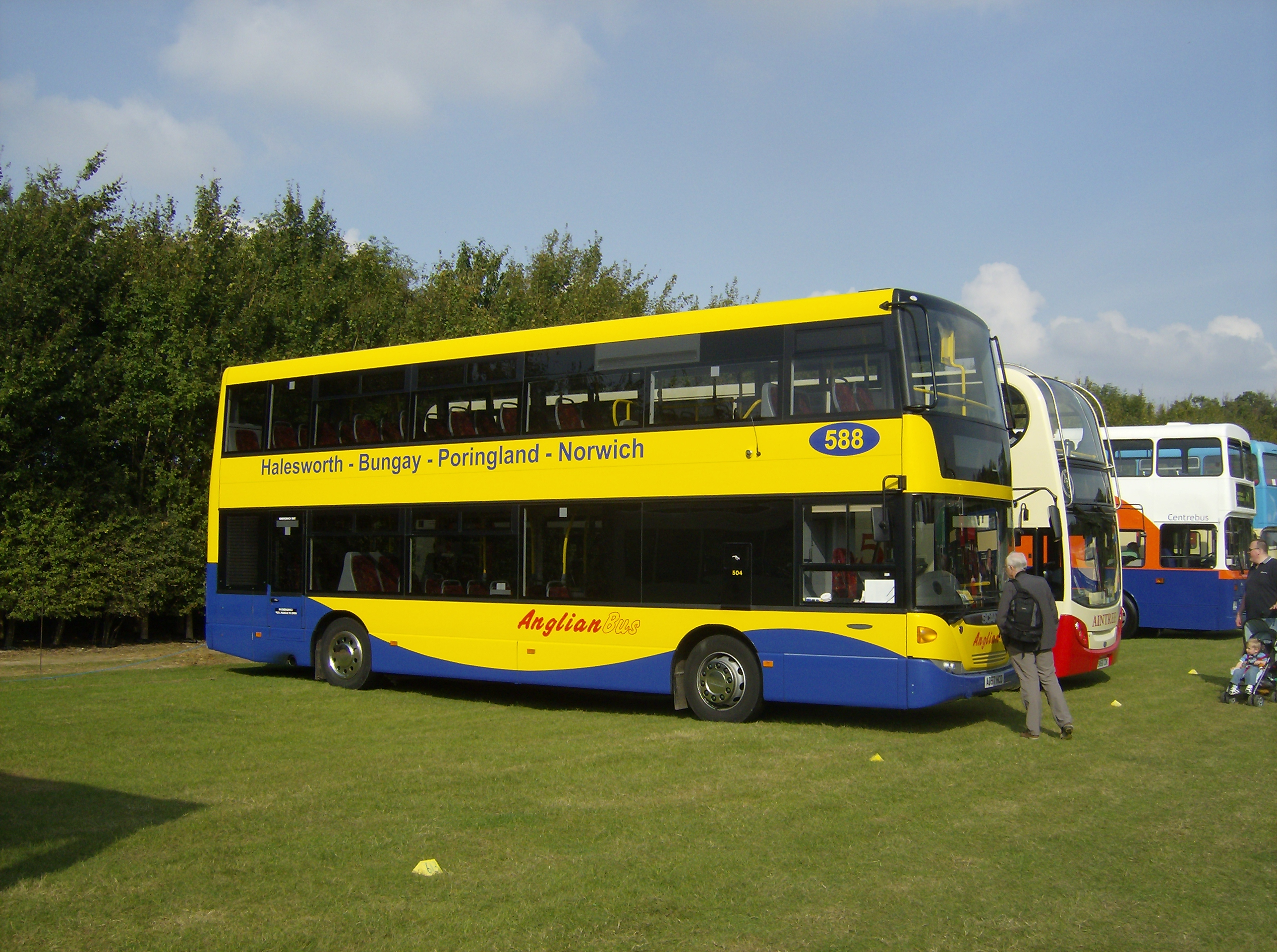
Anglian Bus Scania OmniCity in September 2008

Anglian Bus was a bus operator based in Beccles. A subsidiary of the Go-Ahead Group, it operated services in both Norfolk and Suffolk from 1981 until 2017.

Anglian Bus was formed in 1981 by David and Christine Pursey, operating charter services and school services from a depot in Loddon. In January 1999, Anglian Bus began operating its first public bus service numbered 580 between Diss and Great Yarmouth under contract to Norfolk County Council.

In October 2000, the depot was relocated to Beccles Business Park, where a purpose built garage was constructed on 5 acres (20,000 m^{2}) of freehold land. This depot had a MOT testing facility. In 2003, the company began its first commercial service from Halesworth to Norwich. In 2004, a second depot at New Rackheath, near Norwich opened. It has since closed and is now used as an outstation by sister company Konectbus.

In April 2012, Anglian Bus was sold to the Go-Ahead Group. On 19 November 2017, Anglian Bus ceased trading with all routes and buses transferred to Konectbus.

Anglian Bus operated a number of services, both standard routes and more limited services. Both urban and rural areas were served, with many of the company's routes running into the city of Norwich serving Norwich bus station. Great Yarmouth and Lowestoft were also served by many routes. At the time operations ceased in November 2017, the fleet comprised twenty vehicles.

== Services ==
Konectbus operate services in Norfolk, based out of hubs at Norwich bus station, which it operates, Dereham, and Watton. Konectbus operate a number of local bus services into Norwich and Dereham from surrounding suburbs, towns, and villages, it also operates a high speed service between Dereham and Norwich, the 8.
