= Network Norwich =

Bus service

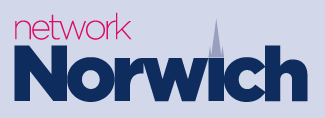

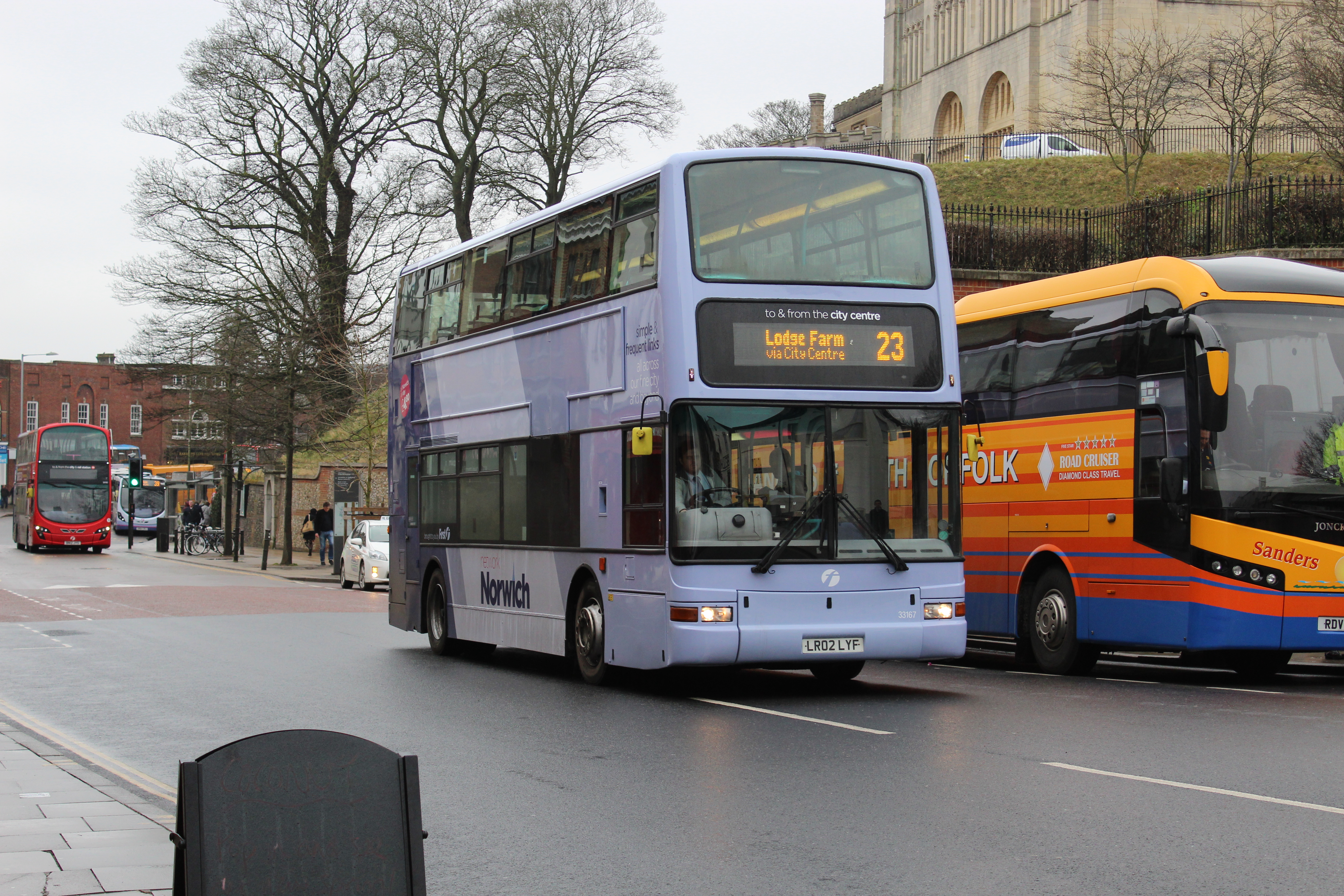
- A Dennis Trident 2 double-decker carrying the lilac-fronted generic Network Norwich livery, March 2018
- Founded: 23 September 2012
- Headquarters: Norwich
- Service area: Norfolk; Suffolk
- Service type: Bus services
- Routes: Nine colour-coded lines 35 individual routes
- Destinations: Acle; Attleborough; Bungay; Fakenham; Heartsease; Hellesdon; New Costessey; Poringland; Taverham; Thorpe Marriott; Wroxham; Wymondham
- Hubs: Norwich city centre
- Fleet: 160 (January 2024)
- Operator: First Norfolk & Suffolk

Network Norwich is the brand name given to First Norfolk & Suffolk bus services in and around the city of Norwich, England. First launched in September 2012, the network now consists of nine colour-coded lines extending across Norwich city centre, outer suburbs, and surrounding towns and villages across Norfolk and into Suffolk.

== History ==
The network was launched on 23 September 2012, with the rebranding of several First Norfolk & Suffolk bus routes within the Norwich city area as colour-coded lines. The Charcoal Line was added most recently, being launched to Bungay in Suffolk in May 2017.

The network began with the repainting of existing buses into Network Norwich livery, a variant of FirstGroup's national corporate Olympia scheme, "dipped" with colour-coded front ends; these buses included Dennis Tridents and Volvo B7TLs with Plaxton President bodywork, Volvo B9TLs with Wright Eclipse Gemini 2 bodywork, and Volvo B7Ls and Volvo B7RLEs with Wright Eclipse bodywork.

The first brand new buses for the network, eight 10.8-metre, 37-seater Wright StreetLite DF single-deckers, were delivered in November and December 2014. Eleven longer-wheelbase 41-seater Wright StreetLite Max single-deckers were delivered for the Green Line in November 2015, followed by nine Wright StreetDeck double-deckers for the Pink Line in April 2016.

The Yellow Line was extended to Fakenham in north Norfolk on 3 April 2018, as First took over service X29 from Stagecoach, who ceased all operations in the area. On 3 September 2018, the Purple Line was extended with the launch of route 36A to Harleston. From 7 January 2019, the Charcoal Line was extended with First taking over routes 40A and 41A from Konectbus.

== Core network ==
=== Pink Line – / 11 / 11A / 12 ===
The Pink Line consists of services 11, 11A and 12. The 11 begins at Hethersett throughout the day, starting at West Croft and continuing via Coachmaker Way and Hethersett Lane towards the Norfolk and Norwich University Hospital, where the 11A and 12 begin. Service 11A begins at Hethersett in the evenings. All services head northwards to the city and run through Cringleford, Eaton, Norwich city centre, Sprowston where the 11 and 11A terminate, with the 12 terminating in Hoveton.

The routes serve City College Norwich, Anglia Square shopping centre, Sprowston Tesco, Sprowston Manor, the quays along the River Bure in Hoveton and Wroxham, Hoveton & Wroxham railway station and the Bure Valley Railway.

The Pink Line operates every ten minutes during daytimes from Monday to Saturday, with buses to Hoveton and Wroxham running half-hourly. Only service 11A runs on Sundays, between Hethersett and Sprowston. In April 2016, the Pink Line was upgraded, receiving nine brand new Wright StreetDeck buses featuring free WiFi on board and e-leather seats. Additionally, in 2023, First Eastern Counties received sixteen Wright StreetDeck Electroliner buses, which also serve the Pink Line.

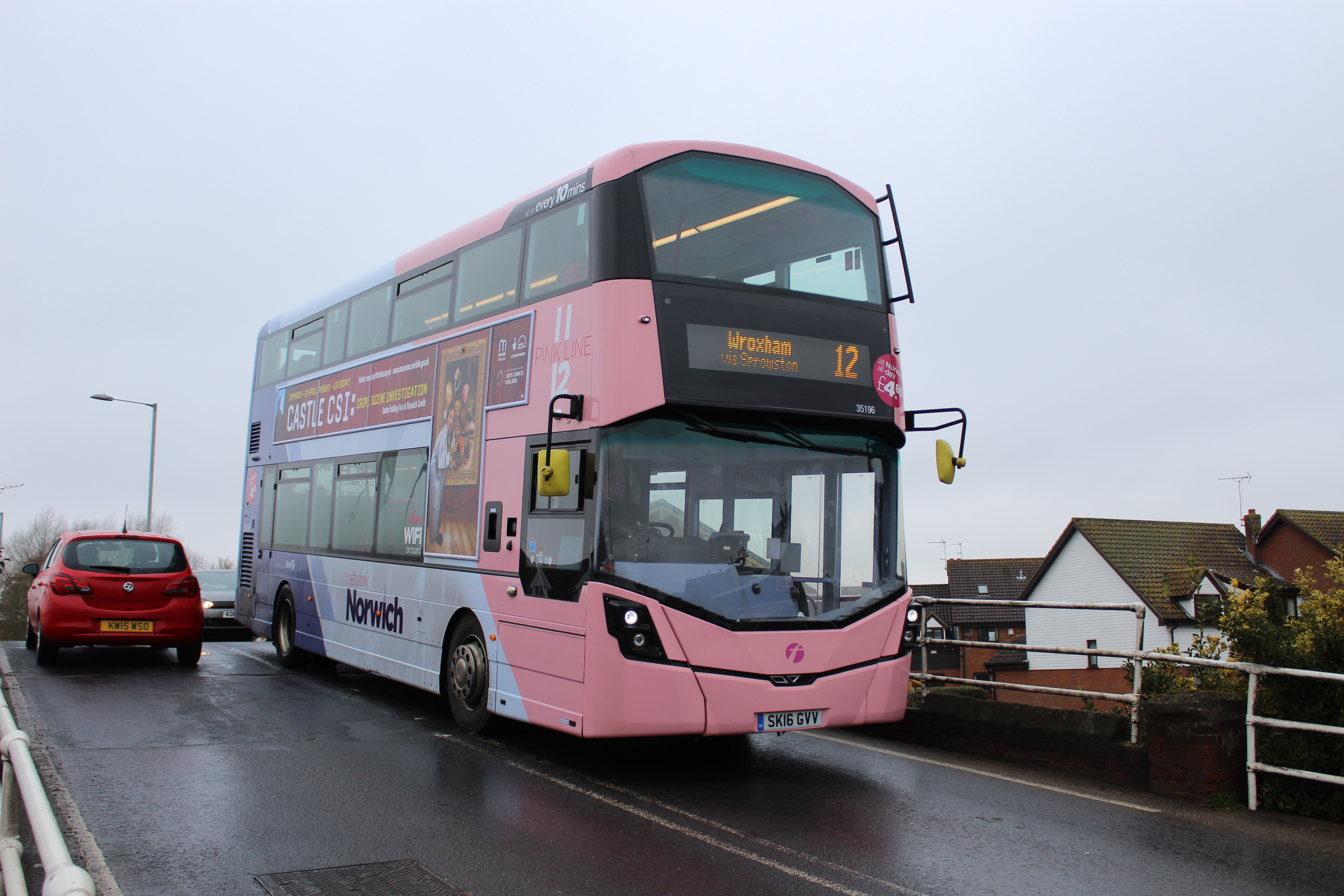
A Pink Line Wright StreetDeck crossing the bridge in Wroxham, March 2018.

=== Turquoise Line – 13 / X13 ===
The Turquoise Line consists of services 13 and X13. The routes start at Attleborough and runs northwards through Wymondham, Hethersett, Norwich City Centre (where the X13 terminates) and Old Catton, with the 13 terminating at Spixworth.

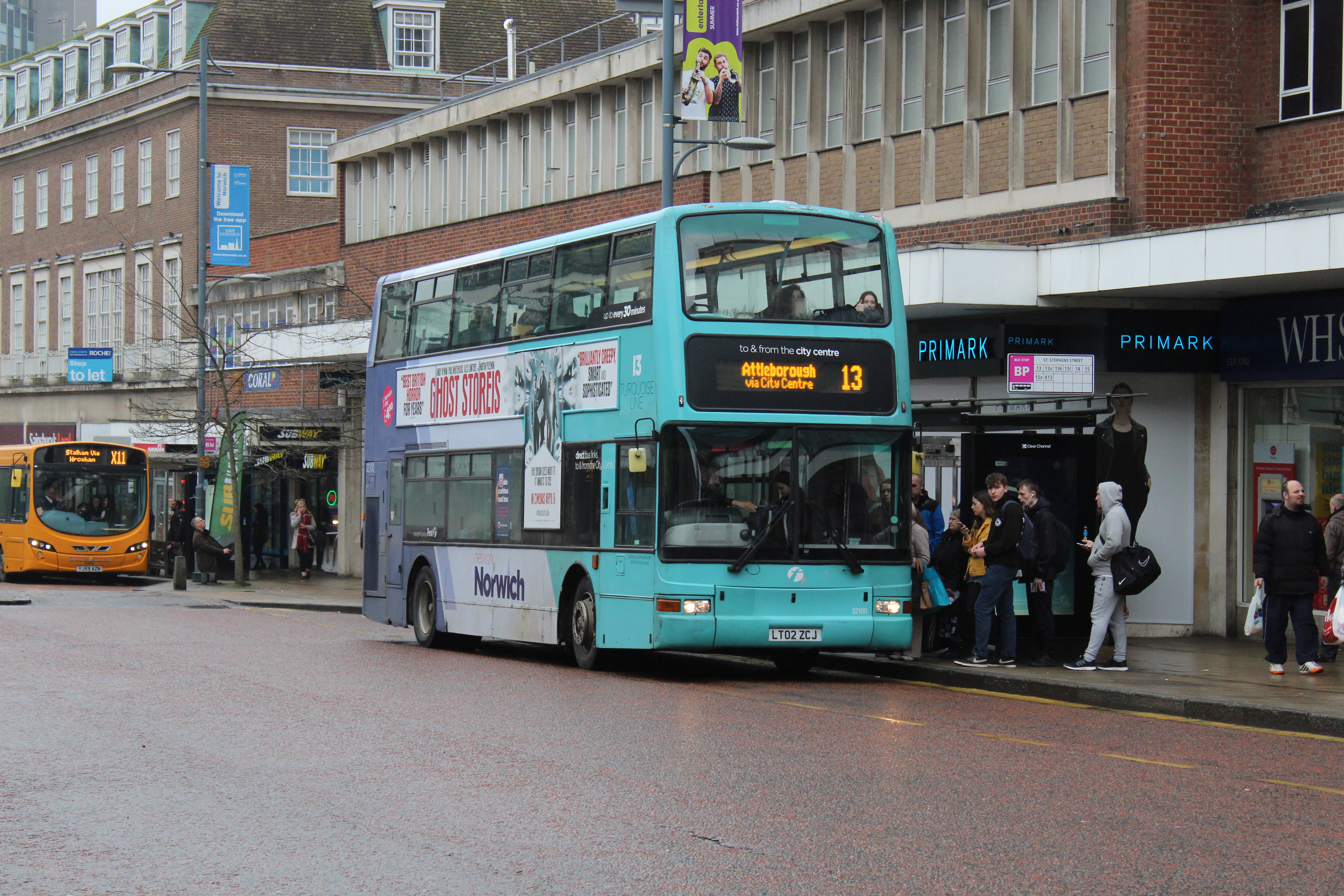
A Turquoise Line bus in Norwich city centre, March 2018.

The routes serve Attleborough Academy, Wymondham town centre, Wymondham Leisure Centre, Cringleford Interchange and Anglia Square shopping centre.

The 13 operates up to every thirty minutes during daytimes from Monday to Saturday, and hourly during evenings and on Sundays and bank holidays. The X13 runs twice per day on weekdays: once in the morning inbound to Norwich, and again in the evening, outbound to Attleborough. The route is operated predominantly using Volvo B9TL/Wright Eclipse Gemini 2 buses in turquoise livery, however in recent months spare Network Norwich-branded Volvo B9TL/Wright Eclipse Gemini 2 and Wright StreetDeck buses frequent the route.

=== Green Line – 14 / 14A / 15 / 15A / 16 / 17 ===
The Green Line consists of services 14, 14A, 15, 15A, 16 and 17. Services 14A, 15(A) and 16 all begin in Silfield, with the 14 beginning at Wymondham Cross, the routes head east through Hethersett, Norwich city centre, Dussindale where the 14 terminates, Brundall, Blofield, Blofield Heath where the 15 terminates, and Lingwood where the 16 terminates. Service 14A is a late evening service, beginning in Silfield and following the same route as the 14, through the Wymondham and Hethersett estates, and terminating at Norwich City Centre. Services 15A and 16A are early morning services beginning in Silfield, following the same route as the late 14A service, continuing along Yarmouth Road and terminating and Broadland Business Park.

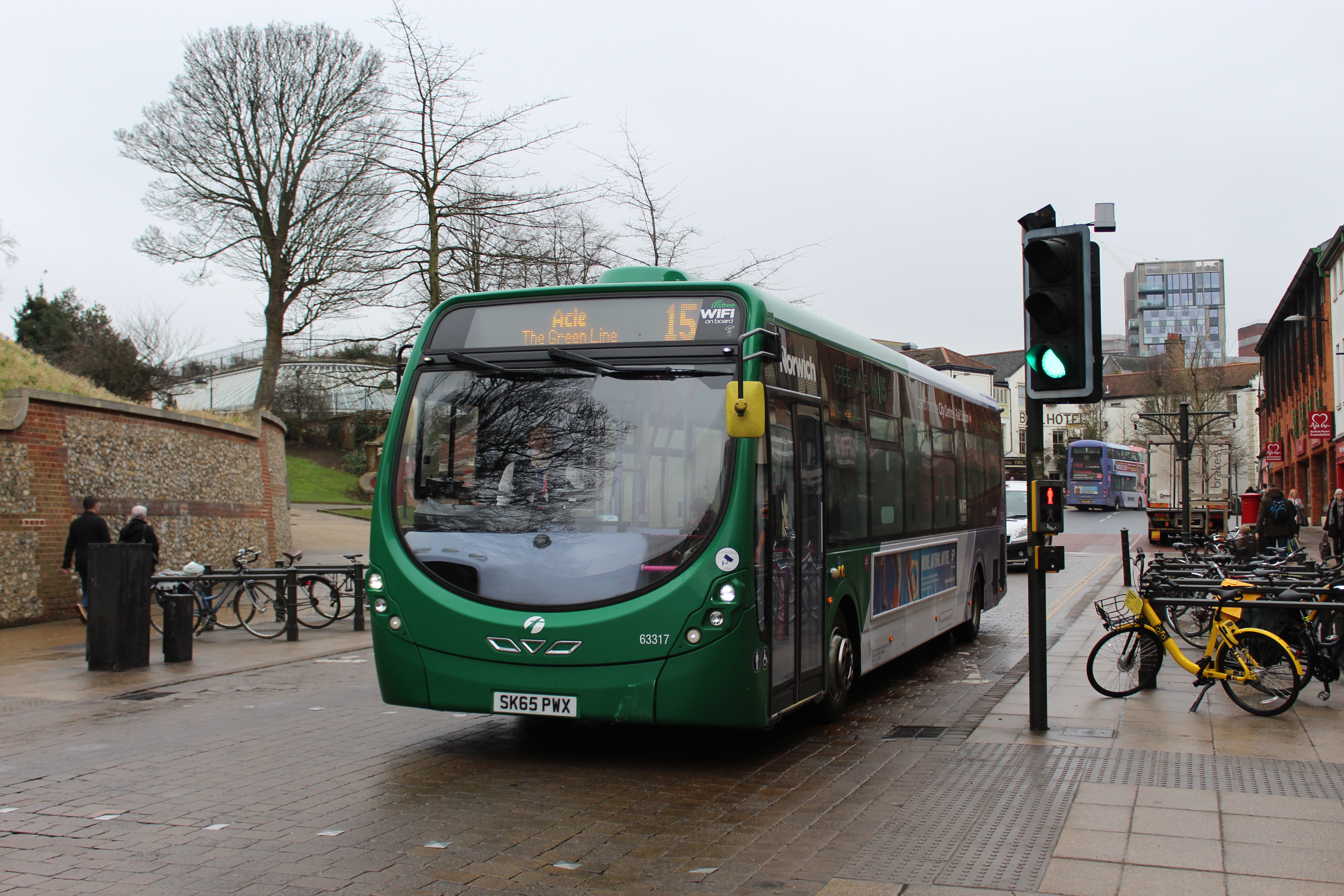
A Green Line Wright StreetLite MAX in Norwich city centre, March 2018.

The routes serve Wymondham Leisure Centre, Hethersett Academy, Norwich railway station, Broadland Business Park, Brundall railway station, Lingwood railway station.

The Green Line operates every fifteen minutes between Wymondham and Yarmouth Road during daytimes from Monday to Saturday, every thirty minutes between Norwich city centre, Dussindale and Brundall, and every hour between Blofield and Lingwood. On Sundays and bank holidays, frequencies along all parts of the route are every hour. The service was upgraded in November and December 2015, receiving eleven Wright StreetLite Max Single Deck Buses to operate the service.

=== Orange Line – 21 / 21A ===
The Orange Line consists of routes 21 and 21A. The 21 and 21A start at the Norfolk and Norwich University Hospital, and run east through Bowthorpe and West Earlham to Norwich city centre, before turning north and terminating in Old Catton at White Woman Lane.

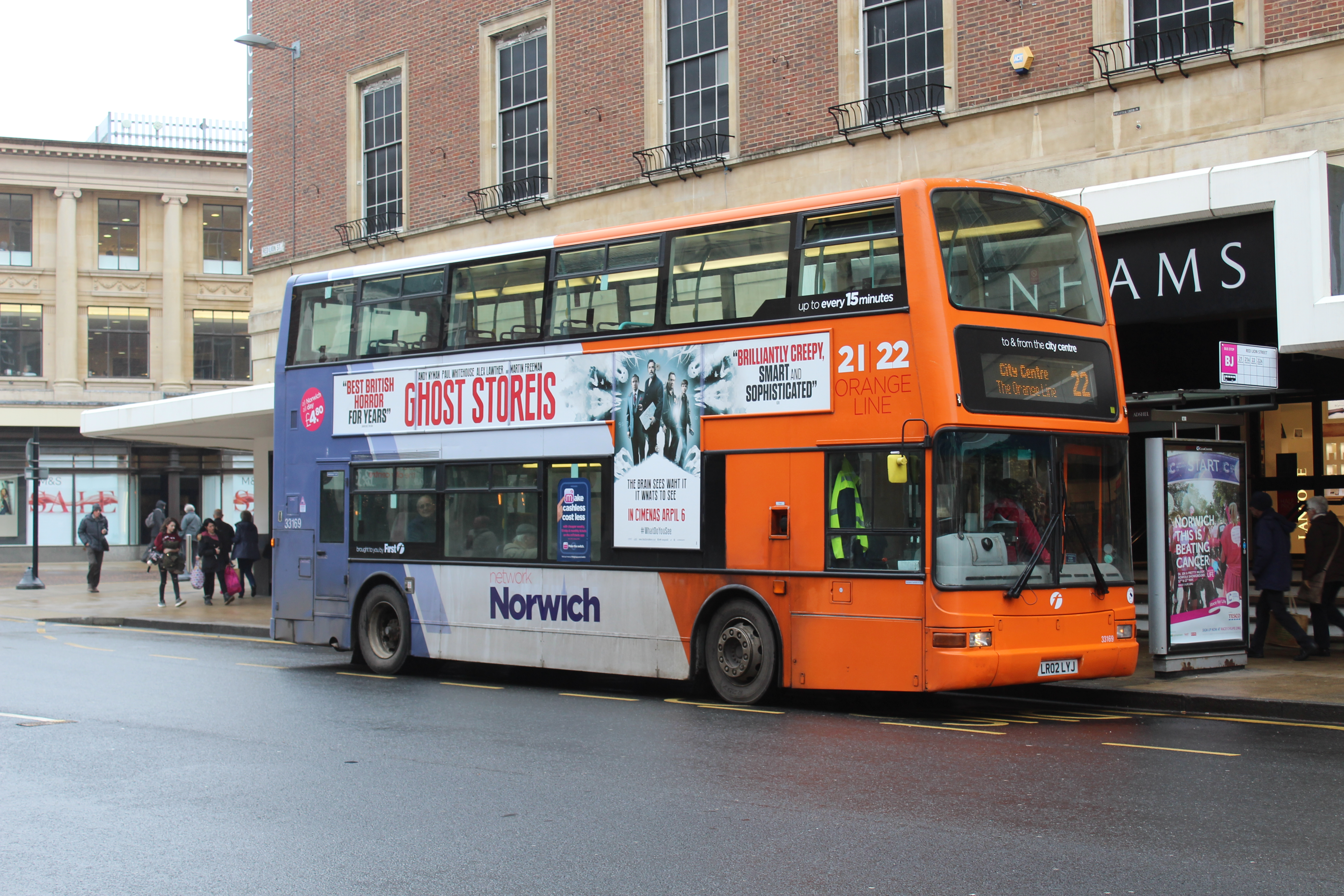
An Orange Line bus in Norwich city centre, March 2018.

The routes serve the Norwich Research Park, the Norfolk and Norwich University Hospital, Three Score, Chapel Break, Bowthorpe Shopping Centre, Clover Hill, West Earlham shops, Bowthorpe Road, Dereham Road, Anglia Square shopping centre and Old Catton.

Between Old Catton, the city centre and Bowthorpe, the routes operate every 15 minutes during daytimes Monday to Saturday and up to every 30 minutes during evenings on these days. Between Bowthorpe and the university or hospital, the routes operate every 30 minutes at all times. 21 and 21A services operate hourly on Sundays combining to make a 30-minute frequency.

The Orange Line is primarily operated by Orange Line braded Wright StreetDeck buses, however these are slowly being replaced by new Wright StreetDeck Electroliner buses, of which First Eastern Counties are receiving 59.

=== Red Line – 23 / 23A / 23B / 24 / 24A / 24B ===
The Red Line operates up to every seven minutes along Dereham Road and Plumstead Road during daytimes from Monday to Saturday, reducing to every 30 minutes in the evenings. From Queen's Hills or Costessey to the city centre, and from Heartsease or Thorpe St. Andrew to the city centre, the Red Line operates every 15 minutes during daytimes from Monday to Saturday, every 20 minutes on Sundays and bank holidays and every 30 minutes during evenings. The service is operated using Volvo B9TL/Wright Eclipse Gemini 2 and Wright StreetDeck Electroliner double decker buses.

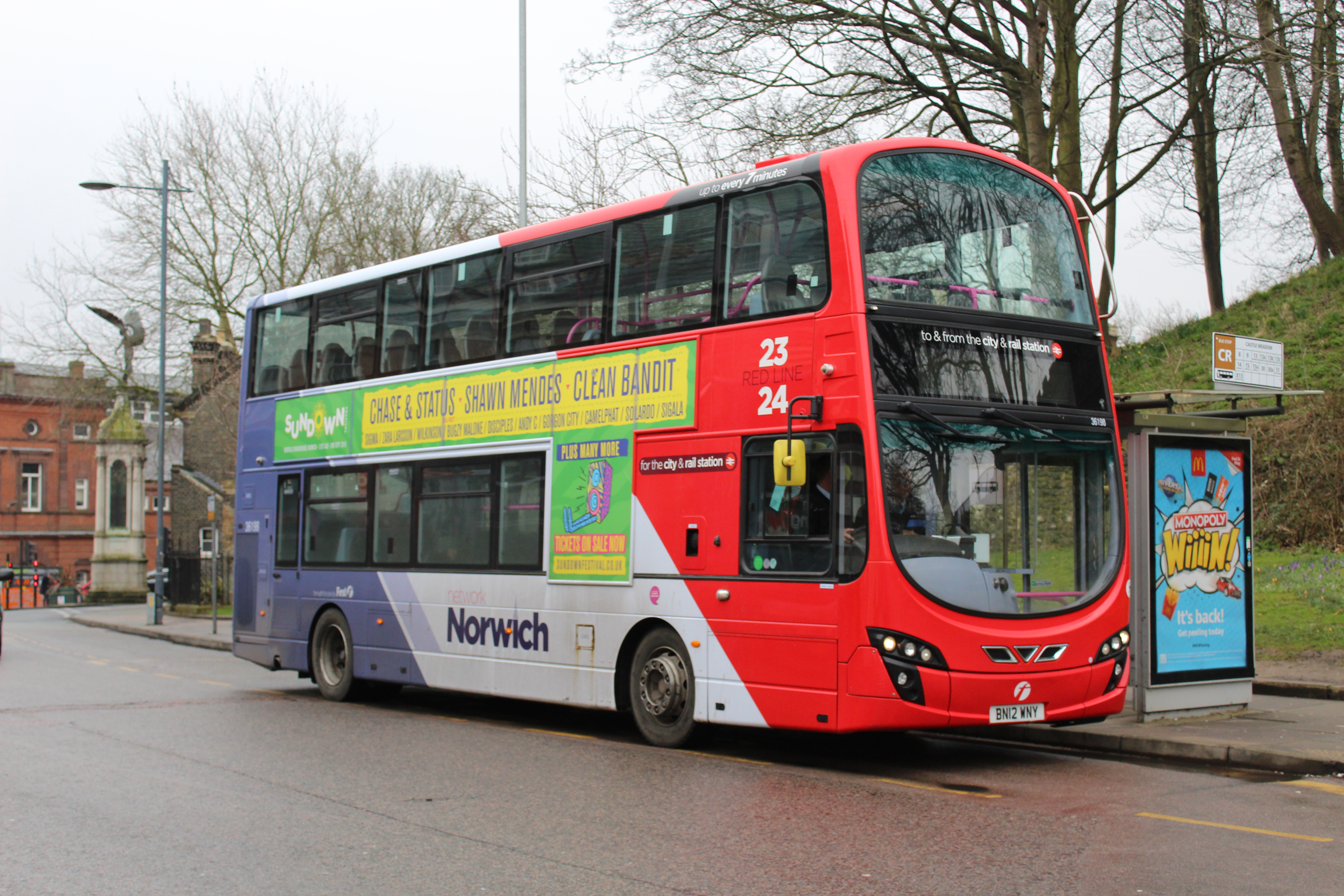
A Red Line Wright Gemini 2 in Norwich city centre, March 2018.

=== Blue Line – 25 / 26 / 26A ===
The Blue Line consists of services 25, 26 and 26A, which link the University of East Anglia with the Norfolk and Norwich University Hospital, Norwich city centre and Norwich railway station.

The services take the following routes, the 25 starts at UEA and runs via Eaton Park and Unthank Road to the City Centre before continuing to Norwich Railway Station, via Riverside Retail Park. Route 26 starts at either Norfolk and Norwich University Hospital or UEA (26 Evenings), with the 26A starting at Bowthorpe Shopping Centre. They both then serve UEA Main Bus Stop on their way to the City Centre, via The Avenues and Earlham Road, then continue to Norwich Railway Station via Riverside Retail Park.

The Blue Line operates up to every seven minutes during Monday to Saturday daytimes between the university and the city centre, reducing to every 10 minutes on Sundays and bank holidays, every 15 minutes during evenings and every hour overnight after midnight. Between the university and the hospital, the service operates every 30 minutes at all times. The service is operated using Volvo B9TL/Wright Eclipse Gemini 2 Double Deck Buses. Unlike other refurbished buses of this type, the interior retains blue grab rails and the original seat cover design. The only other line to share this trait is the Turquoise Line. Wright StreetDeck Electroliner buses also operate this service, following their introduction by First Eastern Counties.

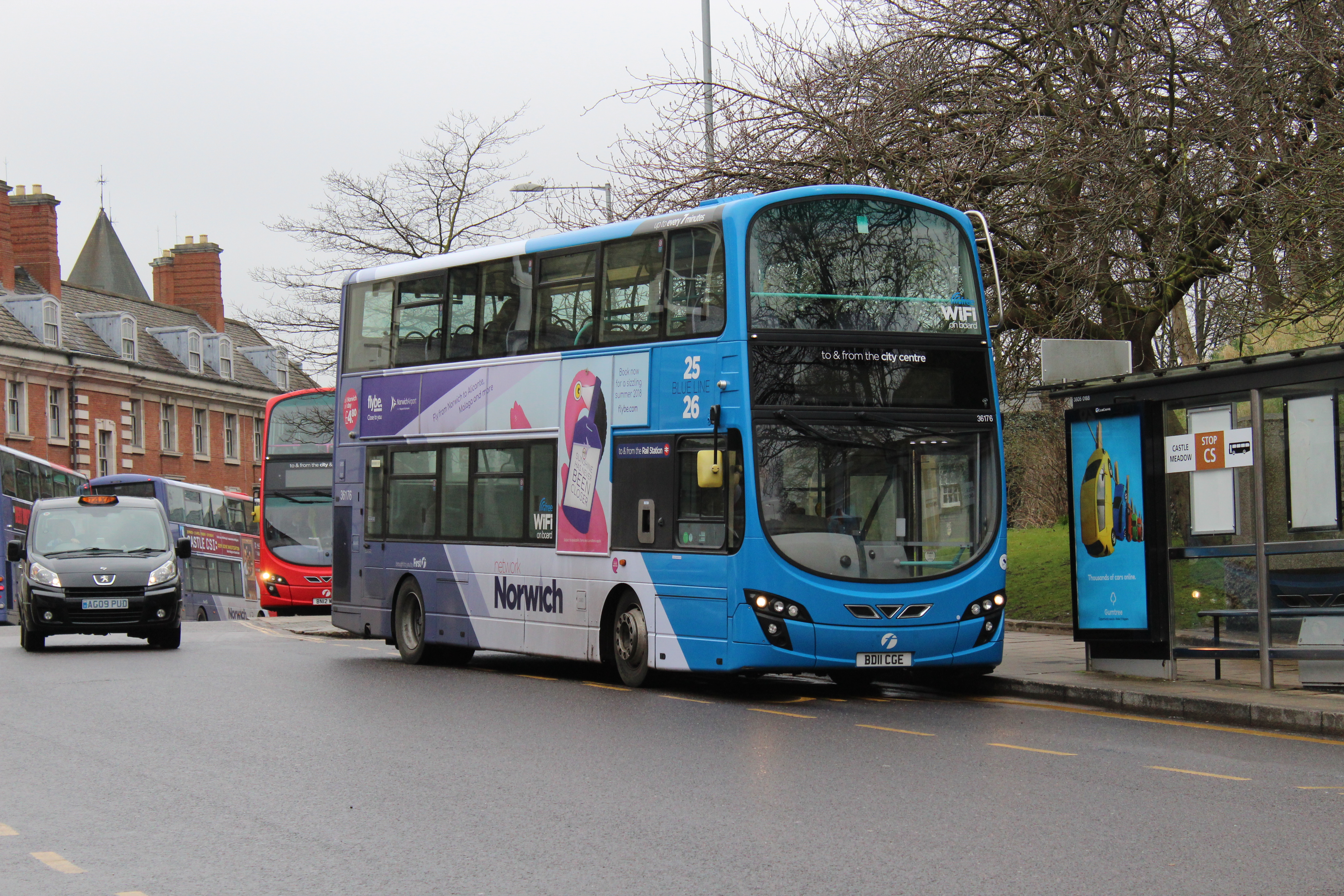
A Blue Line Wright Gemini 2 in Norwich city centre, March 2018.

=== Yellow Line – 28 / 29 / X29 ===
The Yellow Line consists of services 28, 29 & X29. The X29 starts in Fakenham, running mainly along the A1067 road through Guist, Twyford, Bintree, Foxley, Bawdeswell, Lenwade and Attlebridge. The 28 starts in Thorpe Marriott and the 29 starts in Taverham; the 28, 29 and X29 all join together in Taverham, running along the Drayton High Road through Drayton into Norwich city centre, where all three terminate.

The routes serve Fakenham Market Place, Pensthorpe Natural Park, Bawdeswell Garden Centre, the Dinosaur Park at Lenwade, Taverham High School, Hinks Meadow, Hellesdon Hospital, Sweet Briar Retail Park and Anglia Square shopping centre.

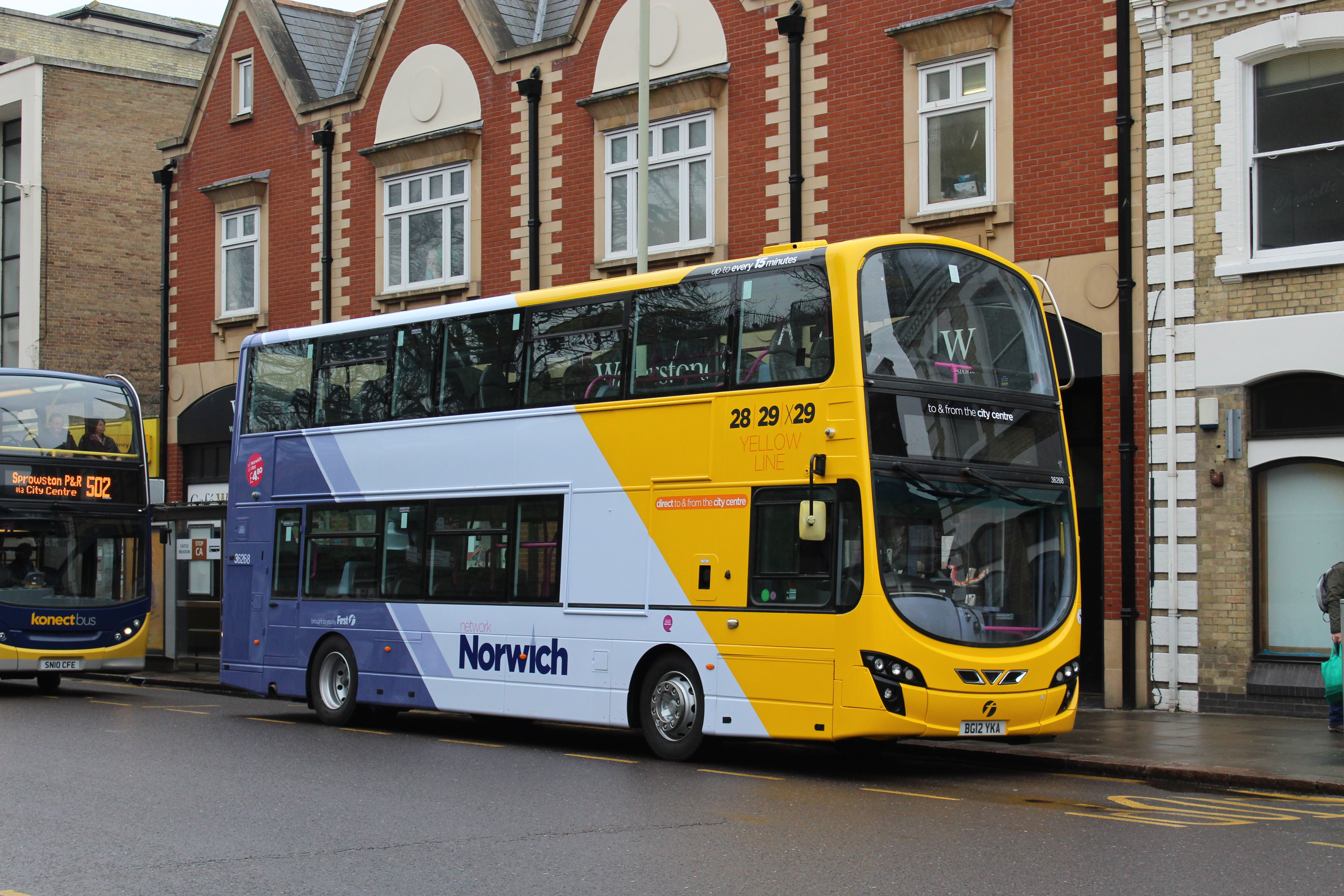
A new Yellow Line bus in Norwich city centre on its first day in service, 27 March 2018.

Between Fakenham and Norwich city centre, the Yellow Line operates every hour during daytimes from Monday to Saturday (with additional buses during the morning and evening peaks), reducing to every two hours on Sundays and bank holidays. The Monday to Saturday daytime frequency increases to every 30 minutes between Thorpe Marriott and the city centre, and every 15 minutes between Taverham and the city centre. Service is provided using Volvo B7RLE/Wright Eclipse Urban Single Deck Buses and Volvo B9TL/Wright Eclipse Gemini 2 Double Deck Buses.

On 3 April 2018, First Norfolk & Suffolk took over service X29 from Stagecoach in Norfolk as a result of Stagecoach ceasing operations in the area. A number of Volvo B9TL/Wright Eclipse Gemini 2 Double Deck Buses have been transferred from First West Yorkshire to cover for the increase in buses required on the Yellow Line, the first of which entered service in new Yellow Line livery on 27 March 2018. The Yellow fronted Plaxton President bodied Volvo B7TLs that were operating on the Yellow Line were withdrawn when these units were transferred. These now carry the lilac-fronted livery, and provide extra capacity on all lines, including the Yellow Line.

=== Purple Line – 36 / 36A / 36B / 37 / 37B / 38 / 39 ===
The Purple Line consists of services 36, 36A, 36B, 37, 37B, 38 and 39. The 37 and 37B start at Mulbarton, the 36 starts at Long Stratton and the 36A starts at Harleston, all to the south of Norwich. The routes run northwards through Lakenham, where they are joined by the 39, and then into Norwich city centre, where the 37B terminates. The routes run through Norwich city centre and out to Mile Cross where the 39 terminates, Ives Road where the 38 terminates, Hellesdon where the 37 terminates and Horsford, where the 36 terminates.

The routes serve Tasburgh, Newton Flotman, Swainsthorpe, Dunston Hall Hotel, Swardeston, Lakenham Homebase and Sainsbury's, Anglia Square shopping centre, the Dixons Centre, Hellesdon Library and Norwich Airport.

From Monday to Saturday daytimes, the Purple Line operates every ten minutes along Aylsham Road, every 15 minutes between Hellesdon and the city centre, every 20 minutes between Mile Cross and Lakenham, and every 30 minutes out to Horsford, Mulbarton and Long Stratton. On Sundays and bank holidays, the frequency decreases to every 30 minutes on all routes. The Purple Line is operated using Volvo B9TL/Wright Eclipse Gemini 2, Volvo B7TL/Plaxton President Double Deck Buses and Volvo B7RLE/Wright Eclipse Urban Single Deck Buses.

The Purple Line was extended on 3 September 2018 with the introduction of new route 36A to Harleston.

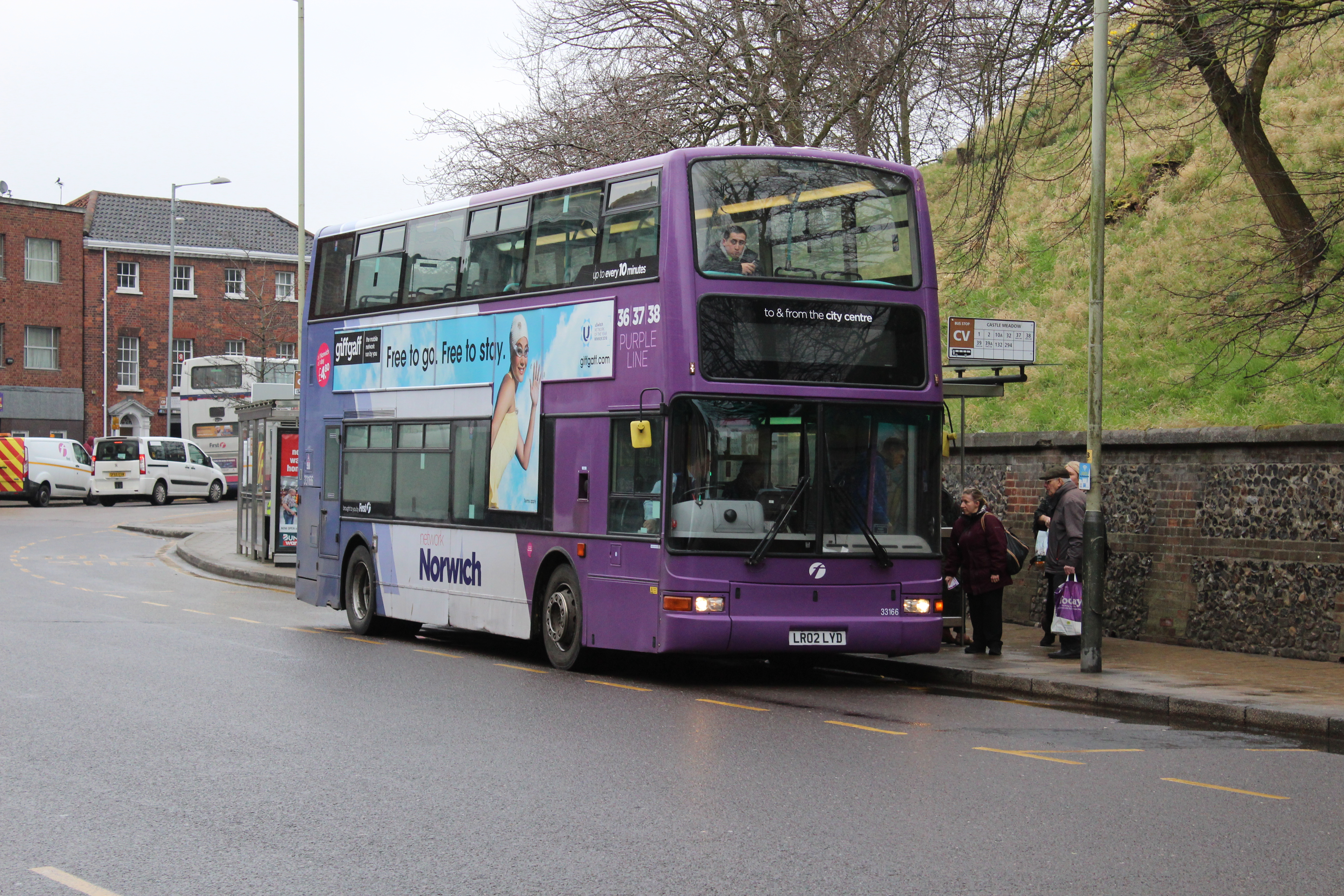
A Purple Line bus in Norwich city centre, March 2018.

=== Charcoal Line – 40 / 40A / 41 / 41A / X41 ===
The Charcoal Line (coloured dark grey) consists of services 40, 41 and X41. Starting in Norwich city centre, the routes run southeastwards through Bracondale, Trowse, Poringland where the 40 terminates, Brooke, Kirstead and Ditchingham, with the 41 terminating in Bungay and the X41 in Halesworth, both in Suffolk.

The route serves City College Norwich, the County Hall at Trowse, Framingham Earl High School, the Nightingale Centre, Bigod's Castle, Bungay Library and the swimming baths in Bungay.

Services operate up to every 15 minutes between Poringland and Norwich city centre from Monday to Saturday daytimes, and up to every hour between Bungay and Norwich city centre, with additional buses provided during the morning and evening peaks. The Charcoal Line is operated using a mixture of Volvo B9TL/Wright Eclipse Gemini 2 Double Deck Buses and a fleet of Wright StreetLite DFs purchased brand new in November 2014.

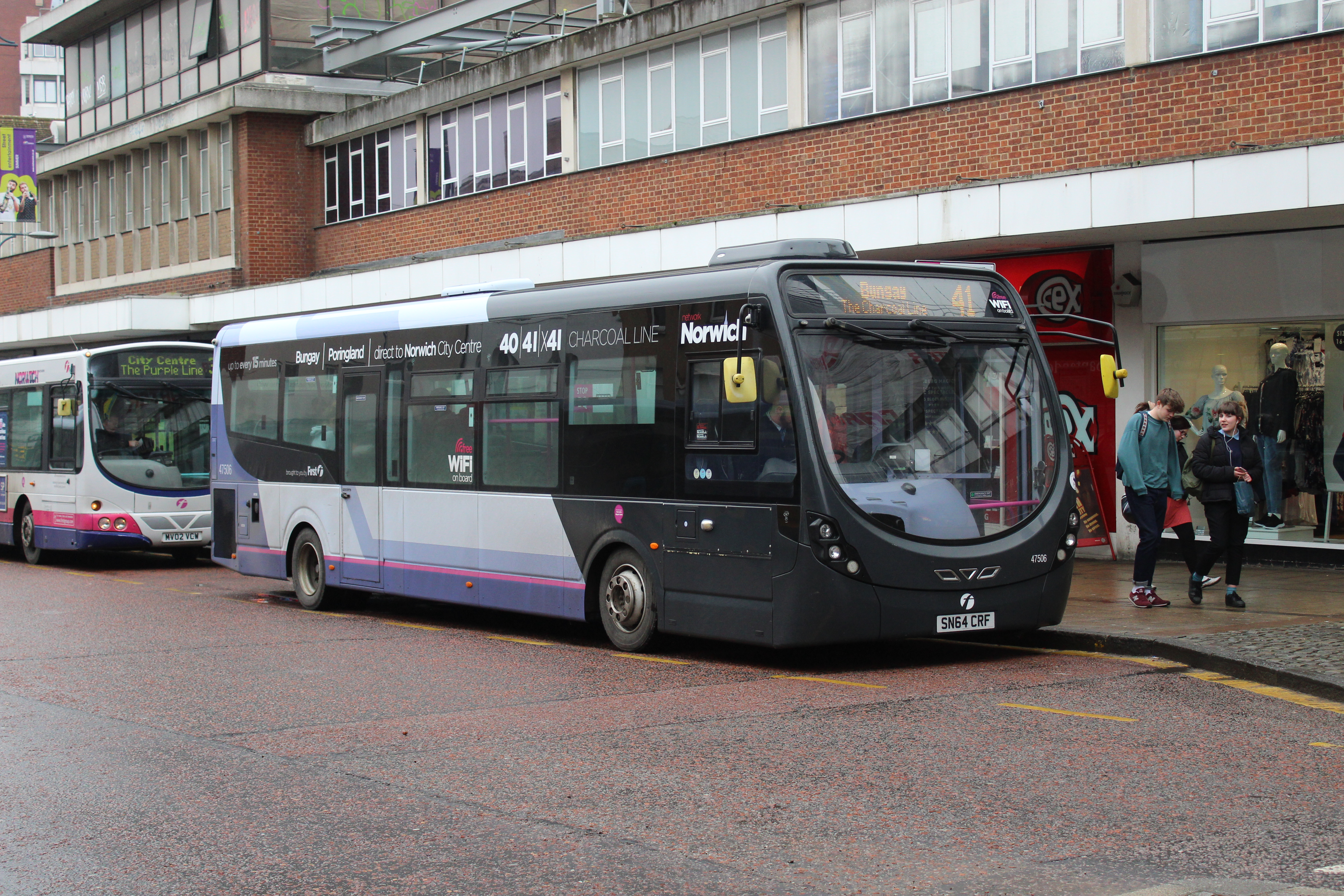
A Charcoal Line bus in Norwich city centre, March 2018.

== Other services ==
=== Excel ===
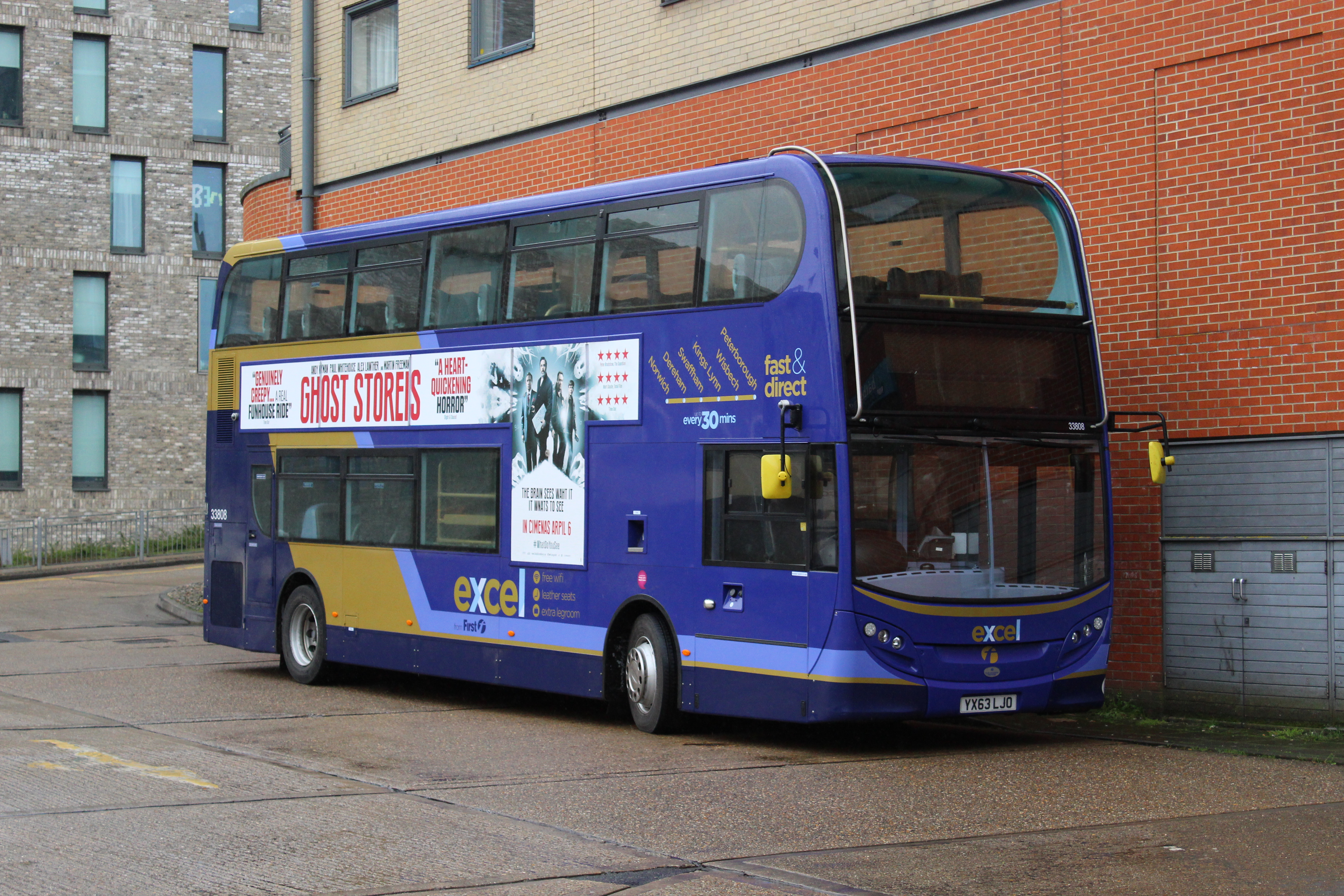
An Alexander Dennis Enviro400 carrying the new excel route branding at Norwich bus station, March 2018

Norwich bus station is a major hub of the Excel bus network operated by First Norfolk & Suffolk, which provides services between Peterborough in Cambridgeshire and Lowestoft in Suffolk. The bus station provides the main interchange point between the western excel route between Peterborough, Wisbech, King's Lynn, Swaffham, Dereham and Norwich, and the eastern X1 route between Norwich, Acle, Great Yarmouth, Gorleston-on-Sea and Lowestoft; originally these two routes operated as one service (X1), but was split in into two routes in July 2014, for operational reasons. Until February 2018 these both operated as X1, but Norwich To Peterborough was rebranded excel to stop confusion between the routes.

Additionally, Norwich provides a hub for various Excel-branded feeder services which serve locations along the eastern X1 corridor, including the X2, X21 and X22 from Norwich to Lowestoft via Gillingham, Beccles, Worlingham, Carlton Colville, North Cove, and Whitton; and the X11 from Norwich to Belton via Acle, Great Yarmouth, Gorleston-on-Sea and the James Paget University Hospital.

=== Unbranded routes ===
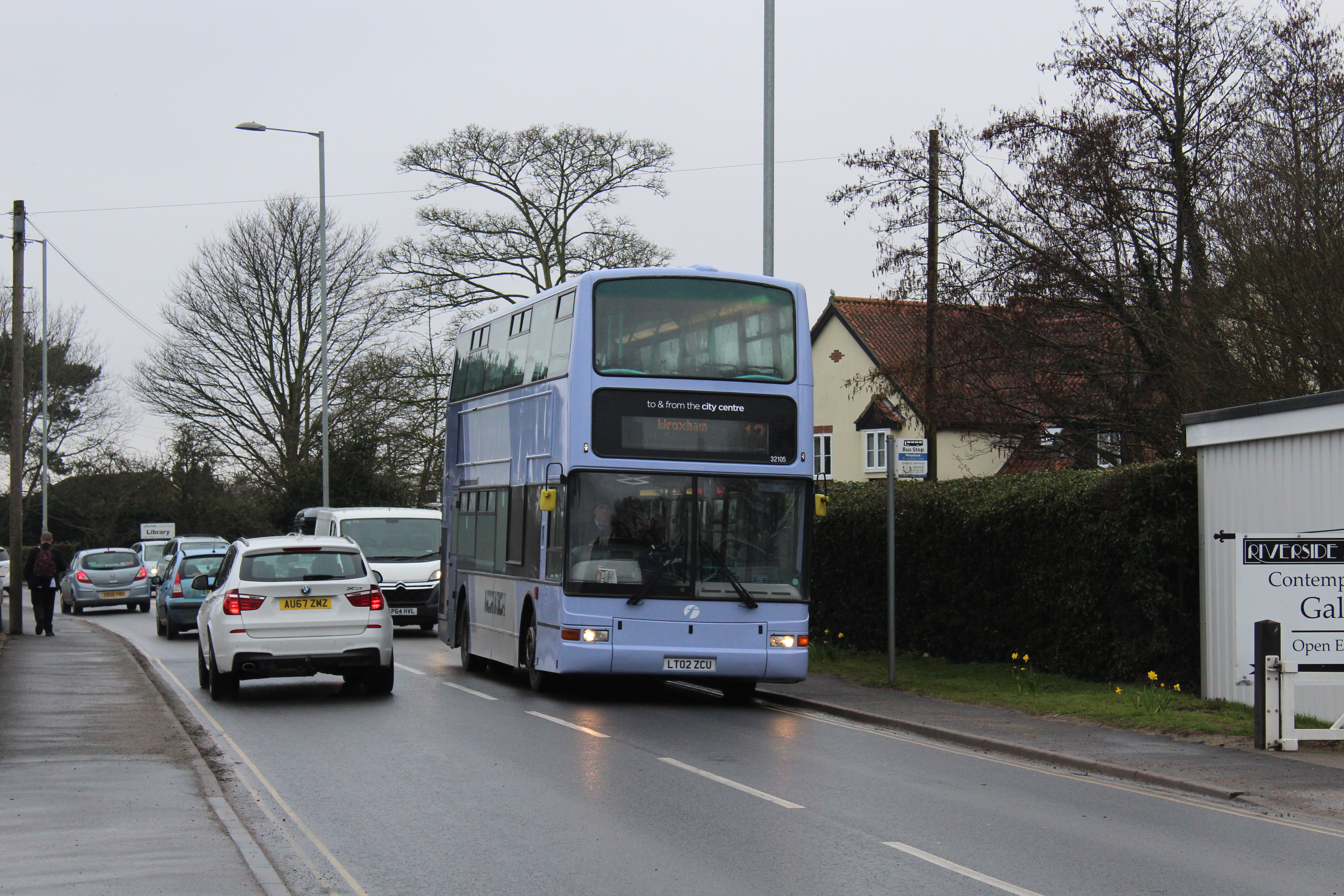
Spare buses are painted in a generic Network Norwich livery with a plain lilac front, and are used on unbranded routes, as well as to provide additional capacity on core services.

Several additional routes are operated by Network Norwich without branding applied, usually as they are infrequent services. Service 30 operates between Norwich city centre, Taverham and Thorpe Marriott, serving the Dixons Centre, Hellesdon Hospital, Sweet Briar Retail Park and Taverham High School.

== Fleet ==
As of 11 January 2024, the Network Norwich fleet consists of 160 buses. This can be broken down into 5 Plaxton President-bodied Volvo B7TLs; 6 Alexander Dennis Enviro400MMCs; 13 Wright Eclipse Gemini-bodied Volvo B9TLs; 41 Wright Eclipse Gemini 2-bodied Volvo B9TLs; 11 Wright StreetLite Maxs; 7 Wright StreetLite DF10.8s; 8 Wright Eclipse Urban-bodied Volvo B7Ls; 10 Wright Eclipse Urban 2-bodied Volvo B7RLEs; 16 Wright StreetDecks; 19 Scania N250UD-bodied Enviro 400 Citys (these are used exclusively for Excel services between Norwich and Peterborough); 17 Wright StreetDeck Electroliners; and 7 training buses. These are all Wright Eclipse Urban-bodied Volvo B7RLEs. First Eastern Counties also have an order of a further 32 Wright StreetDeck Electroliners and 11 Single Deck Wright GB Kite Electroliners.

The Network Norwich fleet is maintained over two Depots on the Ring Road in Norwich. Roundtree Way is close to the Heartsease Estate, and has plans to be fully electric by March 2024. The other, slightly smaller depot is on Vulcan Road, and also houses the training fleet.

=== Heritage buses ===
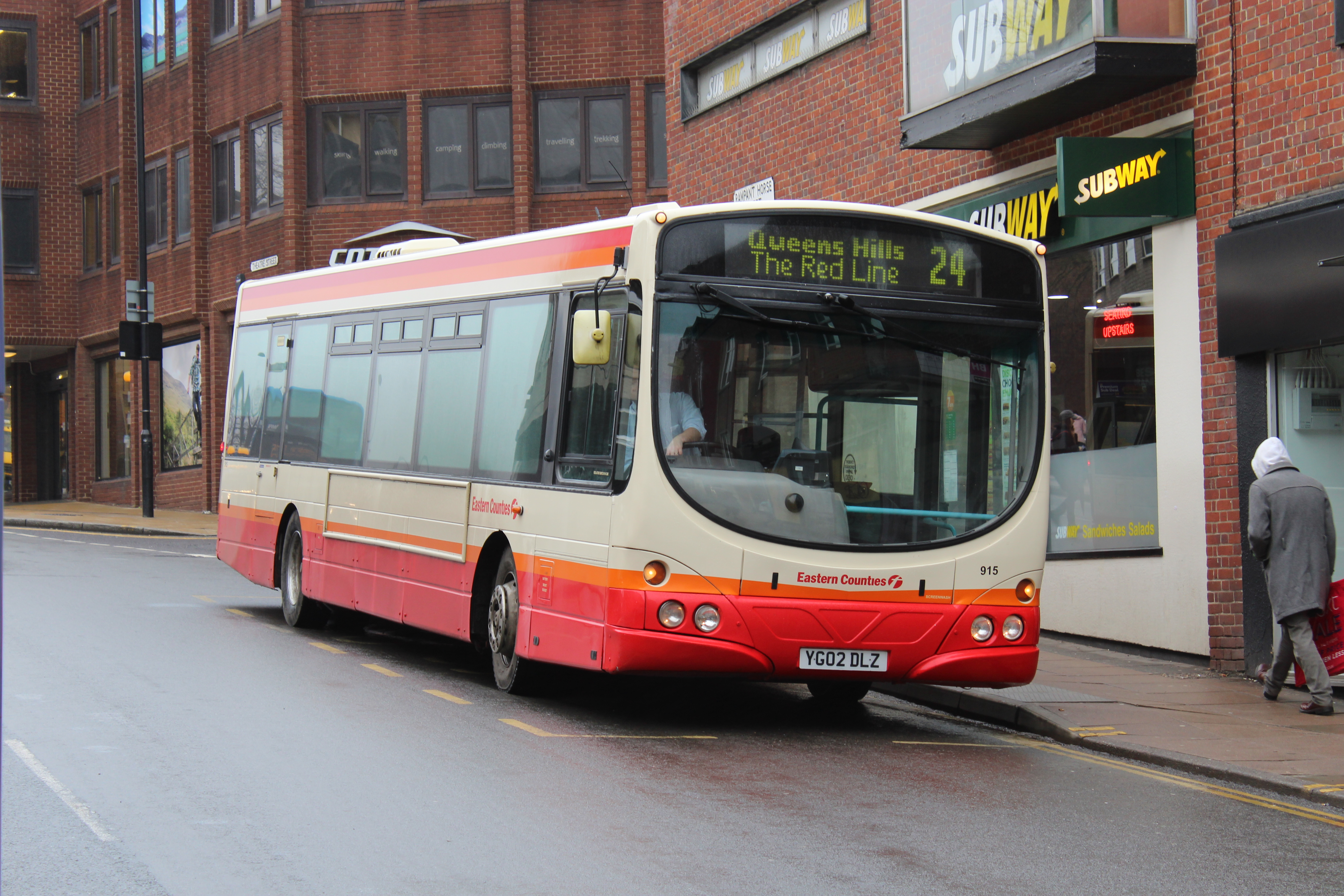
Vehicle 60915, one of two Eastern Counties retro-liveried vehicles in the fleet, in Norwich city centre, March 2018.

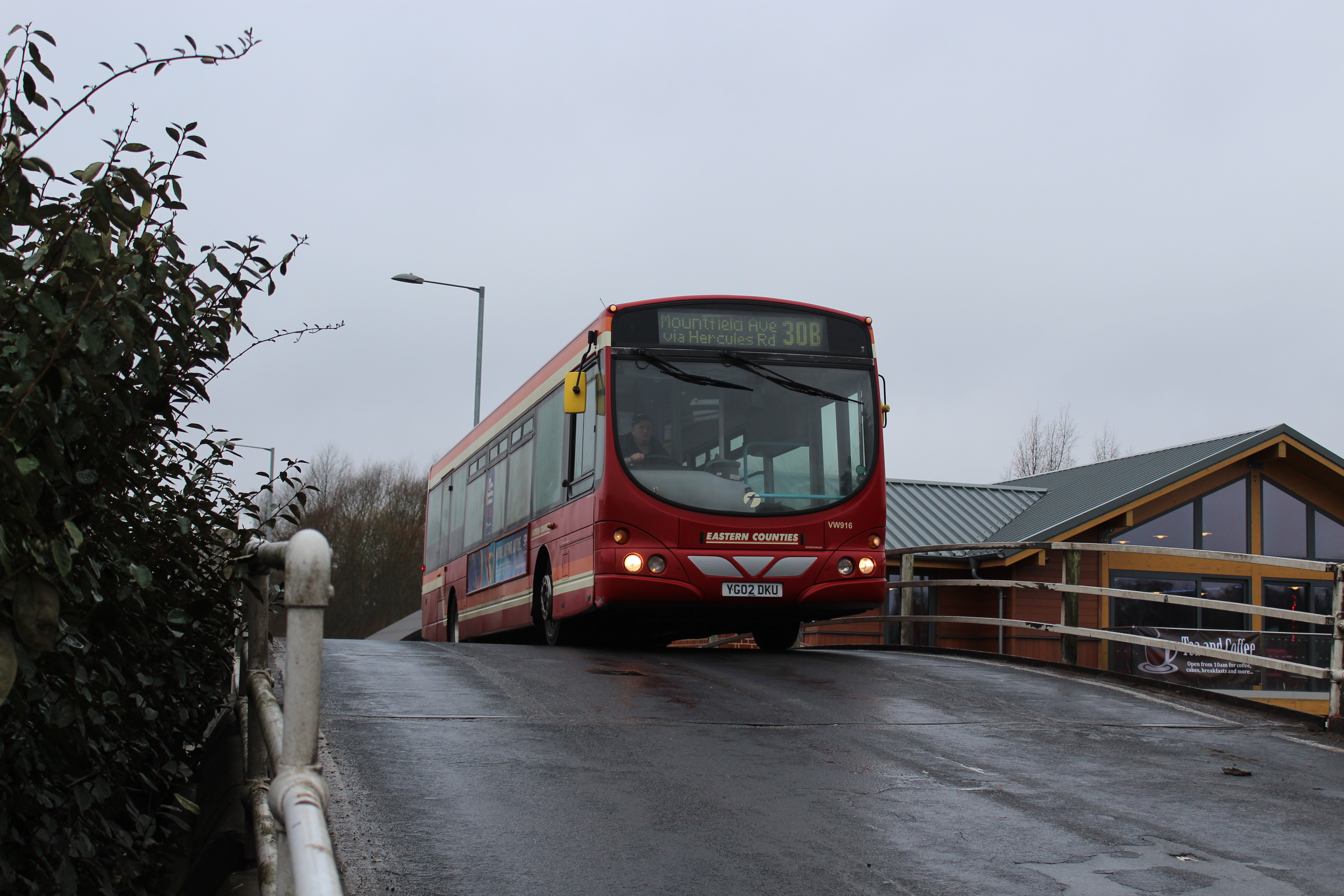
Vehicle 60916, one of two Eastern Counties retro-liveried vehicles in the fleet, crossing the bridge in Wroxham, March 2018.

As of March 2018, Network Norwich had two vehicles painted in retro liveries based on those of the former Eastern Counties bus company, from which Network Norwich (and, by extension, First Norfolk & Suffolk) can trace their history. Both vehicles were Volvo B7L single-deckers with Wright Eclipse Metro bodywork, built in 2002 and originally delivered new to First York and most recently in service with First South Yorkshire before being transferred to Norwich to be repainted into their retro liveries, these have since been scrapped. Recently, a third vehicle has been repainted in a heritage livery. A Volvo B7RLE with Wright Eclipse Urban bodywork, numbered 66985, received the same livery as 60916. In September 2020, another vehicle was transferred to Norwich in a heritage livery from its time in Sheffield; it wears the colours for the Mainline operator.
