= Barry Lewis =

Barry Lewis may refer to:

- Barry Lewis (cook) (born 1982), British cook and author
- Barry Lewis (cricketer) (born 1952), English cricketer
