= RAF Mousehold Heath =

Former RAF station in Norfolk, England

Coordinates: 52°38′36″N 001°20′02″E

RAF Mousehold Heath RFC Mousehold Heath; Mousehold Aerodrome
- Near Norwich, Norfolk in England
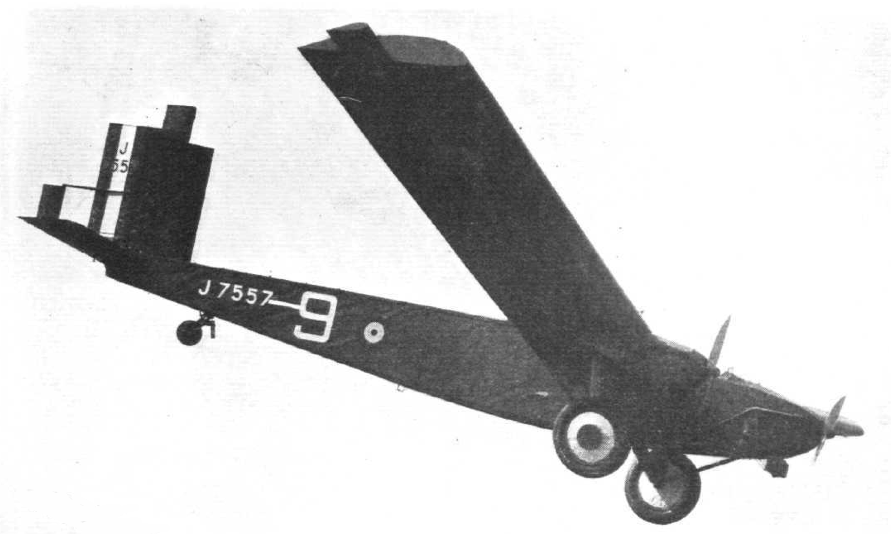
- Beardmore Inflexible aircraft at the Norwich Air Display, Mousehold Aerodrome, May 1929

Site information
- Type: Royal Air Force station
- Owner: Air Ministry
- Operator: Royal Air Force (previously the Royal Flying Corps)

Location
- Shown within Norfolk

Site history
- In use: 1916-1933
- Fate: possible decoy airfield during World War II, sold for private use after the war

Airfield information
Runways
Direction	Length and surface
00/00	Grass

RAF Mousehold Heath was a Royal Air Force station on Mousehold Heath near Norwich. It was originally a Royal Flying Corps training base known as RFC Mousehold Heath. The area between the Salhouse and Plumstead roads (outside of the outer ring road) was originally the Cavalry Training Ground. It was the location where Boulton & Paul, among other local manufacturers, passed over the aircraft they had built into the hands of the RFC. It was sometimes also known as Norwich aerodrome by the RFC On the formation of the RAF in April 1918, it became "Royal Air Force Mousehold Heath".

After the war, Boulton and Paul continued to use the site. The Norwich & Norfolk Aero Club was formed at the airfield in 1927 which then became the first Norwich Airport in 1933. The airfield fell into disuse during the Second World War and has now mostly been redeveloped for housing.

== History ==
Boulton & Paul was a Norwich general construction firm working in metal and wood. In 1915 they approached the government offering their services for production of war materiel. They gained a trial contract for 25 Royal Aircraft Factory FE.2b At the time, an Aircraft Acceptance Park for aircraft being produced in Norfolk was under construction by the War Department near Thetford about 25 miles away. Rather than deliver aircraft there, Boulton & Paul suggested putting an aerodrome on the Cavalry Drill Ground to the north of Norwich. This was accepted and Boulton & Paul gained a contract for the buildings to house an RFC School of Flying on the new aerodrome; No. 9 Reserve Aeroplane Squadron was formed there in July 1915. In October 1915, the first aircraft built by Boulton & Paul, a FE2b serial 5201 and marked "Bombay No.1" flew from Mousehold.

As aircraft output increased the aerodrome was extended, with more buildings built by Boulton & Paul. In 1917, the RFC established Norwich Aircraft Acceptance Park, later named No. 3 (Norwich) Aircraft Acceptance Park at Mousehold to take aircraft from other local manufacturers as well, this included Portholme Aircraft Company, Mann Egerton and Ransomes, Sims & Jefferies. Ransomes based in Ipswich had their aircraft works built by BP and been given BP's jigs and templates for FE2 construction when BP moved to building the Sopwith Camel.

On 26 July 1919 the acceptance park became the Norwich Storage Park.

The following squadrons and units were posted here at some point:

Unit	Dates	Aircraft	Notes
No. 18 Squadron RFC	August–November 1915	Vickers FB 5	Operated the Bristol Scout, Martinsyde S.1 and Farman Shorthorn for training before moving to France in November 1915 with the Vickers FB 5.
No. 37 Squadron RFC	15–16 April 1916		Formed at Norwich from elements of 9 RS before moving on the next day to Orfordness.
No. 85 Squadron RFC	August–November 1917	Various	
No. 117 Squadron RAF	July–November 1918	Airco DH.9	Operated various aircraft for training before gaining the DH.9s in October 1918.
No. 40 Elementary and Reserve Flying Training School RAF	August–September 1939	Miles Magister	Operated by Air Contractors Limited and also used the Hawker Audax and Hawker Hind.
No. 3 (Training) Group Navigation School	July–November 1919	Airco DH.9	

No. 3 Group headquarters was located at Mousehold Heath between July and November 1919.

== Current use ==
Several original buildings remain in industrial use, including hangars and other buildings on the Salhouse Industrial Estate. Part of the flying field survives as the playing field for the Open Academy, formerly Heartsease High School.

== See also ==
- List of former Royal Air Force stations

== Sources ==
- Brew, Alec (1993). Boulton Paul Aircraft since 1915. Putnam. ISBN 0-85177-860-7.
- Jefford, C.G. (1988). RAF Squadrons. Airlife Publishing Ltd. ISBN 978-1-85310-053-6.
- Sturtivant, Ray (2007). RAF Flying Training and Support Units since 1912. Air-Britain. ISBN 978-0-85130-365-9.
