= Stuart Ashen =

British YouTuber and product reviewer (born 1976)

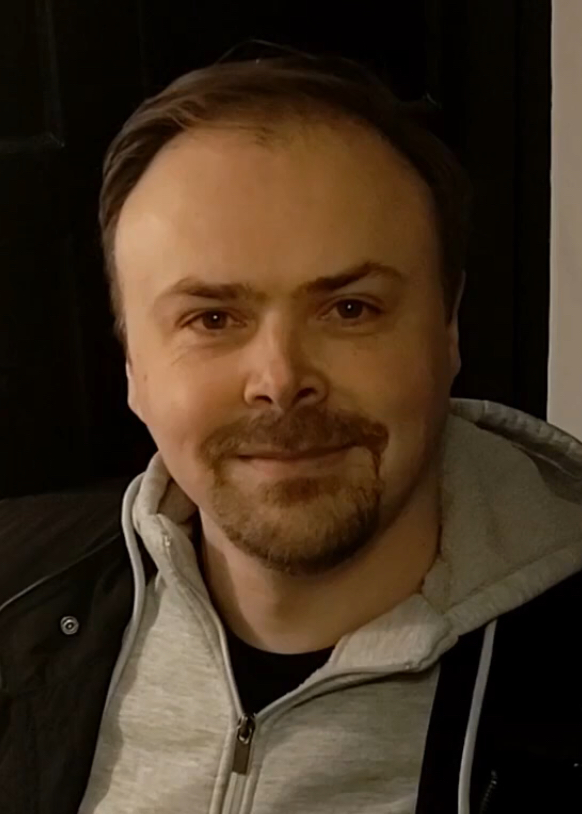
- Ashen in 2019
- Born: Stuart Clive Ashen; 16 December 1976 (age 49); Norwich, England
- Other name: Dr. Ashen
- Education: Doctorate in psychology
- Occupations: YouTuber; critic; comedian; actor
- Years active: 2006–present

YouTube information
- Channel: Ashens
- Genres: Comedy; technology; review
- Subscribers: 1.67 million
- Views: 576 million
- Last updated: 9 September 2026
- Website: ashens.com

Stuart Clive Ashen (born 16 December 1976), better known online as Ashens (/ˈæʃənz/ ASH-ənz), is a British comedian, filmmaker, critic and YouTuber best known for reviewing counterfeit consumer goods. Since 2006, his YouTube videos have centred on examinations and reviews of various, often low-quality, products, including toys, video games and food. His main YouTube channel has more than 1.6 million subscribers.

== Early life and education ==
Stuart Clive Ashen was born on 16 December 1976 and grew up on the Heartsease Estate, Norwich, and attended Heartsease High School. He previously worked for PC World and Norwich Union. His mother, Pauline, died of cancer when he was eight years old.

== YouTube ==
Doctor Ashen (Dunc's Algomusic MkIIIb)
The intro music used by Ashen in most of his YouTube videos from June 6, 2008, onwards.

Ashen has been reviewing food and various products in a distinctive style on YouTube since 2006. The items he reviews are often low quality and procured from various variety stores (notably Poundland), or are poor knockoffs of well-received or well-known products, which he refers to as "tat". Featured products are typically personally sourced by Ashen in the UK or during holidays abroad or submitted by viewers. Almost all of Ashen's videos are filmed in his home, showing only his living room couch and his hands that are holding and pointing to the products he is reviewing, while his face is rarely seen by the viewer.

He frequently collaborated with his friend and fellow YouTube vlogger Barry Lewis, and in the mid-2010s had a podcast and YouTube channel with him, both called Barshens.

As of 16 September 2026, Ashen has produced 969 videos on his primary YouTube channel, which has 1.67 million subscribers and more than 576 million video views. His secondary channel, used mainly for DVD extra style clips, along with an annual look with Daniel Hardcastle at a series of Advent calendars throughout December, has more than 317,000 subscribers and more than 66 million video views. In addition to his own channels, he has also produced videos for other YouTube channels, including "The Multiverse", a geek-themed channel controlled by ChannelFlip.

In 2013, Ashen, along with Emma Blackery, Daniel Howell (danisnotonfire) and Phil Lester (AmazingPhil), starred as a contestant in a remake of the 1980s television programme Knightmare during the YouTube Geek Week event.

== Television ==
Ashen made his first television appearance on a 2008 episode of Charlie Brooker's Screenwipe, where he played a cameo role as Mr. Noseybonk, a character from the 1980s BBC children's show Jigsaw.

Ashen guest-starred on The Armstrong & Miller Show for their "The Node" segment in October 2009. In early 2009, Ashen also released a very limited edition DVD anthology dubbed Ashenthology, containing a selection of his early videos as well as some unseen videos and animations; some of these videos were later released on his second YouTube account, extraashens.

In 2010, Ashen created the series Ashen's Tech Dump for BBC Online Comedy. In 2011, he co-starred alongside Karen Hayley in another BBC Online Comedy series, Back Space. The next year, he starred as himself in The Proxy, a sci-fi web series produced by ChannelFlip in partnership with Dell Alienware. The series took eight days to film, consists of 10 episodes and won a Marketing Week "Engage Award" in the "Gaming and Entertainment" section.

== Film ==
=== Ashens and the Quest for the GameChild ===
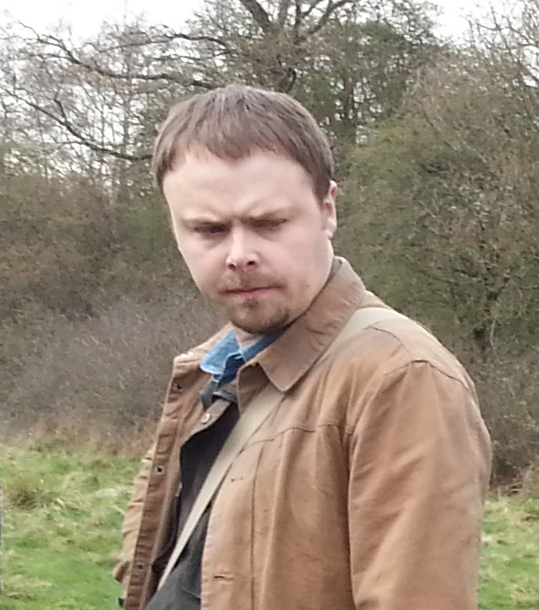
Ashen on the set of Ashens and the Quest for the Game Child (2013)

Ashen wrote and starred in Ashens and the Quest for the GameChild, a feature film released in August 2013, for YouTube's "Geek Week". The film also stars Warwick Davis and Robert Llewellyn, and was produced by the multi-channel network ChannelFlip in association with The Multiverse. The film was partially paid for through crowdfunding website Indiegogo with contributions totalling US$73,690 at the end of the month, which comprised 41% of the US$180,000 budget. As of June 2016 it has been viewed more than a million times on YouTube. A remastered and slightly extended edition of the movie was released on DVD and Blu-ray on 14 July 2014. On 2 July 2018, the full film was released on his YouTube channel.

=== Ashens and the Polybius Heist ===
In 2016, Ashen confirmed a sequel to Ashens and the Quest for the GameChild at a fan screening. In July 2018, he created another Indiegogo campaign for the sequel titled Ashens and the Polybius Heist. By the time funding was closed, the project earned more than US$195,000 from more than 4,000 backers. On 9 May 2019 he announced the principal photography was wrapped. On 5 May 2020 it was announced on the official Twitter account for the film that The Gaming Muso, a fellow YouTuber and a musician, would be performing the opening theme tune for the film. On 9 October 2020 Ashen announced on Twitter that the film is available for preorder, and was released on 19 November 2020 on iTunes, YouTube Movies, Amazon and Vimeo. The reveal trailer/teaser was uploaded on his YouTube channel on 14 October 2020.

=== Turn Back ===
In October 2023, Ashen announced that a currently ongoing Kickstarter campaign had been launched for a new horror film about the demonic hound Black Shuck, who features in English folklore.

== Published works ==
In November 2015, Ashen released the book Terrible Old Games You've Probably Never Heard Of, a collection of textual reviews of poor retro games, released through the Unbound crowdfunding platform. The book reached its funding target in 12 hours.

On 24 February 2017, Ashen announced a sequel to Terrible Old Games You've Probably Never Heard Of, titled Attack of the Flickering Skeletons: More Terrible Old Games You've Probably Never Heard Of, again through Unbound, and it was released on 2 November 2017.

Ashen released the book Fifty-Thousand Shades of Grey on 23 September 2012; it parodies the popular erotic novel Fifty Shades of Grey. The title is literal, as the book simply consists of the phrase "Shades of Grey" used 50,000 times.

== Personal life ==
As of 2013, Ashen lives in his home town of Norwich. He has a doctorate in psychology, but he has never worked in the field. Ashen is the cousin to Ian Harvey, who appeared on the television series Robot Wars, a relation mentioned in Ashen's own YouTube content.

== Bibliography ==
Year	Title	Notes
2012	Fifty-Thousand Shades of Grey	Parody of Fifty Shades of Grey
2015	Terrible Old Games You've Probably Never Heard Of	
2017	Attack of the Flickering Skeletons: More Terrible Old Games You've Probably Never Heard Of	sequel to Terrible Old Games You've Probably Never Heard Of
2019	Fuck Yeah, Video Games: The Life & Extra Lives of a Professional Nerd by Daniel Hardcastle	Contributor
2020	Things I Learned from Mario's Butt by Laura Kate Dale	Contributor
2021	Fact Hunt: Fascinating, Funny and Downright Bizarre Facts About Video Games by Larry Bundy Jr.	Contributor

== Filmography ==
=== Web series ===
Year	Title	Role	Notes
2010	Ashen's Tech Dump	Himself, lead role	Five episodes over two series
2011	Back Space	Himself	Six episodes
2012	The Proxy	Himself, lead role	Ten episodes
2013–2014	Ideas Men	Himself	Nine episodes over two series plus Series One and Two Bloopers
2013	Knightmare	Himself, dungeoneer	Special online one-off episode
2013	Geek Week Special	Himself	Single episode, panelist
2018	Digitiser: The Show	Himself, Insincere Dave	

=== Television ===
Year	Title	Role	Notes
2008	Charlie Brooker's Screenwipe	Mr Noseybonk	Cameo appearance, one episode
2009	The Armstrong & Miller Show	Himself	Guest star, one episode
2015	Newsnight	Himself	Interviewee, one episode
2024	The Golden Cobra	Dr. Goode, Alan Yentob, Newsreader, Narrator	Voice actor, six episodes

=== Film ===
Year	Title	Role	Notes
2013	Ashens and the Quest for the GameChild	Himself, lead role	Co-writer
2016	The Darkest Dawn	Bob	
2020	Ashens and the Polybius Heist	Himself, lead role	Co-writer, sequel to Ashens and the Quest for the GameChild
2015	Sariel	Father Adrian Servo	
TBA	Turn Back		Co-writer
