= Diocese of Norwich Education and Academies Trust =

- Founded: 28 February 2013
- Type: multi-academy trust
- Registration no.: 8737435
- Location: Diocesan House, 109 Dereham Road, Easton, Norwich, NR5 9ES
- Website: www.dneat.org

Diocese of Norwich Education and Academies Trust is a multi-academy trust, serving schools in the Diocese of Norwich, in Norfolk and the Waveney Valley. These are predominantly former Church of England village primary schools.

== Primary academies ==
- Brisley Church of England Primary Academy
- Castle Acre Church of England Primary Academy
- Cawston Church of England Primary Academy
- Colkirk Church of England Primary Academy
- Dereham Church of England Junior Academy
- Ditchingham Church of England Primary Academy
- Flitcham Church of England Primary Academy
- Gayton Church of England Primary Academy
- Gillingham St Michael's Church of England Primary Academy
- Gooderstone Church of England Primary Academy
- Great Witchingham Church of England Primary Academy
- Hockering Church of England Primary Academy
- Hopton Church of England Primary Academy
- Kessingland Church of England Primary Academy
- Little Snoring Community Primary Academy
- Middleton Church of England Primary Academy
- Moorlands Church of England Primary Academy
- Mundford Church of England Primary Academy
- Narborough Church of England Primary Academy
- Peterhouse Church of England Primary Academy
- Rudham Church of England Primary Academy
- Sandringham and West Newton Church of England Primary Academy
- Sculthorpe Church of England Primary Academy
- Sporle Church of England Primary Academy
- St Michael's Church of England Academy
- St Peter & St Paul Church of England Primary Academy
- St Peter's Church of England Primary Academy
- Swaffham Church of England Junior Academy
- The Bishop's Church of England Primary Academy
- Thomas Bullock Church of England Primary Academy
- Weasenham Church of England Primary Academy
- West Raynham Church of England Primary Academy
- Whitefriars Church of England Primary Academy

== Secondary academies ==
- Open Academy, Norwich
