= Daniel Hardcastle =

British YouTuber and author (born 1989)

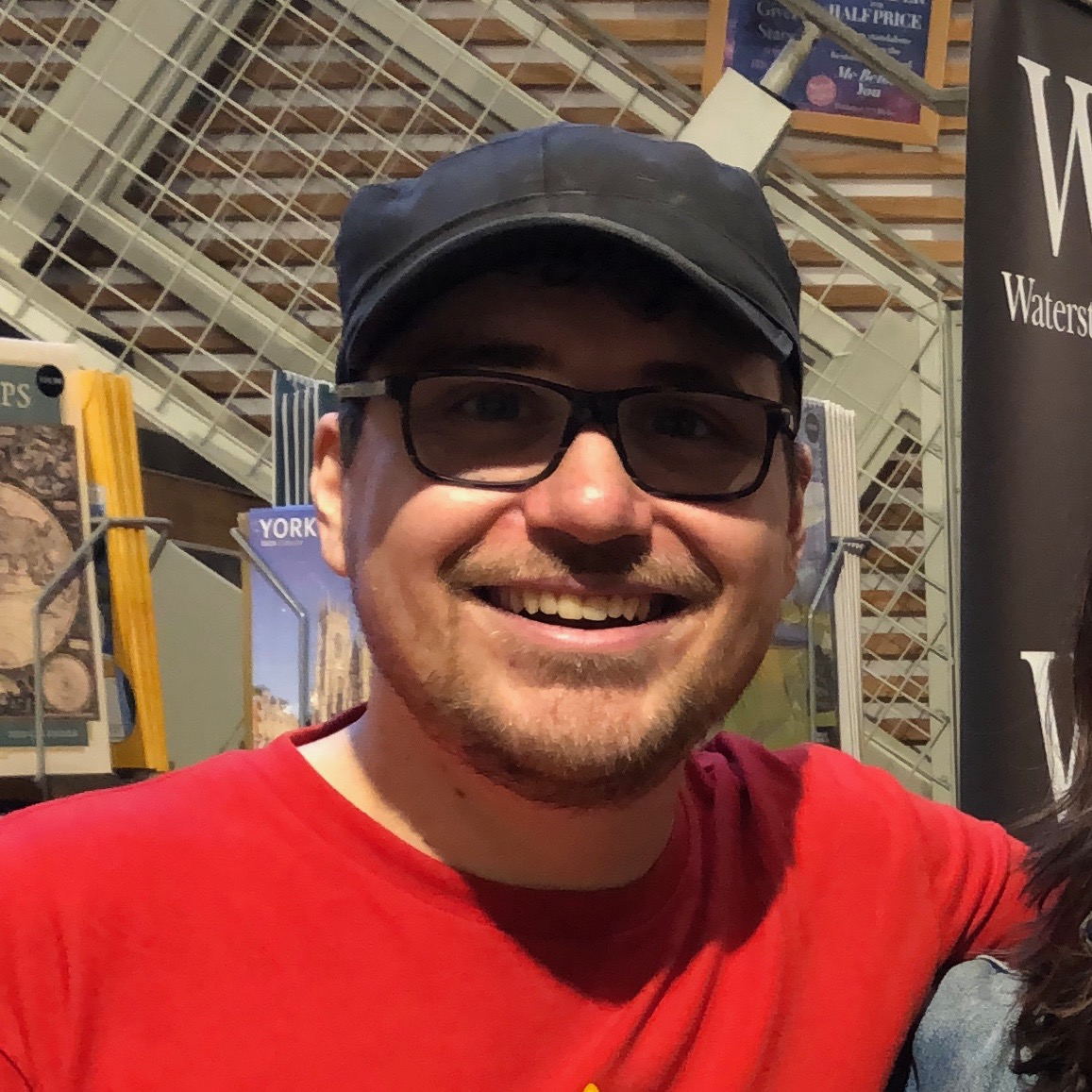
- Hardcastle at a book signing in 2019
- Born: Daniel John Hardcastle; 23 March 1989 (age 37); Essex, United Kingdom
- Occupations: Author; Actor; YouTuber
- Years active: 2009–present
- Spouse: Rebecca Maughan (m. 2016)

YouTube information
- Channel: NerdCubed
- Genres: Let's Play; comedy
- Subscribers: 2.39 million
- Views: 1.37 billion
- Last updated: 6 December 2024
- Website: www.nerdcubed.co.uk

Daniel John Hardcastle (born 23 March 1989), known online as NerdCubed (stylised as Nerd^{3}), is a British YouTuber, author and actor. Created in 2011, his YouTube channel primarily consists of video game-related content. As of December 2024, it has approximately 2.39 million subscribers and 1.37 billion video views. He is the author of The Sunday Times bestseller Fuck Yeah, Video Games: The Life and Extra Lives of a Professional Nerd, and The Paradox Paradox. In 2025 he became a writer for Doctor Who, writing an audio story in partnership with Big Finish Productions.

== Career ==
=== Online ===
Hardcastle rose to prominence through a scripted, story-based webcomic created within Minecraft. After creating his YouTube channel on 20 March 2011, Hardcastle initially uploaded a series of comedic vlogs before he uploaded his first let's play. His first let's play series, called Nerd³'s Minecraft Buildy Thing, ran from 27 August 2011 to 22 August 2012. After creating videos on a few indie games, Hardcastle uploaded his first Nerd³ Plays video on 7 January 2012. In 2012, Machinima sponsored him to create the series 13 Ways To Die.

In 2015, Hardcastle was nominated for a Golden Joystick Award for "online personality of the year". He has since amassed more than 2.44 million subscribers and 1.34 billion total views. On Red Nose Day 2019, Hardcastle raised over £16,000 for Comic Relief over the course of an 11-hour livestream.

=== Film ===
In 2020, Hardcastle starred in the film Ashens and the Polybius Heist alongside his longtime collaborator Stuart Ashen, who also co-wrote the film. Hardcastle himself also holds a small writing credit for the film, having written two jokes into it when Ashen gave him the script. Hardcastle will also be starring in Ashen's film Turn Back.

=== Books ===
Hardcastle began writing his first book, Fuck Yeah, Video Games: The Life & Extra Lives of a Professional Nerd, in 2017. On 4 June 2018, he started crowdfunding the book through the website Unbound. The book reached 100% of its target on the first day and 1000% by 11 June. Reaching a total of 1903% of its initial goal, the book is the most successful crowdfunded book in the United Kingdom. The foreword of the book was written by founder of Double Fine and game director Tim Schafer, and another chapter was contributed by YouTuber Stuart Ashen. The book was released on 19 September 2019 and was a The Sunday Times best seller.

On 26 September 2019, crowdfunding began for Hardcastle's second book, The Paradox Paradox, a science fiction novel which he described as "a bit Star Trek, a bit Doctor Who, and a bit fucked up." The book achieved its funding goal within 20 minutes. The eBook was released early for backers on 15 December 2024, which at the time was being labelled as a thank you for waiting five years for the story. However, Hardcastle later revealed it was due to the imminent bankruptcy of Unbound and the uncertainty of when the book would be available to readers, with the physical hard cover eventually releasing five months later on 17 April 2025. Unbound filed for bankruptcy, in January 2025, with an attempt made by the same founders to restructure the company as Boundless Publishing, but the company entered liquidation in August 2025. A total of 238 authors were affected by this, and they would not receive any of their remaining owed contracted payments for their books. Hardcastle made a video on the topic, explaining many management failures and a lack of communication, resulting in at least £40,000 in withheld revenue, unauthorised 85%-off sales, and misallocated funding for a paperback that Hardcastle wasn't told about. He stated that "we've lawyered up, both individually, and in groups of authors".

=== Audio Stories ===
On 28 February 2025, Hardcastle announced that he had written a short Doctor Who story for Volume 13 of the Big Finish Short Trips. Hardcastle's story, 'Rise of the Eukaryans', which features the Eleventh Doctor and is read by Laura Aikman, is one of six short stories in Short Trips Volume 13: Tales from the Vortex releasing on 30 April 2025.

== Personal life ==
Hardcastle is married to Rebecca Maughan, an artist who illustrated Fuck Yeah, Video Games.

Hardcastle's father, Steve "Dad³" Hardcastle, with whom he has regularly collaborated, started a YouTube channel in 2013; it accumulated more than 300,000 subscribers and 23 million total views. He retired from making videos on 5 February 2024.

Hardcastle studied astrophysics at the University of Leicester, but dropped out after the first year.

== Bibliography ==
=== Fiction ===
Hardcastle, Daniel (2025). The Paradox Paradox. Unbound. ISBN 9781800183520.

=== Nonfiction ===
Hardcastle, Daniel (2019). Fuck Yeah, Video Games: The Life and Extra Lives of a Professional Nerd. Unbound. ISBN 9781783527878.

== Filmography ==
=== Film ===
Year	Title	Role	Notes
2020	Ashens and the Polybius Heist	Cube	Additional Written Material

=== Audio ===
Year	Title	Role	Notes
2025	Rise of the Eukaryans	Writer	Produced by Big Finish Productions
