= Barry Lewis (cook) =

British cook, author and YouTuber (born 1982)

- Born: Barry Conrad Lewis; 15 July 1982 (age 44); Bristol, England
- Other name: My Virgin Kitchen
- Occupations: Cook, author, actor
- Years active: 2010–present
- Spouse: Rebecca Lewis (née Gardner) (m. 2014)
- Children: 2

YouTube information
- Channel: Barry Lewis
- Genre: Cooking
- Subscribers: 996 thousand (Barry Lewis); 101 thousand (Barshens)
- Views: 222 million (Barry Lewis); 18 million (Barshens)
- Last updated: 1 January 2023
- Website: BarryLewis.net

Barry Lewis (born 15 July 1982) is a British cook, author and founder of the YouTube channel, Barry Lewis (formerly "My Virgin Kitchen"), which, as of June 2023, has over 996,000 subscribers.

A self-taught cook, Lewis began filming recipe attempts online from his home in Weston-super-Mare in 2010 after he saw Jamie Oliver on a television show. After being signed up by Oliver to appear on his YouTube channel, Lewis attracted media coverage. His cookbook, Dinner's On, was published in May 2014 and a second, My Virgin Kitchen – Delicious Recipes You Can Make Every Day, in August 2017.

In January 2019, the My Virgin Kitchen YouTube channel was renamed to Barry Lewis.

== Career ==
Lewis set up My Virgin Kitchen as a way to inspire himself to learn to cook. He was working at the time as a quantity surveyor for Wates Group and would make recipe videos in the evenings in an attempt to gain confidence in the kitchen.

Each video consists of Lewis cooking a recipe for the first time to inspire others to do the same; hence the name 'virgin kitchen.' Over time his reluctance to cook slowly began to turn into a passion, and a broad range of cooking videos were uploaded including simple dinners, cooking with kids and stunts such as cooking using hair straighteners. In 2013, Lewis was discovered online by the man who originally inspired him, Jamie Oliver. Lewis decided to take a sabbatical from his job to take his cooking passion further as a career.

Lewis also started making videos with fellow YouTube personality Stuart Ashen, with most videos being Ashen's food specials, which are either reviewing foods of certain themes, or looking at (and sometimes eating) out-of-date food. In February 2016, Ashen and Lewis created a joint channel called Barshens.

Lewis has written two cookbooks, and has appeared on television shows including Channel 5's The Gadget Show testing barbecues, and ABC's Nightline, as well as appearances at food festivals.

Lewis has appeared as an actor in 'Ashens and the Polybius Heist' as 'Chef Assistance', marking his first appearance in a feature film as an actor.

== Bibliography ==
- Dinner's On, HarperCollins, 2014 ISBN 9780007544592
- My Virgin Kitchen-Delicious Recipes You Can Make Every Day, HarperCollins, 2017

== Personal life ==
Barry is married to Rebecca (Becky), referred to as Mrs. B in the videos. They have two daughters, Phoebe & Chloe and a pug, Boston.
