= Open Academy =

Location
- Salhouse Road; Norwich, Norfolk, NR7 9DL; England
- Coordinates: 52°38′41″N 1°19′38″E

Information
- Type: Academy
- Religious affiliation: Church of England
- Established: 2008
- Trust: DNEAT
- Department for Education URN: 135650 Tables
- Ofsted: Reports
- Principal: Jon Ford
- Gender: Coeducational
- Age: 11 to 18
- Houses: Challenge, Destiny, Inspiration, Respect
- Colours: Black and Turquoise
- Website: http://www.open-academy.org.uk/

Open Academy (formerly Heartsease High School) is a secondary school with academy status located in the Heartsease area of Norwich, in the English county of Norfolk.

== History ==
The academy was first formed in September 2008, replacing Heartsease High School and housed in the buildings of the former school, the Open Academy moved to new buildings in September 2010. It is a Church of England school that is sponsored by the Bishop of Norwich and businessman Graham Dacre.

== Description ==
The school offers GCSEs, BTECs and vocational courses as programmes of study for its pupils. The school has a specialism in environmental science and offers courses geared towards the specialism.

=== Key Stage 3 ===
All schools in England are obliged to the National Curriculum, and are encouraged to teach Progress 8 subjects. Open Academy chooses to spend three years on Key Stage 3. All classes except for Maths are taught in mixed ability. German is the modern foreign language. Students and their parents can download a knowledge organiser each year.

=== Key Stage 4 ===
In Year 10 and 11, for Key Stage 4, students study the core subjects of English (Language and Literature) Mathematics, Science, PE and Personal, Social, Health, Citizenship and Economic Education (PSHCEE). This Core curriculum occupies 30-hours of lessons per fortnight, with four pathway subjects filling the remaining 20-hours per fortnight.

=== Sixth form (Key Stage 5) ===
Open Academy was formerly a part of the Kett Sixth Form College consortium, which also includes Sprowston Community High School and Sewell Park College. The Kett operates as a separate entity to its host schools. As of 2013, the Academy gained a separate Sixth Form, to be known as OA6 . OA6 is a small, but growing Sixth Form, offering a variety of A-Levels and BTECs.

- BTEC Art and Design
- BTEC Level 3 Extended Diploma in Sport
- A Level Maths, Physics, Chemistry
- A Level Biology, Psychology
- A Level History, English Literature

== Notable former pupils ==
=== Heartsease High School ===
- Stuart Ashen, actor and YouTube personality/reviewer
