= Anglia Square =

Defunct shopping mall and cinema in Norwich, England

Coordinates: 52.6363°N 1.2952°E

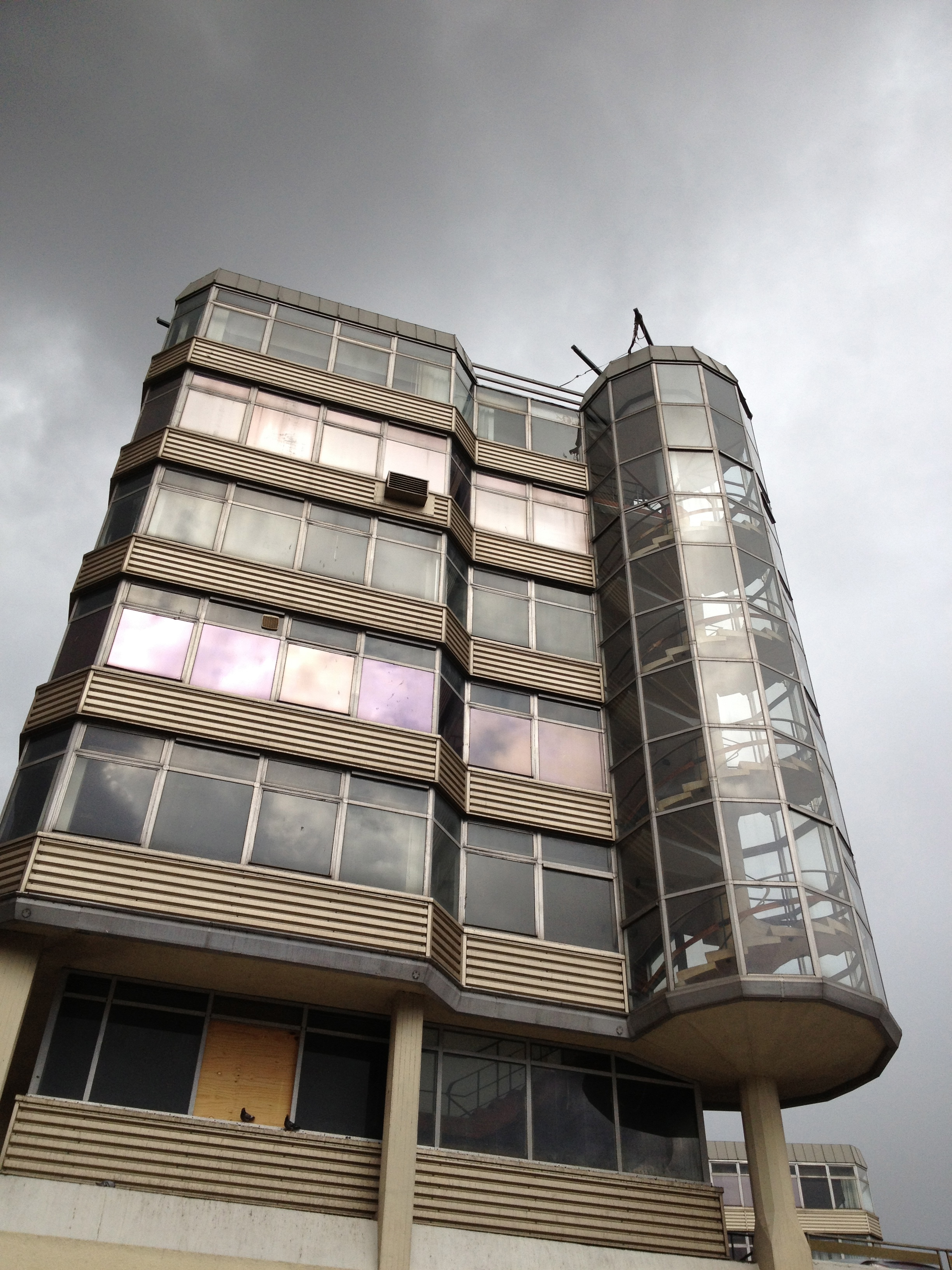
- Spiral staircase on Sovereign House in Anglia Square
- Location: Norwich, Norfolk, England
- Opened: July 1970; 56 years ago
- Closed: November 2025; 1 year ago
- Developer: Alan Cooke & Partners
- Owner: Norwich City Council
- Floors: 2

Anglia Square was a shopping centre in the north of Norwich city centre, in Norfolk, England. Opened in 1970, it was part of a larger Norwich redevelopment during this period, which was also complemented by the establishment of the nearby HMSO building, Sovereign House, which opened in 1969. The square took six years to build, but was never actually finished.

Pedestrian shop-lined walkways lead onto Anglia Square which was originally open to the elements but is now partially covered by a steel and glass structure – added in the late 20th century. The red brick and concrete buildings are finished in the brutalist style. Forming the western boundary of the centre was the former HMSO building, Sovereign House, before its demolition in 2026.

In 2014, the centre was bought by investment manager Threadneedle Investments for £7.5 million. In early 2018, Weston Homes and landowner Columbia Threadneedle submitted regeneration plans for the site, which included a controversial 25-storey tower block, but due to intervention, subsequent plans reduced the height to 20-storey. The updated plans were rejected in 2020 by the secretary of state, Robert Jenrick. Subsequently, in April 2021, the developer announced it would work on new proposals for the site; The revised plans were approved by the city council in April 2023, but these plans were later scrapped in February 2024 when the developer pulled out of the project.

In December 2024, Norwich City Council purchased Anglia Square with grant funding from Homes England and demolition work commenced in November 2025. Once the site is demolished, plans are in place to build over 1000 new homes, along with new retail and office spaces.

The Lost Medieval Church of St Olave’s, Anglia Square, Norwich

A piece of Norwich’s history worth preserving

Anglia Square is not just a modern shopping and redevelopment site. Beneath and around it lies a fascinating part of Norwich’s history, including the remains of a medieval church believed to date back almost 1,000 years.

One of the most important historic sites connected with Anglia Square is St Olave’s Church, which was dedicated to the Norwegian King Olaf. Historical evidence suggests that a church existed here from around the 10th or 11th century, during a time when Norwich had a thriving Anglo-Scandinavian community.

The beginnings of St Olave’s

St Olave’s was dedicated to King Olaf, also known as Olaf II of Norway, who died in 1030 and was later made a saint. The church is believed to have been built around this period, making it potentially older than the Norman Conquest of England in 1066.

The church once stood near what is now Pitt Street and St Crispin’s Way. It served the local community for centuries, with a churchyard surrounding it.

What happened to the church?

Like many smaller medieval churches in Norwich, St Olave’s eventually fell out of use during the religious changes of the 16th century.

It was demolished in 1546. Its churchyard and surrounding area changed over time, and later buildings were constructed on the site.

However, parts of its history may have survived in the buildings that came afterwards.

The remarkable discovery

In 2022, local heritage experts identified unusual flintwork within an old building at Anglia Square. They believed that some of this masonry could have belonged to the original medieval church or its retaining wall.

Archaeological evidence from earlier investigations also found burials in the area believed to have been part of St Olave’s churchyard.

This makes the site particularly important because it may preserve physical evidence of Norwich’s early medieval community.

== History ==
=== Stump Cross and Botolph Street ===
The area where Anglia Square stands today was part of the Saxon settlement of Norwich, which was defended by Anglo-Scandinavian defensive ditches running along what is now Botolph Street and Anglia Square car park. Magdalen Street and St Augustine's, which are two of the oldest streets in Norwich, date back to those times. During the 19th century, a Crepe Manufactory – a factory which produced a fabric often worn when mourning, was built where Anglia Square now stands. The area was badly bombed during the Baedeker raids in April 1942, during World War II and the area was deemed suitable for post-war development.

=== Redevelopment ===
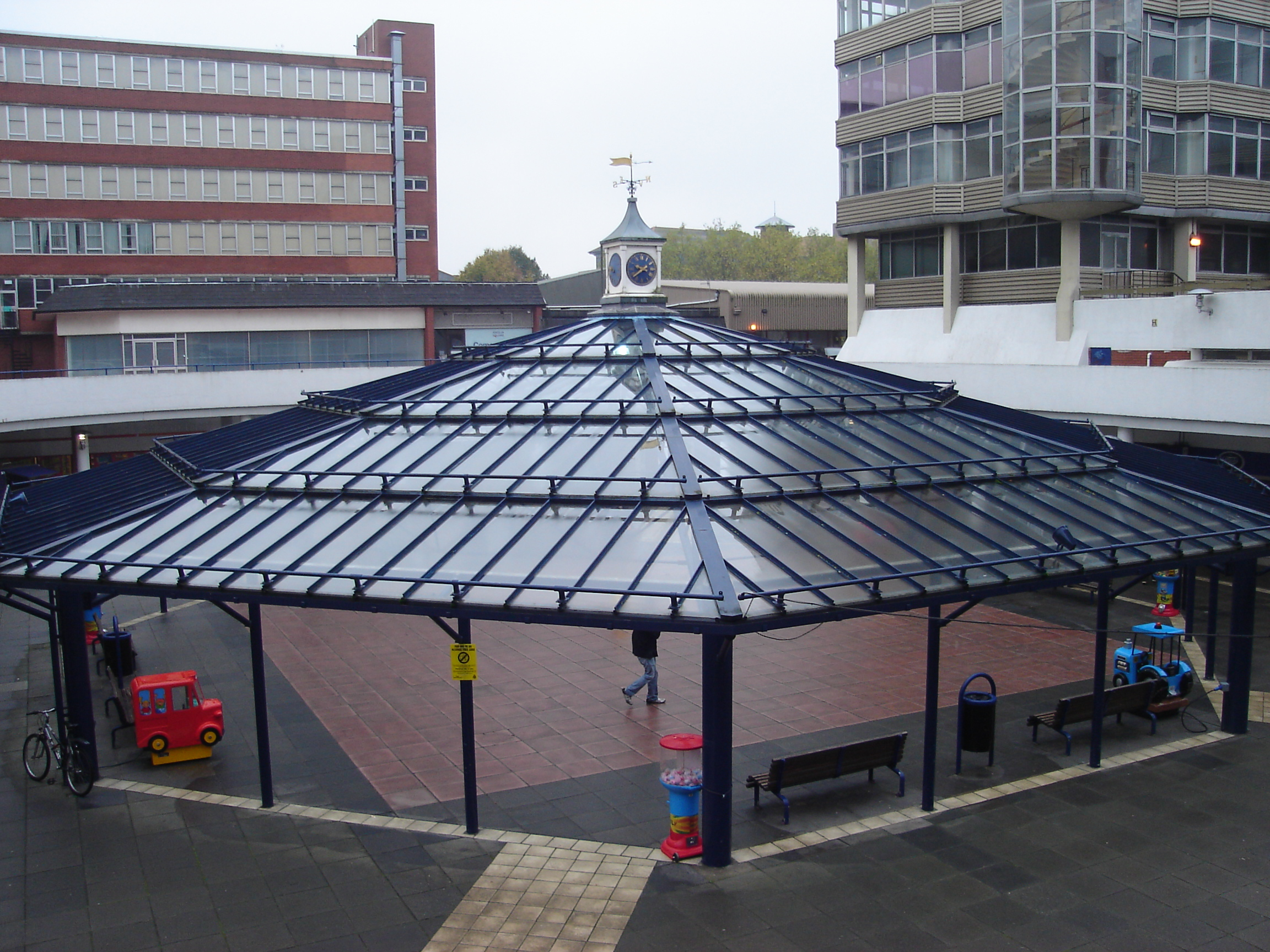
The square

The 1945 Norwich Plan, prepared for the city council by C.H. James, Rowland Pierce and Norwich City Engineer H.C. Rowlet, envisioned an urban dual carriageway encircling the city centre, creating ambitiously titled “gates” (aka roundabouts) at every major intersection. Although it was unrealised in its entirety, the western and part of the northern sides of this ring road became the Inner Link Road, constructed between 1968 and 1975.

Many historic buildings were cleared in the making of Anglia Square and the subsequent inner-ring road. One of the oldest was the Kings Arms public house on Botolph Street, which on its gable end in large iron characters were the letters "I" and "C" and the date "1646", now preserved in one of the Norwich museums. Also demolished was the Regency bank at the junction of Magdalen Street and Botoph Street, some other Georgian and Victorian buildings along St George's Street, that survived the war bombings, as well as gabled and jettied Tudor buildings. The cleared areas near where The Shuttles pub stood were never built on, and remain an empty wasteland today.

The centre was designed by Alan Cooke & Partners who handled the whole development.

== Facilities ==
=== Shops ===
The single storey shops included discount supermarkets and a wide range of privately owned and high street stores. The covered square featured a selection of street stalls.

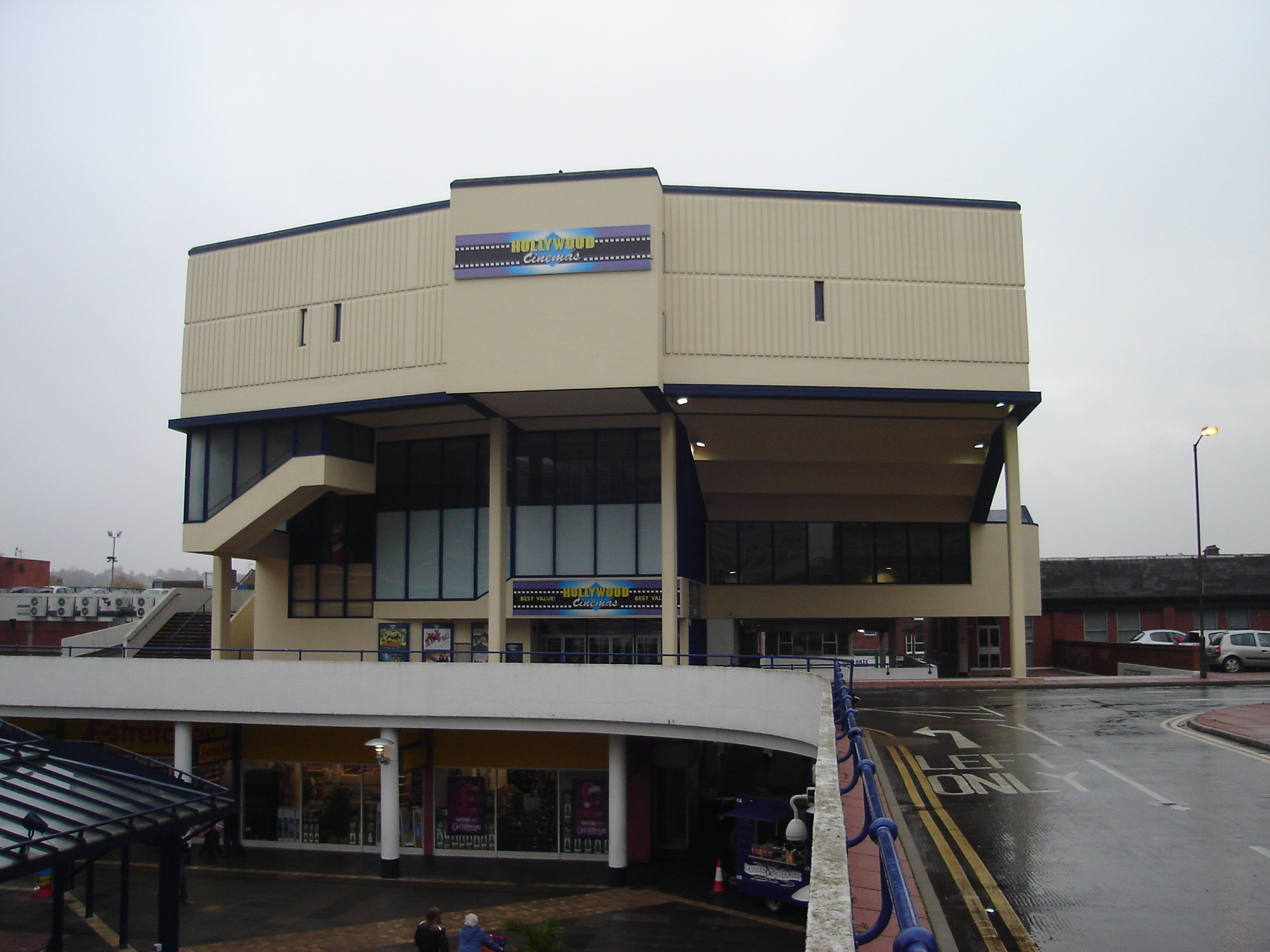
The cinema

=== Cinema ===
Built on a concrete raft and rising above the centre was the former Odeon cinema which opened on 8 July 1971, replacing a nearby 2,000 seat pre-war cinema. Later part of the local Hollywood Cinemas chain, in July 2013 the cinema hosted the world premiere of Alan Partridge: Alpha Papa following an "Anglia Square Not Leicester Square" campaign. In 2019, the cinema closed permanently.

== Proposed regeneration ==
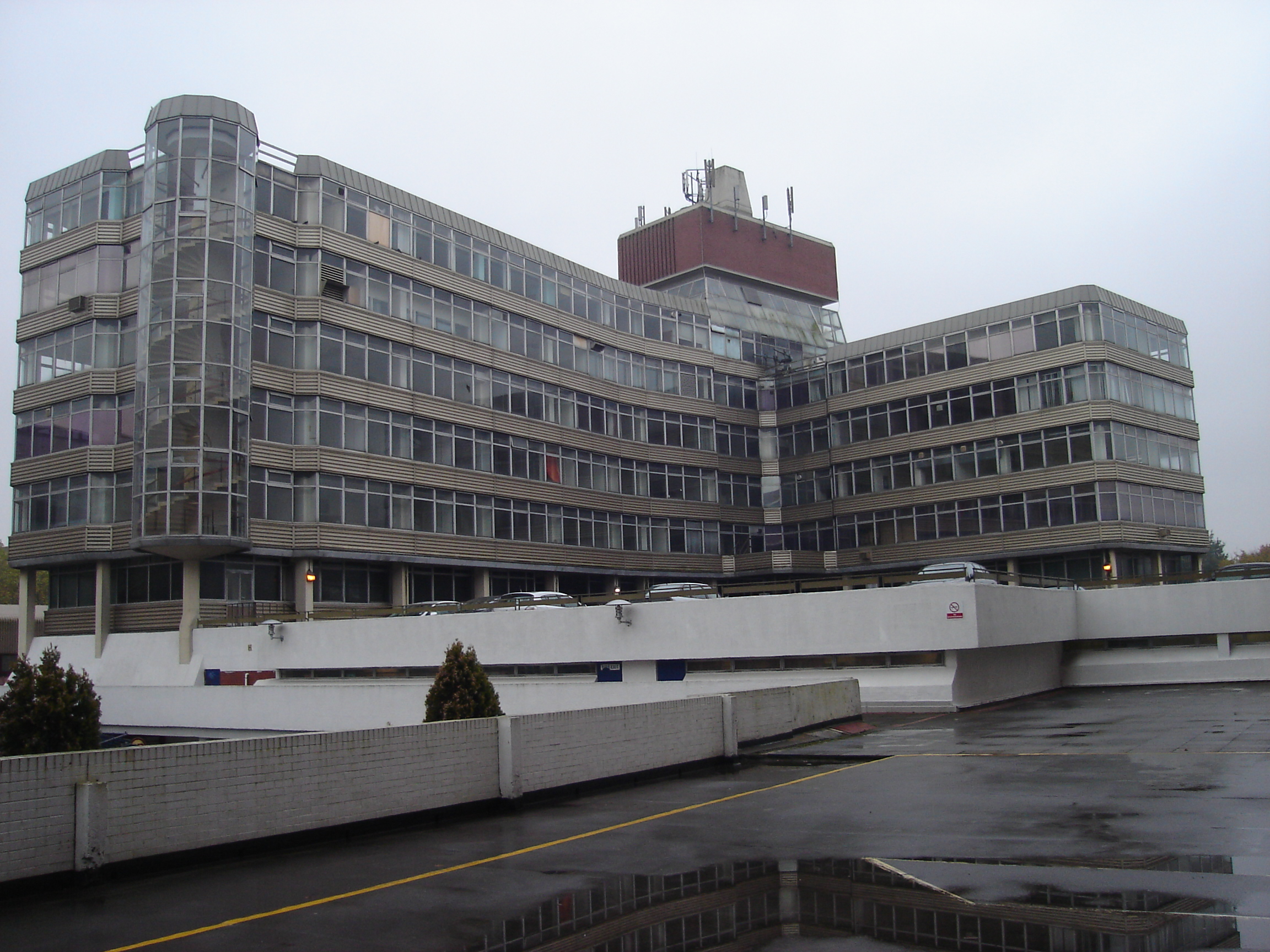
Sovereign House. HMSO building

Anglia Square and the surrounding area were intended to be the centre of a major redevelopment, with a suggested name of Calvert Square (Calvert Street is nearby). During 2008, the public were invited to view the proposals. Work was due to start in 2009 but plans were scaled down due to the credit crunch. The multimillion-pound plans were to be part of the Northern City Centre Area Action Plan. In January 2011, new plans for the square were lodged and the developers hoped to gain approval before the end of April 2011

In 2014, after the previous developers failed to begin any redevelopment, the centre was bought by investment manager Threadneedle Investments for £7.5 million. Threadneedle, and their partner Weston Homes, announced in November 2016 they have been holding talks with chief officers at Norwich City Hall over redevelopment plans. Plans submitted included the demolition of Anglia Square, the former stationery office and Gildengate House, with more than 1000 homes to be built above shop units and a new public square.

By early 2018, the regeneration plans for the site were submitted. These include 1200 homes, of which 120 would be affordable, a major supermarket, hotel, green squares and central courtyards, along with a 20-storey tower. The project was opposed by Historic England, civic watchdog the Norwich Society and the Dean and Chapter of Norwich Cathedral. The plans were rejected but later revised in 2023, which were approved by the council despite concerns over the affordability of the housing. The plans were estimated to cost £300 million. However, in February 2024, Weston Homes announced it had pulled out of the project and the plans were subsequently scrapped.

== Demolition ==
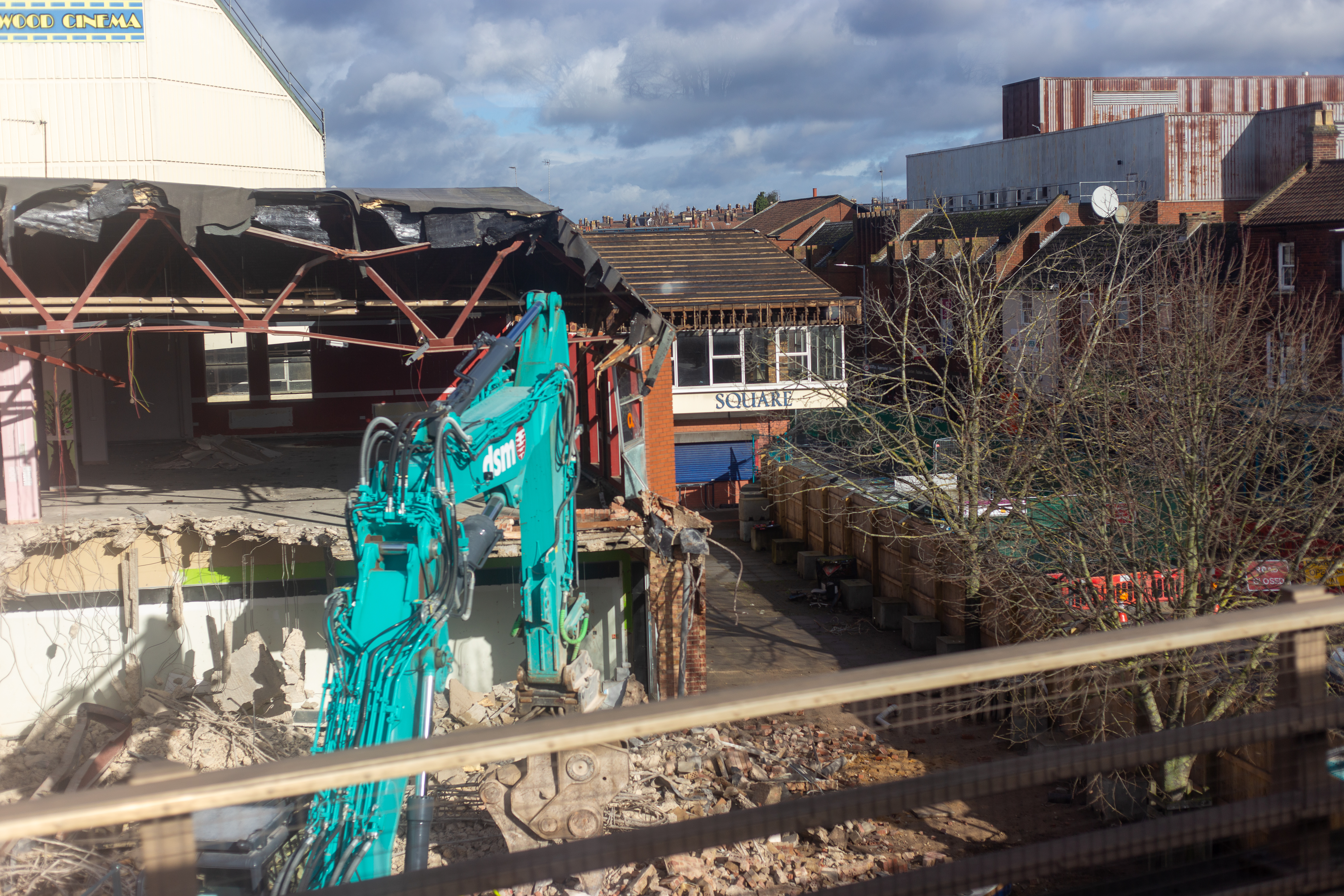
Anglia Square being demolished in February 2026

In December 2024, Norwich City Council announced that they had purchased Anglia Square for £5.6 million, via grant funding from Homes England and investment from Aviva Capital Partners, and unveiled new regeneration plans for the site. The plans include the building of 1,100 new homes - mostly flats - as well as new retail and office spaces. Its estimated cost is £350 million.

After the last shop left the site in May 2025, demolition commenced in November that year. In February 2026, the multi-story car park came down, and the following month, demolition of the cinema began. Demolition was originally scheduled to be completed by spring 2026, but work was delayed by urban explorers, nesting birds, and the discovery of asbestos. In September, human remains were discovered which were believed to belong to a medieval cemetery, and by the end of the month, demolition work had commenced on Gildengate House. Sovereign House was torn down in October.

== Gallery ==
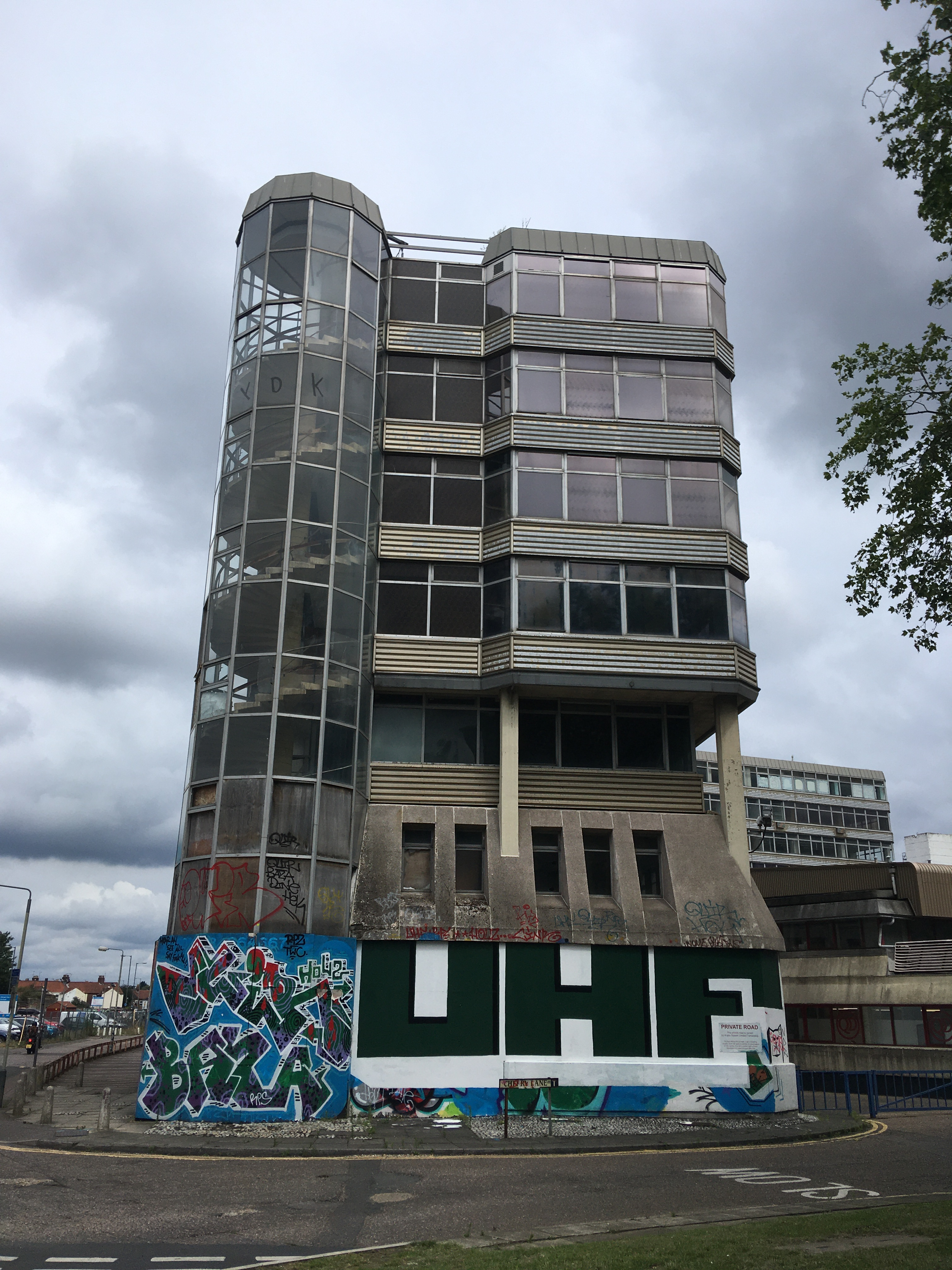
Sovereign House

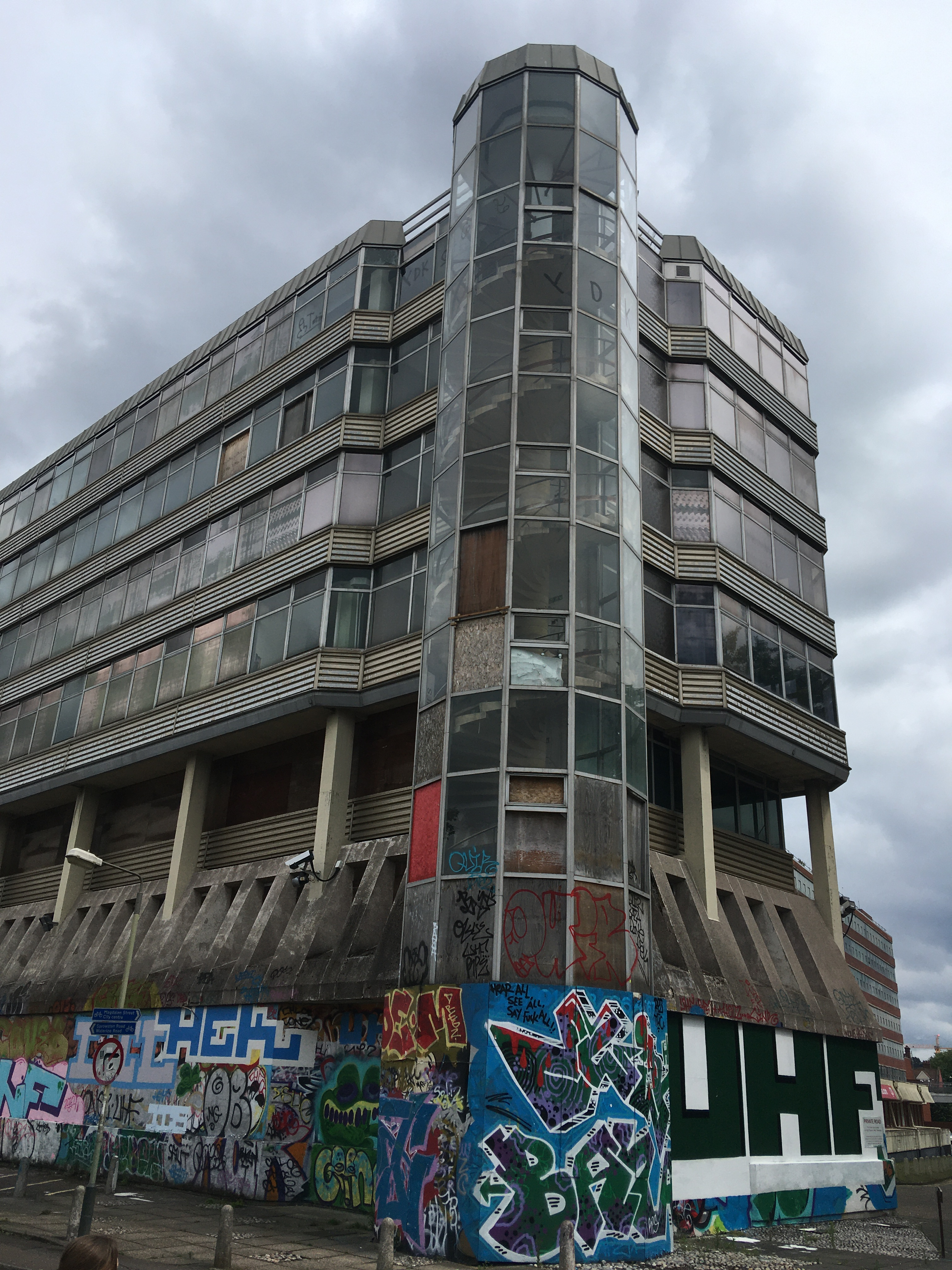
Sovereign House
