= Heartsease Estate, Norwich =

Housing estate in Norwich, Norfolk, England

Coordinates: 52.643°N 1.334°E

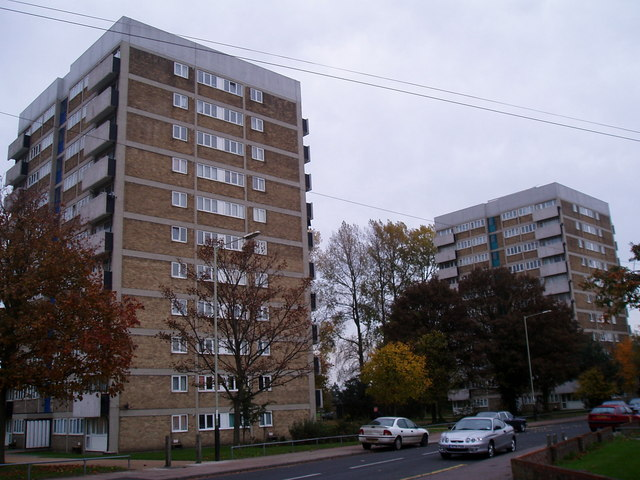
Tower blocks on the estate

The Heartsease is a housing estate located in Norwich, Norfolk and takes its name from the heartsease, a common European wild flower.

== Location ==
The estate is approximately 2.5 miles (4.0 km) north-east of the city centre and is bounded by Heartsease Lane to the west, Woodside Road to the east, Plumstead Road B1140 and Salhouse Road form the southern and northern boundaries respectively.

== History ==
Heartsease estate was originally agricultural land close to Mousehold Heath. At the beginning of the 20th century it was used by the Norfolk Regiment as a drill ground. In October, 1914 it was taken over by the Royal Flying Corps to become RAF Mousehold Heath. By 1933, it became the first Norwich Airport, however by WW2 it had fallen into disuse. Several local companies manufacturing aircraft were based at the aerodrome including Boulton and Paul.

Work began building the estate after WW2 and was completed by the mid-1950s. Much of the housing is terraced, mixed with two-storey blocks of flats and maisonettes. With the addition of three tower blocks built in the 1960s and some infilling in the subsequent years.

== St Francis church ==
The church is dedicated to St Francis of Assisi and was designed by J P Chaplin and opened in 1957. Located in the centre of the estate at Rider Haggard Road, the church frontage is adorned with a bronze sculpture depicting St Francis.

== Schools ==
Heartsease High School was part of the original design for the estate and was later replaced by the Open Academy which relocated to new buildings in September 2010 at the cost of £21 million.

== Amenities ==
Amenities on the estate included shopping parades, two churches, schools, pub (closed) and essential services.

== Notable people ==
- Stuart Ashen, comedian, reviewer of mostly low-quality products, writer, actor, animator and internet personality.
