= Park and ride bus services in the United Kingdom =

Bus service for non-central car parking

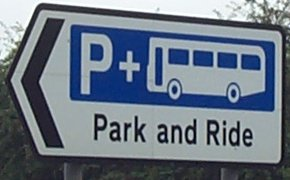
A road sign directing car drivers to an Oxford park and ride site. It combines the UK standard symbols for a public car park and a public bus service.

Park and ride bus services in the United Kingdom are bus services designed to provide intermodal passenger journeys between a private mode of transport and a shared mode bus. The common model of bus based park and ride model is transfer from a private car to a public transport bus, although schemes may also be used by pedestrians and cyclists.

"Park and ride" commonly refers to permanent schemes operated as part of the public transport system, for onward transport from a permanent car park to an urban centre. ‘Park and ride bus’ can also be used to describe temporary and seasonal schemes, services operated for private or specialised users, and services that do not necessarily serve an urban centre. Bus services can be permanent, seasonal, or only operate on specific days of the week, or for specific events.

Permanent public transport based park and ride sites are predominantly constructed, administered and financially supported by one or more of the local public authorities, although partial private funding also occurs, usually in partnership. Since bus deregulation in 1986, the actual bus service for particular schemes is currently operated by one or more private bus operators, or stand-alone companies, with the contract to operate the bus service being put out to commercial tender. An exception is Northern Ireland, where the state concern Translink promotes and operates all public transport park and ride schemes.

Schemes are often specially marketed with a specific brand separately from other standard local bus services. Public transport schemes mostly operate at a net loss, with the budgetary cost justified by the reduction in traffic congestion and reduced need for central parking spaces. The net benefits of park and ride schemes to the environment have been questioned in studies examining the effect of schemes on overall vehicle mileages and passenger travelling behaviour.

Implementation of public transport park and ride bus services in the UK accelerated through the 1980s and 1990s, although some schemes have failed or been scaled back due to lack of use. Permanent schemes range in size from an allocated area with provision of less than 10 cars, to multiple dedicated sites catering in total for nearly 5,000 cars. Schemes predominantly serve a single town or smaller city, while rail based mode, where it exists, is the predominant implementation for the larger metropolitan areas. Larger regional bus schemes exist, such as at Ferrytoll in Fife, Scotland and in Northern Ireland.

== History ==
Permanent bus based park and ride schemes are most often found in the UK in historical towns and cities where the narrow streets mean traffic congestion hits hardest and streets cannot easily be widened. An example is Oxford, which operated the first scheme in the UK, initially with an experimental service operating part-time from a motel on the A34 in the 1960s, and then on a full-time basis from 1973. Large scale adoption in other towns then continued from the 1980s with increased car ownership. As of 2005 there were 92 park and ride sites across 40 locations in England.

== Permanent schemes ==
=== Implementation ===
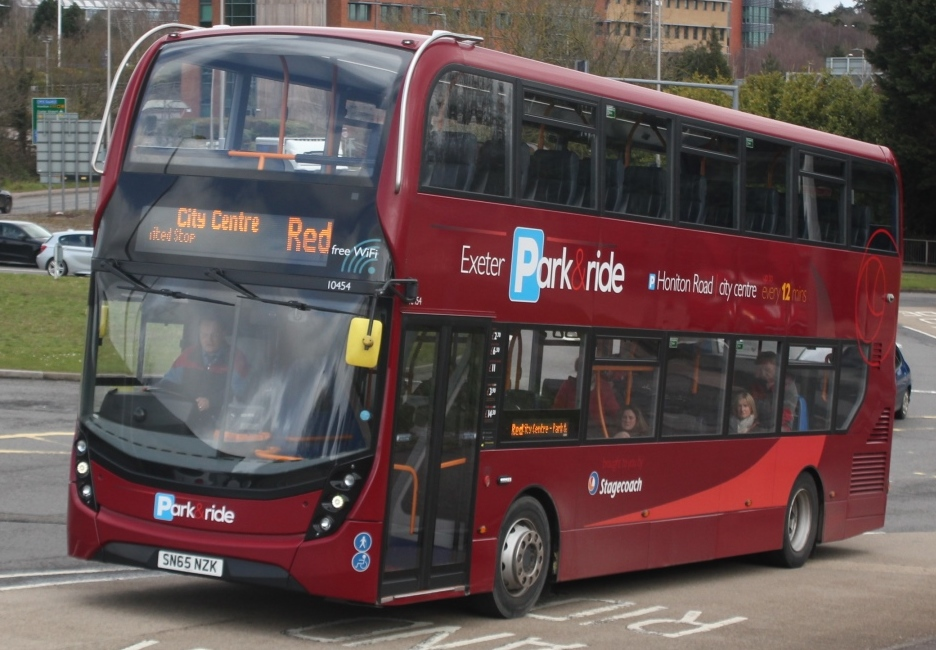
The Exeter scheme branding, emphasising the route, convenience, safety, and frequent nature of the service

Permanent park and ride services are predominantly intended for used by car driving commuters and their passengers, with shoppers being the next largest user, although it is also often targeted at day-trippers and tourists visiting by car. As well as car drivers, park and ride bus services may also be used by pedestrians and cyclists. Several schemes offer bicycle lockers to allow use of the bus by cyclists. For foot passengers, although the journey may be quicker than regular bus services, the fares may also be higher.

For ease of access by car, a common arrangement for a permanent park and ride is a site or sites located on the outskirts or outer suburbs of a town or city, with the aim of providing a short onward trip by bus into the centre. Sites are usually located near to the major approach routes to the centre, usually near to motorway junctions or beside the main arterial routes. Some sites, such as the village on Ellon, Aberdeenshire, are located some distance from the central destination, but the site is located on a main arterial approach route. Larger regional sites exist, with longer journey times, such as Ferrytoll in Fife, Scotland. In larger cities, space permitting, sites may also be located at transport hubs or interchange stations further inside the urban area.

As well as stand alone sites, permanent daily public transport park and ride car parks may also be operated adjacent to or as part of the car park of another facility, such as Basingstoke (a Leisure Park), Doncaster (a cinema) and Derby (a retail and leisure park). Some sites utilise football stadium car parks, as they are not usually in use on working daytimes, as happens in Brighton, Reading, Dorchester and Derby; and also horse racecourses as in Leicester and Cheltenham, although these services may not be available on match/race days.

Many sites are operational five or more days a week. Some schemes are often supplemented using additional sites with car parks normally used for other purposes during the week that only operate as park and ride on a Saturday or Sunday. These sites include the local County Hall or Town Hall car parks, or University car parks. Examples include Southport and Leicester.

As of 2008, permanent bus based park and ride schemes are generally implemented in small to medium-sized towns and cities, with larger conurbations such as London, Birmingham and Manchester operating rail-based schemes. Edinburgh was the largest city with a comprehensive bus-based park and ride scheme, until replaced in part with the Edinburgh Trams network in 2014. In Manchester, the local transport authority, Transport for Greater Manchester, does not believe that park and ride systems achieve the main aim of reducing car based mileage, stating that when implemented, most passengers are drawn from people who would otherwise have used existing bus services, or cycle/walk, with only 1 in 5 spaces on average being filled by people who did not previously use public transport.

=== Site facilities ===
Purpose-built park and ride sites generally consist of a car park and adjacent bus-boarding facility within walking distance. Large sites may feature covered multi-story parking, and covered waiting areas or passenger facilities akin to a small bus station. Bigger car parks may feature more than one bus stop to limit the distance users have to walk. Smaller sites may feature just a bus stop and cabin for an attendant. For sites used as bus termini, the site may also feature bus stands.

The location of park and ride sites is usually predominantly sign posted to assist car drivers, and sometimes there may exist electronic signs giving current information about parking availability. Many sites feature a controlled perimeter, entry/exit barriers, CCTV and supervision by an attendant.

=== Planning issues ===
The location of sites is often restricted due to planning issues and land availability. The location of potential sites may conflict with the desires of other development aims. Some local authorities introduce new schemes as part of wider developments by stipulating as part of the planning permission approval that a private developer may only proceed if they include a suitable scheme in their development proposals.

The advent of Local transport plans enacted by the Transport Act 2000 in England has allowed park and ride usage to be a material consideration in planning matters in England.

In 2005 the Campaign to Protect Rural England called for a review of park and ride development expressing concern too many sites were being built on green belt land.

In 2008, a scheme proposed by North Yorkshire County Council for a site for Whitby on green land within the North York Moors National Park was rejected by the park planning committee on grounds of its proposed location, within the park, despite claims by the borough council that no suitable alternatives existed, and traffic was an increasing issue in the town which threatened the prospects of economic growth.

In 2008 in Truro, Cornwall, a scheme was launched aiming to be complementary and integrated with the rural environment, marketed as a "park for cars" rather than a car park, with features such as natural building materials, solar power and waste water management

=== Bus operators and vehicles ===
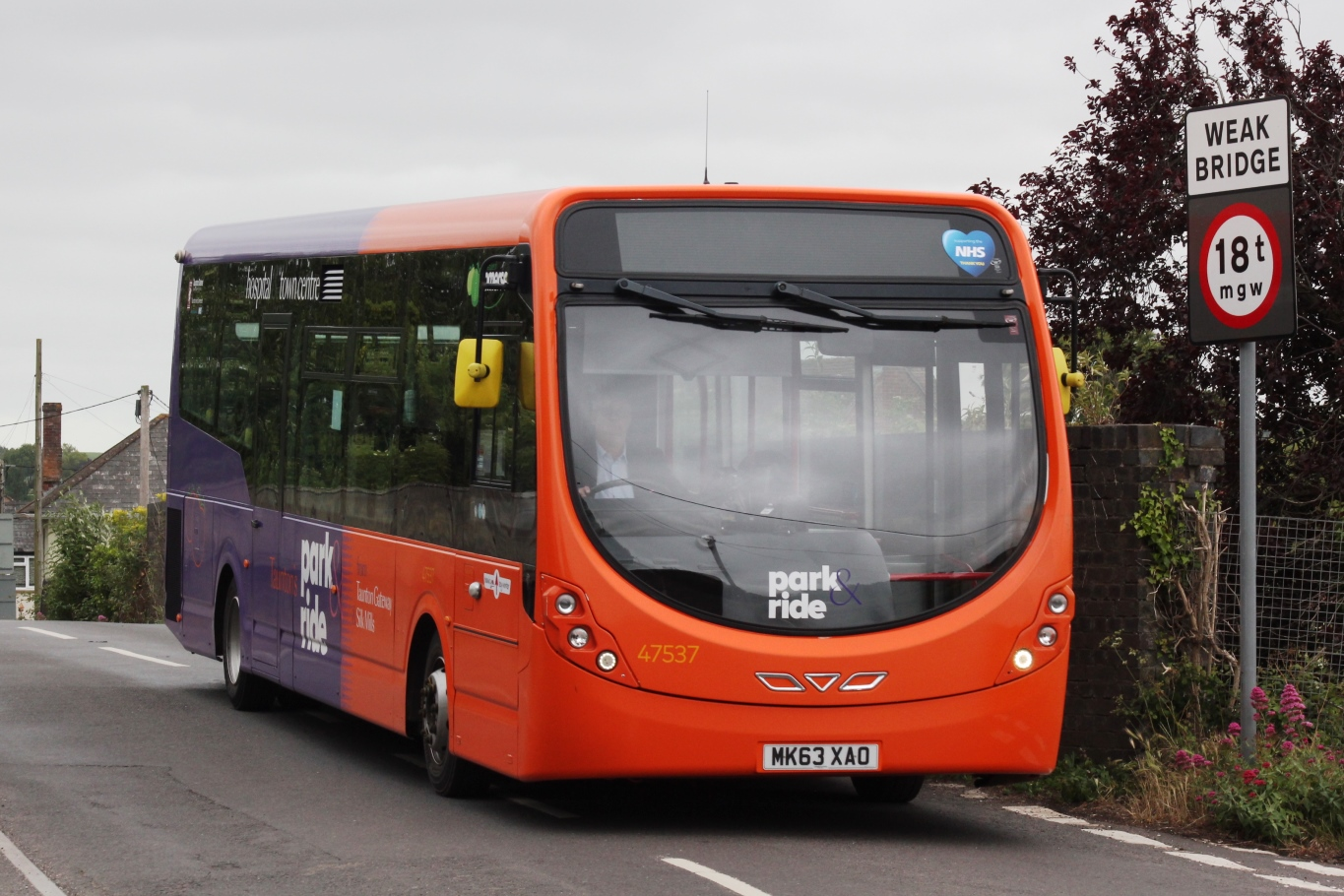
A Wright Streetlite of Taunton Park and Ride

To comply with UK competition legislation, contracts for the bus operation aspect of schemes supported by local authority finance must be put out to commercial tender, although minimum quality conditions are often stipulated as part of the contract. Some bus operating contracts are awarded on the basis of a formal Quality Contract between authority and operator. For reasons of practicality and logistics, the winning bus operator is usually an operator already based in the local area.

Dedicated park and ride bus services are usually provided using public transport buses. Depending on the passenger numbers, service may be provide with a combination of midibuses, single-decker buses, double-decker buses. In some schemes such as in Bristol (Bath Road), articulated buses are used. As of 2008, the Optare Solo is a common type of midibus found on smaller schemes.

As with standard public transport bus services in the UK, as of 2008 the responsibility for operation of the buses for park and ride schemes is dominated by the major transport groups, either in part or full, with FirstGroup involved with 12 locations, Arriva and Stagecoach Group involved in 7, Go-Ahead Group in 6. Despite this, operation by small groups or independent operators forms a significant aspect of UK park and ride operations, such as Johnsons Excelbus (Stratford upon Avon) and Bennets Coaches (Cheltenham). Some municipal bus companies operate their town's service, such as Edinburgh (Lothian Buses), Nottingham (Nottingham City Transport), Swindon (Thamesdown Transport), Reading (Reading Buses), although the November 2008 transfer of the Ipswich operation from Ipswich Buses to First Eastern Counties demonstrated that council owned bus companies are not necessarily given favourable status in the awarding of council park and ride contracts.

For large schemes, park and ride bus fleets used are usually of a higher and/or different specification to the predominant public transport bus fleet. Fleets are often purchased new in whole or in part for the award of a new contract, meaning low floor buses are increasingly common.

In the Plymouth scheme, the buses are of an extremely high specification compared to regular public transport buses, being equipped with high backed leather seating, television screens, and individual radio/CD sockets for each seat.

While dedicated park and ride fleets generally contain some of the newest vehicles in a bus company's fleet, in some areas this does not occur, for example, the award-winning operator in Derby, Trent Barton, defers operation of the park and ride to its Wellglade group sister company Notts & Derby, using vehicles older than that of the Trent Barton main fleet.

=== Success and failure ===
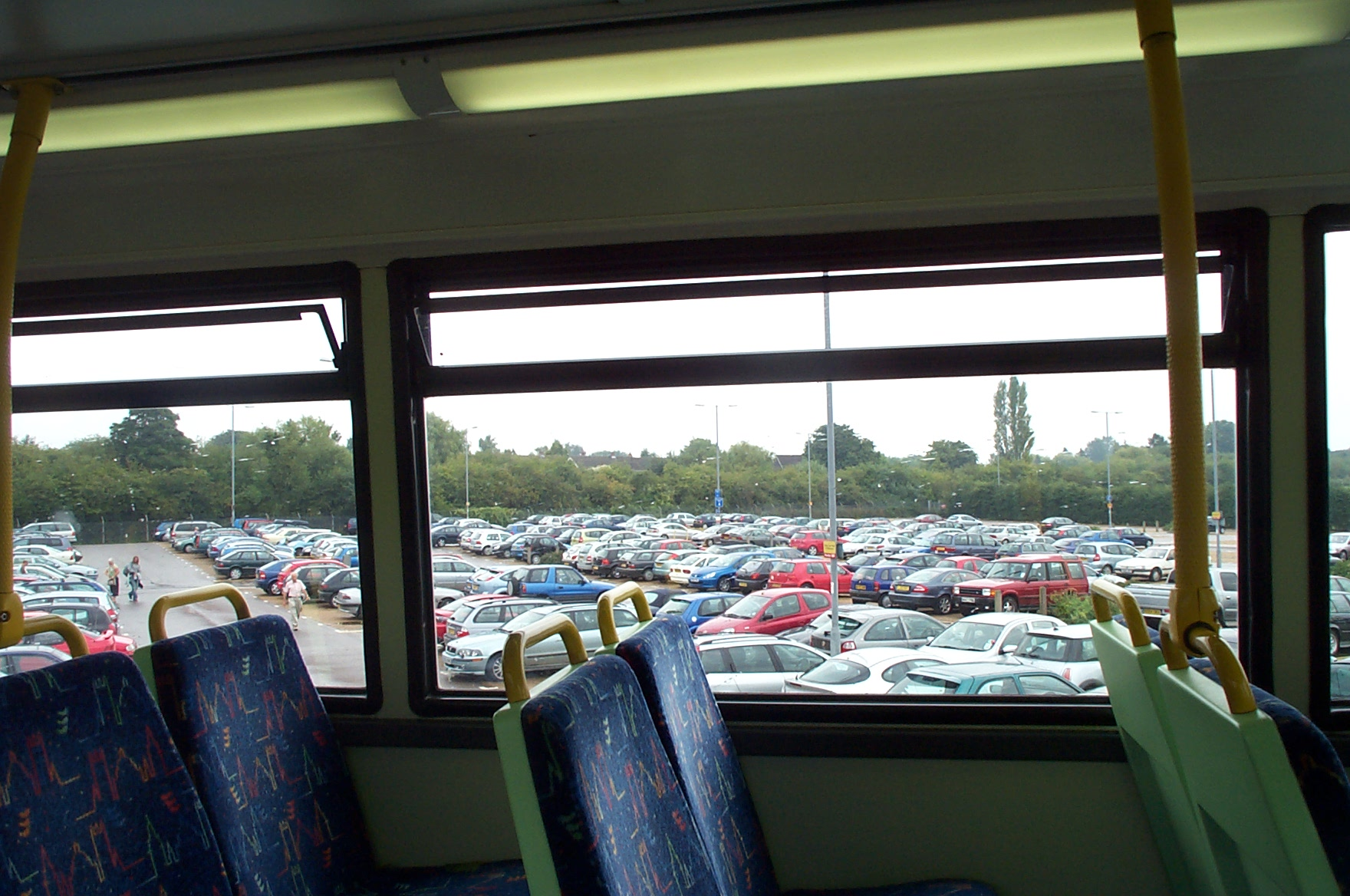
Cars fill the Oxford Pear Tree site

While most schemes are hailed as a success, and see additions to site/spaces or increase in vehicle size over time, some encounter lower than anticipated passenger numbers and need to be withdrawn/modified. In Gloucester, a two route scheme existing in 2003 was required to be scaled back and rationalised into one through service after passenger numbers fell, putting one service in doubt. In February 2008 a scheme in Kidderminster was closed down despite objections, as it was costing £1,000 a week to operate, although it was later said the scheme had been introduced as a temporary measure while building works occurred, that was allowed to continue permanently. In 2008 Sefton Council considered rerouting the bus service of Southport's third scheme after initial passenger projections were not met, although comparison was made to the slow start but eventual success of the first site. In January 2009 the service was re-routed to attract uses from the town's main hospital and college. In November 2009, Sefton Council announced the third site would be 'mothballed' for an indefinite period of time due to poor usuage. In 2007, the long-standing Maidstone scheme was reduced from four sites to three due to a reduction in usage of a centrally located site causing a budget shortfall for the council.

A service operated by Go North East from the MetroCentre shopping centre coach park non-stop to Newcastle upon Tyne which operated on a model of pre-booked parking was abandoned after a year in September 2008 due to lack of use, replaced by a conventional service with more intermediate stops.

Both Park & Ride sites in Worcester were closed in September 2014 as part of the wider local authority budget cuts at the time. The Perdiswell site opened in 2001 and at its peak in 2008, 450,000 people used the site, however by 2013–14 usage fell to 274,000. The service was operated by Worcestershire County Council.

The service in Maidstone closed in February 2022 after the operator Arriva Southern Counties said it was uneconomical to operate as it was only carrying 500 passengers per day when 1,100 were needed to break even.

=== Bus service ===
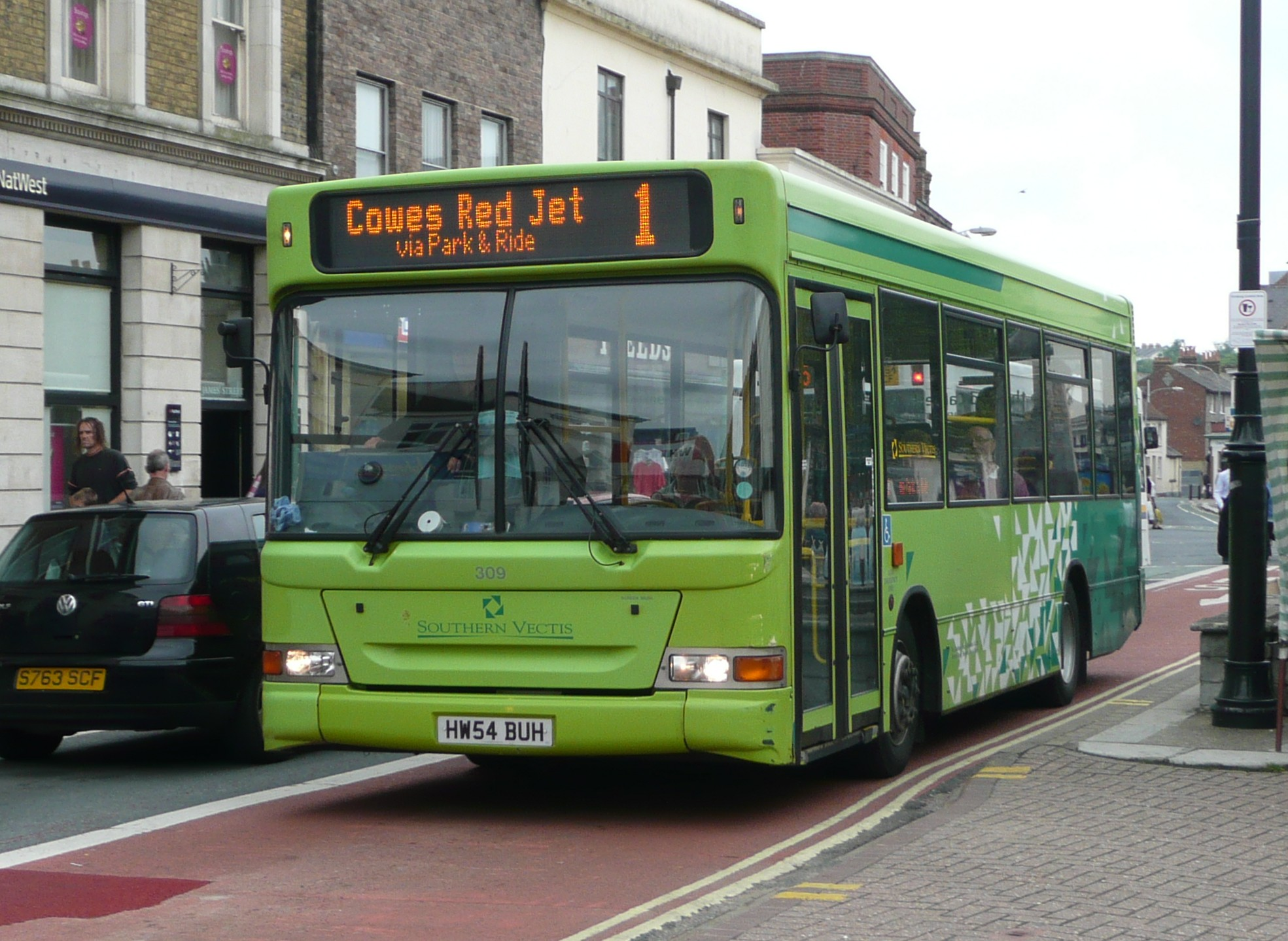
The Cowes scheme is an examples of a park and ride scheme served by a normal service. Southern Vectis run route 1 between Cowes and Newport, alternate buses running via the 'Round House' or the park and ride.

Onward bus services from a park and ride car park are provided with dedicated bus routes, the regular local bus service, or a combination of both. In busy or frequent schemes, the central bus stops may be sited separately from those used by other regular bus services. Sites already well served by or located on the existing bus network may feature no dedicated service at all. These services may employ no specific branding, but reference to 'park and ride' may exist on rollsigns and timetables. Park and ride sites may also be used as stops on longer distance coach services, although they are generally not available for use by private coach operators.

Dedicated routes are often operated point to point, running from the site to centre, and back, using the site as a bus terminus. Occasionally, through routes will run from one park and ride site to another, through the town or city centre, or to another suitable terminus such as a leisure centre. Routes may also call at multiple park and ride sites before commencing the onward journey to the destination.

Dedicated bus services can be operated as express bus services, running non-stop calling at only the car park and the central area. These services may also operate as limited stop express services, stopping also at any important intermediate locations such as hospitals, railway stations, transport interchanges, out of town shopping centres, suburban retail parks and other places that are likely to see a high number of prospective passengers. For example, Park and Ride in Truro stops at Truro College (which also includes Treliske Retail Park) the Royal Cornwall Hospital, Royal Cornwall Museum and Victoria Square in Truro's high street. In areas where there is less overlap between regular bus services, park and ride designated services may stop at every stop like a regular service, as in York, where the park and ride services are also part of the local bus network. Some express or dedicated services may extend beyond the parking site as regular services to outlying areas.

=== Funding and fares ===
The majority of permanent park and ride schemes are supported by funding from the local authority, with investment for construction of the sites if included, or support for the operation of the bus services. Park and ride schemes rarely become financially self-sufficient even for just the operating costs, however most authorities cite the fact that profit is not the ultimate aim of schemes, rather the environmental benefits are what is being paid for. Some schemes where investment in a car park is not required can be funded fully commercially; the Stagecoach West Cheltenham Racecourse service is an example of a fully privately funded permanent service.

Authority involvement can be singular, or is often jointly between a borough and county council, such as in Bedford, or even as a cooperation between multiple public institutions as part of a wider regional transport initiative. Public budget provision for schemes is often combined with infrastructure and vehicle investment toward high quality bus priority schemes, such as the A638 Quality Bus Corridor for Doncaster or guided busway and bus rapid transit scheme investment.

Private companies often contribute additional funding where that company ultimately benefits from the scheme, either through increased custom or a reduction in employee parking needs. In High Wycombe, the scheme is part funded by a shopping centre and a local development partner, as well as the local council as it is integrated into the newly developed Cressex business park.

A portion of the ongoing funding of the operating costs of a park and ride scheme comes from the collection of fares from the users, although some schemes operate completely free to the user. While most fare paying schemes are operated on a free-parking, pay on the bus basis, some schemes charge for the parking, to offer a financial incentive to encourage carpooling to the car park for cars with more passengers. Examples of car based payment schemes are Norwich and Canterbury. In the Chester scheme, a 2008 proposal to move from a bus based to a car park based charging system was dropped due to public opposition

== Specialist schemes ==
As well as serving as general public transport to central areas, specialist permanent park and ride services also exist, catering for a more specific user travel need. These exist both as supplementary routes from permanent public sites, or operate from private car parks. These services may be still available to the general public, or be restricted to a specific user/customer, and may be publicly or privately funded or both.

Private user schemes marketed as park and ride include airport buses and other shuttle bus links where they transport passengers from a car park to a destination such as a hotel or conference centre.

NHS Trust supported routes link public park and ride sites to hospitals, such as in Nottingham (Medlink), Reading and Cheltenham, for the benefit of passengers and staff. In Bath, a demand responsive transport service has been combined with a park and ride to hospital shuttle.

Another specialist service is the transport of football spectators to football matches from public park and ride sites, such as in Southampton. These services may only be available to those with a match ticket. A football service is privately funded by Sunderland A.F.C. on match days from the Stadium of Light to Sunderland Enterprise Park.

== Temporary schemes ==
Some sites only become operational during a specific season, or for specific events, and as such may receive public or private financial support, or in the case of high usage, be self-funding. These ad-hoc services may not feature a dedicated bus fleet, but rather are provided by drawing on buses from other duties. Temporary or seasonal services often use free buses, such as Weymouth, which uses existing public pay and display car parks.

Seasonal services occur in the summer to cater for tourists, such as Weymouth, or the Christmas period to cater for shoppers, such as Peterborough and Kingston.

Examples of services for specific events are Southampton (for the Boat Show) and Whitby (for the Whitby Regatta)

== Marketing and liveries ==
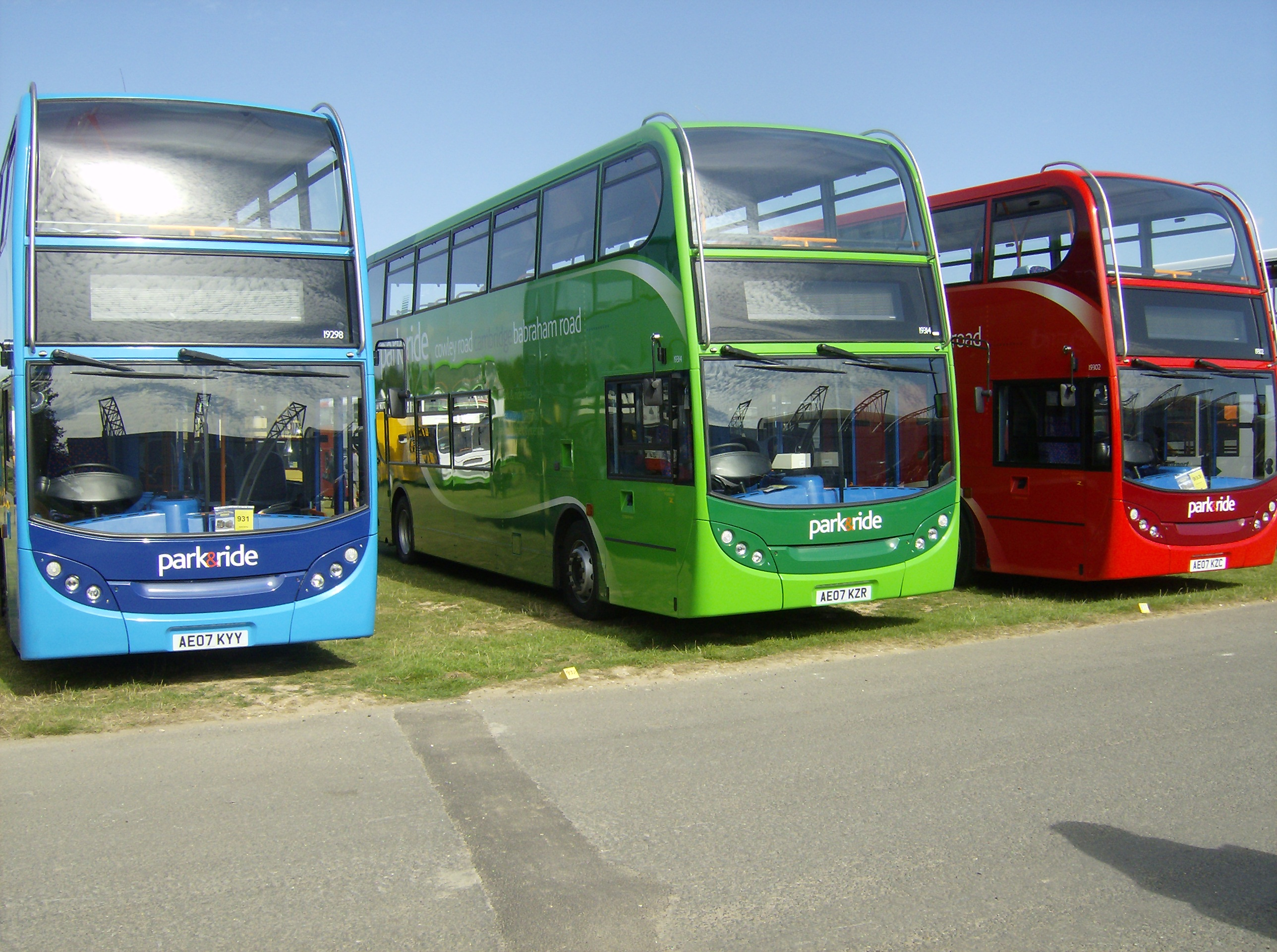
The three route specific all over liveries formerly used for buses for the Cambridge scheme

Some high-profile public authority backed schemes employ a common "park and ride" brand identity for their park and ride scheme, and project this brand commonly across a website, printed material, and even extending to the colour of the bus in an all-over livery. In a small number of cases, the branding concept does not use the "park and ride" moniker as the primary identity, opting for a different name, such as Centre Shuttle (Basingstoke), Quicksilver Shuttle (Leicester), Taunton Flyer and Park for Truro.

Smaller schemes may not necessarily employ specific marketing or dedicated all-over liveries where the passenger revenue does not justify this, such as in Stoke and Scarborough, although the term "park and ride" is a near-universally accepted term that is still applied to these smaller schemes on timetables and/or non-overall livery route branding. This also occurs in busier schemes where other high-profile branding of local bus services exist, or the park and ride bus service is of the type that only consists of just another regular stop on the local services, rather than a dedicated shuttle type service, such as in Leeds and Nottingham.

Schemes will often be promoted in terms of being high quality, with bus drivers undergoing customer service training, and schemes attaining the government Charter Mark for excellence in public service quality, or the Park Mark award for implementing enhanced car park security features. Maidstone was the first scheme to obtain a Charter Mark.

All-over liveries are employed in single or multiple site schemes. Liveries often emphasise the green credentials of the scheme, such as Plymouth's cloud livery, or by using green as a base colour (Oxford, Winchester). Other schemes use a bold overall colour scheme to reinforce the brand with publicity material, such as the Chelmsford (jet-black), Maidstone (yellow), Canterbury (Silver base with green piping and decals), York (All-over silver with large red City crests), Basingstoke (purple) and Ipswich (pink), coordinated with the colours used in a website/publications. In some multiple site schemes, the all-over livery aspect is often extended to a distinct livery for each route/group of routes, such as the multi-colour coded schemes of Swansea, Norwich and Cambridge.

At peak times, standard liveried buses from the operator's main fleet may also supplement the service, or as replacement cover in the event of a dedicated vehicle's failure.

== Locations ==
=== Ferrytoll ===
As well as the Edinburgh council schemes, a regional scheme exists in Scotland in the form of a large site in south Fife, designated the Ferrytoll park and ride. It does not have a dedicated service, but rather a large number of regional services are coordinated through the site, serving as a park and ride service south to Edinburgh, and as an important intermediate stop for inter-urban and long-distance services north into Fife and Dundee. The southern park and ride section aims to relieve the congested Forth Bridge road crossing.

=== England ===
Number of parking sites †	Location
9	Nottingham
8	Sheffield
6	Norwich, York
5	Cambridge, Oxford, Salisbury,
4	Chester, Exeter (3 services to Exeter City Centre, and 1 to Wonford Hospital) Guildford Winchester
3	Bath, Bristol, Canterbury, Durham,Leeds, Leicester, Plymouth, Reading, Southport, Shrewsbury, Wolverhampton
2	Chelmsford, Cheltenham, Derby, Doncaster, Gloucester, Hull, Ipswich, Maidstone, Preston, Scarborough, Taunton, Truro,
1	Basingstoke, Barnstaple, Bedford, Brighton, Colchester, Coventry, Cowes, Dorchester, Falmouth, High Wycombe, Horsham, Ludlow, Milton Keynes, Stratford upon Avon, Swindon, Worcester, Lancaster

=== Northern Ireland ===
In Northern Ireland, bus based park and ride is organised on a regional basis by Translink. Belfast and other towns and cities are served by various sites, with bus services operated by Ulsterbus with their local bus services, and their Goldlink interurban branded services. Unlike in the rest of the UK, several site in Northern Ireland are as small as 10 spaces up to around 300, with (as of 2008) 20 sites across Northern Ireland.

=== Scotland ===
Number of parking sites †	Location
6	Edinburgh
3	Aberdeen, Perth
2	Stirling
1	Falkirk

=== Wales ===
Cardiff, the capital, currently operates four sites in north, south, east and west of the city. A scheme in Swansea, in the south west of the country, currently operates from three sites. The Mid Wales town of Aberystwyth also has its own scheme.

† – Not including sites proposed or under construction. Only including sites in use 5 days or more a week, and not seasonal/Saturday only/event only usage

== See also ==
- List of Parkway railway stations in Britain
- London River Services
- Park and ride
