= Stephen Ajadi =

Nigerian architect and urban planner

Stephen Ajadi is a Nigerian architect, urban planner and development economist. Ajadi's professional practice spans projects across Africa and the United Kingdom, and he has held academic appointments in Nigeria, the UK, and the United States.

== Early life and education ==
Ajadi was born and raised in Nigeria. He attended Ladoke Akintola University of Technology, where he earned a Bachelor of Technology degree in Architecture in 2010. In 2014–2015, Ajadi studied in the United Kingdom on a Commonwealth Scholarship, completing a Master of Design in Innovation for Sustainability at Cranfield University. He went on to obtain a Master of Environmental Design (Architecture) from the University of Lagos in 2016.

In 2018, Ajadi commenced doctoral studies at the University of Cambridge, where he pursued a PhD in Land Economy (at Fitzwilliam College) focusing on urban conflict and markets in northern Nigeria. His doctoral research was supported by a Cambridge Trust International Scholarship. His PhD thesis, titled "Conflict, Violence, and Abuja Markets: A Spatial Analysis of Impact," examined how violent conflict affects the spatial dynamics of public markets in Nigeria was completed in 2023. The study earned him the 2023 Cambridge Society for the Application of Research award for an outstanding PhD project, the 2024 Amit Bhasin Prize honoring the most outstanding young African scholar at the University of Cambridge, and the Cambridge Vice-Chancellor's Awards for Research Impact and Engagement.

== Career ==
In 2011, Ajadi founded the African Contemporary Institute of Design as a platform to promote contemporary African design education and research. Later, in 2015, he established Ruban Office as his architectural and planning practice. The firm's notable projects include the Abuja Industrial City master plan, a 3,500-hectare proposed mixed-use city on the outskirts of Abuja, and the Ogun State Strategic Development Plan, a 16-year urban–rural growth blueprint for southwestern Nigeria, as well as the Cape Coast Smart City project in Ghana, a planned 20,000-hectare city for up to one million residents.

Beyond his planning practice, Ajadi has contributed to various projects and initiatives. In 2021, he served as an urban planner fellow at British Telecommunications (BT) in the UK, where he led a sociological study on optimizing work environments and helped redesign BT's Adastral Park technology campus. He also worked with the Cambridge ThinkLab as a consultant, developing finance strategies for transitioning the UK's National Health Service to net-zero carbon operations by 2030. In 2025, Ajadi was part of a team of researcher who received a Wellcome Trust's Climate Impacts Awards to conduct a study aimed at "Uncovering and Tackling Activity-Related Heat Exposure and Associated Health Risks at Transit Hubs in Lagos."

In 2019, Ajadi served as a visiting lecturer and critic at Kingston School of Art and at the University of California, Berkeley, where he taught a graduate course on African urbanism, ecology, and creativity. After completing his PhD, Ajadi joined the faculty of the Architectural Association School of Architecture in London as a tutor in 2023.

== Selected Publications ==
Ajadi, Stephen (2013). "Apoptosis in city systems: a biomimetic approach to city regeneration". Journal of Construction Project Management and Innovation 3, no. 1: 589–607.

Ajadi, Stephen (2022). "Durumi Camp, Abuja: Conflict and the Spatial Praxes of a Furtive-Periphery." In: Embodying Peripheries, eds. Giuseppina Forte, Hwa Kuan. Firenze University Press. p. 120-145.

Ajadi, S.B. (2012). "Morphing the Rules: Advanced Adaptations of Mud in Nigerian Buildings". In: Laryea, S., Agyepong, S.A., Leiringer, R. and Hughes, W. (Eds.) Proceedings of the 4th West Africa Built Environment Research (WABER) Conference, 24–26 July 2012, Abuja, Nigeria, 163–175.

Ajadi's works have also been the subject of scholarly engagement, such as Igwe, J. M. (2019). "Doctrines and Layers in Space: A Critique of Stephen Ajadi’s Design for the Anglican Church in Ogidi, Nigeria". Lagos Journal of Architecture, 3, 61–78.
