= Centre for Integrated Photonics =

English research centre

Coordinates: 52°3′34.3″N 1°16′55.2″E

The Centre for Integrated Photonics (CIP) was a research and development centre for photonic devices. It was based in Phoenix House at Adastral Park in Martlesham, UK. It was bought by Huawei in 2012, between 2003 and 2012 it was owned by EEDA, prior to that it was owned by Corning Incorporated.
