= Buses in Ipswich =

Bus services in Ipswich, Suffolk, England

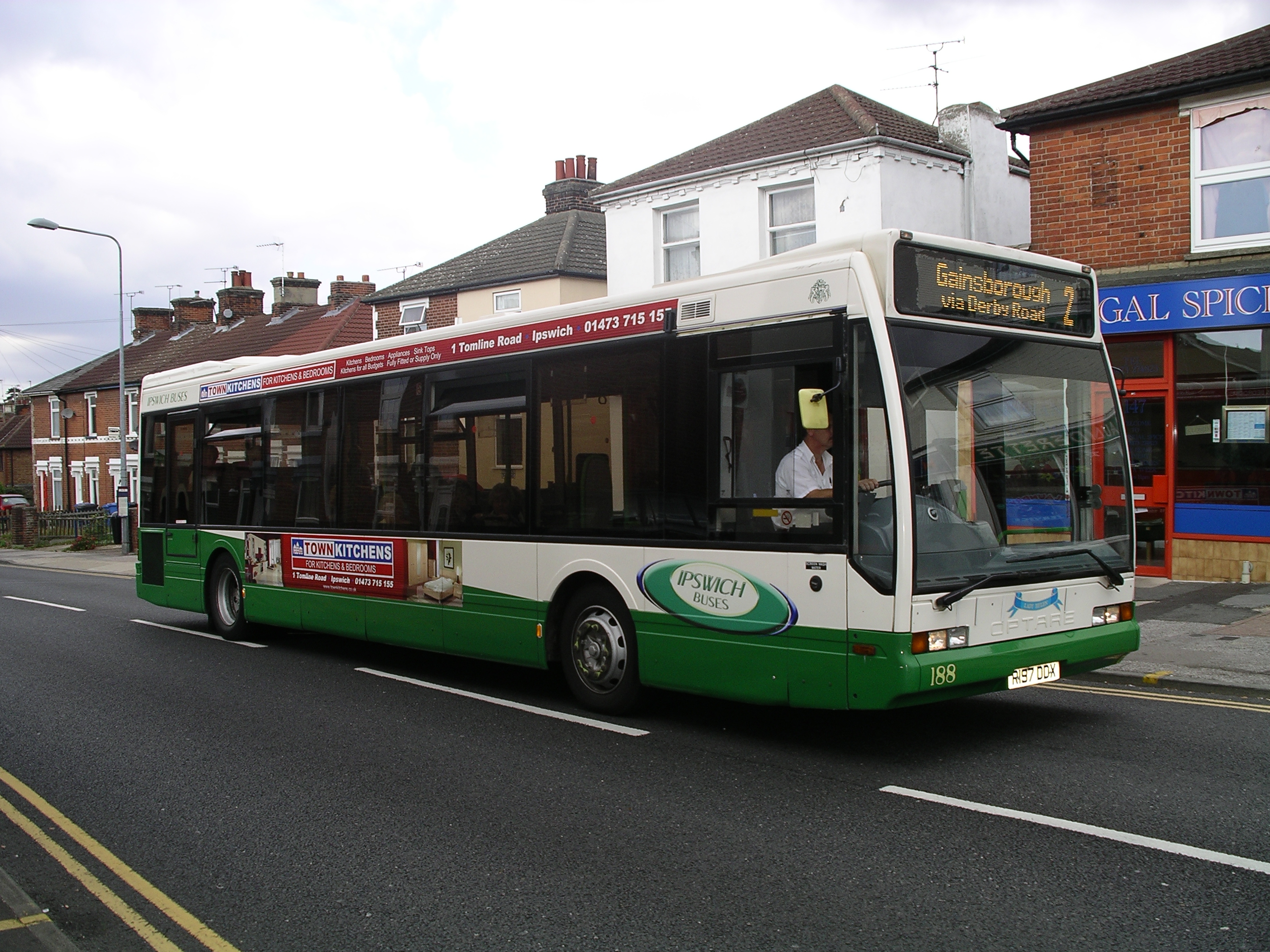
An Optare Excel operated by Ipswich Buses on route 2

Buses in Ipswich operate in the town of Ipswich in the English county of Suffolk. As of 2013 services are primarily operated by Ipswich Buses and First Norfolk & Suffolk, although other smaller operators, such as Galloway European, Carters Coaches and Beestons, operate routes from the town into the surrounding rural area. Many of the current routes are based on those established at the end of the 19th century when a horse tram network developed.

== History ==
=== Horse Trams (1880–1903) ===
The first ever network of public transport in Ipswich was one of horse trams. The proposal was accepted by the Board of Trade in 1879 and on 13 October 1880, the first line between Cornhill and the railway station opened, using 2 trams, drawn by only one horse each. The two trams were made in Birkenhead, were painted in a brown and cream livery and each carried up to 18 seated passengers. New routes soon opened: Princes Street to Brooks Hall Road in 1881, Cornhill to Barrack Corner in 1882 and Majors Corner to Derby Road railway station in 1883. In an Act of Parliament in 1881 the business was named the Ipswich Tramway Company. By 1884, the fleet had expanded up to 6 single-deck and 2 double-deck trams, pulled by a total of 18 horses. Trams were stored at Quadling Street since the beginning of the tramway and the Ipswich Transport Company continued to keep them there throughout the tramway's lifetime. The network did not expand further in any way, except for the conversion of 3 single-deck trams to double deck, and in 1901 the company was sold to the Ipswich Corporation, who continued to run the horse trams until 6 June 1903, when the network was closed for conversion to electric trams.

==== Ipswich Omnibus Service rivalry ====
In 1898, a rival transport operator, the Ipswich Omnibus Society, appeared operating 18 buses in a red livery operated a Bramford Road – Wherstead service, to compete with the trams. Like the trams, the buses were horse drawn, however they operated a '1d all the way' fare in order to take business away from the trams. This forced the Ipswich Tramway Company to lower their fares, however the buses still had an advantage over the trams: they operated on Sundays. The bus network expanded, doubling the trams' routes and serving areas not served by trams. Buses were stored on Kemball Street, off Foxhall Road. When the tram network ceased operations in June 1903 for the conversion to electric trams, the buses continued operating and took over all of the business, however when the new electric tram network opened, the buses were no longer viable and the Ipswich Omnibus Service ceased all operations by the end of 1903.

=== Electric Trams (1903–1926) ===
Over 5 months, almost 11 miles of track was laid and electric lines were hung, ready for the trial run to Whitton, then a village, on 10 November 1903. A site on Constantine Road, then a marshy area, was bought and a depot, alongside new offices, was erected by the Ipswich Corporation for the new fleet of 26 double-deck electric trams. They wore a livery of dark green and cream and seated 50 passengers: 24 on the top and 26 on the bottom. On 21 November 1903, the first fare-paying passengers were carried on the route from Bourne Bridge to Whitton. Within a month, routes along Spring Road to the Lattice Barn pub and along Bramford Road were opened. The expansion of the network, giving passengers a faster service, forced the Ipswich Omnibus Service to close down by the end of the year. In early 1904, a route from Vernon Street to Princes Street via St Peters Street was opened and in May a route along Felixstowe Road was completed. The tram network did not expand further and in 1924 the decision was made by the council to convert to trolleybuses, instead of refurbishing all of the track. An Act of Parliament in 1925, allowed the Ipswich Corporation to convert service to trolleybuses and on 26 July 1926 all tram operations ceased.

==== Princes Street derailment ====
On the first day of public operations, at 3.40pm, car no. 20, operating a Wherstead Road – Railway Station service, derailed at a set of points at the top of Princes Street. The derailed car blocked the entire street, causing a back-up of traffic. After failed attempts at getting the car back onto the tracks, car no. 8 was used to help, however these attempts failed as well. The car was emptied and passengers transferred to car no. 8. Within a half hour of the accident, 9 trams were backing up around the Cornhill area. Eventually, car no. 24 was deployed to help with car no. 20 and together with car no.8, the derailed tram was brought back onto the tracks. The whole event caused much excitement to the public and many were watching the scene.

=== Eastern Counties (1919–current) ===
Brothers Walter and Thomas Wolsey, noticed a gap in the market being the lack of any longer-distance motorbus services, except for one service to Shotley operated by the Great Eastern Railway. They visited Ipswich in order to explore the possibility, having previously been involved in motorbus operations in London and Brighton, and convinced Thomas Tilling Ltd. from Brighton to send four buses, which began operations in June 1919. After two months of experimental operations, the Eastern Counties Road Company (ECRC) was formed and took over all services from the Wolsey Brothers on 1 September 1919. 16 Tilling Stevens TS3 petrol electric buses were deployed by the ECRC for operations.

The network soon expanded, which lead to a new base being set up at Bury St. Edmunds. 24 more buses were delivered from Thomas Tilling both from London and Brighton to form a fleet of forty vehicles. In April 1922, Great Eastern Railway's Shotley service was taken over, however the existing buses used on that route were moved to Thames Valley Traction. To compete with the ECRC's services, small operators appeared, most notably Beestons and Partridges, the former of which operates bus services around Ipswich to this day. Except for the take over of the Shotley service, in 1925, the ECRC took over R. A. Moore of Aldeburgh and by the end of 1926, had a fleet of 70 vehicles. In 1928 more take overs continued: A. Quantrill of Kesgrave and Felixstowe Motor Services with W. V. Edmonds of Shotley and Swiftsure Bus Company of Ipswich in 1929. A further two motorbus operators were taken over in 1930.

The Transport Act 1930 began regulating bus services and the ECRC was merged with the Ortona Motor Company of Cambridge, Peterborough Electric Traction Company and the East Anglia division of United Automobile Services into one company, the Eastern Counties Omnibus Company. By the time of the merger, ECRC had built up a fleet of 131 vehicles, primarily made by Tilling Stevens.

The new company continued to absorb many companies, in the fashion of the ECRC. The bus network around Ipswich had not had any significant changes until the Transport Act 1968, when all bus companies were taken over by the National Bus Company (NBC).

=== Trolleybuses (1923–1963) ===
The first trolleybus service in Ipswich was a trial service taking over the Cornhill – Rail Station route from the trams. The trolleybuses were operated by the Ipswich Corporation, initially with 3 hired single-deck vehicles. They used the existing overhead lines and were initially dubbed for marketing purposes 'Trackless Trams'. 1924 saw the delivery of another 2 trolleybuses and in 1926 the 5 vehicles were bought and another 30 delivered, in replacement of the electric trams. Half of those were built in Ipswich, by Ransomes, and the remaining half in Leiston, by Garratts. 15 more trolleybuses arrived in the following few years. In 1933 a rapid expansion of the network took place. Double decker trolleybuses were delivered, made once again by Ransomes, and a new depot was constructed at Priory Heath in 1937. Within another 3 years, 41 double-deckers were in operation. After the war in 1948 and 1950 yet more trolleybuses were put into operation, however also in 1948, after the electricity supply for the network was nationalised, Richard Chandler, the traffic manager, decided to test out new routes using motor buses, to see if a trolleybus service was viable, prior to the expense of putting up overhead lines. These routes were to the Whitehouse and Maidenhall estates. Trolleybuses were never introduced on those routes, due to the motor buses having more flexibility and the decision was made after the 1950 delivery of trolleybuses, to replace the network with motor buses. The last single deck trolleybus was replaced in 1953 and over the following 10 years, gradually more and more motor buses were delivered and eventually replaced all trolleybuses on 23 August 1963.

=== Ipswich Motorbuses (1950–1986) ===
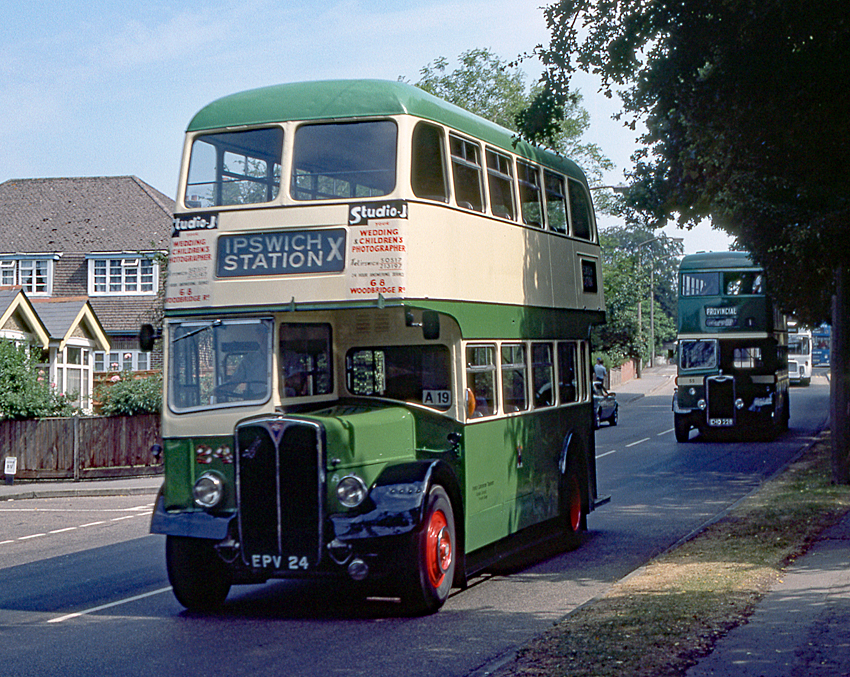
Ipswich Motorbuses AEC Regent III Park Royal EPV24

Despite Ipswich being one of the first towns to convert to trolleybus operations, it was one of the last to convert to motor bus operations. The first motor buses entered service in August 1950 as trial services, for the future conversion to trolleybuses, to the new council estates at Whitehouse and Maidenhall. 6 double-deck AEC Regents were used initially, however due to trolleybus operation costs rising, the decision was made to gradually cease trolleybus operations. Over the following decade another 51 motor buses were ordered and put into service, replacing trolleybuses in 1963. By 1966, the fleet was at 67 motor buses, 13 of which single deck. After 1968, new buses were mostly Leyland Atlanteans with rear engines and front entrances to allow for the driver to collect the fares, in order to reduce operating costs. After 1983, mostly single deck buses were bought and 25 buses made by Dennis were delivered by 1986. After deregulation, because of the Transport Act 1985, and on 26 October 1986, Ipswich Buses Ltd. was formed.

== Current operations ==
After the deregulation of bus services in 1986, Ipswich Borough Council took over ownership of Ipswich Motorbuses and renamed it Ipswich Buses Limited. In 1988, Bickers of Coddenham was taken over and in 1989, the same happened with Squirrells of Hitcham. The two companies' rural networks were branded 'Suffolkbus' by Ipswich Buses and the routes continue to operate in 2013, although many of them are no longer operated by Ipswich Buses.

In 1994, Mainline of Sheffield planned to operate buses over 10 of the routes already operated by Ipswich Buses. The plan did not go ahead and the buses were sold to First Eastern Counties, who jointly operated the town network with Ipswich Buses. This arrangement continued until October 2000. After that, First Eastern Counties continued operating 2 town routes, to Greenwich and to Bixley, while Ipswich Buses operated all other routes.

2000 saw a decision to return to double deck buses and several low-floor double-deck buses were acquired. After an unsuccessful trial of powering a Metrorider by gas in 1995, a further attempt took place on an Optare Solo in 2005. The bus was not used frequently until 2007, when it was decided to convert the bus back to diesel.

Routes are also operated by First Norfolk & Suffolk as well as by a number of smaller operators.

== Bus stations ==
Ipswich has two bus stations, Tower Ramparts and Old Cattle Market. All town services depart from Tower Ramparts with services to surrounding towns and villages departing from the Old Cattle Market. Both bus stations were redeveloped in 2013 to improve passenger services. The Old Cattle Market was due to be completed in August 2013, however due to underground piping, the completion of the bus station was delayed until October.

Since the rebuilding of the Old Cattle Market bus station National Express coach services use the bus stops on Quadling Street at Cardinal Park, near the town centre.

== Routes ==
Town bus routes generally run from the centre of the town to serve suburban areas, including locations such as Kesgrave and BT's Adastral Park research centre at Martlesham Heath. Some services to locations outside the town include stops along main routes in or out of the urban area. Destinations outside the town include surrounding towns and villages such as Woodbridge as well as more distant locations such as Felixstowe, Colchester and Stowmarket. A free shuttle service also operates around the town centre.

Some routes within the town are subsidised by Ipswich Borough Council in order to retain the route or levels of service. The Borough council and Suffolk County Council also provided a subsidy for route 31 linking the town centre to Heath Road Hospital.

== Park and ride ==
A park and ride service was established to serve the town in 1997 with the initial car park site at Copdock Mill to the south of the town. is currently operated by First Norfolk & Suffolk. Ipswich Buses operated the service until 2008 when it was taken over by First Group. As of August 2013 there are two park and ride sites, the original site at Copdock Mill and at Martlesham to the east of the town, with services running from one site to the other through the town centre. The park and ride service was taken over by First Group in June 2017.

== Coach services ==
Ipswich is served by a number of National Express coach services. As of 2013 these link the town directly to locations such as London Stansted Airport, Heathrow Airport, London, Clacton-on-Sea, Colchester, Birmingham and Liverpool. A more local service is also operated by National Express to Stowmarket, as an extension of the service from London.

== See also ==
- Transport in East Anglia
