= Martlesham =

Village in Suffolk, England

Coordinates: 52.07327°N 1.28181°E

- Martlesham Village Hall

- Location within Suffolk
- Population: 5,478 (2011)
- OS grid reference: TM250467
- District: East Suffolk
- Shire county: Suffolk
- Region: East
- Country: England
- Sovereign state: United Kingdom
- Post town: Woodbridge
- Postcode district: IP12
- Dialling code: 01394
- Police: Suffolk
- Fire: Suffolk
- Ambulance: East of England
- UK Parliament: Suffolk Coastal

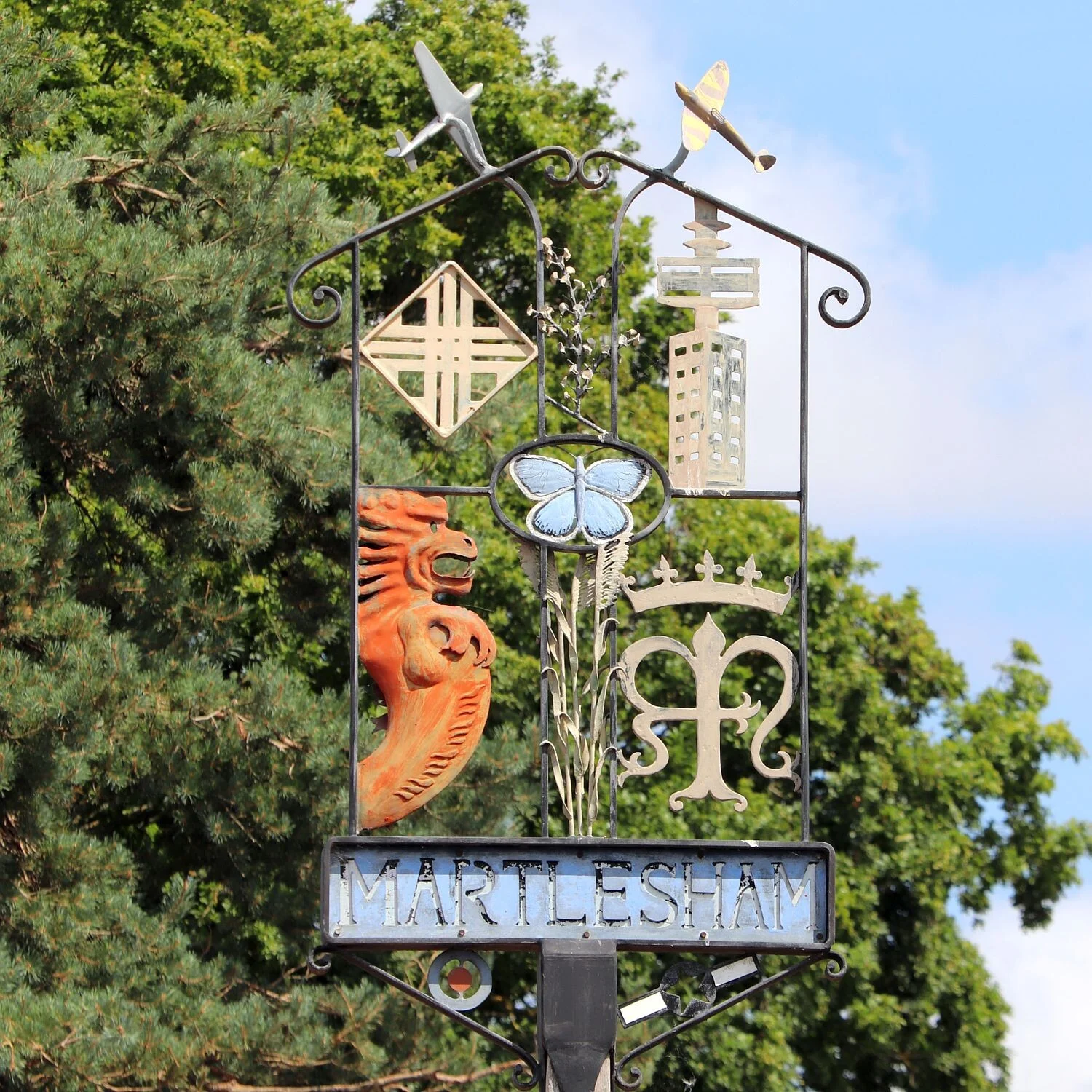
Martlesham Village Sign

Martlesham is a village in Suffolk, England about two miles (3 km) south-west of Woodbridge and 6 miles (9.7 km) east of Ipswich. It is often referred to as "old Martlesham" by locals in order to distinguish this old village from the much more recent Martlesham Heath development (1 km) to the south, although both form a single administrative parish. Also at Martlesham Heath is BT's Research and Development Centre, now called Adastral Park.

Martlesham was recorded in the Domesday Book of 1086 as Merlesham. The history and meaning of the name are studied in a paper by Briggs. It probably means 'settlement (hām) near the mooring-place (mǣrels)'.

== History of Martlesham ==
It is believed that there was a Roman settlement at Martlesham and in the parish there have been some 26 finds dating from the Roman occupation. These include pottery, brooches, coins and tesserae. Of particular note was the 19th century find of a small bronze statue of a horse on a plinth, bearing a Latin inscription indicating that this was an offering dedicated by a woman named Simplicia to the god Mars.

Martlesham was mentioned in the Domesday Book, which recorded that it consisted of two and a half carucates of land (equivalent to about 300 acres (120 ha) of profitable land). At that time there were 10 villagers; 10 smallholders; 12 acres (4.9 ha) of meadow; 1 mill; woodland for 16 pigs; 5 cobs; 20 cattle; 27 pigs; 212 sheep; and 12 beehives. There was 1 church with 36 acres (15 ha) and 1 free man.

Martlesham remained a strongly agricultural area, but the main settlement shifted over the years from the highest ground (where the church and hall are situated) to the point where the main London to Great Yarmouth road crosses the River Finn, a tributary to the Deben. By the mid-15th century, a bridge had been built across the river at this point.

White's 1844 directory of Suffolk describes Martlesham as "a neat village near the confluence of a rivulet with the Deben" and states that it has in its parish "510 inhabitants, and 2,558 acres (1,035 ha) of land, partly in rich marshes washed by the tides of the Deben, and partly a large, sandy, and unenclosed heath, extending about 2 miles (3.2 km) S.W., and affording pasturage for numerous herds of sheep and cattle."

In 1917, the Experimental Aircraft Flight of the Central Flying School was transferred from Upavon, Wiltshire to a site on the heathland at Martlesham and, on 16 January 1917, Martlesham Heath Airfield was officially opened as an experimental airfield. It continued in this role after the end of World War I and became a significant RAF airfield during the Second World War. Douglas Bader was briefly stationed at the RAF station in 1940, and a public house "The Douglas Bader" now resides on Martlesham Heath.

After the closure of the airfield, the lease of its site was sold to Bradford Property Trust, who went on to develop the "New Village" of Martlesham Heath to the southwest of "Old Martlesham".

== Martlesham now ==
Martlesham Main Road sweeps, from the A12 roundabout turn off, north-east. Population of over 5600.

The headquarters of the Suffolk Constabulary is based in Martlesham, on the south side of the A12/A1214 roundabout.

The Martlesham site of the Ipswich park and ride service opened in December 2003.

There are two pubs, Black Tiles (south part of Main Road) and the Red Lion, which was located on the old Norwich to London road. This coaching inn was used as an overnight stopover for the Royal Mail, with the post being safely locked up until the morning. The figurehead was a well-known landmark with "Red as the Martlesham Lion" being a common expression in the area. The original figure is still outside the pub today. Parts of the building date from the late 16th century, with an early 19th-century wing to the north. A Victorian brewery was also located here.

Martlesham Creek is popular for sailing pursuits. The mouth of it forms the confluence of the rivers Fynn and Deben.

School Lane marks where the former schoolhouse stood together with plenty of open fields with a view to the creek.

Church Lane and its surrounding area has been used for Christian worship since at least 1086. The Church of St Mary the Virgin (built 15th century) is down a single-track lane at the north east of Martlesham, with fields to the south and woodland to the north. There are many footpaths in the area, and a path down to Martlesham Creek crosses through the churchyard. The church has a pulpit dating from 1641 and a 15th-century font by the entrance door.

== Governance ==
An electoral ward in the same name exists. The population of this ward at the 2011 census was 4,897.

== Bibliography ==
- John Morris (Editor): Domesday Book – Suffolk (Part Two), Phillimore, 1986. ISBN 0-85033-481-0
- William White: History, Gazetteer, and Directory of Suffolk, 1844
- Gordon Kinsey: Martlesham Heath, Terence Dalton Ltd, 1975. ISBN 0-900963-48-4
- Paul Firman: Martlesham – The Good and Bad Old Days, The Martlesham Monthly, ISBN 0-9542004-0-3
