= Martlesham Heath =

Village in Suffolk, England

Coordinates: 52.061177°N 1.272471°E

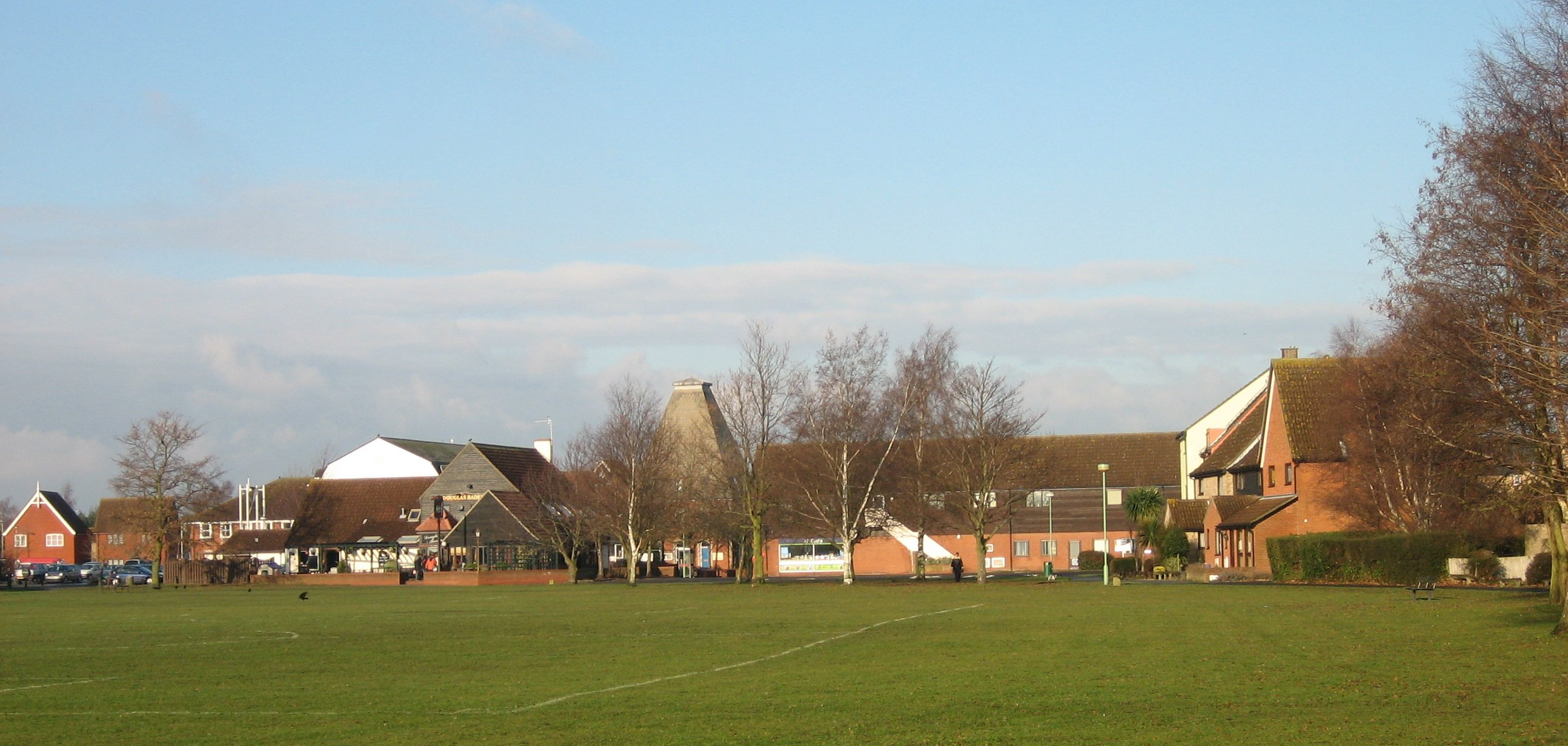
- Martlesham Heath village green and centre

- Location within Suffolk
- Area: 1.922 km^{2} (0.742 sq mi)
- Population: 2,731 (2021 census)
  - Density: 1,421/km^{2} (3,680/sq mi)
- OS grid reference: TM244453
- Civil parish: Martlesham
- District: East Suffolk
- Shire county: Suffolk
- Region: East
- Country: England
- Sovereign state: United Kingdom
- Post town: IPSWICH
- Postcode district: IP5
- Dialling code: 01473
- Police: Suffolk
- Fire: Suffolk
- Ambulance: East of England
- UK Parliament: Suffolk Coastal

Martlesham Heath is a village in the civil parish of Martlesham, in the East Suffolk district, in the county of Suffolk, England. It is 6 miles (10 km) east of Ipswich, This was an ancient area of heathland and latterly the site of Martlesham Heath Airfield. A "new village" was established there in the mid-1970s and this has developed into a modern community, based on a traditional village pattern. In 2021 it had a population of 2731. The village is also part of the wider Ipswich Built-up area.

== History ==
There is evidence of settlement in this area since the Bronze Age, with a number of round barrows surviving to the present. The main community of Martlesham grew up to the north-east, initially on the highest ground, where Martlesham Church is still located, then, later, centring on the point where the main London-to-Yarmouth road crosses the River Finn, a tributary to the Deben.

White's 1844 directory of Suffolk describes Martlesham as "a neat village near the confluence of a rivulet with the Deben" but mentions that the parish includes "a large, sandy, and unenclosed heath, extending about 2 miles S.W., and affording pasturage for numerous herds of sheep and cattle."

Up until 2013, the village held an annual festival, 'Village Day' latterly known as 'Music on the Green'. This event attracted hundreds of people each June with attractions such as live music fairground rides and Llama Jousting.

== Martlesham Heath Airfield ==
In 1917, the Experimental Aircraft Flight of the Central Flying School was transferred from Upavon, Wiltshire to a site on the heathland at Martlesham and, on 16 January 1917, Martlesham Heath Airfield was officially opened, as an experimental airfield. The unit was renamed the "Aeroplane Experimental Unit, Royal Flying Corps". After the end of World War I the site continued to be used and was, once again, renamed as the Aeroplane and Armament Experimental Establishment (A&AEE) of the Royal Air Force.

At the outbreak of the Second World War, the A&AEE was removed to a site at Boscombe Down, Wiltshire, owing to the proximity of Martlesham Heath to the East Coast and its vulnerability to enemy attack. The airfield then took on a new role as a base for fighter squadrons defending Britain. Wing Commander (later Group Captain) Douglas Bader, D.S.O., D.F.C. served at Martlesham Heath with 222 and 242 Squadrons, in 1940.

At the end of hostilities, there was no longer a role for Martlesham Heath as an operational RAF airfield and no prospect of the A&AEE returning, but the site was again used for a number of experiments with planes and armaments. However, its use declined in the 1950s, and the airfield was closed in the early 1960s.

Various proposals were put forward for the development of the site, including the proposal that it should become a civil airport. Parts of the old airfield were let out to light industry and storage companies. In 1963 the lease of the site was sold by the Air Ministry to Bradford Property Trust Ltd, for a price of £72,500.

The control tower at the airfield was built in 1942/43 for the 356th USAAF Fighter Group. It contains a museum operated by the Martlesham Heath Aviation Society detailing the RAF and USAAF presence from 1916 until the 1960s.

== Adastral Park ==
In 1968, the Post Office purchased part of the airfield and surrounding farmland and announced that they would be relocating their Research Department from Dollis Hill to a new centre to be built at Martlesham Heath. The building work took place in the early 1970s and this site has remained as the central research and development facility through the changes that have taken place with the separation of British Telecom from the Post Office and the privatisation of British Telecommunications. In the 1980s, the facility was renamed as BT Labs and was subsequently developed into a high-tech business park called Adastral Park in the 1990s.

== New village ==
In 1972 a proposal was presented by Bradford Property Trust to the Planning Department of the local council to develop a "New Village" of Martlesham Heath, with houses for 3000 people, with associated shops, schools and recreational facilities. This was accepted and has resulted in the development of the present community of Martlesham Heath. The vision of this development was to create a completely new community, but based on a traditional pattern. Hence, the village is centred on a village green, with a pub, church and cricket pavilion. In order to maintain a consistent appearance as a village, homeowners at Martlesham Heath are restricted by covenants which govern changes that they can make to their houses and gardens: for example, residents are prevented from attaching external television aerials to their houses. However, many have erected satellite TV dishes, since these were not foreseen when the covenants were written and are therefore allowed. A cable TV system was built into the development (originally provided by BT but later sold to NTL) which was the best option before satellite, since it was provided at cost price and off-air broadcasts had poor reception.

This area is very prosperous, with most homeowners having a higher income than the national average.

== Transportation ==
There is no railway station in Martlesham Heath, but there are several bus services.
