= Semantic intelligence =

Semantic intelligence is the ability to gather the necessary information to allow to identify, detect and solve semantic gaps on all level of the organization.

Similar to Operational intelligence or Business Process intelligence, which aims to identify, detect and then optimize business processes, semantic intelligence targets information instead of processes. It aims to enable better understanding and insight in data by all stakeholders. This will support better information sharing, reuse and governance and support better business decision-making.

== Semantic Gap ==
Several types of semantic gaps can be identified:

1. The semantic gap between different data sources - structured or unstructured
2. The semantic gap between the operational data and the human interpretation of this data
3. The semantic gap between people communicating about a certain information concept.

One application of semantic intelligence is the management of unstructured information, leveraging semantic technology. These applications tackle R&D, sales, marketing and security for activities that include Knowledge Management, Customer Care and Corporate Intelligence.

Several applications aim to detect and solve different types of semantic gaps. They range from search engines to automatic categorizers, from ETL systems to natural language interfaces, special functionality include dashboards and text mining.

One approach that aims to provide a holistic solution to achieve semantic intelligence is Business semantics management. Instead of focusing on very specific type of semantic gap (i.e. unstructured data), it aims to provide a whole solution to align business and it to share the understanding and semantics of information concepts.

== History ==
In 2002, the software company Expert System S.p.A. started to popularize Semantic Intelligence as a term to describe a new generation of information access technology applications based on semantic analysis. In opposition to standard systems to process unstructured information (such as keyword based systems), semantic intelligence applications focus on the meaning of the texts.

In 2008, the software company Collibra started commercializing years of academic research on semantic technology. It has positioned its Business semantics management approach as a way to achieve Semantic Intelligence.
