= Ipswich Buses =

Bus operator in Ipswich, Suffolk

Coordinates: 52°03′18″N 1°08′30″E

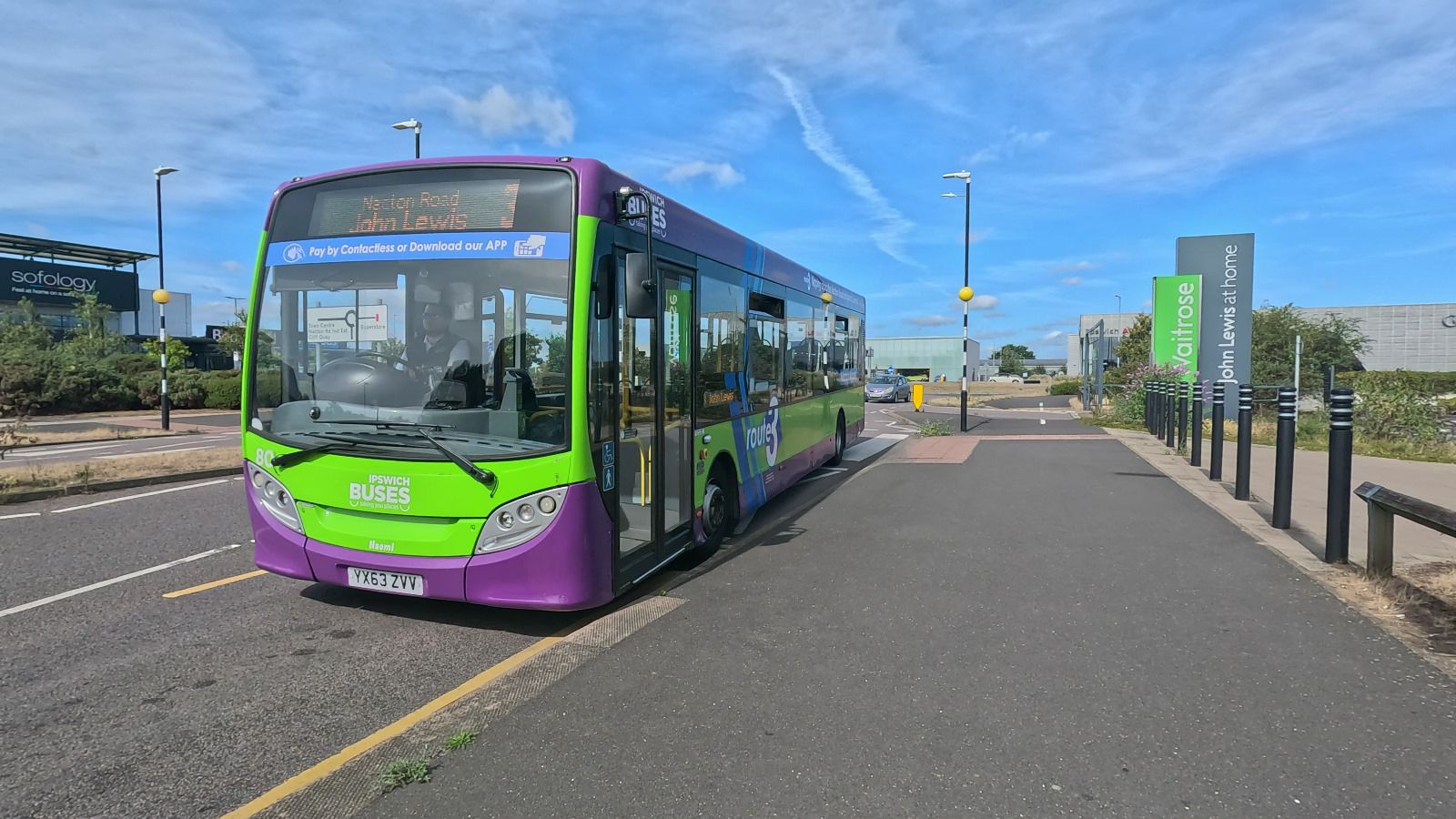
- An Alexander Dennis Enviro200 in the Number 3 Nacton Nippers livery in August 2024.
- Parent: Ipswich Borough Council
- Founded: November 1903; 122 years ago
- Headquarters: Constantine Road, Ipswich, IP1 2DL
- Service area: Ipswich, Babergh, & Colchester
- Service type: Bus services, Contracts, Rail Replacement & Private Hire
- Routes: 41 (December 2024)
- Depots: 1
- Fleet: 77 (December 2024)
- Fuel type: Diesel
- Website: www.ipswichbuses.co.uk

Ipswich Buses is a bus company that operates in Ipswich, Suffolk. It is owned by Ipswich Borough Council.

The company operates buses throughout the town and surrounding villages. Its depot is situated in Constantine Road, near Ipswich Town's Portman Road football ground. First Norfolk & Suffolk also operate bus services in the town on complementary routes.

== History ==
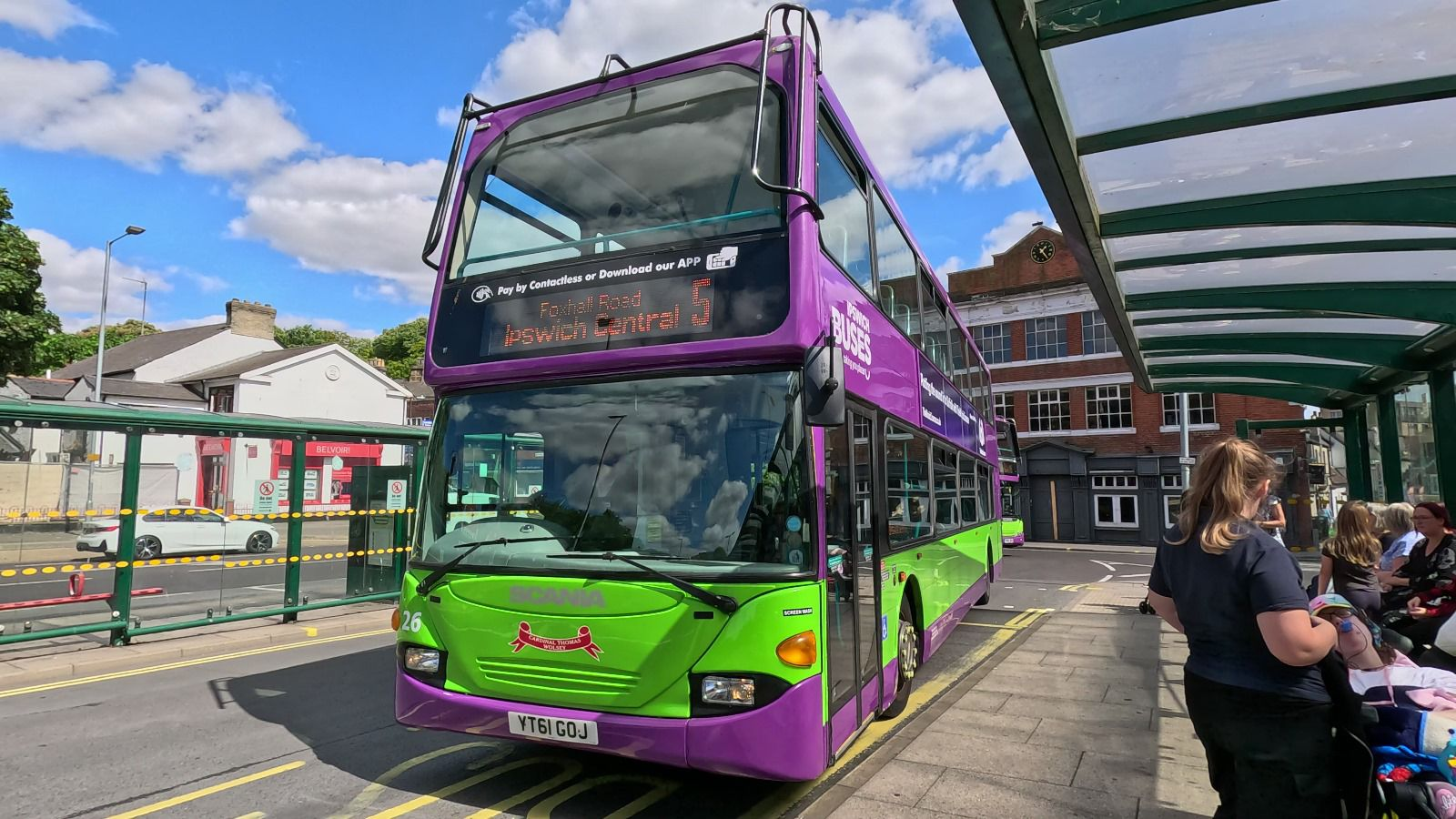
East Lancs OmniDekka with Scania N series chassis taken in August 2024

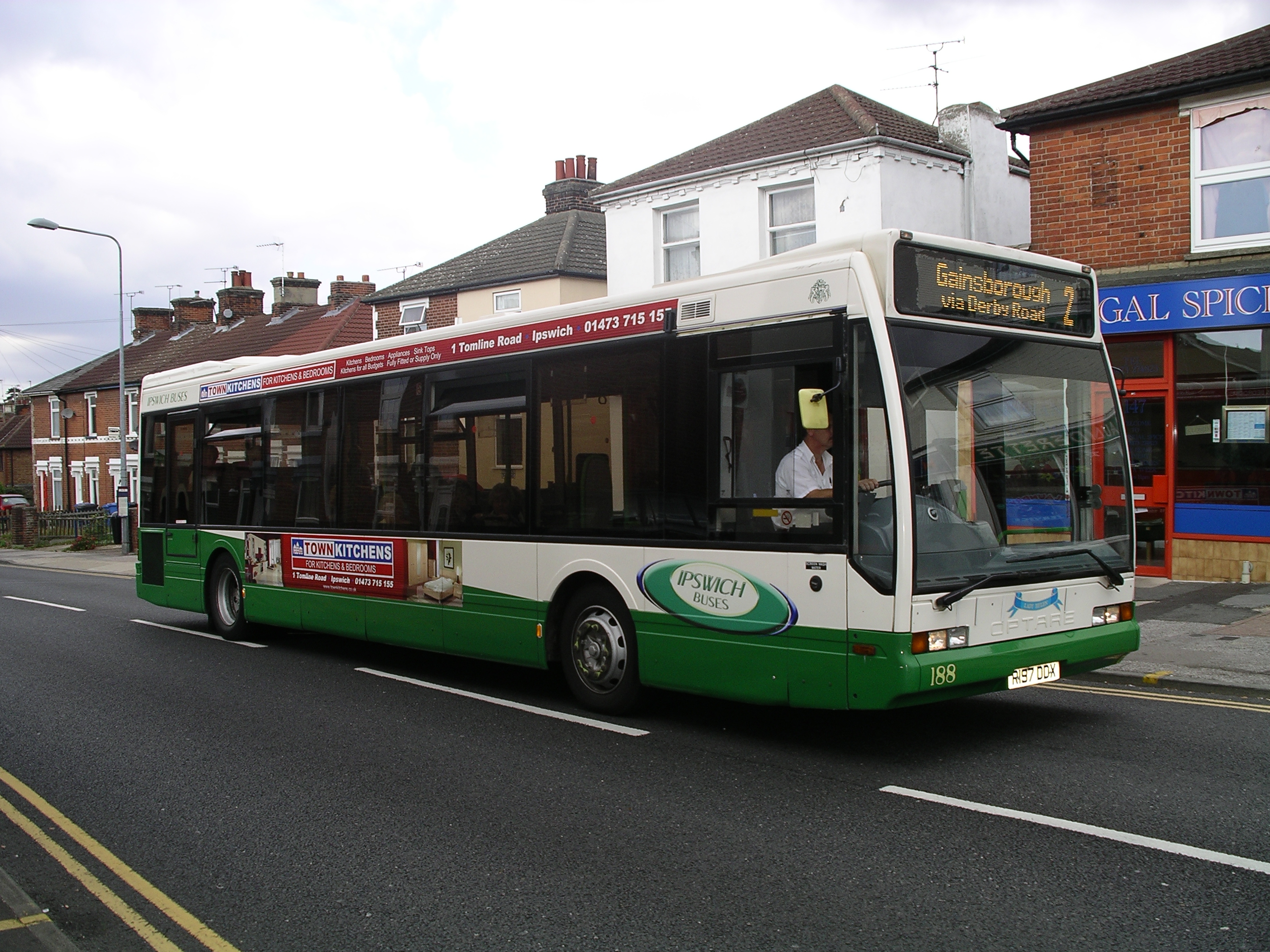
Optare Excel in September 2007

The origins of Ipswich Buses can be traced to November 1903 when Ipswich Corporation commenced operating trams. In 1923 the trams were replaced by trolleybuses. Buses were introduced from August 1950. To comply with the Transport Act 1985, in 1986 the assets of Ipswich Corporation were transferred to a new legal entity, Ipswich Buses.

In February 2016, a deal was finalised to take over the staff, bus routes and most vehicles of independent operator Carter's Coach Services.

== Park & ride ==
Ipswich Buses operated the Ipswich park & ride system under contract to Suffolk County Council from 1997 until 2008 when First Eastern Counties took over the service. In November 2013 Ipswich Buses recommenced operating the park and ride service. In July 2017 First Norfolk & Suffolk took over its operation.

== Fleet ==
As of December 2024 the fleet consisted of 77 coaches and buses.

== Services ==
As of December 2024 Ipswich Buses operate 41 town, country, and school routes.

== See also ==
- Trolleybuses in Ipswich
- List of bus operators of the United Kingdom
