= Adastral Park =

Science campus in Suffolk, England

Coordinates: 52°03′32″N 1°16′44″E

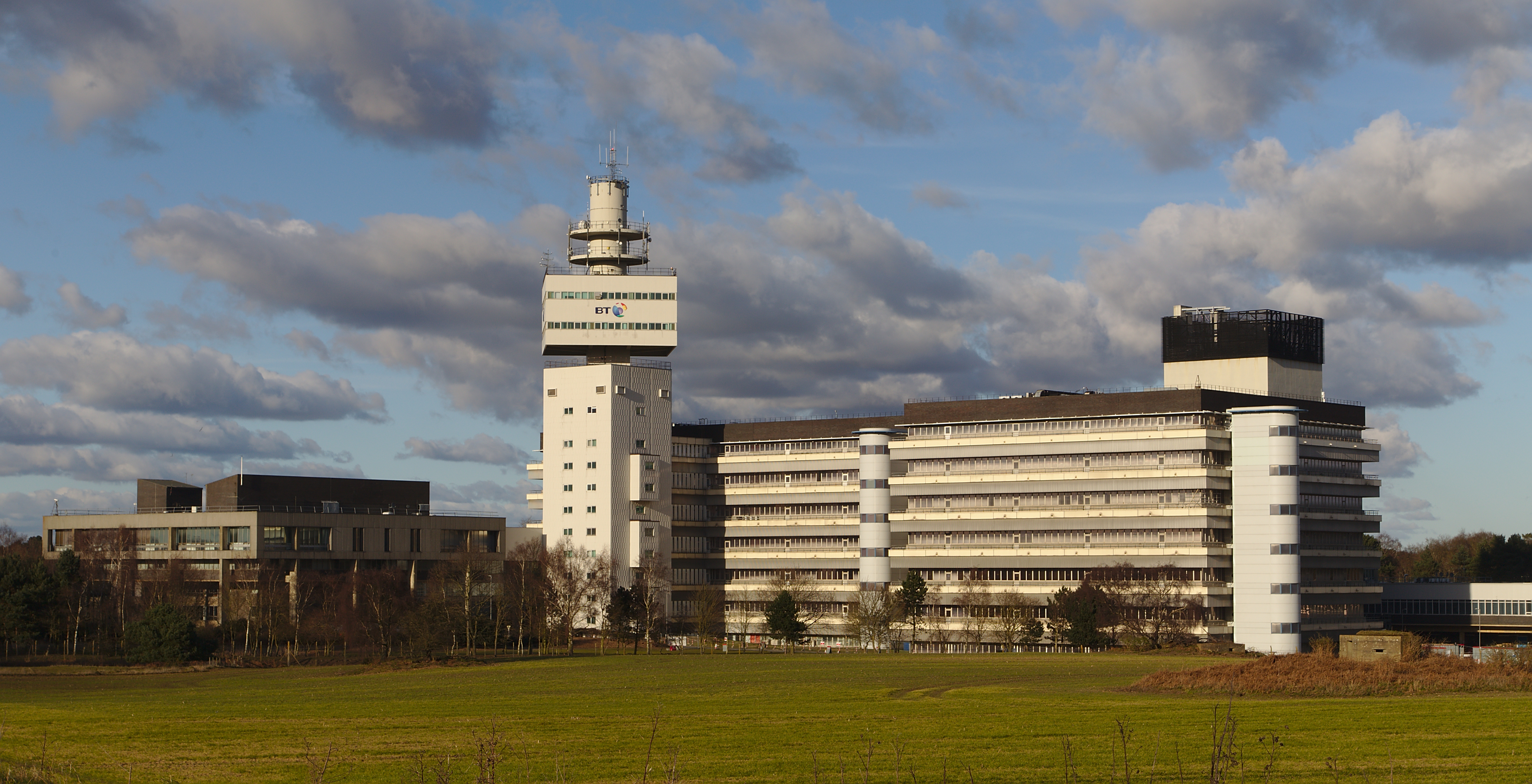
Main building, Adastral Park

Adastral Park is a science campus based on part of the old Royal Air Force Station at Martlesham Heath, near Ipswich in the English county of Suffolk.

When the site opened it was known as the Post Office Research Station, but it was subsequently renamed BT Research Laboratories or BT Labs and later Adastral Park to reflect an expansion in the organisations and activities co-located with BT Labs at the campus.

== History ==
The original laboratories (when BT was part of the Post Office) were first opened by Elizabeth II in 1975. Prior to this, the Post Office Research Station was at Dollis Hill in northwest London. Martlesham Heath was chosen as the site for a research facility because the surrounding countryside was relatively flat and therefore ideal for testing the radio-based communication systems in vogue at the time.

Initially, research was carried out into postal sorting and delivery technology, and telecommunications. After the Post Office was split apart and prior to British Telecom's privatisation in the early 1980s, the research concentrated on telecommunications.

In keeping with the stellar theme of the site name, buildings on site are named after stars or constellations (an example being the Main Laboratory Block now named the Orion building). The Orion building is easily recognisable from the nearby A12 road with its 200-foot (61 m) radio tower, now named Pegasus tower, dominating the skyline.

The change to the current name occurred in the late 1990s with the aim of turning the site into a high-technology business park, no longer exclusively for the use of BT. The name was created by Stewart Davies, the CEO of the BT business (BT Exact Technologies) headquartered at the site at that time. It is derived from the motto of the Royal Air Force—per ardua ad astra ("through adversity to the stars"). The Royal Air Force were prior occupants of the site, as RAF Martlesham Heath. Experimental aircraft test flights flew from the airfield and the name was meant to reflect this. In March 2001, University College London, Faculty of Engineering Sciences, chose Adastral Park to set up the first-ever postgraduate research and teaching centre on an industrial campus, which was housed there until 2009. During the transformation of the business park, many of the old buildings were removed and car parks were moved to the perimeter of the site, with the centre made into open parkland with a water feature to provide a 'park' feel to the complex. The site accommodates approximately 4,000 people.

== Current use ==
Companies based at Adastral Park besides BT (BT Applied Research) include:

- Openreach
- F5 Networks
- Juniper Networks
- GENBAND
- Maly IT Solutions
- Cisco
- Coderus.com
- CommsUnite
- Fujitsu
- Huawei
- O2 plc
- Arqiva
- CIP
- Milner Strategic Marketing

There is also a satellite earth station operated by Arqiva; the location was chosen for the visibility of satellites on the eastern horizon. In 2018 there were 98 high-tech companies at the site.

== Peregrine falcons ==
BT worked with the Hawk and Owl Trust to set up a nesting box for a pair of peregrine falcons. These produced two chicks in 2019, and in 2020 a YouTube channel was set up and three chicks were produced.

== Adastral New Town ==
Over many years, BT has put forward various proposals and plans to expand activities at the business park. In June 2001, a framework for expanding the business park was created, but it was not linked to building any residential housing on the site. At the time, BT forecast 3000 to 3500 additional jobs by about 2010. In 2007, BT said that they could develop the business park without the need for the income from selling land for housing.

In 2006, Suffolk Coastal District Council (SCDC) rejected a planning application for 120 log cabins on a site next to Waldringfield Road. The rejection was on the grounds that it was too near the Area of Outstanding Natural Beauty amongst other reasons, and would result in an unacceptable increase in visitor numbers to a sensitive areas. BT initially objected on the grounds that it would interfere with their radio test area, although they subsequently withdrew their objection provided the developer created a protective earth bund, rejected by SCDC. BT subsequently lodged a planning application for 2000 houses to be built. At its closest, the site comes within 88 metres (289 ft) of an Area of Outstanding Natural Beauty, and there are several Site of Special Scientific Interest close by, such as Newbourne Springs. In April 2018, SCDC (subsequently merged with a neighbouring council to become East Suffolk District Council) gave outline permission for the development, which is now named Brightwell Lakes.

== See also ==
- BT Research
