= North Runcton =

Village in Norfolk, England

Coordinates: 52.71651°N 0.43512°E

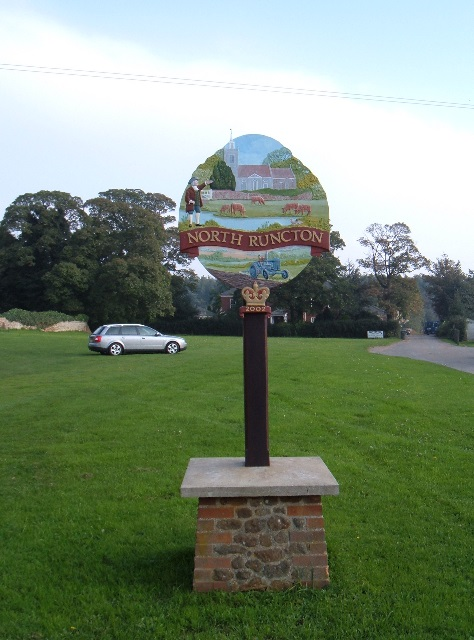
- The village sign, North Runcton, Norfolk

- Location within Norfolk
- Area: 5.99 km^{2} (2.31 sq mi)
- Population: 549 (parish, 2011 census)
  - Density: 92/km^{2} (240/sq mi)
- OS grid reference: TF5103
  - London: 102 miles (164 km)
- Civil parish: North Runcton
- District: King's Lynn and West Norfolk
- Shire county: Norfolk
- Region: East
- Country: England
- Sovereign state: United Kingdom
- Post town: KING'S LYNN
- Postcode district: PE33
- Dialling code: 01553
- Police: Norfolk
- Fire: Norfolk
- Ambulance: East of England
- UK Parliament: North West Norfolk

North Runcton is a village and a civil parish in the English county of Norfolk. The village is 43.2 miles (69.5 km) west of Norwich, 4.3 miles (6.9 km) south-south-east of King's Lynn and 102 miles (164 km) north of London. The village is located a small distance south-west of the A47 between King's Lynn and Swaffham. The nearest railway station is at King's Lynn for the Fen Line which runs between King's Lynn and Cambridge. The nearest airport is Norwich International Airport. The parish of North Runcton in the 2001 census, has a population of 266, increasing to 549 at the 2011 Census. For the purposes of local government, the parish falls within the district of King's Lynn and West Norfolk.

== Description ==
The parish of North Runcton is situated in the west of Norfolk, and is 4.3 miles (6.9 km) directly southeast of the town of King's Lynn. The name North Runcton is thought to originate from the Old English for settlement at the north bridge, or northern settlement at the bridge. The village is close to the village of West Winch, which is 1-mile (1.6 km) west along Rectory Lane.

Half a mile from the village green is the junction with the A47. The road south from the common leads to Setchey 2 miles (3.2 km) away. Other nearby villages include Middleton and Blackborough End. The village surrounded by arable farmland. In the centre of the village is the green and All Saints' parish church. Also on the green are the buildings which used to house the school and the post office which closed in October 1975. The village school closed in July 1983 but the building now serves as the village meeting place and is also holds a nursery which opened 1996.

As a boy, the English actor Michael Caine was evacuated to North Runcton from London during World War II.

== History ==
=== Roman period ===
Evidence suggests that there had been a settlement in the parish during the Roman period. Crop marks visible on archaeology oblique aerial photographs taken in 1976 showed a complex series of features including rectangular and sub-rounded enclosures, linear features and pits. Evidence to back Roman occupation have been backed up with archaeological finds which have includes a bracelet, coins, a dolphin brooch and a plate brooch.

=== Anglo-Saxons ===
During the 1920s and '30s archaeologist unearthed an Anglo-Saxon burial containing beads and a brooch within the parish. Also discovered and excavated was an early Anglo-Saxon cremation cemetery. A few metal objects have also been recovered from the parish including a late Anglo-Saxon stirrup strap of an unusual form found at Brooke Farm.

=== The Normans and the Domesday Book ===
North Runcton has an entry in the Domesday Book of 1086 where its population, land ownership and productive resources were extensively detailed In the great book North Runcton is recorded by the name of Runghetuna and Rynghetona. The main tenants being Hermer de Ferrers and William d'Ecouis. The survey also records always 11 villagers, 7 smallholders, 2 slaves, meadow, 30 acres (12 ha). Always 2 ploughs in lordship, 1 men's plough, 1½ mills.

In the Domesday survey fractions were used to indicate that the entry, in this case a mill was situated within more than one parish, woodland at 20 pigs, 4 salt-houses and one third of a fifth. Always 1 cob, 4 head of cattle, 27 pigs, 100 sheep. 1 church, 30 acres (120,000 m^{2}). 13 Freemen appertain to this manor, 37 acres (15 ha). Always 1 plough. Value always £6 4s 0d. The whole has 1 league in length and in width, of a 20s King's tax, it pays 12d. West Winch is in this measurement.

== All Saints' Parish Church ==
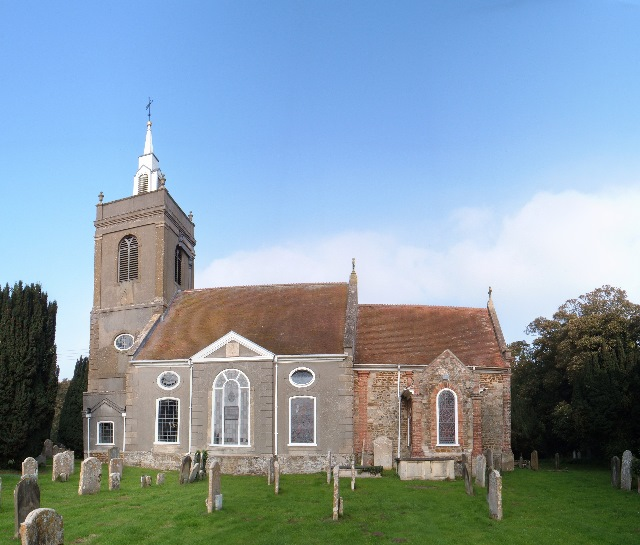
All Saints' Parish Church, North Runcton

All Saints' Church was built by the architect Henry Bell, a contemporary of Christopher Wren, who also built the Custom House in King's Lynn. At the time Bell lived within the parish at North Runcton Hall. The church is built on the site of the previous church, which was flattened when the tower collapsed in 1701. Most of the exterior is constructed from brick and carrstone, but earlier Norman and possibly Anglo-Saxon materials have been incorporated.

Four Ionic columns support the domed roof with other columns supporting the tripartite chancel arch. The reredos panelling is the work of Bell. The tower has been re-built from Norman materials with carved fragments that might be older. The church was extended and altered in the late 19th century. The church's internal furnishings date from the 1713 reconstruction by Bell. The font is from St Margaret's, King's Lynn. Bell had died in 1711, two years before the work was completed. It is a Grade I listed building. In the 19th century the advowson was "in the gift" of Trinity College, Cambridge and the banker, Daniel Gurney. Appointments as rector included the Astronomer Royal, Nevil Maskelyne, chemist James Cumming and, as curate, the chemistry professor Joseph George Cumming.

== Governance ==
North Runcton is a parish of the Kings Lynn and West Norfolk district council, which is responsible for the most local services. Norfolk County Council is responsible for roads, some schools and social services. For Westminster elections the parish forms part of the North West Norfolk constituency, represented by James Wild (Conservative).
