= Turnpike trusts in the East of England =

Historic road maintenance bodies in England

This is a list of turnpike trusts that maintained roads in the East of England.

Between 1663 and 1836, the Parliament of Great Britain and the Parliament of the United Kingdom passed a series of acts of Parliament that created organisations – turnpike trusts – that collected road tolls, and used the money to repair the road. These applied to major roads, around a fifth of the road network. The turnpike system was phased out in the 1870s, and major roads transitioned in the 1880s to the maintenance of the new county councils.

The counties used for these lists are the historic counties of England that existed at the time of the turnpike trusts. This article lists those in the east of England: Bedfordshire, Cambridgeshire, Essex, Hertfordshire, Huntingdonshire, Norfolk and Suffolk.

== Bedfordshire ==
Trust	Founded	Initial act	
Trust	Founded	Citation	Title
Barford Turnpike Trust; Cardington to Temsford Bridge Turnpike Trust	1772	12 Geo. 3. c. 107	Bedford Roads (No. 2) Act 1772; An Act for repairing and widening the Road from the Forty-eighth Mile Stone, in the Parish of Cardington, in the present Turnpike Road between Hitchin and Bedford, to Great Barford Bridge; and for continuing a Road from thence to the Great Northern Road near Temsford Bridge, in the County of Bedford.
Bedford and Kimbolton Turnpike Trust	1795	35 Geo. 3. c. 148	Bedford to Kimbolton Road Act 1795; An Act for repairing, widening, and altering, the road leading from The Way Post, at the north-east end of the town of Bedford, in the county of Bedford, to the north-east end of a lane, in the parish of Kimbolton, in the county of Huntingdon, called The Park Lane.
Bedford and Luton Turnpike Trust	1726	13 Geo. 1. c. 17	Luton and Saint Albans Road Act 1726; An Act for amending and repairing the Road from Luton, in the County of Bedford, to Westwood Gate, in the said County.
Bedford and Newport Pagnell Turnpike Trust; Bedford to Sherrington Turnpike Trust	1754	27 Geo. 2. c. 34	Bedford and Buckinghamshire Roads (No. 2) Act 1754; An Act for repairing and widening the High Road, from a Place called Saint Loyds, in the Town of Bedford, through the Parishes of Bromham, Stagsden, Astwood, Hardmead, and Chichley, to the Way Post in Sherrington Field, where the said Road joins the High Road from the Town of Olney to the Town of Newport Pagnell; and also the High Road from Bromham aforesaid, through the Parishes of Turvey and Colebrayfield, to the Town of Launden, otherwise Lavenden, in the Counties of Bedford and Buckingham; and for applying Part of the Money arising thereby, towards repairing, re-building, or widening, Sherrington Bridge, in the Road from the said Way Post to the Town of Newport Pagnell.
Bedford and Woburn Turnpike Trust	1777	17 Geo. 3. c. 94	Bedford Roads Act 1777; An Act for repairing and widening the Road from Stall-gate Close, at the South-west End of the Town of Bedford, to the Town of Ampthill, and from the said Town of Ampthill to Woburn Park, in the County of Bedford; and also the Road branching out of the same, in Kempston Field, to the Turnpike Road leading from Hitchin to the said Town of Bedford.
Biggleswade to Alconbury Hill Turnpike Trust	1724	11 Geo. 1. c. 20	Bedfordshire Roads Act 1724; An Act for repairing and amending the Road from Biggleswade, in the County of Bedford, to Bugden, and through Alconberry, to the Top of Alconberry Hill, or Cross Post leading into Sautery Lane, on the York and Edinburgh Road; and from the said Town of Bugden, to the Town of Huntingdon; and from Cross Hall, in Eaton Sokon, in the said County of Bedford, to Great Stoughton Common, in the said County of Huntingdon.
Great Staughton to Lavendon Turnpike Trust	1802	42 Geo. 3. c. lxiv	Road from Great Staughton to Lavendon Act 1802; An Act for repairing, widening, and altering the Road leading from the South End of Brown's Lane, in the Parish of Great Staughton, in the County of Huntingdon, to the Bedford Turnpike Road in the Parish of Lavendon, in the County of Buckingham.
Hitchin and Bedford Turnpike Trust	1757	30 Geo. 2. c. 43	Hertford and Bedford Roads Act 1757; An Act for amending, widening, and keeping in Repair, the Road from the Town of Hitchin in the County of Hertford, through the Town of Shefford and Carrington Cotton End, to a Lane opposite a Farm-house called Saint Leonard's, leading into the Turnpike Road from St. Alban's to the Town of Bedford; and also the Road from the Turning out of the aforesaid Road into Henlow Field to Gerford Bridge; and also the Road from the Town of Henlow, over Henlow Bridge, to Arlesey in the County of Bedford.
Hockliffe and Woburn Turnpike Trust	1706	6 Ann. c. 13	Bedfordshire Highways Act 1706; An Act for repairing the Highway between Hockliffe and Wooborne, in the County of Bedford.
Luton District Turnpike Trust	1726	13 Geo. 1. c. 17	Luton and Saint Albans Road Act 1726; An Act for amending and repairing the Road from Luton, in the County of Bedford, to Westwood Gate, in the said County.
Potton Road Turnpike Trust	1814	54 Geo. 3. c. clxxx	Road from Potton to the Gamlingay and Eynesbury Road Act 1814; An Act for repairing the Road from Potton in the County of Bedford, and Gamlingay in the County of Cambridge, to Eynesbury in the County of Huntingdon.
Puddlehill Turnpike Trust	1710	9 Ann. c. 34	Dunstable Highways Act 1710; An Act for repairing the Highways between Dunstable and Hockley, in the County of Bedford.

== Cambridgeshire ==
Trust	Founded	Initial act	
Trust	Founded	Citation	Title
Arrington Turnpike Trust	1797	37 Geo. 3. c. 179	Cambridge and Arrington Roads Act 1797; An Act for amending, altering, improving, and keeping in repair, the road leading from the town of Cambridge, into the old north road near Arrington Bridge, all in the county of Cambridge.
Cambridge to Ely and Soham (South District) Turnpike Trust	1763	3 Geo. 3. c. 36	Cambridge and Ely Roads Act 1763; An Act for repairing, widening, turning, and keeping in Repair, the Road from the Town of Cambridge to Ely, and from thence to Soham; and for building a Bridge cross the River Ouze, at or near a Place called Stretham Ferry, in the County of Cambridge.
Hauxton and Dunsbridge Turnpike Trust	1724	11 Geo. 1. c. 14	Cambridge Roads Act 1724; An Act for repairing part of the Road from London to Cambridge, beginning at the End of the Parish of Foulmire, in the said County, next to Barly, in the County of Hertford, and ending at the Pavement in Trumpington Street, in the Town of Cambridge.
Littleport to Welney (North West District) Turnpike Trust	1824	5 Geo. 4. c. lx	Cambridge and Ely Roads Act 1824; An Act for amending and improving the Road from Cambridge to Ely, and other Roads therein mentioned, in the County of Cambridge; and for making a Road from or near the Town of Littleport in the Isle of Ely, to the Ferry or Floating Bridge over the Hundred Feet River, in the Parish of Welney in the County of Norfolk.
Newmarket Heath Turnpike Trust	1723	10 Geo. 1. c. 12	Cambridge Roads Act 1723; An Act for repairing the Roads leading from Stump Cross, in the Parish of Chesterford, in the County of Essex, to Newmarket Heath, and the Town of Cambridge, in the County of Cambridge.
Newmarket Heath Turnpike Trust	1763	3 Geo. 3. c. 32	Newmarket and Cambridge Road Act 1763; An Act for repairing the Roads from Newmarket, over Newmarket Heath, to the Turnpike Road leading to Stump Cross, in the Counties of Cambridge and Suffolk.
Paper Mills Turnpike Trust	1744	18 Geo. 2. c. 23	Huntingdonshire and Cambridgeshire Roads Act 1744; An Act to repair and widen the Road leading from Godmanchester, in the County of Huntingdon, through Fen-Stanton and Cambridge, to the First Rubbing-House on Newmarket Heath, in the County of Cambridge.
Paper Mills Turnpike Trust	1815	55 Geo. 3. c. xlix	Cambridge to Newmarket Heath Road Act 1815; An Act for more effectually repairing the Road from Jesus Lane in the Town of Cambridge, to Newmarket Heath, in the County of Cambridge.
Red Cross Turnpike Trust; Haverhill to Shelford Turnpike Trust	1766	6 Geo. 3. c. 84	Cambridge Roads Act 1766; An Act for repairing and widening the Road leading from the present Turnpike Road at Haverhill to Red Cross in the Parish of Shelford, in the County of Cambridge.
Royston to Wandesford Bridge (South District) Turnpike Trust	1710	9 Ann. c. 14	Royston and Wandesford Bridge Road Act 1710; An Act for repairing and amending the Highways leading from Royston, in the County of Hertford, to Wandesford Bridge, in the County of Huntington.
St Neots to Cambridge Turnpike Trust	1772	12 Geo. 3. c. 90	St. Neots to Cambridge Road Act 1772; An Act for repairing and widening the Road from the West End of Saint Ive's Lane, in the Town of Saint Neot's, in the County of Huntingdon, to the Pavement at the End of Bell Lane in the Town of Cambridge.
Stump Cross Turnpike Trust	1723	10 Geo. 1. c. 12	Cambridge Roads Act 1723; An Act for repairing the Roads leading from Stump Cross, in the Parish of Chesterford, in the County of Essex, to Newmarket Heath, and the Town of Cambridge, in the County of Cambridge.
Stump Cross Turnpike Trust	1765	5 Geo. 3. c. 74	Cambridge Roads Act 1765; An Act for enlarging the Powers of several Acts, for repairing the Road from Stump Cross to Newmarket Heath, and from the Town of Cambridge, and from Foulmire to Cambridge, and other Roads adjoining thereto, so far as the same relate to the Road from Foulmire to Cambridge, and the said other Roads adjoining thereto.
Wisbech Turnpike Trust			
Wisbech and Thorney Turnpike Trust	1810	50 Geo. 3. c. lxxiv	Wisbech and Thorney Road Act 1810; An Act for making and maintaining a Turnpike Road from the Town of Wisbech in the Isle of Ely, in the County of Cambridge, to the Town of Thorney in the same Isle and County.
Wrestlingworth and Potton Turnpike Trust; Wimpole, Wrestlingworth and Potton Turnpike Trust	1826	7 Geo. 4. c. xxix	Wimpole and Potton Road (Cambridgeshire, Bedfordshire) Act 1826; An Act for making and maintaining a Turnpike Road from Wimpole in the County of Cambridge to Wrestlingworth in the County of Bedford, and from Wrestlingworth to Potton, both in the said County of Bedford.

== Essex ==
Trust	Founded	Initial act	
Trust	Founded	Citation	Title
Barking and Tibury Fort Road Turnpike Trust	1808	48 Geo. 3. c. xcii	Tilbury Fort Road Act 1808; An Act for making and maintaining a Road from the Romford and Whitechapel Road, to or near to Tilbury Fort, in the County of Essex.
Chelmsford Turnpike Trust	1695	7 & 8 Will. 3. c. 9	London to Harwich Roads Act 1695; An Act for repairing the Highways betweene the City of London and the Towne of Harwich in the County of Essex.
Coggeshall and Bocking Turnpike Trust	1765	5 Geo. 3. c. 60	Essex, Suffolk, and Hertford Roads Act 1765; An Act for continuing and rendering more effectual Two Acts, passed in the Twelfth Year of King George the First, and the Twentieth of His late Majesty, for repairing the several Roads therein mentioned, in the Counties of Essex and Suffolk; and for repairing and widening several other Roads, in the Counties of Essex and Hertford.
Colchester Turnpike Trust	1695	7 & 8 Will. 3. c. 9	London to Harwich Roads Act 1695; An Act for repairing the Highways betweene the City of London and the Towne of Harwich in the County of Essex.
Dunmow Turnpike Trust	1725	12 Geo. 1. c. 23	Essex Roads Act 1725; An Act for repairing the Roads leading from the Western Part of the Parish of Shenfield to Harwich, in the County of Essex; and the Road leading from Chelmsford, in the said County, to Sudbury, in the County of Suffolk; and from Margreting to Malden, in the County of Essex; and from Colchester to Langham, in the same County.
Epping and Ongar Turnpike Trust	1787	27 Geo. 3. c. 69	Epping and Ongar Road Act 1787; An Act for continuing and enlarging the Term and Powers of several Acts made in the Tenth Year of the Reign of King George the First, the Sixteenth Year of the Reign of King George the Second, and the Ninth Year of the Reign of His present Majesty, for repairing the Road from the North Part of Harlow Bush Common in the Parish of Harlow, to Woodford in the County of Essex; and for repairing and widening the Road from Epping through the Parishes of Northweald Bassett, Bobbingworth, High Ongar, Chipping Ongar, and Shelley, to the Four Want Way in the said Parish of Shelley, and from thence through the Parishes of High Ongar and Norton Mandeville to the Parish of Writtle in the said County.
Essex Second District Turnpike Trust	1695	7 & 8 Will. 3. c. 9	London to Harwich Roads Act 1695; An Act for repairing the Highways betweene the City of London and the Towne of Harwich in the County of Essex.
Halsted Turnpike Trust	1725	12 Geo. 1. c. 23	Essex Roads Act 1725; An Act for repairing the Roads leading from the Western Part of the Parish of Shenfield to Harwich, in the County of Essex; and the Road leading from Chelmsford, in the said County, to Sudbury, in the County of Suffolk; and from Margreting to Malden, in the County of Essex; and from Colchester to Langham, in the same County.
Hockerill Turnpike Trust	1743	17 Geo. 2. c. 9	Essex and Hertfordshire Roads Act 1743; An Act for repairing and widening the Road leading from a Place called Harlow Bush Common, in the Parish of Harlow, in the County of Essex, to Stump Cross, in the Parish of Great Chesterford, in the said County.
Middlesex and Essex Turnpike Trust	1721	8 Geo. 1. c. 30	Whitechapel Highways Act 1721; An Act for repairing the Highways from The Stones-end at White Chappel Church, in the County of Middlesex, to Shenfield, and to the furthermost Part of the Parish of Woodford, leading to the Town of Epping, in the County of Essex.
Notley Turnpike Trust	1725	12 Geo. 1. c. 23	Essex Roads Act 1725; An Act for repairing the Roads leading from the Western Part of the Parish of Shenfield to Harwich, in the County of Essex; and the Road leading from Chelmsford, in the said County, to Sudbury, in the County of Suffolk; and from Margreting to Malden, in the County of Essex; and from Colchester to Langham, in the same County.
Rochford Hundred Turnpike Trust	1746	20 Geo. 2. c. 7	Essex Roads Act 1746; An Act for enlarging the Term and Powers granted by an Act, passed in the Twelfth Year of the Reign of His late Majesty King George the First, intituled, "An Act for repairing the Roads leading from the Western Part of the Parish of Shenfield to Harwich, in the County of Essex, and the Road leading from Chelmsford, in the said County, to Sudbury, in the County of Suffolk, and from Margretting to Malden, in the County of Essex, and from Colchester to Langham, in the same County," and for repairing other Roads adjoining to the same Roads.
Shenfield to Harwich Turnpike Trust	1695	7 & 8 Will. 3. c. 9	London to Harwich Roads Act 1695; An Act for repairing the Highways betweene the City of London and the Towne of Harwich in the County of Essex.
Thundersley to Hornden Turnpike Trust	1793	33 Geo. 3. c. 149	Essex Roads (No. 2) Act 1793; An Act for repairing and widening the Roads from Hadley Turnpike Gate to Stifford Bridge, and from a Farm House called Tarpotts, to the Town of South Benfleet, and from the Pound in the Town of Brentwood to Tilbury Fort, and from Billericay to Horndon-on-the-Hill, and from Stanford Bridge to Purfleet, in the County of Essex.

== Hertfordshire ==
Trust	Founded	Initial act	
Trust	Founded	Citation	Title
Baldock and Bournbridge Turnpike Trust	1769	9 Geo. 3. c. 86	Hertford and Cambridge Roads Act 1769; An Act for repairing the Roads leading from the Turnpike Road in Tring, in the County of Hertford, through Dunstable, Hitchin, Baldick, and Royston, to the Turnpike Road at or near Bourn Bridge, and from the West End of Wellbury Lane to the Turnpike Road at the South End of Barton, in the Counties of Hertford, Bucks, Bedford, and Cambridge.
Cheshunt Turnpike Trust	1724	11 Geo. 1. c. 11	Hertford and Ware Roads Act 1724; An Act for repairing the Roads therein mentioned, from the Parish of Enfield, in the County of Middlesex, to the Town of Hertford, and to the great Bridge in Ware, in the County of Hertford.
Dunstable Turnpike Trust	1722	9 Geo. 1. c. 11	Dunstable Roads Act 1722; An Act for repairing and widening the Road leading from The Black Bull, in Dunstable, in the County of Bedford, to the Way[b] turning out of the said Road up to Shafford House, in the County of Hertford.
Galley Corner to Lemsford Turnpike Trust; Enfield Chase or Galley Corner Turnpike Trust	1730	3 Geo. 2. c. 10	Middlesex and Hertford Roads Act 1729; An Act for repairing the Road leading from Galley Corner, adjoining to Enfield Chase, in the Parish of South Mims, in the County of Middlesex, to Lemsford Mill, in the County of Hertford.
Hockerill Turnpike Trust	1743	17 Geo. 2. c. 9	Essex and Hertfordshire Roads Act 1743; An Act for repairing and widening the Road leading from a Place called Harlow Bush Common, in the Parish of Harlow, in the County of Essex, to Stump Cross, in the Parish of Great Chesterford, in the said County.
Pondyards and Barnet Turnpike Trust; St Albans (Pondyards and Barnet) Turnpike Trust	1714	1 Geo. 1. St. 2. c. 12 Pr.	Hertford and Middlesex Highways Act 1715; An Act for repairing the Highways through the several Parishes of St. Michael, St. Albans, St. Peter, Shenly Ridge, and South Mims, in the Counties of Hertford and Middlesex.
Reading and Hatfield Turnpike Trust	1768	8 Geo. 3. c. 50	Reading and Hatfield Road Act 1768; An Act for repairing, widening, turning, and altering, the Road leading from Reading, in the County of Berks, through Henley, in the County of Oxford; and Great Marlow, Chipping Wycombe, Agmondesham, and Cheynes, in the County of Bucks; and Rickmansworth, Watford, and Saint Albans, to Hatfield, in the County of Hertford; and also the Road leading out of the Said Road at Marlow, over Great Marlow Bridge, through Bysham, to or near the Thirty mile Stone in the Turnpike Road leading from Maidenhead to Reading.
Sparrows Herne Turnpike Trust	1762	2 Geo. 3. c. 63	Hertford and Bucks Roads Act 1762; An Act for amending, widening, altering, and keeping in Repair, the Road from the South End of Sparrow's Herne on Bushey Heath, through the Market Towns of Watford, Berkhampstead Saint Peter's, and Tring, in the County of Hertford, by Pettipher's Elms, to the Turnpike Road at Walton near Aylesbury in the County of Bucks.
Stevenage and Biggleswade Turnpike Trust	1719	6 Geo. 1. c. 25	Stevenage and Biggleswade Road Act 1719; An Act for repairing the Roads from Stevenidge, in the County of Hertford, to Biggleswade, in the County of Bedford.
Wadesmill Turnpike Trust	1663	15 Cha. 2. c. 1	Road Repair (Hertfordshire, Cambridgeshire, and Huntingdonshire) Act 1663; An Act for repairing the Highwayes within the Countyes of Hertford Cambridge and Huntington.
Wadesmill Turnpike Trust	1732	6 Geo. 2. c. 24	Hertfordshire Roads Act 1732; An Act for the more effectual repairing the Roads leading from Wade's Mill, in the County of Hertford, to Barley and Royston, in the said County.
Watton Turnpike Trust	1757	30 Geo. 2. c. 45	Hertford and Broadwater Road Act 1757; An Act for amending, widening, and keeping in Repair, the Roads from the East End of the Town of Hertford in the County of Hertford, through Watton, to Broadwater, and from the Town of Ware, through Watton, to the North End of the Town of Walkern in the said County.
Welwyn Turnpike Trust	1725	12 Geo. 1. c. 10	Hertfordshire Roads Act 1725; An Act for repairing the Roads from Lemsford Mill, in the County of Hertford, to Welwyn, and from thence to Cory's Mill, and from Welwyn (through Codicot) to Hitchin, in the said County; and for enlarging the Term granted by an Act passed in the Sixth Year of the Reign of His present Majesty, for repairing the Roads from Steevenage, in the said County, to Biggleswade, in the County of Bedford.

== Huntingdonshire ==
Trust	Founded	Initial act	
Trust	Founded	Citation	Title
Bury and Stratton Turnpike Trust	1755	28 Geo. 2. c. 35	Bury and Stratton Road Act 1755; An Act for repairing the Road from a certain Place in Bury, in the County of Huntingdon, through Warboys, Old Hurst, Saint Ives, Hilton, Eltisley, Waresley, Gamlingay, and Potton, to a House called The Spread Eagle in Stratton, within the several Counties of Huntingdon, Cambridge, and Bedford.
Godmanchester and Hartford Turnpike Trust	1765	5 Geo. 3. c. 77	Herts and Hunts Roads Act 1765; An Act for enlarging the Terms and Powers of several Acts, of the Ninth and Twelfth Years of Queen Anne, and of the Thirteenth of King George the First, and of the Fourteenth of His late Majesty, for repairing the Highways leading from Royston in the County of Hertford, to Wansford Bridge in the County of Huntingdon, so far as relates to the Middle and South Divisions of Roads comprised in the said Acts; and for amending the Road from the Town of Huntingdon to the Causeway at or near the West End of the Town of Somerham in the said County of Huntingdon.
Godmanchester to Cambridge Turnpike Trust	1744	18 Geo. 2. c. 23	Huntingdonshire and Cambridgeshire Roads Act 1744; An Act to repair and widen the Road leading from Godmanchester, in the County of Huntingdon, through Fen-Stanton and Cambridge, to the First Rubbing-House on Newmarket Heath, in the County of Cambridge.
Kimbolton Turnpike Trust	1755	28 Geo. 2. c. 33	Kimbolton Road Act 1755; An Act for repairing the Road from the North End of Brown's Lane in Great Stoughton in the County of Huntingdon, through Kimbolton and Higham Ferrers, to The Way Post near Wellingborough Bridge in the County of Northampton; and from The Pound in Kimbolton to The Way Post in Great Catworth Field, near Brington Bridge, in the said County of Huntingdon.
Oundle to Alconbury Turnpike Trust	1753	26 Geo. 2. c. 88	Northampton Roads Act 1753; An Act for repairing the Road leading from Oundle in the County of Northampton to Alconbury cum Weston in the County of Huntingdon, from Barnwell in the said County of Northampton to Alconbury cum Weston aforesaid, and from The Mile Brook in Hamerton to Wood Lane End, next the Parish of Great Gidding, in the said County of Huntingdon.
Ramsey to Huntingdon Turnpike Trust	1755	28 Geo. 2. c. 26	Huntingdon Roads Act 1755; An Act for repairing and widening the Road from the High Bridge in the Town of Ramsey, in the County of Huntingdon, through King's Ripton, to the West End of St. Peter's Lane, in the Parish of Saint John, within the Borough of Huntingdon.
Somersham Turnpike Trust	1727	1 Geo. 2. St. 2. c. 4	Huntingdonshire Roads Act 1727; An Act for repairing the Road leading from Chatteris Ferry, which divides the Isle of Ely from the County of Huntingdon, to Hammond's Eau; and from thence to Somersham Bridge, at Somersham Town's End, in the said County.
Stilton Turnpike Trust	1710	9 Ann. c. 14	Hertford and Huntingdon Roads Act 1710; An Act for repairing and amending the Highways leading from Royston, in the County of Hertford, to Wandesford Bridge, in the County of Huntington.

== Norfolk ==
Trust	Founded	Initial act	
Trust	Founded	Citation	Title
Aylsham and Cromer Turnpike Trust	1794	34 Geo. 3. c. 114	Norfolk Roads Act 1794; An act for amending, widening, and keeping in repair the road from Norwich to Aylsham, in the county of Norfolk, and a certain part of the road leading from the said road towards Holt, in the said county.
Downham and Fincham Turnpike Trust	1772	12 Geo. 3. c. 98	Norfolk Roads Act 1772; An Act for repairing and widening the Road leading from the East End of the Bridge across the River Ouze, in Downham Market, to the Queen's Head; and from the Chequer Inn, in Downham Market aforesaid, to the East End of the Two Mile Close, in the Parish of Barton, and towards Watton, to a Place called The Devil's Ditch, in the County of Norfolk; and for stopping up the Road leading from Stradset, through Barton Layes, towards Watton.
Ely to Downham Turnpike Trust	1770	10 Geo. 3. c. 97	Cambridge and Norfolk Roads Act 1770; An Act to extend the Provisions in Two Acts, passed in the Third and Fifth Years of His present Majesty, for repairing the Road from Cambridge to Ely, and from Ely to Littleport, and other Roads therein mentioned, to the Road from Witburton to Mepall; and for making other Provisions for repairing the said Road from Ely to Littleport; and for making and keeping in Repair a Road from Littleport to Chequer Corner in Downham, in the Counties of Cambridge and Norfolk.
Great Yarmouth to Acle and Branches Turnpike Trust; Yarmouth to Acle Turnpike Trust	1830	11 Geo. 4 & 1 Will. 4. c. xxxix	Great Yarmouth and Acle Turnpike Road Act 1830; An Act for making a Turnpike Road from the Bridge over the River Bure at Great Yarmouth to Acle (with certain Branches therefrom), all in the County of Norfolk.
Lynn – East Gate (Dersingham and Hillington) Turnpike Trust; King's Lynn to Hillington Turnpike Trust	1770	10 Geo. 3. c. 86	Norfolk Roads (No. 3) Act 1770; An Act for repairing and widening the Roads from the East Gate, in the Borough of King's Lynn, into the Parishes of Geyton and Grimstone, and to the Gate next Hillington on Congham Common, and to the North End of Babingley Lane, in the County of Norfolk.
Lynn – South Gate Turnpike Trust	1770	10 Geo. 3. c. 85	Norfolk Roads (No. 2) Act 1770; An Act for repairing and widening the several Roads from the South Gate, in the Borough of King's Lynn, into the Parishes of East Walton, Narborough, Stoke Ferry, and Downham Market, in the County of Norfolk.
Lynn and Wisbech Turnpike Trust	1765	5 Geo. 3. c. 101	Norfolk Roads (No. 2) Act 1765; An Act for repairing and widening the Roads from the Little Bridge, over the End of the Drain next Wisbech River, lying between Roper's Fields and The Bell Inn in Wisbech, in the Isle of Ely, to the Sign of The Bear in Walsoken, in the County of Norfolk; and from Walsoken Bridge (lying over the same Drain) to the said Sign of The Bear, and to Lord's Bridge in Islington, and from thence to the West Ends of Maudlin Bridge and German's Bridge, in the County of Norfolk; and from the East End of German's Bridge aforesaid to the West End of Long Budge in South Lynn, in the Borough of King’s Lynn, in the said County of Norfolk; and from Islington aforesaid to Cross Keys Wash in the said County.
New Buckenham Turnpike Trust	1772	12 Geo. 3. c. 95	Norwich to New Buckenham Road Act 1772; An Act for amending and widening the Road from Berstreet Gates, in the City of Norwich, to New Buckenham, in the County of Norfolk.
North Walsham Turnpike Trust	1797	37 Geo. 3. c. 147	Norwich and North Walsham Road Act 1797; An Act for amending, widening, and keeping in repair, the road from Magdalen Gate, in the city of Norwich, to the King's Arms Inn, in North Walsham, in the county of Norfolk.
Norwich and Fakenham Turnpike Trust	1823	4 Geo. 4. c. lxxx	Road from Norwich to Fakenham Act 1823; An Act for making and maintaining a Road from Norwich to Fakenham in the County of Norfolk.
Norwich and Scole Turnpike Trust	1769	9 Geo. 3. c. 66	Norwich to Scole Bridge Road Act 1769; An Act for repairing and widening the Road from the City of Norwich to Scole Bridge, in the County of Norfolk.
Norwich and Swaffham Turnpike Trust; Norwich, Mattishall and Swaffham Turnpike Trust	1770	10 Geo. 3. c. 67	Norwich and Swaffham Road Act 1770; An Act for amending and widening the Road from Saint Benedict's Gate, in the County of the City of Norwich, to Swaffham, in the County of Norfolk; and from Halfpenny Bridge, in Honingham, to the Bounds of Yaxham; and also a Lane, called Hangman's Lane, near the Gates of the said City.
Norwich and Watton Turnpike Trust	1770	10 Geo. 3. c. 77	Norwich and Watton Road Act 1770; An Act for amending and widening the Road from Saint Stephen's Gate, in the County of the City of Norwich, to the Windmill in the Town of Watton, in the County of Norfolk.
Norwich and Yarmouth Turnpike Trust	1769	9 Geo. 3. c. 68	Norwich to Yarmouth Road Act 1769; An Act for amending the Road from Bishops-gate Bridge in the City of Norwich, to a Stone formerly called The Two Mile Stone, where the Norwich Road joins the Caister Causeway, Two Miles and a Half short of the Town of Great Yarmouth.
Norwich to Block Hill Turnpike Trust	1770	10 Geo. 3. c. 54	Norwich to Trowse Road Act 1770; An Act for amending the Road from Saint Stephen's Gate in the City of Norwich, to Block Hill in Trowse, at the Angle where the Road divides to Bixley and Kirby in the County of Norfolk.
Stoke Ferry Turnpike Trust	1770	10 Geo. 3. c. 78	Stoke Ferry Roads Act 1770; An Act for amending and widening several Roads leading from the Bell in Stoke Ferry, in the County of Norfolk.
Thetford (to Norwich) Turnpike Trust	1695	7 & 8 Will. 3. c. 26	Norfolk Roads Act 1695; An Act for repaireing the High-wayes betweene Wymondham and Attleborough in the County of Norfolk.
Wells to Fakenham Turnpike Trust	1826	7 Geo. 4. c. cxxxvi	Wells next the Sea and Fakenham Turnpike Road Act 1826; An Act for making a Turnpike Road from Wells next the Sea to Fakenham, with a Branch therefrom, all in the County of Norfolk.

== Suffolk ==
Trust	Founded	Initial act	
Trust	Founded	Citation	Title
Aldeburgh to Yoxford Turnpike Trust; Aldburgh to Yoxford, Saxmundham and Benhall Turnpike Trust	1792	32 Geo. 3. c. 126	Suffolk Roads Act 1792; An Act for amending, widening and keeping in Repair the several Roads or Branches of Road leading from the Parishes of Yoxford, Saxmundbam, and Benhall, in the County of Suffolk, to the Town of Aldeburgh, in the said County.
Brandon and Barton Turnpike Trust	1770	10 Geo. 3. c. 65	Barton and Brandon Road Act 1770; An Act for repairing the Road from the Bridge on the Old River at Barton to Brandon Bridge, in the County of Suffolk.
Bury St Edmunds and Newmarket Turnpike Trust	1770	10 Geo. 3. c. 96	Suffolk and Cambridge Roads Act 1770; An Act for repairing and widening the Roads from the Borough of Bury Saint Edmunds to the Town of Newmarket, in the Counties of Suffolk and Cambridge; and from the South End of The Ferry Street in Brandon to Bury Saint Edmunds, in the said County of Suffolk.
Bury St Edmunds to Cranwich Turnpike Trust	1792	32 Geo. 3. c. 148	Norfolk Roads Act 1792; An Act for repairing and improving the Road leading from the Town of Bury Saint Edmunds, in the County of Suffolk, to and through the Town of Thetford, in the Counties of Norfolk and Suffolk to the present Turnpike Road leading from Lynn, through the Parish of Cranwich, in the said County of Norfolk.
Claydon, Blakenham, Brockford and Stowmarket Turnpike Trust	1711	10 Ann. c. 42	Suffolk Roads Act 1711; An Act for the better repairing and amending the Road leading from Ipswich to Cleydon, and the Road called The Pye Road, in the County of Suffolk.
Haverhill to Shelford Turnpike Trust; Red Cross Turnpike Trust	1766	6 Geo. 3. c. 84	Cambridge Roads Act 1766; An Act for repairing and widening the Road leading from the present Turnpike Road at Haverhill to Red Cross in the Parish of Shelford, in the County of Cambridge.
Ipswich to Helmingham and Debenham Turnpike Trust; Ipswich to Debenham Turnpike Trust; Ipswich to Helmingham Turnpike Trust	1812	52 Geo. 3. c. xxiii	Ipswich and Debenham, and Hemingston and Otley Bottom Roads Act 1812; An Act for repairing the Roads from Ipswich to Helmingham, and to Debenham, and from Hemingston to Otley Bottom, in the County of Suffolk.
Ipswich to South Town, and Darsham to Bungay Turnpike Trust	1785	25 Geo. 3. c. 116	Ipswich to South Town Road Act 1785; An Act for amending and keeping in Repair the Road leading from Ipswich to South Town, and from the said Road at Beech Lane in the Parish of Darsham, to Bungay in the County of Suffolk.
Ipswich to Stratford St Mary Turnpike Trust; Ipswich to Stratford Turnpike Trust	1812	52 Geo. 3. c. xxiv	Road from Ipswich to Stratford St. Mary Act 1812; An Act for repairing the Road from Ipswich to Stratford Saint Mary, in the County of Suffolk.
Lakenheath and Hockwold Turnpike Trust; Mildenhall to Littleport Turnpike Trust (Second District)	1828	9 Geo. 4. c. xliv	Mildenhall and Littleport Road over River Ouse Act 1828; An Act for making and maintaining a Road from Beck Fen Lane, in the Parish of Mildenhall in the County of Suffolk, to the South-east End of the Bridge over the River Ouze in the Parish of Littleport in the Isle of Ely and County of Cambridge, and other Roads therein mentioned, in the Counties of Norfolk and Suffolk.
Little Yarmouth Turnpike Trust	1796	36 Geo. 3. c. 142	Little Yarmouth and Blytheburgh Road Act 1796; An act for amending and keeping in repair the road from the turnpike road in Little Yarmouth to the turnpike road at Blythburgh, and also the road from Brampton to Halesworth, in the county of Suffolk.
Mildenhall Burntfen Turnpike Trust; Mildenhall to Littleport Turnpike Trust (First District)	1828	9 Geo. 4. c. xliv	Mildenhall and Littleport Road over River Ouse Act 1828; An Act for making and maintaining a Road from Beck Fen Lane, in the Parish of Mildenhall in the County of Suffolk, to the South-east End of the Bridge over the River Ouze in the Parish of Littleport in the Isle of Ely and County of Cambridge, and other Roads therein mentioned, in the Counties of Norfolk and Suffolk.
Scole Bridge to Bury St Edmunds Turnpike Trust	1769	9 Geo. 3. c. 67	Scole Bridge to Bury St. Edmunds Road Act 1769; An Act for repairing and widening the Road from Scole Bridge to the Place where the East Gate lately flood in the Town of Bury Saint Edmunds, in the County of Suffolk.
South Town Turnpike Trust	1775	15 Geo. 3. c. 67	Yarmouth to Gorleston Road Act 1775; An Act for amending and widening the Road leading from Yarmouth Bridge, through the Hamlet of South Town, other wife Little Yarmouth, to Gorleston, in the County of Suffolk.
Sudbury to Bury St Edmunds Turnpike Trust	1762	2 Geo. 3. c. 75	Sudbury to Bury St. Edmunds Road Act 1762; An Act for repairing and widening the High Road leading from the North End of Ballingdon Bridge in Sudbury in the County of Suffolk, to the South Gate in Bury Saint Edmunds in the said County.
Thetford and Newmarket Turnpike Trust	1768	8 Geo. 3. c. 55	Thetford and Newmarket Road Act 1768; An Act for amending the Road from Christopher's Bridge, in the Borough of Thetford, in the County of Suffolk, to the North-east End of the Town of New-market in the County of Cambridge.
Woodbridge to Eye Turnpike Trust	1802	42 Geo. 3. c. viii	Woodbridge and Eye Road Act 1802; An Act for repairing, widening, improving and keeping in Repair, the Road leading from the Shire Hall in the Town and Port of Woodbridge, to the Broad Street in the Town and Borough of Eye, in the County of Suffolk.
