= A47 road =

Road in England

A47

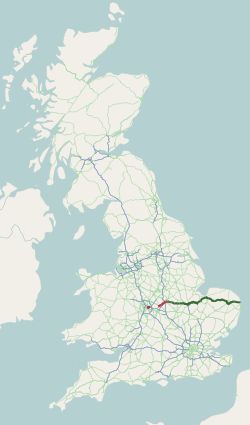

Route information
- Length: 170.8 mi (274.9 km)

Major junctions
- West end: A4540 in Birmingham

- A452 in Birmingham A444 in Nuneaton; A5 in Nuneaton; A6 in Leicester A1 near Peterborough
- East end: A12 in Lowestoft

Location
- Country: United Kingdom
- Counties: West Midlands; Warwickshire; Leicestershire; Rutland; Northamptonshire; Cambridgeshire; Norfolk; Suffolk
- Primary destinations: Nuneaton; Hinckley/Earl Shilton; Leicester; Peterborough; Wisbech; King's Lynn; Swaffham; Dereham; Norwich; Great Yarmouth; Gorleston-on-Sea; Lowestoft

Road network
- Roads in the United Kingdom; Motorways; A and B road zones
← A46	→ A48

The A47 is a major trunk road in England linking Birmingham to Lowestoft, Suffolk, maintained and operated by National Highways. Most of the section between Birmingham and Nuneaton is now classified as the B4114. From Peterborough eastwards, it is a trunk road. (Sections west of the A1 road have been downgraded as alternative roads have been built.)

== History ==
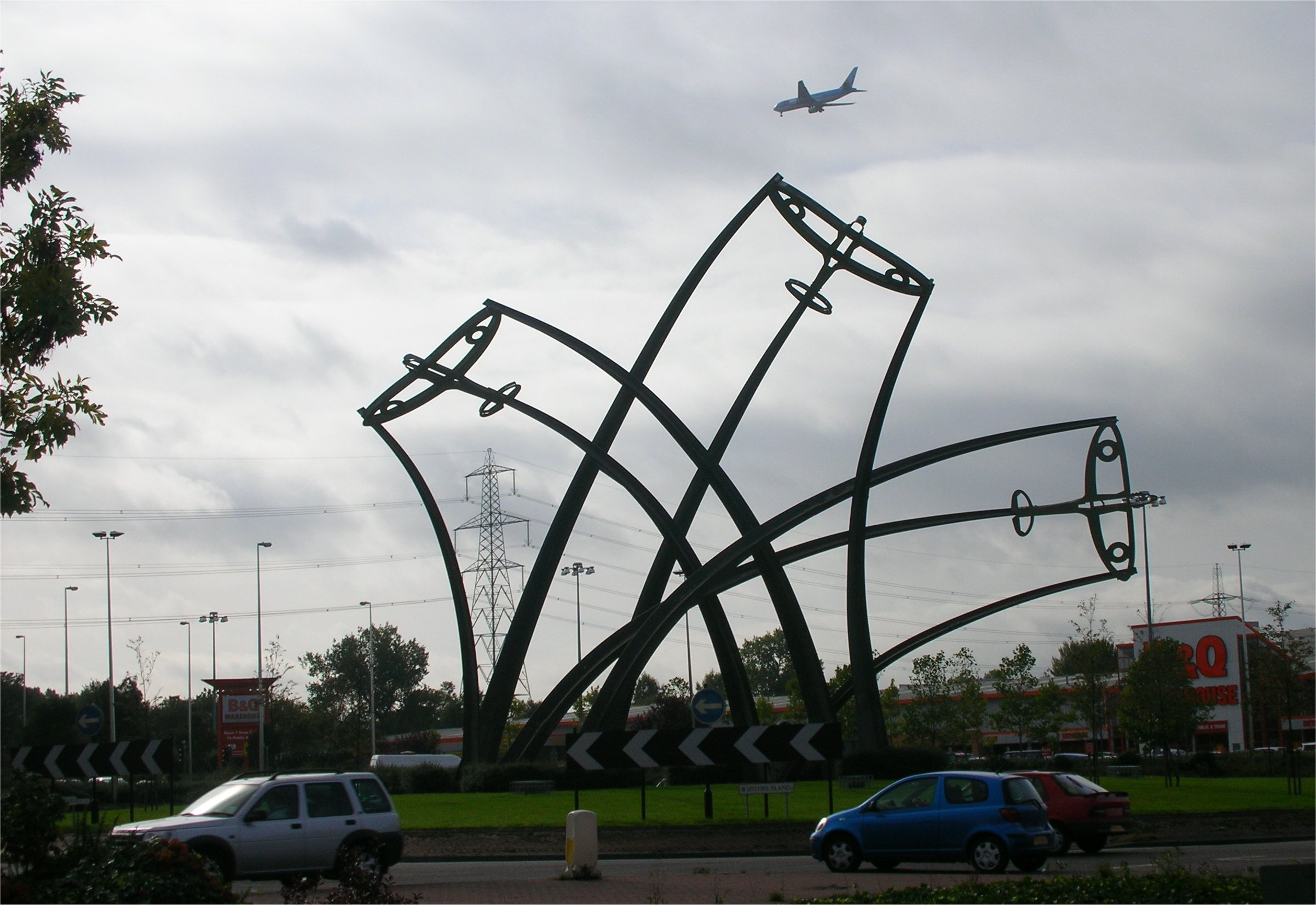
Sentinel by Tim Tolkien near the wartime Spitfire factory at Castle Bromwich

The original (1923) route of the A47 was Birmingham to Great Yarmouth, but some changes were made to its route in the early years. At its eastern end, the A47 originally ran through Filby and Caister-on-Sea, with the Acle Straight bearing the number B1140.

A change took place in 1925. The original route of the A47 between Guyhirn and Wisbech in the Isle of Ely was via Wisbech St Mary, with the direct route being part of the A141. That was because there was no road bridge over the River Nene at Guyhirn and hence no junction between the A47 and the A141. In April 1925 a steel road bridge was opened, and the A47 and the A141 swapped routes between Guyhirn and Wisbech.

The A47 was rerouted along the Acle Straight in 1935, with the old route being renumbered as the A1064 (Acle to Caister-on-Sea) and part of the A149 (Caister to Great Yarmouth). Another change also dates from 1935. The A47 originally ran via Downham Market, not King's Lynn. In 1935, it was rerouted via King's Lynn, replacing part of the A141 (Wisbech to King's Lynn) and part of the A17 (King's Lynn to Swaffham). The old route via Downham Market was renumbered as the A1122 (Outwell to Swaffham) and part of the A1101 (Wisbech to Outwell).

Major improvements were made from the late 1970s until early in the 1990s. The seven-mile (11.3 km) £5 million part-dual-carriageway East Dereham Bypass built on part of the disused railway line was opened in spring 1978 followed by a five-mile (8 km) part-dual-carriageway Swaffham Bypass, costing £5 million, which was opened in June 1981. Bypasses for Uppingham (£1.4 million) and Blofield (£4 million) were opened in 1982 and 1983 respectively. The southern section of the Great Yarmouth Western Bypass was opened in May 1985 and the northern section in March 1986 at a cost of £19 million, followed by improvements to the one-mile (1.6 km) Postwick-Blofield section (£1.2 million), which was opened in November 1987. In 1989 Acle Bypass was completed at a cost of £7.1 million and the £1.2 million East Norton Bypass was opened in December 1990. The three-mile (4.8 km) £9 million East Dereham-North Tuddenham Improvement opened in August 1992 and the £62 million Norwich southern Bypass in September 1992.

Escalating road protests starting with Twyford Down in 1992 and culminating with the Newbury bypass in 1996 (at which more than 1,000 people were arrested) led to more than 300 road schemes being cancelled in November 1995 and to the cancellation of further schemes, including the Thorney bypass, by the new Labour government in 1997.

In 2002 the government announced a new road-building programme, which included the three-mile (4.8 km) dual-carriageway Thorney bypass, which opened on 14 December 2005.

In February 2017 Highways England (now National Highways) redesignated the stretch of the A12 road between Great Yarmouth and Lowestoft as the A47.

== Proposed improvements ==
=== Acle Straight (New Road) ===
A47 Acle Straight (New Road)
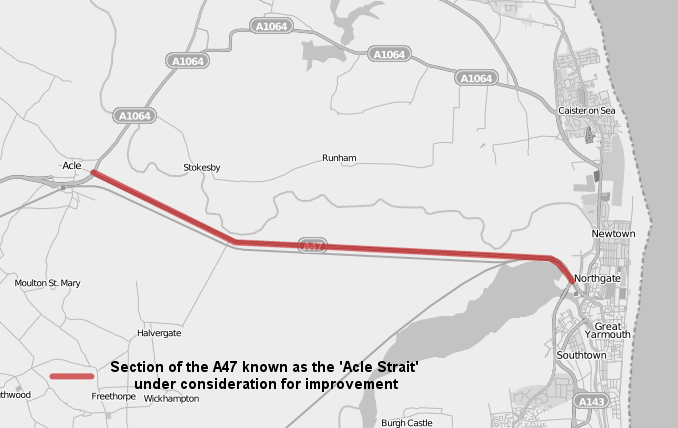
- Route of the proposed A47 Acle Straight scheme
- Location: Norfolk
- Proposer: Norfolk County Council
- Geometry: KML

A study on the A47 which concluded in 2001 looked at improving New Road, i.e. the section of the A47 between Acle and Great Yarmouth known as the Acle Straight. The improvement of the Acle Straight has become a point of contention between interested parties due to its passage through the Norfolk Broads, an area of important ecological and conservation significance that limits development. The study which recommended widening rather than dualling of the Acle Straight was opposed by the Broadland District Council, Great Yarmouth Borough Council, Norfolk Police Authority and the majority of local respondents who believed that dualling of the road is necessary to improve road safety, decrease journey time and support the economic development of Great Yarmouth. Dualling was however strongly opposed by the Environment Agency, the Council for National Parks (CNP) and the Broads Authority due to its impact on biodiversity and internationally important wildlife sites. These parties did cautiously support further investigation into the option for widening following further investigation of its environmental impact.

=== Acle Straight safety improvement scheme ===
In 2006 a programme of safety improvement for the Acle Straight were announced. This would include road resurfacing, better road markings, improved visibility and the installation of safety cameras at an estimated total cost of £1.6 million. The result would then be monitored while long-term improvements, such as widening, are considered.

=== Norwich Northern Distributor Road ===
A £117 million road scheme to the north of Norwich, linking the A1067 and Norwich International Airport to the A47, sponsored and managed by Norfolk County Council. It was priority scheme for Norfolk County Council and it attracted strong opposition both locally and from environmental groups. On 2 June 2015 the scheme was given the go ahead, in 2017 parts of the road were opened with the complete road opened in early 2018.

=== Norwich Western Link ===
A scheme to connect the A47 at Easton with the A1067 at Attlebridge at the end of the Norwich Northern Distributor Road.

=== Improvements around Norwich ===
The two stretches of dual carriageway west and east of Norwich are planned to be dualled by 2027. Although a Development Consent Order (DCO) was granted in 2022, both schemes were subject to legal challenge which have since been dismissed. This caused the overall scheme to be delayed by 20 months. Work began on the North Tuddenham to Easton leg in August 2024 and is due to be finished in 2027. Dualling work on the A47 between Blofield and North Burlingham started in October 2024 and was finished in March 2026.

In addition to the two dualling schemes, National Highways also proposed to improve the Thickthorn Junction, where the A47 meets the A11. This involves the construction of two new free-flow link roads between the A47 and the A11. This project was also the subject of a legal dispute which was since dismissed. In July 2024, the £153 million contract was awarded to Skanska. The scheme is scheduled for completion in 2028.

=== Other proposed improvements ===
In 2012 Norfolk County Council launched the strategic route prospectus which detailed improvement schemes along the A47 between Peterborough and King's Lynn. The list of improvements, costing a total £526 million, included dualling sections of the road and other junction improvements. The sections of the road to be dualled were the Acle straight, Blofield to Burlingham, North Tuddenham to Easton and the East Winch/Middleton bypass. Other improvements detailed were four schemes at Great Yarmouth, including a £112 million third river crossing, four junction improvements along the Norwich Southern Bypass and improvements to the three junctions at King's Lynn.

On 8 October 2012 it was the announced that improvements to the A1/A47 junction at Wansford and the roundabout at Honingham would be approved for pinch point funding. On 1 December 2014 it was announced that a package of improvements to the A47 worth a total of £300 million would be funded during the 2015–20 parliament.

Plans to dual the A47 west of Peterborough between Wansford and Sutton were cancelled by the government in August 2025.

== Route ==
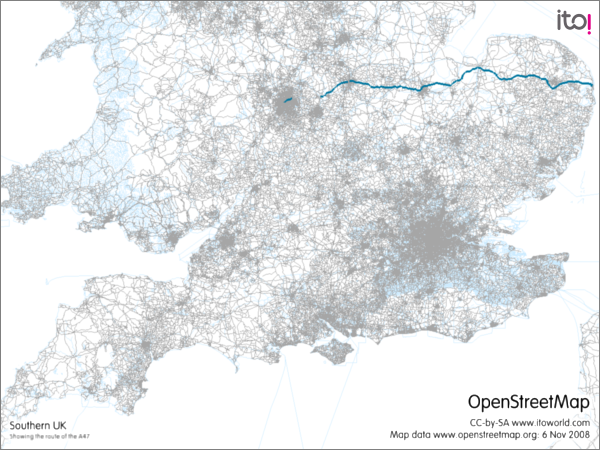
Route of A47, OpenStreetMap

=== Birmingham ===
The Birmingham end of the A47 starts one mile from the centre of Birmingham at the junction with the A4540 Middleway. The traffic light controlled junction was laid out in 2018–19 following the infilling of the Ashted Circus roundabout. The road runs north-east through Vauxhall as Nechells Parkway and then Saltley Road. (Historically it started in the City Centre on High Street.) The road continues north east following the Cross Country Route and River Rea as first Heartlands Parkway and then Fort Parkway. The Birmingham section of the road terminates at Spitfire Island, a roundabout on the A452 halfway between the M6 Junction 5 and A38 Tyburn Island.

The route between Birmingham and Nuneaton was known as the A47 until 1986, when it was renumbered, mainly as the B4114, following the completion of the M42.

=== Nuneaton – Leicester ===
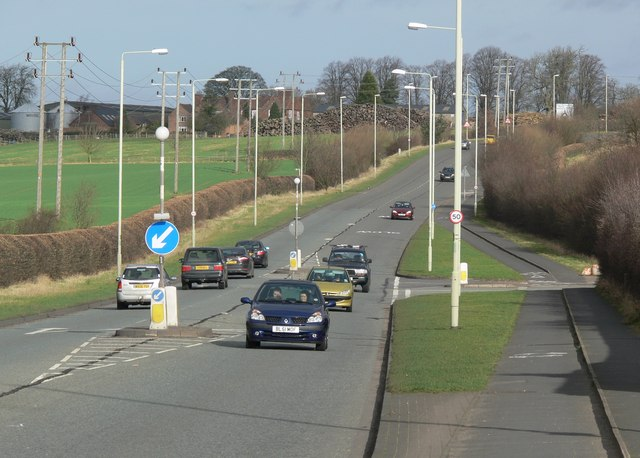
The A47 in Normandy Way, Hinckley

At Nuneaton the road re-emerges as Hinckley Road from a junction with the A444, near the railway station. Leaving Nuneaton, it passes the North Warwickshire and South Leicestershire College, meets the A4254 at a roundabout and the A5 Watling Street near the Longshoot Hotel. It follows the A5 for a half-mile entering Leicestershire and the district of Hinckley and Bosworth, then leaves at a roundabout to bypass Hinckley to the north as Dodwells Road then Normandy Way which was completed in the summer of 1994. This section passes through a large industrial estate and close to a Tesco distribution centre, crossing the Ashby-de-la-Zouch Canal. It meets a roundabout near the Triumph motorbike factory. It bypasses Earl Shilton on its southern side as a single carriageway road. It then runs through Leicester Forest on a line parallel with the M69. It enters Leicester Forest East crossing the M1 near the service station and continues on into the City of Leicester at the B5380 junction. The road continues into the city centre crossing the A563 outer ring-road before becoming part of the inner ring road.

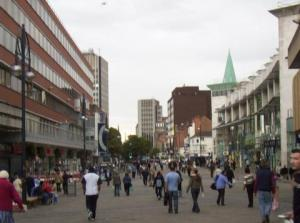
Humberstone Gate in Leicester (ex-A47)

=== Leicester – A1 ===
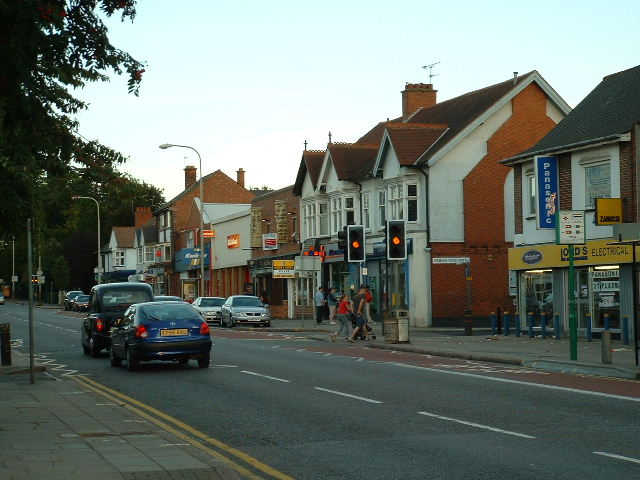
Uppingham Road shops

Leaving Leicester the road becomes Humberstone Road, then Uppingham Road. It passes under the Midland Main Line and meets the B6146 St Barnabas Road to the south, then passes over the former Leicester Belgrave Road to Peterborough North section of the Great Northern Railway which follows the road as far as Houghton on the Hill. At the A6030 crossroads, it becomes part of the Leicester outer ring road in North Evington. At Humberstone, beyond the A563 (outer ring road) and Goodwood Road (projected extension of the outer ring road) crossroads, the road meets the B667 Spencefield Lane to the south, for Evington. Between the Downing Drive junction and Thurnby Hill it enters Leicestershire and the district of Harborough. At Thurnby it meets Station Road to the north, for Scraptoft. Leaving Bushby it climbs Winkadale Hill into the countryside.

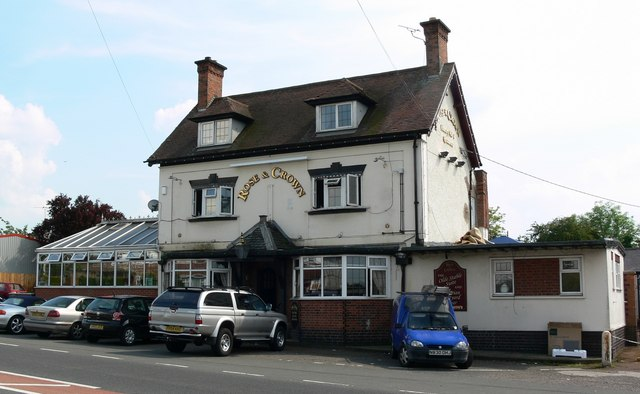
Rose & Crown in Houghton on the Hill

The road travels through Houghton on the Hill, with crossroads for Leicester Airport (to the south) and Old Ingarsby (to the north) next to the Rose and Crown and JET Houghton Garage, and heads down Palace Hill with a right turn for Gaulby, a left turn for Tilton on the Hill, then crosses the River Sence. The two-mile £2.5 million three-lane Billesdon Bypass opened in October 1986, passing north of the village, with staggered crossroads. It meets the B6047 north-south Market Harborough to Melton Mowbray road (for Tilton on the Hill) at staggered crossroads at the highest point of the A47, at around 670 feet. It passes through Skeffington with a right turn for Rolleston then heads through Tugby, which is traversed by the Midshires Way and National Cycle Route 63. It winds its way towards the one-kilometre £1.2 million East Norton Bypass, which opened in December 1990, passing south of the village, with a left turn for Loddington and right turn for Hallaton. Leaving the village, after rejoining the former route, it passes the former railway station. It heads down a hill as three lanes and crosses the Eye Brook and from here the next ten miles are in Rutland, and three lanes become two.

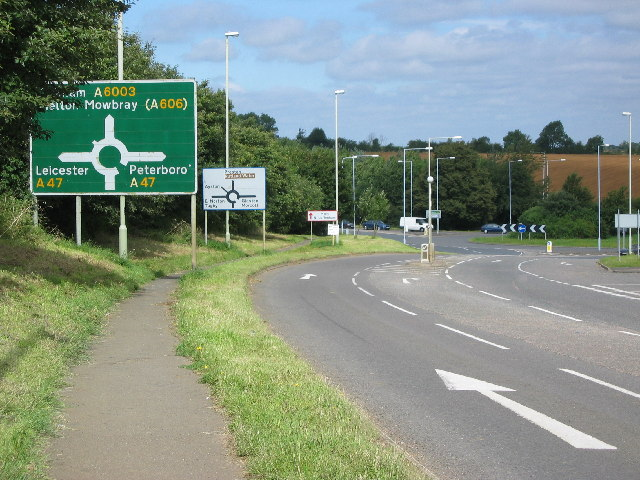
The A6003 roundabout at Ayston

There is a left turn for Belton-in-Rutland and a right turn for Allexton (in Leicestershire) where the road is crossed by the Leicestershire Round and Macmillan Way. The two-mile £1.9 million Wardley Hill Improvement opened in October 1987, and there is a right turn (only) for Wardley, where the road is crossed by the Rutland Round. The road improvement took a less-crooked route closer to the village, with a less steep incline avoiding the top of Wardley Hill. The one-and-a-half-mile £1.4 million Uppingham Bypass opened in June 1982, taking a shorter route north of the town, which is the home of Uppingham School. It meets the A6003 (for Oakham) at a roundabout, and meets the former Glaston Road route and crossroads for Bisbrooke, to the south. It passes through Glaston, with crossroads for Wing (to the north) and Seaton (to the south) near the Old Pheasant. It passes over the tunnel of the Oakham to Kettering Line. Entering Morcott it passes Redwings Lodge, a former Travelodge, and a new cafe restaurant, the Country Lounge originally a Little Chef, on the left and there is a left turn for Morcott, where the road is crossed by the Rutland Round. It meets the A6121 (for Stamford) and B672 (for Caldecott) where it crosses a tunnel of a former railway. At a right turn for Barrowden there is Morcott Windmill, and the road is again crossed by the Rutland Round. There is a crossroads for South Luffenham and Barrowden.

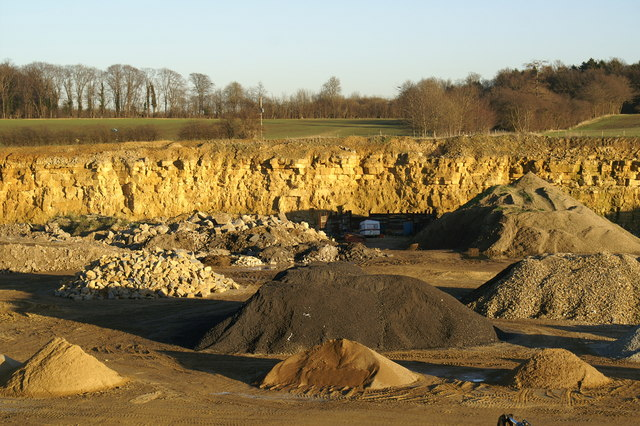
Collyweston quarry

From Shire Oaks (Coppice Leys) through Tixover, the road has been straightened, and to the right is the Welland Valley (Rutland – Northamptonshire boundary). At Tixover there is a crossroads, where the Rutland Round follows the road to the east. The road crosses the River Welland, where the Jurassic Way crosses the road. The Duddington Bypass, where the road enters the district of North Northamptonshire, opened in 1975. This section has a busy roundabout where it meets the south-west/north-east corridor A43. On the northern edge of Collyweston Great Wood, it meets Kingscliffe Road for Collyweston, at the west gate of RAF Wittering. It follows the perimeter fence of the airfield to Collyweston Cross Roads (now no longer crossroads due to the airfield), where there is a right turn for Kings Cliffe. The woodland here is the northern edge of the historic Rockingham Forest. The road towards Wittering Lodge has been straightened, and crosses the City of Peterborough boundary (former Northamptonshire, then Cambridgeshire). At Toll Bar Cottage, there is a left turn for Wittering, opposite Bedford Purlieus National Nature Reserve. The road meets the A1.

=== A1 – Kings Lynn ===
The road formerly went through Wansford, further to the south. The £250,000 dual-carriageway Wansford North Bypass opened in January 1965. There is a right-turn for Sutton. It is crossed by the Roman road Ermine Street. The dual-carriageway £9 million Ailsworth-Castor Bypass opened in September 1991. Around Peterborough, the Peterborough Longthorpe Grade separated junction (GSJ) opened in December 1987 where it meets the A1260. There is a GSJ for Bretton and a Sainsbury's, and it passes the Peterborough City Hospital. The £1.2 million Peterborough Westwood GSJ opened in January 1987 near Ravensthorpe. This section of road is called the Soke Parkway (named after the Soke of Peterborough). When this was first built, in the mid-1970s, the A47 followed what is now the A15 Paston Parkway.

It crosses the East Coast Main Line and meets the A15 at New England near to a Morrisons (former Safeway), and Boulevard and Brotherhood retail parks at Walton to the north and New England to the south. There is another GSJ near Paston to the north and it meets the other strand of the A15 at a GSJ near Gunthorpe. It meets the southern terminus of the new A16 alignment before meeting the A1139 at a roundabout and crossing the Car Dyke. The 3-mile (4.8 km) £7.2 million Eye Bypass opened as Eye Road in October 1991, diverting traffic from the Paston Parkway, and partly built on the former Peterborough to Wisbech railway. There is a local access roundabout at Eye Green near the Esso Eye Green Service Station, a Travelodge and the Peterborough Eye former Little Chef on the right, where it becomes Thorney Road, The Causeway. The landscape becomes very flat known as The Fens. A 3-mile (4.8 km) dual-carriageway bypass of Thorney opened on 14 December 2005. The road meets the B1040 and B1167 at roundabouts. Near Thorney Toll, the road enters Cambridgeshire and the district of Fenland near the New Toll Service Station. The straight road finishes at Guyhirn, meeting the B1187 and crossing on the Tiddy Mun bridge and following the River Nene and the Nene Way. The 1/2-mile (0.80 km) £3.7 million Guyhirn Diversion opened in October 1990. The road heads north-east, following the east bank of the River Nene. The 5-mile (8.0 km) £6 million Wisbech/West Walton Bypass opened in autumn 1984. The former route leaves as the B198 at a roundabout. It meets a level crossing, and it enters Norfolk and the district of King's Lynn and West Norfolk just before a roundabout with the A1101 for Elm and Emneth at the Elme Hall Hotel. It passes the Total Wisbech Services and then meets the old route (B198) at a roundabout and becomes the 6-mile (9.7 km) £23 million dual-carriageway Walpole Highway/Tilney High End Bypass which opened in summer 1996. There is an exit for Walpole Highway, and another for Terrington St John. It passes near Tilney High End. Near Tilney All Saints, it meets the old route at a roundabout, becoming the single carriageway Main Road, then Pullover Road. It meets the end of the A17 at the "Pullover Roundabout" where the West Lynn Little Chef is located.

=== King's Lynn – Great Yarmouth ===
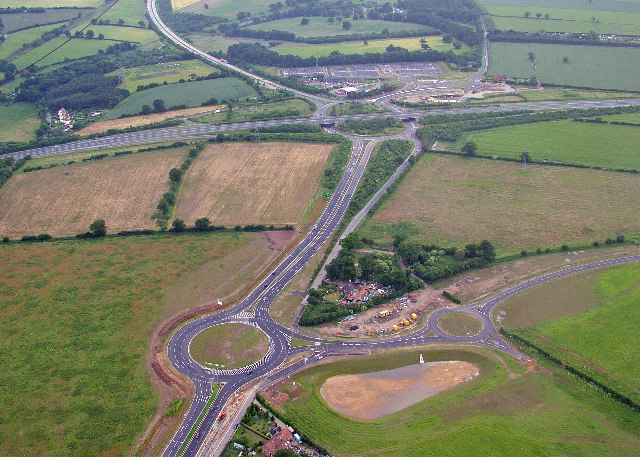
Thickthorn Junction between the A47 and A11.

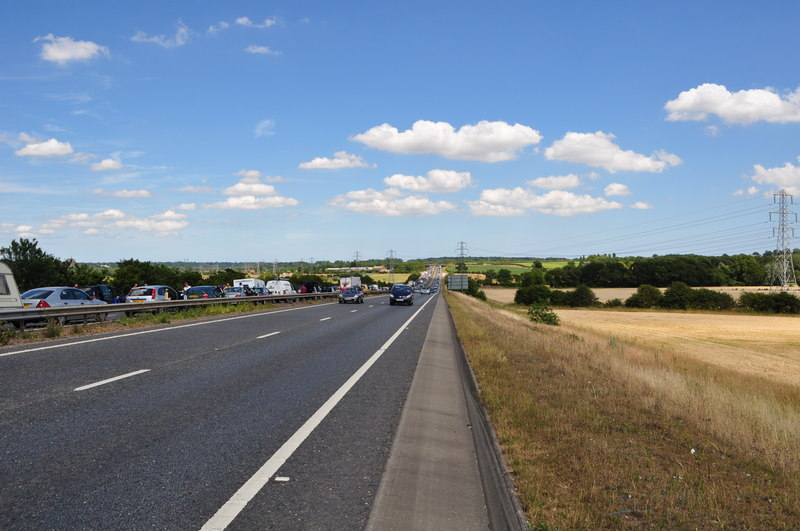
The A47 near Norwich

Nearing King's Lynn, the dual carriageway crosses over the River Great Ouse and Fen Rivers Way footpath. Construction of the King's Lynn southern bypass, built by W. & C. French at a cost of £3,733,000, began on 5 April 1972 and was completed in 1975. It meets the A148 road at a grade-separated junction known as the Saddlebow interchange. The A10 and the A149 terminate at the Hardwick Flyover (opened on 30 October 2003) near the Hardwick Industrial Estate (formerly home of Campbell's Soup). After this junction it becomes Constitution Hill until the turn off for North Runcton; then Lynn Road, where in Middleton it passes the Grade II listed former lodge to Middleton Hall, 'The Old Lodge', the former Crown public house and St Mary's church.

Next is East Winch, where it passes All Saints's church, then West Bilney where it passes St Cecilia's church. Soon after, the former Lynn and Dereham Railway line is crossed, followed by a right-turn for Pentney, and the B1153 for East Walton. The half-mile Narborough Bypass, opened in November 1992, where the road crosses the River Nar and enters the district of Breckland. There is a straight section to where it meets the A1122 (for RAF Marham) at a roundabout at the start of the five-mile part-dual-carriageway Swaffham Bypass, which opened in June 1981. There is an exit for Swaffham, and a grade-separated junction with the A1065 (for Fakenham).

It passes some wind turbines and there is a roundabout where it joins the former route just before it is crossed by the Peddars Way. There is a left turn for Sporle and it passes Necton then heads north-west through Little Fransham, passing the Canary and Linnet, with a left turn for Crane's Corner. The seven-mile £5 million part-dual-carriageway East Dereham Bypass opened in spring 1978, which was built on part of the disused railway line. It passes near Wendling and St Peter and St Paul church then meets the B1146 (for Dereham) and A1075 (for Shipdham) near a Tesco supermarket and B1135. The B1147 leaves for Swanton Morley. The three-mile £9 million East Dereham-North Tuddenham Improvement opened in August 1992, which passes North Tuddenham. It bypasses Hockering. It enters the district of Broadland at the start of the bypass of Honingham, where it crosses the River Tud. Just before the roundabout at Easton, it enters the district of South Norfolk.

==== Norwich Southern Bypass ====
The dual-carriageway £62 million Norwich Bypass opened in September 1992. At the Longwater Intersection, the A1074 follows the former route through Norwich near the Longwater Retail Park and Sainsbury's. Near Bawburgh, it crosses the River Yare. There is a GSJ with the B1108, for Little Melton and Colney. At Cringleford, it meets the A11 at the Thickthorn Interchange and Thickthorn Services and crosses the Breckland Line. Near Keswick Hall, it meets the A140 at a GSJ at Harford Bridge, south of Norwich, near a Tesco, then crosses the Great Eastern Main Line. It is crossed by Boudica's Way, then meets the A146 at a GSJ. It crosses the River Yare again at the Postwick Viaduct and enters the district of Broadland.

==== Postwick Viaduct to Great Yarmouth ====
It crosses the Wherry Line and meets the A1042 at a GSJ. The section from the end of this bypass to Blofield, the one-mile £1.2 million Postwick-Blofield Dualling, was opened in November 1987. There is a left turn to Great Plumstead. The one-mile £4 million dual-carriageway Blofield Bypass opened in February 1983, which starts at a roundabout for Brundall. It becomes single carriageway and passes North Burlingham near the staggered White House crossroads with the B1140. The three-mile £7.1 million dual-carriageway Acle Bypass opened in March 1989, which ends at a roundabout with the A1048 near a Travelodge, becoming the single carriageway New Road. From Acle, the road enters the Acle Straight which is nearly seven miles of straight and level single carriageway to Great Yarmouth, with just one curve at Road House Diner. The road is notorious for congestion, especially during the holiday season, and also for the number of accidents, which due to the drainage ditches on either side of the road are often fatal, and demands for dualling have been heard for many years, although there are no current plans to go ahead with this. It enters the district of Great Yarmouth, then passes close to Breydon Water. The northern section of the two-mile £19 million Great Yarmouth Western Bypass (A47) opened in March 1986, and the southern section opened in May 1995.

=== Great Yarmouth – Lowestoft ===
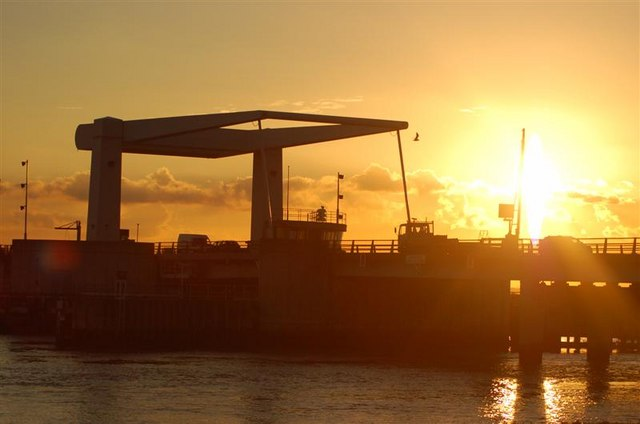
The Breydon Bridge to the west of Great Yarmouth now carries the A47.

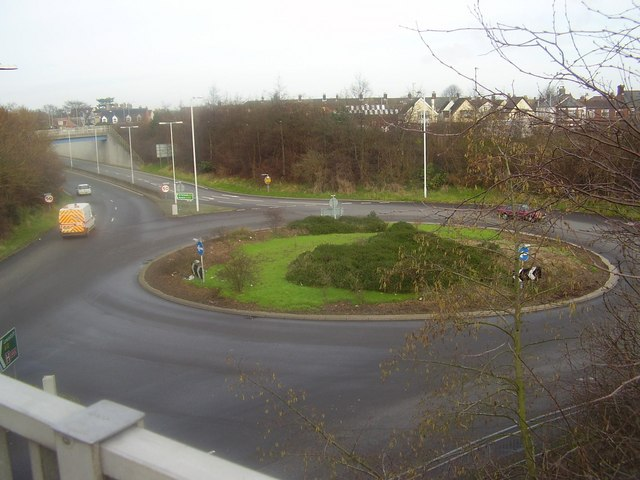
The Gorleston Relief Bypass, which used to be the A12

From the Acle Straight, the A47 meets the Vauxhall Roundabout in Great Yarmouth where it intersects with the A149. The A47 follows a route south across Breydon Bridge which spans the estuary where the Rivers Yare and Bure meet Breydon Water. It meets at the Gapton Hall Roundabout, which intersects with the A1243. The route continues South, meeting with the Harfrey's Roundabout, which connects the A47 to Great Yarmouth's Herring Bridge. From there the A47 is formed of the Gorleston Bypass, a 2.6KM stretch of dual carriageway with a single slip-road connecting it to Gorleston via the A143. After this, a small section of the A47 runs south past the regions main A&E, the James Paget University Hospital. Approx 5.5 KM of dual carriageway then takes the A47 to North Lowestoft, which connects the A47 to the coastal villages of Hopton and Corton via 3 roundabouts. The A47 enters Suffolk as its route heads south into Lowestoft, along restricted 30MPH roads. As the A47 intersects with the A1144 in the centre of Lowestoft, it branches off into two routes. The main A47 branches past the towns docks, where it enters a section of 3 lanes controlled by lane tidal flow lights, which predetermine which of the three lanes is open for north or southbound travel over the bascule bridge. The secondary A47 branches through the centre of the town, passing Lowestoft Railway Station and meeting the main A47 by the docks just before the bridge. The A47 then terminates at the Bascule Bridge, where the A12 begins.

== Bus service ==
First Eastern Counties run an 'Excel' service, with four branded routes – A, B, C and D, which primarily serve population centres along the A47, with some routes going as far as Peterborough.

== Junction list ==
=== First segment ===
County	Location	mi	km	Destinations	Notes
West Midlands	Birmingham	0.0	0.0	A4540 (Ring Road) / Jennens Road to M5 / A38(M) / M6 / A45 / A34 / A41 – Birmingham Airport, Stratford, Solihull, Walsall, Coventry, Wolverhampton, Sutton Coldfield	Western terminus
West Midlands	Birmingham	2.8– 2.9	4.5– 4.7	A4040 to M6 north / M5 – Stockland Green, Erdington, Birmingham Airport, Stechford, Ward End, Bromford	Bromford signed westbound only
West Midlands	Birmingham	4.4	7.1	A452 (Chester Road) / Tangmere Drive to M6 Toll north / M6 south / A38 – Brownhills, Sutton Coldfield, Lichfield, Minworth, Leamington Spa, Castle Bromwich, Castle Vale	Eastern terminus
1.000 mi = 1.609 km; 1.000 km = 0.621 mi

=== Second segment ===
County	Location	mi	km	Jct	Destinations	Notes
Warwickshire	Nuneaton	0.0	0.0		A444 to B4114 – Town centre, Birmingham	Western terminus
Warwickshire	Nuneaton	1.1	1.8		A4254 south-west (Eastboro Way) – Attleborough, Coventry	Attleborough signed eastbound only, Coventry westbound only; north-eastern terminus of A4254
Warwickshire	Nuneaton	2.1	3.4		A5 north-west (Watling Street) to M42 – Tamworth, Atherstone	Western terminus of A5 concurrency
Leicestershire	Hinckley	2.4	3.9		A5 south-east / B4666 (Coventry Road) to M1 / M69 – Town centre, Coventry, Leicester, Milton Keynes, Burbage, London	London signed westbound only; eastern terminus of A5 concurrency
Leicestershire	Hinckley	5.4	8.7		A447 north / B4667 (Ashby Road) – Town centre, Market Bosworth	Southern terminus of A447
Leicestershire	Leicester	15.4	24.8		A563 (New Parks Way / Braunstone Way) to M1 / M69 – Leicester (N & S), Glenfield, Thorpe Astley	
Leicestershire	Leicester	17.2	27.7		A5460 south / Tudor Road to M1 / M69	To M1 and M69 signed eastbound only; northern terminus of A5460
Leicestershire	Leicester	17.5	28.2		A594 south to A426 – Rugby	To A426 and Rugby signed eastbound only; western terminus of A594 concurrency
Leicestershire	Leicester	17.7	28.5		Northgate Street (A50 north-west)	No access from A47 west to A50 or from A50 to A47 east; south-eastern terminus of A50
Leicestershire	Leicester	17.9	28.8		A6 north (St. Margaret's Way) / Church Gate to A50 – Loughborough, Coalville	Destinations signed westbound only; western terminus of A6 concurrency
Leicestershire	Leicester	18.2	29.3		A607 north – Melton Mowbray	Grade-separated junction; southern terminus of A607
Leicestershire	Leicester	18.6	29.9		A594 south / A6 south to M1 / M69 – Market Harborough	To M1 and M69 signed westbound only; eastern terminus of A594 / A6 concurrency
Leicestershire	Leicester	20.0	32.2		A6030 (Ring Road south) to M1 / M69 / A6 – Market Harborough	
Leicestershire	Leicester	20.8	33.5		A563 north (Ring Road north) / Goodwood Road / M1 / M69 / A607 / A46 / A6 – Melton Mowbray, Newark, Loughborough, Peterborough, Market Harborough	Southern terminus of A563
Rutland	Ayston	36.7	59.1		A6003 to Ayston Road / A606 / A6116 – Oakham, Melton Mowbray, Kettering, Corby, Ayston, Rutland, Uppingham, Caldecott	
Rutland	Morcott	40.6	65.3		A6121 north-east (Stamford Road) – Stamford, South Luffenham, Morcott	South-western terminus of A6121
Northamptonshire	Duddington	45.0	72.4		A43 – Collyweston, Stamford, Corby, Kettering	
Cambridgeshire	Wansford	50.5– 50.7	81.3– 81.6		A1 to A1139 – The North, London, Stamford, Peterborough (S)	Junction on A1
Cambridgeshire	Sutton			Begin freeway		
Cambridgeshire	Castor	54.9	88.4		Castor	Westbound exit and eastbound entrance
Cambridgeshire	Bretton– Peterborough boundary	55.7– 56.2	89.6– 90.4	15	A1260 south to A1 / A605 – Peterborough, London, Northampton	Peterborough signed eastbound only, To A1, A605, London and Northampton westbound only; northern terminus of A1260
Cambridgeshire	Bretton– Peterborough boundary	57.1– 57.5	91.9– 92.5	16	Bretton centre	
Cambridgeshire	Bretton– Peterborough boundary	57.9– 58.6	93.2– 94.3	17; 18	City centre, Marholm	Signed as exit 17 eastbound, 18 westbound
Cambridgeshire	Peterborough	59.0– 59.4	95.0– 95.6	19	Local traffic	
Cambridgeshire	Peterborough	59.9	96.4	End freeway		
Cambridgeshire	Peterborough	59.9	96.4		A15 to A1 / A605 – Sleaford, Gunthorpe, Werrington, London, Northampton, Eye, City centre	Gunthorpe and W'ton signed eastbound only, To A1, A605, London, N'hampton, Eye and City signed westbound only
Cambridgeshire	Eye– Peterborough boundary	60.2	96.9		A16 north / Welland Road – Spalding, Crowland, Newborough	Newborough signed westbound only; southern terminus of A16
Cambridgeshire	Eye	61.1	98.3		A1139 south / White Post Road South – Eye	Northern terminus of A1139
Cambridgeshire	Ring's End	72.8	117.2		A141 south (March Road) – March	Northern terminus of A141
Norfolk	Emneth	78.5	126.3		A1101 (Elm High Road) – Wisbech, Sleaford, Downham Market, Ely, Elm, Emneth, Outwell	Elm, Emneth and Outwell signed eastbound only, Ely westbound only
Norfolk	Terrington St John	84.8– 85.2	136.5– 137.1		Terrington St John, Tilney St Lawrence	Junction; Tilney signed eastbound only
Norfolk	Tilney All Saints –West Lynn boundary	90.2	145.2		A17 / Clenchwarton Road – Sleaford, West Lynn	Eastern terminus of A17
Norfolk	King's Lynn	90.9– 91.2	146.3– 146.8		St Germans, Saddlebow (A148 east)	Junction; information signed eastbound only; western terminus of A148
Norfolk	King's Lynn– North Runcton boundary	91.9– 92.1	147.9– 148.2		A149 / A10 south to A148 / A134 – Downham Market, Cromer, Hunstanton, King's Lynn, Thetford	To A148, A134, Hunstanton and Thetford signed eastbound only; northern terminus of A10
Norfolk	Swaffham	103.6	166.7		A1122 west (Swaffham Road) – Downham Market	Eastern terminus of A1122
Norfolk	Swaffham	104.7	168.5		Swaffham	Junction; eastbound exit and westbound entrance
Norfolk	Swaffham	105.9– 106.1	170.4– 170.8		A1065 – Cromer, Newmarket, Swaffham	
Norfolk	Dereham	117.5– 118.0	189.1– 189.9		A1075 south to B1135 – Dereham, Watton, Wymondham	Junction; To B1135 and Wymondham signed eastbound only; northern terminus of A1075
Norfolk	Dereham	118.6– 119.0	190.9– 191.5		B1110 – Swanton Morley	Junction; B1110 signed westbound only
Norfolk	North Tuddenham	121.3– 121.6	195.2– 195.7		North Tuddenham	Junction
Norfolk	Easton	126.7	203.9	Begin freeway		
Norfolk	Costessey	128.2– 128.4	206.3– 206.6		A1074 east to A140 – Norwich, Cromer, Costessey	To A140 and Cromer signed eastbound only; western terminus of A1074
Norfolk	Bawburgh– Colney– Little Melton boundary	130.0– 130.3	209.2– 209.7		B1108 – Norwich, Watton, Colney	
Norfolk	Cringleford– Hethersett–Ketteringham boundary	131.9– 132.4	212.3– 213.1		A11 – Norwich, Thetford, London	
Norfolk	Caistor St Edmund	134.5– 134.9	216.5– 217.1		A140 to A1066 – Norwich, Ipswich, Diss	
Norfolk	Trowse	137.0– 137.4	220.5– 221.1		A146 – Norwich, Lowestoft, Trowse	
Norfolk	Postwick with Witton	139.8– 140.5	225.0– 226.1		A1042 west to A140 – Norwich (N & E), Postwick, Thorpe St Andrew, Cromer	Thorpe signed eastbound only, Cromer westbound only; eastern terminus of A1042
Norfolk	Postwick with Witton	140.5	226.1	End freeway		
Norfolk	Blofield	142.7– 143.2	229.7– 230.5		Blofield Heath	Junction; eastbound exit and entrance
Norfolk	Acle	146.6	235.9		Acle, Reedham, Upton	Junction; eastbound exit and westbound entrance
Norfolk	Acle	147.5	237.4		A1064 east / New Road – Caister, Acle, Reedham, Upton	Reedham and Upton signed westbound only; western terminus of A1064
Norfolk	Great Yarmouth	154.8	249.1		A149 west (Acle New Road) – Town centre, Caister	Eastern terminus of A149
Norfolk	Great Yarmouth	156.1	251.2		Pasteur Road (A1243 east) / Gapton Hall Road	Western terminus of A1243
Norfolk	Great Yarmouth	156.6	252.0		William Adams Way (A1154 east) – Gorleston	Western terminus of A1154
Norfolk	Gorleston-on-Sea	157.1	252.8		A143 to A146 – Diss, Beccles	Junction; eastbound exit and westbound entrance
Suffolk	Corton	162.7	261.8		A12 south-west (Millenium Way) / B1385 (Corton Long Lane) / Blundeston Road – Ipswich, Beccles, Corton, Blundeston	North-eastern terminus of A12
Suffolk	Lowestoft	165.1	265.7		A1144 west (St Peter's Street) / Dukes Head Street to B1074 – Beccles, Somerleyton, Oulton Broad	Routes signed westbound only; eastern terminus of A1144
Suffolk	Lowestoft	166.4	267.8		A12 to A146 / B1531 – Ipswich, Beccles, Oulton Broad	Eastern terminus
1.000 mi = 1.609 km; 1.000 km = 0.621 mi
