= River Tud =

River in Norfolk, England

Tud
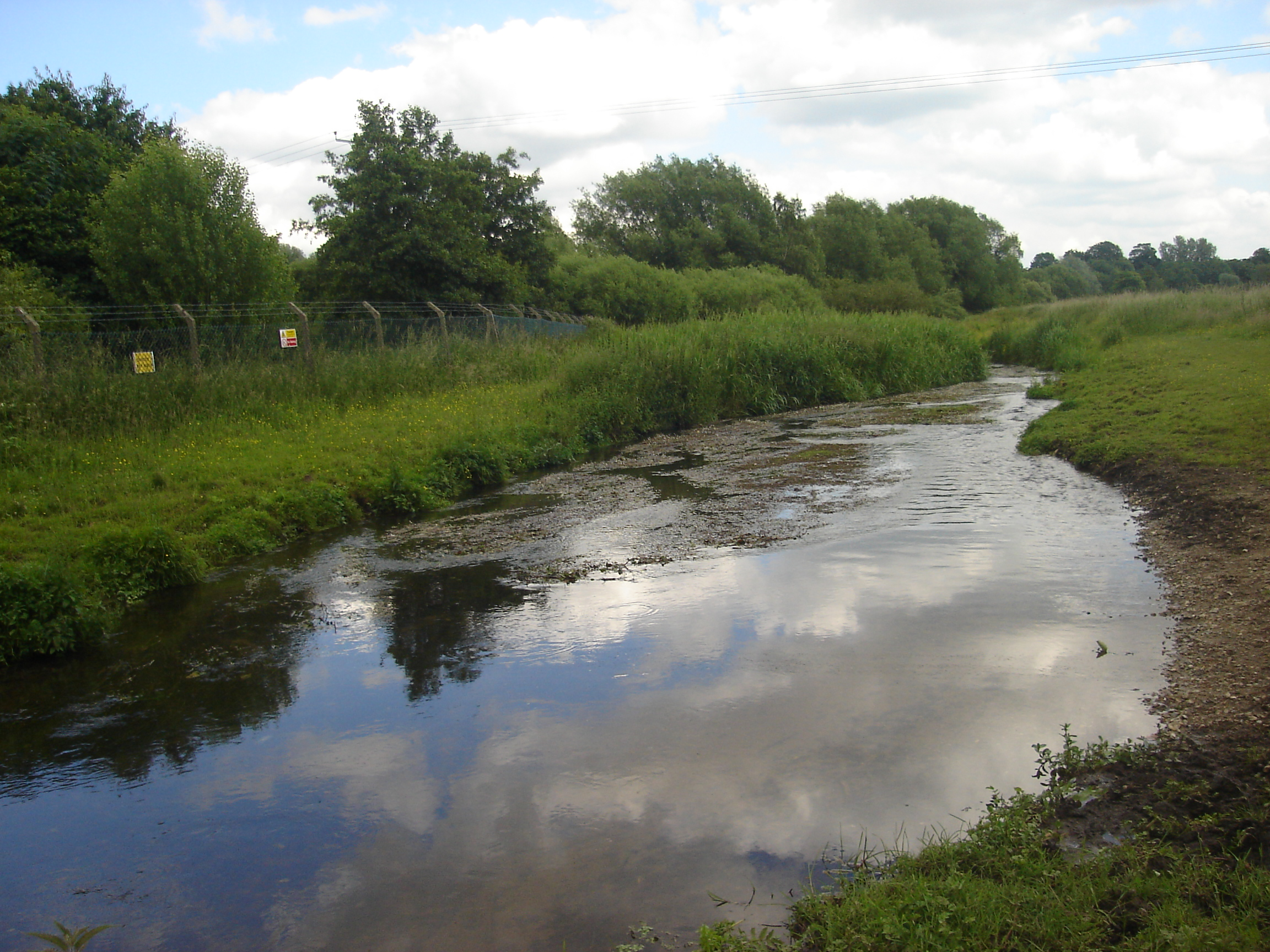
- The river viewed from Marriott's Way, Hellesdon. The Anglian Water fish farm is on the far bank

- Location of the river mouth within Norfolk

Location
- Country: England
- Region: Norfolk

Physical characteristics
- Source
  - location: north of Shipdham
  - coordinates: 52.6430°N 0.9097°E
  - elevation: 76 m (249 ft)
- Mouth: River Wensum
  - location: Hellesdon
  - coordinates: 52.6464°N 1.2486°E
  - elevation: 4 m (13 ft)
- Length: 27.0 km (16.8 mi)

Basin features
- River system: River Wensum

River Tud is a tributary of the River Wensum, Norfolk in the East of England. The Tud's source is just south of Dereham and it flows in an easterly direction for 27 kilometres (17 mi) to its confluence with the Wensum below Hellesdon mill. According to a 2024 citizen science project, the Tud should be classified as a chalk stream.

== Course ==
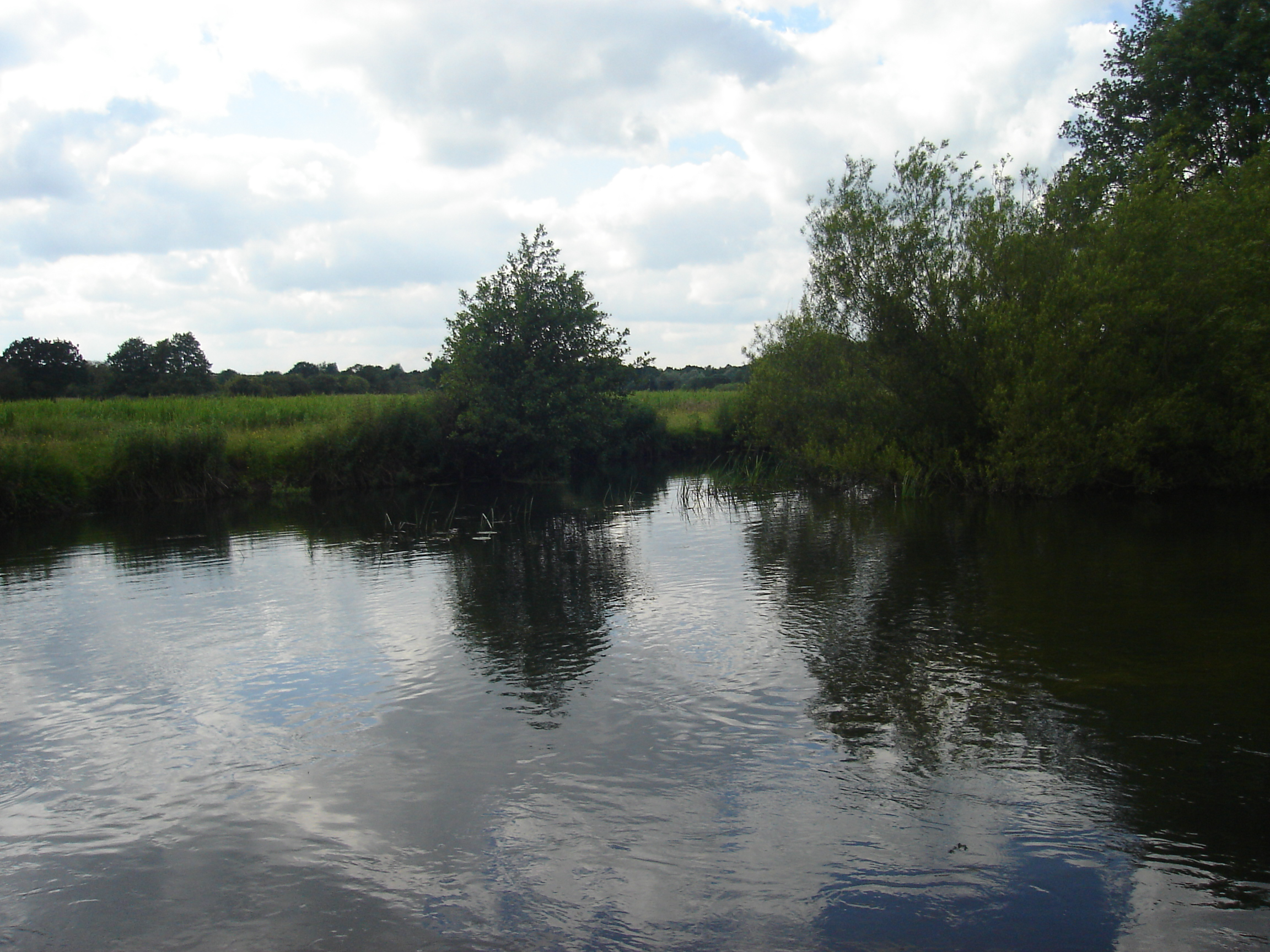
The Tud in the background merges with the Wensum below Hellesdon Mill

The Tud passes through the villages of North Tuddenham, Hockering, East Tuddenham, Honingham, Easton, Costessey and finally flows under the Marriott's Way before joining the Wensum at Hellesdon Mill.

== Ecology ==
The Tud's water is crystal clear, shallow, fast-flowing and has lush weed beds full of aquatic life including crayfish, lampreys, bullheads, freshwater shrimps and stone loach.

== Angling ==
The river is well known for the quality dace fishing. Trout can also be caught particularly in the upper reaches. Angling is mostly private. The river has suffered from the odd case of pollution.
