= A6030 road =

Road in England

A6030

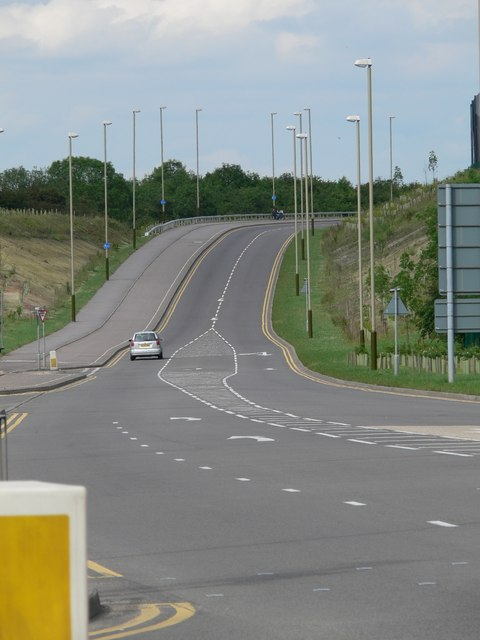
- The new northern section of the A6030

Route information
- Length: 3.8 mi (6.1 km)

Major junctions
- north end: Hamilton; 52.6575°N 1.0802°W
- A563; A47; A6
- south end: Stoneygate; 52.6142°N 1.1041°W

Location
- Country: United Kingdom

Road network
- Roads in the United Kingdom; Motorways; A and B road zones

The A6030 is a small ring-road entirely within the built-up central area of Leicester, from its roundabout with the A563 near Hamilton, south to cross the A47 at Evington, past Leicester General Hospital and the Leicestershire Golf Club to meet the A6 again at Stoneygate near Oadby.

The road is a useful part of the route from the M1 at its junction with the M69 (M1/J21) to the A47 heading towards Peterborough and beyond, effectively "plugging the gap" in the A563 ring-road between the A6 at Oadby and the A47 at Highfields.

== History ==
The section of road between Gipsy Lane and the A563 was opened in April 2005 to make it easier for traffic to get to Oadby and the A6, otherwise they would have had to use the unfinished A563 to get to Oadby. The small section of road between Red Hill Circle and the A607 still has the 'A6030' road name but the rest of the old road has been downgraded. The stretch between Red Hill Circle and Gypsy Lane was originally the A6 (Loughborough Road).

The A6030 was meant to be the eastern half of the A563 at one stage. At its junction with Hastings Road, where the A6030 effectively turns off to the north, there is a strip of land as far as the railway line (which has now had a housing estate with cul-de-sacs built on it, you can still see where the road would have gone). The A6030 would then have obliterated Canon Street and Ratcliffe Street, continued West over the River Soar, lining up with Corporation Road and then Beaumont Leys Lane. This would then have curved, approximating the later line of Strasbourg Drive, to line up with the western half of the A563.
