= William d'Ecouis =

Anglo-Norman nobleman

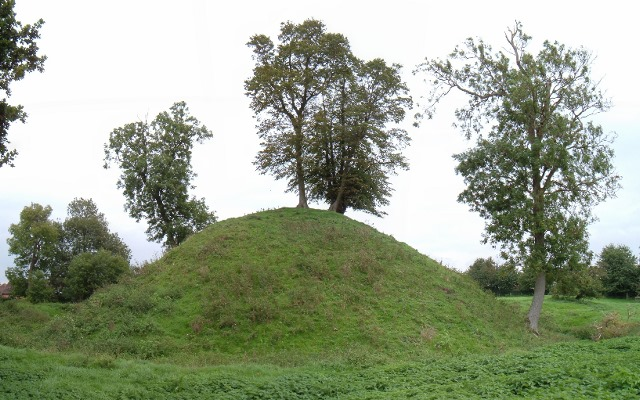
Middleton mount, the remains of William d'Ecouis’s motte-and-bailey castle at Middleton in Norfolk

William d'Ecouis (sometimes referred to as William de Schoies) was an early Anglo-Norman baron, who is mentioned in the Domesday Book of 1086 as a substantial holder of land and manors.

William d'Ecouis founded Middleton castle, a motte-and-bailey fortress thought to be constructed from timber, the remains of which is a scheduled monument listed as Middleton Mound. The motte, surrounded by a ditch, is at the west side of Station Road in Middleton, Norfolk, a village 3 miles (5 km) south-east from King's Lynn, on the A47 road.
