= Terrington St John =

Village in Norfolk, England

Coordinates: 52.70226°N 0.27352°E

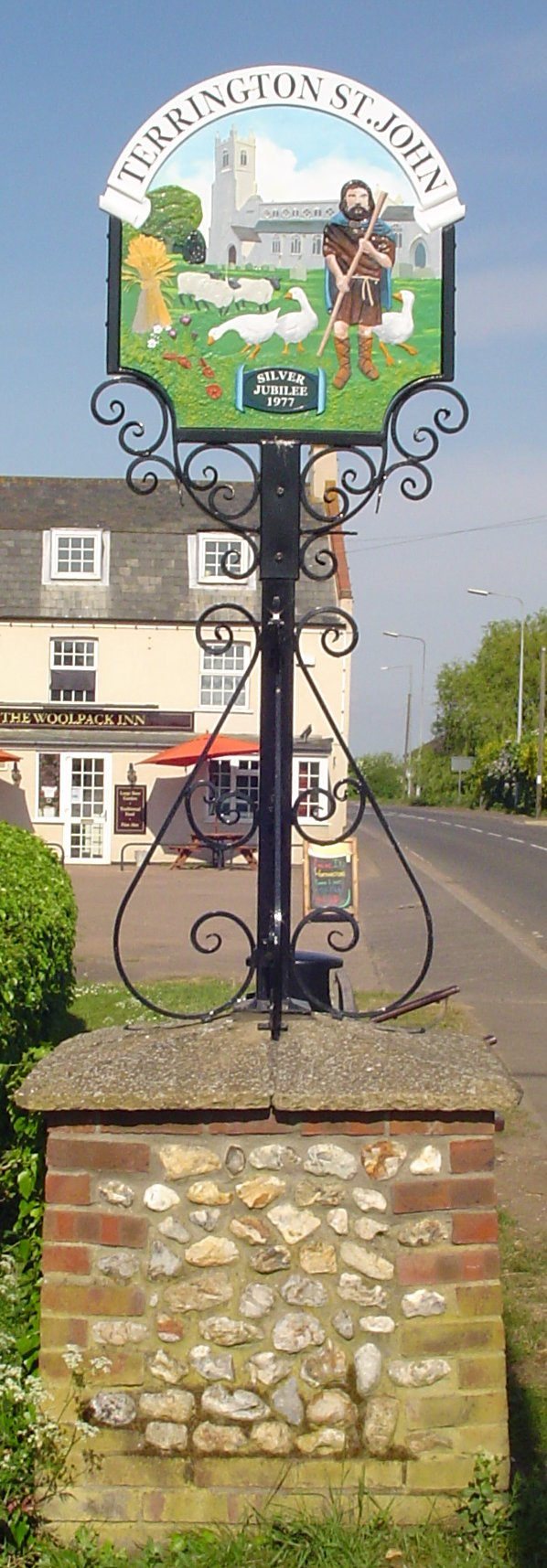
- Village sign in Terrington St. John

- Location within Norfolk
- Area: 8.26 km^{2} (3.19 sq mi)
- Population: 891 (2011)
  - Density: 108/km^{2} (280/sq mi)
- OS grid reference: TF537140
- Civil parish: Terrington St John
- District: King's Lynn and West Norfolk
- Shire county: Norfolk
- Region: East
- Country: England
- Sovereign state: United Kingdom
- Post town: WISBECH
- Postcode district: PE14
- Dialling code: 01945
- Police: Norfolk
- Fire: Norfolk
- Ambulance: East of England
- UK Parliament: North West Norfolk

Terrington St John is a village and civil parish in the English county of Norfolk. The village lies to the south of the route of the A47 between Peterborough and Kings Lynn.

It covers an area of 8.26 km^{2} (3.19 sq mi) and had a population of 882 in 336 households at the 2001 census, the population slightly increasing to 891 at the 2011 Census. For the purposes of local government, it falls within the district of King's Lynn and West Norfolk.

The Church of St John is a Grade I listed building.

== History ==
The villages name means 'Farm/settlement of Tir(a)'s people' or perhaps, 'farm/settlement connected with Tir(a)'. 'St. John' from the church dedication.

According to Gardiner, "The church of St. John dates from 1423[... and] a curious stone in the church-yard has been pointed out as 'Hickathrift's Candles'".

== See also ==
- Terrington St Clement
- Terrington railway station

== Notes ==
http://kepn.nottingham.ac.uk/map/place/Norfolk/Terrington%20St.%20John
