= Postwick with Witton =

Civil parish in Norfolk, England

Coordinates: 52.625°N 1.4°E

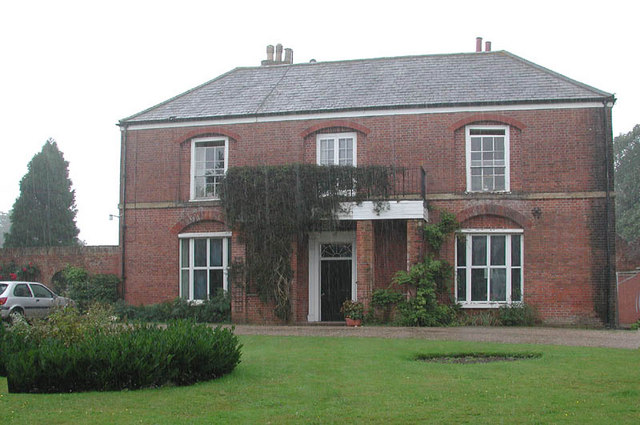
- Witton Hall

- Location within Norfolk
- Area: 8.29 km^{2} (3.20 sq mi)
- Population: 404 (2011)
  - Density: 49/km^{2} (130/sq mi)
- OS grid reference: TG3008
- Civil parish: Postwick with Witton
- District: Broadland
- Shire county: Norfolk
- Region: East
- Country: England
- Sovereign state: United Kingdom
- Post town: NORWICH
- Postcode district: NR13
- Dialling code: 01603
- Police: Norfolk
- Fire: Norfolk
- Ambulance: East of England
- UK Parliament: Broadland and Fakenham

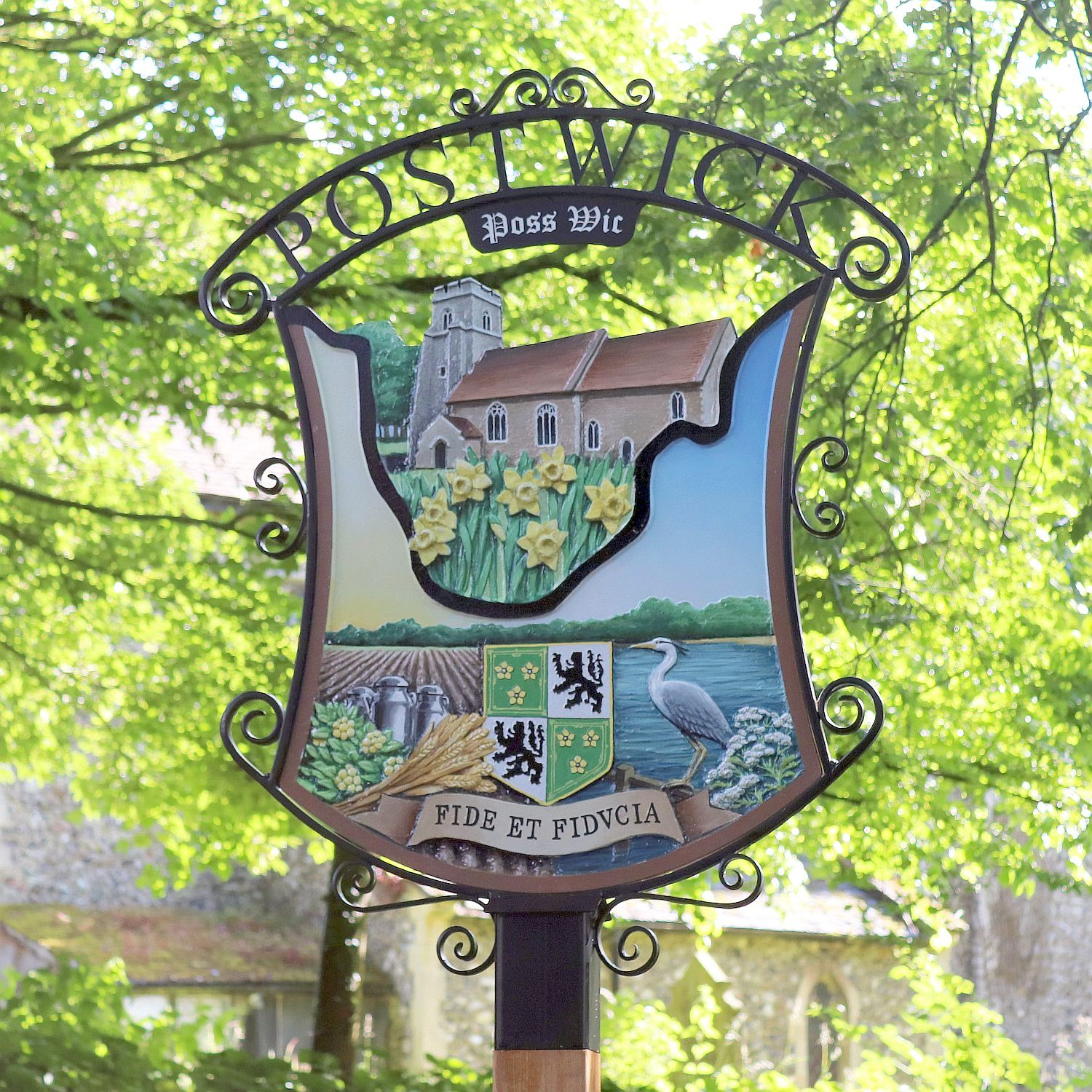
Postwick village sign

Postwick with Witton (/ˌpɒzik/) is a civil parish on the Broads in the English county of Norfolk, comprising the two adjacent villages of Postwick and Witton. Postwick is some 4.5 miles (7.2 km) east of the city of Norwich, just south of the eastern end of the A47 Norwich southern bypass on the north bank of the River Yare. Witton lies 1.75 miles (2.8 km) to the north-east, north of the A47.

The civil parish has an area of 8.29 km^{2} (3.20 sq mi) and in the 2001 census had a population of 323 in 128 households, increasing to a population of 404 in 162 households at the 2011 Census. For the purposes of local government, the parish falls within the district of Broadland.

== Transport ==
Although the Wherry Lines rail line passes through Postwick, there is no station in the parish. In the west of the parish at the junction of the A47 and A1042 is Postwick Park and Ride, one of six such sites surrounding Norwich. A ferry once operated on the River Yare between Postwick and Surlingham. It ceased c. 1939 after a collision with a coaster

== Toponymy ==
The name "Postwick" means "Poss(a)'s specialised farm".

"Witton" means "Wood farm/settlement".
