= Middleton Mount =

- Norfolk, England
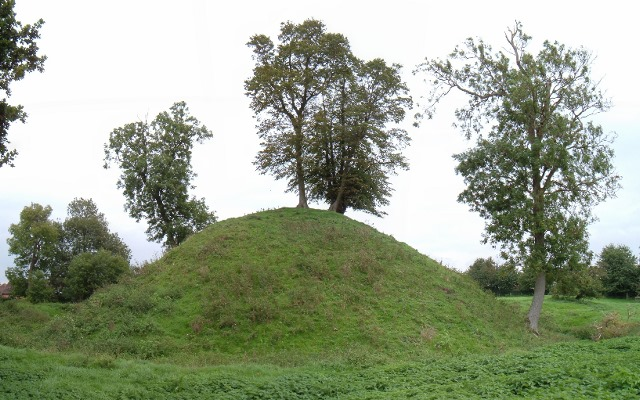
- Middleton Mount

Site information
- Type: Motte and bailey
- Owner: Norfolk Archaeological Trust
- Condition: Earthworks only survive

Location
- Shown within Norfolk
- Coordinates: 52.7198°N 0.4563°E
- Grid reference: grid reference TF660164

Middleton Mount, also called Middleton Motte and Middleton Castle, is the remains of a medieval castle situated in the village of Middleton, in Norfolk, England.

== Details ==
Middleton Mount was a motte and bailey castle built during the Norman period. The motte is 49 m in diameter, protected by an 11 m wide ditch. The castle's crescent-shaped bailey and three rectangular enclosures of uncertain medieval date lay alongside the motte. The castle was built by the Normans on a pre-existing Anglo-Saxon estate centre, a common practice after the Norman conquest of England.

The site was excavated in 1987 before the development of much of the surrounding land, including the enclosures, for local housing. The castle was bought by the Norfolk Archaeological Trust in 2006 and is a scheduled monument. The Trust also works to make sure the castle is open for public access.

== See also ==
- Castles in Great Britain and Ireland
- List of castles in England

== Bibliography ==
- Creighton, Oliver Hamilton. (2005) Castles and Landscapes: Power, Community and Fortification in Medieval England. London: Equinox. ISBN 978-1-904768-67-8.
- Pettifer, Adrian. (2002) English Castles: a Guide by Counties. Woodbridge, UK: Boydell Press. ISBN 978-0-85115-782-5.
