= Middleton, Norfolk =

Village in Norfolk, England

Coordinates: 52.717°N 0.467°E

Middleton
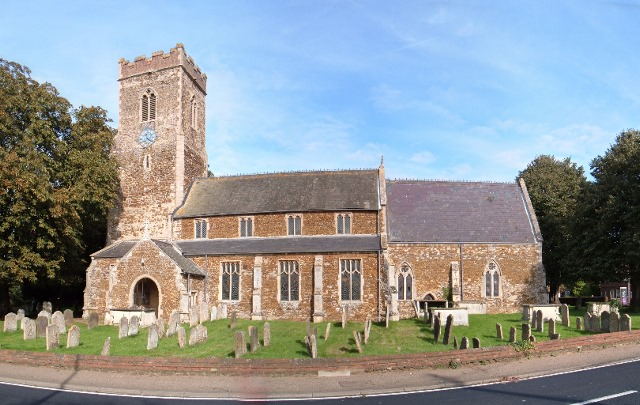
- Saint Mary's Church, Middleton

- Location within Norfolk
- Area: 13.01 km^{2} (5.02 sq mi)
- Population: 1,450 (2011)
  - Density: 111/km^{2} (290/sq mi)
- OS grid reference: TF663160
- Civil parish: Middleton
- District: King's Lynn and West Norfolk
- Shire county: Norfolk
- Region: East
- Country: England
- Sovereign state: United Kingdom
- Post town: KING'S LYNN
- Postcode district: PE32
- Police: Norfolk
- Fire: Norfolk
- Ambulance: East of England

Middleton is a village and civil parish in the English county of Norfolk. It covers an area of 5.02 sq mi (13.0 km^{2}) and had a population of 1,516 in 621 households at the 2001 census, reducing to 1,450 at the 2011 Census.

The village's name means 'Middle farm/settlement'.

Middleton is the second village on the A47 road to Norwich, after North Runcton, and lies approximately 3 miles (5 km) east of King's Lynn. The A47, the main road of Norfolk, effectively divides the village in two, and has long been a site of road traffic accidents. Fair Green and Blackborough End are also areas of Middleton. Fair Green is on the northern part of the village, whilst Blackborough End is in the southern half of the village.

Middleton has a primary school, Middleton V.C. Primary School, a village hall, and a post office. The village church is called Saint Mary's. The church is situated beside the A47. The village also has a golf club.

== Governance ==
An electoral ward in the same name exists. The population of this ward at the 2011 census was 2,298.

== Middleton Castle ==
Middleton Castle was founded by William d'Ecouis. It was a motte and bailey fortress which was thought to be constructed from timber. The large motte is surrounded by a wide ditch.

== Historic public houses ==
There are currently two pubs in Middleton, the Crown, now called Middletons and the Gate Inn. The Crown has spent many years opening and closing with new tenants. The earliest recorded landlord was William Newman, who lived there in 1836, although the pub is known to have been there before this, as it is shown in historical maps. The Gate Inn, which may have been opened in c. 1845, is situated on Hill Road in Fair Green. Its first owner is recorded as Ann Bardell.

Previously, there have been a few other pubs in Middleton. These included the Castle Inn, which was opened by Bedingfield Bardell in c. 1845, later on sold to Thomas Edward Bagge of Gaywood Hall, and closed in 1969. The Wheatsheaf, which was only open from 1858 to 1879 had two owners, George Smith and Robert Rye. Finally the Royale Oak, which was situated on East Winch Road in Blackborough End. The first landlord was Robert Berry, who opened the pub in 1851. The pub closed in 1963.

== Primary school ==
Middleton's children are served by the Middleton Church of England Voluntary Aided Primary School. In June 2008 it was announced that the school was to be provided with a new hall and that the temporary classrooms would be replaced in 2010–11.

== Governance ==
Middleton is a parish of the Kings Lynn and West Norfolk district council, which is responsible for the most local services. Norfolk County Council is responsible for roads, some schools and social services. For Westminster elections the parish forms part of the North West Norfolk constituency, represented by James Wild (Conservative).

== Railway ==
From 1846 to 1968 village was served by Middleton Towers railway station on the King's Lynn to Dereham secondary line. Although the passenger route has been closed the station remains as a sand loading depot and has been the destination of a number of charter trains.

== Middleton bomb ==
On Monday 26 April 2010, bomb disposal experts were called to the village after a dog walker discovered an unexploded grenade in a field behind the primary school on School Road. Police were called at 7.00 am and are also investigating as to how the device, believed to date back to the Second World War, ended up in the field in the first place. The Ammunition Technician, from the bomb disposal team, said: “We were called to attend the scene following a call from police that an unexploded hand grenade had been discovered. The number 36 Mills grenade was then destroyed by demolition. We suspect someone has disposed of it in the field which is highly irresponsible and we would urge this person to contact the police in future.” Middleton Primary School was closed as a result of the find.

== Middleton air crash ==
On 23 November 1944 a Mosquito aircraft which had taken off from nearby Little Snoring airfield crashed into Middleton Fen.

Eyewitnesses saw the plane spiralling out of a cloud. It then righted itself before spinning into the ground. Both the pilot and navigator were killed.

Mosquito DD736 was piloted by Flying Officer Charles Preece from Hardisty, Alberta, Canada. He was one of two brothers and the son of a railway engineer on the Canadian Pacific Railway.

He is buried at St Thomas a Beckett Church, Clapham, Bedfordshire.

The navigator was a wartime hero – Flying Officer Frederick Ruffle DFC of 515 squadron. Before the crash Fred had flown over 61 sorties on intruder operations. Most of them with the elite 8 Group pathfinder squadron. He was awarded the Distinguished Flying Cross for the part he played in a succession of bombing raids on the Dortmund–Ems Canal in Germany.

Fred left a wife and a ten-month-old daughter. He is buried in the churchyard of Holy Trinity Church, High Hurstwood just off the A26 between Crowborough and Uckfield in Sussex.

The aircraft had taken off so the pilot could train on a system known as Serrate. This was a device which enabled the Mosquito crew to home in on a German night fighter's airborne radar transmissions.

In the late 1970s the aircraft was excavated from Middleton Fen by the R.A.F. and aircraft enthusiasts. Parts of the aircraft were taken to the Tower Museum at Bassingbourn in Cambridgeshire.

== Notes ==
http://kepn.nottingham.ac.uk/map/place/Norfolk/Middleton

=== Bibliography ===
- Oppitz, Leslie (1989). East Anglia Railways Remembered. Countryside Books. ISBN 978-1-85306-040-3.
