= Joseph George Cumming =

Joseph Cumming
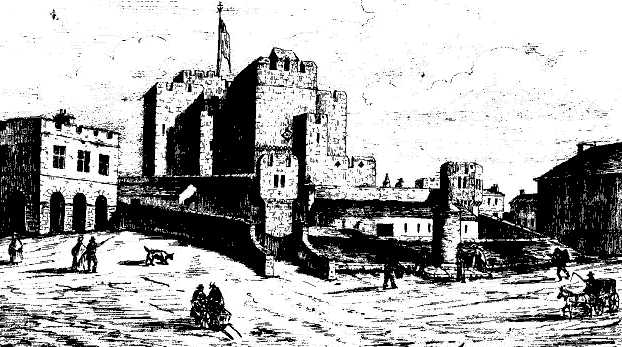
- Rushen Castle was a subject of Cumming's study
- Born: 15 February 1812; Matlock, Derbyshire
- Died: 21 December 1868 (aged 56); London
- Education: Oakham Grammar School and Emmanuel College, Cambridge
- Occupations: geologist and clergyman
- Spouse: Agnes Peckham
- Children: six
- Parent(s): Joseph Notzel Cumming and his wife Mary Gosling née Barnes

Joseph George Cumming (15 February 1812 – 21 September 1868) was an English geologist and archaeologist. His major works concerned the geology and history of the Isle of Man.

== Biography ==
Born at Matlock in Derbyshire where his mother and father ran the Old Bath Hotel at Matlock Bath. Cumming was educated at Oakham School, and Emmanuel College, Cambridge, taking the degree of MA, and entering holy orders in 1835. Joseph's elder cousin, James was Professor of Chemistry in Cambridge from 1815.

== Isle of Man ==
In 1841 he was appointed vice-principal of King William's College, Castletown, in the Isle of Man, and this position he held until 1856. During this period his leisure time was devoted to a study of the geology and archaeology of the island. The results were published in:

The Isle of Man : its History, Physical, Ecclesiastical, Civil, and Legendary. published in 1848.

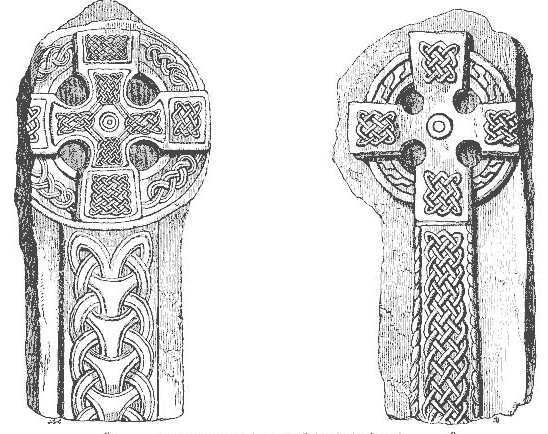
'Runic (Scandinavian) crosses "recently discovered" by the Rev. Cumming FGS

In this book he dealt with the mythical tales, recording the history of the island, especially the geological phenomena. He included the lithological character of the island and the disturbances which have produced the subsidence of some geological formations. Within the book he showed the images of manx crosses and afterwards he arranged for casts of these runic crosses to be distributed to museums and organisations in England and Ireland.

In 1856 he became master of King Edward's Grammar School at Lichfield in Staffordshire. In 1858, Cumming became warden and professor of classical literature and geology in Queen's College, Birmingham (which later became Birmingham University), in 1862 rector of Mellis, in Suffolk, and in 1867 vicar of St Johns, Bethnal Green, London.

1857 saw the publication of his book on Rushen Castle again about the Isle of Man. His interest did not wane and in 1861 he was instrumental in forming a committee to send examples of Manx culture and industrial products to the Great Exhibition of 1861.

== Family ==
Cumming married Agnes Peckham in 1838. He was survived by his four sons and two daughters. He became a Fellow of the Geological Society of London in 1846, and he published papers in the journal of that society. He died quite suddenly on 21 September 1868.

== Major works ==
- Account of the Geology of the Isle of Man. Published in the Proceedings of the Geological Society of London. August 1846.
- Geology of the Calf of Man, Quarterly Journal of the Proceedings of the Geological Society of London, 1847.
- The Isle of Man. Its History, Physical, Ecclesiastical, Civil, and Legendary (see above).
- Great Industrial Exhibition of 1861, letters showing some of the productions of the Isle of Man in connection with the Exhibition. Douglas: Printed for the Local Committee, by P. Curphey.
- The Story of Rushen Castle and Rushen Abbey, in the Isle of Man, London: Bell and Daldy, Fleet Street. 1857. Octavo.
- The Runic and Other Monumental Remains of the Isle of Man, London: Bell and Daldy, Fleet Street; 1867
- The Isle of Man. A Guide to the Isle of Man inc. Botany; Geology and Zoology. London: Edward Stanford, 1861.
- The Great Stanley, or James VII, Earl of Derby, and his Noble Countess, Charlotte de la Tremouille, in their Land of Man, London: William Mackintost, 1867.
- Antiquitates Manniae: or a Collection of Memoirs on the Antiquities of the Isle of Man, for the Manx Society by the Rev. J. G. Cumming, AI.A., F.G.S. London: 1868.
