= North Tuddenham =

Civil parish in Norfolk, England

Coordinates: 52.6863°N 1.0148°E

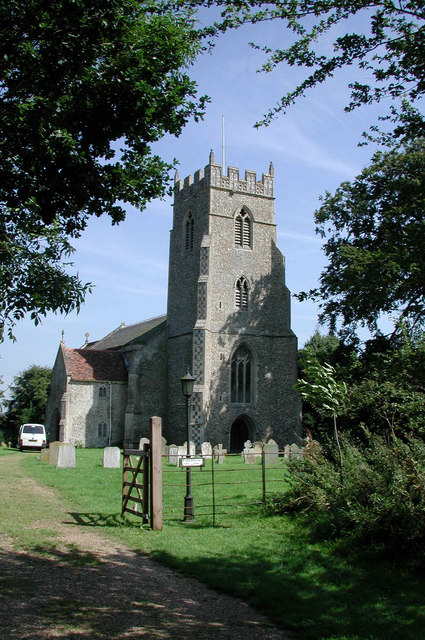
- St Mary the Virgin church, North Tuddenham

- Location within Norfolk
- Area: 9.41 km^{2} (3.63 sq mi)
- Population: 335 (2011)
  - Density: 36/km^{2} (93/sq mi)
- OS grid reference: TG038141
- Civil parish: North Tuddenham
- District: Breckland
- Shire county: Norfolk
- Region: East
- Country: England
- Sovereign state: United Kingdom
- Post town: DEREHAM
- Postcode district: NR20
- Dialling code: 01362
- Police: Norfolk
- Fire: Norfolk
- Ambulance: East of England

North Tuddenham is a civil parish in the English county of Norfolk, North Tuddenham is 3 miles (4.8 km) east of East Dereham, and is close to the A47 road.

== St. Mary's Church ==
The parish church is dedicated to St Mary.

== Etymology ==
The villages name means 'Tuda's homestead/village'.

== Geography ==
It covers an area of 9.41 km^{2} (3.63 sq mi) and had a population of 305 in 121 households at the 2001 census, increasing to a population of 335 in 138 households at the 2011 Census. For the purposes of local government, it falls within the Upper Wensum Ward of Breckland District Council and the Elmham and Mattishall Division of Norfolk County Council.

RAF Tuddenham is nearby. In 1944, a USAAF B24 bomber, assembling for what would become an aborted mission due to weather conditions, lost a wing and crashed at North Tuddenham, killing eight of the ten crew members. A memorial plaque is located in St Mary's church. The incident is also commemorated in a village flag, designed by a local school student, Esme Okan, in 2021.

North Tuddenham Common is about 23 acres in size, and has been maintained for many years as a wild habitat by the Conservation Volunteers, North Tuddenham Parish Council and Norfolk County Council. These bodies are represented on the recently formed ‘Common Management Committee’. Butterflies are an important feature of the Common, 24 species have been recorded, including less common varieties. There is also a large and varied moth population The pond, which is solely fed by rainwater, hosts a diverse ecosystem, including 17 species of dragonfly and the gold crested newt.

A plaque on the Common marks the site of the North Tuddenham Cycle Speedway track, which operated from 1947 to 1953. Shortly after WW2, local teenagers took it upon themselves to dig up the turf from the common to create a track, complete with banks. They also made their own bikes. The inspiration to start the team came from watching the Norwich Stars speedway team. Tuddenham Rangers Cycle Speedway team triumphed in the Beetley and District League, which they won four years running. They were East Anglian Champions in 1951 and 1952 and runners up in the British Championship final in 1952.
