= Acle Straight =

Road in England

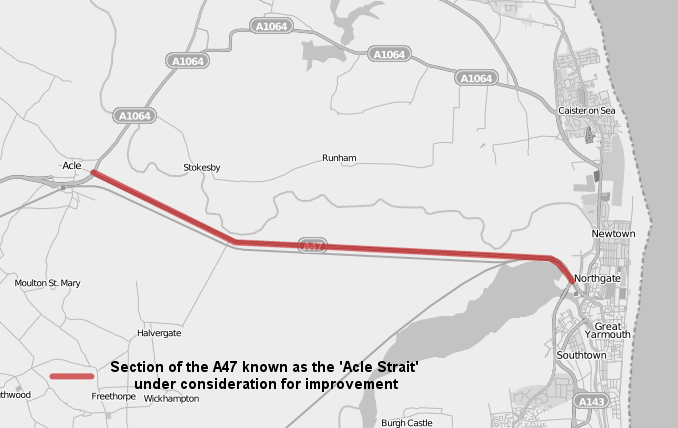
Map of the Acle Straight, Norfolk showing how it links Acle (left) to Great Yarmouth (right)

The Acle Straight, also known as the Acle New Road, is a major road between Acle and Great Yarmouth in Norfolk, England. It is part of the A47 trunk road.

== History ==
Great Yarmouth and Acle Turnpike Road Act 1830
- Act of Parliament
- Parliament of the United Kingdom
- Long title: An Act for making a Turnpike Road from the Bridge over the River Bure at Great Yarmouth to Acle (with certain Branches therefrom), all in the County of Norfolk.
- Citation: 11 Geo. 4 & 1 Will. 4. c. xxxix
- Territorial extent: United Kingdom

Dates
- Royal assent: 3 May 1830
- Commencement: 3 May 1830 (Note: The Acts of Parliament (Commencement) Act 1793.)
- Repealed: 21 July 2008
Other legislation
Repealed by	Statute Law (Repeals) Act 2008

Status: Repealed

Text of statute as originally enacted

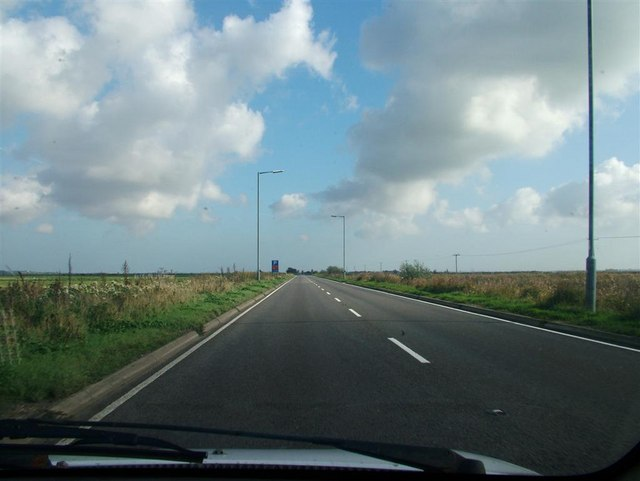
The Acle Straight, heading towards Great Yarmouth

The road was originally proposed as a turnpike on 3 May 1830 following an act of Parliament, the Great Yarmouth and Acle Turnpike Road Act 1830 (11 Geo. 4 & 1 Will. 4. c. xxxix) and engineered by William Thorold. Its purpose was to provide quicker access between the two towns over the Halvergate Marshes. It was designed as two straight sections, connected by a bend halfway along which included a branch road between Seven Mile House and Halvergate. This reduced the distance from Great Yarmouth to Norwich by 3 miles 5 furlongs (5.83 km). The road was constructed by digging two parallel ditches, 37 feet (11 m) feet apart, with a surface comprising brushwood, gravel and soil from the ditches. It was largely complete by April 1831 and opened later that year.

Tolls were removed from the road in 1861, though they remained on the Yarmouth Suspension Bridge over the River Bure into the town centre until 1920.

In 1882, the railway line between Acle and Great Yarmouth was built parallel to the Acle Straight. The Stracey Arms Windpump was built in 1883 near the Halvergate branch road junction. It was Grade II* listed in 1982. A similarly named pub, the Stracey Arms, opened next door to the windmill. It subsequently became popular with boaters on the Norfolk Broads as it sat directly between the Acle Straight and the River Bure and had private moorings. In 2015, it was converted into a Hindu temple.

The Acle Straight experienced problems with subsidence. In 1908, a deep pile was planned but was abandoned after testing found the ground was stable only up to a depth of 11 feet (3.4 m).

== Traffic ==
The road is a notorious accident spot, with numerous fatalities. As it runs through the middle of uninhabited wetlands, there is no practical alternative route, and detours can be up to 30 miles (48 km). There have been proposals to widen the road to dual carriageway, but these have been rejected owing to environmental concerns.

== Cultural references ==
Several ghost stories have featured the Acle Straight. A driver passing the turning to the Halvergate branch spotted a man walking out into the middle of the road. Unable to stop, he drove straight through him. There have also been reports of a horse and cart crossing directly in front of oncoming traffic, and drivers have reported wanting to perform an emergency stop for no reason.

The Acle Straight is mentioned in the song "Stuck In A Rut" by local band The Darkness. The lyrics refer to the group trying to get out of their hometown of Lowestoft, with the road as one possible escape route.
