= James Cumming (chemist) =

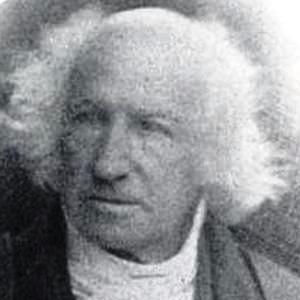
Professor Cumming in his seventies

James Cumming (26 September 1777 – 10 November 1861) was the ninth Professor of Chemistry in Cambridge from 1815 to 1860. Cumming is remembered for his research-led teaching and his lectures during which he would literally shock the audience with a galvanic apparatus. He was also known to electrocute a cat during a demonstration.

== Childhood and education ==
Cumming was born in Piccadilly, London, on 26 September 1777, but his home moved to the Buxton Hall Hotel (now called Old Hall Hotel) in Buxton where his father was the hotelier from 1791. His father rented the hall, which had been a home to Mary, Queen of Scots, from the 5th Duke of Devonshire. His father was considered socially more than a mere hotelier, and the hotel's clientele included bishops and visiting aristocracy.

Cumming was sent to school at Marlborough before he became a student at Trinity College, Cambridge. Graduating he took holy orders earlier than most aspiring academics under the Bishop of Lincoln, George Tomline, in 1802.

== Career ==
Cumming was appointed to the professorship in 1815, although no records survive of his work prior to that date. Like all professors at that time, he had to compete with rival professors for the attention of his students. Study of his curriculum reveals that he was keeping abreast of the current research in his subject. In 1816 he was admitted to the Royal Society, in company with Lord Byron, as well as to the Geological Society.

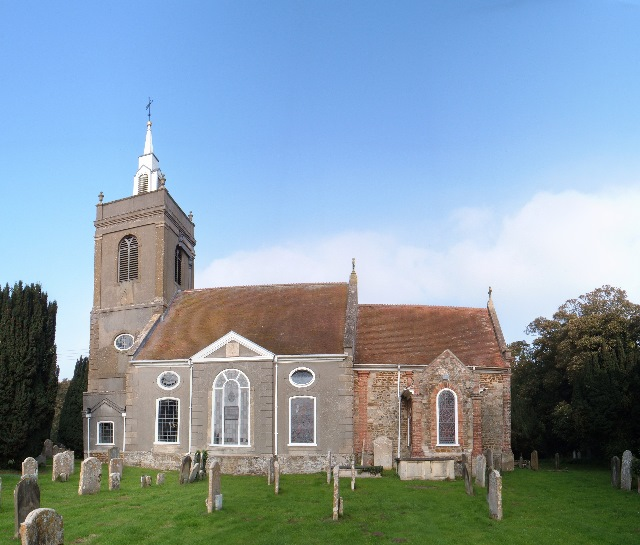
All Saints' Church in North Runcton where Cumming was rector.

In 1819 he was given the rectorship of North Runcton near King's Lynn. This small Norfolk parish of 400 people was "in the gift" of Trinity College and Daniel Gurney, the banker. With this substantial income he was able to marry Sarah Humphrey of Cambridge. In the same year Cumming was a founder member of the Cambridge Philosophical Society (Cumming was later to serve as its President).

Cumming was said to lecture every day in the 1820s accompanied by three assistants so that he could cover a large amount of material in an hour's lecture. His students included George Stokes and Charles Darwin's elder brother, Erasmus. Erasmus Darwin commented on the entertainment value of Cumming's lectures where Cumming compared the results of one of his experiments to artificial diamonds (they weren't). The professor would include many historical and literary anecdotes as he commented on the danger implicit in his experiments. He would point out where previous experiments had blown a hole in the ceiling and how other professors had been maimed by an ill-considered demonstration. His research included investigating galvanometers and electricity. He was noted for giving electric shocks to his audience and for a demonstration in which he would electrocute a cat. His style of teaching is highlighted today as he was an early example of science educators who were actively involved in research which informed, and inspired, their teaching.

In the 1840s his lectures did not attract the same audiences, but they were not compulsory to students if they were not taking medicine. Students at Cambridge could graduate in mathematics or in classics without taking any "professional" lectures in additional subjects like chemistry. Moreover, students were coming under increasing pressure to improve their performance in the core subjects.

Cumming died and was buried in All Saints Church in North Runcton. He had been the Professor in Cambridge until a year before his death on 10 November 1861.

== Works include ==
In 1827 Cumming published ‘'A Manual of Electro-Dynamics,’', 1827 (after Montferrand's ‘Manuel d'Electricité Dynamique,’) ‘Report on Thermo-Electricity’ in ‘Brit. Assoc. Reports,’ 1831–2
