= Little Melton =

Village in Norfolk, England

Coordinates: 52.616°N 1.195°E

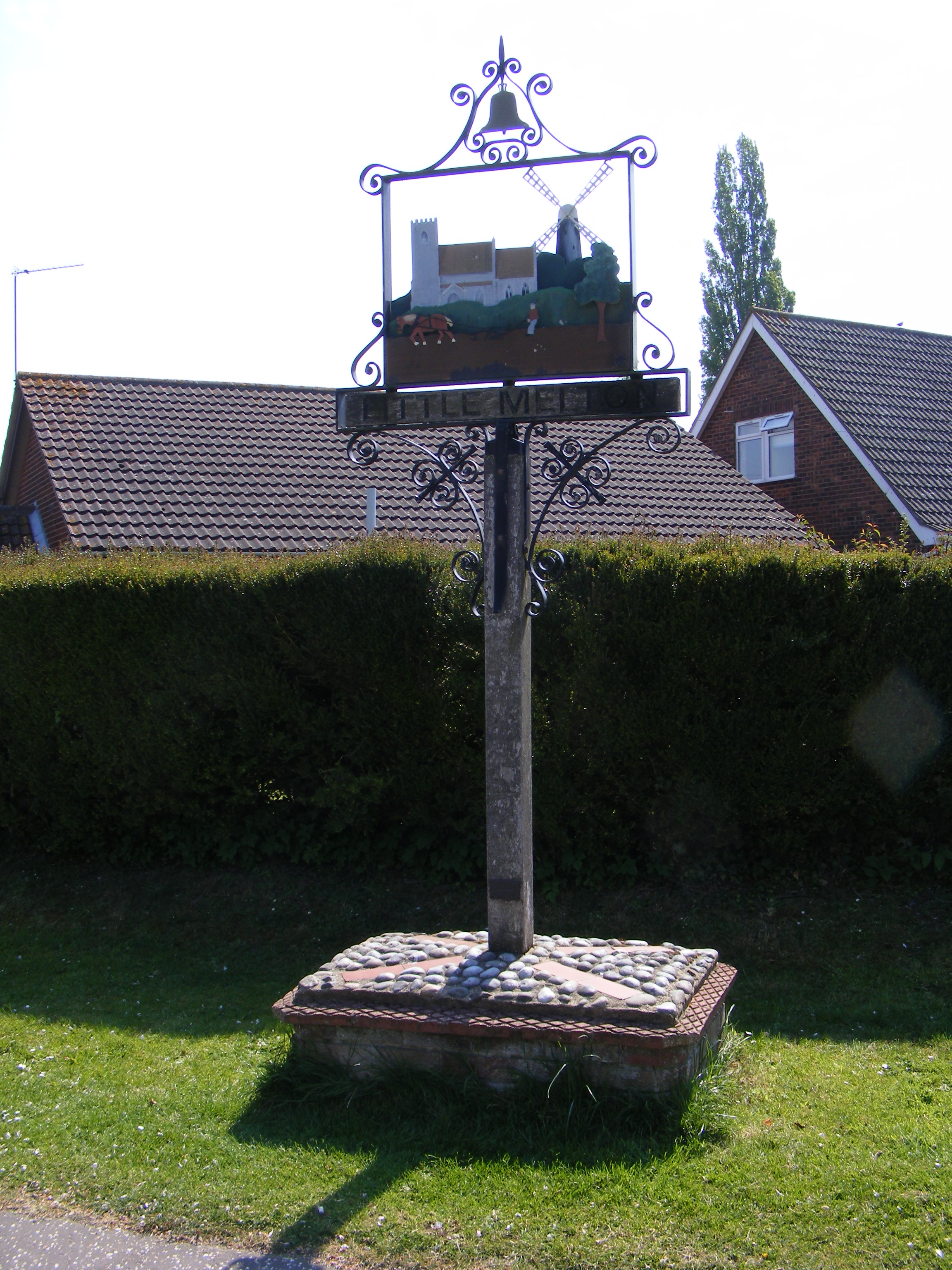
- Little Melton Village Sign

- Location within Norfolk
- Area: 1.06 sq mi (2.7 km^{2})
- Population: 1,050 (2021 census)
  - Density: 991/sq mi (383/km^{2})
- OS grid reference: TG164068
- Civil parish: Little Melton
- District: South Norfolk
- Shire county: Norfolk
- Region: East
- Country: England
- Sovereign state: United Kingdom
- Post town: NORWICH
- Postcode district: NR9
- Dialling code: 01603
- Police: Norfolk
- Fire: Norfolk
- Ambulance: East of England
- UK Parliament: South Norfolk

Little Melton is a village and civil parish in the English county of Norfolk. It is 4.5 miles (7.2 km) west of Norwich. The civil parish also includes the hamlet of Beckhithe.

At the 2021 census the parish had a population of 1,050, an increase from 897 at the 2011 census.

== History ==
Little Melton's name derives from Melton, a mixture of Old English and Scandinavian meaning "middle settlement". In the Domesday Book, it is listed as Parua Meltuna, Parua being Latin for little. It is recorded as a settlement of eight households in the hundred of Humbleyard. It was part of the estates of Godric the Steward. The tower of a windmill survives in Mill Lane.

== All Saints' Church ==
Little Melton's parish church dates from the 14th century. It is part of the Hethersett Benefice. The church includes a stained-glass depicting Saint Francis which was installed in 1968, as well as a series of medieval wall paintings including a curious warning against gossip.
