= Easton, Norfolk =

Village in Norfolk, England

Coordinates: 52.653°N 1.156°E

Easton
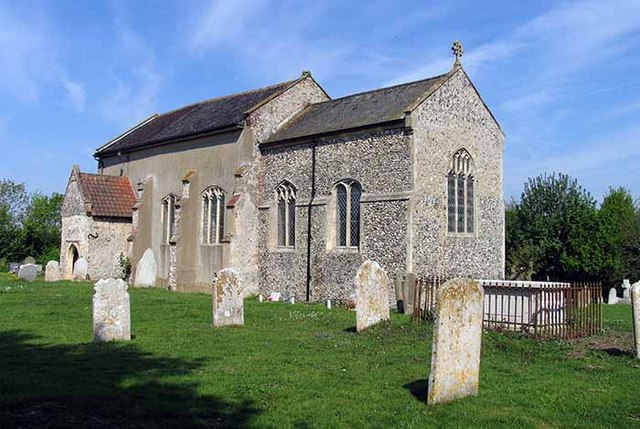
- St. Peter's Church

- Location within Norfolk
- Area: 2.41 sq mi (6.2 km^{2})
- Population: 1,436 (2021 census)
  - Density: 596/sq mi (230/km^{2})
- OS grid reference: TG135108
  - London: 95 miles (153 km)
- District: South Norfolk
- Shire county: Norfolk
- Region: East
- Country: England
- Sovereign state: United Kingdom
- Post town: NORWICH
- Postcode district: NR9
- Dialling code: 01603
- Police: Norfolk
- Fire: Norfolk
- Ambulance: East of England
- UK Parliament: South Norfolk

Easton is a village and civil parish in the English county of Norfolk.

Easton is located 6.2 miles (10.0 km) north-west of Norwich and 9 miles (14 km) east of Dereham, along the A47.

== History ==
Easton's name is of Anglo-Saxon origin and derives from the Old English for the eastern farmstead or settlement.

In the Nineteenth Century, archaeologists discovered a fourth century Roman hoard consisting of 4,000 coins, yet there is little evidence of any Roman settlement in the vicinity of Easton.

In the Domesday Book, Easton is listed as a settlement of 17 households in the hundred of Forehoe. In 1086, the village formed part of the East Anglian estates of Alan of Brittany.

== Geography ==
According to the 2021 census, Easton has a total population of 1,436 people which demonstrates a decrease from the 1,514 people listed in the 2011 census.

The A47, between Birmingham and Lowestoft, runs through the parish.

== St. Peter's Church ==
Easton's parish church is dedicated to Saint Peter and dates from the Fourteenth Century. St. Peter's is located within the village on Dereham Road and has been Grade I listed since 1959. St. Peter's was left towerless after a collapse in the Eighteenth Century, which was subsequently replaced by a bellcote which also does not survive.

St. Peter's was heavily restored in the Nineteenth Century by Richard Phipson with the large crucifix that hangs above the chancel arch originally hanging in St Gregory's Church, Norwich. The church font is a relic of the Thirteenth Century and is made out of Purbeck Marble.

== Royal Norfolk Showground ==
The Royal Norfolk Showground is located within the parish and has acted as the venue for the Royal Norfolk Show since the 1950s, when the Royal Norfolk Agricultural Association purchased the ground. Today, the showground features a 0.6 square kilometres (0.23 sq mi) open site with a 3,000 square metres (32,000 sq ft) indoor Showground Arena. The showground continues to host events throughout the year.

== Easton College ==
The parish is the site of Easton College, a large agricultural college offering courses in agriculture, horticulture and arboriculture. The college is centred around Easton Hall, an Eighteenth Century manor house with Grade II listed status.

== Amenities ==
The majority of local children attend Easton Primary School on Marlingford Road which is part of the East Anglian Schools Trust. In 2024, the school was awarded a Good rating by Ofsted.

Easton F.C. play home games at Easton College and play in the Anglian Combination League.

== Notable residents ==
- Cardinal Adam Easton- (1328–1397) Benedictine clergyman, born in Easton.

== Governance ==
Easton is an electoral ward for local elections and is part of the district of South Norfolk.

The village's national constituency is South Norfolk which has been represented by the Labour's Ben Goldsborough MP since 2024.

== War memorial ==
Easton's war memorial are two plaques inside St. Peter's Church which list the following names for the First World War:

Rank	Name	Unit	Date of death	Burial/Commemoration
LCpl.	Herbert S. Benington	2nd Bn., Wellington Regt., NZEF	31 Jul. 1917	Messines Ridge Memorial
Dvr.	Bertie E. Hook	12th Bn., Machine Gun Corps	11 Jul. 1918	Bagneux British Cemetery
Pte.	Edmund Mortimer	7th Bn., Bedfordshire Regiment	3 May 1917	Arras Memorial
Pte.	Edgar Bennington	1st Bn., Essex Regiment	13 Aug. 1915	Helles Memorial
Pte.	Arthur Scarfe	117th Coy., Machine Gun Corps	20 Sep. 1917	Tyne Cot
Pte.	Charles Burridge	1st Bn., Norfolk Regiment	26 Sep. 1914	Südfriedhof Cemetery
Pte.	Harry Mortimer	1st Bn., Norfolk Regt.	21 Nov. 1914	Menin Gate
Pte.	Frederick Burridge	4th Bn., Norfolk Regt.	9 Apr. 1915	St. Peter's Churchyard
Pte.	Edgar O. Springall	12th Bn., Norfolk Regt.	9 Dec. 1917	Jerusalem War Cemetery
Pte.	Albert Pease	17th Bn., Queen's Royal Regiment	5 Dec. 1916	Earlham Road Cemetery

And, the following for the Second World War:

Rank	Name	Unit	Date of death	Burial/Commemoration
CF4	John O. Dean	Royal Army Chaplains' Department	16 Apr. 1942	Kranji War Cemetery
Cpl.	Basil E. Hurrell	1st Bn., Duke of Wellington's Regiment	12 Feb. 1944	Cassino War Cemetery
Dvr.	Stanley W. Minns	Royal Army Service Corps	23 Jul. 1945	Yokohama War Cemetery
Pte.	Victor A. Hawkes	Royal Norfolk Regiment	27 Sep. 1939	St. Peter's Churchyard
