= Gull Wing Bridge =

Future road bridge in Lowestoft

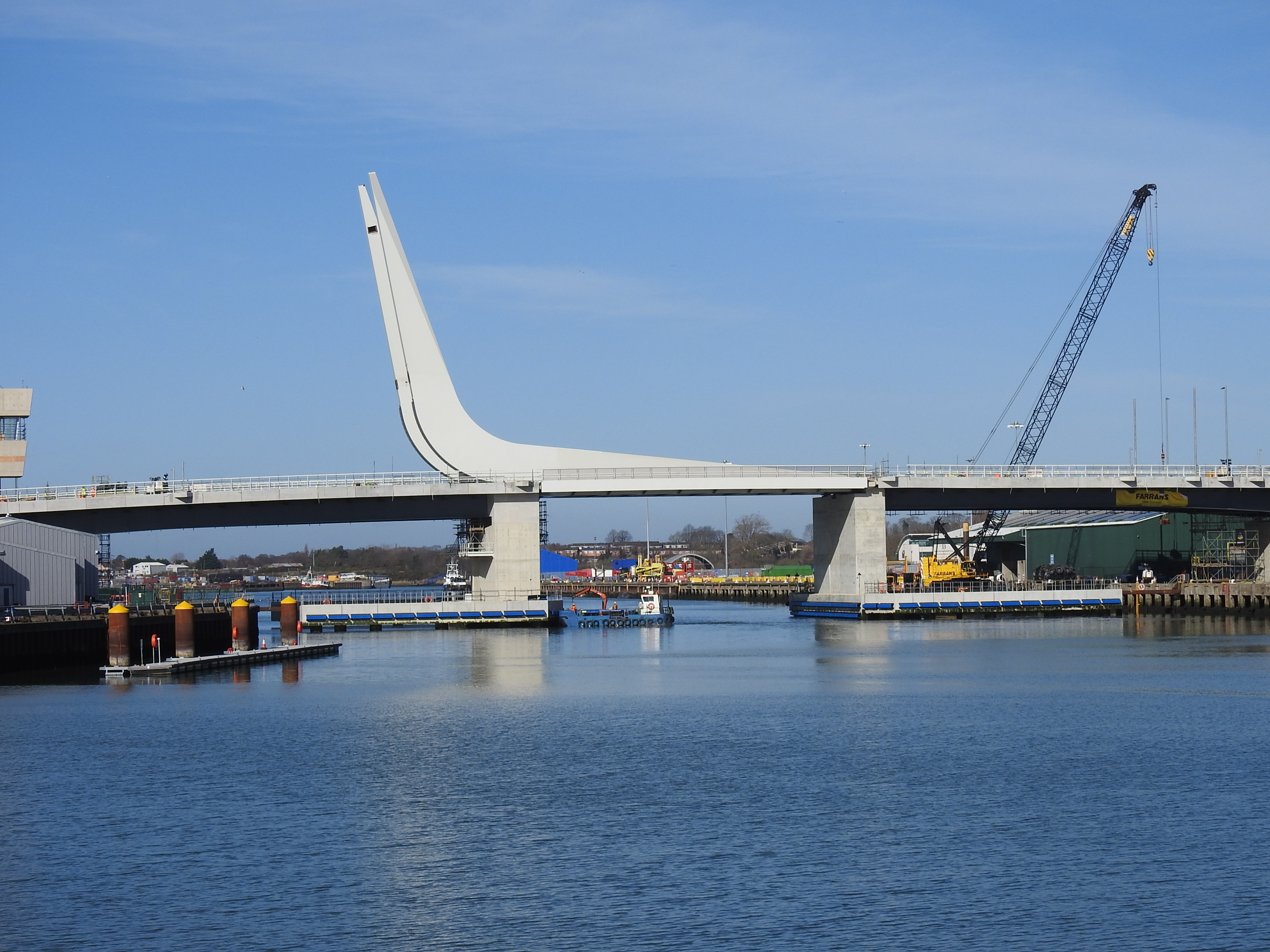
- Gull Wing Bridge crossing Lake Lothing, Lowestoft
- Coordinates: 52.474°N 1.733°E
- OS grid reference: TM536928
- Carries: Vehicles (A12 Road); Pedestrians
- Crosses: Lake Lothing; Lowestoft to Norwich line East Suffolk line
- Locale: Lowestoft, Suffolk
- Begins: Denmark Road; Peto Way (north)
- Ends: Waveney Drive (south)
- Named for: A gull's wings
- Owner: Suffolk County Council
- Website: gullwingbridge.co.uk

Characteristics
- Design: Arup; Bam Nuttall; Design Council Cabe
- Total length: 342m
- Width: 22m (maximum)
- Height: 62m (when open)
- No. of spans: 8
- Piers in water: 2
- Clearance below: 12 metres (39 ft) (High water); 6 metres (20 ft) (Railway)
- No. of lanes: 2 Vehicle Lanes; Shared Use Footway/Cycle Way
- Design life: 120 Years

History
- Constructed by: Farrans Construction
- Fabrication by: Victor Buyck Steel Construction
- Construction start: 22 March 2021
- Construction cost: £148 million (projected)
- Opening: 7 September 2024

Location
- Interactive map of Gull Wing Bridge

The Gull Wing Bridge is a rolling bascule bridge that spans Lake Lothing in the town of Lowestoft, Suffolk, England, and is the largest bridge of its kind in the world to date. Designed to be lifted using hydraulic cylinders and to be higher than the existing bascule bridge at the harbour mouth, it serves both as a new link for the arterial roads in the area, such as the A12, and as a means to try to reduce traffic congestion that frequently occurs in Lowestoft.

The idea of a third bridge crossing for Lowestoft was first suggested in 1918, with a proposed plan for the crossing at Lake Lothing being eventually approved in 2020. Construction of the bridge began a year later, and took three years to be completed, with the bascule span being constructed in Europe before being shipped to England for installation. The bridge's name, picked from several entries in a competition held amongst local schools, was inspired by the local gull population that are a common sight in the town. Originally planned for opening in Summer, delays led to the bridge being opened to traffic on 7 September 2024.

== History ==
The first proposal for a third crossing for Lowestoft was made in 1918, just after the First World War ended. Since the 19th century, Lowestoft was divided in two via connections made to Lake Lothing - one with the port development on the coastline, and the second via a canal lock between the western edge of Lothing and the Broads. Both of these water connections brought about the development of two swing bridges to provide two major arterial routes between the north and south side of the town; with the next crossing available for the residents to use being a bridge crossing south of the village of Haddiscoe. However, a key problem for the third bridge was finding a viable position along the 3 kilometres (1.9 mi) stretch of water between the two crossings.

Growth in road traffic in the 20th century, following World War II, soon exposed problems with the road layouts around the existing bridges at the time. With the harbour bridge - which was later replaced with a bascule bridge in 1972, and saw an estimated 14,000 vehicles using it each day - the constant opening of it to shipping moving in and out of the inner port led to regular traffic jams. With the western bridge - which was replaced with a lifting bascule bridge, the Mutford Bridge, following major rerouting of the A1117 in Oulton Broad in the 90's - the problem lay not with its opening, which was not as constant as its eastern counterpart, but with the railway crossing north of it used twice an hour by regular train services between Lowestoft and Norwich.

Increasing concerns about the traffic situation were raised towards council officials for Waveney and Suffolk politicians, but despite promises to provide a third crossing, particularly during local and general elections, little to no action was taken until the second half of the 2010s, when several proposals were put forward for the third bridge crossing. A key element of these plans was providing a suitable site where the bridge could be built; one proposal placed a third crossing a short distance from the harbour bridge with major road improvements to both access points, yet failed to explain how the regular traffic congestion would be allieviated with its layout.

=== Finalised proposal ===
By 2020, councillors gave approval to a plan that would see the construction of a bascule bridge over Lake Lothing, alongside its northern approach being raised over the main rail line into Lowestoft's main railway station. The height of the bridge would be higher than the inner port's water level at high tide, far more than with the existing bascule bridge, and thus would be required to raise far less for a smaller volume of shipping to and from the facilities and Lake Lothing stretch in the west, effectively reducing disruptions to road traffic moving between the northern and southern halves of the town. Alongside this, the proposal also required a reclassification of several roads around the town for the A12 and A146 respectively, with the bridge forming the establishment of a new arterial road through Lowestoft.

Planning permission was granted for the project in April, with the estimated cost of construction being put to around £94 million, but by August that same year the cost of construction had risen to £148 million through delays, the COVID-19 pandemic, and a desire to have a contingency fund "...should any unforeseen issues arise and caters for any further complications caused by coronavirus". The contract for its construction was initially tendered to BAM Nuttall, but this fell through and was later re-tendered to Farrans Construction. The name of the bridge was later decided upon after a competition amongst local schools. The winning name was chosen from an entry by three Year 6 students at Somerleyton Primary School in 2019, who were inspired by the shape of the bascule span's posts resembling the wings of gull, a common bird seen around Lowestoft.

=== Construction ===
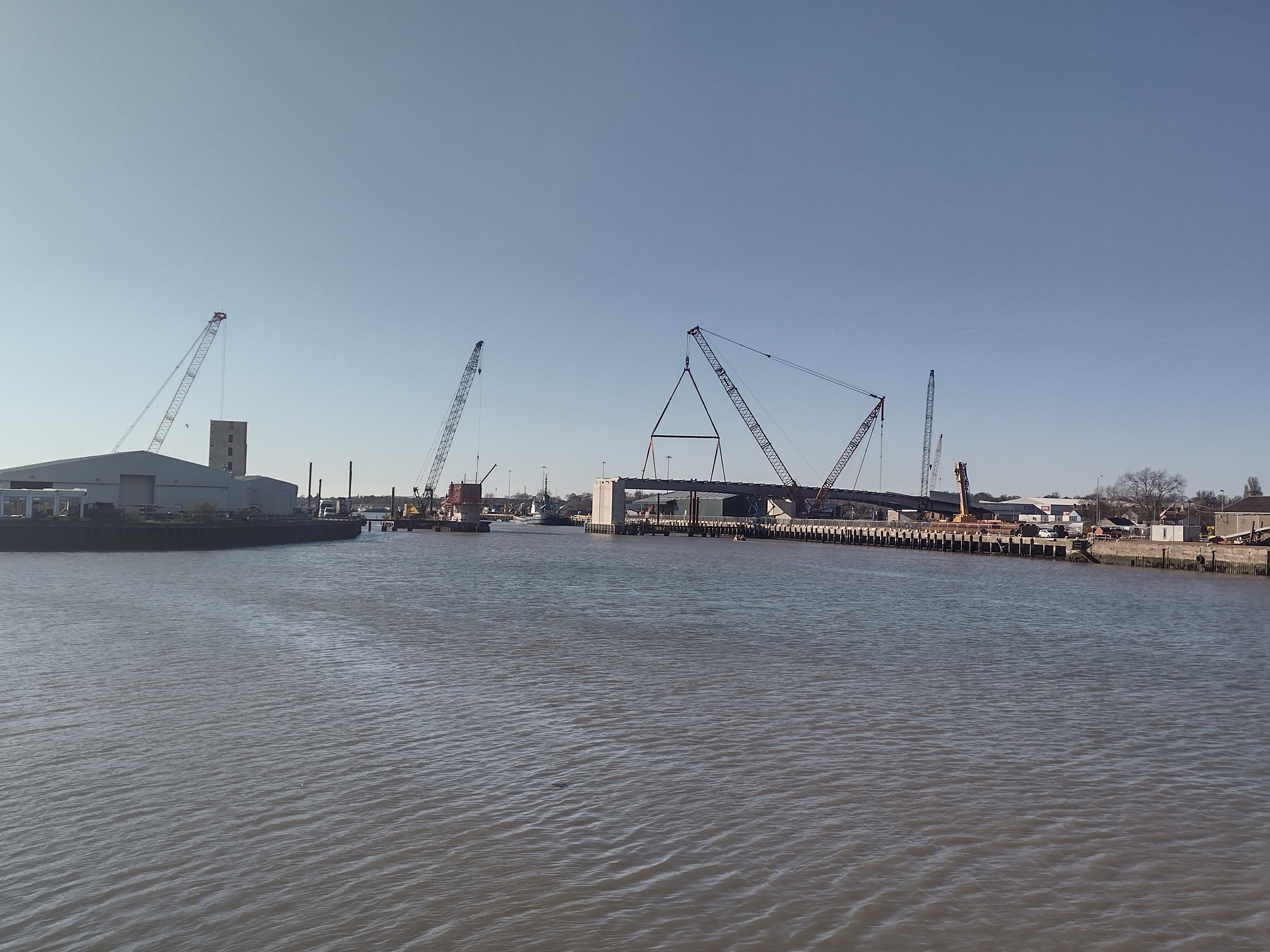
Construction of the Northern Approach

Preparatory work began in February 2021, including an unexploded ordnance survey within the water stretch of the bridge's location, with the official groundbreaking ceremony taking place on 22 March. Construction officially began in April, with piling work both on land and the water stretch beginning in June and July respectively, and the first section was complete by October 2022. Several of the ground piles for the bridge's foundation required them to be driven to 60 metres (200 ft) below ground level.

In September 2021, Waveney Drive was closed to through traffic, while work began on transforming its junction with Durban Road and the Riverside Business Park into a new roundabout connecting it to the Gull Wing's southern approach, along with dualing of the road to the junction with Tom Crisp Way; as part of the bridge's plan, Durban Road was closed off to Waveney Drive, while the business park received a new access road, Colin Law Way, which was completed in May 2022, and formally opened later that year. The new roundabout on Waveney Drive was completed in January 2023 and the road reopened to traffic that month. Denmark Road was later closed to through traffic in March to make way for construction of a new road layout to the northern approach, including a new roundabout and minor rerouting of the road; this stage of work took seven months, being completed in October, with the road and roundabout opened to traffic soon afterwards.

Installation of the bridge's steel deck sections began with the first section being installed on the Northern Approach Viaduct (NAV), completed in October 2022; remaining sections of the NAV were completed the following year in April. Work on the Southern Approach Viaducts (SAV), was completed in May 2023, with the Control tower's structure being completed two months before this. Surfacing work for the road and footpath sections of the NAV and SAV were completed by the end of 2023.

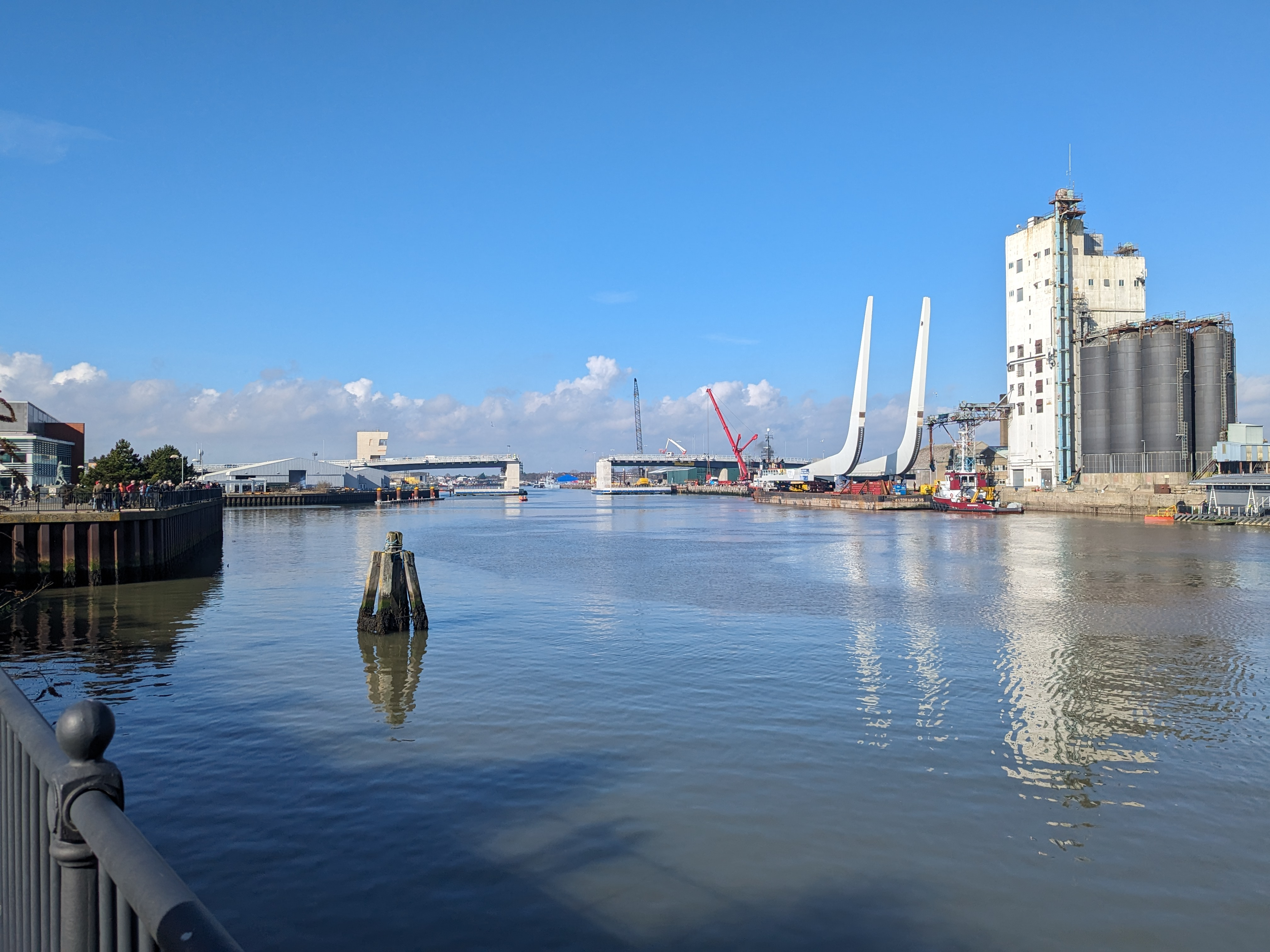
Main bascule span arriving in harbour for installation from Netherlands

The main bascule span, constructed in the Netherlands since work began in 2021, suffered delays for its transportation to Lowestoft by the beginning of 2024, owing to additional testing being required on the section. The section was eventually brought to Lowestoft in March 2024, with work to install it onto the bridge taking place over three weeks that month, with all shipping moving through the new channel for the bridge being suspended until installation was completed. Once the bascule span was in place, reliability testing took place over the next few months, alongside staff training, whilst signage and signal controls were installed, with this preparatory stage causing delays to the opening of the bridge. Work was eventually completed by the end of Summer, with the bridge opening to traffic and pedestrians on 7 September 2024 and an official opening ceremony finalised for November 2024.

== Gull Wing Bridge ==
The bridge's surface consists of a two-lane single carriageway with pedestrian and cycle footpaths on both sides. The bridge maintains a speed limit of 30 mph (50 km/h) for road traffic.

The bascule span of the bridge, which opens up southwards when required, lies around 12 metres (39 ft) above water level during high tides, with the space between the two main spans in the water being around 35 metres (115 ft) - safety features fitted to the span walls limit shipping with a maximum width of 32 metres (105 ft) to be able to pass through its channel. The NAV has ground clearance of around 6-metre (20 ft) over the railway line to Lowestoft station for trains. Road access in the south is via Waveney Drive, while in the north it is via Peto Way and Denmark Road.

== Reclassification of Roads ==
Due to the Gull Wing Bridge being designed to become part of the A12 road, several roads around Lowestoft were reclassified to reflect the new primary route that will run through the town upon completion of the bridge. These changes will include the following:

- A stretch of the Waveney Drive that is encompassed by the B1531, between the Tom Crisp Roundabout and the new Gull Wing's southern roundabout, was reclassified as part of the A12 on the southern side.
- The stretch of the former A1117 between Cotmer Road and Peto Way, encompassing Normanston Drive, Bridge Road and Saltwater Way, was reclassified as the A146.
- The stretch of the former A1117 covering Millennium Way and Peto Way north of the Normanston Drive roundabout was reclassified as the A12.
- Peto Way south of the Normanston Drive roundabout, and a portion of Denmark Road linking it to the new Gull Wing's northern roundabout, was reclassified as part of the A12 route on the northern side.
