= Port of Lowestoft =

Coordinates: 52.473°N 1.740°E

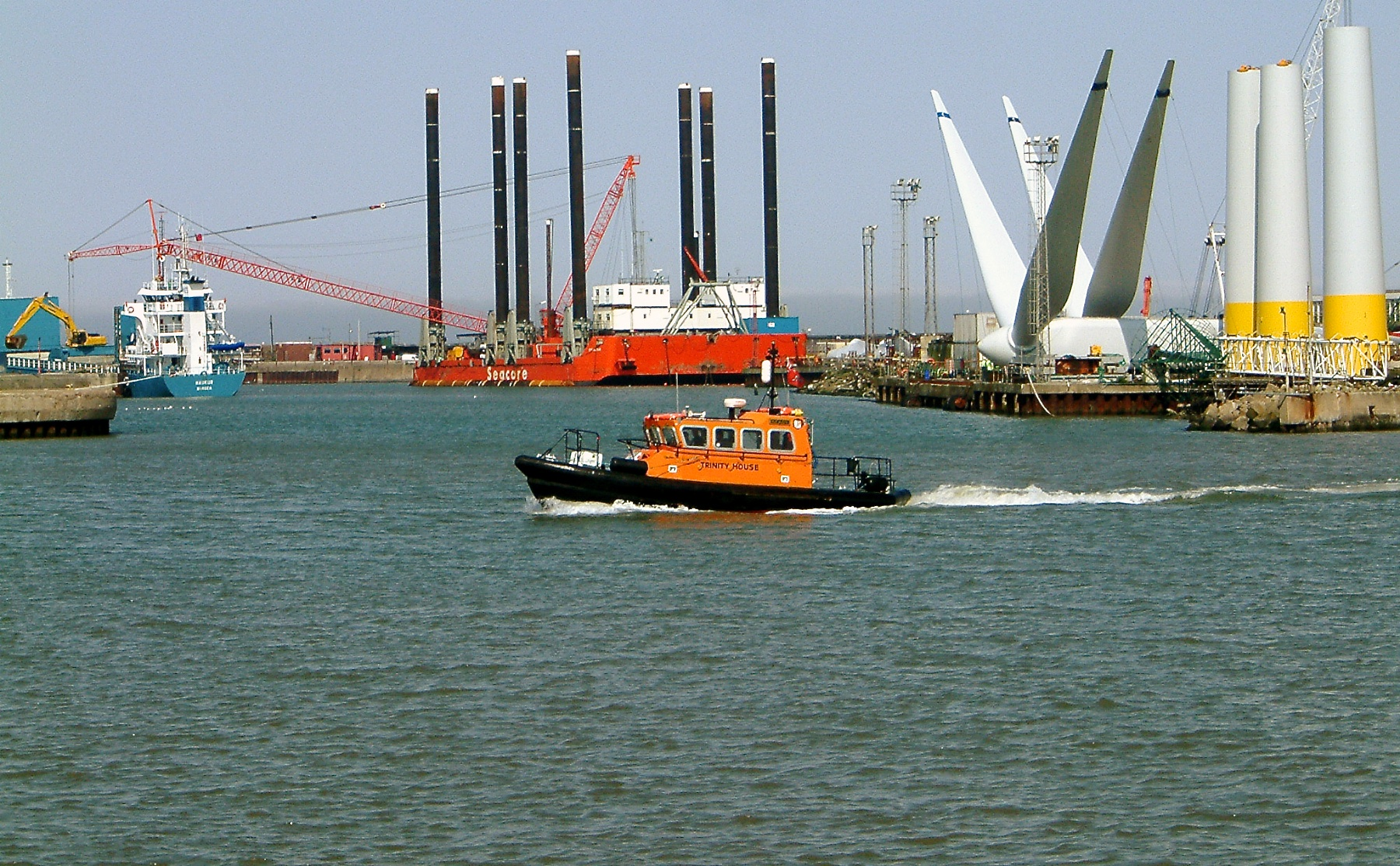
Windfarm construction in Lowestoft harbour

The Port of Lowestoft is a harbour and commercial port in Lowestoft in the English county of Suffolk owned by Associated British Ports. It is the most easterly harbour in the United Kingdom and has direct sea access to the North Sea. The harbour is made up of two sections divided by a bascule bridge. The inner harbour is formed by Lake Lothing whilst the outer harbour is constructed from breakwaters. Lowestoft handles around 30,000 tonnes of cargo per year.

Traditionally the harbour was the site for an extensive fishing industry as well as engineering and shipbuilding companies such as Brooke Marine, Richards and Boulton and Paul. The offshore oil and gas industry has also operated from the harbour with Shell maintaining their Southern Operations base in the harbour from the mid-1960s until 2003. Today, the Port is a hub for renewable offshore energy generation, with companies including SSE and Scottish Power Renewables having their maintenance & operations bases at Lowestoft.

== History ==
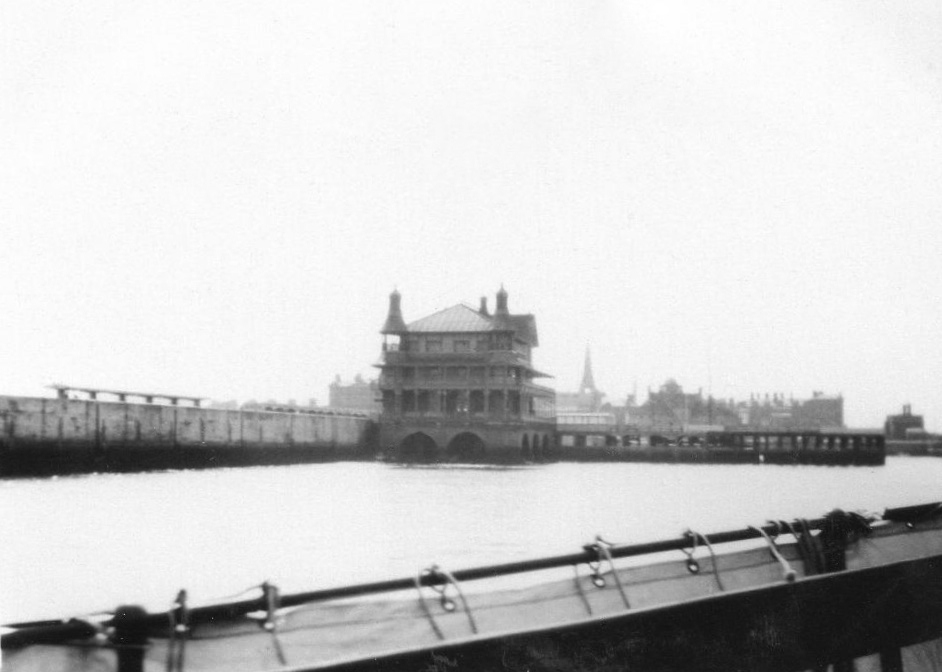
The harbour in the 1930s.

The harbour was originally built by the Lowestoft and Norwich Navigation Company and developed by the Norfolk Railway following the construction of the Norwich to Lowestoft railway. The original Inner Harbour was constructed in 1831 when Lake Lothing was joined to the sea, as shown on a chart based on a survey by William Hewett of HMS Fairy dated 1834, while the Outer Harbour was constructed in 1937. The railway line ran along the north side of the docks and a series of docks railway sidings were used mainly for fishing and freight wagons. These lines have mainly been removed from service but in places sections of the track can be seen.

The development of the harbour led to a rapid growth in the fishing industry and associated engineering, including ship building companies such as Brooke Marine, Richards and Boulton and Paul. Large scale ship building, which included the building of vessels for the Royal Navy, continued into the 1980s. The fishing heritage of the harbour is celebrated through the museum ship Mincarlo which is usually berthed in the yacht harbour during the summer.

The East Anglian Ice and Cold Storage Company, founded by William Fredrick Cockrell in 1897, purchased a section of quay on south side of Lake Lothing from LNER. The factory produced 75 tons of ice a day and was powered by a 300-horsepower horizontal double-acting Robey steam engine. Water from Lake Lothing was used to cool the ammonia condenser coils used to produce ice. The factory moved to the main harbour in 1962 to facilitate better loading of ice to the trawler fleet. It closed in 1988 after 100 years.

The harbour was used as a naval base during World War I and World War II, particularly for the operation of auxiliary vessels, including armed trawlers such as Nelson and Ethel & Millie which were used to combat enemy U-boat action in the North Sea. The Royal Naval Patrol Service had its central depot in Lowestoft during World War II and a total of five naval bases were established in the town, primarily for minesweeping and coastal defence duties.

== Features ==
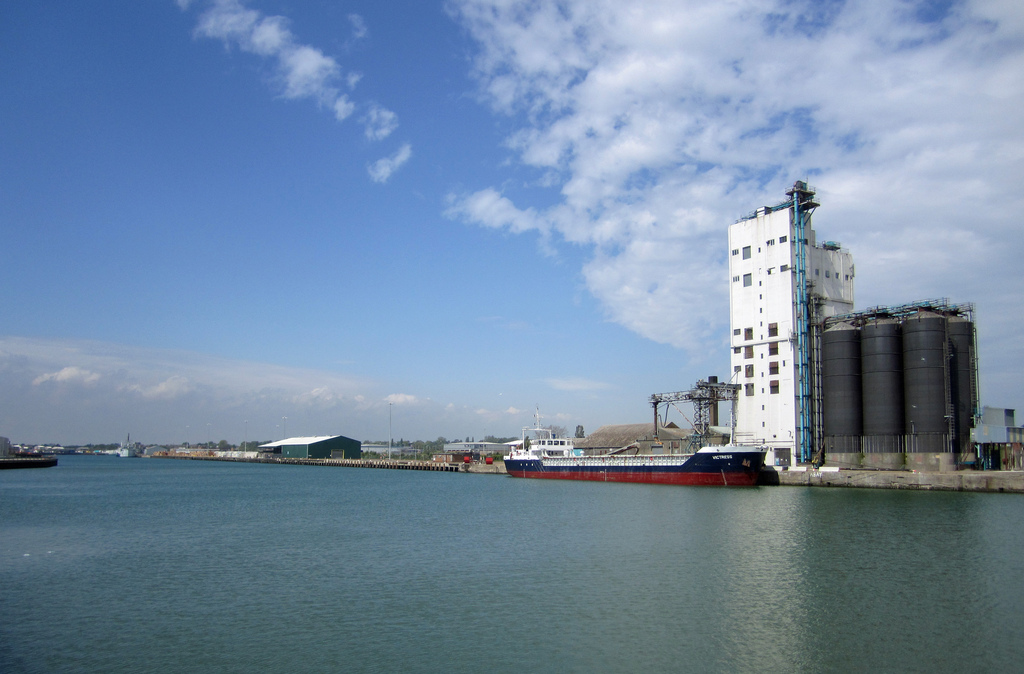
Lowestoft harbour in 2011

The port's main entrance can accommodate vessels up to 35 metres in width, with vessels 22 metres wide being able to access the inner harbour through the bascule bridge. The harbour is able to service vessels up to 125 metres in length. The port has services for agribulks, offshore wind, liquid bulks and project cargo. There is also a marine gas bunkering facility, with a maximum capacity of around 1,000 MTs across 7 tanks. Modern transit sheds and a 14,000 tonne silo are available with a range of cranes and other facilities including a container terminal. There are also facilities for ship repairs, including a dry dock and a number of slipways.

Mutford Lock links the inner harbour to Oulton Broad from where Oulton Dyke provides access to the River Waveney and Broads system.

Lowestoft Lifeboat Station (RNLI) is located at the mouth of the outer harbour and has an all-weather Shannon-class lifeboat.

== Industries ==
The harbour remains the site of Lowestoft fish market, although by 2011 only three traders remained. The long-term future of the fish market is under threat as the port seeks to redevelop, with only a small fishing fleet remaining in the ports Hamilton Dock.

The port remains a centre for the oil and gas industries in the southern North Sea, including the construction of oil and gas platforms. It is attempting to develop as a centre for renewable energy within East Anglia, including the construction of wind turbines and developing tidal and wave power. Some ship building and repair still goes on in the harbour. The port stores emergency response equipment in case of an oil spill off the Suffolk coast resulting from ship to ship oil transfers.

The harbour is the focus for redevelopment proposals for Lowestoft as part of the Lake Lothing and Outer Harbour Area Action Plan submitted in February 2011. The plan focusses on the redevelopment of brownfield sites in and around the harbour area to create jobs, particularly in the renewable energy and retailing sectors.

The harbour is also a centre for the leisure industry with a prestigious yacht club and several marinas for leisure vessels, who frequently visit the town.
