= New Cut =

New Cut may refer to:

- Haddiscoe Cut, on the Norfolk Broads, England
- The New Cut (Bristol) of the River Avon, Bristol, England
- The Cut, London, a street previously called the New Cut
