= Shelfanger Meadows =

Protected area in Norfolk, England

Coordinates: 52.403°N 1.099°E

- Site of Special Scientific Interest
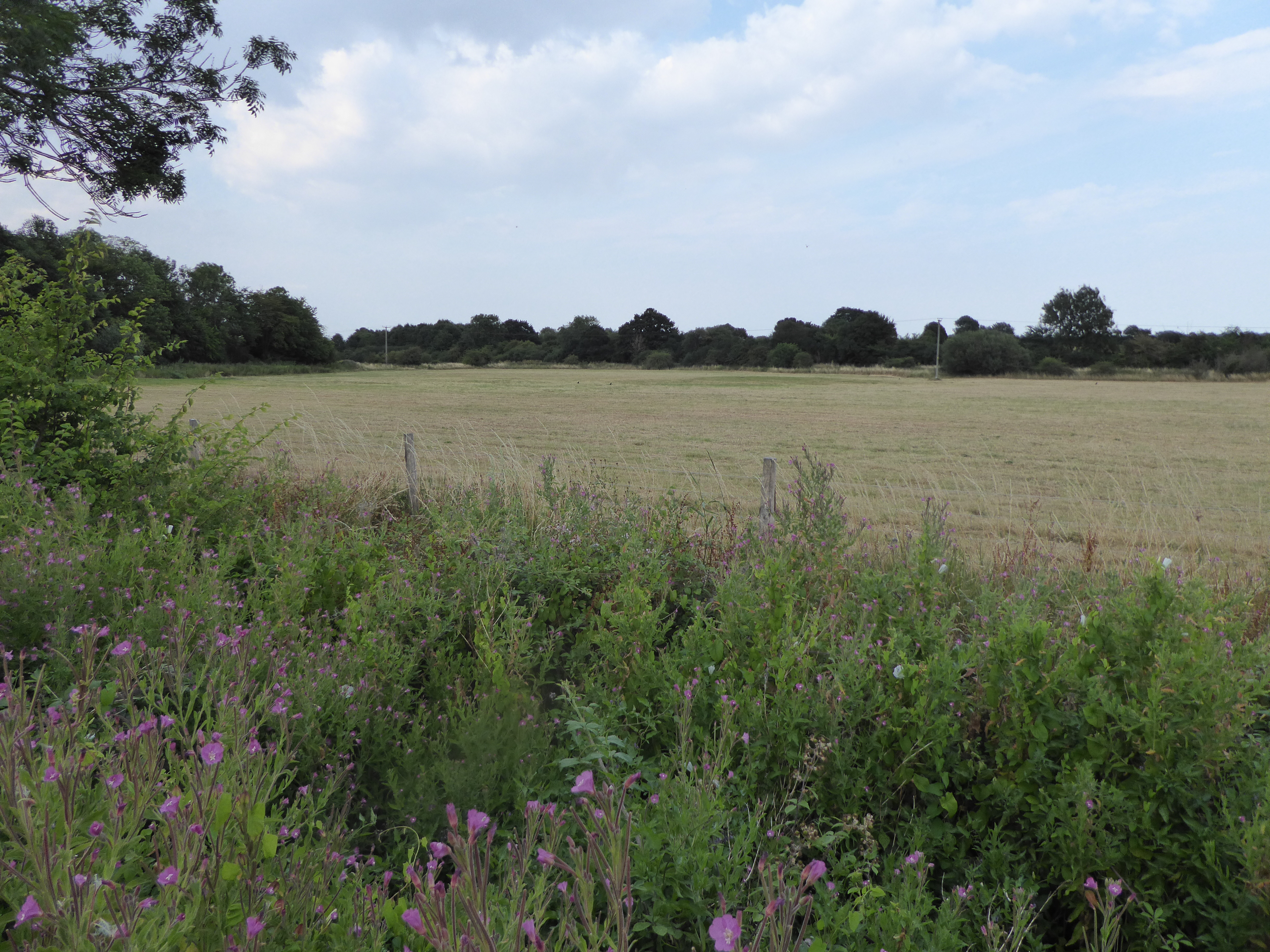
- Location of Shelfanger Meadows.
- Area of search: Norfolk
- Grid reference: TM 109 828
- Interest: Biological
- Area: 10.3 hectares (25 acres)
- Notification date: 1988
- Location map: Magic Map

Shelfanger Meadows is a 10.3-hectare (25-acre) biological Site of Special Scientific Interest north of Diss in Norfolk, England.

This site in the valley of a tributary of the River Waveney is described by Natural England as "one of the most important areas of unimproved grassland in Norfolk". It has been traditionally managed by a hay cut followed by grazing for hundreds of years, and as a result its flora is rich, including uncommon species. There are also areas where springs make the grassland marshy.

The site is private land with no public access.
