= SLP Engineering =

British construction company

SLP Engineering, also known as Sembmarine SLP, is a construction company in Lowestoft that builds gas platforms for the North Sea and offshore industry. It is part of Seatrium.

== History ==
Sea & Land Pipe Lines Ltd was founded on 7 March 1967. SLP Engineering was based in London. In the company was Sea and Land Pipelines (Production). Another division was SLP Fabricating Engineers.

On 23 September 2009, the company was visited by the Princess Royal. In November 2009, the company entered administration; at the time the company employed around 900 people. It was owned by Smulders of the Netherlands, then bought by SembCorp Marine in October 2012 for £2.5m.

== Structure ==
It is a subsidiary of SembCorp Marine, an EPC constructor. The site in Lowestoft is situated off the A12 in the Port of Lowestoft.

== See also ==
- Consafe Engineering of Scotland, builds accommodation modules for North Sea platforms
