= Haddiscoe Cut =

Canal in the Norfolk Broads, England

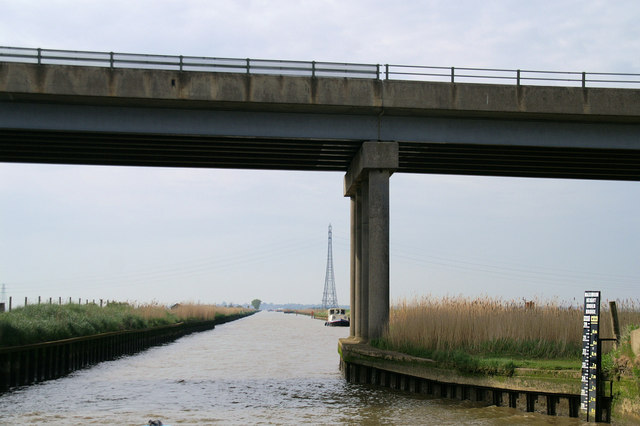
- The bridge carrying the A143 over the Cut

Specifications
- Maximum boat length: 46 ft 0 in (14.02 m)
- Maximum boat beam: 18 ft 0 in (5.49 m)
- Locks: 0
- Maximum height AMSL: 0 ft (0 m) (tidal - 3ft rise)
- Status: Navigable
- Navigation authority: The Broads Authority

History
- Original owner: Norwich and Lowestoft Navigation Co
- Principal engineer: William Cubitt
- Date of act: 1827
- Date of first use: 1833

Geography
- Start point: Reedham, River Yare
- End point: Haddiscoe, River Waveney

The Haddiscoe Cut or New Cut is a canal in the English county of Norfolk and in The Broads National Park. The cut was conceived as a way to provide a more direct route from Lowestoft to Norwich, and was built as part of a larger scheme which included the linking of the River Waveney to Oulton Broad and Lake Lothing. It was opened in 1833, but the new route was not a financial success, and it was sold to a railway developer in 1842. It remained in railway ownership until nationalisation in 1948, and was damaged by floods in 1953. An attempt to close it in 1954 was resisted by local interests, resulting in it being repaired. It is now managed by the Environment Agency.

== History ==
Prior to the 1820s, Norwich was served by vessels using the River Yare, which flows through Breydon Water before joining the River Bure and then the North Sea near Great Yarmouth. Breydon Water is a wide expanse of shallow water, and therefore required cargo arriving at Yarmouth to be trans-shipped into smaller vessels which could then reach Norwich. There was discontent among the merchants of Norwich at the cost of trans-shipment, and allegations of systematic theft of cargo, which resulted in a court case in 1820, when 18 men were convicted of taking the goods and another of receiving it. Against this background, William Cubitt was asked to investigate possible solutions in 1814.

Norwich and Lowestoft Navigation Act 1827
- Act of Parliament
- Parliament of the United Kingdom
- Long title: An Act for making and maintaining a navigable Communication for Ships and other Vessels between the City of Norwich and the Sea, at or near Lowestoft in the County of Suffolk.
- Citation: 7 & 8 Geo. 4. c. xlii

Dates
- Royal assent: 28 May 1827

Text of statute as originally enacted

Cubitt's first plan involved general improvements to the River Yare, and the dredging of a deeper channel along the southern edge of Breydon Water. He estimated that this would cost £35,000, and his plan was published in 1818, but there were immediate objections from the Corporation of Yarmouth, who called on the engineer John Rennie for advice. Rennie concluded that the plan would lead to the silting of Yarmouth harbour. Cubitt therefore looked at alternatives, and produced a plan to link the Yare to Lowestoft, which would cost over £70,000. Yarmouth again objected, but a bill based on the new plan was put before Parliament in 1826. It was defeated, but a second bill was presented, which was passed as the Norwich and Lowestoft Navigation Act 1827 (7 & 8 Geo. 4. c. xlii) on 28 May 1827, despite vigorous campaigning against it by Yarmouth.

=== Construction ===
The new act of Parliament created the Norwich and Lowestoft Navigation Company, and authorised them to raise £100,000, with an additional £50,000 if required. The scheme involved dredging of the River Yare from Norwich to Reedham, to make it deeper, construction of the 2.5-mile (4.0 km) Haddiscoe cut between Reedham and Haddiscoe on the River Waveney, enlarging of Oulton Dyke, between the Waveney and Oulton Broad, and linking of Oulton Broad to Lake Lothing by a channel which was 0.25 miles (0.40 km) long, and included a sea lock, so that it could be used at all states of the tide. Work began on the Lake Lothing link, with most of it completed during 1829. The lock was 150 by 50 feet (46 by 15 m), and included a system of sluices, which used water from Oulton Broad to clear a channel to the sea through Lake Lothing. A demonstration of this was given on 3 June 1831, when it was estimated that 3,000 tons of stones and shingle were carried out to sea.

The contract for the Haddiscoe Cut was signed with Thomas Townsend of Birmingham on 3 July 1832, and work began at once. Thomas Townsend worked as contractor on the canal throughout its construction. The original capital was insufficient to finance the construction, and so the extra £50,000 authorised by the Public Works Loans Act 1817 (57 Geo. 3. c. 34) was borrowed from the Exchequer Bill Loan Commissioners. The cut was finished in 1832, and the dredging of the River Yare completed in 1833. The whole route, which is 32 miles (51 km) long, was formally opened on 30 September 1833.

=== Operation ===
The new undertaking was not a financial success, with income failing to match expenditure. The company was unable to repay the £50,000 loan, and so in 1842 the Exchequer Bill Loan Commissioners took control of the navigation, and sold it to Sir Samuel Morton Peto, a developer who wanted to build railways along its banks. The line from Reedham to Lowestoft runs parallel to the cut and effectively forms the south western bank. Although maintained for navigation, the cut was owned by a series of railway companies for the next hundred years.

Control of the cut passed to the British Transport Commission (BTC) with the nationalisation of the railways in 1948. The cut was damaged by the floods of 1953, which affected much of the East Coast, and the BTC attempted to close it in 1954. Local opposition was strong, particularly from the yachting community, and control of it passed to the East Suffolk and Norfolk River Board in 1957, under provisions that were part of the British Transport Commission Act 1958 (6 & 7 Eliz. 2. c. xliv). The BTC no longer wanted to maintain the waterway, as there was little commercial traffic using it. The river board were required to spend at least £24,000 on repairing the banks of the cut, although the BTC would give them £10,000 to assist, and the commissioners of the River Yare would contribute another £10,000 in the two years following the transfer. The river board were required to maintain the waterway for navigation for at least ten years, but after that could decide to close it and all rights of navigation would be removed. Subsequently, the Anglian Water Authority, and in 1995 the Environment Agency, took over responsibility for managing the cut.

== Today ==
In 1993 failure of the piling resulted in part of the railway embankment being washed away. More recently, flood prevention measures have resulted in reconstruction of the river defences and walls, and this work was completed in 2006. High water levels combined with low sections of flood defences and severe flooding in January 2022 resulted in part of the railway embankment being washed away again, resulting in further steel piling to rebuild the bank.

== Route ==
Point	Coordinates (Links to map resources)	OS Grid Ref	Notes
Norwich	52.630°N 1.299°E	TG232089	Destination for cargo
Start of cut	52.556°N 1.579°E	TG426014	Jn with River Yare
End of cut	52.532°N 1.620°E	TM456989	Jn with R Waveney
Oulton Dyke	52.490°N 1.682°E	TM500943	Jn with R Waveney
Lowestoft	52.473°N 1.753°E	TM549927	harbour

== See also ==
- Canals of the United Kingdom
- History of the British canal system

== Bibliography ==
- Boyes, John; Russell, Ronald (1977). The Canals of Eastern England. David and Charles. ISBN 978-0-7153-7415-3.
- Skempton, A. W. (2002). A Biographical Dictionary of Civil Engineers in Great Britain and Ireland - Vol 1: 1500 to 1830. Thomas Telford. ISBN 0-7277-2939-X.
- Wren, Wilfrid John (1976). Ports of the Eastern Counties. Terence Dalton Limited. ISBN 978-0-900963-70-4.

=== References ===
- Ordnance Survey (2005). OS Explorer Map OL40 - The Broads. ISBN 0-319-23769-9.
- Waterscape: Haddiscoe New Cut
