= Syleham Windmill =

Windmill in Syleham, Suffolk, England

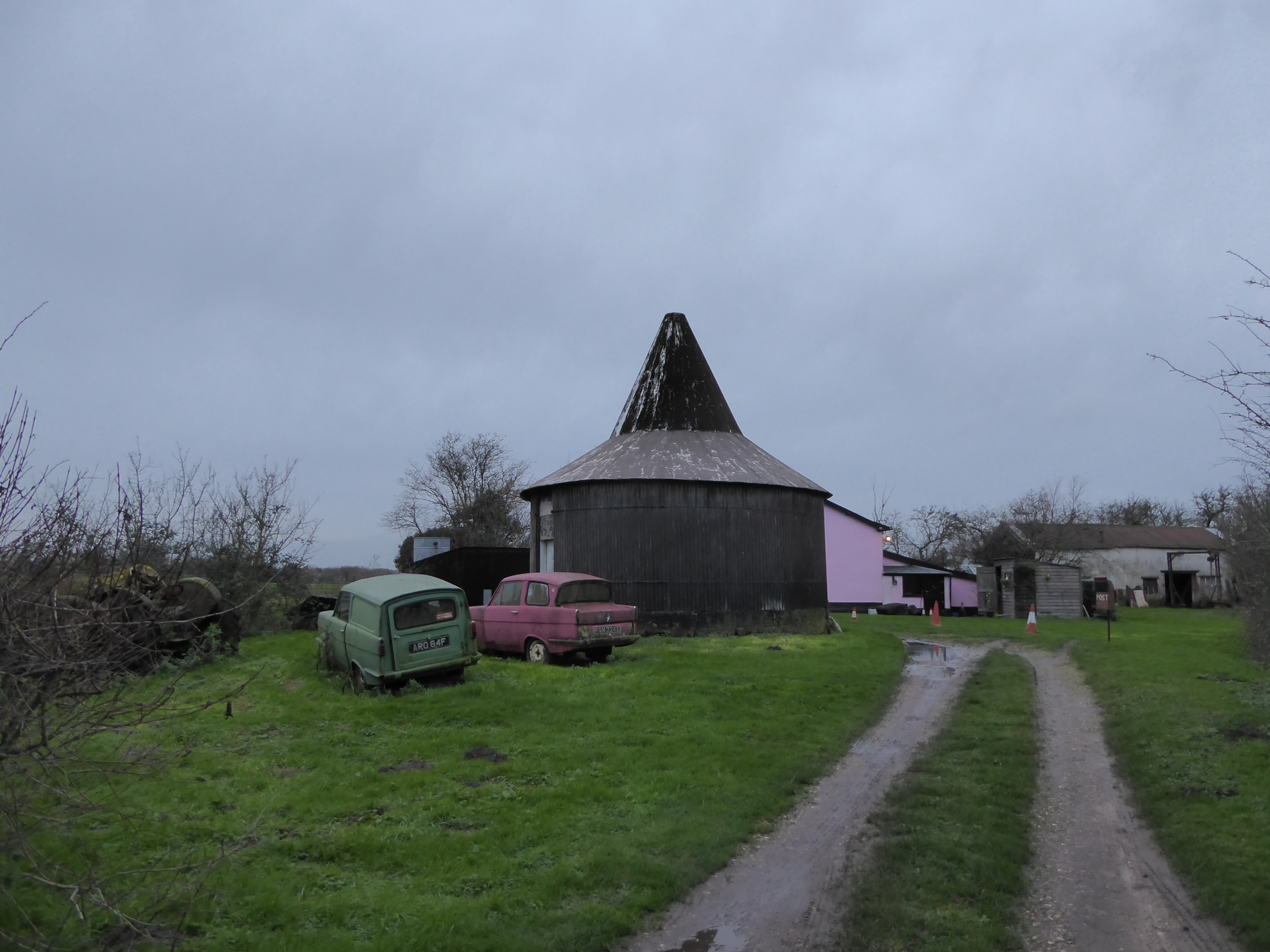
- Interactive map of Syleham Windmill

Origin
- Mill name: Syleham Mill
- Mill location: TM 214 777
- Coordinates: 52°21′09″N 1°15′07″E
- Year built: 1823

Information
- Purpose: Corn mill
- Type: Post mill
- Roundhouse storeys: Two storeys
- No. of sails: Four sails
- Type of sails: Spring sails
- Winding: Fantail
- Fantail blades: Six blades
- No. of pairs of millstones: Two pairs, plus one pair in roundhouse driven by oil engine.
- Year lost: 1987

Syleham Windmill was a Grade II listed post mill at Syleham, Suffolk, England which was built in 1730 at Wingfield and moved to Syleham in 1823. It was blown down on 16 October 1987. The remains of the mill survive today, comprising the roundhouse and trestle.

== History ==
The mill was originally one of a pair on Wingfield Green. Both mills came into the ownership of Robert Sparkes in 1820. He believed that the mills were too close to each other and so moved one of them 2 miles (3.2 km) to Syleham in 1823. In 1839 she was owned by George Dye. He died in 1847 and the mill was purchased by John Bokenham, who sold it to John Bryant in 1848. He died in 1865 and the mill was run by his widow, Sarah until 1874 when their son James took the mill. James Bryant died in 1907 and the mill passed to his son Arthur, who installed a Ruston & Hornsby engine to drive an additional pair of millstones in the roundhouse. The mill survived a lightning strike in 1936. When Arthur Bryant died, the mill was left to his daughter, who sold it to Jack Penton in 1945. The mill survived being tailwinded in July 1946 and two of the sails were smashed against the roundhouse. Repairs were carried out by millwright Jesse Wightman. Two new sails being made from the remains of the four previously on the mill, and the side girts were strengthened. In 1949, the mill was sold to Elizabeth Jillard. The breast stones were transferred to the roundhouse. The mill was worked by wind until 1951, latterly on two sails and an oil engine powered a pair of millstones in the roundhouse until 1967. The mill was sold in that year to Ivor Wingfield, grandson of Arthur Bryant. In 1974, some repair work was done to the roundhouse funded by a grant of £400 from Suffolk County Council. Full restoration of the mill was planned at the time. The mill was blown down on 16 October 1987 when one of the front corner posts failed. The remains of the mill body were removed in June 2007.

== Description ==
Syleham Mill was a post mill on a two-storey roundhouse. The roundhouse is built of clunch. The four Spring sails were carried on a cast iron windshaft and powered two pairs of millstones arranged head and tail. The Head wheel and tail wheel were both of wooden clasp arm construction. The mill was winded by a fantail arranged in the Suffolk style. An oil engine latterly powered an additional pair of millstones in the roundhouse.

== Millers ==
- Robert Sparkes 1823
- George Dye 1839–47
- John Bokenham 1847–48
- John Bryant 1848–67
- Sarah Ann Bryant 1867–74
- James Bryant 1874–1907
- Arthur John Bryant 1907–36
- Jack Penton 1945–49
- Elizabeth Jillard 1949–67

References for above:-
