= Syleham =

Coordinates: 52.35°N 1.24°E

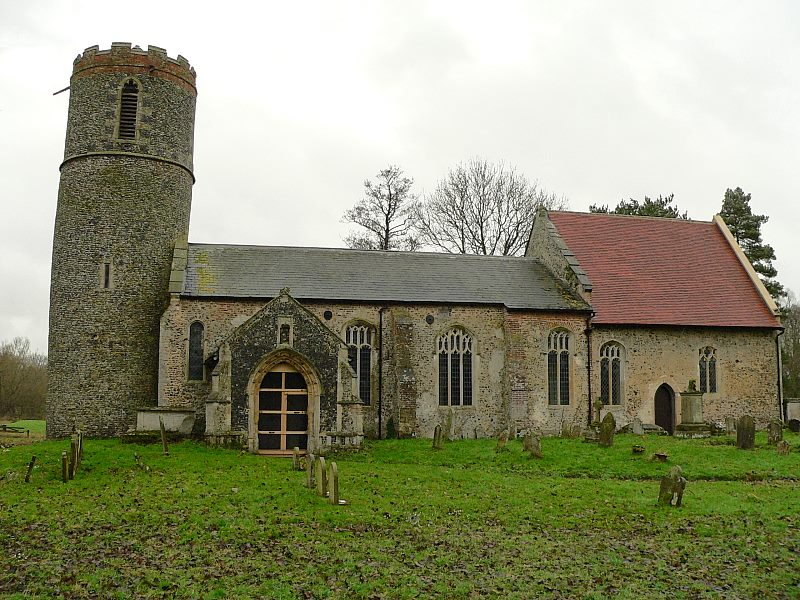
- Syleham St Margaret

- Location within Suffolk
- Population: 180 (2011)
- District: Mid Suffolk
- Shire county: Suffolk
- Region: East
- Country: England
- Sovereign state: United Kingdom
- Post town: EYE
- Postcode district: IP21
- Dialling code: 01379
- UK Parliament: Waveney Valley

Syleham is a small parish, next to the River Waveney in Suffolk, England, about six miles east of Diss.

Its church, St Margaret, is one of 38 existing round-tower churches in Suffolk. The windmill was one of the casualties of the Great Storm of 1987.
