= Lake Lothing =

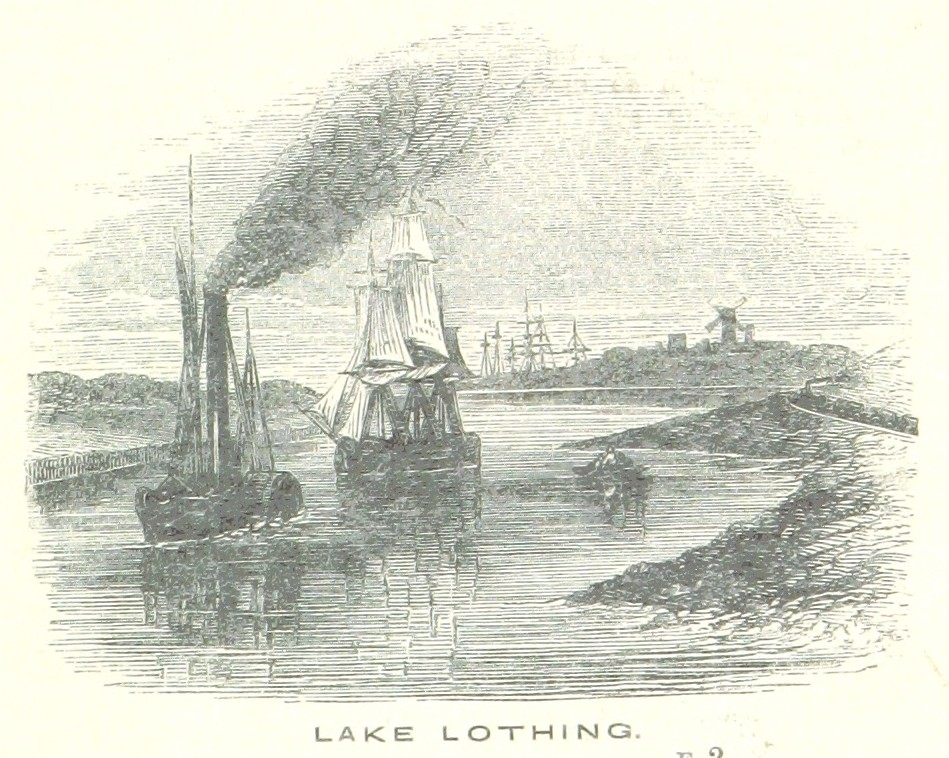
- Lake Lothing in 1851

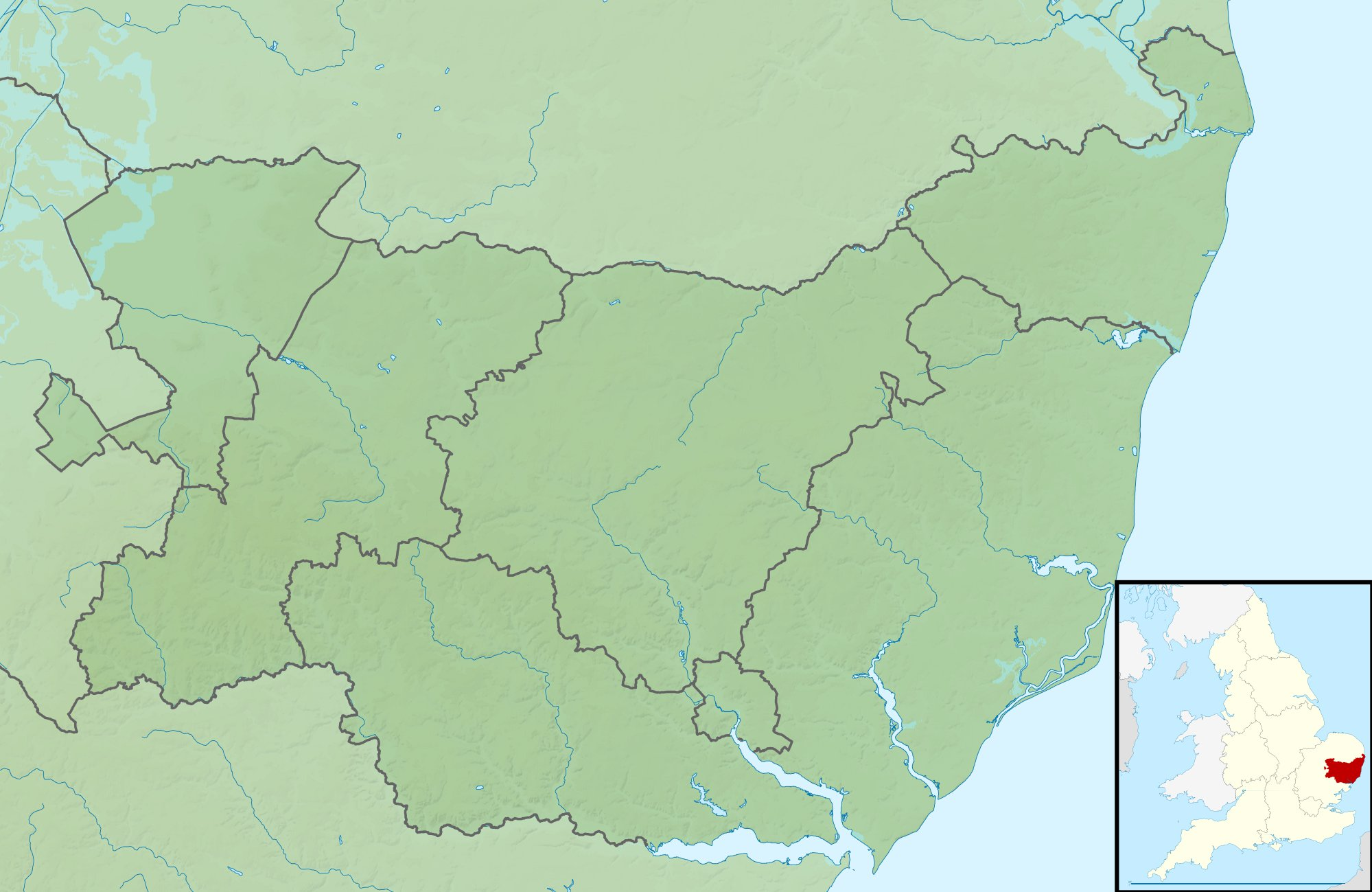
- Location within Suffolk Location within England
- Location: Lowestoft, Suffolk, England
- Coordinates: 52.474°N 1.734°E

Lake Lothing is a saltwater lake located in Lowestoft in the English county of Suffolk. The lake, which is believed to be the remnant of medieval peat cutting, flows into the North Sea and forms part of the Port of Lowestoft. The area was the major industrial centre of Lowestoft with ship building and other engineering industries, much of which has now closed.

The lake splits Lowestoft in two. It is bridged in the centre of town by a bascule bridge and in Oulton Broad by a vertical lift bridge and a rail swing bridge. Since September 2024, a new lifting road bridge, Lowestoft Gull Wing, is bridging the lake towards the middle. Mutford lock connects Lake Lothing to Oulton Broad from where access to the River Waveney and the Broads system is gained through Oulton Dyke.
