= River Waveney =

River in east England

Waveney
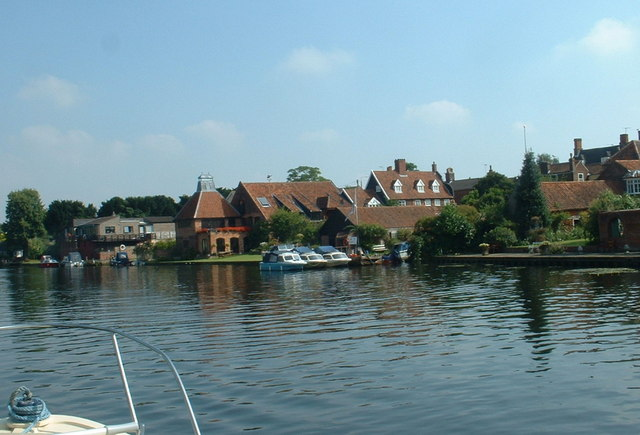
- The River at Beccles in Suffolk

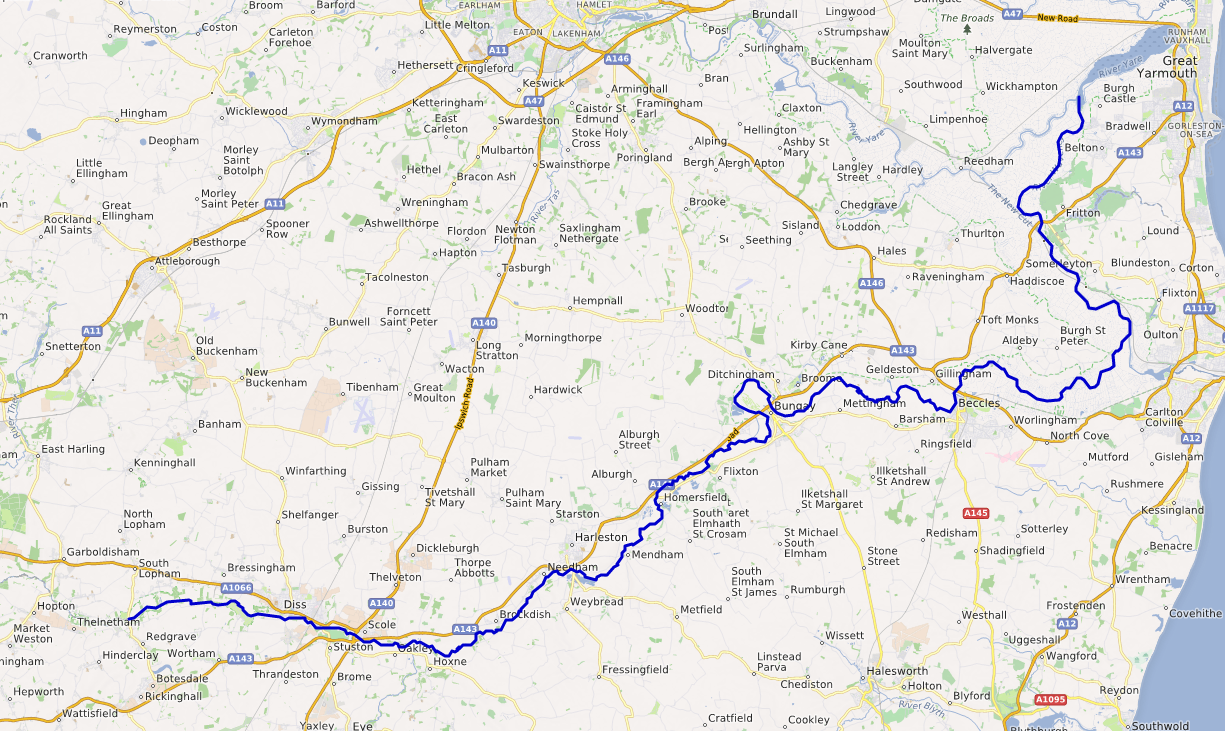
- Course of the Waveney.

Location
- Country: England
- Counties: Norfolk, Suffolk

Physical characteristics
- Source
  - location: near Redgrave, Suffolk
  - coordinates: 52.3712°N 0.9946°E
  - elevation: 25 m (82 ft)
- Mouth: Breydon Water
  - location: Great Yarmouth, Norfolk, UK
  - coordinates: 52.583°N 1.647°E
  - elevation: 0 m (0 ft)
- Length: 58.75 mi (94.55 km)
- Basin size: 339 sq mi (880 km^{2})

Basin features
- Tributaries
  - right: River Dove

The River Waveney is a river which forms the boundary between Suffolk and Norfolk, England, for much of its length within The Broads. The earliest attestation of the name is from 1275, Wahenhe, from *wagen + ea, meaning the river by a quagmire.

== Course ==
Redgrave and Lopham Fens, located between the villages of Redgrave, Suffolk and South Lopham, Norfolk is the largest area of spring-fed valley fen in lowland England. It covers an area of 432 acres (175 ha) and is a National nature reserve. The source of the River Waveney is a ditch on the east side of the B1113 road within the fens. The ditch on the other side of the road is the source of the River Little Ouse that continues the county boundary and, via the Great Ouse, reaches the sea at King's Lynn. It is thus claimed that during periods of heavy rainfall Norfolk can be considered to be an island. The explanation of this oddity is that the valley where the rivers rise was formed not by these rivers, but by water spilling from the periglacial lake known as Lake Fenland. This was a periglacial lake of the Devensian glacial period, fifteen or twenty thousand years ago. The ice sheet closed the natural drainage from the Vale of Pickering, the Humber and The Wash so that a lake of a complex shape formed in the Vale of Pickering, the Yorkshire Ouse valley, the lower Trent valley and the Fenland basin. This valley was its spillway into the southern North Sea basin, thence to the English Channel basin.

The river rises close to the 82-foot (25 m) contour, and flows in an easterly direction though the towns of Diss, Bungay and Beccles. From its source it forms the southern boundary of Bressingham and Roydon before it reaches Diss. At Scole it is crossed by the course of a Roman road, with the modern A140 bypass just to the east. There is a weir at Billingford and Billingford Windmill is situated a little to the north of the river. Beyond Billingford Bridge the River Dove, flowing northwards from Eye, joins on the southern bank, the Mid Suffolk Footpath crosses and the river drops below the 66-foot (20 m) contour at another weir. It turns to the north-east to reach Brockdish and Needham before passing to the south of Harleston. There are several lakes on the south bank, the largest covering 100 acres (40 ha), which were once Weybread Gravel Pits, but are now used for fishing.

Below the lakes are the remains of St Mary's Priory, Mendham, a Cluniac priory and the extensive drained area of Mendham Marshes. Mendham, which is the birthplace of the artist Alfred Munnings, lies on the Suffolk bank, Wortwell is in Norfolk, and Homersfield is again in Suffolk. In 1869, Homersfield Bridge, one of the first bridges to be constructed from concrete and iron was built across the river here. It was commissioned by Sir Shafto Adair, had a span of 50 feet (15 m) and predated the introduction of true reinforced concrete by several years. It is now the oldest concrete bridge in England and is a Grade II* listed structure. Road traffic was diverted onto a new bridge in 1970 and the former structure was acquired by Norfolk County Council in 1994. They passed it on to the Norfolk Historic Buildings Trust, which managed its restoration in 1995, which was funded by grants from English Heritage, Blue Circle Industries and councils at county, district and local level. Opposite Homersfield, on the Norfolk side of the river lie the parishes of Alburgh, Denton and Earsham. Next on the Suffolk bank is Flixton the site of a World War II USAF bomber base and the Norfolk and Suffolk Aviation Museum. At Earsham the Otter Trust had one of its three UK centres, which opened in 1978 and closed in 2006, having successfully boosted otter numbers on the river.

At Bungay, the historic head of navigation, the Waveney forms a wide oxbow meander, carrying with it the Norfolk/Suffolk border. Within this loop lies the long-established Bungay and Waveney Valley golf course. Next, on the Norfolk bank, come Ditchingham, Broome and Ellingham before Geldeston, where an isolated pub stands next to the site of a lock, now replaced by a sluice. This is the current limit of navigation for craft larger than a rowing or paddling boat and at this point the Waveney becomes a tidal river. A short way further along is a dyke that leads to the village. On the Suffolk side are found the parishes of Mettingham. Shipmeadow and Barsham. On the Norfolk side Gillingham comes next before the river gathers waters at Beccles, as it enters the Broads. Although the old town bridge here restricts navigation to craft with an air draft of less than 6 feet 6 inches (1.98 m), its quay beyond that abruptly changes the nature of the river from a gentle rural feature to a gateway to the North Sea. Beccles was a fishing port for many years and the parents of Lord Nelson were married in the church of St Michael. The river then meanders past Barnby Broad and Marshes SSSI and Burgh St Peter to Somerleyton. Here Oulton Dyke branches off the Waveney to Oulton Broad towards Lowestoft. A sea lock, known as Mutford Lock, divides fresh from seawater and links Oulton Broad with Lake Lothing and the North Sea. This lock is operated by Sentinel Enterprises Limited and will allow traffic to pass through.

At Somerleyton the Lowestoft to Norwich railway line crosses the Waveney on a swing bridge, while at St Olaves, the Haddiscoe Cut branches off left to connect the Rivers Yare and Waveney. The Cut was excavated in the 19th century to provide a direct route between Lowestoft Docks and Norwich. Finally the Waveney flows past Burgh Castle into Breydon Water at the confluence of the two rivers. The river Yare continues through Breydon Water to reach the sea at Great Yarmouth.

There was a special version of the Norfolk wherry in use on the Waveney, with boats measuring no more than 70 by 16 feet (21 by 5 m). There were also steam wherries.

Daniel Defoe enlivens this account of the Waveney's Broads course:

The River Waveney is a considerable river, and of a deep and full channel, navigable for large barges as high as Beccles; it runs for a course of about fifty miles, between the two counties of Suffolk and Norfolk, as a boundary to both; and pushing on, tho' with a gentle stream, towards the sea, no one would doubt, but, that when they see the river growing broader and deeper, and going directly towards the sea, even to the edge of the beach; that is to say, within a mile of the main ocean; no stranger, I say, but would expect to see its entrance into the sea at that place, and a noble harbour for ships at the mouth of it; when on a sudden, the land rising high by the sea-side, crosses the head of the river, like a dam, checks the whole course of it, and it returns, bending its course west, for two miles, or thereabouts; and then turning north, thro' another long course of meadows (joining to those just now mention'd) seeks out the River Yare, that it may join its water with hers, and find their way to the sea together. (Note: Defoe continues: "Some of our historians tell a long fabulous story of this river's being once open, and a famous harbour for ships belonging to the town of Leostof adjoining; But that the town of Yarmouth envying the prosperity of the said town of Leostof, made war upon them; and that after many bloody battles, as well by sea as by land, they came at last to a decisive action at sea with their respective fleets, and the victory fell to the Yarmouth men, the Leostof fleet being overthrown and utterly destroyed; and that upon this victory, the Yarmouth men either actually did stop up the mouth of the said river, or oblig'd the vanquished Leostof men to do it themselves, and bound them never to attempt to open it again. I believe my share of this story, and I recommend no more of it to the reader; adding, that I see no authority for the relation, neither do the relators agree either in the time of it, or in the particulars of the fact; that is to say, in whose reign, or under what government all this happened; in what year, and the like: So I satisfy my self with transcribing the matter of fact, and then leave it as I find it.")

== Navigation ==
The River Waverney was improved for navigation under an act of Parliament, the Rivers Brandon and Waveney Navigation Act 1670 (22 Cha. 2. c. 16 Pr.), obtained in 1670, which empowered five traders from Bungay and one from Downham Market to carry out the work. This included the construction of three locks, at Geldeston, Ellingham and Wainford, to extend navigation as far as Bungay Staithe. The navigation remained in private hands, and was not under the control of the Yarmouth Commissioners, who were responsible for the lower river. A second act of Parliament, the Great Yarmouth (Improvement) Act 1772 (12 Geo. 3. c. 14), ensured that Suffolk magistrates received a 5 per cent share of all tolls obtained from the carriage of coal, with which to maintain the Waveney. Ownership was in the hands of a merchant from Bungay at the end of the eighteenth century, and was later bought by William Butcher. When St Olave's bridge needed to be rebuilt in 1847, he explained that although he owned it, he had let out the collection of tolls, and such matters were dealt with by the judges at Bury St Edmunds Assizes. In 1848, he attempted to set up the Bungay Navigation Tontine Co., which would buy the rights to levy tolls and trade on the river, using a tontine, but the scheme failed to attract sufficient investors to become viable. In 1889 ownership was transferred to W. D. Walker of Bungay, a merchant and maltster. The firm was the first owner of a wherry called Albion, now owned by the Norfolk Wherry Trust. From 1919 to 1934, Watney, Combe, Reid and Co. controlled the navigation.

The short section of the river from Haddiscoe to Burgh Ferry was part of a grand scheme to link Norwich to the sea at Lowestoft. The scheme originated in 1818, but was opposed by the merchants of Yarmouth and it was not until 28 May 1827 that Norwich and Lowestoft Navigation Act 1827 (7 & 8 Geo. 4. c. xlii) authorised the Norwich and Lowestoft Navigation Company, giving then powers to raise £100,000, with an additional £50,000 if required. From Burgh Ferry, boats would use a widened Oulton Dyke to reach Oulton Broad and a new sea lock would be constructed to link the broad to Lake Lothing. This had four sets of gates, so that it could be used at all states of the tide, was capable of holding vessels which were 150 by 50 feet (46 by 15 m) and used a system of sluices to enable the channel through Lake Lothing to be flushed with water from Oulton Broad. Completed in 1829, it was demonstrated in 1831 and although four operations of the sluices were estimated to have removed 10,000 tons of gravel and shingle out to sea, its subsequent operation was not as effective.

In the other direction, construction of Haddiscoe Cut began, to link the river at Haddiscoe to the River Yare at Reedham, enabling vessels from Norwich to bypass Yarmouth. With funds running low, a decision was taken to borrow the additional £50,000 which the enabling act allowed and so a request was made to the Exchequer Bill Loan Commission for this amount. Work was completed on the cut and the upgrading of the river to Norwich and the formal opening took place on 30 September 1833. The venture was a commercial failure, as development of Norwich as a port did not occur and Lowestoft harbour was subject to silting. With income failing to match expenditure, the Exchequer Bill Loan Commission could not be repaid, so they took over the navigation in 1842 and sold it to the railway contractor Sir Samuel Morton Peto.

With the decline in the use of wherries for commercial trade on the rivers prior to the Second World War, navigation ceased on several stretches of the Broads, including the 4.2-mile (6.8 km) section of the river from Geldeston Lock to Bungay, where navigation rights were removed by the River Waveney (Extinguishment of Navigation Rights) Order 1934 (SR&O 1934/673). Geldeston Lock, which is also known as Shipmeadow Lock, gradually deteriorated, and in 2013 it was restored in a joint project by the River Waveney Trust and the Inland Waterways Association. During the restoration work, a carved stone showing that the lock was previously restored in 1910 was found, as was a gold wedding ring. Wainford and Ellingham locks have since been converted into sluices, but the Environment Agency has negotiated with local landowners to allow the use of this section by canoes and unpowered craft. To aid this, it has improved the facilities for portaging boats at the locks.

Mutford lock links Oulton Broad to Lake Lothing and is the only working lock on the whole of the Broads. Two swing bridges carried the Lowestoft to Ipswich railway line and the A1117 road over the cut to the east of the lock. The road bridge has since been replaced with a single leaf bascule bridge in August 1992. The lock was refurbished in 1992 and was managed by Waveney District Council, but there were discussions taking place in 2009 to transfer it to the Broads Authority, who manage the rest of the Broads. Since 2011, day-to-day management has been handled on behalf of the council by Sentinel Enterprises, which is part of Sentinel Leisure Trust. They also operate Oulton Broad Yacht Station.

== Milling ==
In common with most of the rivers of Suffolk and Norfolk, the Waveney is relatively flat, falling around 67 feet (20 m) on the section between Hoxne Mill, near to its junction with the River Dove, and Beccles Bridge, where the river is tidal. These points are 25 miles (40 km) apart, giving an average fall of 1 in 1,970. Despite these factors, the river has powered at least 15 mills, evidence for some of which indicates that the river has been used for this purpose for over 900 years. Most milled corn for flour or animal feed, but some were used for other purposes. Of those that remain, all are in private ownership.

The mill furthest upstream was Scole Flax Mill, although it was not a watermill, being powered by steam. It was built by C.F. Costerton in 1854, in an attempt to alleviate poverty during the agricultural depressions of the 1840s, which followed the cessation of war with France. He persuaded farmers to grow flax, and provided the facilities to process it, both at the mill and at a factory in Eye run by his business partner Peter Naylor. The flax was grown for its fibres, which were used to make linen sheeting, sacking and rope, and for its seeds, from which linseed oil was obtained. Production was encouraged by presenting a cup each year to the farmer who had produced the highest yield on 3 acres (1.2 ha) of land. With the mill affected by a decline in local supplies and overseas competition, it closed in 1881, after which the machinery was removed and the buildings demolished.

The first watermill was at Hoxne. The present building was erected in 1846, and consists of a brick ground floor, with two storeys above that which are timber framed and weatherboarded, and a slate roof. It replaced a structure built in 1749, but that was not the first mill at Hoxne, since a mill is shown on Kirby's map of Suffolk, dated 1736, and two mills are mentioned in the Domesday Book of 1086, although this probably meant that there were two sets of stones. The last two buildings were variously used for milling corn, the production of textiles, and for processing flax at different points in their history. The mill ceased to be used after it was sold in 1968, but retains its wheel and some of the machinery. Both the mill and the adjacent house are grade II listed structures.

Syleham Mill is first mentioned in connection with some monks from near Thetford, who founded a monastery in 1020. The final structure to occupy the site was built some time after 1779. Initially it had six sets of stones and two wheels, powered by a 6-foot (1.8 m) fall in the river, but in 1849, Henry Warne moved his business from Hoxne Mill to Syleham, and used the mill to power looms on which a coarse cloth made from linen and cotton called drabbet was woven. 96 people were employed there in 1855, but although manufacture of drabbet ceased in 1914, the adjacent factory continued to be used for the making of clothing. The mill and part of the factory were destroyed by fire in 1928, but the factory was rebuilt, and continued to produce men's garments until 1989, when it was closed with the loss of 100 jobs. The next mill was Luck's Mill, about which very little is known, but it was shown on Kirby's map of 1736, and was demolished in the 1880s or 1890s.

Needham Mill also had ecclesiastical connections, as it was owned by Sibson Abbey, a Cistercian abbey founded in 1150. It was sold in 1611, and appears on Kirby's map of 1736. Although known as Needham Mill, it is on the Suffolk side of the river, in the parish of Weybread. Milling continued until 1934, when the mill was sold. The ironwork and wheel were sold for scrap in 1940, and it was converted into a house in 1971. The weir and sluice were rebuilt in 1963 at a cost of £12,714. The work created a gauging station for flow measurement, and increased the capacity of the channels to reduce the risk of flooding. Weybread mill is also noted in the Domesday survey. Both Needham and Weybread were run by William Mann in 1779, and Weybread mill was run by a miller and baker called Jacob Stanton from 1785. He became bankrupt in 1794, and the sale details indicate that there were two wheels driving five pairs of stones, and a newly invented water-powered engine for cutting hay and straw. Details from its sale in 1918 indicate that one wheel was 20 feet (6.1 m) in diameter by 12 feet (3.7 m) wide, making it the biggest wheel on the Waveney, while the other was 16 feet (4.9 m) in diameter. It had five storeys, and sold for £1,250, but burnt down two years later and was not rebuilt.

Mendham had a mill in 1086, although the present building was constructed in 1807, and was extended in 1871, when a 25 hp (19 kW) grasshopper beam engine was installed to supplement the water wheel, which only had a fall of 3 feet 6 inches (1.1 m), when water levels were low. The machinery was modernised in 1905, when the number of stones was reduced from nine to four, to make way for a roller plant. The beam engine was replaced in 1923, having been driven and maintained for over 50 years by Jimmy Souter. During this time it never broke down, and Souter died once it was dismantled. It was replaced by a Lister diesel engine, and then a Ruston and Hornsby engine. Part of the building was converted into a house in 1938, and the mill continued to operate until 1949. The rights to use the water were given up in the 1950s, in exchange for the provision of mains electricity to the premises. Both the mill and the house are grade II listed. There may also have been a paper mill at Mendham, but the evidence is inconclusive.

Limbourne Mill in Wortwell is mentioned in the Domesday Book, and was owned by the Benedictine Nunnery at Bungay. It appears in documents from 1334, 1356 and 1364, and in 1846 it was noted in a history of Suffolk that Limbourne would be unknown were it not for the water mill, which was called Limber Mill at the time. It continued in use until at least 1933, but was unused by 1949. Some of the original machinery survives, and the mill is grade II listed. Homersfield Mill is attested in 1086 and by documents from every century from the fourteenth onwards. The river bank by the weir collapsed in the early 1920s, and was not repaired, resulting in the mill and cottage deteriorating and being demolished in 1927.

== Water quality ==
The Environment Agency measures the water quality of the river systems in England. Each is given an overall ecological status, which may be one of five levels: high, good, moderate, poor and bad. There are several components that are used to determine this, including biological status, which looks at the quantity and varieties of invertebrates, angiosperms and fish. Chemical status, which compares the concentrations of various chemicals against known safe concentrations, is rated good or fail.

The water quality of the River Waveney system was as follows in 2019.

Section	Ecological Status	Chemical Status	Length	Catchment	Channel
Tributary of Upper Waveney	Moderate	Fail	3.5 miles (5.6 km)	8.29 square miles (21.5 km^{2})	
Waveney (u/s Frenze Beck)	Moderate	Fail	6.5 miles (10.5 km)	17.24 square miles (44.7 km^{2})	
Frenze Beck	Moderate	Fail	7.3 miles (11.7 km)	14.51 square miles (37.6 km^{2})	
Waveney (Frenze Beck to Dove)	Moderate	Fail	3.5 miles (5.6 km)	5.08 square miles (13.2 km^{2})	
Tributary of Waveney	Moderate	Fail	11.0 miles (17.7 km)	18.58 square miles (48.1 km^{2})	
Metfield Stream	Moderate	Fail	4.3 miles (6.9 km)	4.55 square miles (11.8 km^{2})	heavily modified
The Beck	Moderate	Fail	3.3 miles (5.3 km)	15.09 square miles (39.1 km^{2})	
Waveney (R Dove - Starston Brook)	Moderate	Fail	12.0 miles (19.3 km)	17.82 square miles (46.2 km^{2})	heavily modified
Starston Brook	Moderate	Fail	5.0 miles (8.0 km)	6.74 square miles (17.5 km^{2})	
Broome Beck	Moderate	Fail	8.1 miles (13.0 km)	18.38 square miles (47.6 km^{2})	heavily modified
Waveney (Starston Brook - Ellingham Mill)	Moderate	Fail	12.9 miles (20.8 km)	24.08 square miles (62.4 km^{2})	heavily modified
Waveney (Ellingham Mill - Burgh St. Peter)	Moderate	Fail	12.6 miles (20.3 km)	46.38 square miles (120.1 km^{2})	heavily modified
Bure & Waveney & Yare & Lothing	Moderate	Fail			heavily modified

The reasons for the quality being less than good include sewage discharge affecting most of the river, physical modification of channels, and poor management of agricultural and rural land adjacent to the river system. Like most rivers in the UK, the chemical status changed from good to fail in 2019, due to the presence of polybrominated diphenyl ethers (PBDEs), which had not previously been included in the assessment.

== Location ==
Point	Coordinates (Links to map resources)	OS Grid Ref	Notes
Source	52.371°N 0.994°E	TM039789	
Homersfield	52.421°N 1.357°E	TM283856	Concrete bridge
Bungay	52.456°N 1.445°E	TM341898	Old head of navigation
Geldeston	52.466°N 1.522°E	TM393911	Current head of navigation
Beccles	52.465°N 1.561°E	TM420912	
Jn with Oulton Dyke	52.490°N 1.682°E	TM500943	to Lowestoft harbour
Jn with Haddiscoe Cut	52.532°N 1.620°E	TM456989	to River Yare
Jn with Breydon Water	52.583°N 1.647°E	TG471046	Mouth

== See also ==
- Rivers of the United Kingdom

== Gallery of crossings ==
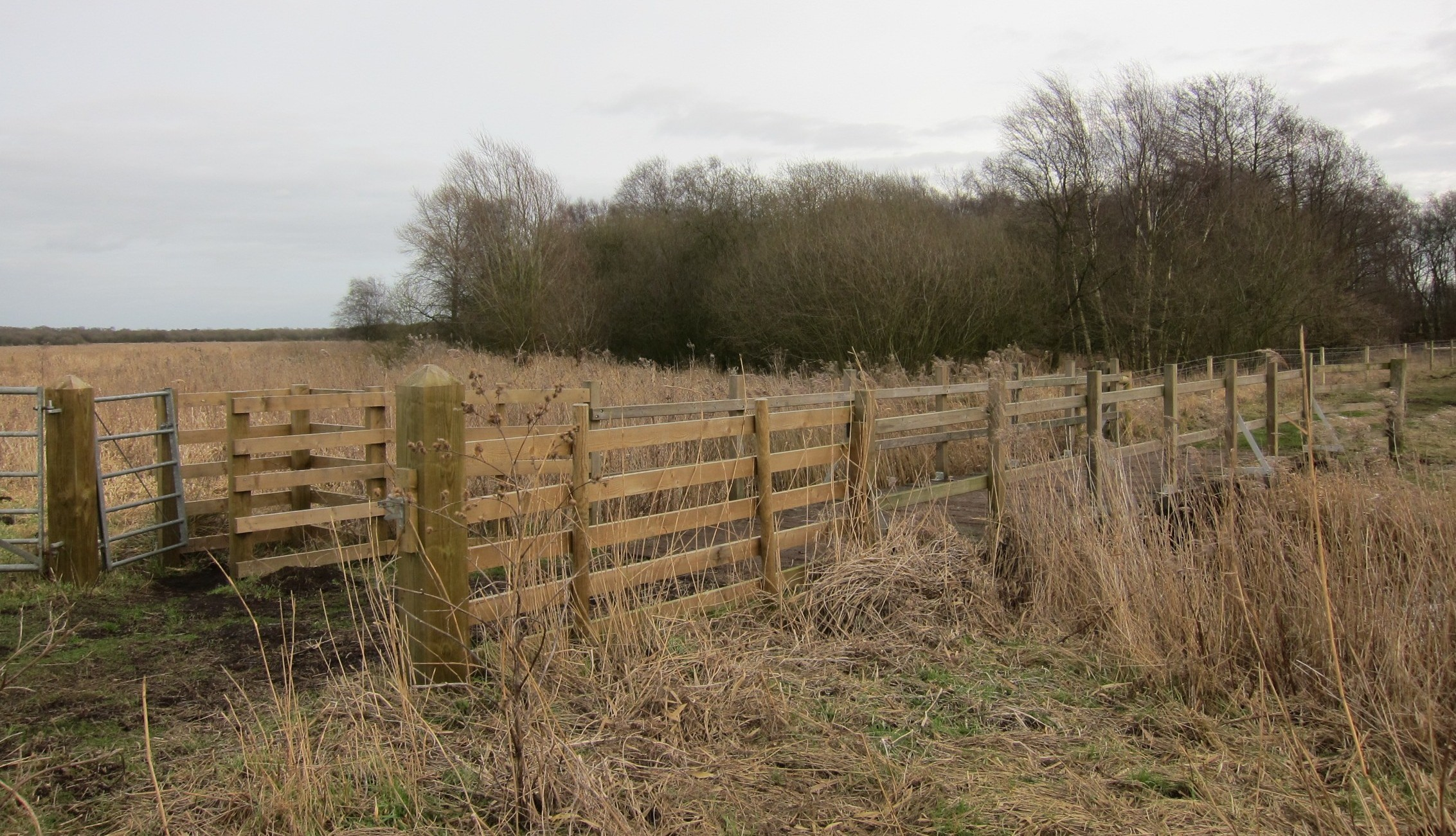
First crossing, at source, Redgrave & S. Lopham Fen

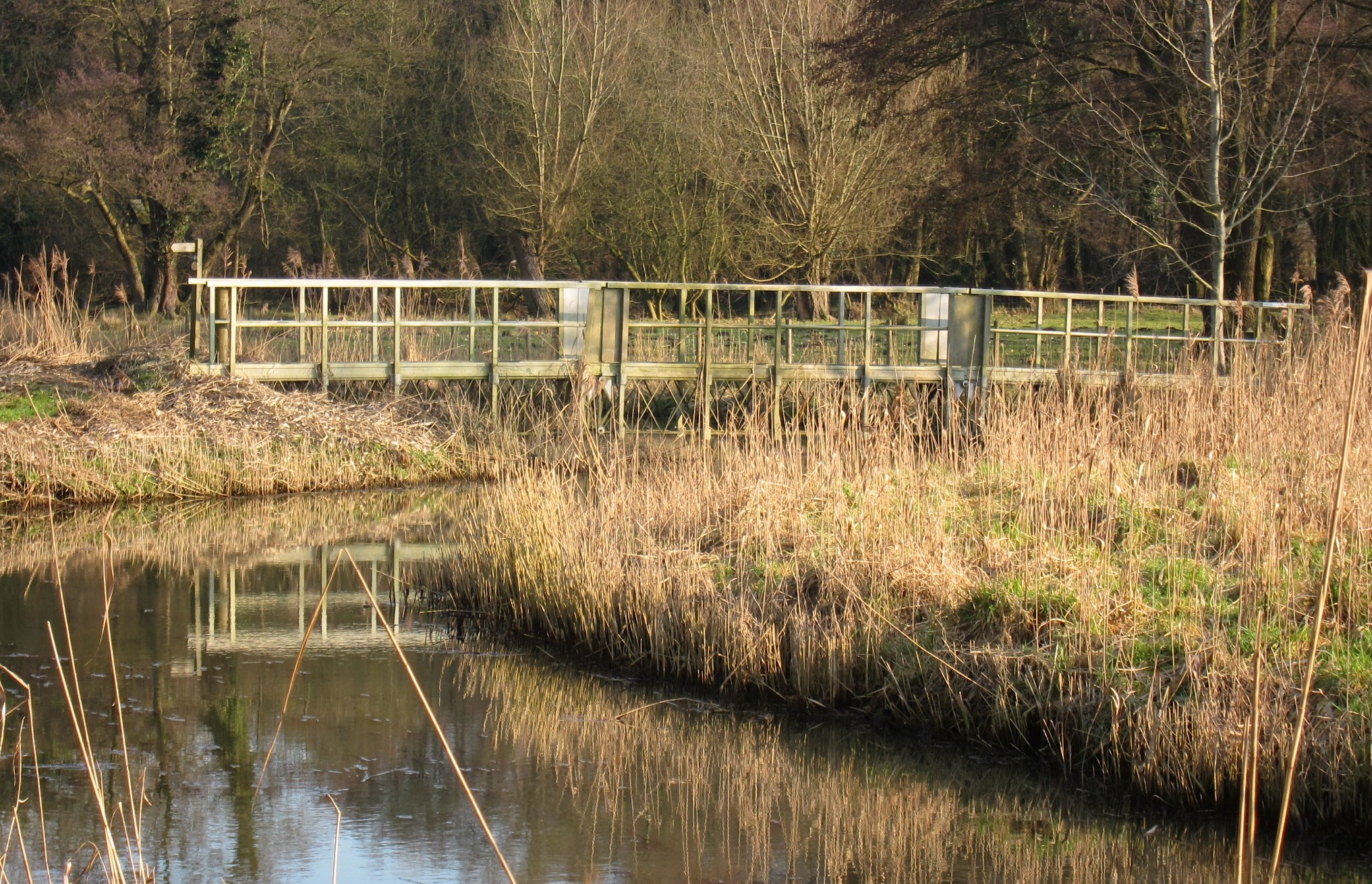
Second crossing, as channel forms, Redgrave Fen

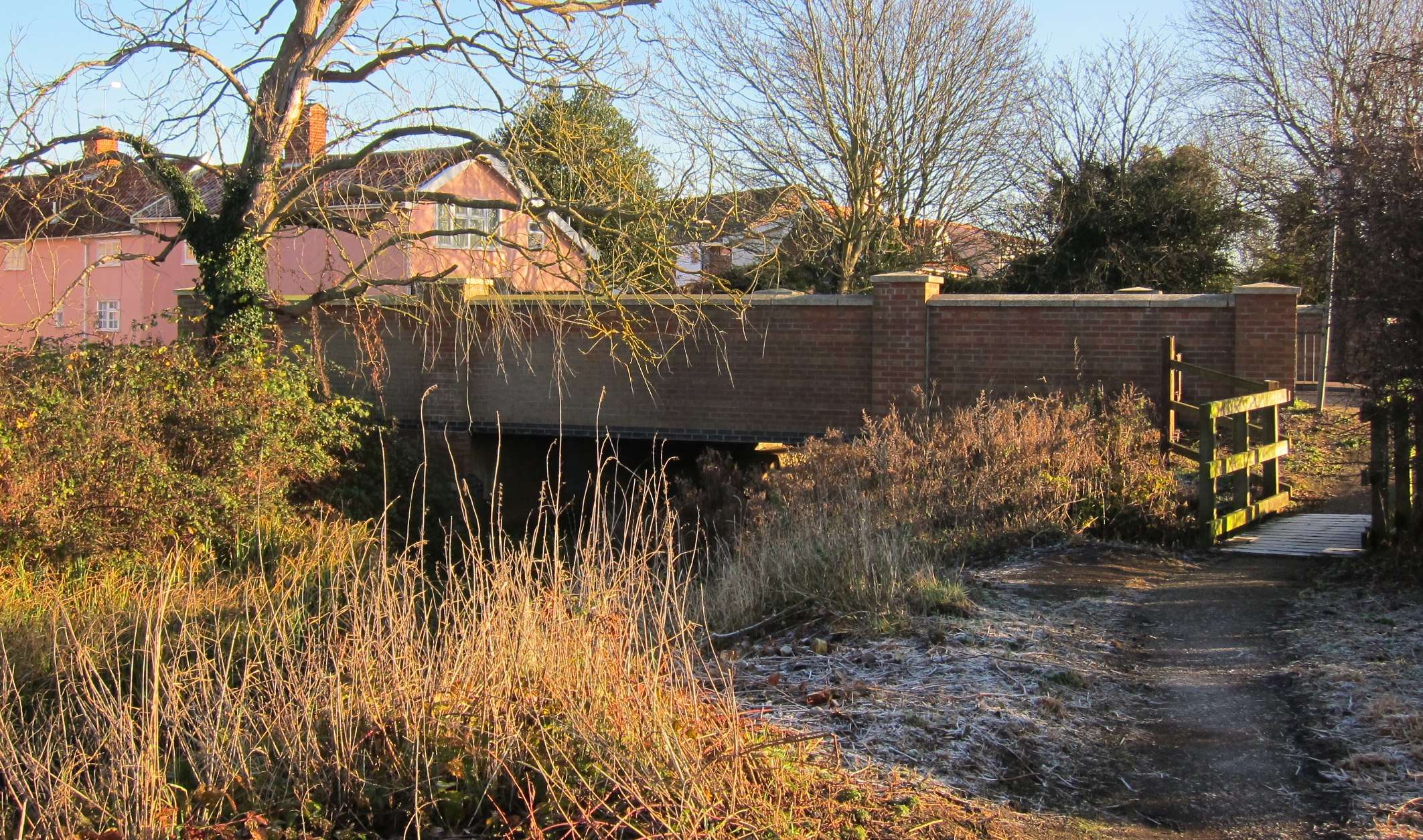
Denmark Bridge, Diss

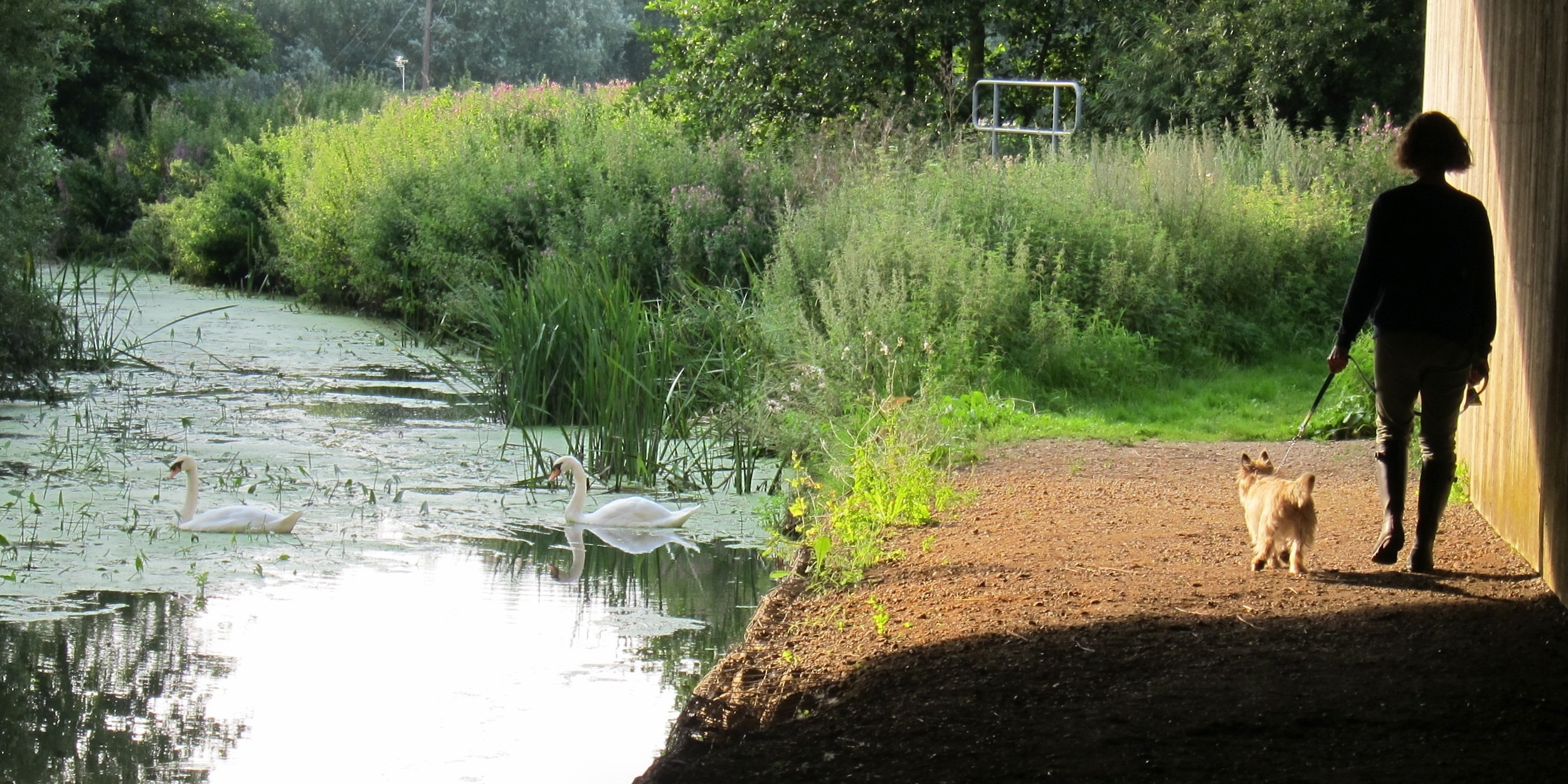
Pair of swans nr walking path under A140 bridge

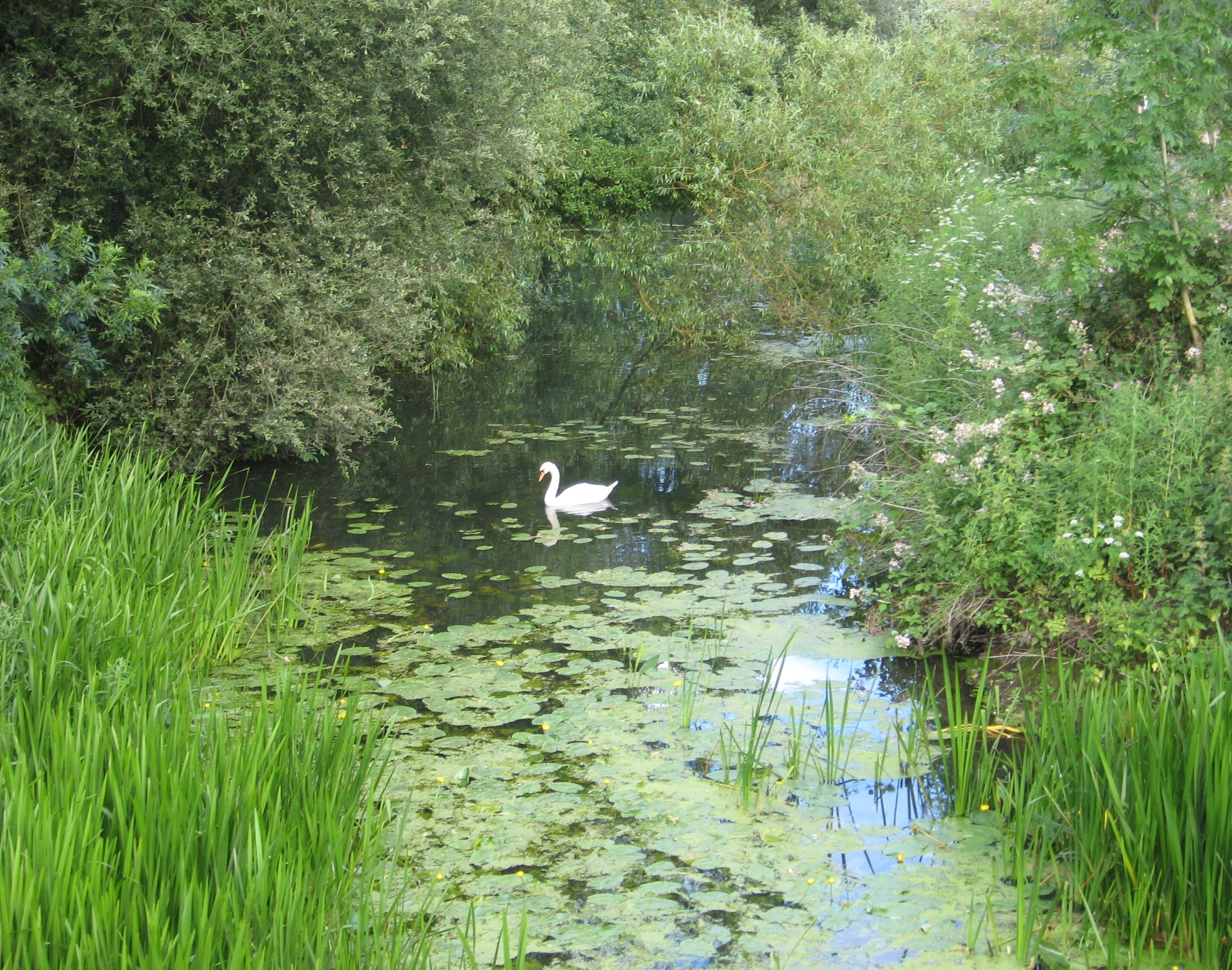
View of Waveney nr Roman road: Scole Bridge towards A143

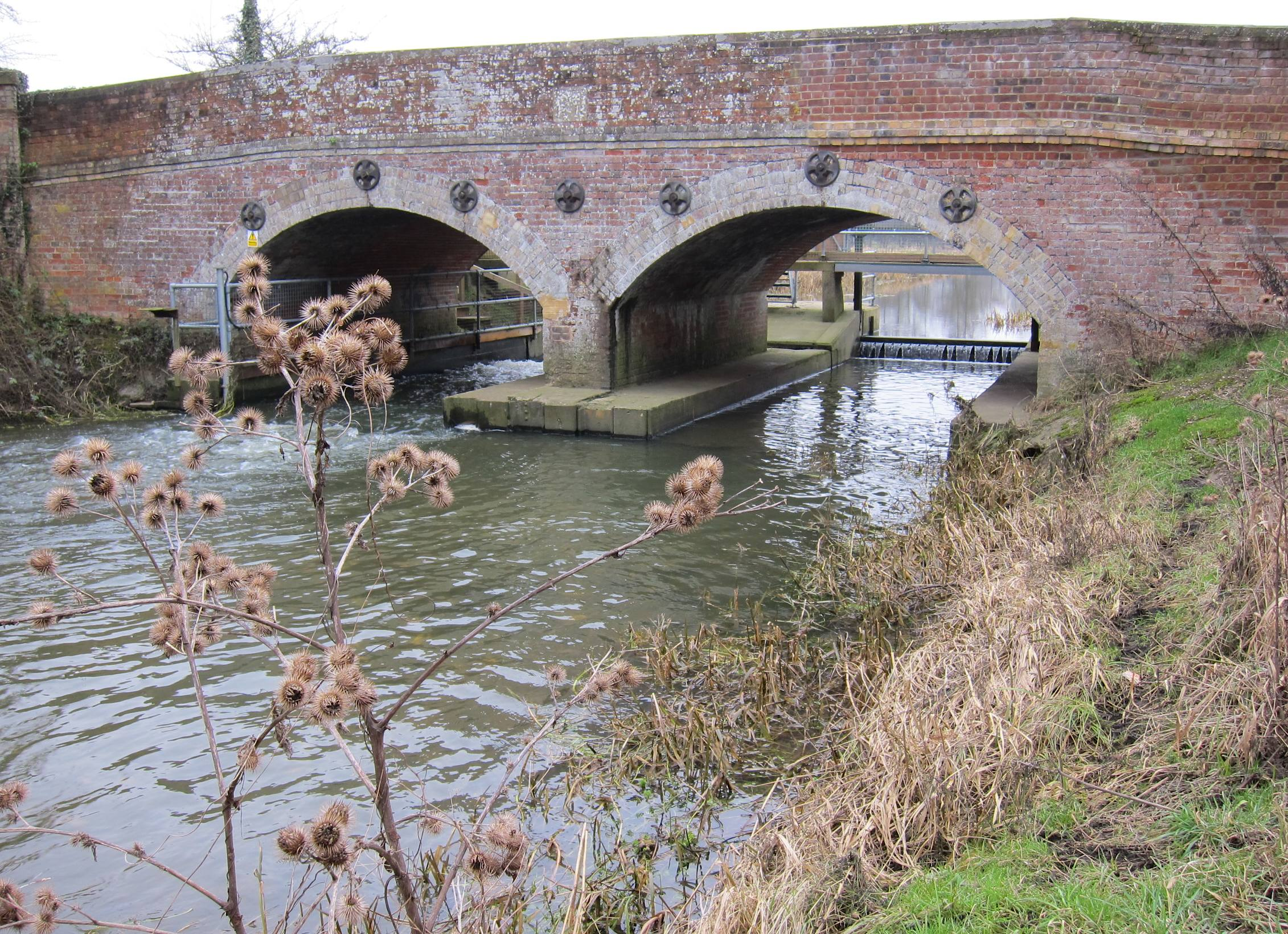
Billingford Bridge & weir, January 2011

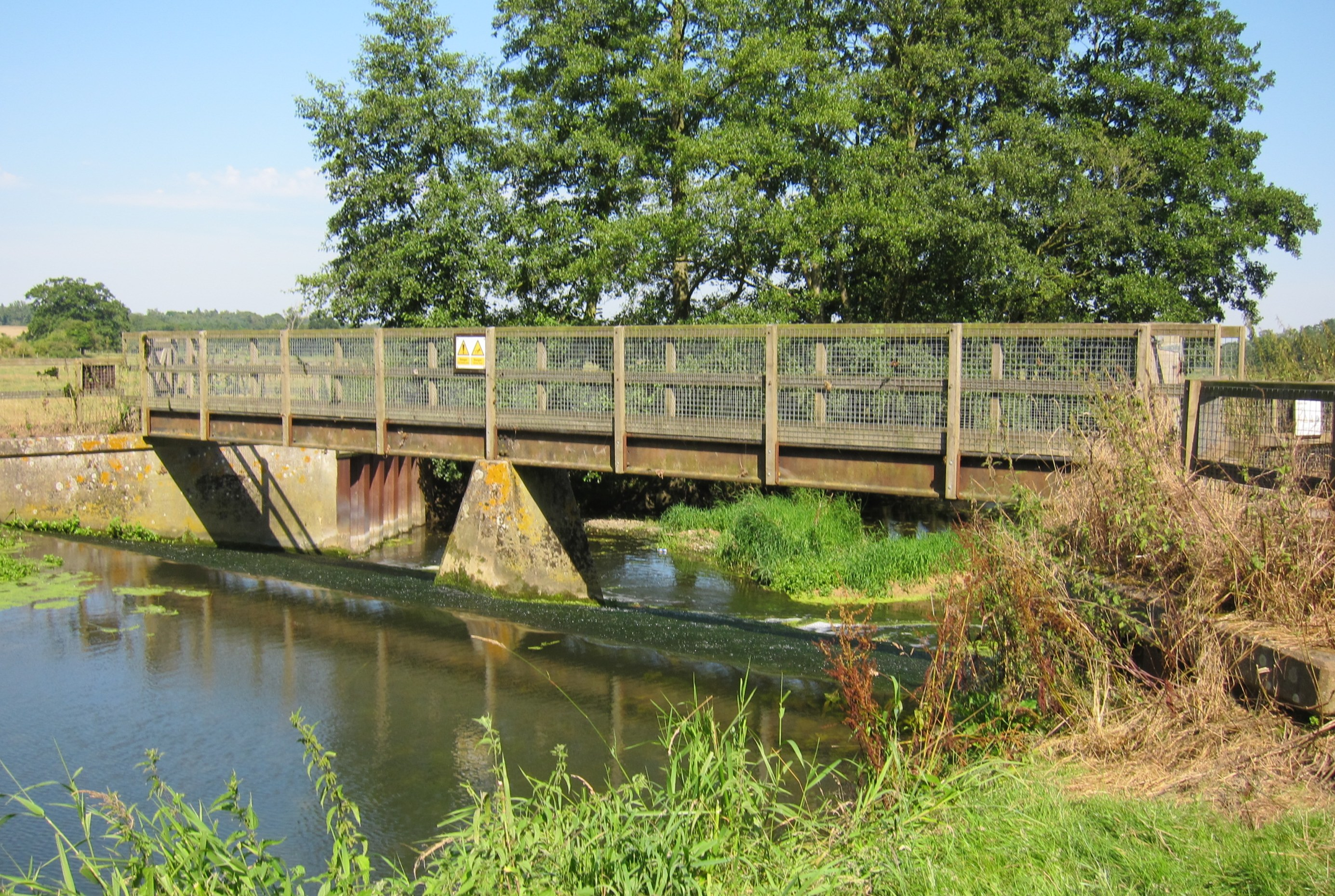
Hoxne weir footbridge

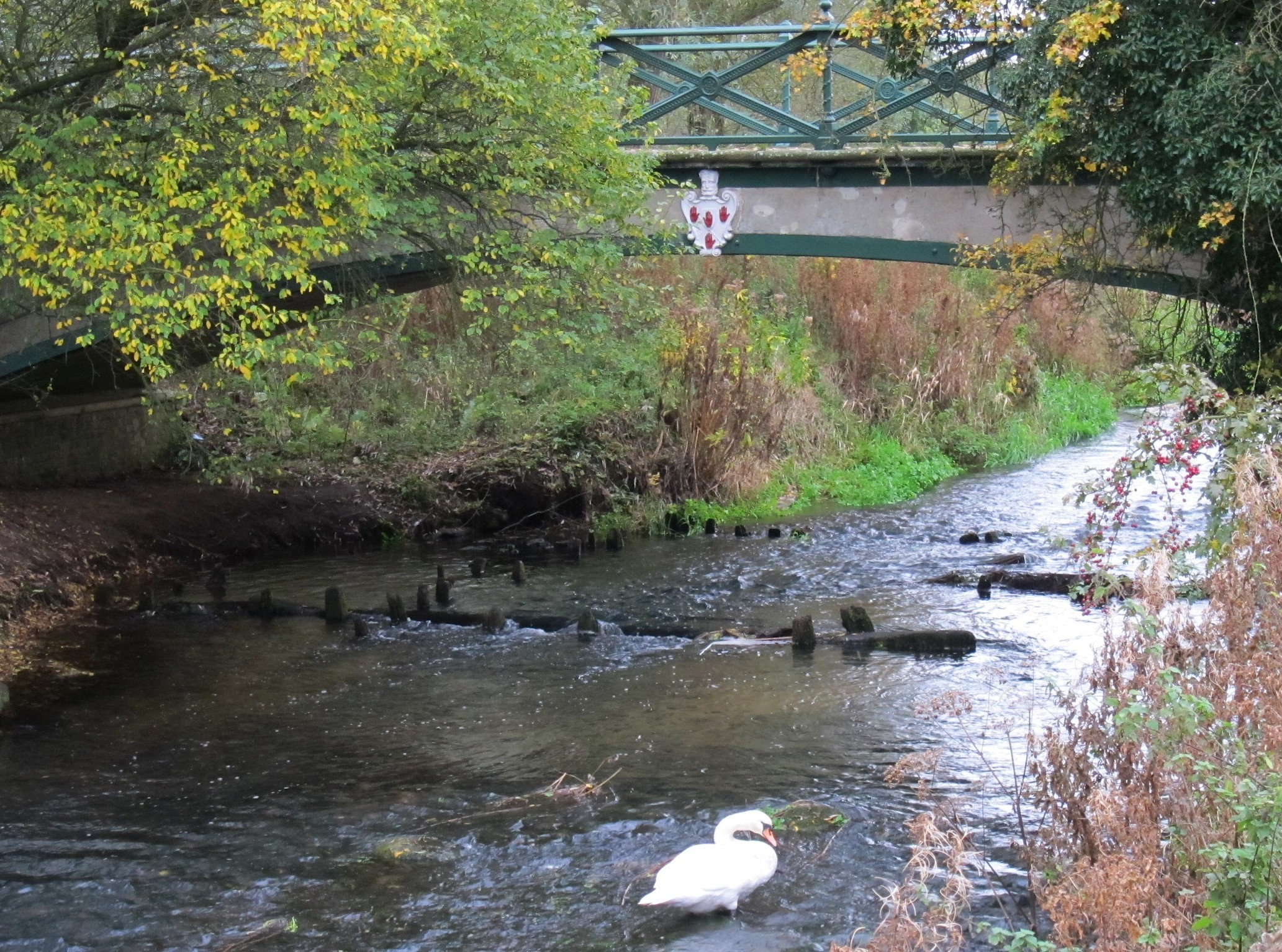
Homersfield Bridge: oldest concrete bridge in Great Britain

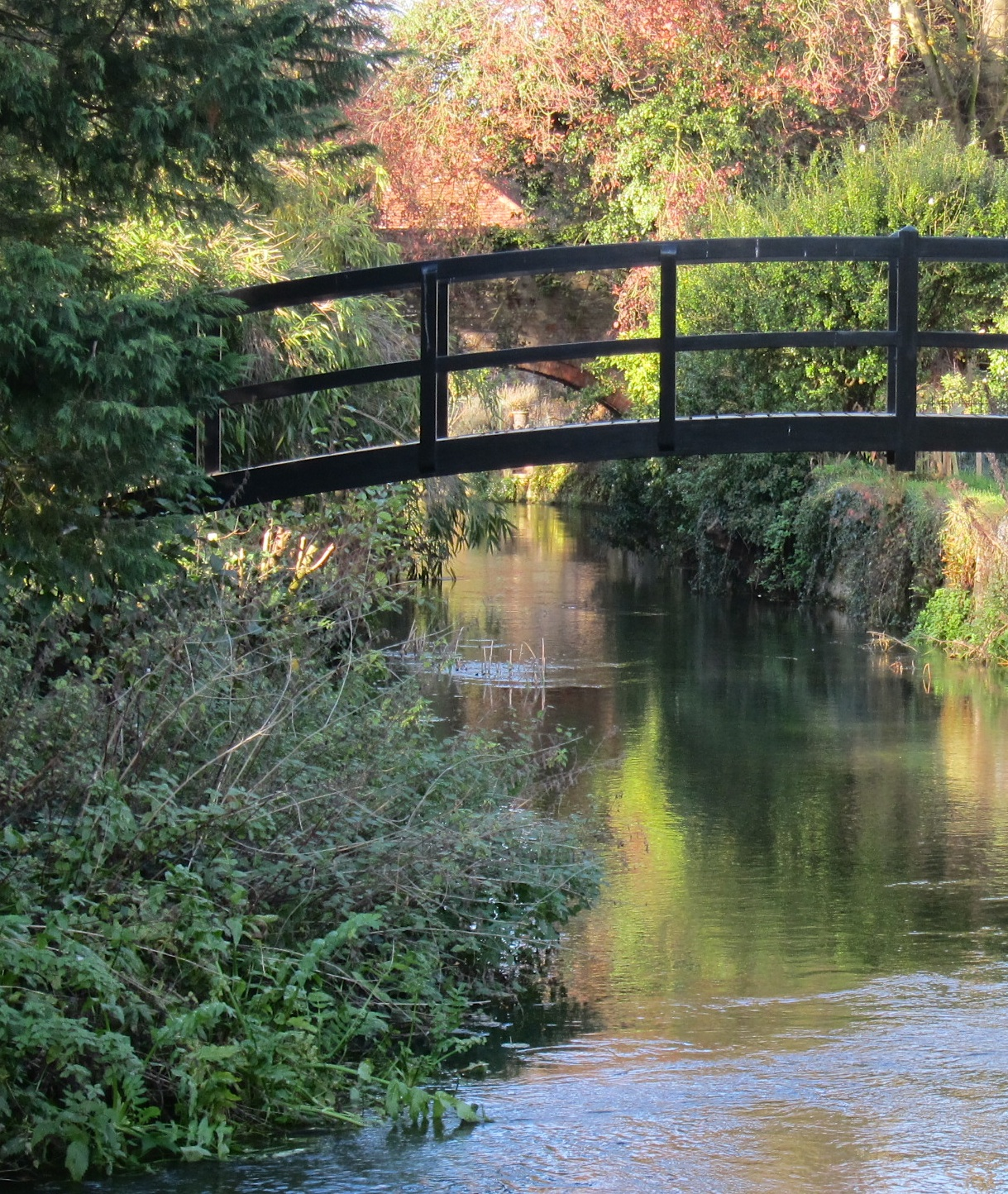
Bungay: Earsham St bridge, (beyond private footbridge)

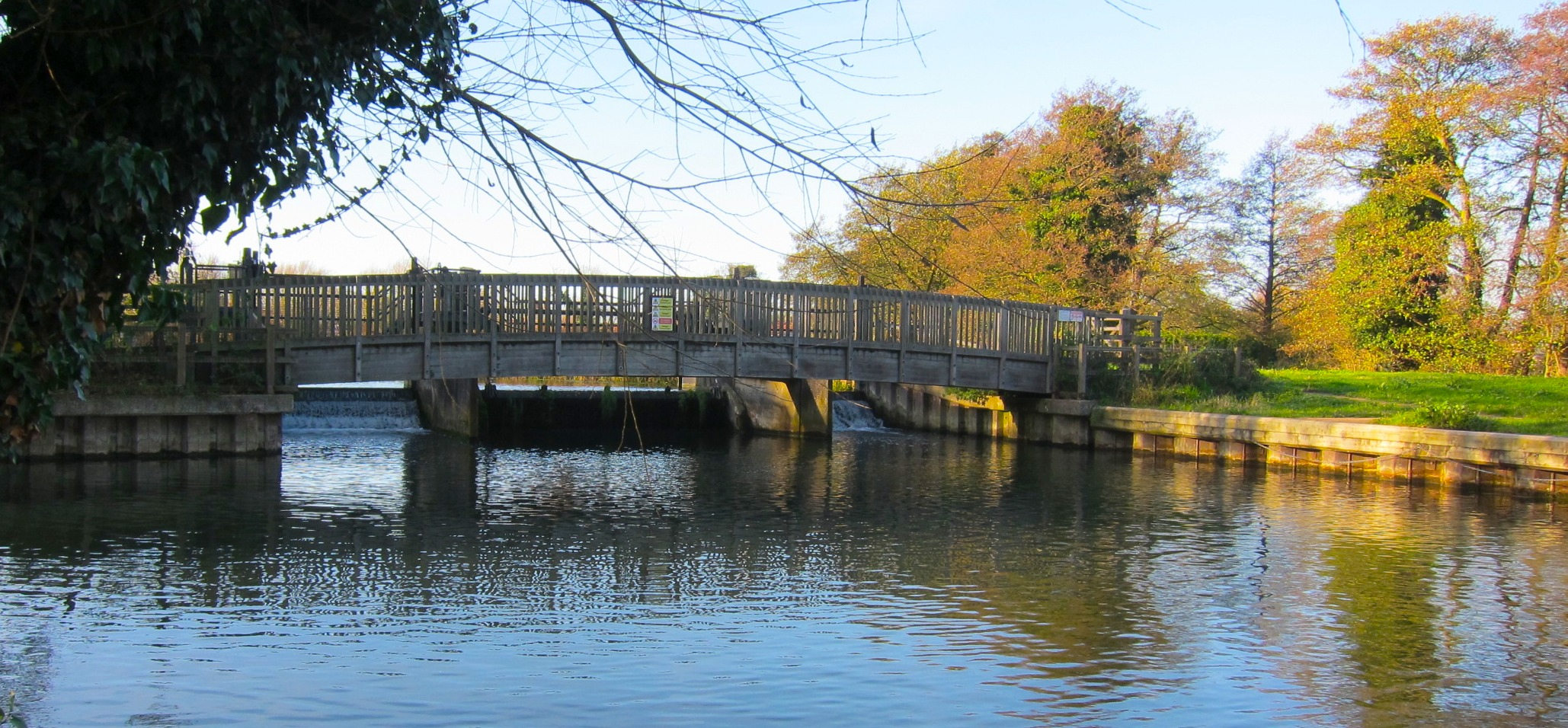
Staithe weir gates and footbridge, Bungay

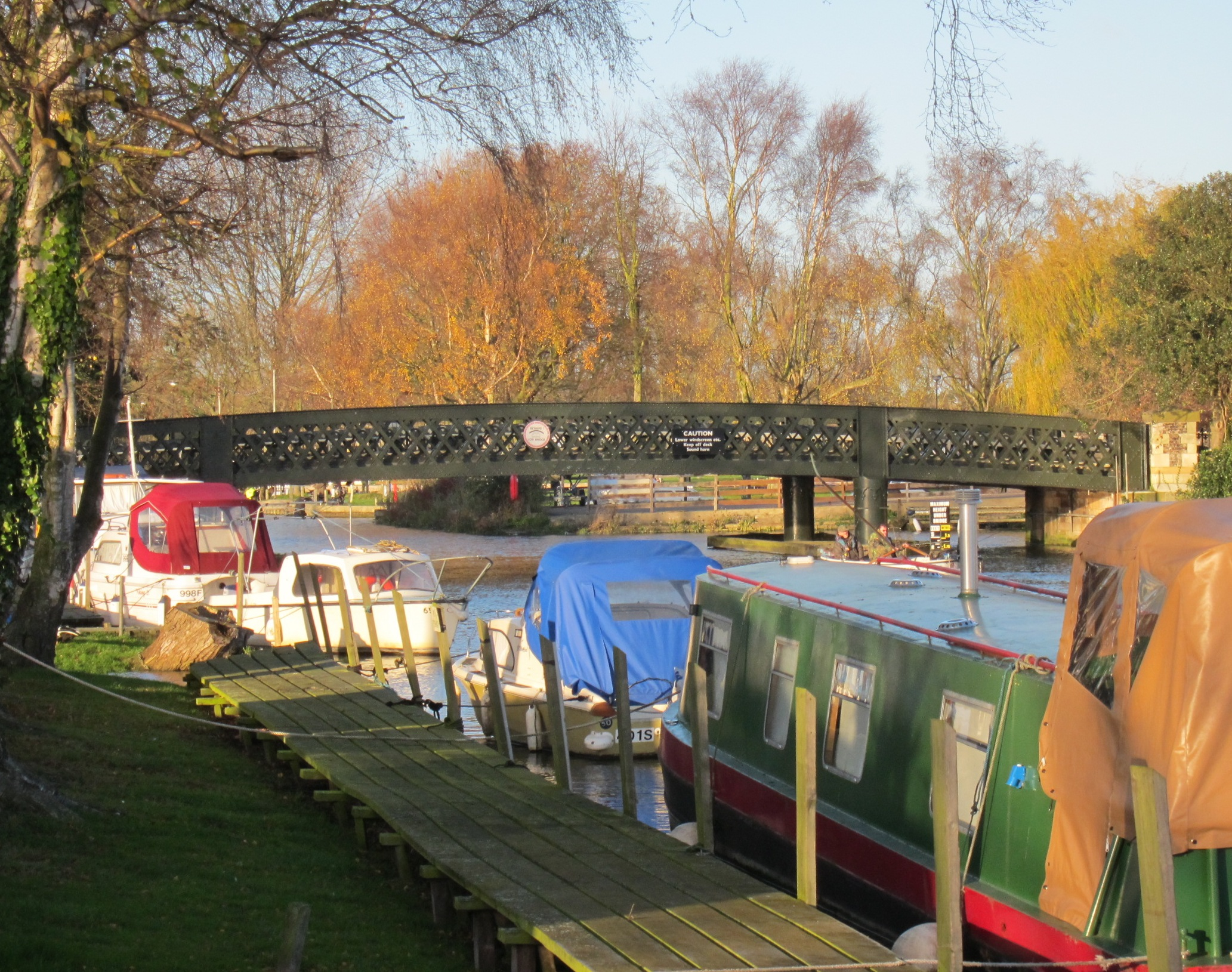
Beccles: upstream view of Bridge St bridge, showing height limit

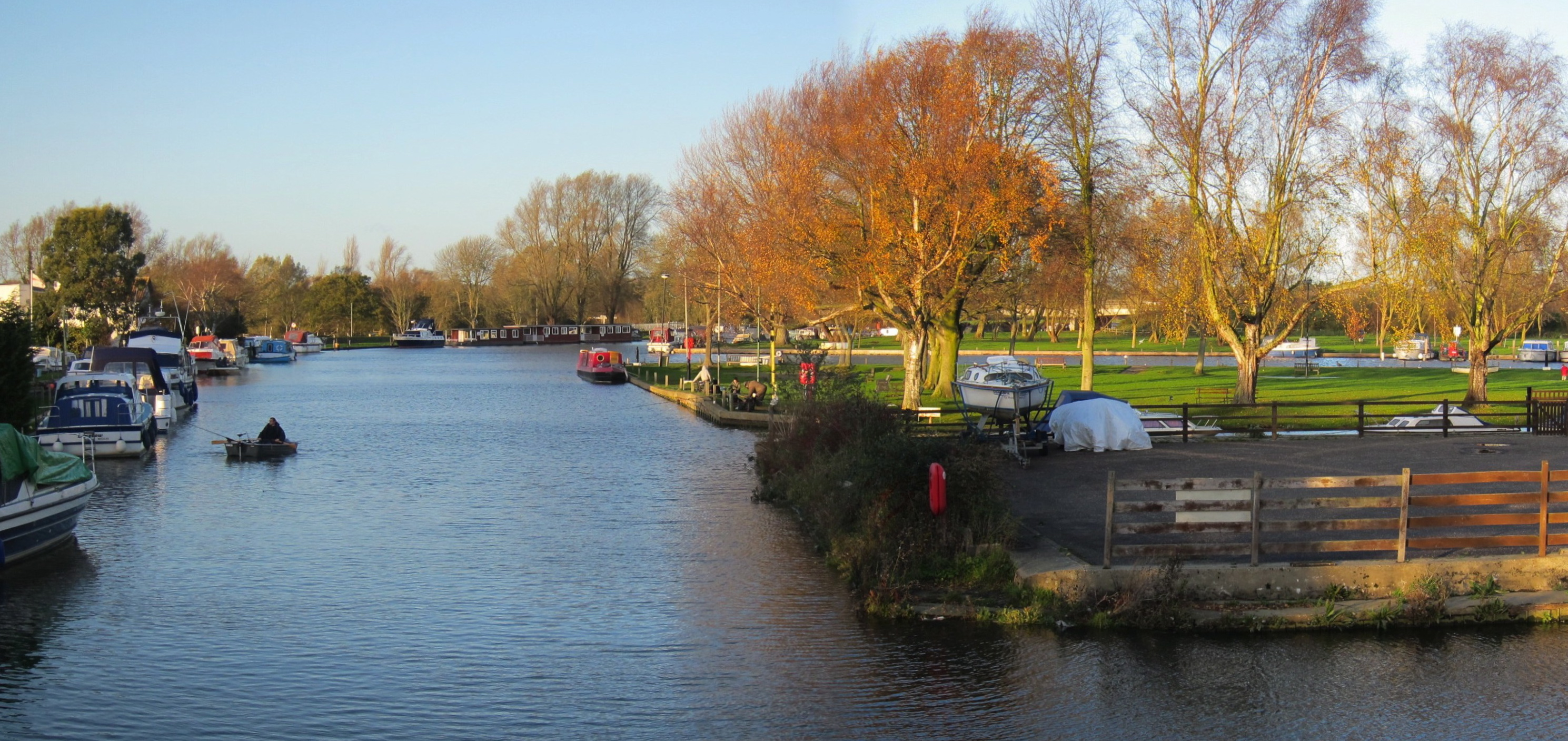
Beccles quay: downstream view from Bridge St bridge
