= Haddiscoe =

Village in Norfolk, England

Coordinates: 52.514°N 1.595°E

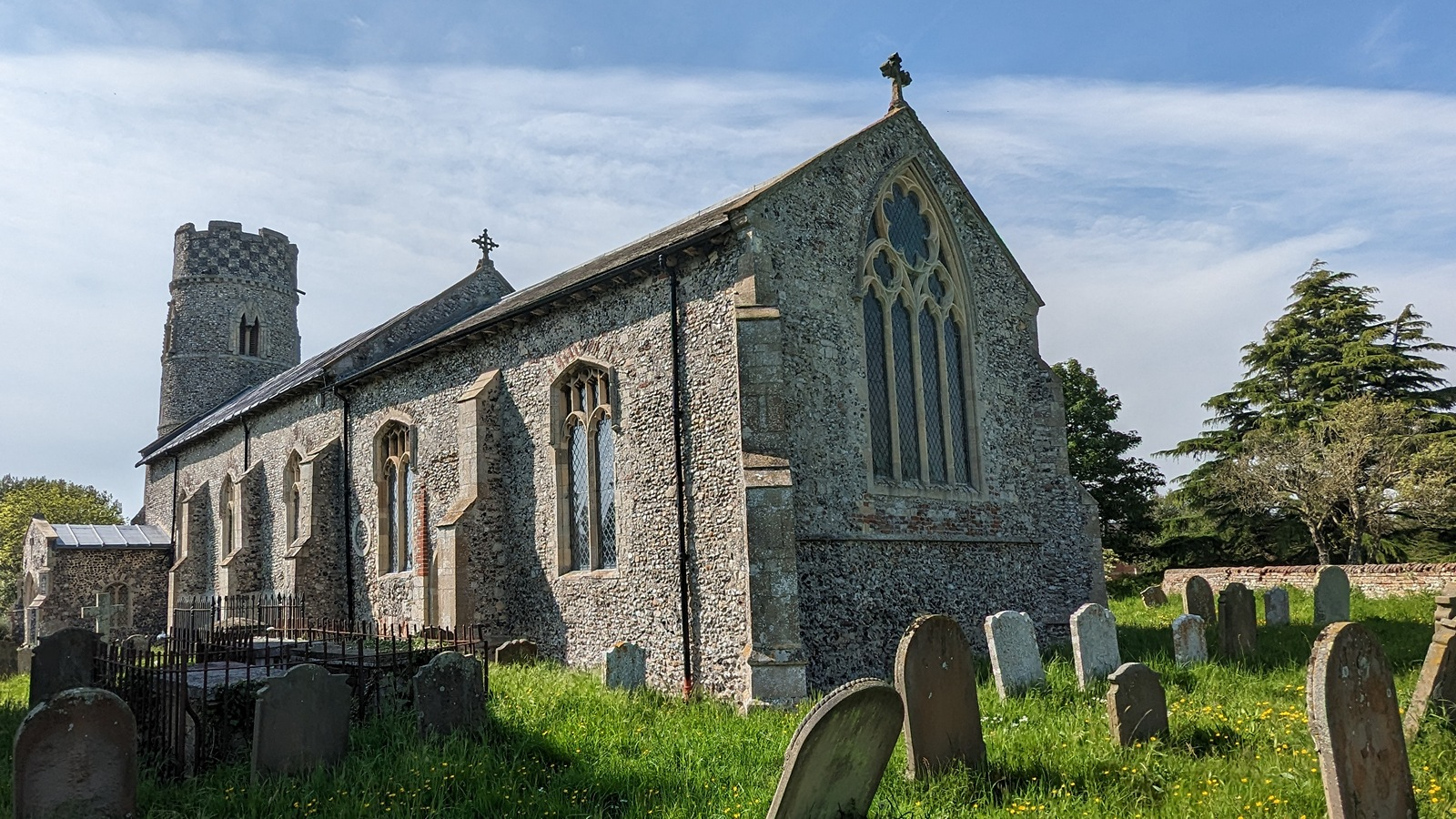
- St Mary's Church

- Location within Norfolk
- Area: 7.67 sq mi (19.9 km^{2})
- Population: 459 (2021 census)
  - Density: 60/sq mi (23/km^{2})
- OS grid reference: TM440968
- Civil parish: Haddiscoe
- District: South Norfolk
- Shire county: Norfolk
- Region: East
- Country: England
- Sovereign state: United Kingdom
- Post town: Norwich
- Postcode district: NR14
- Dialling code: 01502
- Police: Norfolk
- Fire: Norfolk
- Ambulance: East of England
- UK Parliament: South Norfolk
- Website: Parish Council

Haddiscoe is a village and civil parish in the South Norfolk district of the English county of Norfolk. The parish also includes the small hamlet of Thorpe-next-Haddiscoe.

Haddiscoe is located 7 miles (11 km) north-west of Lowestoft and 16 miles (26 km) south-east of Norwich.

== History ==
Haddiscoe's name is of Viking origin and derives from the Old Norse for Haddr's wood.

In the Domesday Book, Haddiscoe is listed as a settlement of 70 households in the hundred of Clavering. In 1086, the village was divided between the estates of King William I, Roger Bigod, Ralph Baynard and Robert, son of Corbucion.

The only preceptory of the Knights Templar in Norfolk stood in the parish from 1218 to 1312, though the precise site of the building is unknown.

In 1827, the Haddiscoe Cut was dug through the parish to provide a more navigable water route from the River Yare to the North Sea.

Haddiscoe Railway Station opened in 1904 and still operates as a stop on the Lowestoft section of the Wherry Line. The station was preceded by an older Haddiscoe Railway Station which sat on the Norfolk Railway between 1847 and 1904.

Norfolk's only remaining First World War pillbox stands in the village.

== Geography ==
According to the 2021 census, Haddiscoe has a total population of 459 people which demonstrates a decrease from the 487 people listed in the 2011 census.

Haddiscoe is located at the junction of the A143, between Gorleston-on-Sea and Haverhill, and the B1136, from Hales.

== St. Mary's Church ==
Haddiscoe's parish church is dedicated to Saint Mary and is one of Norfolk's 124 remaining round-tower churches. St. Mary's is located on Church Lane and has been Grade I listed since 1960. The church holds Sunday services once a month and is part of the Waveney Marshlands Benefice.

St. Mary's also features medieval carved stonework and stained-glass windows.

== St. Matthias' Church ==
Thorpe-next-Haddiscoe's church is dedicated to Saint Matthias and is another of Norfolk's 124 remaining round-tower churches. St. Matthias' is located on Church Road and has been Grade I listed since 1960. The church holds bimonthly Sunday services and is part of the Waveney Marshlands Benefice.

== Notable residents ==
- Sir John Arnesby Brown- (1866-1955) Notts County footballer and landscape gardener, lived and died in Haddiscoe.
- Janet Street Porter lives on Haddiscoe Island.

== Windmill ==
Toft Monks Windpump is a restored tower mill, built for draining the marshes.

== Governance ==
Haddiscoe is part of the electoral ward of Thurlton for local elections and is part of the district of South Norfolk.

The village's national constituency is South Norfolk which has been represented by the Labour's Ben Goldsborough MP since 2024.

== War Memorial ==
Haddiscoe War Memorial is a stone cross patee in St. Mary's Churchyard which lists the following names for the First World War:

Rank	Name	Unit	Date of death	Burial/Commemoration
Sgt.	George H. Haines	4th Bn., Norfolk Regiment	19 Apr. 1917	Jerusalem Memorial
Sgt.	George Grimmer MM	9th Bn., Norfolk Regt.	4 Dec. 1917	Cambrai Memorial
LCpl.	Reg H. Randlesome	1st Bn., Norfolk Regt.	24 Sep. 1918	St. Mary's Churchyard
Cpl.	Harold A. Meen	9th Bn., Norfolk Regt.	26 Sep. 1915	Loos Memorial
Gnr.	Leonard R. Culley	2 H.A. Group, Royal Garrison Artillery	25 Apr. 1917	Étaples Military Cemetery
Pte.	Jeffery Buxton	GHQ MT Coy., Army Service Corps	23 Oct. 1918	Montecchio Cemetery
Pte.	Isadore J. Youngs	2nd Bn., Bedfordshire Regiment	7 Jun. 1917	Perth Cemetery
Pte.	William E. Revell	8th Bn., Border Regiment	5 Jul. 1916	Thiepval Memorial
Pte.	William C. Mills	2nd Bn., Middlesex Regiment	24 Apr. 1918	Pozières Memorial
Pte.	George Wright	1st Bn., Norfolk Regiment	23 Nov. 1914	Menin Gate
Pte.	Victor Beevor	7th Bn., Norfolk Regt.	13 Oct. 1915	Loos Memorial
Pte.	Absalom C. Flaxman	7th Bn., Norfolk Regt.	13 Oct. 1915	Loos Memorial
Pte.	William Patrick	7th Bn., Norfolk Regt.	13 Oct. 1915	Loos Memorial
Pte.	Ernest Patrick	8th Bn., Norfolk Regt.	17 Feb. 1917	Stump Road Cemetery
Pte.	Harry Baldry	9th Bn., Norfolk Regt.	18 Oct. 1916	Thiepval Memorial
Pte.	Harry S. Grimmer	9th Bn., Norfolk Regt.	15 Sep. 1916	Thiepval Memorial
Pte.	Walter H. Stannard	1st Bn., Northamptonshire Regiment	25 Jul. 1916	Puchevillers Cemetery
Pte.	Harold Beevor	8th Bn., Royal Warwickshire Regt.	4 Oct. 1917	Tyne Cot
Rfn.	Harry Hayden	2nd Bn., Rifle Brigade	17 Mar. 1915	St. Sever Cemetery
Rfn.	Leonard Haines	10th Bn., Rifle Bde.	24 Oct. 1918	St. Mary's Churchyard
Eng.	Henry Symonds	H.M. Drifter Golden Rule	15 Feb. 1918	Chatham Naval Memorial
Tmr.	M. Barry Flaxman	H.M. Trawler Loch Ard	10 Sep. 1917	Chatham Naval Memorial

The following names were added after the Second World War:

Rank	Name	Unit	Date of death	Burial/Commemoration
FSgt.	Leonard P. Culley	No. 27 (Coastal) Squadron RAF	9 Jan. 1945	Kranji War Memorial
Sgt.	Neville J. Meen (Note: Sergeant Meen was declared missing (presumed dead) after taking off from Kairouan West Airfield, Tunisia as a navigator on a bombing raid of Viterbo Airfield, Italy.)	No. 142 (Bomber) Squadron RAF	16 Aug. 1943	Malta Memorial
Cpl.	John W. Beevor	Royal Air Force	15 Apr. 1941	Pietermaritzburg Cemetery
Pte.	John R. Rusted	2nd Bn., Royal Norfolk Regiment	21 May 1940	Chercq Cemetery
Smn.	Jack Read	H.M. Trawler Rodino	24 Jul. 1940	St. James' Churchyard
