= Oulton Dyke =

Watercourse in Suffolk, England

Coordinates: 52.4768°N 1.6820°E

Oulton Dyke is a freshwater stretch of water in the Norfolk Broads, located in Suffolk within the United Kingdom. The dyke connects Oulton Broad near Lowestoft to the River Waveney by means of a confluence near the village of Burgh St Peter.

Oulton Dyke is approximately one mile long, and from Oulton Broad heads west then after some 400 yards makes a sharp turn to the north to join with the River Waveney.
