= Oulton Broad =

Lake and suburb of Lowestoft, England

Coordinates: 52.474°N 1.710°E

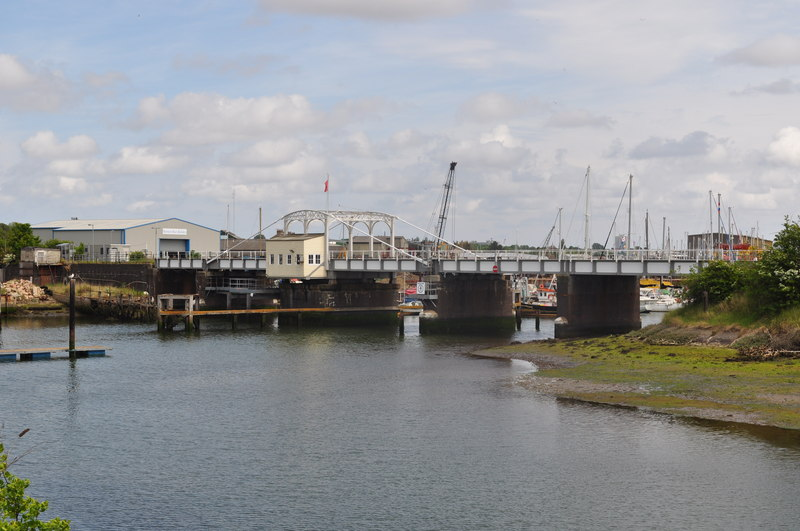
- Oulton Broad Swingbridge

- Location within Suffolk
- Area: 5 km^{2} (1.9 sq mi)
- Population: 10,338 (2011 est.)
  - Density: 2,068/km^{2} (5,360/sq mi)
- OS grid reference: TM521928
- District: East Suffolk
- Shire county: Suffolk
- Region: East
- Country: England
- Sovereign state: United Kingdom
- Post town: LOWESTOFT
- Postcode district: NR32, NR33
- Dialling code: 01502
- UK Parliament: Lowestoft

Oulton Broad refers to both the lake and the suburb of Lowestoft, Suffolk, England.

The suburb is located 2 miles (3.2 km) west of the centre of Lowestoft. It became a civil parish in 2017. It had an estimated population of 10,338 at the 2011 United Kingdom census. (Note: The population estimate for 2011 was calculated by using "best fit" data from lower output areas. These may not match the precise area of the parish. As a result the estimate is approximate.)

== Oulton Broad ==
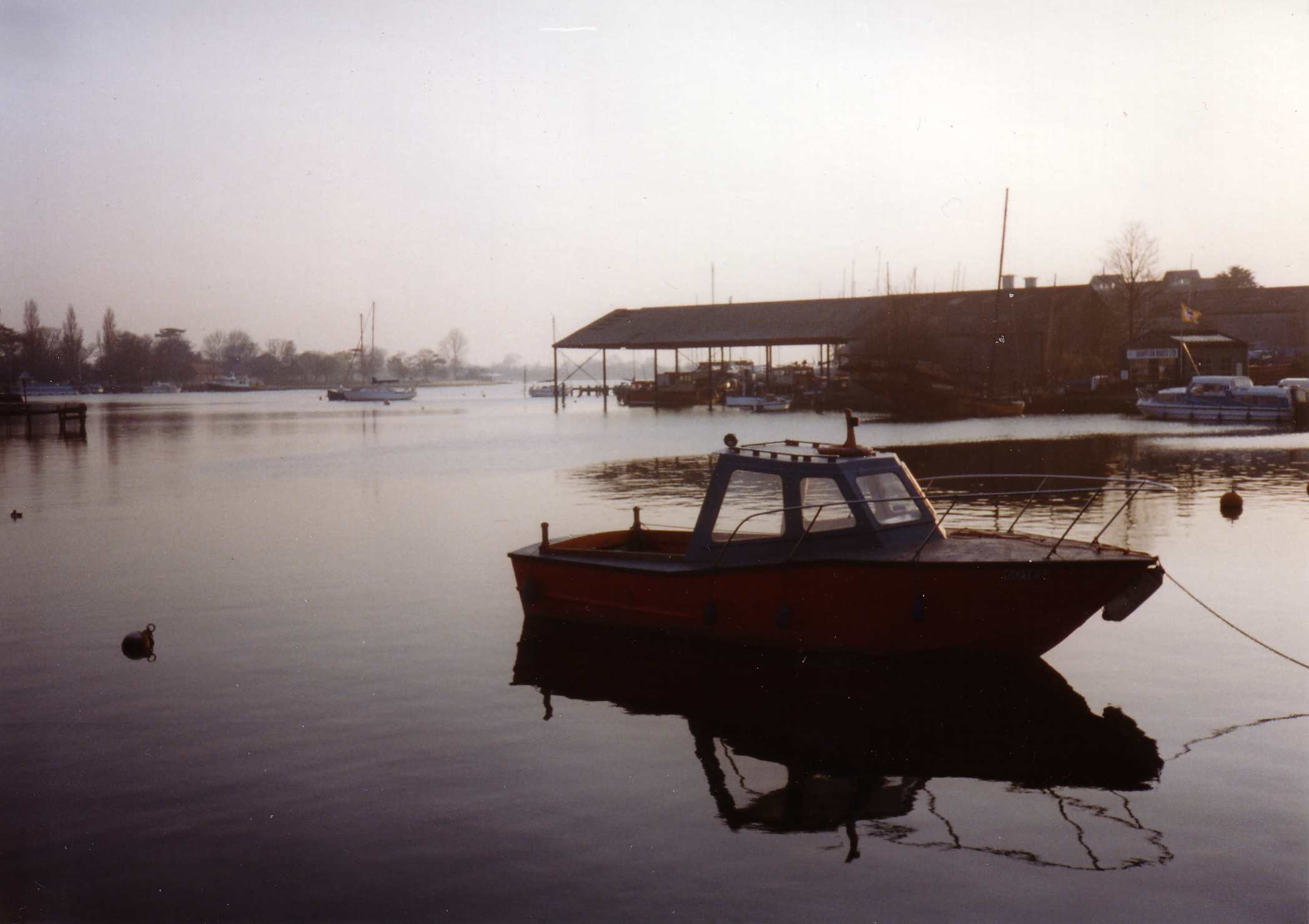
Oulton Broad, September 1995. From the Commodore Road edge

Oulton Broad is an expanse of water and marsh which forms part of the network of man-made bodies of water known as The Broads. It is believed to be the remnant of medieval peat cutting. To the east it is linked by Mutford Lock to the saltwater Lake Lothing which passes through the centre of Lowestoft and flows into the North Sea. To the west it is linked by Oulton Dyke to the River Waveney.

The Broad is the most southern area of open water in the Broads system, and is a busy tourist and sporting centre. It is used for a variety of watersports, including powerboat racing, and as the base for boat hire. Facilities include a yacht station and moorings as well as a 'village' of holiday chalets. Nicholas Everitt Park has an extensive water frontage. It is one of the few broads with residential areas adjacent, with houses to the north and flats to the east. The north side of the Broad is one of the most expensive residential areas in Lowestoft, with large detached houses having lake frontage.

While the eastern and north shores of the Broad are built up, the west and south-west are quiet and natural. This part of the lake can be reached on foot by walking through Nicholas Everitt Park and then by public footpaths and field across White Cast Marshes, an important nature conservation area.

== Oulton Broad village ==
Oulton Broad first became a civil parish in 1904, having previously been split between Oulton, to the north, and Carlton Colville to the south. It lost its parish status in 1919, at which point it was absorbed into Lowestoft. Following the expansion of Lowestoft in the late 1950s, both Oulton Broad and its neighbouring parishes were merged with the town. The parish extends either side of Lake Lothing and the Broad, with Bridge Road as its main shopping street.

Oulton Broad is served by two railway stations: Oulton Broad North on the Wherry Lines between Lowestoft and Norwich, and Oulton Broad South on the East Suffolk Line between Lowestoft and Ipswich.

=== Nicholas Everitt Park ===
Nicholas Everitt Park is on waterfront on the south side of Oulton Broad. Lowestoft Museum in the park was opened by Queen Elizabeth II. It houses one of the world's largest collections of Lowestoft porcelain. The Waveney and Oulton Broad Yacht Club is also located in Nicholas Everitt Park.

== Notable people ==
After marrying in 1840 the writer, traveller, and walker George Borrow moved to his wife's estate in Oulton Broad. In between travels he wrote several books there. During the 1850s he moved away, but returned to Oulton Broad in 1874 where he stayed until his death in 1881. A hotel in the area was named after him, and now houses the head office of Hayden Chemists.

Lieutenant-General Sir Edwin Alderson, a keen yachtsman and canoeist, lived in his last years on a houseboat moored at Oulton Broad, called "Fox", up until the month before his death in 1927. He and his wife entertained, especially during the yachting season, and he encouraged the Royal Canoe Sailing Club to hold competitions on the Broad.
