= Berney Arms railway station =

Railway station in Norfolk, England

Berney Arms
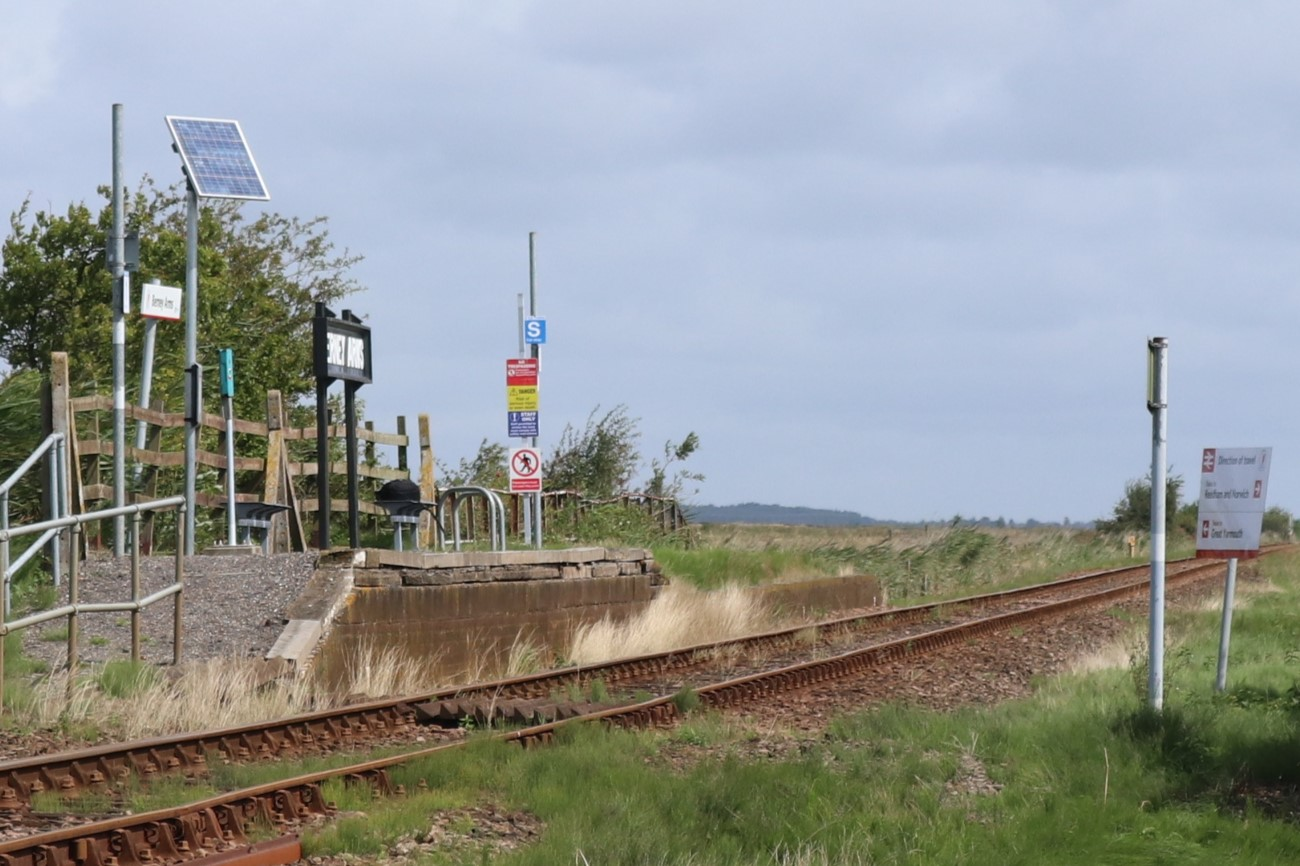
- The station in 2023

General information
- Location: Berney Arms, Broadland, England
- Coordinates: 52°35′24″N 1°37′51″E
- Grid reference: TG460053
- Manager: Greater Anglia
- Platforms: 1

Other information
- Station code: BYA
- Classification: DfT category F2

History
- Original company: Yarmouth and Norwich Railway; Eastern Counties Railway
- Pre-grouping: Great Eastern Railway
- Post-grouping: London and North Eastern Railway

Key dates
- 1 May 1844: Opened

Passengers
- 2021/22: ▲868
- 2022/23: ▲950
- 2023/24: ▼800
- 2024/25: ▲802
- 2025/26: ▲820
Location
Notes
- Passenger statistics from the Office of Rail and Road

Berney Arms railway station serves the settlement of Berney Arms, on the Halvergate Marshes, in Norfolk, England. It is a stop on the Wherry Lines, 15 miles 71 chains (15.9 mi; 25.6 km) east of Norwich, and is the only station on a short stretch of single line between Reedham and Great Yarmouth. The station is managed by Greater Anglia, which also operates all trains serving it. It is situated in a remote area of the Norfolk Broads, resulting in it becoming one of the least used stations in Britain.

== History ==
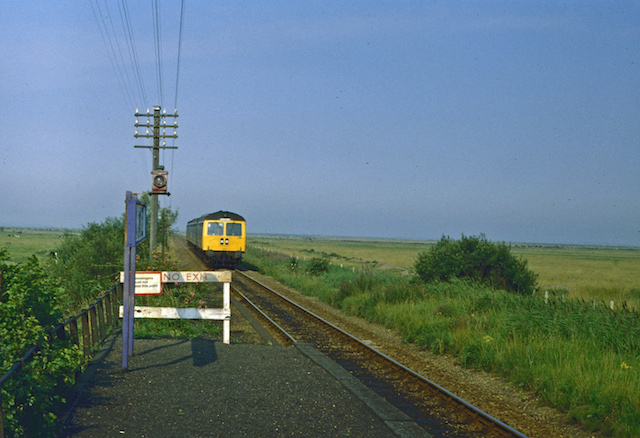
Berney Arms station in the 1970s

Construction started on the line in April 1843, and the station was opened on 1 May 1844. A local landowner, Thomas Trench Berney, sold the land on the marshes to the railway company on the condition that Berney Arms station be built.

A few years later, the railway stopped serving it, saying that there had been no agreement for trains to actually call at the station that they agreed to build; however, after lengthy legal proceedings, it was agreed to serve the station in perpetuity.

On 30 June 1845, the Norfolk Railway Act 1845 (8 & 9 Vict. c. xli) was passed, authorising the amalgamation of the Y&NR with the Norwich and Brandon Railway, and Berney Arms station became a Norfolk Railway asset. It passed to the Great Eastern Railway (GER) on 1 July 1862, when the GER took over two other railways before the bill received its royal assent.

The former signal box, which closed in the 1960s and replaced an earlier box, is located at Mangapps Railway Museum as of 2026. There was also once a post office at the station, which was delivered from Great Yarmouth by train twice per week.

Between October 2018 and February 2020, the line between Great Yarmouth and Reedham was closed for a major upgrade of the signalling system, as part of works on all the Wherry Lines. The station remained open, although no replacement service was available due to its remote location.

== Location ==
The surrounding marshland is managed as the RSPB Berney Marshes reserve and is adjacent to Breydon Water, a major site for wildfowl. It lies three miles from the nearest road, and thus is accessible only by train, on foot or by boat (on the river Yare).

Berney Arms Windmill, owned by English Heritage, is located on the Yare near to the station; the Berney Arms public house, also nearby, closed in 2015, although a "Save the Berney Arms" campaign was started the year after. The Weavers' Way and Wherryman's Way long-distance footpaths both pass near to the station, and the station is popular with walkers.

== Facilities ==
Several waiting shelters were erected at the station in the past, but were damaged or destroyed by the strong marshland winds common to the area. The only extant facilities at the station are some bicycle racks and a help point. As there are no facilities to purchase tickets, passengers must buy one in advance or from the guard on the train.

== Passenger volume ==
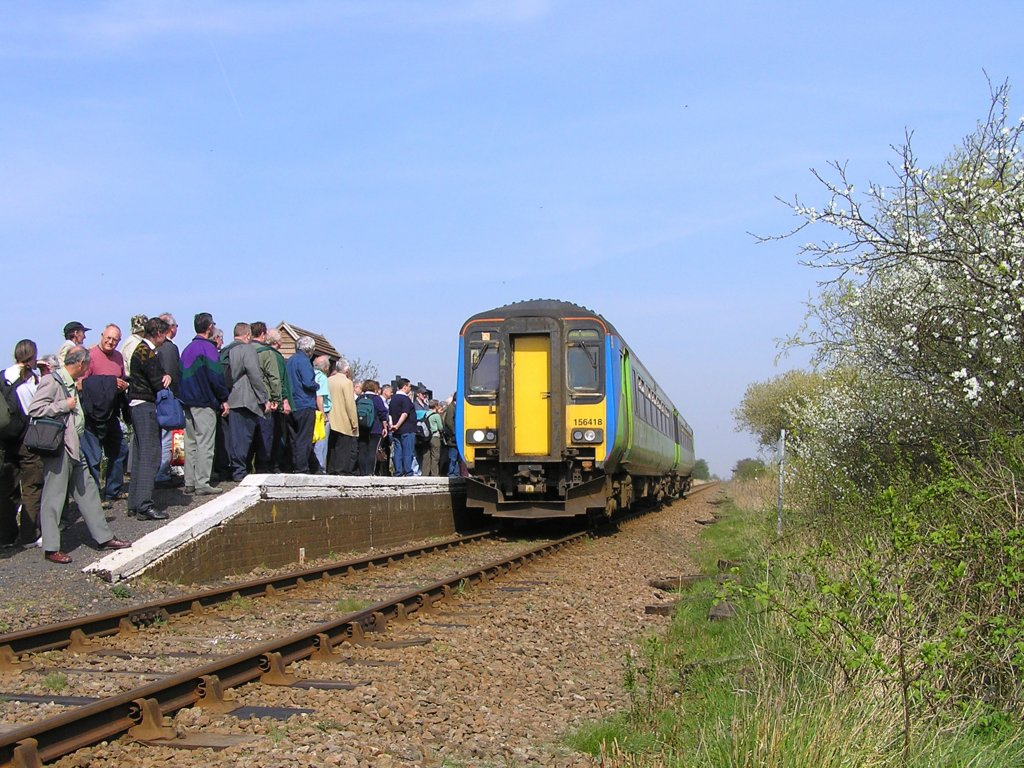
The station on a busier day; 64 passengers embark on a Class 156 train for Norwich, as part of a Rail Ale Ramble in 2009

On 1 December 2020, Berney Arms was announced as the least-used station in Great Britain for the 2019/20 period, (Note: April 2019-March 2020.) with only 42 passengers using the station. The low numbers were largely due to the station being closed for major signalling works along the line for much of the 2019/20 period, but also as a result of the local pub closing; this is also one of the main reasons that passenger numbers had been falling since 2016/17.

However, the station was used by 348 passengers in the year to March 2021, the greatest annual percentage increase for any station in Great Britain. Some of this increase was attributed to rail enthusiasts and the publicity surrounding the station's least used status.

Passenger volume at Berney Arms
	2004–05	2005–06	2006–07	2007–08	2008–09	2009–10	2010–11	2011–12	2012–13	2013–14	2014–15	2015–16	2016–17	2017–18	2018–19	2019–20	2020–21	2021–22	2022–23	2023–24	2024–25
Entries and exits (Note: The statistics cover 12-month periods that start in April.)	806	896	722	1,014	1,038	1,628	1,686	1,436	1,054	1,510	1,396	1,016	1,126	966	442	42	348	868	950	800	802

== Services ==
Two trains per day in each direction stop here between Norwich and Great Yarmouth on Mondays-Saturdays; the service is increased on Sundays to four trains in each direction. Service frequencies generally increase slightly during the summer period, to three trains in each direction per day and five in each direction on Sundays. Services are operated by Greater Anglia.

Preceding station	National Rail	Following station
Reedham	Greater Anglia; Wherry Lines	Great Yarmouth

== Bibliography ==
- Marshall, Geoff; Pipe, Vicki (2018). The Railway Adventures: Places, Trains, People and Stations. September Publishing. ISBN 978-1-91-046387-1.
- Quick, Michael (2023). Railway Passenger Stations in Great Britain: A Chronology (PDF) (5th ed.). London: Railway and Canal Historical Society.
- Wills, Dixe (2014). Tiny Stations (Paperback, first reprint ed.). Basingstoke: AA Publishing. ISBN 978-0-74-957732-2.
