= Lockgate Mill =

Windmill in Great Yarmouth, Norfolk, England

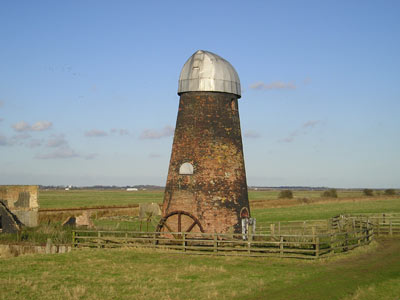
- Lockgate Mill
- Interactive map of Lockgate Mill

Origin
- Mill location: 2 miles west of Great Yarmouth
- Grid reference: TG4802507140
- Coordinates: 52.60592°N 1.66126°E
- Year built: Late 19th-century

Lockgate Mill also referred to locally and historically as Freethorpe Mill, 'Banham's Black Mill' and 'Duffel's Mill' is a windpump located on the Halvergate Marshes in the detached parish of Freethorpe within The Broads in the English county of Norfolk. It is approximately 2 miles (3.2 km) west of Great Yarmouth, and 3 miles (4.8 km) north-east of Berney Arms on the northern edge of Breydon Water. The structure is a Grade II listed building.

== History ==
The current mill at this location was built sometime between 1800 and 1825 under the name 'Freethorpe Mill', it is four storeys high and built of red brick tarred black. The structure stands at 35 feet to the curb and the diameter of the base is 24 feet, housing two doors and 4 windows. A farm once stood next to the mill, it was known as Lockgate Farm and was demolished in 1981 after many years of being derelict.

When operational, the mill was driven by four patent sails that turned in a clockwise direction, these drove a 19 ft diameter external scoopwheel with 7 inch paddles. Unusually for a mill on the halvergate marshes it didn't drain into the Halvergate Fleet even though it is only 800 yards from the connection of the fleet with Breydon water. Instead it drained Acle marshes that lie to the north of the mill.

The earliest recorded marshman of the mill was a Mr Dan Banham, followed subsequently by Mr Bob Banham. The Banham family ceased working the mill in the early 1920s and was taken over for a short period by Mr Gordon Addison, who lived in the nearby Lockgate Farm. The final marshman that worked the mill was Mr Leonard Carter, who left the mill in the mid-1940s.

After Leonard Carter left the mill, it began to fall into disrepair. In 1953 the sails were blown off the mill in a gale and was left to deteriorate until a temporary aluminium cap was fitted in 1988 to protect the remains of the mill.

== Today ==
In 2001 a fire started by vandals damaged the inside of the mill and has blackened some of the external and internal brickwork. The mill can be reached on the Weavers' Way and Wherryman's Way footpaths between Yarmout and Berney Arms. Access to the mill is prohibited and a fence blocks access due to the unsafe state the structure is in.
