= Listed buildings in the borough of Great Yarmouth (non civil parish) =

Listed buildings in town of Great Yarmouth, Norfolk, England

Great Yarmouth is a town in the Borough of Great Yarmouth in Norfolk, England. Besides Great Yarmouth, the unparished area of the borough includes Gorleston-on-Sea. As of 3 November 2026, the unparished area contained 253 listed buildings recorded in the National Heritage List for England. Of these 7 are grade I, 15 are grade II* and 231 are grade II.

This list below is based on the information retrieved online from Historic England on 31 January 2026.

== Key ==
| Grade | Criteria |
|---|---|
| I | Buildings that are of exceptional interest |
| II* | Particularly important buildings of more than special interest |
| II | Buildings that are of special interest |

== Listing ==
| Name | Grade | Location | Type | Completed (Note: The date given is the date used by Historic England as significant for the initial building or that of an important part in the structure's description.) | Date designated | Grid ref. (Note: The grid reference is based on the British national grid reference system, sometimes known as OSGB36, used by the Ordnance Survey.) Geo-coordinates | Notes | Entry number (Note: The "List Entry Number" is a unique number assigned to each listed building and scheduled monument by Historic England.) | Image | Wikidata |
|---|---|---|---|---|---|---|---|---|---|---|
| 6, 7 and 8, Row 111 | II | 6, 7 and 8, Row 111 | | | 26 February 1998 | TG5245807193; 52°36′14″N 1°43′37″E | | 1245916 | Upload Photo | Q17648319 |
| Old Merchants House | II* | 8, Row 117 | house | | 27 June 1953 | TG5246207142; 52°36′12″N 1°43′37″E | | 1245917 | Old Merchants House More images | Q17554502 |
| Number 2 and Attached Warehouse | II | Row 71 | | | 26 February 1998 | TG5235707459; 52°36′22″N 1°43′32″E | | 1245914 | Upload Photo | Q26538384 |
| Remains of the Church of the Greyfriars | I | Row 92 | friary | | 27 June 1953 | TG5240307330; 52°36′18″N 1°43′34″E | | 1245915 | Remains of the Church of the Greyfriars More images | Q5600300 |
| Gasholder Number 172 at Former Great Yarmouth Gasworks | II | NR30 3DR | | | 26 February 1998 | TG5273206134; 52°35′39″N 1°43′49″E | | 1096789 | Upload Photo | Q26389058 |
| The Iron Duke | II | NR30 4HG | pub | | 22 November 2017 | TG5309009905; 52°37′40″N 1°44′18″E | | 1451795 | The Iron Duke More images | Q55457632 |
| Wind Pump at Ashtree Farm | II | Acle New Road | building | | 25 September 1962 | TG5066609501; 52°37′31″N 1°42′08″E | | 1096786 | Wind Pump at Ashtree Farm More images | Q26389055 |
| Mayflower Hotel (number 5) St Georges Hotel (numbers 7-8) | II | 1-8, Albert Square | | | 27 June 1953 | TG5298106779; 52°35′59″N 1°44′04″E | | 1096787 | Upload Photo | Q26389056 |
| 33, Baker Street | II | 33, Baker Street, Southtown And Gorleston | | | 5 August 1974 | TG5271604276; 52°34′39″N 1°43′43″E | | 1096788 | Upload Photo | Q26389057 |
| Southtown and Gorleston Methodist Church | II | Beccles Road | | | 10 December 1996 | TG5241105346; 52°35′14″N 1°43′29″E | | 1096790 | Upload Photo | Q26389059 |
| Tower Fish Curing Works | II | 16, Blackfriars Road | | | 24 July 1989 | TG5276806977; 52°36′06″N 1°43′53″E | | 1096791 | Upload Photo | Q26389060 |
| 9-13, Blackwall Reach | II | 9-13, Blackwall Reach, Southtown And Gorleston | | | 26 February 1998 | TG5273704360; 52°34′42″N 1°43′44″E | | 1096792 | Upload Photo | Q26389061 |
| Lockgate Mill | II | Breydon Water | mill | | 11 April 1986 | TG4802707143; 52°36′19″N 1°39′42″E | | 1096793 | Lockgate Mill More images | Q6665474 |
| Former Ice House | II | Bridge House, Southtown And Gorleston | warehouse | | 9 December 1976 | TG5213607445; 52°36′22″N 1°43′21″E | | 1096794 | Former Ice House More images | Q26389062 |
| 3, Broad Row | II | 3, Broad Row | | | 5 August 1974 | TG5220207664; 52°36′29″N 1°43′25″E | | 1096795 | Upload Photo | Q26389063 |
| 4, Broad Row | II | 4, Broad Row | | | 5 August 1974 | TG5220707665; 52°36′29″N 1°43′25″E | | 1096796 | Upload Photo | Q26389064 |
| 5, Broad Row | II | 5, Broad Row | | | 5 August 1974 | TG5221107665; 52°36′29″N 1°43′25″E | | 1096797 | Upload Photo | Q26389065 |
| 12 and 13, Broad Row | II | 12 and 13, Broad Row | | | 10 December 1996 | TG5225207668; 52°36′29″N 1°43′27″E | | 1096799 | Upload Photo | Q26389067 |
| 14, Broad Row | II | 14, Broad Row | | | 26 February 1998 | TG5226107667; 52°36′29″N 1°43′28″E | | 1096800 | Upload Photo | Q26389068 |
| 19, Broad Row | II | 19, Broad Row | | | 5 August 1974 | TG5225507655; 52°36′29″N 1°43′27″E | | 1096801 | Upload Photo | Q26389069 |
| 20 and 21, Broad Row | II | 20 and 21, Broad Row | | | 5 August 1974 | TG5224807656; 52°36′29″N 1°43′27″E | | 1096802 | Upload Photo | Q26389070 |
| 26, Broad Row | II | 26, Broad Row | | | 26 February 1998 | TG5221407655; 52°36′29″N 1°43′25″E | | 1096803 | Upload Photo | Q26389071 |
| Warehouse to Rear of Number 11 (number 11 Not Included), Broad Row | II | Broad Row | | | 26 February 1998 | TG5224207681; 52°36′30″N 1°43′27″E | | 1096798 | Upload Photo | Q26389066 |
| Remains of Austin Friars Priory | II | Burnt Lane, Southtown And Gorleston | | | 26 February 1998 | TG5241705260; 52°35′11″N 1°43′30″E | | 1096804 | Upload Photo | Q26389072 |
| 1, 1a and 2-18, Camperdown | II | 1, 1a and 2-18, Camperdown | | | 27 June 1953 | TG5295406874; 52°36′03″N 1°44′02″E | | 1096805 | Upload Photo | Q26389073 |
| 25-28 and 30-41, Camperdown | II | 25-28 and 30-41 (consec), Camperdown | | | 27 June 1953 | TG5295206840; 52°36′01″N 1°44′02″E | | 1096806 | Upload Photo | Q26389074 |
| Church of St Andrew | II* | Church Lane, Gorleston On Sea, NR31 6LS, Southtown And Gorleston | church building | | 27 June 1953 | TG5244704408; 52°34′44″N 1°43′29″E | | 1096807 | Church of St Andrew More images | Q17554422 |
| Hardys | II | 7, Church Plain | | | 27 June 1953 | TG5233207881; 52°36′36″N 1°43′32″E | | 1096808 | Upload Photo | Q26389075 |
| Vicarage | II* | 24, Church Plain | | | 27 June 1953 | TG5243107982; 52°36′39″N 1°43′38″E | | 1096809 | Upload Photo | Q17554427 |
| 25, Church Plain | II | 25, Church Plain | | | 10 April 1974 | TG5243207961; 52°36′39″N 1°43′38″E | | 1096810 | Upload Photo | Q26389076 |
| Sewell House | II | 26, Church Plain | house | | 27 June 1953 | TG5242707957; 52°36′38″N 1°43′37″E | | 1096811 | Sewell House More images | Q26389077 |
| 27, Church Plain | II | 27, Church Plain | | | 10 April 1974 | TG5242707953; 52°36′38″N 1°43′37″E | | 1096812 | Upload Photo | Q26389078 |
| Church of St Nicholas | II* | Church Plain, NR30 1NE | church building | | 27 June 1953 | TG5243508036; 52°36′41″N 1°43′38″E | | 1096813 | Church of St Nicholas More images | Q5600303 |
| Fishermens Hospital Including Gate Piers and Railings | I | Church Plain | hospital | | 27 June 1953 | TG5244907886; 52°36′36″N 1°43′38″E | | 1096820 | Fishermens Hospital Including Gate Piers and Railings More images | Q17535982 |
| Group of Seven Chest Tombs Approximately 128 Metres East of Church of St Nicholas | II | Church Plain | | | 26 February 1998 | TG5260608045; 52°36′41″N 1°43′47″E | | 1096815 | Upload Photo | Q26389080 |
| Headstone 15 Metres North-east of Church of St Nicholas | II | Church Plain | | | 26 February 1998 | TG5249608035; 52°36′41″N 1°43′41″E | | 1096816 | Upload Photo | Q26389081 |
| Memorial to David Bartleman West of Church of St Nicholas | II | Church Plain | | | 26 February 1998 | TG5237708026; 52°36′41″N 1°43′35″E | | 1096817 | Upload Photo | Q26389082 |
| Memorial to George Beloe South of Church of St Nicholas | II | Church Plain | | | 26 February 1998 | TG5244108002; 52°36′40″N 1°43′38″E | | 1096818 | Upload Photo | Q26389083 |
| Palmer Tomb 18 Metres West of Church of St Nicholas | II | Church Plain | | | 26 February 1998 | TG5238808050; 52°36′42″N 1°43′36″E | | 1096819 | Upload Photo | Q26389084 |
| Statue of Charity in Courtyard of Fishermans Hospital | II | Church Plain | | | 26 February 1998 | TG5244007887; 52°36′36″N 1°43′38″E | | 1096821 | Upload Photo | Q26389085 |
| Cliff Cottage | II | 24, Cliff Hill, Southtown And Gorleston | | | 5 August 1974 | TG5288903687; 52°34′20″N 1°43′50″E | | 1096822 | Upload Photo | Q26389086 |
| Eastland House | II | 32, Cliff Hill, Southtown And Gorleston | | | 5 August 1974 | TG5287503728; 52°34′21″N 1°43′50″E | | 1096823 | Upload Photo | Q26389087 |
| Old Custom House | II | 36, Cliff Hill, Southtown And Gorleston | | | 5 August 1974 | TG5286503755; 52°34′22″N 1°43′49″E | | 1096824 | Upload Photo | Q26389088 |
| 37, Cliff Hill | II | 37, Cliff Hill, Southtown And Gorleston | | | 5 August 1974 | TG5286003764; 52°34′22″N 1°43′49″E | | 1096825 | Upload Photo | Q26389089 |
| Wood Hall Hotel | II | 15, Dene Side | | | 27 June 1953 | TG5271907147; 52°36′12″N 1°43′51″E | | 1096826 | Upload Photo | Q26389090 |
| Church of St Spyridon | II | Dene Side | church building | | 27 June 1953 | TG5272607101; 52°36′10″N 1°43′51″E | | 1096827 | Church of St Spyridon More images | Q26389091 |
| Feathers Inn | II | 123, Feathers Plain, Southtown And Gorleston | pub | | 5 August 1974 | TG5266004311; 52°34′40″N 1°43′40″E | | 1096828 | Feathers Inn More images | Q26389092 |
| Dolphin Public House | II | Fish Wharf | pub | | 26 February 1998 | TG5257706049; 52°35′37″N 1°43′40″E | | 1096829 | Dolphin Public House More images | Q26389093 |
| 1, George Street | II | 1, George Street | | | 5 August 1974 | TG5217507630; 52°36′28″N 1°43′23″E | | 1096830 | Upload Photo | Q26389094 |
| 3, George Street | II | 3, George Street | | | 5 August 1974 | TG5217707636; 52°36′28″N 1°43′23″E | | 1096831 | Upload Photo | Q26389095 |
| 6-12, George Street | II | 6-12, George Street | | | 27 June 1953 | TG5219707643; 52°36′29″N 1°43′24″E | | 1096832 | Upload Photo | Q26389096 |
| Tudor Cottage | II | 19 Elmgrove Road, Gorleston, NR31 7PP | | | 9 August 2018 | TG5231803446; 52°34′13″N 1°43′19″E | | 1459030 | Upload Photo | Q66479917 |
| Cemetery Lodge, Gorleston Old Cemetery | II | Gorleston Old Cemetery, Magdalen Way, Gorleston-on-sea | | | 6 September 2010 | TG5195104368; 52°34′43″N 1°43′02″E | | 1393953 | Upload Photo | Q26673087 |
| 3, Greyfriars Way | II | 3, Greyfriars Way | | | 5 August 1974 | TG5238307427; 52°36′21″N 1°43′34″E | | 1096833 | Upload Photo | Q26389097 |
| Ship Inn | II | 4, Greyfriars Way | | | 5 August 1974 | TG5241007389; 52°36′20″N 1°43′35″E | | 1096834 | Ship Inn More images | Q26389098 |
| Greyfriars House | II | Greyfriars Way, NR30 2QE | | | 8 August 1974 | TG5239407414; 52°36′21″N 1°43′34″E | | 1096835 | Upload Photo | Q26389099 |
| 29, Hall Plain | II | 29, Hall Plain | | | 26 February 1998 | TG5234607447; 52°36′22″N 1°43′32″E | | 1096836 | Upload Photo | Q26389100 |
| Hall Quay Club | II | 4 and 5, Hall Quay | | | 27 June 1953 | TG5216007618; 52°36′28″N 1°43′22″E | | 1096837 | Upload Photo | Q26389101 |
| 6, Hall Quay | II | 6, Hall Quay | | | 5 August 1974 | TG5217607624; 52°36′28″N 1°43′23″E | | 1096838 | Upload Photo | Q26389102 |
| Dukes Head Public House | II | 13, Hall Quay | | | 27 June 1953 | TG5220907583; 52°36′27″N 1°43′25″E | | 1096839 | Dukes Head Public House More images | Q26389103 |
| Barclays Bank | II | 15, Hall Quay | | | 27 June 1953 | TG5222307564; 52°36′26″N 1°43′26″E | | 1096840 | Upload Photo | Q26389104 |
| 16, Hall Quay | II | 16, Hall Quay | | | 27 June 1953 | TG5222907554; 52°36′26″N 1°43′26″E | | 1096841 | Upload Photo | Q26389105 |
| Lloyds Bank | II | 19, Hall Quay | | | 27 June 1953 | TG5224807535; 52°36′25″N 1°43′27″E | | 1096842 | Upload Photo | Q26389106 |
| National Westminster Bank | II | 23, Hall Quay | | | 26 June 1990 | TG5228607515; 52°36′24″N 1°43′29″E | | 1246967 | Upload Photo | Q26539320 |
| Star Hotel | II | 24, Hall Quay | hotel | | 26 February 1998 | TG5229007502; 52°36′24″N 1°43′29″E | | 1246968 | Star Hotel More images | Q7600747 |
| Town Hall | II* | Hall Quay | city hall | | 5 August 1974 | TG5231307426; 52°36′21″N 1°43′30″E | | 1246969 | Town Hall More images | Q17554528 |
| Manby House and Ahoy | II | 87, High Road, Southtown And Gorleston | | | 27 June 1953 | TG5260905352; 52°35′14″N 1°43′40″E | | 1246970 | Upload Photo | Q26539321 |
| 95, High Road | II | 95, High Road, Southtown And Gorleston | | | 27 June 1953 | TG5257905414; 52°35′16″N 1°43′39″E | | 1246971 | Upload Photo | Q26539322 |
| 96, High Road | II | 96, High Road, Southtown And Gorleston | | | 27 June 1953 | TG5257505424; 52°35′16″N 1°43′38″E | | 1246972 | Upload Photo | Q26539323 |
| Providence Villa | II | 97, High Road, Southtown And Gorleston | | | 27 June 1953 | TG5257005433; 52°35′17″N 1°43′38″E | | 1246973 | Upload Photo | Q26539324 |
| Koolunga House | II | High Road, Southtown And Gorleston | | | 27 June 1953 | TG5260805230; 52°35′10″N 1°43′40″E | | 1246974 | Upload Photo | Q26539325 |
| The Short Blue Public House | II | 47, High Street, Southtown And Gorleston | pub | | 5 August 1974 | TG5272104845; 52°34′57″N 1°43′45″E | | 1246975 | The Short Blue Public House More images | Q26539326 |
| 102, High Street | II | 102, High Street, Southtown And Gorleston | | | 27 June 1953 | TG5268204482; 52°34′46″N 1°43′41″E | | 1246976 | Upload Photo | Q26539327 |
| 235, High Street | II | 235, High Street, Southtown And Gorleston | | | 5 August 1974 | TG5267105023; 52°35′03″N 1°43′42″E | | 1246977 | Upload Photo | Q26539328 |
| Milepost in Front of Number 245 (number 245 Not Included) | II | High Street, Southtown And Gorleston | | | 26 February 1998 | TG5265705084; 52°35′05″N 1°43′42″E | | 1246978 | Upload Photo | Q26539329 |
| 2, Howard Street South | II | 2, Howard Street South | | | 5 August 1974 | TG5228107660; 52°36′29″N 1°43′29″E | | 1271265 | Upload Photo | Q26561233 |
| 3, Howard Street South | II | 3, Howard Street South | | | 5 August 1974 | TG5228207654; 52°36′29″N 1°43′29″E | | 1271266 | Upload Photo | Q26561234 |
| Friends Meeting House Including Burial Ground Walls | II | 17, Howard Street South | | | 5 August 1974 | TG5233307543; 52°36′25″N 1°43′31″E | | 1271267 | Upload Photo | Q26561235 |
| 76 and 77, Howard Street South | II | 76 and 77, Howard Street South | | | 5 August 1974 | TG5228207596; 52°36′27″N 1°43′29″E | | 1271268 | Upload Photo | Q26561236 |
| Carlton Hotel (numbers 1-5) | II | 1-11, Kimberley Terrace | hotel | | 27 June 1953 | TG5302206805; 52°36′00″N 1°44′06″E | | 1271269 | Carlton Hotel (numbers 1-5) More images | Q26561237 |
| 24 and 24a, King Street | II | 24 and 24a, King Street | | | 5 August 1974 | TG5252807463; 52°36′22″N 1°43′41″E | | 1271270 | Upload Photo | Q26561238 |
| 33, King Street (see Details for Further Address Information) | II | 33, King Street | | | 5 August 1974 | TG5262607285; 52°36′16″N 1°43′46″E | | 1271271 | Upload Photo | Q26561239 |
| 34, King Street | II | 34, King Street | | | 5 August 1974 | TG5262907280; 52°36′16″N 1°43′46″E | | 1271272 | Upload Photo | Q26561240 |
| Former Gas Showroom | II | 39-40, King Street | | | 5 March 2010 | TG5264607253; 52°36′15″N 1°43′47″E | | 1393704 | Upload Photo | Q26672850 |
| Kings Wine Bar Including Step Railings | II | 42, King Street | pub | | 27 June 1953 | TG5264607232; 52°36′15″N 1°43′47″E | | 1271274 | Kings Wine Bar Including Step Railings More images | Q26561242 |
| Number 43 Including 2 Stable Ranges to Rear | II | 43, King Street | | | 5 August 1974 | TG5264907222; 52°36′14″N 1°43′47″E | | 1271275 | Upload Photo | Q26561243 |
| Number 44 Including Railings to Steps | II | 44, King Street | | | 5 August 1974 | TG5264807213; 52°36′14″N 1°43′47″E | | 1271276 | Upload Photo | Q26561244 |
| Working Mens Club | II | 51, King Street | | | 27 June 1953 | TG5266007161; 52°36′12″N 1°43′48″E | | 1271277 | Upload Photo | Q26561245 |
| Old White Lion Public House | II* | 112, King Street | pub | | 27 June 1953 | TG5265207083; 52°36′10″N 1°43′47″E | | 1271278 | Old White Lion Public House More images | Q17554532 |
| 123 and 123a, King Street | II | 123 and 123a, King Street | | | 5 August 1974 | TG5263907161; 52°36′12″N 1°43′47″E | | 1246587 | Upload Photo | Q26538985 |
| 126 and 127, King Street | II | 126 and 127, King Street | | | 5 August 1974 | TG5263407184; 52°36′13″N 1°43′46″E | | 1246588 | Upload Photo | Q26538986 |
| 131, King Street | II | 131, King Street | | | 27 June 1953 | TG5262907208; 52°36′14″N 1°43′46″E | | 1246589 | Upload Photo | Q26538987 |
| 132, King Street | II | 132, King Street | | | 5 August 1974 | TG5262707217; 52°36′14″N 1°43′46″E | | 1246590 | Upload Photo | Q26538988 |
| 133, King Street | II | 133, King Street | | | 27 June 1953 | TG5262207227; 52°36′15″N 1°43′46″E | | 1246591 | Upload Photo | Q26538989 |
| 134 and 134a, King Street | II | 134 and 134a, King Street | | | 5 August 1974 | TG5261807238; 52°36′15″N 1°43′46″E | | 1246592 | Upload Photo | Q26538990 |
| 135, King Street | II | 135, King Street | | | 5 August 1974 | TG5261607246; 52°36′15″N 1°43′46″E | | 1246593 | Upload Photo | Q26538991 |
| 136, King Street | II | 136, King Street | | | 5 August 1974 | TG5261307255; 52°36′15″N 1°43′45″E | | 1246594 | Upload Photo | Q26538992 |
| 137 and 138, King Street | II | 137 and 138, King Street | | | 27 June 1953 | TG5261107265; 52°36′16″N 1°43′45″E | | 1246595 | Upload Photo | Q26538993 |
| 139, King Street | II | 139, King Street | | | 27 June 1953 | TG5260807272; 52°36′16″N 1°43′45″E | | 1246596 | Upload Photo | Q26538994 |
| Liberties Public House | II | 140, King Street | pub | | 5 August 1974 | TG5260507280; 52°36′16″N 1°43′45″E | | 1246597 | Liberties Public House More images | Q26538995 |
| Number 141 Including Area Railings | II | 141, King Street | | | 27 June 1953 | TG5259807292; 52°36′17″N 1°43′45″E | | 1246598 | Upload Photo | Q26538996 |
| 142, King Street | II | 142, King Street | | | 27 June 1953 | TG5259507301; 52°36′17″N 1°43′45″E | | 1246599 | Upload Photo | Q26538997 |
| 143, King Street | II | 143, King Street | | | 27 June 1953 | TG5259307305; 52°36′17″N 1°43′44″E | | 1246600 | Upload Photo | Q26538998 |
| 144, King Street | II | 144, King Street | | | 26 June 1953 | TG5259007311; 52°36′17″N 1°43′44″E | | 1246601 | Upload Photo | Q26538999 |
| Number 145 Including Basement Area Railings in Front | II | 145, King Street | | | 11 August 1988 | TG5257907317; 52°36′18″N 1°43′44″E | | 1246602 | Upload Photo | Q26539000 |
| Number 148 Including Railings to Doorway | II | 148, King Street | | | 27 June 1953 | TG5257007348; 52°36′19″N 1°43′43″E | | 1246603 | Upload Photo | Q26539001 |
| 154, King Street | II | 154, King Street | | | 5 August 1974 | TG5254307396; 52°36′20″N 1°43′42″E | | 1246572 | Upload Photo | Q26538971 |
| 155, King Street | II | 155, King Street | | | 5 August 1974 | TG5253907404; 52°36′20″N 1°43′42″E | | 1246573 | Upload Photo | Q26538972 |
| 157 and 157a, King Street | II | 157 and 157a, King Street | | | 5 August 1974 | TG5253307414; 52°36′21″N 1°43′42″E | | 1246575 | Upload Photo | Q26538974 |
| 158, King Street | II | 158, King Street | | | 5 August 1974 | TG5252907419; 52°36′21″N 1°43′41″E | | 1246576 | Upload Photo | Q26538975 |
| 160, King Street | II | 160, King Street | | | 5 August 1974 | TG5252207429; 52°36′21″N 1°43′41″E | | 1246577 | Upload Photo | Q26538976 |
| 161, King Street | II | 161, King Street | | | 5 August 1974 | TG5251907435; 52°36′21″N 1°43′41″E | | 1246578 | Upload Photo | Q26538977 |
| Peggottys Public House | II | 162, King Street | pub | | 5 August 1974 | TG5251607443; 52°36′22″N 1°43′41″E | | 1246579 | Peggottys Public House More images | Q26538978 |
| Cannon Bollard at Junction with Row 116 | II | King Street | | | 26 February 1998 | TG5262607234; 52°36′15″N 1°43′46″E | | 1246580 | Upload Photo | Q26538979 |
| Credence House Including Area Railings | II | King Street | | | 27 June 1953 | TG5264507242; 52°36′15″N 1°43′47″E | | 1271273 | Upload Photo | Q26561241 |
| St Georges Theatre | I | King Street | theatre building | | 27 June 1953 | TG5261207348; 52°36′18″N 1°43′46″E | | 1245919 | St Georges Theatre More images | Q17536033 |
| Church of St John | II | Lancaster Road | church building | | 9 December 1976 | TG5298507172; 52°36′12″N 1°44′05″E | | 1271806 | Church of St John More images | Q26561714 |
| Roman Catholic Church of St Peter, Gorleston | II* | Lowestoft Road, Gorleston-on-sea, NR31 6SQ | church building | | 5 August 1974 | TG5262404123; 52°34′34″N 1°43′37″E | | 1246581 | Roman Catholic Church of St Peter, Gorleston More images | Q17554522 |
| Shrublands Youth and Community Centre | II | Magdalen Way, Southtown And Gorleston | | | 27 June 1953 | TG5179404086; 52°34′34″N 1°42′53″E | | 1246582 | Upload Photo | Q26538980 |
| The Nelson Hotel | II | 1, Marine Parade, NR30 3AG | hotel | | 27 June 1953 | TG5305206873; 52°36′02″N 1°44′08″E | | 1246583 | The Nelson Hotel More images | Q26538981 |
| Royal Hotel | II | 4, Marine Parade | hotel | | 5 August 1974 | TG5307006925; 52°36′04″N 1°44′09″E | | 1246584 | Royal Hotel More images | Q7374309 |
| Maritime Museum | II | 25, Marine Parade | | | 15 February 1990 | TG5307607201; 52°36′13″N 1°44′10″E | | 1246585 | Upload Photo | Q26538983 |
| Britannia Terrace | II | 47-66, Marine Parade | | | 2 August 1989 | TG5308507582; 52°36′25″N 1°44′11″E | | 1271548 | Upload Photo | Q26561490 |
| Barking Smack Public House | II | Marine Parade | pub | | 15 February 1990 | TG5306207059; 52°36′08″N 1°44′09″E | | 1271549 | Barking Smack Public House More images | Q26561491 |
| Empire Cinema | II | Marine Parade | movie theater | | 15 February 1990 | TG5306907497; 52°36′23″N 1°44′10″E | | 1271550 | Empire Cinema More images | Q26561492 |
| Rspca Drinking Trough | II | Marine Parade, Opposite Britannia Terrace | | | 6 September 2010 | TG5311307593; 52°36′26″N 1°44′13″E | | 1393959 | Upload Photo | Q26673093 |
| Windmill Cinema | II | Marine Parade | movie theater | | 5 August 1974 | TG5305406988; 52°36′06″N 1°44′08″E | | 1271551 | Windmill Cinema More images | Q26561493 |
| Two Necked Swan Public House | II | 6, Market Place | | | 5 August 1974 | TG5237807847; 52°36′35″N 1°43′35″E | | 1271552 | Upload Photo | Q26561494 |
| 7 and 8, Market Place | II | 7 and 8, Market Place | | | 5 August 1974 | TG5237507837; 52°36′35″N 1°43′34″E | | 1271553 | Upload Photo | Q26561495 |
| 13 and 14, Market Place | II | 13 and 14, Market Place | | | 5 August 1974 | TG5237707804; 52°36′34″N 1°43′34″E | | 1271554 | Upload Photo | Q26561496 |
| Market Tavern Public House | II | 17, Market Place | | | 26 February 1998 | TG5237307778; 52°36′33″N 1°43′34″E | | 1271555 | Market Tavern Public House More images | Q26561497 |
| 20, Market Place | II | 20, Market Place | | | 5 August 1974 | TG5238507757; 52°36′32″N 1°43′35″E | | 1271556 | Upload Photo | Q26561498 |
| 21, Market Place | II | 21, Market Place | | | 5 August 1974 | TG5238607751; 52°36′32″N 1°43′35″E | | 1271557 | Upload Photo | Q26561499 |
| 22 and 22a, Market Place | II | 22 and 22a, Market Place | | | 5 August 1974 | TG5238207741; 52°36′32″N 1°43′34″E | | 1271558 | Upload Photo | Q26561500 |
| 28, Market Place | II | 28, Market Place | | | 5 August 1974 | TG5239507694; 52°36′30″N 1°43′35″E | | 1271559 | Upload Photo | Q26561501 |
| 32 and 33, Market Place | II | 32 and 33, Market Place | | | 27 June 1953 | TG5240307669; 52°36′29″N 1°43′35″E | | 1271560 | Upload Photo | Q26561502 |
| 34 and 35, Market Place | II | 34 and 35, Market Place | | | 5 August 1974 | TG5240607659; 52°36′29″N 1°43′36″E | | 1271561 | Upload Photo | Q26561503 |
| 68, Market Place | II | 68, Market Place | | | 5 August 1974 | TG5244907842; 52°36′35″N 1°43′38″E | | 1246047 | Upload Photo | Q26538492 |
| 69, Market Place | II | 69, Market Place | | | 5 August 1974 | TG5244107849; 52°36′35″N 1°43′38″E | | 1246048 | Upload Photo | Q26538493 |
| 2, Howard Street North (see Details for Further Address Information) | II | 1 and 2, Market Row | | | 5 August 1974 | TG5228207678; 52°36′30″N 1°43′29″E | | 1246979 | Upload Photo | Q26539330 |
| 8, Market Row | II | 8, Market Row | | | 5 August 1974 | TG5231807678; 52°36′30″N 1°43′31″E | | 1246049 | Upload Photo | Q26538494 |
| 9 and 10, Market Row | II | 9 and 10, Market Row | | | 5 August 1974 | TG5232407676; 52°36′30″N 1°43′31″E | | 1246050 | Upload Photo | Q26538495 |
| 11 and 12, Market Row | II | 11 and 12, Market Row | | | 5 August 1974 | TG5233207677; 52°36′30″N 1°43′32″E | | 1246051 | Upload Photo | Q26538496 |
| 32, Market Row | II | 32, Market Row | | | 5 August 1974 | TG5234907666; 52°36′29″N 1°43′33″E | | 1246052 | Upload Photo | Q26538497 |
| 33 and 33a, Market Row | II | 33 and 33a, Market Row | | | 5 August 1974 | TG5234407664; 52°36′29″N 1°43′32″E | | 1246053 | Upload Photo | Q26538498 |
| 34, Market Row | II | 34, Market Row | | | 5 August 1974 | TG5233607661; 52°36′29″N 1°43′32″E | | 1246054 | Upload Photo | Q26538499 |
| 35 and 36, Market Row | II | 35 and 36, Market Row | | | 5 August 1974 | TG5232507665; 52°36′29″N 1°43′31″E | | 1246055 | Upload Photo | Q26538500 |
| 19 and 20, Middle Market Road | II | 19 and 20, Middle Market Road | | | 9 December 1976 | TG5262907736; 52°36′31″N 1°43′48″E | | 1246056 | Upload Photo | Q26538501 |
| Nelsons Monument | I | Monument Road | statue | | 27 June 1953 | TG5299905508; 52°35′18″N 1°44′01″E | | 1246057 | Nelsons Monument More images | Q4969287 |
| College of Art and Design Including Railings to East and North | II | Nelson Road | | | 26 June 1990 | TG5282307373; 52°36′19″N 1°43′57″E | | 1246058 | Upload Photo | Q26538502 |
| 41-46, Nelson Road South | II | 41-46, Nelson Road South | | | 27 June 1953 | TG5288906857; 52°36′02″N 1°43′59″E | | 1246059 | Upload Photo | Q26538503 |
| 51, North Quay | II | 51, North Quay | | | 1 June 1995 | TG5208207784; 52°36′33″N 1°43′19″E | | 1246060 | Upload Photo | Q26538504 |
| 55, North Quay | II | 55, North Quay | | | 9 December 1976 | TG5209007742; 52°36′32″N 1°43′19″E | | 1246061 | Upload Photo | Q26538505 |
| 56 and 57, North Quay | II | 56 and 57, North Quay | | | 21 November 1988 | TG5209307718; 52°36′31″N 1°43′19″E | | 1246002 | Upload Photo | Q26538453 |
| St Johns Head Public House | II | 58, North Quay | | | 9 December 1976 | TG5210807691; 52°36′30″N 1°43′20″E | | 1246003 | St Johns Head Public House More images | Q26538454 |
| 80, North Quay | II | 80, North Quay | | | 5 August 1974 | TG5205707862; 52°36′36″N 1°43′18″E | | 1246004 | Upload Photo | Q26538455 |
| 81 and 82, North Quay | II | 81 and 82, North Quay | | | 5 August 1974 | TG5206607877; 52°36′36″N 1°43′18″E | | 1246005 | Upload Photo | Q26538456 |
| 3, 4 and 5, Northgate Street | II | 3, 4 and 5, Northgate Street | | | 5 August 1974 | TG5233008034; 52°36′41″N 1°43′33″E | | 1246006 | Upload Photo | Q26538457 |
| 6, Northgate Street | II | 6, Northgate Street | | | 5 August 1974 | TG5232208037; 52°36′41″N 1°43′32″E | | 1246007 | Upload Photo | Q26538458 |
| 7, Northgate Street | II | 7, Northgate Street | | | 5 August 1974 | TG5231208036; 52°36′41″N 1°43′32″E | | 1246008 | Upload Photo | Q26538459 |
| White Horse Inn | II | 12 and 13, Northgate Street | | | 5 August 1974 | TG5230908069; 52°36′42″N 1°43′31″E | | 1246009 | White Horse Inn More images | Q26538460 |
| 14 and 15, Northgate Street | II | 14 and 15, Northgate Street | | | 5 August 1974 | TG5231808085; 52°36′43″N 1°43′32″E | | 1246010 | Upload Photo | Q26538461 |
| 16, 16a, 16b and 17, Northgate Street | II | 16, 16a, 16b and 17, Northgate Street | | | 5 August 1974 | TG5232908096; 52°36′43″N 1°43′33″E | | 1246011 | Upload Photo | Q26538462 |
| 18 and 19, Northgate Street | II | 18 and 19, Northgate Street | | | 5 August 1974 | TG5233208105; 52°36′43″N 1°43′33″E | | 1246012 | Upload Photo | Q26538463 |
| 20 and 20a, Northgate Street | II | 20 and 20a, Northgate Street | | | 26 February 1998 | TG5233808112; 52°36′44″N 1°43′33″E | | 1246013 | Upload Photo | Q26538464 |
| 220, 221 and 222, Northgate Street | II | 220, 221 and 222, Northgate Street | | | 5 August 1974 | TG5239308176; 52°36′46″N 1°43′36″E | | 1246014 | Upload Photo | Q26538465 |
| 224, Northgate Street | II | 224, Northgate Street | | | 26 February 1998 | TG5238708154; 52°36′45″N 1°43′36″E | | 1246015 | Upload Photo | Q26538466 |
| 225, 226 and 226a, Northgate Street | II | 225, 226 and 226a, Northgate Street | | | 26 February 1998 | TG5238508146; 52°36′45″N 1°43′36″E | | 1245975 | Upload Photo | Q26538433 |
| The Pavilion | II | Pavilion Road, Southtown And Gorleston | theatre building | | 31 October 1996 | TG5303103580; 52°34′16″N 1°43′57″E | | 1245976 | The Pavilion More images | Q5586596 |
| The Grove | II | 5, Pier Plain, Southtown And Gorleston | | | 27 June 1953 | TG5277204267; 52°34′39″N 1°43′46″E | | 1245977 | Upload Photo | Q26538435 |
| Beatsters Building | II | Pier Plain, (via 50 Pier Plain), Gorleston-on-sea | | | 6 September 2010 | TG5275404094; 52°34′33″N 1°43′44″E | | 1393960 | Upload Photo | Q26673094 |
| Churchyard Gates, Piers and Railings to Church of St Nicholas | II | Piers And Railings To Church Of St Nicholas, Church Plain | | | 26 February 1998 | TG5235408066; 52°36′42″N 1°43′34″E | | 1096814 | Upload Photo | Q26389079 |
| St Nicholas (priory) Middle School | I | Priory Row | | | 27 June 1953 | TG5246007985; 52°36′39″N 1°43′39″E | | 1245978 | Upload Photo | Q17536042 |
| Lighthouse | II | Quay Road, Southtown And Gorleston | lighthouse | | 5 August 1974 | TG5300203686; 52°34′20″N 1°43′56″E | | 1245979 | Lighthouse More images | Q5586590 |
| 9, Queen Street | II | 9, Queen Street | | | 26 February 1998 | TG5237007340; 52°36′19″N 1°43′33″E | | 1245980 | Upload Photo | Q26538437 |
| Church of St James | II | Queens Road | | | 5 August 1974 | TG5271606548; 52°35′52″N 1°43′49″E | | 1245981 | Upload Photo | Q26538438 |
| St Nicholas Hospital Cssd Store | II | Queens Road | | | 26 February 1998 | TG5277806286; 52°35′44″N 1°43′51″E | | 1245982 | Upload Photo | Q26538439 |
| St Nicholas Hospital Main Block | II* | Queens Road | architectural structure | | 5 August 1974 | TG5289006400; 52°35′47″N 1°43′58″E | | 1245983 | St Nicholas Hospital Main Block More images | Q17554508 |
| St Nicholas Hospital Main Entrance Range | II* | Queens Road | | | 5 August 1974 | TG5283506464; 52°35′50″N 1°43′55″E | | 1245984 | Upload Photo | Q17554517 |
| St Nicholas Hospital South Block | II | Queens Road | | | 5 August 1974 | TG5284706289; 52°35′44″N 1°43′55″E | | 1245985 | Upload Photo | Q26538440 |
| St Nicholas Hospital Walls and Railings | II | Queens Road | | | 26 February 1998 | TG5292606371; 52°35′46″N 1°44′00″E | | 1245986 | Upload Photo | Q26538441 |
| Regent Bingo Hall | II | 85-88, Regent Road | | | 21 October 1982 | TG5280307613; 52°36′27″N 1°43′56″E | | 1245987 | Upload Photo | Q26538442 |
| Church of St Mary Including Church Rooms and Surrounding Wall | II* | Regent Road | church building | | 9 December 1976 | TG5289607634; 52°36′27″N 1°44′01″E | | 1245910 | Church of St Mary Including Church Rooms and Surrounding Wall More images | Q15979419 |
| Presbytery Adjoining West of Church of St Mary | II | Regent Road, NR30 2AJ | | | 9 December 1976 | TG5286907629; 52°36′27″N 1°44′00″E | | 1245911 | Upload Photo | Q26538381 |
| 10-14, Regent Street | II | 10-14, Regent Street | | | 26 February 1998 | TG5237107515; 52°36′24″N 1°43′33″E | | 1245912 | Upload Photo | Q26538382 |
| Fastolff House | II | 30 and 31, Regent Street | | | 5 August 1974 | TG5239107502; 52°36′24″N 1°43′34″E | | 1245913 | Upload Photo | Q26538383 |
| Masonic Royal Assembly Rooms | II | South Beach Parade | | | 5 August 1974 | TG5300606732; 52°35′58″N 1°44′05″E | | 1271606 | Upload Photo | Q26561541 |
| Shadingfield Lodge | II | South Beach Parade | | | 5 August 1974 | TG5303406684; 52°35′56″N 1°44′06″E | | 1271607 | Upload Photo | Q26561542 |
| The Scenic Railway Roller Coaster at Great Yarmouth Pleasure Beach | II | South Beach Parade, NR30 3EH | | | 18 October 2016 | TG5313706001; 52°35′34″N 1°44′10″E | | 1436976 | Upload Photo | Q66477752 |
| The Winter Gardens | II* | South Beach Parade | theatre building | | 5 August 1974 | TG5314806762; 52°35′59″N 1°44′12″E | | 1271608 | The Winter Gardens More images | Q17554545 |
| 1, 2 and 2b, South Quay | II | 1, 2 and 2b, South Quay | | | 27 June 1953 | TG5233007372; 52°36′20″N 1°43′31″E | | 1271609 | Upload Photo | Q26561543 |
| 3, South Quay | II | 3, South Quay | | | 27 June 1953 | TG5233607364; 52°36′19″N 1°43′31″E | | 1271610 | Upload Photo | Q26561544 |
| 4, South Quay | I | 4, South Quay | building | | 27 June 1953 | TG5235207360; 52°36′19″N 1°43′32″E | | 1271611 | 4, South Quay More images | Q17536051 |
| 5, South Quay | II | 5, South Quay | | | 27 June 1953 | TG5234707343; 52°36′19″N 1°43′32″E | | 1271612 | Upload Photo | Q26561545 |
| 6, South Quay | II | 6, South Quay | | | 27 June 1953 | TG5235307337; 52°36′19″N 1°43′32″E | | 1271613 | Upload Photo | Q26561546 |
| 7 and 8, South Quay | II | 7 and 8, South Quay | | | 27 June 1953 | TG5235507328; 52°36′18″N 1°43′32″E | | 1271614 | Upload Photo | Q26561547 |
| 10, South Quay | II | 10, South Quay | | | 5 August 1974 | TG5236807305; 52°36′17″N 1°43′33″E | | 1271615 | Upload Photo | Q26561548 |
| 11, South Quay | II | 11, South Quay | | | 5 August 1974 | TG5237207301; 52°36′17″N 1°43′33″E | | 1271616 | Upload Photo | Q26561549 |
| 12, South Quay | II | 12, South Quay | | | 5 August 1974 | TG5237507295; 52°36′17″N 1°43′33″E | | 1271617 | Upload Photo | Q26561550 |
| 13 and 14, South Quay | II | 13 and 14, South Quay | | | 27 June 1953 | TG5238507292; 52°36′17″N 1°43′33″E | | 1271618 | Upload Photo | Q26561551 |
| 16, South Quay | II | 16, South Quay | | | 26 February 1998 | TG5239107270; 52°36′16″N 1°43′34″E | | 1245798 | Upload Photo | Q26538290 |
| 17, South Quay | II | 17, South Quay | | | 27 June 1953 | TG5239407261; 52°36′16″N 1°43′34″E | | 1245799 | Upload Photo | Q26538291 |
| Custom House | II* | 20, South Quay | house | | 5 August 1974 | TG5240607236; 52°36′15″N 1°43′34″E | | 1245800 | Custom House More images | Q17554492 |
| Port and Haven Commissioners' Offices | II | 21, South Quay, NR30 2RG | | | 5 August 1974 | TG5241107225; 52°36′15″N 1°43′35″E | | 1245801 | Upload Photo | Q26538292 |
| 23 and 24, South Quay | II | 23 and 24, South Quay | | | 27 June 1953 | TG5241807203; 52°36′14″N 1°43′35″E | | 1245802 | Upload Photo | Q26538293 |
| 25, South Quay | II* | 25, South Quay | building | | 27 June 1953 | TG5242607188; 52°36′14″N 1°43′35″E | | 1245803 | 25, South Quay More images | Q17554499 |
| 26 and 27, South Quay | II | 26 and 27, South Quay | | | 5 August 1974 | TG5243407180; 52°36′13″N 1°43′36″E | | 1245804 | Upload Photo | Q26538294 |
| 31, Southtown Road | II | 31, Southtown Road, Southtown And Gorleston | | | 5 August 1974 | TG5211107088; 52°36′11″N 1°43′18″E | | 1245805 | Upload Photo | Q26538295 |
| 32, Southtown Road | II | 32, Southtown Road, Southtown And Gorlestown | | | 5 August 1974 | TG5211307078; 52°36′11″N 1°43′18″E | | 1245806 | Upload Photo | Q26538296 |
| 83 and 84, Southtown Road | II | 83 and 84, Southtown Road, Southtown And Gorleston | | | 27 June 1953 | TG5233506488; 52°35′51″N 1°43′29″E | | 1245809 | Upload Photo | Q26538299 |
| 244, Southtown Road | II | 244, Southtown Road, Southtown And Gorleston | | | 5 August 1974 | TG5228106806; 52°36′02″N 1°43′27″E | | 1245810 | Upload Photo | Q26538300 |
| 245, Southtown Road | II | 245, Southtown Road, Southtown And Gorleston | | | 27 June 1953 | TG5228006827; 52°36′02″N 1°43′27″E | | 1245815 | Upload Photo | Q26538305 |
| 271-277, Southtown Road | II | 271-277, Southtown Road, Southtown And Gorleston | | | 5 August 1974 | TG5215207114; 52°36′12″N 1°43′21″E | | 1245816 | Upload Photo | Q26538306 |
| 244b, Southtown Road | II | 244b, Southtown Road, Southtown And Gorleston | | | 27 June 1953 | TG5231406828; 52°36′02″N 1°43′28″E | | 1245814 | Upload Photo | Q26538304 |
| Boundary Wall to North of Number 67 (number 67 Not Included) | II | Southtown Road, Southtown And Gorleston | | | 5 August 1974 | TG5220106794; 52°36′01″N 1°43′22″E | | 1245808 | Upload Photo | Q26538298 |
| Boundary Wall to South of Number 66 (number 66 Not Included) | II | Southtown Road, Southtown And Gorleston | | | 5 August 1974 | TG5220106797; 52°36′01″N 1°43′22″E | | 1245807 | Upload Photo | Q26538297 |
| Church of St Mary | II | Southtown Road, Southtown And Gorleston | church building | | 27 June 1953 | TG5214607165; 52°36′13″N 1°43′20″E | | 1245817 | Church of St Mary More images | Q26538307 |
| Utility Block Immediately East of No.244a | II | Southtown Road, Southtown And Gorleston | | | 5 August 1974 | TG5231306850; 52°36′03″N 1°43′28″E | | 1393268 | Upload Photo | Q26538302 |
| Utility Block Immediately East of Number 244a | II | Southtown Road, Southtown And Gorleston | | | 5 August 1974 | TG5231306850; 52°36′03″N 1°43′28″E | | 1245812 | Upload Photo | Q26538302 |
| Workshop Range N of No. 244a | II | Southtown Road, Southtown And Gorleston | | | 5 August 1974 | TG5230306872; 52°36′04″N 1°43′28″E | | 1245811 | Upload Photo | Q26538301 |
| Workshop Range North of Number 244a | II | Southtown Road, Southtown And Gorleston | | | 5 August 1974 | TG5230306872; 52°36′04″N 1°43′28″E | | 1245813 | Upload Photo | Q26538301 |
| World War I Memorial Including Gate and Gate Piers | II | St George's Park | war memorial | | 6 September 2010 | TG5267907440; 52°36′21″N 1°43′49″E | | 1393957 | World War I Memorial Including Gate and Gate Piers More images | Q26673091 |
| 1, 2 and 3, St Georges Plain | II | 1, 2 and 3, St Georges Plain | | | 5 August 1974 | TG5263807289; 52°36′17″N 1°43′47″E | | 1245918 | Upload Photo | Q26538386 |
| 82 and 83, St George's Road | II | 82 and 83, St Georges Road | | | 5 August 1974 | TG5272707335; 52°36′18″N 1°43′52″E | | 1245920 | Upload Photo | Q26538387 |
| Red Fleet House | II | 86, St Georges Road | | | 5 August 1974 | TG5270307347; 52°36′18″N 1°43′50″E | | 1245921 | Upload Photo | Q26538388 |
| The Hippodrome | II* | St Georges Road | theatre building | | 8 December 1978 | TG5303507113; 52°36′10″N 1°44′07″E | | 1245922 | The Hippodrome More images | Q17554506 |
| Ocean Lodge Hotel | II | 51, St Nicholas Road | | | 27 June 1953 | TG5277407885; 52°36′36″N 1°43′56″E | | 1271605 | Upload Photo | Q26561540 |
| Shipley Veterinary Surgery | II | Steam Mill Lane | | | 26 February 1998 | TG5208907483; 52°36′24″N 1°43′18″E | | 1245554 | Upload Photo | Q26538074 |
| Presbytery of St Peter's Church, Gorleston | II | Sussex Road, Gorleston, NR31 6PF | | | 7 November 2022 | TG5264504133; 52°34′35″N 1°43′39″E | | 1481895 | Upload Photo | Q122213868 |
| 1-4, Swirles Place | II | 1-4, Swirles Place | | | 9 December 1976 | TG5262907747; 52°36′31″N 1°43′48″E | | 1245555 | Upload Photo | Q26538075 |
| 9 and 11, Tolhouse Street | II | 9 and 11, Tolhouse Street | | | 5 August 1974 | TG5250607241; 52°36′15″N 1°43′40″E | | 1245556 | Upload Photo | Q26538076 |
| 13, Tolhouse Street | II | 13, Tolhouse Street | | | 5 August 1974 | TG5251107235; 52°36′15″N 1°43′40″E | | 1245557 | Upload Photo | Q26538077 |
| 15, Tolhouse Street | II | 15, Tolhouse Street | | | 5 August 1974 | TG5251507230; 52°36′15″N 1°43′40″E | | 1245558 | Upload Photo | Q26538078 |
| 17 and 19, Tolhouse Street | II | 17 and 19, Tolhouse Street | | | 5 August 1974 | TG5251707225; 52°36′15″N 1°43′40″E | | 1245559 | Upload Photo | Q26538079 |
| The Tolhouse | I | Tolhouse Street | museum | | 27 June 1953 | TG5249607253; 52°36′16″N 1°43′39″E | | 1245560 | The Tolhouse More images | Q17536024 |
| Great Yarmouth Potteries | II* | Trinity Place, NR30 3HA | | | 9 December 1976 | TG5272606901; 52°36′04″N 1°43′50″E | | 1245561 | Upload Photo | Q17554486 |
| Vauxhall Bridge | II | Vauxhall Bridge Road | bridge | | 26 February 1998 | TG5207508028; 52°36′41″N 1°43′19″E | | 1245562 | Vauxhall Bridge More images | Q26538080 |
| Far East Prisoner of War, War Memorial | II | War Memorial, Marine Parade, Opposite Portland Place | timepiece | | 6 September 2010 | TG5311507053; 52°36′08″N 1°44′11″E | | 1393958 | Far East Prisoner of War, War Memorial More images | Q26673092 |
| 3, 4 and 5, Waterloo Road | II | 3, 4 and 5, Waterloo Road | | | 5 August 1974 | TG5303606899; 52°36′03″N 1°44′07″E | | 1245563 | Upload Photo | Q26538081 |
| Grandstand at Wellesley Recreation Ground | II | Wellesley Road | | | 2 May 2000 | TG5309808202; 52°36′45″N 1°44′14″E | | 1380279 | Upload Photo | Q26660489 |
| Tennis Pavilion at Wellesley Recreation Ground | II | Wellesley Road | | | 2 May 2000 | TG5302408055; 52°36′41″N 1°44′09″E | | 1380280 | Upload Photo | Q26660490 |
| Ticket Office at Wellesley Recreation Ground | II | Wellesley Road | | | 2 May 2000 | TG5297808054; 52°36′41″N 1°44′07″E | | 1380281 | Upload Photo | Q26660491 |
| 11-16, Wellington Road | II | 11-16, Wellington Road | | | 5 August 1974 | TG5300806909; 52°36′04″N 1°44′05″E | | 1245564 | Upload Photo | Q26538082 |
| 20, Wellington Road | II | 20, Wellington Road | | | 26 June 1990 | TG5301206976; 52°36′06″N 1°44′06″E | | 1245565 | Upload Photo | Q26538083 |
| Wellington Arch | II | Wellington Road | | | 5 August 1974 | TG5302106885; 52°36′03″N 1°44′06″E | | 1245566 | Upload Photo | Q26538084 |
| Wellington Mews Arch | II | Wellington Road | | | 5 August 1974 | TG5301606832; 52°36′01″N 1°44′06″E | | 1271805 | Upload Photo | Q26561713 |
| York Road Centre (former Drill Hall) | II | York Road | | | 23 February 2010 | TG5270707236; 52°36′15″N 1°43′50″E | | 1393653 | Upload Photo | Q26672803 |

== See also ==
- Grade I listed buildings in Norfolk
- Grade II* listed buildings in Norfolk

== Sources ==
- Wilson, Bill; Pevsner, Nikolaus (1997) [1962], Norfolk 1: Norwich and North-East, The Buildings of England, New Haven and London: Yale University Press, ISBN 978-0-300-09607-1
