= Breydon Viaduct =

Bridge in United Kingdom

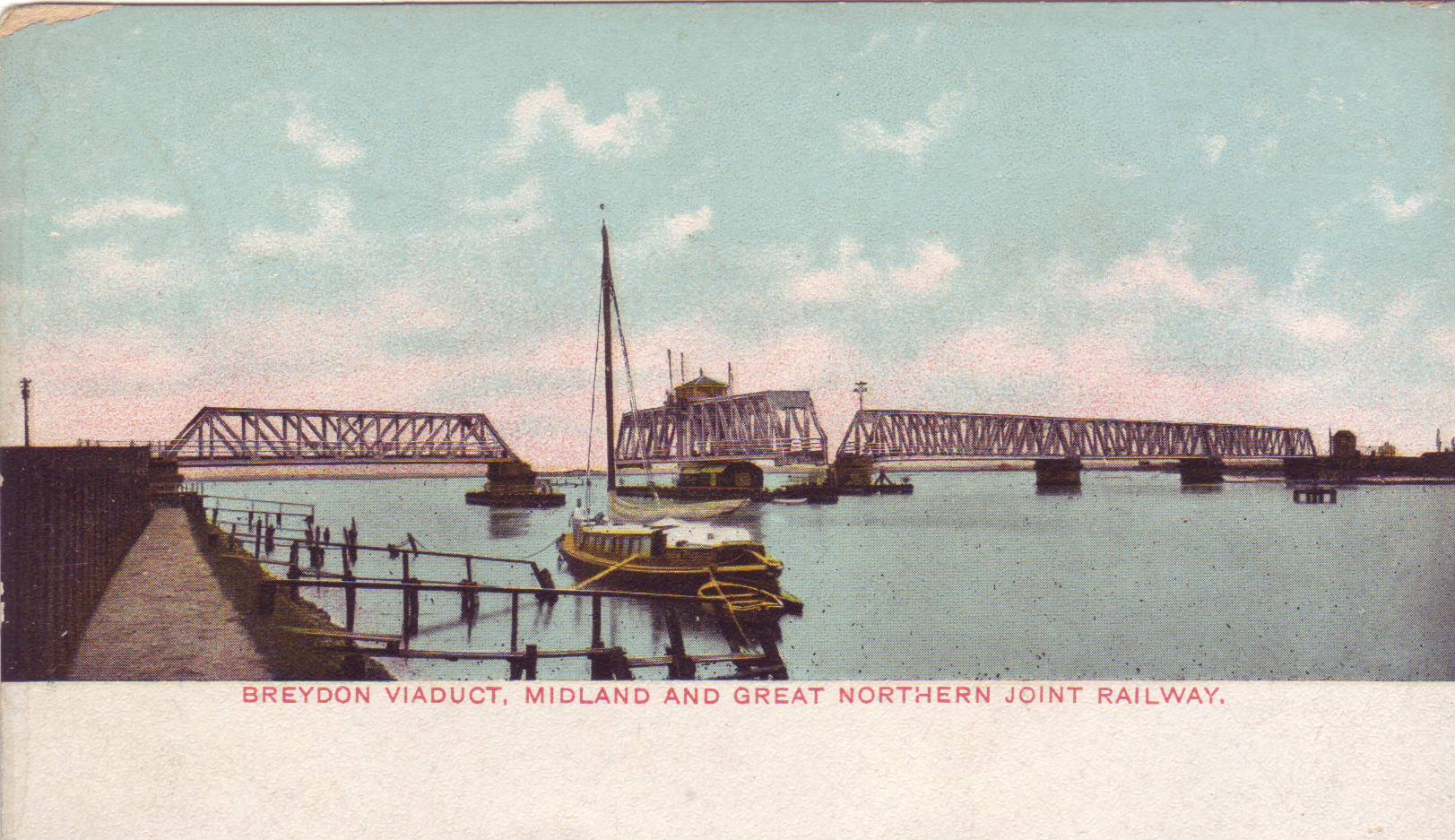
- Postcard from the early 1900s
- Coordinates: 52.6118°N 1.7158°E
- Crosses: River Yare
- Locale: Great Yarmouth, Norfolk, England.

Characteristics
- Design: truss swing bridge
- Material: Steel
- Total length: 800 feet (240 m)
- No. of spans: 5
- Piers in water: 5

History
- Designer: William E. Newman
- Construction start: 1899
- Construction end: 1903
- Closed: 21 September 1953

Breydon Viaduct was a railway bridge across the River Yare near Great Yarmouth, Norfolk, England, that was built by the Midland and Great Northern Joint Railway (M&GN).

== History ==
Breydon Viaduct was built to cross the River Yare just downstream of Breydon Water and hence connect Yarmouth Beach station to the Norfolk and Suffolk Joint Railway line from Yarmouth South Town railway station. By doing so it gave passengers from the Midlands a direct link to Lowestoft. The Engineer-in-Chief of the work was Alexander Ross, the Chief Engineer of the Great Northern Railway. William E. Newman provided the mechanical and structural design and William Marriott acted as executive engineer. The bridge was 800 ft (240 m) long and consisted of five spans. The second span from the south rotated about its midpoint in the manner of a swing bridge to leave two 60 ft (18 m) passages for river traffic. This section sat on a cast iron pivot which used 2 in (51 mm) ball bearings which made the bridge so free running that it could be manually opened by just one person.

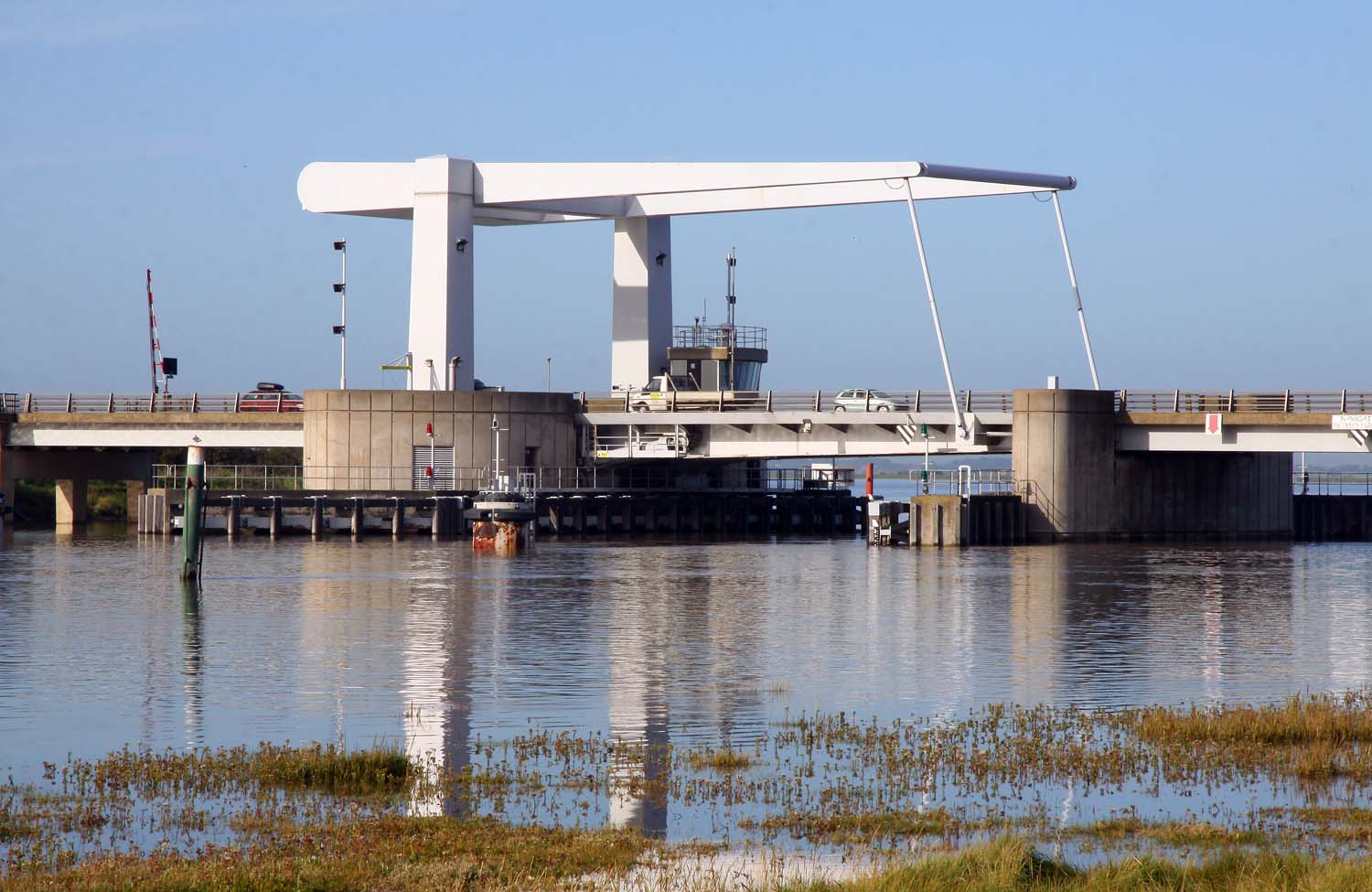
Breydon Road Bridge

Work on the bridge began in 1899 and it was finished in 1903 at a total cost of £38,453. (equivalent to £5,215,631 in 2023), It was the largest structure on the Midland and Great Northern Joint Railway. The bridge was successfully weight tested on 8 July 1903 with a train of heavy engines and it was opened shortly after. The bridge was single track whilst the rest of the line was double track and so signal boxes were provided at each end. River traffic on the Yare had priority over trains that wished to use the bridge. The viaduct closed on 21 September 1953 prior to the rest of the MG&N line. The tracks over the bridge remained in place for several years afterwards before the bridge was finally demolished in 1962. At the time of its closure it was anticipated that major repairs would be required to keep it in service, although it was found to be in good condition when it was demolished. The closure left Yarmouth Beach station a terminus until it was closed in 1959. After its demolition the pilings remained in the river until the construction of Breydon Road Bridge in the late 1980s when they were removed. The new road bridge followed the alignment of the rail viaduct and was a drawbridge which could open completely in 90 seconds; the rail bridge could take up to ten minutes to open in strong winds.
