= Berney Arms Windmill =

Windmill in Norfolk, England

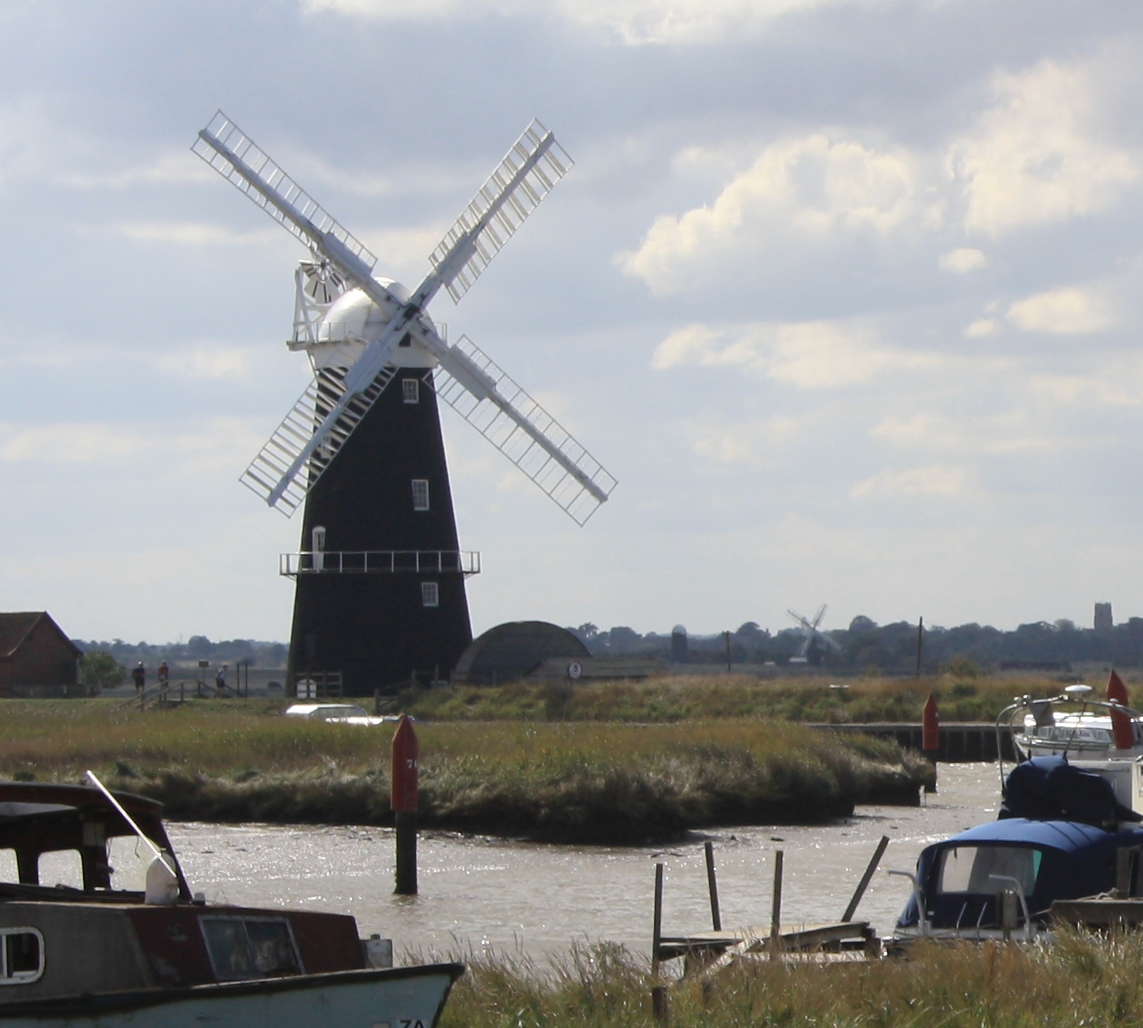
- Berney Arms Windmill with Polkey's Mill in the background, September 2009.
- Interactive map of Berney Arms Windmill

Origin
- Mill name: High Mill
- Mill location: Reedham, Broadland, Norfolk, England
- Grid reference: TG 4652 0496
- Coordinates: 52°35′12″N 1°38′16″E
- Operator: English Heritage
- Year built: 1865

Information
- Purpose: Cement mill and drainage mill
- Type: Tower mill
- Storeys: Seven storeys
- No. of sails: Four
- Type of sails: Patent sails
- Windshaft: Cast iron
- Winding: Fantail
- Fantail blades: Eight
- Type of pump: Scoopwheel
- Scoopwheel diameter: 24 feet 0 inches (7.32 m)

Berney Arms Windmill is a tower mill located at Berney Arms alongside the River Yare at the south-western end of Breydon Water in the English county of Norfolk. The windmill is in an isolated spot in The Broads around 3.5 miles (5.6 km) north-east of the village of Reedham and 4 miles (6.4 km) south-west of Great Yarmouth. The mill has no road access but can be accessed by boat, by foot or from Berney Arms railway station. It is a scheduled monument under the care of English Heritage.

== History ==
The first mill on this site was marked on Faden's 1797 map of Norfolk as a drainage mill. It was later also a cement and saw mill. A 10hp steam engine was used as auxiliary power. It was recorded as a cement mill in 1821, producing Roman cement. In 1828, the mill was driving seven circular saws and a vertical saw. By 1847, the steam engine had been uprated to 12hp. In 1860, the mill was being used in the production of Portland cement. The mill was demolished in 1865 and replaced by a new windmill.

The ne windmill was built in 1865 for the Reedham Cement Company by the millwright firm of Stolworthy of Great Yarmouth. on the site of a previous mill. It was initially used to grind cement clinker, using chalk from Whitlingham near Norwich and clay dredged from Oulton Broad or Breydon Water, both brought to the mill by wherry. These materials were fired at nearby kilns. The kilns produced a clinker which was ground to a powder in the windmill. At this time the cement works supported a small settlement with 11 inhabited houses and a chapel.

Cement production closed down in 1880 and in 1883 the windmill was converted into a drainage mill to drain the surrounding marshland. The mill closed in 1948 when it was replaced by motor pumps. It was given to the Ministry of Works by the Lower Bure, Halvergate Fleet and Acle Marshes Internal Drainage Board in 1951. In February 1962, the sails were damaged in a gale. They were repaired by T. Smithdale & Sons, millwrights of Acle. This was the last millwrighting done by Smithdale's. Cecil Smithdale retired on completion of the work and shut the firm down.

== The windmill today ==
The windmill is a scheduled monument under the care of English Heritage. It underwent a lengthy restoration programme starting in 1999 when the sails were removed along with the cap and fantail. After a long period without them the cap was replaced during 2003, the fantail on 22 April 2006 and finally the sails on 25 May 2007. During the Summer of 2009 English Heritage, in partnership with a local boat touring company, re-opened the mill on a limited basis on a number of Mondays. It is now only open to pre-booked group tours. RSPB volunteers, on behalf of English Heritage, have opened the mill on the last Sunday of each month during 2016 and intend to do so in coming years during the summer months.

The mill is currently closed to the public for major restoration to bring it to full working order.

== Description ==
The first mill was a five storey tower mill. It had four Patent sails. The mill drove a cement mill, seven circular saws and a vertical saw. A steam engine provided auxiliary power. Although the method of drainage is not recorded, it is likely to have been a scoopwheel.

High Mill is 70 feet (21 m) tall and is the tallest drainage windmill in Norfolk. It is constructed from red brickwork with the outside sloping walls coated with tar. The mill tower stands seven storeys high. The cap resembles an upturned clinker boat hull and is a traditional style for Norfolk. The windmill has four Patent sails and a fantail. The sails have 10 bays of three shutters. They span 80 feet (24 m). The cap runs on a shot curb. The clasp arme woodenbrake wheel is 8 feet 0 inches (2.44 m) diameter. it drives a cast iron wallower at the top of the upright shaft. The upright shaft is composed of six sections. At the bottom, a pair of mitre wheels drive the scoopwheel. The mill's 24 feet 0 inches (7.32 m) diameter scoopwheel stands some way from the mill, which is unusual. The paddles of the scoopwheel are 11 inches (280 mm) wide. The scoopwheel is linked to the mill by a horizontal shaft and has a length of 24 feet (7.3 m). It discharged into the River Yare.
