= Halvergate Marshes =

Grazing marsh area in Norfolk, England

- Site of Special Scientific Interest
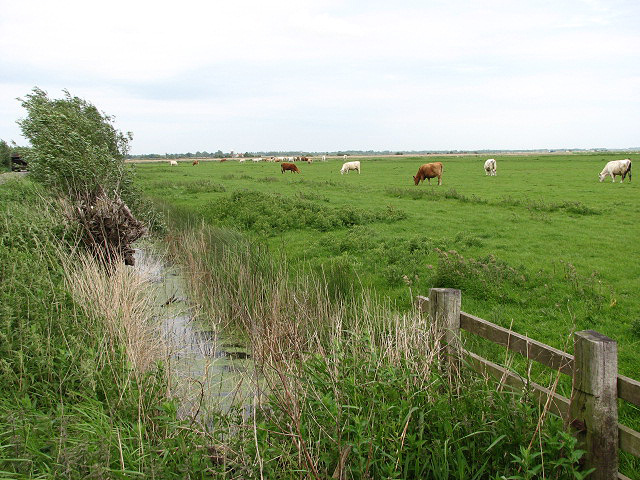

- Halvergate Marshes within Norfolk
- Location of Halvergate Marshes.
- Area of search: Norfolk
- Grid reference: TG450050
- Coordinates: 52.588°N 1.615°E
- Interest: Biological
- Area: 1,430.13 hectares (14.30 km^{2}; 5.52 sq mi)
- Notification date: 1995

The Halvergate Marshes are an area of grazing marsh in the east of the English county of Norfolk. They form part of the area of The Broads and lie between the River Bure and the River Yare, bordering Breydon Water on the east. The marshes cover an area of around 2,642 hectares (26.42 km^{2}; 6,528.52 acres). An area of 1,432.7 hectares (3,540 acres) is a biological Site of Special Scientific Interest. Some areas are also in the Breydon Water Local Nature Reserve, the Broadland and Breydon Water Ramsar sites, The Broads Special Area of Conservation, and The Broads and Breydon Water Special Protection Areas.

== History ==
Halvergate Marshes were an estuary in Roman times and remained a tidal creek into the medieval period. By the time of Domesday Book the land was already being used for grazing sheep, with Halvergate being recorded as having 960 sheep at the time, a larger amount than any other part of the marshes. Some evidence of possible salt workings also remains. Around 400 years ago the land was drained and converted to grazing marsh using a series of windpumps or windmills and drainage ditches. It was used mainly to graze sheep and cattle, although was occasionally farmed as arable land until coastal flooding in the 1780s.

Arable ploughing in the 1960s and 70s damaged the ditch landscape and ecology and in the 1980s further draining was undertaken. This led to the loss of wildlife habitat and in 1981 an area 1,430 hectares (3,500 acres) in size was designated as a Site of Special Scientific Interest. In 1985 the Broads Authority, Ministry of Agriculture, Fisheries and Food and Countryside Commission developed the Broads Grazing Marsh Conservation Scheme, a series of financial incentives to persuade farmers to adopt more environmentally friendly methods on Halvergate Marshes. This led to the creation of the UK's first Environmentally Sensitive Area on Halvergate Marshes in 1987 and was the prototype for ESAs nationally.

The marshes are dotted with windpumps, many without sails or even caps. These structures were used for draining the marshes before the introduction of motor or diesel pumps. Among the best preserved are Stracey Arms Mill on the River Bure, Lockgate Mill, Mutton's Mill and the Berney Arms Windmill, a Scheduled Ancient Monument on the River Yare.

== Geography ==
Halvergate Marshes is the largest area of traditionally managed grazing marsh in the Broadland area. The area is extremely flat and low lying with much of the area at or below sea level. Breydon Water forms the eastern edge of the marshes with the River Yare dividing the area from similar areas of marshland to the south. The villages of Reedham, Wickhampton and Halvergate and the higher ground they occupy forms the western edge of the marshes, with the market town of Acle at the extreme north-west. The River Bure and the Acle Straight road form the northern edge. The area of the Site of Special Scientific Interest forms part of the wider marshland area and is mainly located to the south of the Halvergate Fleet waterway and the village of Halvergate. Areas of marshland extend outside of the Halvergate Marshes both to the north and the south.

The area is sparsely populated with a scattering of isolated farms across the marshes, although it may have been more populated in the Medieval period. Berney Arms is the site of Berney Arms railway station, one of the most isolated railway stations in England, and at one point had up to 11 inhabited houses. The RSPB Berney Marshes reserve forms part of the area. The area is crossed by the Weavers' Way and Wherryman's Way footpaths.

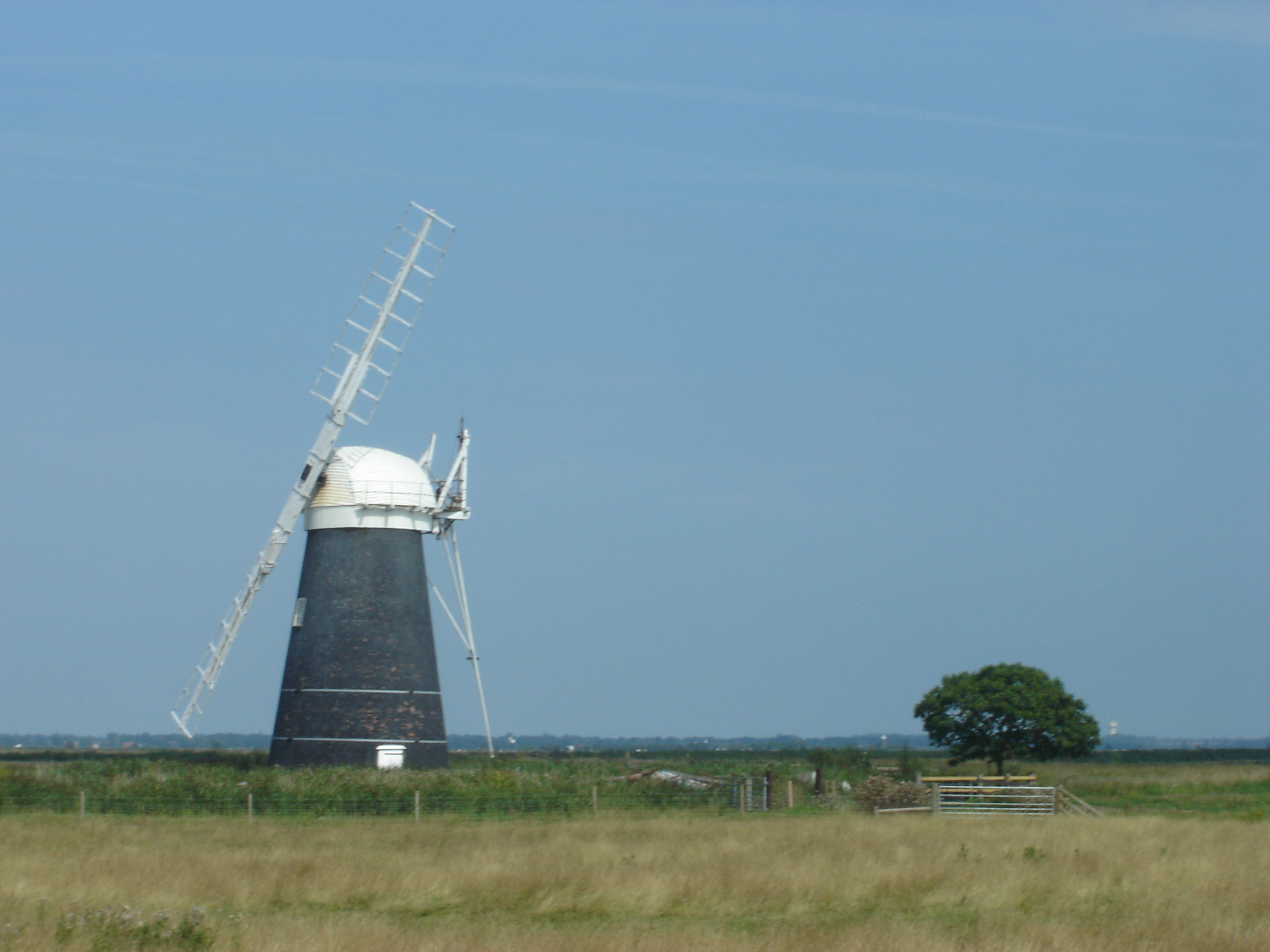
Muttons Mill, partially restored and located on the Halvergate Marshes

== Flora and fauna ==
Halvergate Marshes support a range of habitats besides grazing marsh, including areas of unimproved pasture, wet fen meadow, reed bed and alder carr. A band of woodland lies along the western edge of the marshes. The drainage ditches which cross the marshes are deemed to be of "outstanding importance for nature conservation" and support a range of freshwater and brackish communities of plants and invertebrates.

Freshwater ditch communities, which lie mainly along the western side of the SSSI area, are recognised as being of "being of international importance" and support species such as broad-leaved pondweed Potamogeton natans, water violet Hottonia palustris and the nationally scarce whorled water milfoil Myriophyllum verticillatum. Other areas of ditches support species such as the nationally scarce water soldier Stratiotes alludes, fen pondweed Potamogeton coloratus, hairlike pondweed Potamogeton trichoides and water parsnip Sium latifolium. The area of ditch close to Breydon Water are more brackish in nature and feature species such as soft hornwort Ceratophyllum submersum and the nationally scarce stiff saltmarsh grass Puccinellia rupestris.

Invertebrate species associated with the drainage ditches include the nationally rare species Norfolk hawker dragonfly Aeshna isosceles, the great silver water-beetle Hydrophilus piceus and a large hoverfly Lejops vittatus.

Birds typically found on Halvergate Marshes include both wintering species such as Bewick's swan, golden plover and lapwing as well as breeding species such as ruff, gadwall and shoveler. The Bewick's swan population is considered to be internationally important. The marshes and nearby Breydon Water are an important migration point for a range of bird species in the autumn.

== Management ==
The Royal Society for the Protection of Birds takes a leading role in management on the marshes, working alongside other environmental bodies such as Natural England, Norfolk Wildlife Trust and the Broads Authority. Farmers work in collaboration with environmental management agencies, for example to reinstate drainage ditches and dykes to support biodiversity on the marshes.
