= Breydon Bridge =

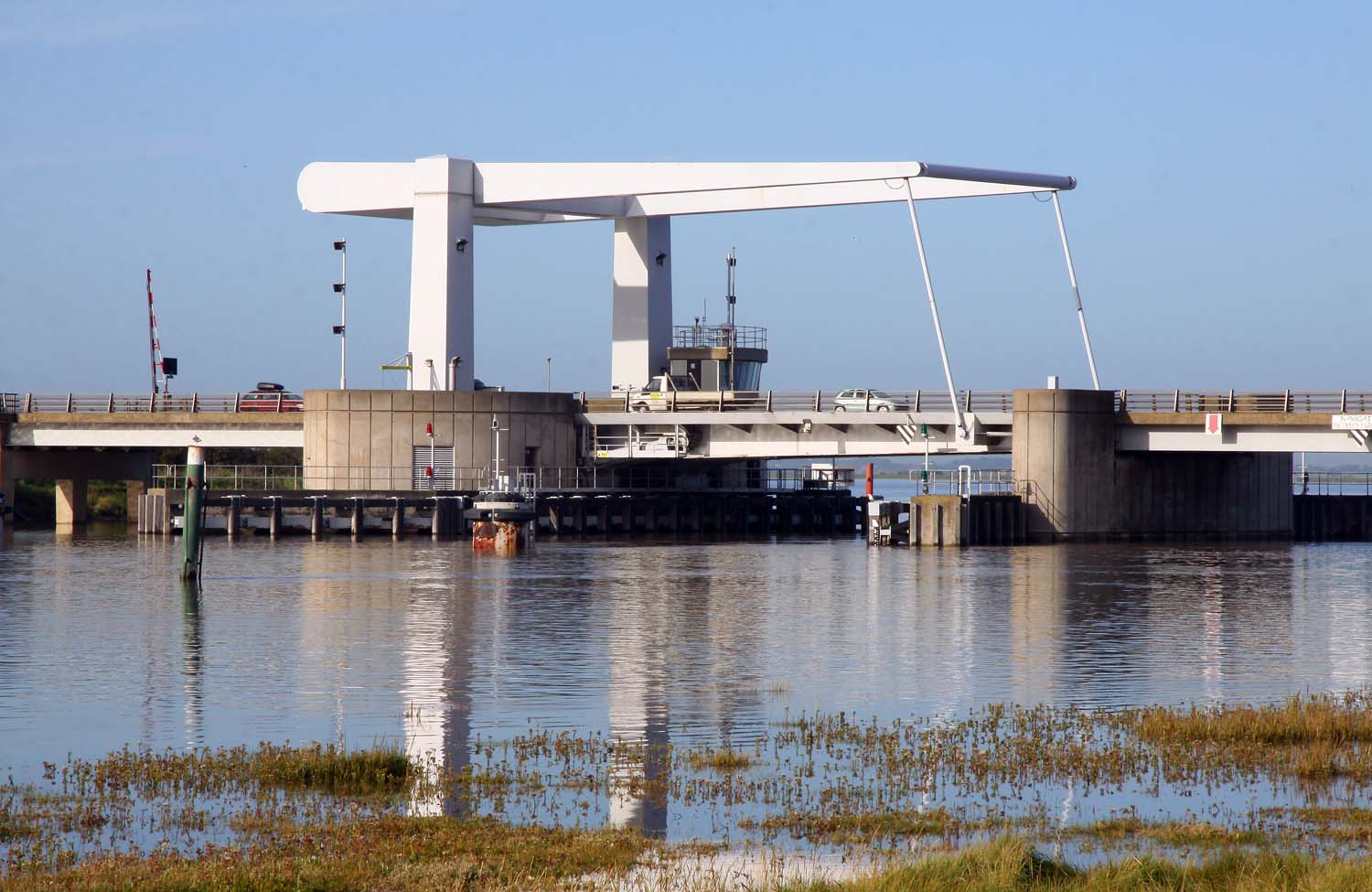
- Coordinates: 52.6120°N 1.7156°E
- Carries: Single Laned A47
- Crosses: River Yare
- Locale: Great Yarmouth, Norfolk
- Official name: Breydon bridge

History
- Opened: 1985

Location
- Interactive map of Breydon Bridge

The Breydon Bridge is a single-span drawbridge carrying the A47 Great Yarmouth bypass across the River Yare close to Breydon Water. It follows the route of the former railway Breydon Viaduct which was closed in 1953 and was demolished by 1963. Completed in 1985, an average of 31,000 vehicles cross the bridge each day.

When built in 1985, the bridge was allocated the road number A12, which ran from London to Great Yarmouth via Lowestoft and Ipswich/A14. In February 2017, the A12 from Great Yarmouth to Lowestoft was reallocated the number A47 as a Southern extension of the latter road. This left the Breydon Bridge carrying the number A47 which continues to Lowestoft before terminating at the Gull Wing Bridge, where it then links to the A12.
