= Coston Fen, Runhall =

Protected area in Norfolk, England

Coordinates: 52.618°N 1.043°E

- Site of Special Scientific Interest
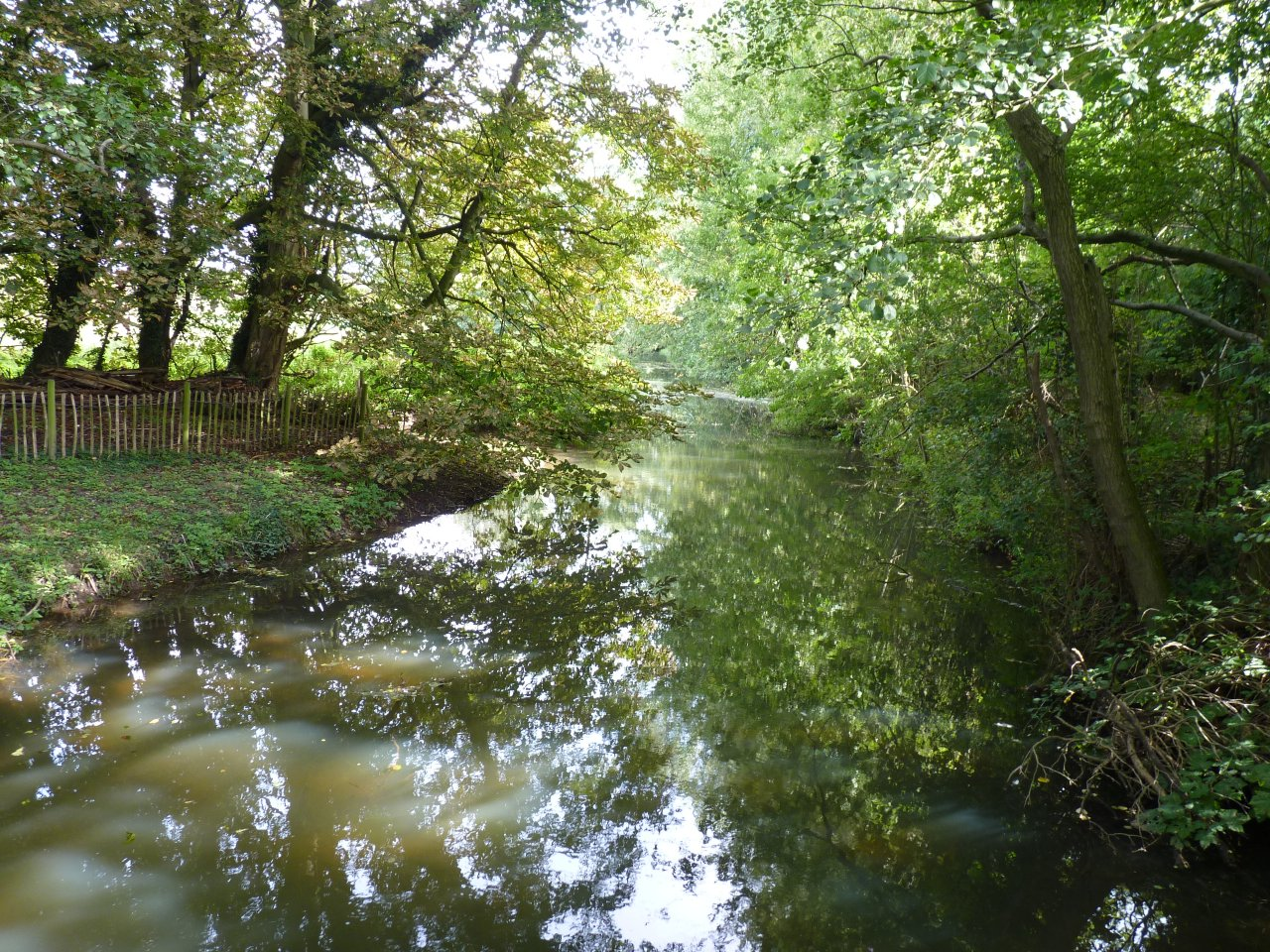
- Location of Coston Fen, Runhall.
- Area of search: Norfolk
- Grid reference: TG 061 066
- Interest: Biological
- Area: 7.1 hectares (18 acres)
- Notification date: 1992
- Location map: Magic Map

Coston Fen, Runhall is a 7.1-hectare (18-acre) biological Site of Special Scientific Interest between Dereham and Wymondham in Norfolk, England. It is part of the Norfolk Valley Fens Special Area of Conservation.

This spring-fed site in the Yare valley has a variety of fen habitats, including a nationally rare calcareous mire community of fen flora. There are also areas of tall herbs, scrub and improved pasture.

The site is private land with no public access.
