= Alexander Ross (engineer) =

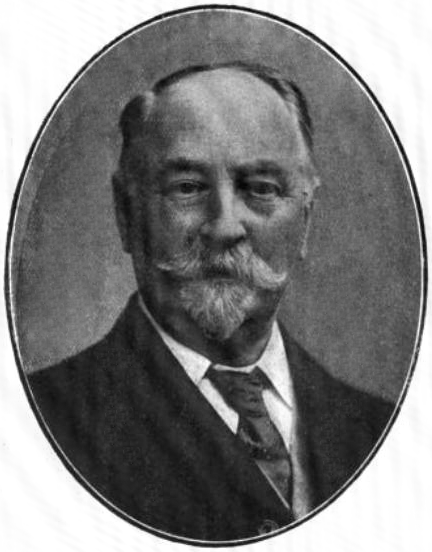
- Born: 20 April 1845; Laggan, County of Inverness, Scotland
- Died: 3 February 1923 (aged 77); London, England
- Engineering career
- Discipline: Civil,
- Institutions: Institution of Civil Engineers (president)

Alexander Ross (20 April 1845 – 3 February 1923) was a British civil engineer particularly noted for his work with the railway industry.

== Biography ==
Ross was born in Laggan, County of Inverness in Scotland on 20 April 1845. He was educated in Aberdeen and at Owen's College in Manchester, an institution now a part of the University of Manchester. Ross began his career in railway engineering with the Great North of Scotland Railway (GNSR) before moving to the London and North Western Railway (LNWR) in 1871. In 1873 he went to work for the North Eastern Railway (NER) before returning to LNWR in the next year. He changed employer again in 1884 when he went to work for the Lancashire and Yorkshire Railway (LYR) before becoming the Chief Engineer of the Manchester, Sheffield and Lincolnshire Railway (MS&LR) in 1890. During his time at MS&LR he was responsible for the design of many of the works involved with that company's London Extension.

In 1896 Ross became the Chief Engineer of the Great Northern Railway (GNR), a post he held until 1911 when he became an engineering consultant. During his time at GNR his advice was sought by the company's board on the locomotive design to be chosen for their no.1300 series of engines. Several designs were rejected as they were judged to be too long or heavy for the rail infrastructure. Only one was built, and despite several attempts at redesign by Nigel Gresley the locomotive was scrapped in 1924. His works as an engineering consultant included the Hertford Loop Line and Breydon Viaduct, with Ross serving as the Engineer-in-Chief of the latter. On 16 June 1897 he was appointed Major in the Engineer and Railway Staff Corps, an unpaid unit of the Volunteer Force which provided technical advice to the British Army. He was a Lieutenant-Colonel in that corps at the time it joined the Territorial Force on 1 April 1908. He had been a member of the Institution of Civil Engineers since before 16 June 1897 and from November 1915 to November 1916 he served as their president. Ross died in London on 3 February 1923.

Professional and academic associations
Preceded by Benjamin Hall Blyth	President of the Institution of Civil Engineers; November 1915 – November 1916	Succeeded by Maurice Fitzmaurice
