= Berney Arms =

Settlement in Norfolk, England

Coordinates: 52.5885°N 1.6414°E

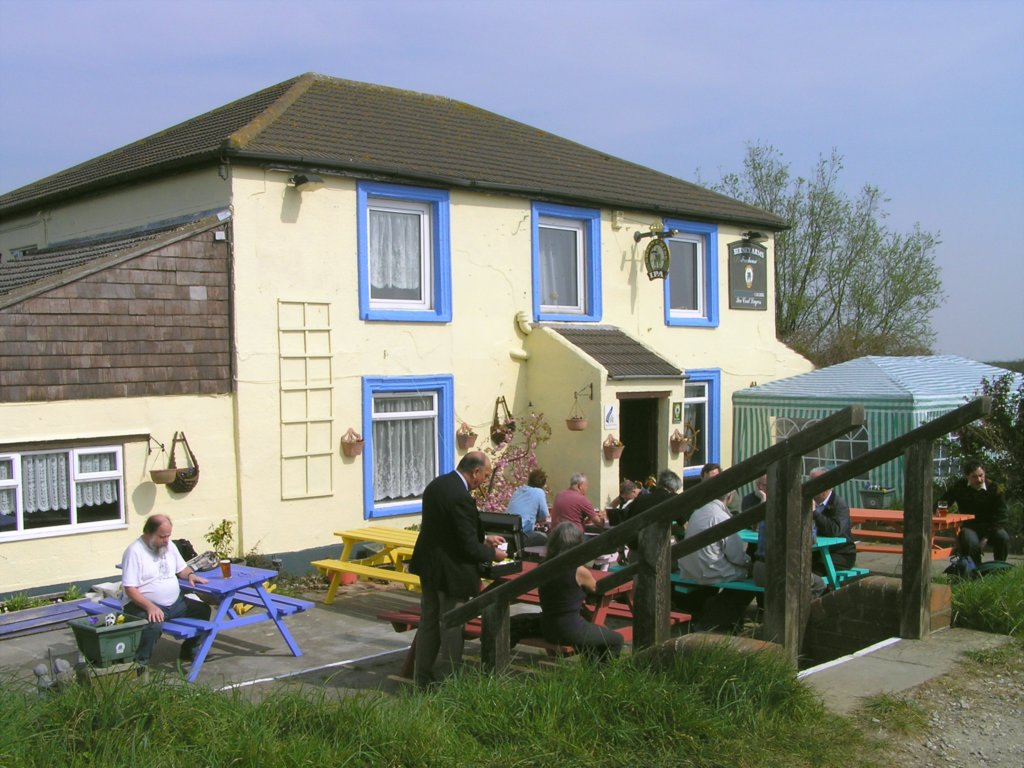
- The Berney Arms public house, which closed in late 2015

- Location within Norfolk
- Civil parish: Reedham
- District: Broadland
- Shire county: Norfolk
- Region: East
- Country: England
- Sovereign state: United Kingdom
- Post town: GREAT YARMOUTH
- Postcode district: NR30
- Dialling code: 01493
- Police: Norfolk
- Fire: Norfolk
- Ambulance: East of England
- UK Parliament: Broadland and Fakenham

Berney Arms is a settlement on the north bank of the River Yare, close to Breydon Water in the English county of Norfolk. It is part of the civil parish of Reedham, in the district of Broadland, and lies within The Broads. It comprises a railway station, a windmill, a farmhouse and a pub which closed in late 2015. In 2020, an adjacent property opened as a bistro. The area is not accessible by public road.

== History ==
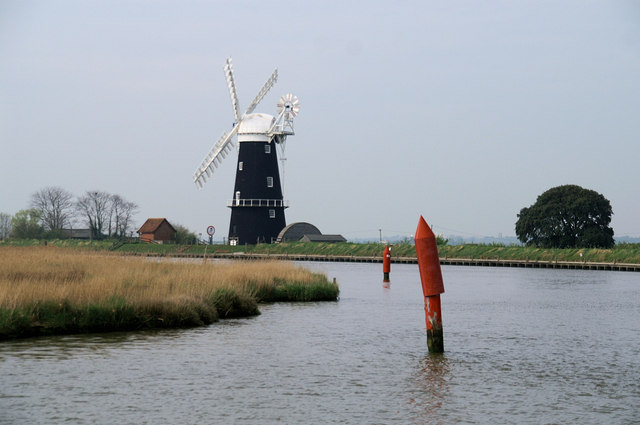
The Berney Arms windmill

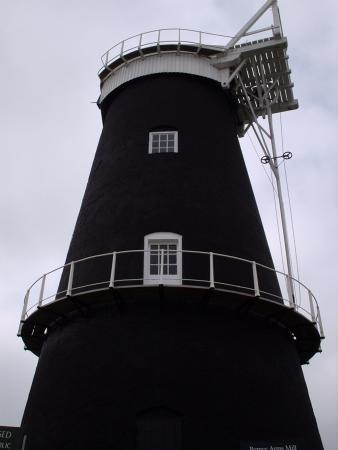
Berney Arms Mill

Berney Arms takes its name from the Berney Arms public house, which is by the staithe on the north bank of the River Yare and which served walkers and boaters passing through the area. It was closed in 2015 and the owner proposed to turn the pub into a private house, but planning permission was refused.

The public house was named after the landowner Thomas Trench Berney who owned the Reedham Cement Works centred on the Berney Arms Windmill. The mill was built in 1865 and is the tallest windmill in Norfolk at 21.5 metres (71 ft) tall. It was used to grind cement clinker and was later converted into a drainage mill. It closed in 1948 and is now a Scheduled Monument in the care of English Heritage. At one point the mill supported a small settlement of 11 domestic dwellings and a chapel. Berney sold the land on which the railway was built, on the condition that a stopping place was built to serve the settlement in perpetuity.

== Geography ==
Berney Arms is in an area of marshland, much of which is at or below sea level. It lies on the River Yare just to the west of Breydon Water. The area is part of Berney Marshes RSPB reserve and within the Halvergate Marshes Site of Special Scientific Interest. These provide important habitats for a range of plant and invertebrate species as well as providing important wintering grounds for bird species such as Bewick's swan.

The area is also a Ramsar Site and part of the Broadland Special Protection Area. Ashtree Farm is used by the RSPB as a series of dwellings and as its base for the marshes.

== Transport ==
Berney Arms can be reached only by train, by boat or on foot; it has no public road access, with only a private track running to it.

Berney Arms railway station is a request stop on the Wherry Lines between Norwich and Great Yarmouth, via Reedham. Greater Anglia operate a limited number of services each day, with more frequent trains on Sundays. In 2019, it was the least-used station in Britain.

The settlement is on both the Weavers' Way and Wherryman's Way footpaths.

== In popular culture ==
Berney Arms was mentioned in Arthur Ransome's children's book Coot Club, which is in the Swallows and Amazon series.

In 1960, BBC reporter Fyfe Robertson made a short black and white documentary covering Berney Arms station and interviewed two residents.
