= Ashtree Farm Windpump =

Windmill in Great Yarmouth, Norfolk, England

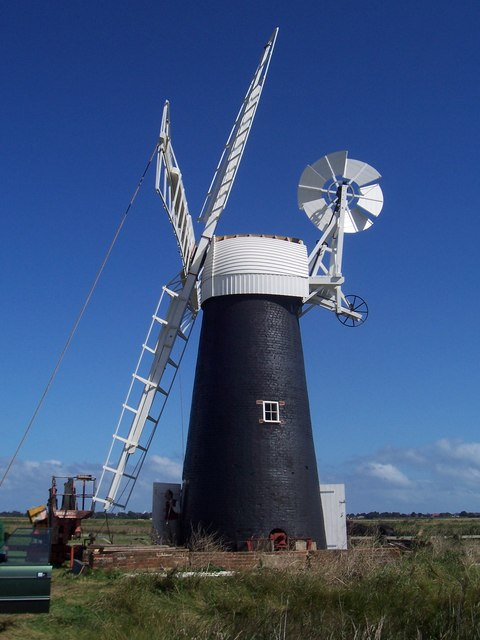
- New sails being fitted to Ashtree Farm Mill, 8 September 2005.
- Interactive map of Ashtree Farm Windpump

Origin
- Mill name: Ashtree Farm Mill
- Mill location: Great Yarmouth, Norfolk, United Kingdom
- Grid reference: TG 5066 0990
- Coordinates: 52°37′33″N 1°42′08″E
- Operator: Norfolk Windmills Trust
- Year built: 1912

Information
- Purpose: Drainage mill
- Type: Tower mill
- Storeys: Three storeys
- No. of sails: Four
- Type of sails: Patent sails
- Windshaft: Cast iron
- Winding: Fantail
- Fantail blades: Six
- Type of pump: Scoopwheel
- Scoopwheel diameter: 15 feet 0 inches (4.57 m)

Ashtree Farm Mill is a Grade II listed tower mill at Great Yarmouth, Norfolk, United Kingdom. Built in 1912, it worked until 1953 when the windshaft snapped in a storm. The mill was restored in 2008.

== History ==
Ashtree Farm Mill was built in 1912 by Smithdale's, millwrights of Acle, Norfolk for the Ecclesiastical Commissioners. The mill was built on the foundations of an earlier mill. It worked until 1 February 1953, when the windshaft snapped during a storm. The mill was listed Grade II on 25 September 1962. Arthur C. Smith surveyed the mill on 17 September 1973. He described it as a derelict tower with the remains of its cap, retaining its machinery. He surveyed it again on 14 July 1987. By that date, the cap was missing. Smith noted that a lease to the Norfolk Windmills Trust was being negotiated. The mill was restored between 2005 and 2008 by Richard Seago, millwright of South Walsham, Norfolk.

== Description ==
Ashtree Farm Mill is a three storey tower mill. The tower is about 26 feet (7.9 m) tall. The mill is 34 feet (10 m) tall to the top of the cap. It is 10 feet (3.0 m) diameter internally at ground floor level, and 14 feet (4.3 m) diameter externally. It has a boat shaped cap with a petticoat. The cap runs on a live curb. Four double Patent sails are carried in a cast iron windshaft. The sails have seven bays of three shutters, and a span of 40 feet (12 m). The mill is winded by a six-blade fantail. The windshaft carries a cast iron brake wheel. This drives the cast iron wallower at the top of the wooden upright shaft. A wooden crown wheel at the bottom of the upright shaft drove a wooden pit wheel of clasp arm construction. This drove the 15 feet 0 inches (4.57 m) diameter cast iron scoopwheel, which has 24 paddles 7 inches (180 mm) wide. The crown wheel and pit wheel were later replaced by cast iron items from Burgh Mill, near Acle, that were cast by Daniel England, millwright of Ludham, Norfolk in 1896. With the sails turning at 15rpm, the scoopwheel turned at 105rpm and lifted 8 tons (1,792 imperial gallons (8,150 L)) of water per minute.
