= Freethorpe =

Village in Norfolk, England

Coordinates: 52.59299°N 1.55621°E

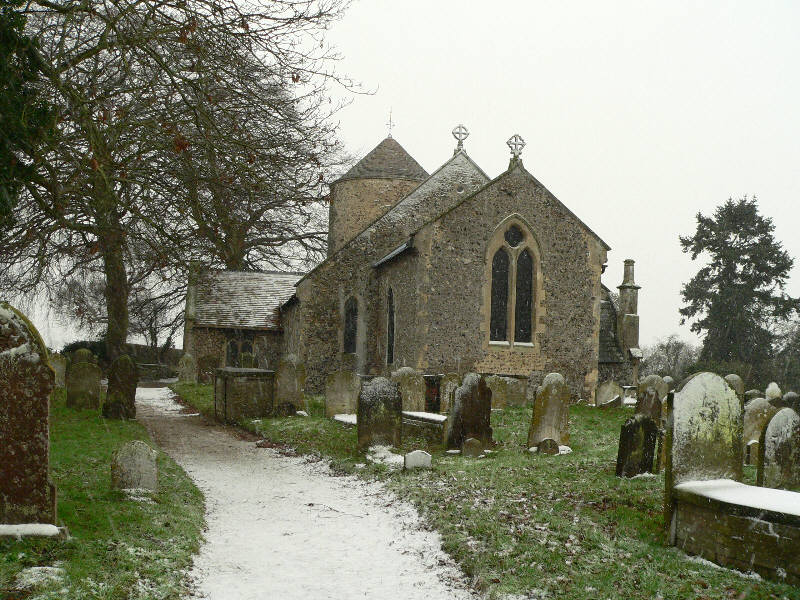
- All Saints' Church, Freethorpe

- Location within Norfolk
- Area: 3.67 sq mi (9.5 km^{2})
- Population: 1,053 (2021 census)
  - Density: 287/sq mi (111/km^{2})
- OS grid reference: TG409054
  - London: 103 miles (166 km)
- Civil parish: Freethorpe
- District: Broadland
- Shire county: Norfolk
- Region: East
- Country: England
- Sovereign state: United Kingdom
- Post town: NORWICH
- Postcode district: NR13
- Dialling code: 01493
- Police: Norfolk
- Fire: Norfolk
- Ambulance: East of England
- UK Parliament: Broadland and Fakenham

Freethorpe is a village and civil parish in the English county of Norfolk. The parish includes the former parish of Wickhampton and parts of Halvergate Marshes.

Freethorpe is located within the Norfolk Broads, 7.2 miles (11.6 km) south-west of Great Yarmouth and 11 miles (18 km) south-east of Norwich.

== History ==
The origin of Freethorpe's name is uncertain. It either derives from the Old Norse for Fraethi's settlement or an amalgamation of the Old Norse and Old English for a settlement offering refuge or safety.

In the Domesday Book, Freethorpe is listed as a settlement of 20 households in the hundred of Blofield. In 1086, the village was divided between the East Anglia estates of King William I, William de Beaufeu and Rabel the engineer.

Several Nineteenth Century almshouses are located within the village, which were built in 1871 by Richard Henry and Harriet Vade Walpole to care for local widows.

During the First World War, the village was home to a Royal Flying Corps airfield between 1916 and 1918. During the Second World War, the airfield was passed on to the Royal Observer Corps who operated the site until the mid-Twentieth Century. In addition, an eastern part of the parish was designated as a Starfish site during the Second World War to draw Luftwaffe attention away from Norwich and Great Yarmouth.

== Geography ==
According to the 2021 census, Freethorpe has a population of 1,053 people which shows an increase from the 995 people recorded in the 2011 census.

Freethorpe is located within the Norfolk Broads.

== All Saints' Church ==
Freethorpe's parish church is one of Norfolk's remaining 124 round-tower churches, with the tower dating from the Twelfth Century and the remainder of the church dating from the Thirteenth Century. All Saints' is located within the village on 'The Green' and has been Grade II listed since 1962. The church still holds church services twice a month.

All Saints' was restored in the Nineteenth Century by Anthony Salvin at the behest of Richard Henry Vade Walpole, Lord of the Manor of Freethorpe. The stained-glass inside the church was installed by Thomas Willement and Clayton and Bell and largely glorify the Walpole family.

Freethorpe also has a Methodist Chapel that holds regular church services and seats up to 150 people.

== Amenities ==
The majority of local children attend Freethorpe Community Primary School, which was rated as 'Good' by Ofsted in 2016 which was subsequently upheld in 2019.

== Governance ==
Freethorpe is part of the electoral ward of Marshes for local elections and is part of the district of Broadland.

The village's national constituency is Broadland and Fakenham which has been represented by the Conservative Party's Jerome Mayhew MP since 2019.
