= Berney Marshes & Breydon Water RSPB reserve =

RSPB nature reserve in Norfolk, England

Berney Marshes and Breydon Water
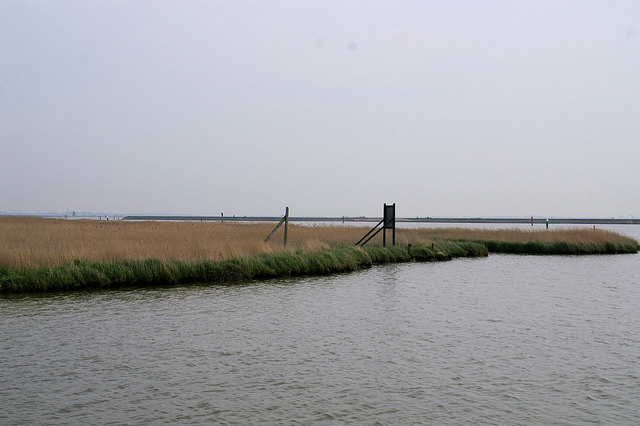
- Berney Marshes Looking across the marsh below the Berney Arms towards Breydon Water.
- Interactive map of Berney Marshes and Breydon Water
- Type: Nature reserve
- Location: Norfolk, England
- Coordinates: 52.5851°N 1.6360°E
- Operator: RSPB

Berney Marshes and Breydon Water RSPB reserve is a nature reserve managed by the Royal Society for the Protection of Birds (RSPB). Berney Marshes is situated south of the River Bure while Breydon water is the combined estuary of the River Waveney and the River Yare inland from Great Yarmouth in Norfolk, England.

Berney Marshes is part of the larger area of the Halvergate Marshes. The Berney Marshes and Breydon Water habitats are being managed by the RSPB to benefit all of the wildlife in the area but in particular the breeding and wintering birds. The area managed by the RSPB extends to 550 hectares (1,400 acres) of improved wet grassland and in winter the total numbers of wildfowl and waders can reach 85,000. Species the reserve is important for include pink-footed goose, Eurasian wigeon and black-tailed godwit. The water levels are kept high into the Spring so that the grasslands are in a good condition for breeding common redshank and Northern lapwing, this being helped by the grazing of cattle which helps to make the grassland sward more suitable for breeding waders. The ditches are amanged on a 7-10 year cycle to optimise the diversity of insects and other aquatic invertebrates within them. In addition, the RSPB manage 375 hectares (930 acres) of intertidal mud flats as a sanctuary for the wintering birds.

The reserve cannot be accessed by car, it can be reached by foot from Great Yarmouth or by taking a train from either Norwich or Great Yarmouth to Berney Arms station.
