= Wherryman's Way =

Long-distance footpath in Norfolk, England

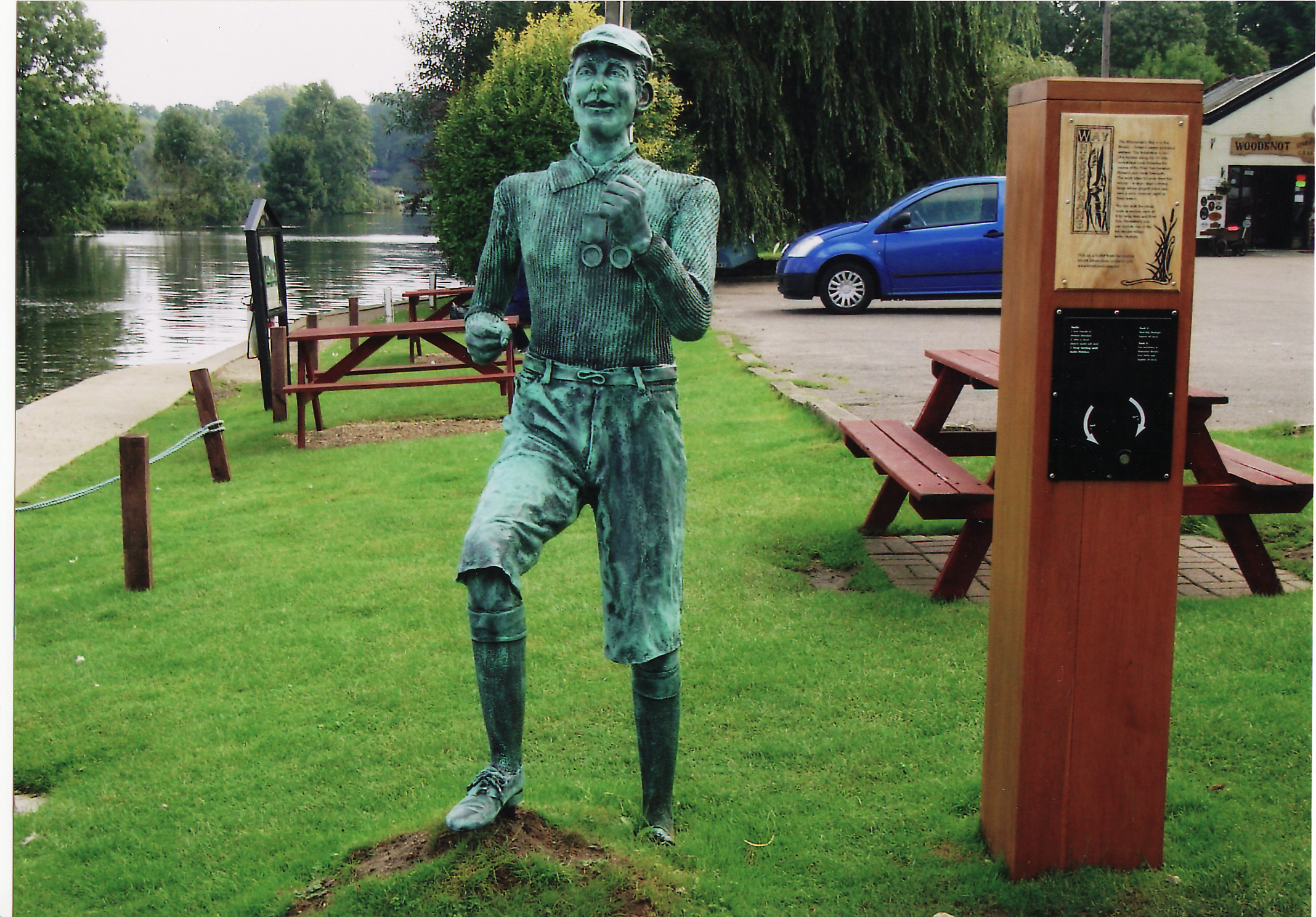
- The life-size sculpture of Billy Bluelight on the trail's route, at the Water's Edge public house in Bramerton
- Length: 37.5 mi (60.4 km)
- Location: Norfolk
- Trailheads: Norwich, (Note: Location: 52.6268°N 1.3061°E); Great Yarmouth (Note: Location: 52.6063°N 1.7368°E)
- Use: Walking, hiking
- Season: All year round

Wherryman's Way is a long-distance footpath in the English county of Norfolk. It is 37.5 miles (60.4 km) in length, running between Norwich and Great Yarmouth. The trail is named after the trading wherries that used the river Yare to travel inland to Norwich.

== Route ==
The route approaching Breydon pumping station

The way follows the course of the river Yare, where possible, with some significant stretches away from the river where there is no continuous path alongside it. Where the river Chet meets the Yare, it follows the former upstream to Loddon and then largely uses roads to the Reedham Ferry to cross the Yare.

From Reedham, the way follows the northern bank of the Yare, passing Berney Arms where it joins the route of the Weavers' Way. The two routes then follow the northern edge of Breydon Water, before going under Breydon Bridge and into Great Yarmouth. By Vauxhall Bridge, next to Yarmouth station, a sculpture marks the end point of the Wherryman's Way, Weavers' Way and Angles Way.

== Media ==
In September 2011, Future Radio broadcast a five-episode series of documentaries about the Wherryman's Way, funded by the Broads Authority's Sustainable Development Fund.
