= River Yare =

River in England

Yare
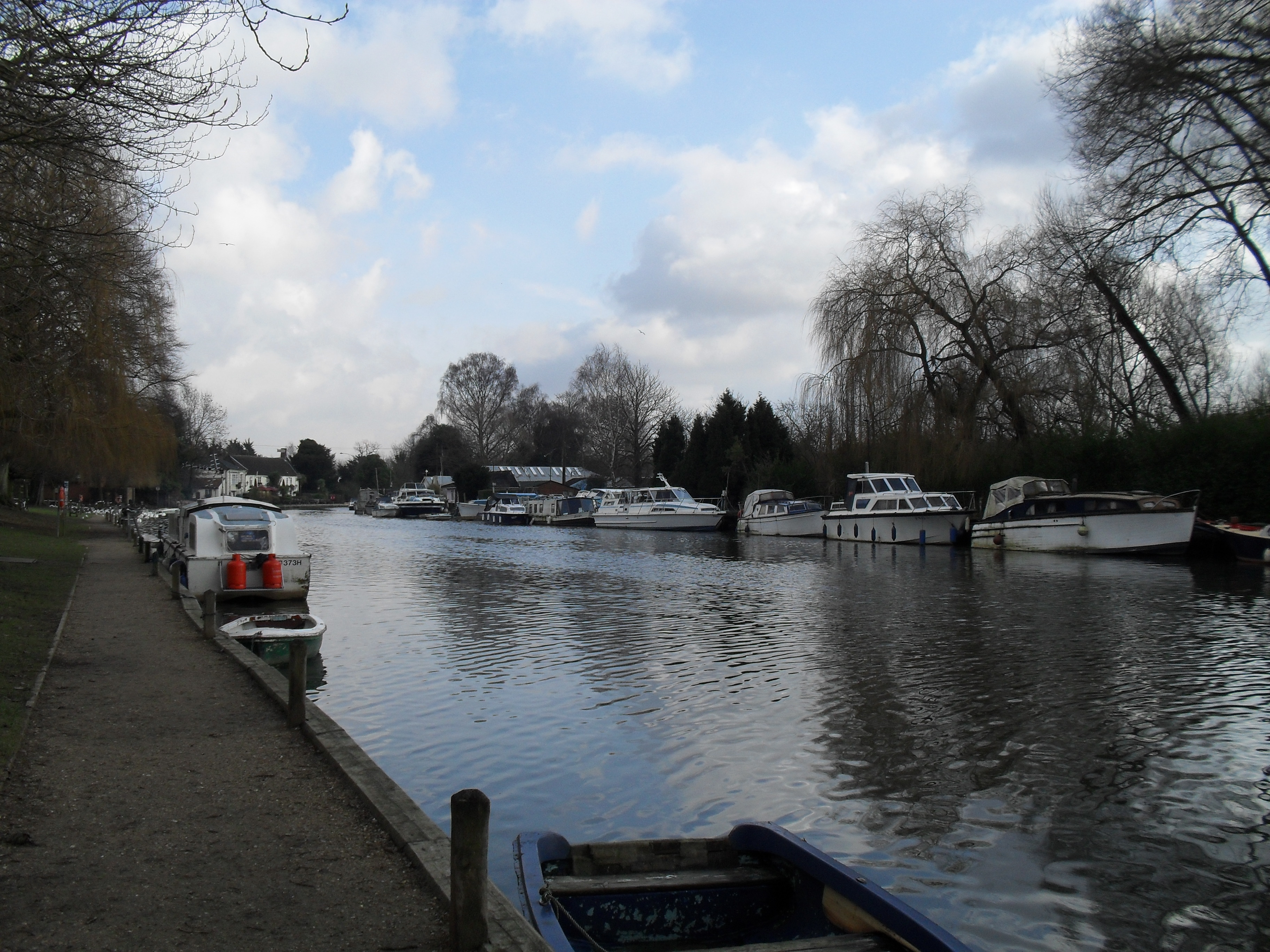
- The river at Thorpe Green, Norwich

- Location of the river mouth within Norfolk

Location
- Country: England
- Region: Norfolk

Physical characteristics
- Source
  - location: west of Shipdham
  - coordinates: 52°37′9″N 0°50′17″E
  - elevation: 79 m (259 ft)
- Mouth: North Sea
  - coordinates: 52°34′21″N 1°44′15″E
  - elevation: 0 m (0 ft)
- Length: 83.5 km (51.9 mi)

Basin features
- River system: River Wensum

The River Yare is a river in the English county of Norfolk. In its lower reaches it is one of the principal navigable waterways of The Broads and connects with the rest of the network.

The river rises south of Dereham to the west to the village of Shipdham. Above its confluence with a tributary stream from Garvestone it is known as the Blackwater River. From there it flows in a generally eastward direction passing Barnham Broom and is joined by the River Tiffey before reaching Bawburgh. It then skirts the southern fringes of the city of Norwich, passing through Colney, Cringleford, Lakenham, and Trowse. At Whitlingham it is joined by the River Wensum and although the Wensum is the larger and longer of the two, the river downstream of their confluence continues to be called the Yare. Flowing eastward into The Broads it passes the villages of Bramerton, Surlingham, Rockland St. Mary and Cantley. Just before Reedham at Hardley Cross (erected in 1676) it is joined by the River Chet. The cross marks the ancient boundary between the City of Norwich and Borough of Great Yarmouth. Beyond Reedham the river passes the famously isolated marshland settlement of Berney Arms before entering the tidal lake of Breydon Water. Here the Yare is joined by the Rivers Waveney and Bure and finally enters the North Sea at Gorleston, Great Yarmouth.

The Yare is the frequent subject of landscape paintings by members of the early 19th century Norwich School of artists. The National Gallery of Art in Washington D.C. contains an oil painting by John Crome entitled Moonlight on the Yare. Joseph Stannard depicted the river in Thorpe Water Frolic, Afternoon (1824) and Boats on the Yare near Bramerton (1828) which is in the Fitzwilliam Museum, Cambridge.

The river is navigable to small coastal vessels from Norwich to the sea, and in former times carried significant commercial traffic to that city. At Reedham the river is joined by the Haddiscoe Cut, a canal which provides a direct navigable link to the River Waveney at Haddiscoe avoiding Breydon Water.

== Navigation ==
The river provides a navigable link between Norwich and the North Sea, but silting has been a long-standing problem. In 1698, an Act of Parliament was obtained which allowed duty to be collected for any coal traffic using the river. The money raised was to pay for improvements to the course of the river and to the harbour at Great Yarmouth, but the majority of it went towards harbour improvements, and little improvement of the river occurred. Three more acts attempted to rectify the situation, but the river continued to be neglected. A fifth act, obtained in 1772, sought to address the problem in a different way, and specified how the tolls were to be used. 15 per cent was to be given to Norwich for river improvements between the city and Hardley Cross, 25 per cent was given to Yarmouth for improvements to the lower river between Hardley Cross and the town, with a further 40 per cent set aside for maintenance of Yarmouth harbour. Other rivers benefitted from the remaining 20 per cent.

The size of vessels that could reach Norwich was limited by the shallow channel crossing Breydon Water, and so all goods arriving from the North Sea had to be trans-shipped to smaller vessels at Yarmouth. In order to improve the situation the merchants of Norwich asked William Cubitt to look for a solution in 1814. His proposal consisted of dredging a new channel to the south side of Breydon Water and making various improvements to the river. This was costed at £35,000, but the plan was opposed by Yarmouth Corporation when it was made public in 1818. John Rennie, acting for the corporation, concluded that the plan might result in silting of the harbour, and so Cubitt proposed an alternative, which would link the Yare to Lowestoft. This was also opposed by Yarmouth Corporation, but despite the cost being more than double, and assurances from Thomas Telford and James Walker that improved navigation to Norwich would not harm Yarmouth, this was the plan that was laid before Parliament in 1826.

The Act would authorise dredging of the Yare between Norwich and Reedham, from where a 2 1/2-mile (4 km) canal would be built to connect to the River Waveney at Haddiscoe. Oulton Dyke would be enlarged, and a cut and lock built to link Oulton Broad to Lake Lothing, and hence the North Sea. At the formal enquiry, six engineers gave evidence for the proposal, but the opposition of Yarmouth and local landowners who feared potential flooding resulted in the bill being narrowly defeated. Similar plans were submitted in the next parliamentary session, with Yarmouth spending £8,000 to ensure its defeat. Evidence for the plan included details of widespread theft during the transshipment process at Yarmouth. A man had hidden in a wicker basket to record the conversations and activities of the thieves, and ultimately 18 men were convicted of taking the goods and one of receiving it. The Act was granted on 28 May 1827.

The Act allowed the Norwich and Lowestoft Navigation Company to raise £100,000 as capital, with an additional £50,000 if necessary. Work started at the Lowestoft end, with Alderman Crisp Brown of Norwich cutting the first sod in the autumn. The lock and channel between Oulton Broad and Lake Lothing were completed by 1829, and the first vessel used Lowestoft harbour on 3 June 1831. Costs overran, and to complete the Haddiscoe cut, the additional £50,000 authorised by the Act was raised by taking a loan from the Exchequer Bill Loan Commissioners. The cut was completed in 1832, and the improvements of the remaining 32 miles (51 km) to Norwich were finished by the autumn of 1833. A grand opening was held on 30 September 1833, when it was planned that the Jarrow would tow two vessels, the City of Norwich and the Squire, which were moored at Lowestoft, to Norwich. Unfortunately, the Jarrow was at Yarmouth, and the Corporation refused to open the bridge at the head of Breydon Water to allow the vessel to pass. The captain eventually cut down the funnel, but the delay resulted in him missing the tide, and he had to wait to cross Breydon Water. The convoy reached Norwich the following day, where 10,000 people lined the banks of the river to witness the event.

Despite high hopes, the venture was not a success, as operating costs exceeded revenue, and the loan from the Exchequer Bill Loan Commission could not be repaid. The arrival of the railways added an element of competition, and the Commissioners took over the Haddiscoe Cut in 1842, selling it on to Sir Samuel Morton Peto, a railway developer. A new cut was made at Thorpe in 1844, where the railway crossed a loop in the river. The bridges at both ends of the old course restrict headroom to about 6 feet (1.8 m). The City of Norwich attempted to buy the navigation in 1848, but were again opposed by Yarmouth, and withdrew their bill from Parliament. Silting of Lake Lothing became a problem, and traffic gradually reverted to using the route through Yarmouth. A grandiose plan to build a ship canal between Yarmouth and Norwich with a commercial dock at Whitlingham and a naval base at Rockland Broad, proposed in 1908, came to nothing, but steam tugs continued to haul barges of coal to Norwich until the 1960s. Commercial traffic has now been replaced by leisure boating.

The river is tidal as far as Trowse Mills, with a tidal range of 2 1/2 to 3 feet (0.76 to 0.91 m) at Reedham and 1 1/2 to 2 feet (0.46 to 0.61 m) at Norwich. High water at Reedham occurs some 1 1/2 hours after high water at Yarmouth, and at Norwich it is 4 1/2 hours after Yarmouth.

== Hydronymy ==
The derivation of the name has been the subject of debate, M. R. James states that the Saxon Shore fort, Gariannonum (which he identified as Burgh Castle) takes its name from the original Common Celtic name for the Yare. Ptolemy records a Latinized version of this name as Gariennos around 150 AD. Eilert Ekwall gives another derivation, that the river name is a back-formation from Yarmouth.

== Wherryman's Way ==
Opened in 2005, the 35 mile long Wherryman's Way follows the route of the historic Broads trading wherries between Norwich and Great Yarmouth. It winds through existing footpaths, open marshes, reedbeds, grazing meadows and riverside villages along the banks of the River Yare. The path passes numerous information panels, sculptures and audio posts which seek to bring to life the characters and history of the route.
