= Murrow =

Murrow may refer to

- Edward R. Murrow (1908-1965), an American radio and television journalist
- Murrow (film), a 1986 made-for-TV biopic about the journalist
- Murrow, Cambridgeshire
  - Murrow East railway station
  - Murrow West railway station
