= Wisbech St Mary =

Village in Cambridgeshire, England

Coordinates: 52.63°N 0.1°E

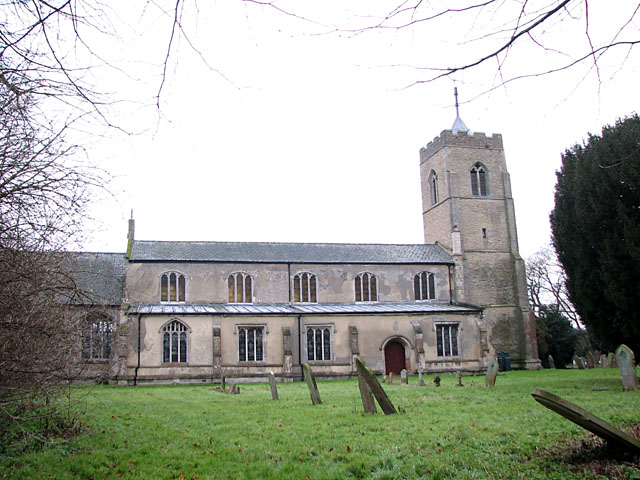
- St Mary's Church, Wisbech St Mary

- Location within Cambridgeshire
- Population: 3,556 (2011)
- OS grid reference: TF421060
- District: Fenland
- Shire county: Cambridgeshire
- Region: East
- Country: England
- Sovereign state: United Kingdom
- Post town: Wisbech
- Postcode district: PE13
- Dialling code: 01945

Wisbech St Mary is a village in the Fenland District of Cambridgeshire, England. It is 2 miles (3 km) west of the town of Wisbech. It lies between two roads, the B1169 and the A47. The population of the civil parish (including Guyhirn and Thorney Toll) at the 2011 Census was 3,556.

== History ==
The parish is named after the dedication of its parish church to St Mary. The Church of St Mary is a Grade II* listed building. The church is essentially perpendicular but with restorations of 1894 and 1901.

In the later Middle Ages various subordinate manors were located in the parish including Hiptofts, Jackets, Tuddenham Hall and Bevis Hall.

About 1400 Edward and John Hiptoft had a licence for an oratory in their house on or near the site of Hiptoft Farm, about a mile east of Murrow and a mile west of St Mary's village. In 1476 Isabel, wife of Sir William Norreys and widow of John Nevile, Marquess of Montagu, held 100 shillings rents of assize in Wisbech, known as 'Hiptofts rent'. The manor of Hiptofts was settled in 1525–6 by Christopher Coote and Elizabeth his wife on John Huddleston and others, together with the fishery and 40 shillings rent in Wisbech and Leverington. By 1620 it was held by Humphrey Gardiner of the Bishop of Ely as of his manor of Wisbech.

The manor of Jackets may be traced back to the lands of John Cave in 1492–3. By 1542 it was in possession of the Megges family, who were tenants of a good deal of property including the Bishop of Ely's manor of Wisbech Barton; in the same year Thomas Megges died and his son Nicholas inherited. The next recorded owner in 1587, Henry Adams of Tydd St Mary, bequeathed it to his brother Thomas, of Duxford. In 1635 William Steward bequeathed it to his brother Thomas. It was then held of the bishop as of his manor of Wisbech. The name survived until at least 1777 as that of a piece of land of about 19 acres in Sayers Field, on the north side of the village street of St Mary's near an old Primitive Methodist chapel.

Tuddenham Hall in 1392 was held by Sir John de Tuddenham of the prior of Ely. The first recorded lord was Sir Robert (1281), and it continued in the Tuddenham family until the execution of Sir Thomas at the accession of Edward IV, when his estates were forfeited. In 1620 Tuddenham Hall manor, with 200 acres of arable land, was held by Humphrey Gardiner, to whom it had been bequeathed by his father Thomas (d. 1566). A grandson and heir, another Humphrey, was then aged 12, and had livery of this manor and Hiptofts in 1636. In 1677 it was conveyed by him, his wife Helen, and son Humphrey to John Willys, and was for a short time in the Penhall family until in 1703 it was conveyed by John and Cecile Penhall to Richard Reynolds, whose family held possession up to 1800.

Bevis Hall, later represented by a farm of that name on the North Brink at the south-east corner of the parish, was settled in 1624 by William Reve of London, on his daughter Margaret Bromley. In the 18th century it passed to the Drury and the Southwell families, the latter also being lessees of Wisbech Castle, and in 1746 it was bequeathed by Edward Southwell to his wife Jane, and by her to Sir Clement Trafford of Dunton Hall, Tydd St Mary. It was sold after his death to Francis Saunders of Parson Drove. After being in the Culy family it was purchased in 1851 by Joseph Peck, whose son John sold it to W G Jackson. A grandson N G Jackson sold it about 1910 to Frank Britain. The property was re-sold about 1933.

Wisbech St Mary was the least nucleated of all the Isle of Ely parishes. Other villages include Murrow, Guyhirn and Thorney Toll. The Peterborough-Sutton Bridge branch of the former M. & G.N joint railway, opened in 1866, had stations in the parish at Murrow (East) and Wisbech St Mary. The March–Spalding line, opened in 1867, had stations at Murrow (West) and Guyhirne.

The Pepys family farmed a manor in the parish. It was leased to Samuel Pepys in 1639 for 21 years.

A mission chapel was built at Tholomas Drove and Primitive Methodist chapels in the village and Tholomas Drove. The village has an Anglican church, a primary school and some public houses. The village is built on an old watercourse, a roddon; such sand and silt beds are firmer and rise higher than the surrounding shrinking peat fens.

== Tansey Feast ==
A feast was formerly "holden and kept" in the parish of Wisbech St Mary. This feast was called the "Tansey Feast" because the herb tansy (Tanacetum vulgare) grew in great abundance in the neighbourhood, and it formed an ingredient in the puddings which were the chief feature in the "good doings", accompanied by drinking and revelry. The feast was abolished by the exertions of the Rev. Dr. Abraham Jobson, from 1802 the vicar of Wisbech St Peter and Wisbech St Mary (then one living), who was a magistrate. The disappearance brought upon him the censure of his parishioners, and the following was one of the rhyming satires of the time:

"Poor Hodge he died the other day All on a sudden; The reason's plain—in Hodge's pot Ne'er boiled a Tansey Pudding. His wife, she did lament and wail, And wish his shoes she'd stood in, For she a widow lone was left, For want of Tansey Pudding."

After enumerating other dire calamities which befell the parish, the recipe for making the pudding is given as follows:

"Of flour a sack, and eggs eight score, Then pour of milk a flood in, Beat, boil, and stir a month or more To make a Tansy Pudding."

The first Sunday after the abolition of the feast, the vicar, on going to officiate at St Mary, found a young donkey fastened in the reading desk, and a very small attendance of the "dearly beloved brethren" who formed his flock.
