= Gedney Hill =

Village and civil parish in South Holland district of Lincolnshire, England

Coordinates: 52.67°N 0.01°W

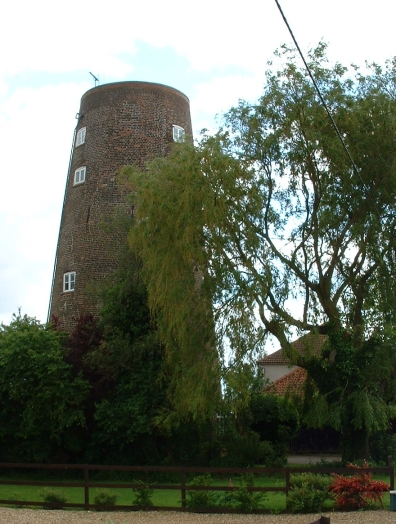
- Gedney Hill tower mill

- Location within Lincolnshire
- Population: 737 2011 census
- OS grid reference: TF3311
  - London: 80 mi (130 km) S
- District: South Holland
- Unitary authority: Lincolnshire
- Shire county: Lincolnshire
- Ceremonial county: Lincolnshire
- Region: East Midlands
- Country: England
- Sovereign state: United Kingdom
- Post town: SPALDING
- Postcode district: PE12
- Dialling code: 01406
- Police: Lincolnshire
- Fire: Lincolnshire
- Ambulance: East Midlands
- UK Parliament: South Holland and The Deepings

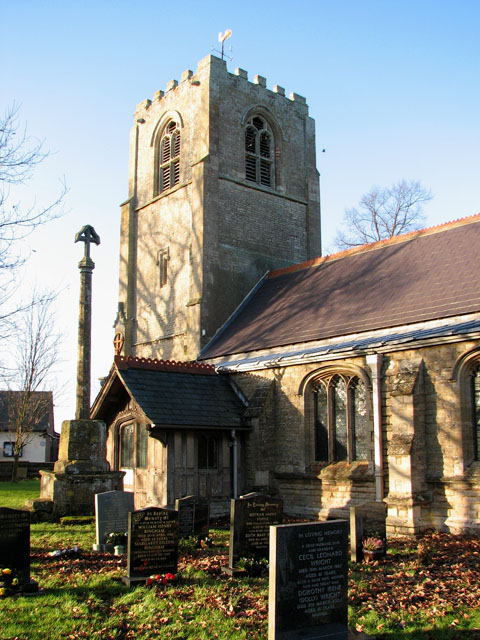
Holy Trinity church, Gedney Hill

Gedney Hill is a village and civil parish in South Holland district of Lincolnshire, England. The population of the civil parish at the 2011 census was 737. It is situated close to the border of Cambridgeshire, and approximately 9 miles (14 km) south-east of Spalding, 8 miles (13 km) west of Wisbech and 9 miles (14 km) south of Holbeach.

== Community ==
The name Gedney is from the Old English 'gaeda+eg', or "island of Gaeda".

In 1885 Kelly's Directory noted the existence of an 1859-60 built school, endowed with church lands and holding 100 pupils, agricultural production of wheat, oats, potatoes and beans, and the French Drove railway station.

The French Drove and Gedney Hill railway station on the branch line between Postland and Murrow closed in 1964. The line was part of the Great Northern and Great Eastern Joint Railway.

Gedney Hill Golf Club, designed by Charles Britton in 1989, has a 5257-yard parkland course of 18 holes.

Gedney Hill Grade II* listed Anglican parish church is dedicated to the Holy Trinity. Dating from the late 14th century, it was heavily restored in 1874-75 by James Fowler. The restoration included the entire rebuilding of the outer walls. The arcades are supported by octagonal oak piers, and the roof by Perpendicular-style tie-beams. The stained glass east window is by Ward and Hughes. At the south of the churchyard, which also contains war graves of two airmen of the Second World War, is a listed 15th-century cross, restored in 1918.

The ecclesiastical parish of Gedney Hill is part of the Whaplode Drove Group of the Deanery of Elloe East. The 2013 incumbent is The Revd R J Morrison.

Further Grade II listed buildings are Gedney Hill Mill, and the former Red Lion public house.

Gedney Hill CE primary school is a Voluntary controlled Church of England school. The current (2013) Headteacher is Mrs A Buddle. The school's 2010 Ofsted inspection found it to be Grade 2 (Good) for "overall effectiveness". The 2010 Diocese report stated that the school was "good" in its distinctiveness and effectiveness, leadership and management, and at meeting the needs of learners, with strengths in spiritual development and collective worship.
