= Guyhirn Chapel of Ease =

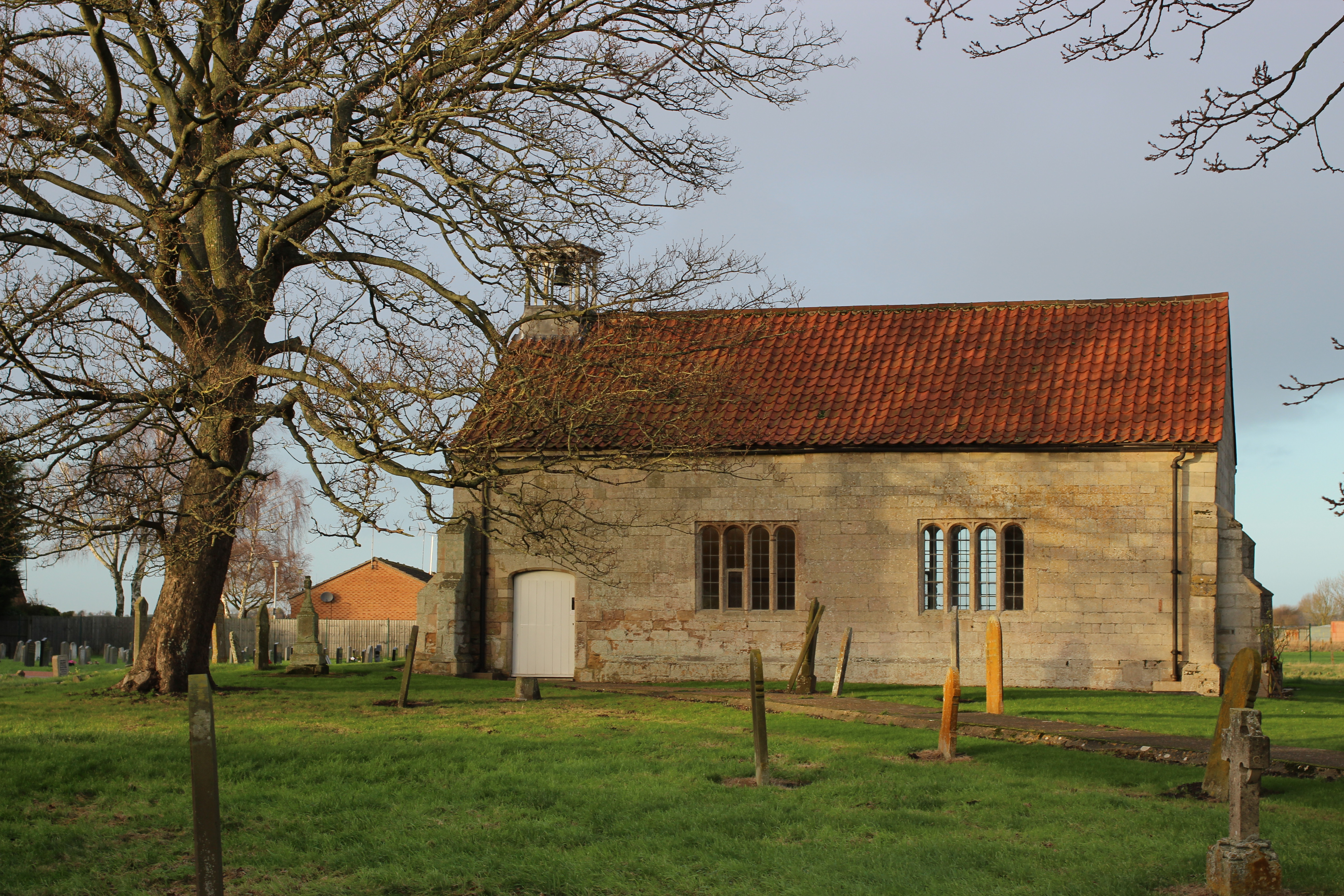
- Guyhirn Chapel of Ease
- 52.6158°N 0.0710°E
- Location: Guyhirn, Cambridgeshire
- Country: England
- Denomination: Anglican

History
- Founded: 1660

Architecture
- Functional status: Redundant
- Heritage designation: Grade II*

Administration
- Province: Canterbury
- Diocese: Ely

Guyhirn Chapel of Ease, also known as Guyhirn Old Church, is a small rectangular chapel in Guyhirn, Cambridgeshire noted for being built during the Puritan Commonwealth of England. It has survived relatively unchanged since this time, and is a Grade II* listed building under the care of the Churches Conservation Trust.

== History ==
Money to build the chapel was left in 1651, and the building was designed for Puritan worship during the Cromwellian Commonwealth of England. It was built on a site which may have been the location of a medieval chantry (there is evidence of some older stone in the structure). By the 17th century, the land was owned by Thomas Parke of Wisbech, who had Puritan sympathies. After his death in 1630, his land was purchased by Peterhouse, Cambridge, and it is on part of this land that the chapel was built.

A stone above the door reads "RP 1660" recording the date of its completion. The "RP" most likely refers to its "builder or benefactor" or, as its construction probably commenced and advanced during his protectorate, to Richard Cromwell (standing for Richard Protector). It was Cromwell's fall in late May 1659, that ushered in the Restoration of the monarchy in 1660, which in turn restored Anglicanism as the official religious observance with the Act of Uniformity of 1662. The chapel was not consecrated, as the consecration and licensing of churches was suspended during the Commonwealth. In 1665 parish churchwardens were ordered, "Doe not suffer one Malclome Johnson a pretended minister to officiate or doe any ministerialle office there under payne of contempt," suggesting that Johnson was a recalcitrant Calvinist who led a congregation at the chapel in the intervening years.

At the Restoration, it became a chapel of ease under the vicar of St Peter and St Paul, Wisbech until 1854 when Wisbech St Mary was created a separate parish. The Bishop of Ely consecrated the grounds of the Chapel as a burial ground in 1840. In 1871, a new parish of Guyhirn with Rings End was created, and the chapel became a church in its own right until George Gilbert Scott's new church of St Mary Magdalene was opened in 1878. From then, it became a mortuary chapel (under which name it is recorded by Nikolaus Pevsner in his 1954 survey of the Buildings of England). Despite restoration work in 1918, its condition deteriorated during the 20th century, and the last service was held in 1960.

Donald Dickinson, the Vicar of Guyhirn during the 1970s, began an initiative to restore the chapel, and by 1973 the 'Friends of the Guyhirn Chapel of Ease' was formed under the presidency of John Betjeman. The chapel was restored and rededicated by the Bishop of Ely in July 1975. Betjeman wrote a short poem entitled "Guyhirn Chapel of Ease" for a pamphlet in 1977, later anthologised in Harvest Bells: New and Uncollected Poems in 2019;

In brick and stone and glass and wood
Three centuries has this beacon stood
“Puritan relic of the past”
Built to shine and built to last
Long on its one East Anglian level
It praises God and shames the devil.

After Betjeman's death, the writer Edward Storey became the president of the Friends. Following his retirement the position was accepted by Janet Dickinson, widow of Donald Dickinson, in 2000. Supported by the Friends, the chapel is in the care of the Churches Conservation Trust and is recorded in the National Heritage List for England as a designated Grade II* listed building.

== Description ==
The building has remained largely unchanged throughout its existence, and its design retains an austere Puritan aesthetic; constructed of brick and Barnack stone, with five windows of clear leaded glass set in stone mullions. The roof is of red pantiles topped by a small wooden bellcote containing a bell dated 1637.

The interior consists of close-set oak pews, which prevented the congregation kneeling for prayer, a practice disapproved of by Puritans. There is little decoration, with a low plastered ceiling, brick paving, clear glass and plain walls, meaning the congregation's focus is on the spoken word of the minister in the raised pulpit. Rows of hat pegs on the walls allow for large 17th-century headwear to be hung. Two Regency-era ventilators in the ceiling are the only later decorative elements.
