= Thorney Toll =

Hamlet in Cambridgeshire, England

Coordinates: 52.6169°N 0.0211°W

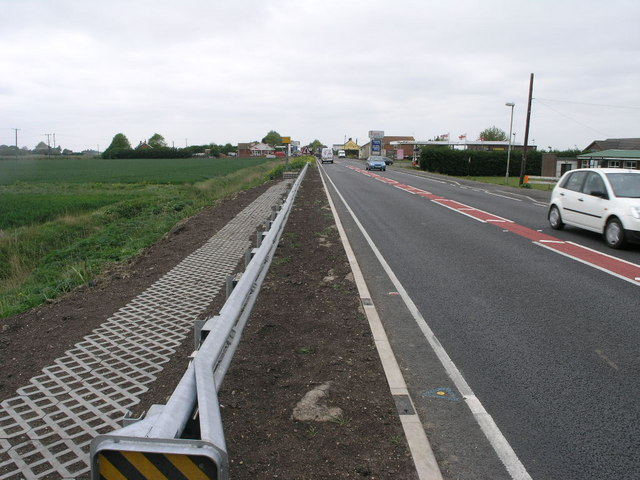

Thorney Toll is a hamlet in Fenland District, in the Isle of Ely, Cambridgeshire, England. The hamlet sits either side of the A47 between Guyhirn and Peterborough. It is 12 miles from Wisbech. The population is included in the civil parish of Wisbech St Mary.

Thorney Toll was part of the parish of Wisbech St Mary
