= Ring's End =

Hamlet in Cambridgeshire, England

Coordinates: 52°36′18″N 0°03′49″E

- Location within Cambridgeshire
- OS grid reference: TF 39878 02776
- Shire county: Cambridgeshire
- Region: East
- Country: England
- Sovereign state: United Kingdom
- Post town: Wisbech
- Postcode district: PE13

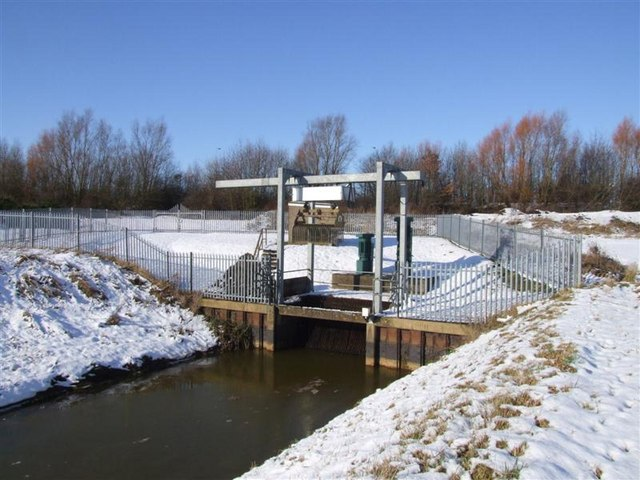
Ring's End Pumping Station

Ring's End is a hamlet near Guyhirn in the Isle of Ely in Cambridgeshire, England. The population is included in the civil parish of Elm in the Fenland District.

== History ==
Land surrounding Elm including Coldham suffered serious flooding, with loss of human life, stock and crops ruined. As a result Elm and district became "greatly impoverished and likely to be overthrown". Attempts to improve the situation took place and the "Little Bill" of 1607 involving 6,000 acres known as "The Ring of Waldersea and Coldham" involving a system of drainage ditches forming a rough circle led to an improvement in the area. This "ring" is commemorated in the name Ring's End, although the hamlet is unnamed by the 1824 Ordnance Survey.

Ring's End School was built in 1860 as a school and mission hall. The class rooms were on the upper floor. It was enlarged in 1894-5 and again in 1905. The school was closed in 1949.

In 1889 the "lock-up" was rented out by Wisbech council.

As a consequence of a bridge being built across the river Nene and the A47 being rerouted, the hamlet now sits on the A141 next to the junction with the A47.

Nearby is the Ring's End nature reserve.

== See also ==
- Guyhirne railway station
- List of places in Cambridgeshire
- Ring's End Local Nature Reserve
