= French Drove and Gedney Hill railway station =

Former railway station in Lincolnshire, England

Coordinates: 52.6637°N 0.0316°W

French Drove and Gedney Hill
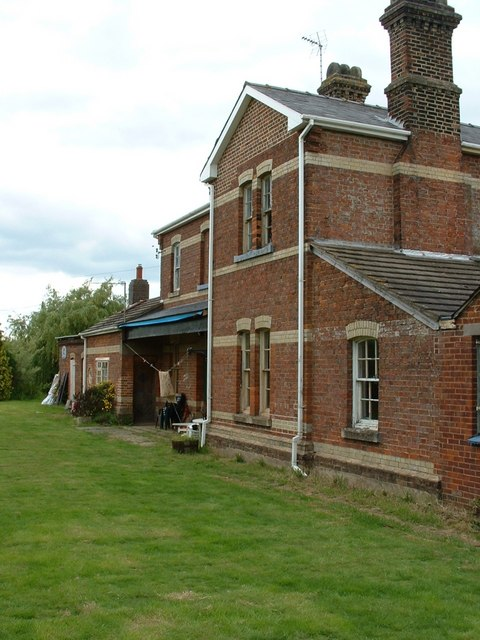
- Former station building

General information
- Location: Fenland; England
- Platforms: 2

Other information
- Status: Disused

History
- Original company: Great Northern Railway
- Pre-grouping: Great Northern and Great Eastern Joint Railway
- Post-grouping: London and North Eastern Railway

Key dates
- 2 September 1867: Opened
- 11 September 1961: closed for passengers
- 5 October 1964: Closed for freight
Location

French Drove and Gedney Hill was a station on the Great Northern and Great Eastern Joint Railway near Gedney Hill in south Lincolnshire on the line between Spalding and March.

Former Services

Preceding station	Disused railways	Following station
Murrow West	Great Northern and Great Eastern	Postland
