= Tiddy Mun =

English mythological spirit

Tiddy Mun was a legendary bog spirit in England, who was believed to have the ability to control the waters and mists of The Fens of South Lincolnshire, The Carrs of North Lincolnshire and fens of the Isle of Ely.

== Legend ==
The belief in Tiddy Mun was first documented in June 1891 in an article by M. C. Balfour in the Folklore Society journal Folk-Lore. In the article she recalls a story, collected in the Ancholme Valley, told to her by an older person who spoke of a curse of pestilence that had been cast upon his village by the Tiddy Mun, who was angered at the draining of the Fens by the Dutch, led by Cornelius Vermuyden, in the seventeenth century. According to the story the Tiddy Mun was eventually placated after the villagers gathered at twilight at the time of the new moon, poured buckets of water into the dyke and apologised for the damage caused.

He was not exclusively malevolent; if the Fens flooded and the waters reached the villages, people would go out at night and call Tiddy Mun wi'out a name, tha watters thruff! ("Tiddy Mun without a name, the water's through!") until they heard the cry of a peewit, and the next morning the waters would have receded.

In his 1987 Folklore paper "Tiddy Mun's Curse and the Ecological Consequences of Land Reclamation", Darwin Horn argues that all but one of Tiddy Mun's specific curses may be connected to misfortune and disease brought about by the effect of draining the fenland.

== Description ==
The Tiddy Mun was described, by folklorist M.C. Balfour in 1891, as being no bigger than a three-year-old child, but looking like an old man with long, tangled white hair and a matted white beard. He is said to have worn a grey gown so that at dusk he was difficult to see. His laughter was said to resemble the call of the peewit.

== The Tiddy people ==
Writing in 1955, folklorist E. H. Rudkin also records another Ancholme Valley belief of an imp-like race of beings who were generally considered mischievous but benevolent. They were 'called the Tiddy people', but also the Strangers, Greencoaties and Yarthkins. The 'Tiddy' name related to their size and Rudkin quotes a source describing them: 'They be tiddy critturs, no more than a span high, wi' arms an' legs as thin as thread, but great big feet an' hands, an' heads rollin' aboot on their shoulders'.

The Tiddy people would dance, by moonlight, on large flat stones, known as Strangers Stones, found in the area. Rudkin records a local tradition of smearing the stones with blood and lighting fires on them, but was unable to determine a meaning, or specific belief, behind the practice. The first of the crops would also be left on the Strangers Stones, as well as bread and salt, to keep the Tiddy people happy and ensure a good harvest.

== Tiddy Mun Bridge ==
In 2022 the upgraded bridge on the A47 at Guyhirn was officially opened and named Tiddy Mun Bridge. A competition to name the bridge was won by 13 year-old Ava McCulloch.

== References in popular culture ==
- In his 2013 paper "Caliban and the Fen Demons of Lincolnshire: The Englishness of Shakespeare's Tempest", Dr Todd Andrew Borlik identifies Tiddy Mun as a possible inspiration for Caliban in William Shakespeare's The Tempest.
