= Wisbech St Mary railway station =

Former railway station in Cambridgeshire, England

Coordinates: 52.6557°N 0.1008°E

Wisbech St Mary
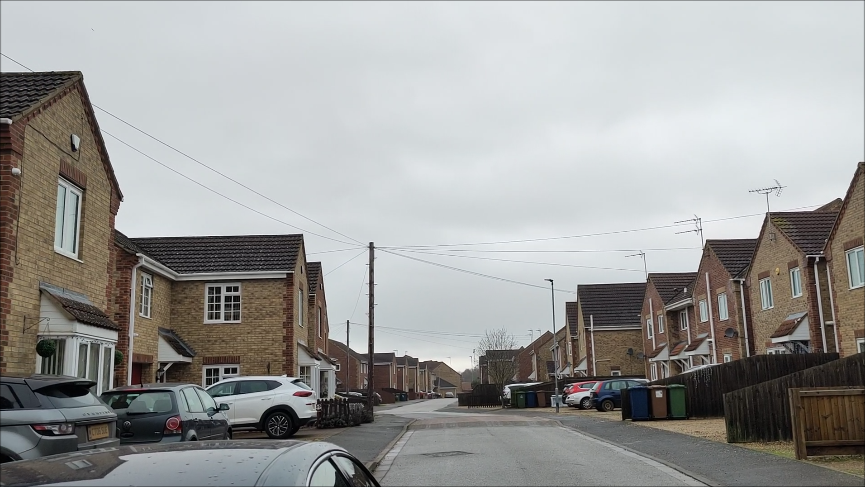
- Beechings Close, which now occupies the old station site and trackbed.

General information
- Location: Wisbech, Fenland; England
- Platforms: 2

Other information
- Status: Disused

History
- Original company: Peterborough, Wisbeach and Sutton Railway
- Pre-grouping: Midland and Great Northern Joint Railway
- Post-grouping: Midland and Great Northern Joint Railway

Key dates
- 1 Aug 1866: Opened as Wisbeach St Mary
- 4 May 1877: Renamed; Wisbech St Mary
- 2 Mar 1959: Closed for passengers
- 28 December 1964: closed for freight
Location

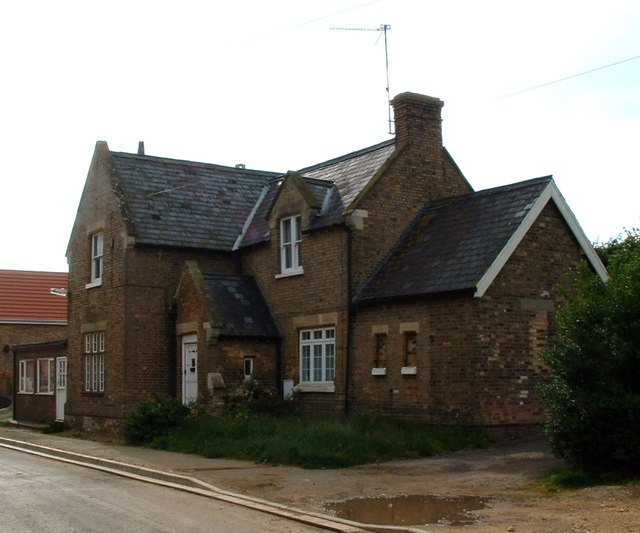
The former station building before it was demolished.

Wisbech St Mary railway station was a station on the Midland and Great Northern Joint Railway line between Wisbech and Peterborough. Located in Wisbech St. Mary, it is now closed.

The station building is no longer standing, having been demolished in around 2006 to make way for a new housing development on Beechings Close.

Preceding station	Disused railways	Following station
Murrow East	Midland and Great Northern; Peterborough Line	Wisbech North
