= Ring's End Local Nature Reserve =

Nature reserve in Cambridgeshire, England

Coordinates: 52°35′37″N 0°04′15″E

Ring's End
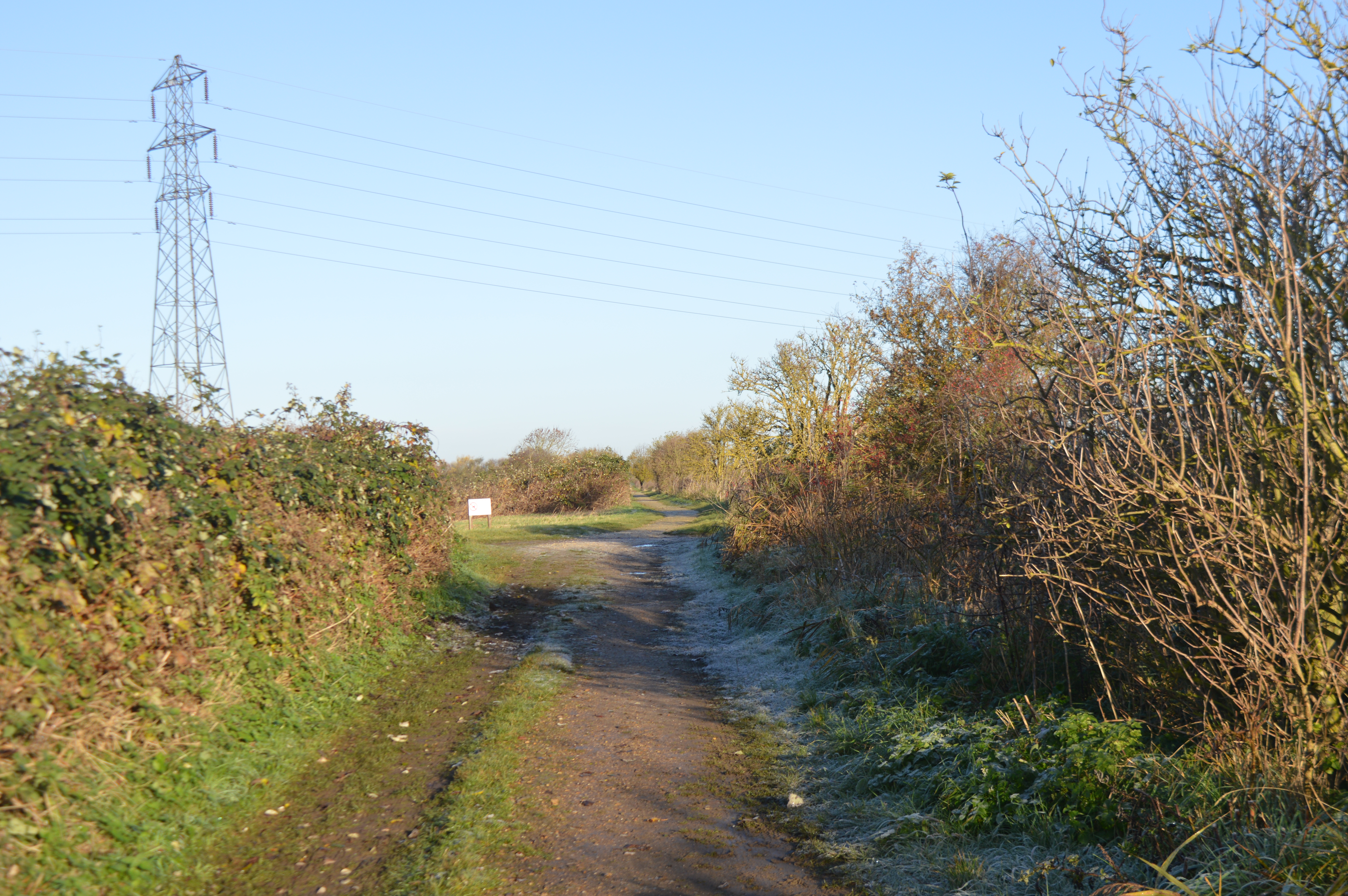
- Interactive map of Ring's End
- Type: Local Nature Reserve
- Location: March, Cambridgeshire
- OS grid: TF 402 017
- Area: 8.5 hectares (21 acres)
- Manager: Cambridgeshire County Council

Ring's End is an 11 hectare Local Nature Reserve which runs south from the hamlet of Ring's End towards March in the Isle of Ely, Cambridgeshire. It is owned by Cambridgeshire County Council, and managed by the Friends of Ring's End Nature Reserve Group. Ring's End is known as a 'post-industrial habitat' since it is reclaimed industrial land.

This is a linear site along a disused railway embankment, with views over the Fens. There are also three ponds, reedbeds and areas of scrub. The soil is poor in nutrients, which has allowed uncommon flowering plants such as coltsfoot to become established. Trees include ash and white willow.

The southern end of the site can be accessed from Twenty Foot Road, and National Cycle Route 63 runs through it. There is no access to the northern end.
