= Cowbit railway station =

Former railway station in Lincolnshire, England

Cowbit
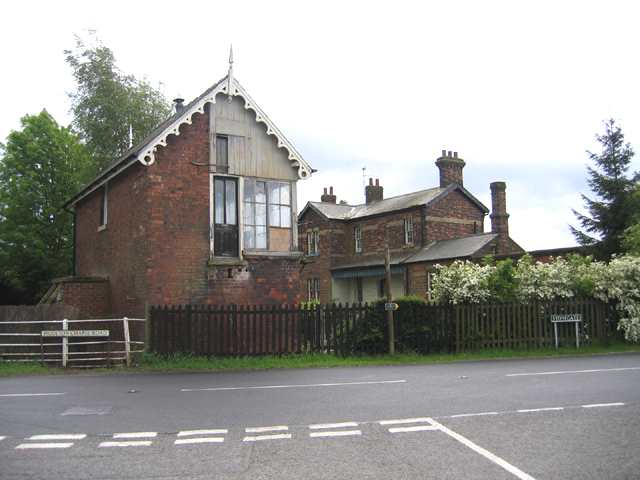
- Former signal box and station building at Cowbit

General information
- Location: Cowbit, South Holland; England
- Coordinates: 52.7449°N 0.1256°W
- Grid reference: TF266179
- Platforms: 2

Other information
- Status: Disused

History
- Original company: Great Northern Railway
- Pre-grouping: Great Northern and Great Eastern Joint Railway
- Post-grouping: London and North Eastern Railway

Key dates
- 2 September 1867: Station opened
- 11 September 1961: Station closed to passengers
- 5 October 1964: closed for freight
Location

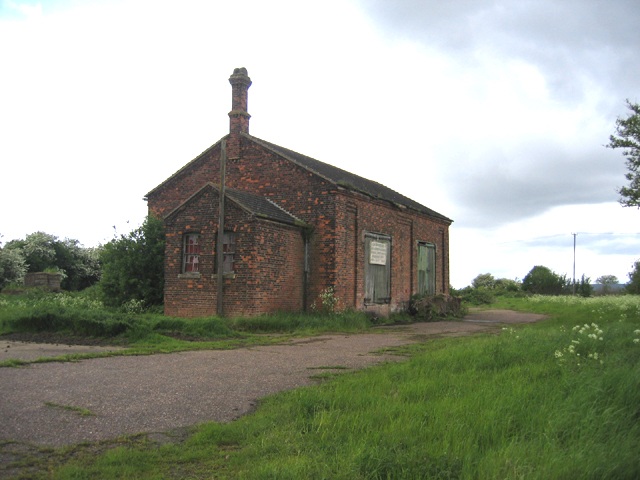
Former Goods shed at Cowbit

Cowbit railway station was a station in Cowbit, Lincolnshire, England. It was located on the route between Spalding and March.

== History ==
The station was opened by the Great Northern Railway on 2 September 1867. It was closed by British Railways on 11 September 1961. It was a frequent 'best kept garden' finalist in the 1950s. Despite extensive resignalling and installation of lifting boom barriers at the level crossing serving the Cowbit-Moulton Chapel main road in the summer of 1976, the March-Spalding line was closed on the late evening Saturday 27 November 1982 following the passage of Class 40 diesel No. 40024 Lucania on a northbound charter special. Tracklifting took place in two stages over the next three years: in autumn 1983 the Up line to March was lifted whilst the Down line to Spalding was lifted in summer 1985, mainly employing Class 31s and the Spalding pilot 08 shunter. The level crossing itself was resurfaced on 1 November 1985.

From 18 to 23 April 1977, Cowbit Up goods loop was the location of an episode of BBC Television's Life at Stake series. British Railways Standard Corridor Nos. W26121 and E24620, together with Brake Standard Corridor No. E35256, were repainted on one side in the colours of a Netherlands Railways commuter train to carry out a re-enactment of the 1975 Dutch train hostage crisis. Two Class 31 diesel-electrics from March depot provided the motive power.

The station buildings all survive in private ownership, the main station building has now been fully renovated, and work on converting the signal box (owned separately from the main building) into a private house has been ongoing for some years. Many of the signs from the building and box survive in private ownership. The former waiting shelter on the platform opposite the main station building has been converted into a dog grooming parlour trading under the name of "Paws at the Station".

In December 2018, outline planning permission was granted to Messrs Bacon & Drury for a development of 45 homes on land north of the station either side of Mill Drove South. The scheme would involve new homes being built on the former trackbed and the demolition of the goods shed since it is not a listed building.

== Future reinstatement ==
The trackbed has been built on south and north of the station thus inhibiting reinstatement of the route on its original alignment. Additionally, the alignment to the south has also been breached by the new A16 bypass road. While Railtrack stated that the route is in its long-term plans for reinstatement because of the revival of the freight business, redevelopment continued unabated.

Preceding station	Disused railways	Following station
Postland; Line and station closed	GN and GE Joint Railway	Spalding; Line closed, station open
