= Guyhirn =

Village in Cambridgeshire, England

Coordinates: 52.617°N 0.067°E

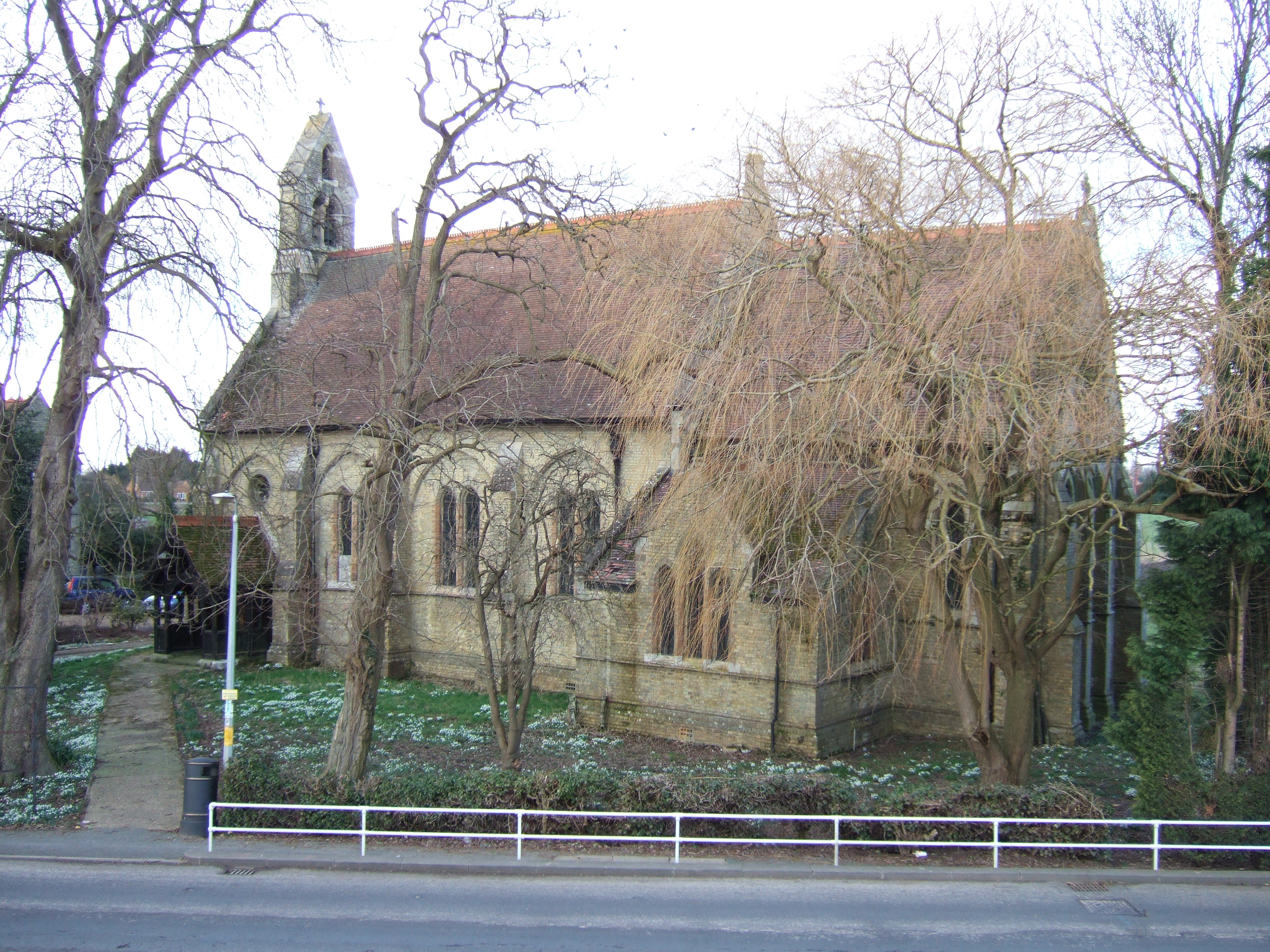
- Church of St Mary Magdalene

- Location within Cambridgeshire
- OS grid reference: TF399041
- Shire county: Cambridgeshire
- Region: East
- Country: England
- Sovereign state: United Kingdom
- Post town: WISBECH
- Postcode district: PE13
- Dialling code: 01945

Guyhirn (sometimes spelled Guyhirne) is a village near the town of Wisbech in Cambridgeshire, England. It is on the northern bank, the North Brink, of the River Nene, at the junction of the A141 with the A47. The population is included in the civil parish of Wisbech St Mary. It is notable chiefly for the Chapel of Ease, a rare example of church architecture of the Interregnum (1649–1660), and as a key crossing point of the River Nene.

== History ==
To the north of the village on "a high spit of silt land, stretching from Selwyn Corner, over the Murrow road and out into the fen lands at Gull Drove" Roman pottery and coins have been found, which are held at the Wisbech & Fenland Museum.

According to A Dictionary of British Place Names, Guyhirn, which was 'La Gyerne' in 1275, derives from the Old French 'guie', which means "a guide" (referencing the control of tidal flow or a "salt-water ditch"), with the Old English 'hyrne', which means an "angle or corner of land".

According to folklore, recorded in the early 19th century, Guyhirn was the site of "a severe engagement between a Saxon King and the abbot of Ely ... the legend informs us that 5000 men were brought into the field ... it arose from disputes respecting the boundaries of property."

In 1585 Guyhirn was visited by the plague.

=== Drainage of the Fens ===
Guyhirn was an important location in the draining of the natural wetlands of the Fens.

==== Middle Ages ====
In the middle ages Guyhirn was situated at the confluence of the Old South Eau river, flowing southward from Clough's Cross, and the Great Wisbech River, flowing north-eastward to Wisbech and the Wash. Almost the whole of the North Level drained into the Great Wisbech River at Guyhirn. The Fenland between these rivers, to the north of Guyhirn, was drained in the 13th century. Following disastrous floods in 1236 and 1246, the banks along the river from Wisbech to Guyhirn were raised, together with the Old South Eau banks (also known as Fendyke or Murrow Bank) from Guyhirn to Clough's Cross.

A breach of the Old South Eau Bank, between Guyhirn and Murrow, in 1437 "flooded 12,000 acres in Wisbech, Leverington, Newton and Tydd." The site of the breach is marked by the sharp bend in the otherwise straight road to Murrow, where "the Great Gull, a great pit ... [from which] earth was scooped out to block up the breach in the bank". This road is now named Gull Drove. (Gull, though now obsolete, in the 15th century meant "a breach or fissure made by a torrent.) This is sharp bend is named as 'Horse Shoe Gull' on the 1824 Ordnance Survey map.

In 1438 Henry VI ordered the Bishop of Thorney to repair and cleanse the Old South Eau from Clough's Cross to Guyhirn.

==== Early Modern Period ====
Morton's Leam, one of the oldest fenland drains, the course of which runs in a straight line for twelve miles from Stanground, has its outfall at Guyhirn. It was commissioned by John Morton, Bishop of Ely, in the late 15th century and completed in 1480. It was dug by prisoners from the Hundred Years War. This had the effect of reducing the risk of bank failure along the Old South Eau. Bishop Morton erected a tower house to oversee his new drain on the opposite bank of the River Nene at Ring's End.

==== Modern Period ====
During the draining of the Great Level by Cornelius Vermuyden in the mid-17th century, not only was Morton's Leam improved but two additional drains, Bevill's Leam from Whittlesey Mere, and Peakirk Drain from Peterborough, had their outfalls at Guyhirn.

==== Huguenot Settlement ====
As a consequence, in the 17th and 18th century Calvinist Huguenot families, including the Culys, Snushells, Delahoi, Sargisons and Tegerdines, settled in Guyhirn to drain outlying levels. They most probably came from the Huguenot settlement at Thorney. Some of these families went on to farm the reclaimed land. It has been speculated that the Guyhirn Chapel of Ease was built as a result of their influence or that its simplicity was a factor in their resettlement.

=== War memorial ===
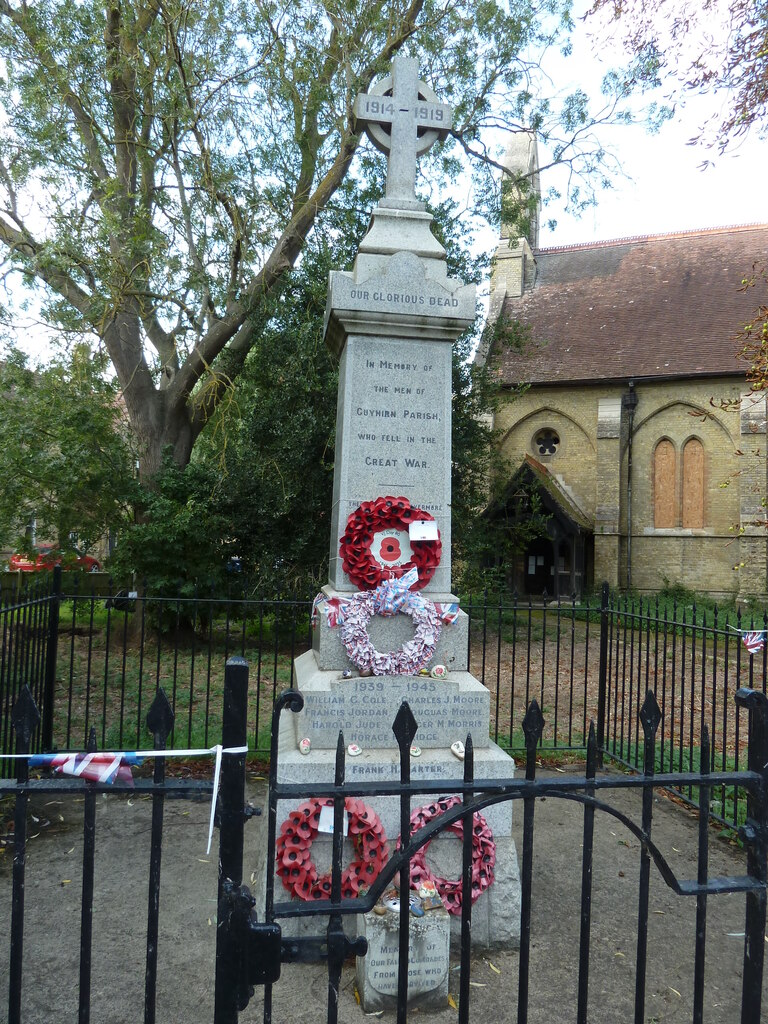
The war memorial, next to the redundant church of St Mary Magdalene

A war memorial of polished granite ("Cross on tapering square pier with black lettering to pier and stepped base") was inaugurated in 1922 on the south side of the High Road opposite Gull Drove. In 1990, it was relocated to the grounds of St Mary Magdalene's Church because of the diversion of the A47 necessitated by the erection of the new bridge.

== River crossing ==
A river ferry crossing, "operated from the Ferry Boat Inn" between Guyhirn and Ring's End, is mentioned in numerous newspaper reports of accidents and drownings, often as a result of intoxication. Until its demolition in 1990 for the widening of the A141 for the building of the new road bridge, the Ferry Boat Inn stood on the South Brink, the river's southern bank.

In 1855 the Nene Valley Commissioners erected two dams on the River Nene above Wisbech, one of them at Guyhirn, at a cost of £40,000. The dam at Guyhirn had an opening of only twelve feet, which was traversable by a "footway of planks". This was reduced to one-plank in width to deter evasion of the ferry, but in October 1857, Mrs Woolsey, the wife of the dam-keeper, fell from it and was drowned.

One effect of the dams was to cause the river to silt up below them and, as a consequence, trade at Wisbech port was “nearly annihilated”. The Wisbech Corporation sued for the dams' removal in what became known locally as ‘the Battle of the Dams’. After a favourable court decision on Friday 29 January 1859, the dams were demolished by a gang of “several hundreds of persons” from Wisbech. The dam at Guyhirn was “cleared away” between the early hours of Sunday 31 January and the afternoon of Tuesday 2 February 1859.

Guyhirne railway station on the Great Northern and Great Eastern Joint Railway was opened in 1867. The railway required the building of the first bridge across both Morton's Leam and the River Nene. The railway bridge incorporated a footbridge, which allowed free passage between Guyhirn and Ring's End for pedestrians.

The first road bridge across the Nene at Guyhirn was officially opened by Sir W. H. Clarke, Chairman of the Isle of Ely County Council, on 22 April 1925. It was the result of a decades long campaign led by local county councillors William Weston and Richard Payne. The bridge's total span was 180 feet, it was built by Messrs Baldry, Yerburgh & Hutchinson and made of reinforced concrete with wrought iron railings each side of the roadway, which was 20 feet wide. This bridge was officially closed on 5 October 1990. The current road bridge carrying the A47 across the river, was officially opened on 10 October 1990 by Malcolm Moss, MP for North East Cambridgeshire. It was built by Beazer Construction East Anglia, of Wisbech, at a cost of £3.65 million. The upgraded roundabout was opened in 2022 and the bridge named Tiddy Mun Bridge by 13 year-old schoolgirl Ava MCulloch.

== Religion ==
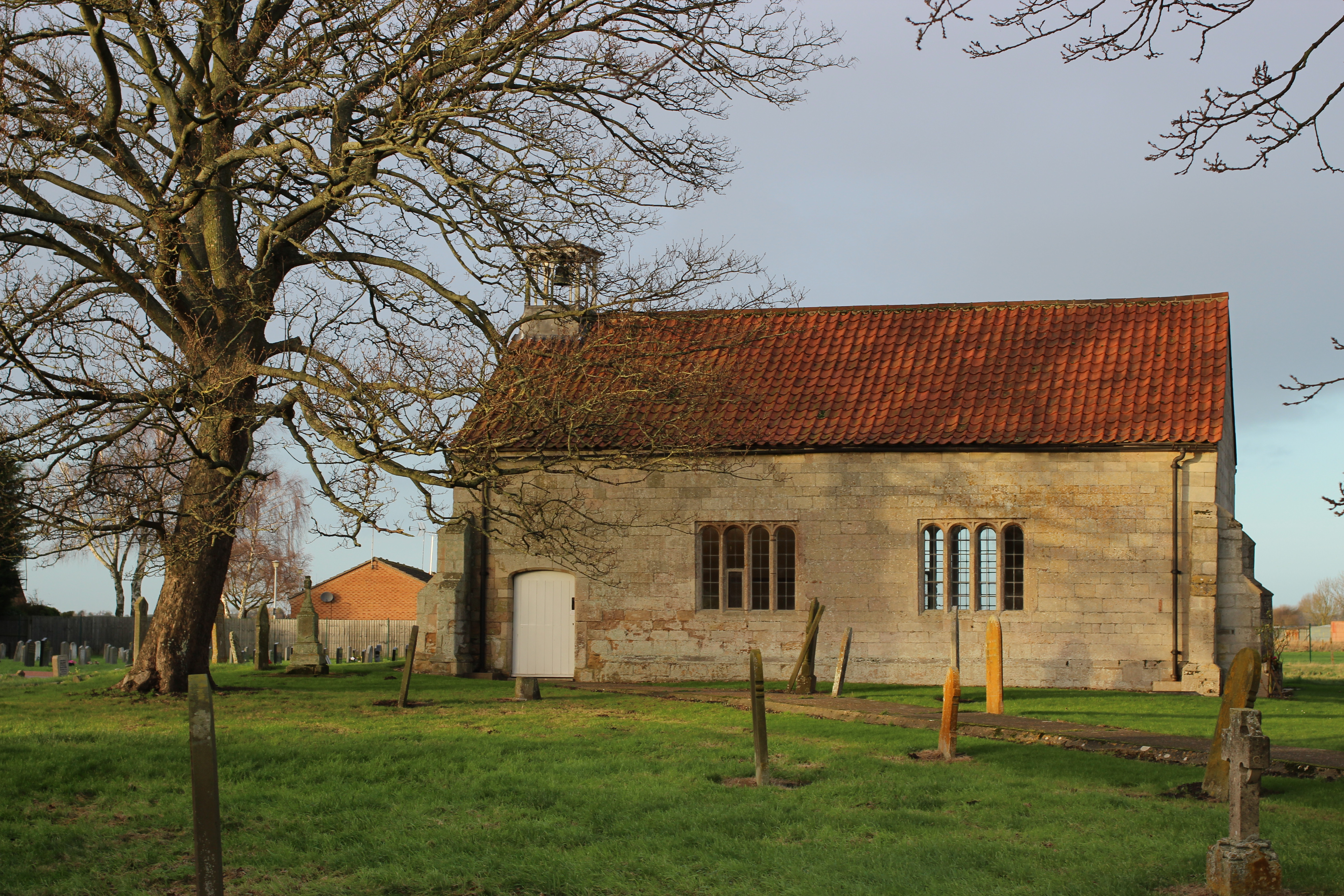
Chapel of Ease

The first chapel in Guyhirn originated in a chantry founded in 1337 by John de Reddik. It was dedicated to St Mary Magdalen and was licensed for public worship in 1398. In 1406 the chaplain was Sir John Grey. A guild to St Mary Magdalen was active in Guyhirn in the 16th century and such guilds were often established to pay for a chaplaincy. One year after the dissolution of the chantries in 1548, the chapel's endowments and property were sold to William Ward. The dismissed chaplain, William Susan, received an annual pension of three pounds and ten shillings per annum. In 1877 "quantities of fine chiselled stone" were unearthed during the construction of the extant church, suggesting that this stands on or close to the location of the earlier chapel. In the 1950s some of these stones could be found bordering the vicarage drive and in village gardens.

The village was without a place of worship for over a century until Guyhirn Chapel of Ease was commissioned during the Commonwealth. However, it was not completed until 1660 when the Restoration had returned Anglicanism as the official religious observance. It is recorded in the National Heritage List for England as a designated Grade II* listed building, and is in the care of the Churches Conservation Trust.

Between the 17th and early 19th centuries, Guyhirn was home to a sect of religious dissenters known as the Culimites. They were named after their founder, David Culy, the son of a Huguenot family whose theology was said to differ little from that of the Anabaptists. However a more recent reappraisal concluded that "he was an Independent minister close to the Reformed tradition of his French ancestors. The adherents "met in a chapel which Culy, reputed to have been a wealthy farmer and landowner, built on his own property".

This same building was later the Baptists meeting house, but by the 20th century was no longer a place of worship. In the 1950s, it still stood and was known as The Institute, and was "the nightly rendezvous of about 40 young men who play billiards, darts and snooker there, or go merely to chat and drink a mineral around the stove with their chums."

A Methodist Chapel was built in 1849 and rebuilt in 1868 by the Primitive Methodists with pews for 147 worshipers. It was sited next to the current village hall, but has been demolished. In a newspaper article of 1854 the coming of "Wesleyanism" to Guyhirn was credited with a striking improvement in the conduct of its residents: "To those who knew the locality a few years since, the moral and social improvement is most striking. Formerly proverbial for vice and immorality, the inhabitants are now distinguished for sobriety and piety."

Formerly within the parish of Wisbech St Mary, Guyhirn (with Rings End) was made a parish in its own right in 1870. Its first vicar was Rev. W. A. Carpenter.. The parish church of St Mary Magdalene was built in 1878. It was designed by architect George Gilbert Scott for his older brother, Canon John Scott of Wisbech. It was constructed of gault brick with stone dressings, with a timber porch and western bell cote. Since 31 October 1983 it has been designated a Grade II listed building. Declared redundant in 2005, it was put up for sale in 2018 for £75,000.

== Education ==
Supported by the National Society, Guyhirn School opened in 1875. In 1937 "extensive alterations ... [were] made at a cost of over £1000." The school was formally reopened by the Bishop of Ely, Bernard Heywood, on 31 July 1937. It remains "a small, family centered [sic] Church of England Primary School that is committed to promoting our Christian values."

== In popular culture ==
In Charles Kingsley's novel Alton Locke, he refers to Guyhirn, as Guy Hall, and describes the bodies of "two Irish reapers ... hanging in chains by Wisbeach River." This is based on the murder of William Marriot and attempted murder of his wife, of Wisbech High Fen, in 1795. Four Irishmen employed as harvesters were convicted, executed and two of their bodies hung from gibbets on the river bank at Guyhirn. The other two bodies were sent for dissection by surgeons. Part of one gibbet was eventually put on display in Wisbech and Fenland Museum.

== Notable residents ==
David Culy (c. 1655 – c. 1725), Christian sectary and author. Culy was born to Huguenot parents, who had moved to Guyhirn from Thorney. Though there is no record of his education, he was likely bilingual as he quoted from a French translation of the Bible. He converted at March in 1687 under the influence of Francis Holcroft (c. 1629 – c. 1692). He founded his church at Guyhirn in 1695, which at the time of death was estimated to number more than 700 adherents; "most of the inhabitants of [Guyhirn] became his followers, and many also from Whittlesea, Wisbech St. Mary's, Outwell and Upwell". Other Culimite congregations were established in Rothwell, Soham and Isleham. As a result Culy was later known as the 'Bishop of Guyhirn'. In 1726 his writings were published in three parts, the first part of which was reprinted in 1800 and 1820.

Margaret George (1899–1983), social documentary photographer. Margaret was the daughter of the Rev. Maurice George, who became vicar of Guyhirn & Ring's End in 1918. She was given her first camera at twelve years of age. She photographed the daily life of the village from workers in the fields to mothers holding their newborns. She exhaustively dated and annotated her photographs, even naming animals. These were archived in albums. Her collection is now held by the Wisbech & Fenland Museum, where an exhibition of her photographs opened on 27 September 2025, running to 8 November 2025.

Alderman John William Payne J.P., (born Guyhirn, 22 September 1887; died, Wisbech, 12 July 1959) was a Liberal politician, a champion of public education, and of smallholders, in the former county of the Isle of Ely and in East Anglia. A farmer, businessman, Primitive Methodist preacher and administrator, he was twice Liberal parliamentary candidate for Cambridgeshire (1929 and 1935) and, reportedly, a personal friend of David Lloyd George. For 29 years he was Chairman of the Isle of Ely County Council Education Committee, and was credited with greatly advancing public education, including the establishment of Isle College, Wisbech. Following his death, the streets of Wisbech were lined with mourners for his funeral, and over 700 mourners attended a memorial service at Ely Cathedral. The Payne School (now the Alderman Payne School) at Parson Drove, opened in 1933, was named for him.

== See also ==
- Guyhirne railway station
- Guyhirn Chapel of Ease
