= Guyhirne railway station =

Former railway station in Cambridgeshire, England

Coordinates: 52.6039°N 0.0627°E

Guyhirne
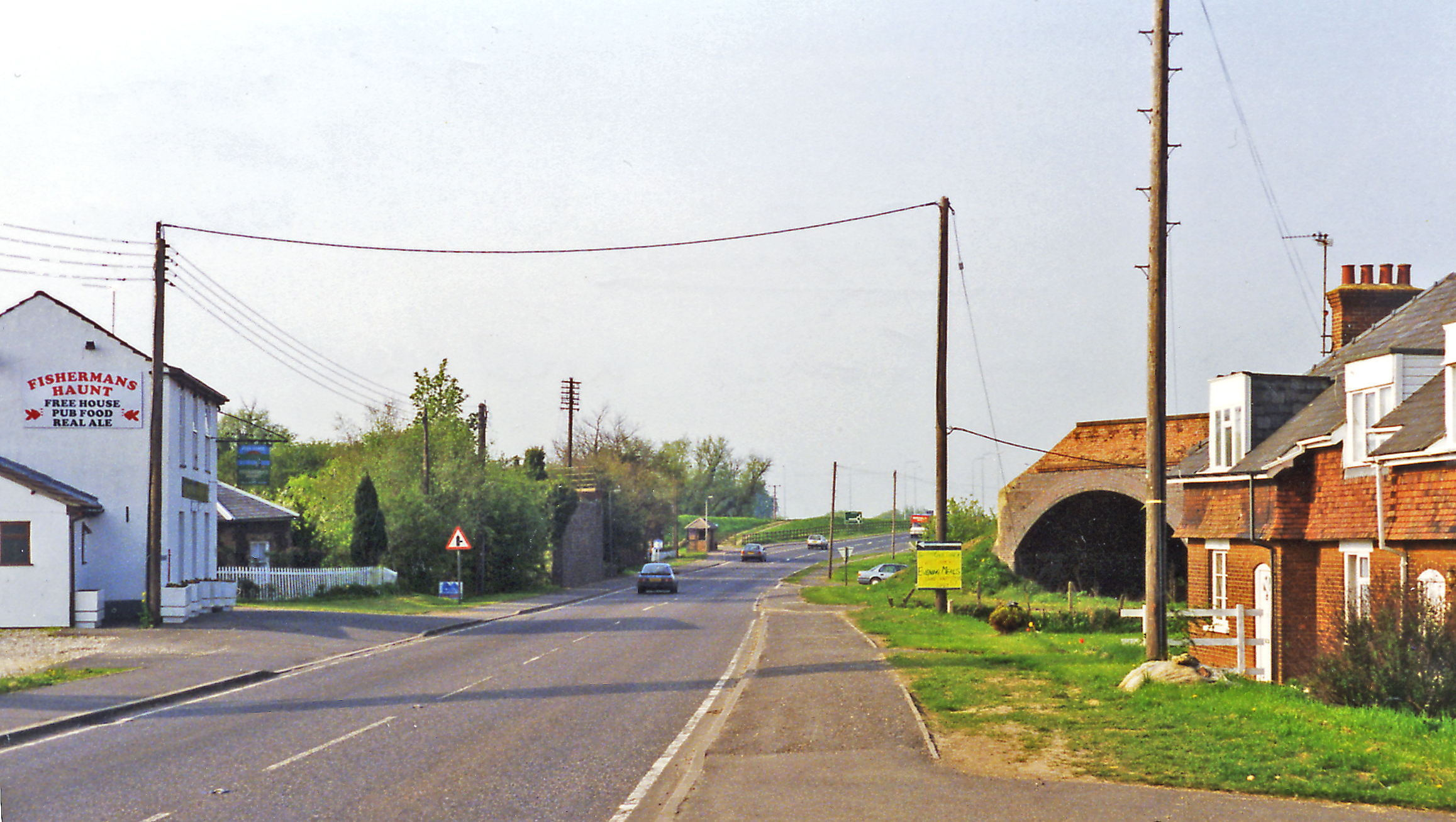
- Station site in 1995

General information
- Location: Guyhirn, Fenland; England
- Platforms: 2

Other information
- Status: Disused

History
- Original company: Great Northern Railway
- Pre-grouping: Great Northern and Great Eastern Joint Railway
- Post-grouping: London and North Eastern Railway

Key dates
- 2 September 1867: Opened
- 5 October 1953: Closed for passengers
- 5 October 1964: closed for freight
Location

Guyhirne railway station was a station at Ring's End, near Guyhirn, Cambridgeshire on the Great Northern and Great Eastern Joint Railway between Spalding and March. It was opened originally by the GNR in 1867. An auction took place in 1867 of items linked to the construction of the railway. It was closed to passengers by the British Transport Commission, due to low usage, in 1953.

Goods traffic continued at the station until 1964, whilst the line passing through it remained open until November 1982. The station has since been demolished, along with the viaduct that carried the line through the village it served.

Former Services

Preceding station	Disused railways	Following station
March	GN and GE Joint Railway	Murrow West
