= Postland railway station =

Former railway station in Lincolnshire, England

Coordinates: 52.6953°N 0.0901°W

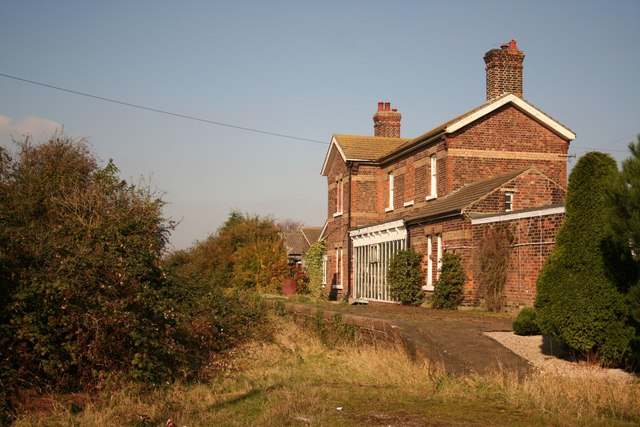
Former station building

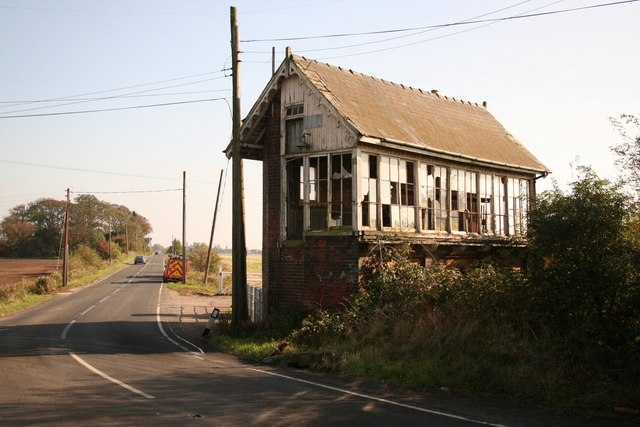
Former signal box

Postland railway station was a station on the Great Northern and Great Eastern Joint Railway in Crowland, Lincolnshire, which is now closed. It took its name from the Postland estate, owned by the Marquess of Exeter. Services to Cambridge and Doncaster ran from here.

== History ==
It originally opened on 2 September 1867 as Crowland, and was renamed to Postland on 1 December four years later. It remained open to passengers until 1961. The last goods trains through the station ran in November 1982, and the station was closed permanently in 1965.

In July 1936, a serious accident took place at the station, involving Ex-GNR Class H4 2-6-0 No. 2764.

The closest stations for passengers from Crowland and the surrounding area are now either Spalding railway station or Peterborough railway station. The closure of the station was not related to the Beeching axe of the same era.

The former signal box inspired the subject of Dr Jane Reid's artwork The Last Signal Box, which won the Drawing Award in Jackson's Art Prize 2026.

Preceding station	Disused railways	Following station
French Drove & Gedney Hill; Line and station closed	Great Northern and Great Eastern	Cowbit; Line and station closed

== Bibliography ==
- Quick, Michael (2023). Railway Passenger Stations in Great Britain: A Chronology (PDF) (5th ed.). London: Railway and Canal Historical Society.
