= Murrow, Cambridgeshire =

Village in Cambridgeshire, England

Coordinates: 52.633°N 0.033°E

Murrow
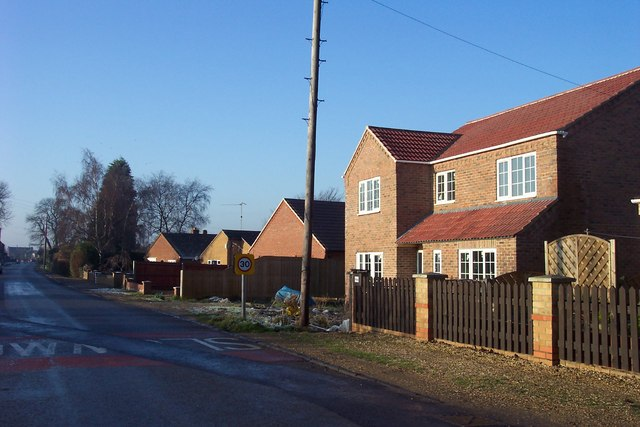
- Houses in Murrow

- Location within Cambridgeshire
- OS grid reference: TF376059
- Shire county: Cambridgeshire
- Region: East
- Country: England
- Sovereign state: United Kingdom
- Post town: Wisbech
- Postcode district: PE13

Murrow is a village in the civil parish of Wisbech St Mary, in Cambridgeshire, England.

The village is on Murrow Bank, the B1187 road, 5 miles (8 km) west from the town of Wisbech. Its population is included in the civil parish of Parson Drove. Murrow has a village store, and The Bell Inn public house which is owned by Elgood's Brewery.

== History ==
In 1376, Murrow was written as 'Morrowe' and derives from Old English mor (marsh) and raw (row) of houses.

The Early English style Corpus Christi chapel was erected in 1857, built by Rev. Henry Jackson at his own expense.

Murrow was part of the ecclesiastical parish of Wisbech St Mary, formed under the 1870 Leverington Rectory Act. Emmanuel church was built in 1873 during the incumbency of Rev. A.W. Roper.

Formerly the village contained orchards and produced bulbs.

Murrow once had two railway stations, Murrow East on the M&GNJR, and Murrow West on GN&GEJR. As it had two stations, Murrow also had a Station Road (originally Mill Road, renamed Station Road, and renamed back to Mill Road), and a Station Avenue.
