= Murrow West railway station =

Former railway station in Cambridgeshire, England

Coordinates: 52.6384°N 0.021°E

Murrow West
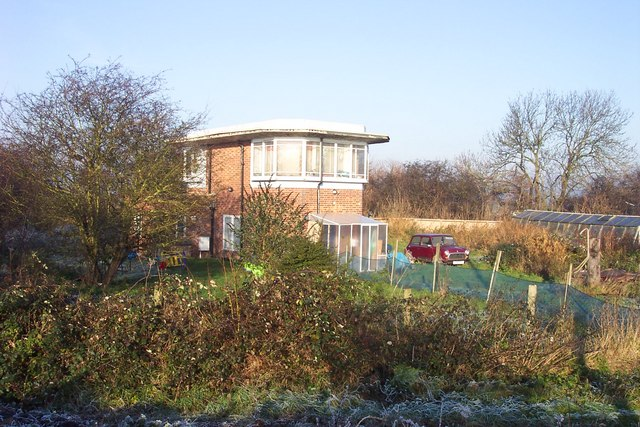
- Former signal box now converted into a house

General information
- Location: Murrow, Fenland; England
- Platforms: 2

Other information
- Status: Disused

History
- Original company: Great Northern Railway
- Pre-grouping: Great Northern and Great Eastern Joint Railway
- Post-grouping: London and North Eastern Railway

Key dates
- 2 September 1867: Opened as Murrow
- 27 September 1948: Renamed Murrow West
- 6 July 1953: Closed
Location

Murrow West railway station was a station on the Great Northern and Great Eastern Joint Railway in Murrow, Cambridgeshire between Spalding, England, and March. It opened in 1867 and was closed by the British Transport Commission in July 1953 due to low usage. The line itself survived until its closure by British Rail in November 1982. The station has mostly been demolished although the signal box still survives, having been converted into a private dwelling after the closure of the line and subsequent removal of the track.

A second station for the village, Murrow East railway station, was situated on the Midland and Great Northern Joint Railway a short distance away - this route intersected the GN&GE Joint line on the level immediately to the north of Murrow West station and signal box.

| Preceding station | Disused railways | Following station |
|---|---|---|
| Guyhirne | Great Northern and Great Eastern | French Drove & Gedney Hill |
