= Murrow East railway station =

Former railway station in Cambridgeshire, England

Coordinates: 52.6403°N 0.0282°E

Murrow East
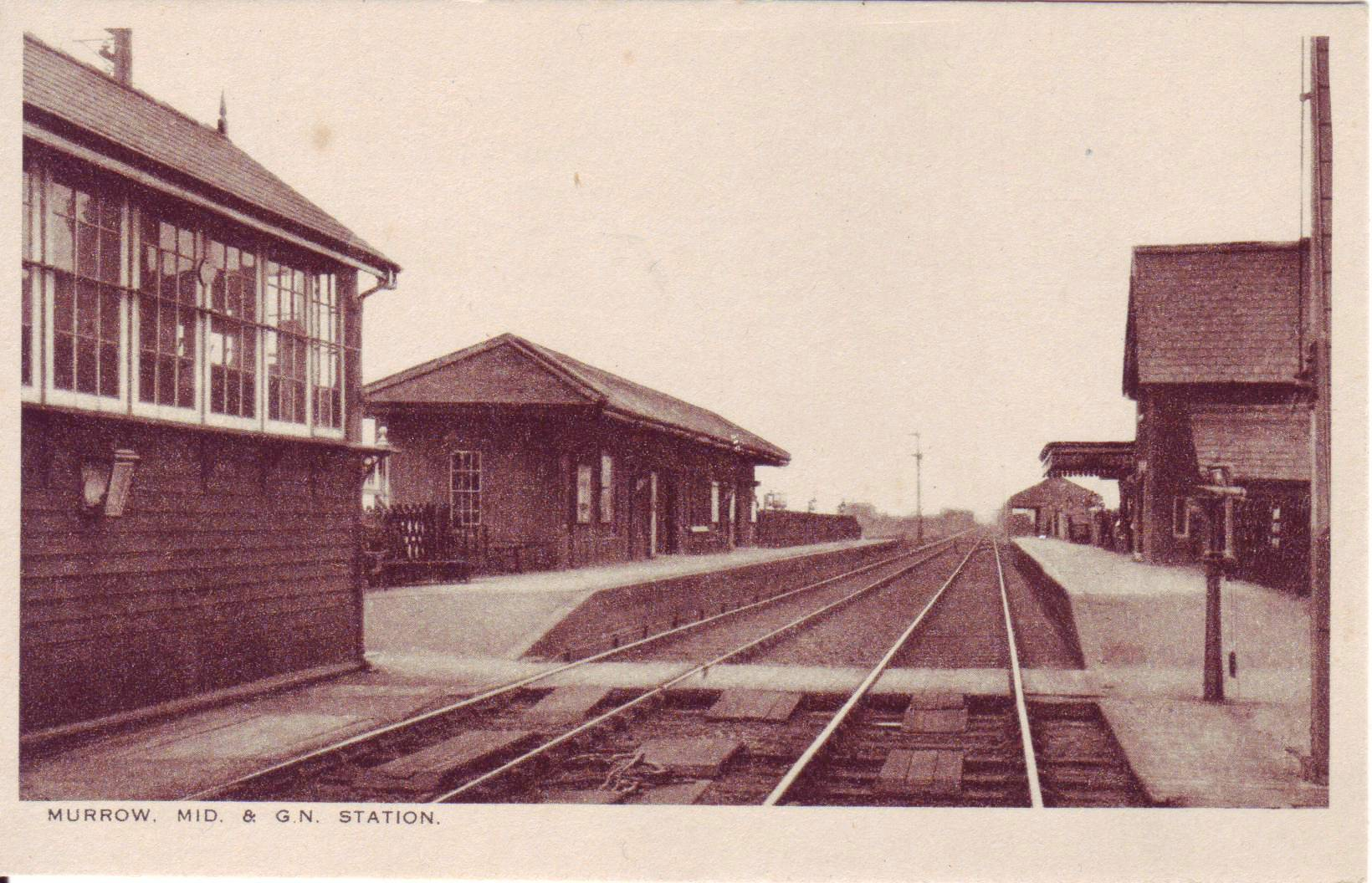
- Station in early 1900s.

General information
- Location: Murrow, Fenland; England
- Platforms: 2

Other information
- Status: Disused

History
- Original company: Peterborough, Wisbeach and Sutton Railway
- Pre-grouping: Midland and Great Northern Joint Railway
- Post-grouping: Midland and Great Northern Joint Railway

Key dates
- 1 Aug 1866: Opened as Murrow
- 27 Sep 1948: Renamed; Murrow East
- 2 Mar 1959: Closed for passengers
- 19 April 1965: closed for freight
Location

Murrow East railway station was a station in Murrow, Cambridgeshire. It was on the Midland and Great Northern Joint Railway line between Wisbech and Peterborough. There was another station in the settlement, Murrow West railway station, on the Great Northern and Great Eastern Joint Railway.

Preceding station	Disused railways	Following station
Wryde	Midland and Great Northern; Peterborough Line	Wisbech St Mary
