= Norwich Sports Village =

Grade II listed sports centre complex in Norfolk, England

Coordinates: 52.6547°N 1.2632°E

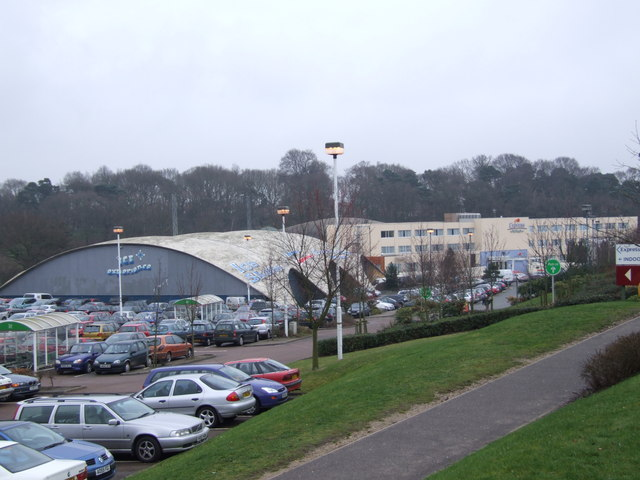
- Norwich Sports Village in 2007
- Interactive map of the Norwich Sports Village area

General information
- Location: Broadland, Norfolk, England
- Grid position: TG2082311289, TG2082311289
- Construction started: 1987
- Completed: 1991
- Opened: 1988
- Cost: £11.75 million
- Owner: David Lloyd Leisure

Design and construction
- Architect: Heinz Isler
- Architecture firm: Copeland Associates, Haus and Herd
- Designations

Listed Building – Grade II
- Official name: Norwich Sports Village: comprising the sports hall, the former ice rink and the swimming pool
- Designated: 12 January 2026
- Reference no.: 1493666

Website
- www.davidlloyd.co.uk/clubs/norwich

Norwich Sports Village is a Grade II listed sports centre complex in Broadland, slightly north-west of, and outside, the city boundary of Norwich, Norfolk, England. Initially consisting of two ranges comprising a total of nine "inverted membrane" concrete shells designed by the Swiss structural engineer Heinz Isler in 1987, it opened in 1988. Its six-shell range was originally used for racquet sports, and its three-shell range for various events. In 1991 another square concrete-shell building was added to house a swimming pool. The complex is now owned by David Lloyd Leisure, though the three-shell range remains disused as of 2025.

== History ==
The Norwich Sports Village was developed in response to a need perceived by the local authority in the 1980s for facilities that holidaymakers in the Broads could use in wet weather, as well as for residents of the local area. The centre was designed in 1987 by the Swiss structural engineer Heinz Isler, and is the only work by Isler in the United Kingdom. The architects were Tony Copeland of Copeland Associates, working in collaboration with the Swiss architects Haus and Herd, for whom Copeland had previously worked in Switzerland for 20 years. Copeland had also collaborated with Isler on other projects at Haus and Herd. The complex was built between 1987 and 1991, costing £11.75 million, with Broadland Council providing the land and investing £3.75 million.

The centre opened in 1988, and was privately run from the outset. The buildings were regarded as well used and successful in their early years, with the six-shell range used mainly for racquet sports and the three-shell range operating variously as a spectator venue for boxing matches and as a space for weddings and functions. In 1991 a swimming pool was added by Isler, using a different design with a square inverted membrane. This was advertised as the Aquapark.

In 2005 the Aquapark closed after the company operating it went into liquidation. That year, Broadland Council sold its freehold in the building for £450,000 to Liana Ltd, a Guernsey-based company with connections to the directors of Eclipse, which held a 150-year lease on the nearby buildings. The David Lloyd Sports Club opened in the tennis hall in the early 21st century, taking over the swimming pool and removing its flumes. In 2009 Planet Ice opened a skating rink in the three-shell range, though this closed in 2012. The three-shell range was purchased by the owners of the rest of the complex in 2021, bringing the whole site back under single ownership. The glazing in the tennis hall and swimming pools was fully renewed in 2024. As of 2025 the three-shell range is disused. The site was given a Grade II listing by the Department for Culture, Media and Sport on the advice of Historic England in 2026, the centenary of Isler's birth. This followed a campaign for the listing by the Twentieth Century Society.

== Architecture ==
The centre is formed by a range of nine "inverted membrane" concrete shells, the only concrete shell structures built in the UK in the 1980s and one of only three such structures built in the country since 1977. It is the only example of a free-form concrete shell in the UK. The nine shells are arranged as a six-shell range and a three-shell range. The initial shells, inspired by hanging cloths, are 100mm thick. There is also a square inverted membrane that houses a swimming pool.

== See also ==
- Listed buildings in Norfolk
