= Listed buildings in Norfolk =

Protected structures in Norfolk, England

There are around 11,000 Listed buildings in Norfolk, which are buildings of architectural or historic interest.

- Grade I buildings are of exceptional interest.
- Grade II* buildings are particularly important buildings of more than special interest.
- Grade II buildings are of special interest.

The lists follow Historic England’s geographical organisation, with entries grouped by county, local authority, and parish (civil and non-civil).

Local authority	Listed buildings list	Grade I	Grade II*	Grade II	Total	Map
Breckland	Listed buildings in Breckland District	112	102	1,380	1,594	
Broadland	Listed buildings in Broadland District	50	78	892	1,020	
Great Yarmouth	Listed buildings in the borough of Great Yarmouth (non civil parish); Listed buildings in the borough of Great Yarmouth (civil parishes)	13	47	371	431	
King's Lynn and West Norfolk	Listed buildings in King's Lynn and West Norfolk	102	135	1,307	1,544	
North Norfolk	Listed buildings in North Norfolk District	94	203	2,060	2,357	
Norwich (non-civil parish)	Listed buildings in Norwich (within the city walls, eastern part); Listed buildings in Norwich (within the city walls, west of the Castle); Listed buildings in Norwich (within the city walls, north of the River Wensum); Listed buildings in Norwich (outside the city walls)	62	126	855	1,043	
South Norfolk	Listed buildings in South Norfolk District	101	153	2,710	2,964	
Total (Norfolk)	—	534	844	9,575	10,953	—

== See also ==
- Grade I listed buildings in Norfolk
- Grade II* listed buildings in Norfolk

== Sources ==
- Wilson, Bill; Pevsner, Nikolaus (1997) [1962], Norfolk 1: Norwich and North-East, The Buildings of England, New Haven and London: Yale University Press, ISBN 978-0-300-09607-1
- Wilson, Bill; Pevsner, Nikolaus (1999) [1962], Norfolk 2: North-West and South, The Buildings of England, New Haven and London: Yale University Press, ISBN 978-0-300-09657-6
