= Listed buildings in Norwich (within the city walls, north of the River Wensum) =

Norwich is city and non-civil parish in Norfolk, England. It contains 62 grade I, 126 grade II* and 855 grade II listed buildings that are recorded in the National Heritage List for England.

This list is based on the information retrieved online from Historic England.

The quantity of listed buildings in Norwich requires subdivision into geographically defined lists. This list includes all listed buildings located within the city walls, north of the River Wensum.

== Key ==
Grade	Criteria
I	Buildings that are of exceptional interest
II*	Particularly important buildings of more than special interest
II	Buildings that are of special interest

== Listing ==
Name	Grade	Location	Type	Completed (Note: The date given is the date used by Historic England as significant for the initial building or that of an important part in the structure's description.)	Date designated	Grid ref. (Note: The grid reference is based on the British national grid reference system, sometimes known as OSGB36, used by the Ordnance Survey.) Geo-coordinates	Notes	Entry number (Note: The "List Entry Number" is a unique number assigned to each listed building and scheduled monument by Historic England.)	Image	Wikidata
77 and 79, Barrack Street	II	77 and 79, Barrack Street			9 February 2000	TG2351209390; 52°38′10″N 1°18′06″E		1380080	Upload Photo	Q26660296
71, Botolph Street	II*	71, Botolph Street			8 April 1986	TG2293909461; 52°38′13″N 1°17′36″E		1051372	Upload Photo	Q17557149
9, Calvert Street	II	9, Calvert Street			8 April 1986	TG2304509084; 52°38′01″N 1°17′41″E		1206042	Upload Photo	Q26501303
11, Calvert Street	II	11, Calvert Street			5 June 1972	TG2304409100; 52°38′02″N 1°17′41″E		1051352	Upload Photo	Q26303236
20, Calvert Street	II	20, Calvert Street			26 February 1954	TG2302609116; 52°38′02″N 1°17′40″E		1206046	Upload Photo	Q26501308
22, Calvert Street	II	22, Calvert Street			5 June 1972	TG2302409128; 52°38′03″N 1°17′40″E		1051350	Upload Photo	Q26303234
Church of St Clement	I	Colegate			26 February 1954	TG2317909044; 52°38′00″N 1°17′48″E		1051282	Upload Photo	Q17537245
Church of St George	I	Colegate			26 February 1954	TG2299509032; 52°38′00″N 1°17′38″E		1206500	Upload Photo	Q17537351
Octagon Chapel	II*	Colegate			26 February 1954	TG2308009071; 52°38′01″N 1°17′43″E		1280186	Upload Photo	Q15263399
Old Meeting House	I	Colegate			26 February 1954	TG2310409107; 52°38′02″N 1°17′44″E		1206474	Upload Photo	Q17537345
3 and 5, Colegate	II	3 and 5, Colegate			5 June 1972	TG2317109074; 52°38′01″N 1°17′47″E		1051317	Upload Photo	Q26303211
7 and 9, Colegate	II	7 and 9, Colegate			5 June 1972	TG2315409066; 52°38′00″N 1°17′47″E		1051318	Upload Photo	Q26303212
11 and 13, Colegate	II	11 and 13, Colegate			5 June 1972	TG2314409062; 52°38′00″N 1°17′46″E		1206469	Upload Photo	Q26501684
15 and 17, Colegate	II	15 and 17, Colegate			5 June 1972	TG2313009053; 52°38′00″N 1°17′45″E		1372752	Upload Photo	Q26653828
18, Colegate	II*	18, Colegate			26 February 1954	TG2311909031; 52°37′59″N 1°17′45″E		1372773	Upload Photo	Q17531239
19 and 19a, Colegate	II	19 and 19a, Colegate			5 June 1972	TG2311409048; 52°38′00″N 1°17′44″E		1051319	Upload Photo	Q26303213
20, Colegate	II*	20, Colegate			26 February 1954	TG2310109022; 52°37′59″N 1°17′44″E		1051283	Upload Photo	Q17557052
22, Colegate	II	22, Colegate			5 June 1972	TG2309009024; 52°37′59″N 1°17′43″E		1372774	Upload Photo	Q26653843
24, Colegate	II	24, Colegate			5 June 1972	TG2308209023; 52°37′59″N 1°17′43″E		1051284	Upload Photo	Q26303191
25 Colegate, Norwich	II	25, Colegate			5 June 1972	TG2307409040; 52°38′00″N 1°17′42″E		1372753	Upload Photo	Q26653829
27 and 29, Colegate	II	27 and 29, Colegate			5 June 1972	TG2306209038; 52°38′00″N 1°17′42″E		1280188	Upload Photo	Q26569352
47, Colegate	II	47, Colegate			5 June 1972	TG2295209019; 52°37′59″N 1°17′36″E		1051321	Upload Photo	Q26303214
49, Colegate	II	49, Colegate			5 June 1972	TG2294309013; 52°37′59″N 1°17′35″E		1206503	Upload Photo	Q26501713
52, Colegate	II	52, Colegate			5 June 1972	TG2292308986; 52°37′58″N 1°17′34″E		1051285	Upload Photo	Q26303192
57a, Colegate	II	57a, Colegate			26 February 1954	TG2288209003; 52°37′59″N 1°17′32″E		1051281	Upload Photo	Q26303190
The Golden Star Public House	II	57, Colegate			26 July 1973	TG2291009004; 52°37′59″N 1°17′33″E		1372772	Upload Photo	Q26653842
5, Cross Lane	II	5, Cross Lane			26 February 1954	TG2300809151; 52°38′03″N 1°17′39″E		1206550	Upload Photo	Q26501754
25-31, Duke Street	II	25-31, Duke Street			5 March 1982	TG2290409019; 52°37′59″N 1°17′33″E		1280184	Upload Photo	Q26569349
Regency House	II	34, Duke Street			26 July 1973	TG2288909005; 52°37′59″N 1°17′32″E		1280156	Upload Photo	Q26569325
57-61, Duke Street	II	57-61, Duke Street			5 March 1982	TG2288409100; 52°38′02″N 1°17′32″E		1372777	Upload Photo	Q26653846
67, Duke Street	II	67, Duke Street			26 February 1954	TG2288009119; 52°38′02″N 1°17′32″E		1206569	Upload Photo	Q26501773
69-89, Duke Street	II	69-89, Duke Street			5 June 1972	TG2288309147; 52°38′03″N 1°17′32″E		1051295	Upload Photo	Q26303202
Howard and Son's Fish Smoke House	II	Fishergate			5 June 1972	TG2322009071; 52°38′00″N 1°17′50″E		1051278	Upload Photo	Q26303188
St Edmunds Church	I	Fishergate			5 June 1972	TG2333509164; 52°38′03″N 1°17′56″E		1051279	Upload Photo	Q17537241
29, Fishergate	II	29, Fishergate			26 February 1954	TG2325809127; 52°38′02″N 1°17′52″E		1025079	Upload Photo	Q26276319
Fye Bridge	II	Fye Bridge Street			5 June 1972	TG2322109010; 52°37′58″N 1°17′50″E		1025090	Upload Photo	Q26276331
2, Fye Bridge Street	II	2, Fye Bridge Street			5 June 1972	TG2318609011; 52°37′59″N 1°17′48″E		1372790	Upload Photo	Q26653851
7 and 9, Fye Bridge Street	II	7 and 9, Fye Bridge Street			5 June 1972	TG2321009048; 52°38′00″N 1°17′49″E		1372771	Upload Photo	Q26653841
The Mischief Tavern	II	8, Fye Bridge Street			26 February 1954	TG2319609024; 52°37′59″N 1°17′49″E		1051242	Upload Photo	Q26303155
11-15, Fye Bridge Street	II*	11-15, Fye Bridge Street			26 February 1954	TG2320509057; 52°38′00″N 1°17′49″E		1025094	Upload Photo	Q17557002
17, Fye Bridge Street	II	17, Fye Bridge Street			5 June 1972	TG2320109065; 52°38′00″N 1°17′49″E		1051280	Upload Photo	Q26303189
19, Fye Bridge Street	II	19, Fye Bridge Street			5 June 1972	TG2319909072; 52°38′00″N 1°17′49″E		1355147	Upload Photo	Q26638027
2-12, Gildencroft	II	2-12, Gildencroft			5 June 1972	TG2287609439; 52°38′13″N 1°17′33″E		1051248	Upload Photo	Q26303159
Doughty's Hospital	II	Golden Dog Lane			26 February 1954	TG2308709257; 52°38′07″N 1°17′43″E		1187193	Upload Photo	Q26482416
10, Golden Dog Lane	II	10, Golden Dog Lane			5 June 1972	TG2307909161; 52°38′04″N 1°17′43″E		1372793	Upload Photo	Q26653854
12, Golden Dog Lane	II	12, Golden Dog Lane			5 June 1972	TG2309309164; 52°38′04″N 1°17′44″E		1187208	Upload Photo	Q26482432
23, Golden Dog Lane	II	23, Golden Dog Lane			5 June 1972	TG2313809191; 52°38′04″N 1°17′46″E		1051250	Upload Photo	Q26303161
26, Golden Dog Lane	II	26, Golden Dog Lane, NR3 1BP			5 June 1972	TG2313809181; 52°38′04″N 1°17′46″E		1051251	Upload Photo	Q26303162
28, Golden Dog Lane	II	28, Golden Dog Lane, NR3 1BP			5 June 1972	TG2314409182; 52°38′04″N 1°17′46″E		1298828	Upload Photo	Q26586274
Printing Museum	II*	Jarrold's Printing Works, Whitefriars			8 April 1986	TG2341309260; 52°38′06″N 1°18′01″E		1211208	Upload Photo	Q17530900
St James' Works	I	Jarrold's Printing Works, Whitefriars			26 February 1954	TG2347609246; 52°38′06″N 1°18′04″E		1051798	Upload Photo	Q7593501
11, 12 and 13, Lowes Yard	II*	11, 12 and 13, Lowes Yard, St Georges Street, NR3 1AW			26 February 1954	TG2303309030; 52°37′59″N 1°17′40″E		1051320	Upload Photo	Q17557104
Block to Rear of Number 24	II	Magdalen Street			8 April 1986	TG2314909159; 52°38′03″N 1°17′47″E		1051194	Upload Photo	Q26303111
Former Church of St Saviour	I	Magdalen Street			26 February 1954	TG2318609257; 52°38′06″N 1°17′49″E		1372838	Upload Photo	Q17537416
K6 Telephone Kiosk Outside St Saviour's Church	II	Magdalen Street			13 August 1990	TG2316809268; 52°38′07″N 1°17′48″E		1051769	Upload Photo	Q26303609
Rear of Number 29	II	Magdalen Street			8 April 1986	TG2320409175; 52°38′04″N 1°17′49″E		1051187	Upload Photo	Q26303105
1, Magdalen Street	II	1, Magdalen Street			5 June 1972	TG2319809078; 52°38′01″N 1°17′49″E		1372817	Upload Photo	Q26653873
3, Magdalen Street	II	3, Magdalen Street			5 June 1972	TG2319909085; 52°38′01″N 1°17′49″E		1051221	Upload Photo	Q26303137
5 and 7, Magdalen Street	II	5 and 7, Magdalen Street			5 June 1972	TG2319709101; 52°38′01″N 1°17′49″E		1051184	Upload Photo	Q26303102
16, Magdalen Street	II	16, Magdalen Street			5 June 1972	TG2317409126; 52°38′02″N 1°17′48″E		1291710	Upload Photo	Q26579798
18-22, Magdalen Street	II	18-22, Magdalen Street			5 June 1972	TG2317209137; 52°38′03″N 1°17′48″E		1372841	Upload Photo	Q26653893
19, Magdalen Street	II	19, Magdalen Street			8 April 1986	TG2319209138; 52°38′03″N 1°17′49″E		1051185	Upload Photo	Q26303103
21, Magdalen Street	II	21, Magdalen Street			5 June 1972	TG2319109144; 52°38′03″N 1°17′49″E		1051186	Upload Photo	Q26303104
24, Magdalen Street	II	24, Magdalen Street			5 June 1972	TG2316709154; 52°38′03″N 1°17′47″E		1218958	Upload Photo	Q26513539
28, Magdalen Street	II	28, Magdalen Street			8 April 1986	TG2316309176; 52°38′04″N 1°17′47″E		1291687	Upload Photo	Q26579778
29, Magdalen Street	II	29, Magdalen Street			5 June 1972	TG2318509171; 52°38′04″N 1°17′48″E		1372837	Upload Photo	Q26653890
Numbers 31 to 35 and Gurney Court	II*	31-35, Magdalen Street			26 February 1954	TG2317809190; 52°38′04″N 1°17′48″E		1051188	Upload Photo	Q17557011
32 and 32a, Magdalen Street	II	32 and 32a, Magdalen Street, NR3 1HU			5 June 1972	TG2315309184; 52°38′04″N 1°17′47″E		1051252	Upload Photo	Q26303163
34-38, Magdalen Street	II	34-38, Magdalen Street			26 February 1954	TG2315709196; 52°38′05″N 1°17′47″E		1051195	Upload Photo	Q26303112
41, Magdalen Street	II	41, Magdalen Street			5 June 1972	TG2317409215; 52°38′05″N 1°17′48″E		1051189	Upload Photo	Q26303106
King's Head Public House	II	42, Magdalen Street			5 June 1972	TG2315409221; 52°38′05″N 1°17′47″E		1372842	Upload Photo	Q26653894
44, Magdalen Street	II	44, Magdalen Street			26 February 1954	TG2315209229; 52°38′06″N 1°17′47″E		1051196	Upload Photo	Q26303115
46 and 48, Magdalen Street	II	46 and 48, Magdalen Street			26 February 1954	TG2315109241; 52°38′06″N 1°17′47″E		1291696	Upload Photo	Q26579786
47 and 49, Magdalen Street	II	47 and 49, Magdalen Street			5 June 1972	TG2317009275; 52°38′07″N 1°17′48″E		1051190	Upload Photo	Q26303107
75, Magdalen Street	II	75, Magdalen Street			5 June 1972	TG2316909365; 52°38′10″N 1°17′48″E		1372839	Upload Photo	Q26653891
Cat and Fiddle Public House	II	105, Magdalen Street			5 June 1972	TG2317209465; 52°38′13″N 1°17′48″E		1051191	Upload Photo	Q26303108
107 and 109, Magdalen Street	II	107 and 109, Magdalen Street			5 June 1972	TG2317509475; 52°38′14″N 1°17′49″E		1218903	Upload Photo	Q26513489
113, Magdalen Street	II	113, Magdalen Street			5 June 1972	TG2317209491; 52°38′14″N 1°17′49″E		1051192	Upload Photo	Q26303109
115 and 117, Magdalen Street	II	115 and 117, Magdalen Street			5 June 1972	TG2317209498; 52°38′14″N 1°17′49″E		1291722	Upload Photo	Q26579809
133, Magdalen Street	II	133, Magdalen Street			22 December 1987	TG2317409551; 52°38′16″N 1°17′49″E		1372541	Upload Photo	Q26653651
135, Magdalen Street	II	135, Magdalen Street			5 June 1972	TG2317409557; 52°38′16″N 1°17′49″E		1372840	Upload Photo	Q26653892
136, 138 and 140, Magdalen Street	II	136, 138 and 140, Magdalen Street			5 June 1972	TG2315909602; 52°38′18″N 1°17′48″E		1372843	Upload Photo	Q26653895
137, Magdalen Street	II	137, Magdalen Street			5 June 1972	TG2317409567; 52°38′17″N 1°17′49″E		1218948	Upload Photo	Q26513530
139, Magdalen Street	II	139, Magdalen Street			5 June 1972	TG2317409573; 52°38′17″N 1°17′49″E		1051193	Upload Photo	Q26303110
142, Magdalen Street	II	142, Magdalen Street			8 April 1986	TG2315209619; 52°38′18″N 1°17′48″E		1291663	Upload Photo	Q26579756
146 and 148, Magdalen Street	II	146 and 148, Magdalen Street			5 June 1972	TG2315409626; 52°38′18″N 1°17′48″E		1051197	Upload Photo	Q26303116
The Woolpack Public House	II	Muspole Street			5 June 1972	TG2295209033; 52°38′00″N 1°17′36″E		1219257	The Woolpack Public House More images	Q26513810
1-9, Muspole Street	II	1-9, Muspole Street			5 June 1972	TG2298009066; 52°38′01″N 1°17′37″E		1051946	Upload Photo	Q26303759
Pump House	II	New Mills Yard			5 June 1972	TG2261309043; 52°38′00″N 1°17′18″E		1051923	Upload Photo	Q26303739
Church of St Martin at Oak	I	Oak Street			26 February 1954	TG2273709200; 52°38′05″N 1°17′25″E		1051925	Upload Photo	Q17537314
Church of St Michael Coslany	I	Oak Street			26 February 1954	TG2282808996; 52°37′59″N 1°17′29″E		1372474	Upload Photo	Q17537388
The Great Hall	II	Oak Street			5 June 1972	TG2260309436; 52°38′13″N 1°17′18″E		1051928	Upload Photo	Q26303743
98 and 100, Oak Street	II	98 and 100, Oak Street			26 February 1954	TG2266509283; 52°38′08″N 1°17′21″E		1051926	Upload Photo	Q26303741
102 and 104, Oak Street	II	102 and 104, Oak Street			26 February 1954	TG2266409295; 52°38′08″N 1°17′21″E		1219542	Upload Photo	Q26514082
106, Oak Street	II	106, Oak Street			26 February 1954	TG2266209303; 52°38′09″N 1°17′21″E		1051927	Upload Photo	Q26303742
108, Oak Street	II	108, Oak Street			26 February 1954	TG2266009308; 52°38′09″N 1°17′21″E		1219549	Upload Photo	Q26514089
Flats 1-5	II*	Octagon Court			26 February 1954	TG2305509047; 52°38′00″N 1°17′41″E		1051929	Upload Photo	Q17557224
2, Old Meeting House Alley	II	2, Old Meeting House Alley			8 April 1986	TG2310609068; 52°38′01″N 1°17′44″E		1051930	Upload Photo	Q26303744
17a, Old Meeting House Alley	II	17a, Old Meeting House Alley			8 April 1986	TG2310109084; 52°38′01″N 1°17′44″E		1291395	Upload Photo	Q26579515
Vaulted Undercroft under Flats 7 and 9	II	Rosemary Lane			23 November 1993	TG2281409074; 52°38′01″N 1°17′29″E		1319719	Upload Photo	Q26605788
Pykerell's House	II*	1, Rosemary Lane			26 February 1954	TG2280509090; 52°38′02″N 1°17′28″E		1290996	Upload Photo	Q17531052
Church of St Augustine	I	St Augustine's Street			26 February 1954	TG2288109474; 52°38′14″N 1°17′33″E		1051896	Upload Photo	Q7592536
Rear of Numbers 13 and 15	II	St Augustine's Street			8 April 1986	TG2291109505; 52°38′15″N 1°17′35″E		1051894	Upload Photo	Q26303714
1 and 3, St Augustine's Street	II	1 and 3, St Augustine's Street			21 August 1978	TG2293009471; 52°38′14″N 1°17′36″E		1220508	Upload Photo	Q26514977
5, St Augustine's Street	II	5, St Augustine's Street			5 June 1972	TG2292809478; 52°38′14″N 1°17′36″E		1051893	Upload Photo	Q26303713
7, St Augustine's Street	II	7, St Augustine's Street			5 June 1972	TG2291909486; 52°38′14″N 1°17′35″E		1220515	Upload Photo	Q26514983
9 and 11, St Augustine's Street	II	9 and 11, St Augustine's Street			5 June 1972	TG2291409493; 52°38′15″N 1°17′35″E		1372494	Upload Photo	Q26653609
21, St Augustine's Street	II	21, St Augustine's Street			8 April 1986	TG2289409518; 52°38′15″N 1°17′34″E		1220534	Upload Photo	Q26515002
22 and 24, St Augustine's Street	II	22 and 24, St Augustine's Street			5 June 1972	TG2287809509; 52°38′15″N 1°17′33″E		1220581	Upload Photo	Q26515048
23 and 25, St Augustine's Street	II	23 and 25, St Augustine's Street			5 June 1972	TG2289009525; 52°38′16″N 1°17′34″E		1372495	Upload Photo	Q26653610
26-30, St Augustine's Street	II	26-30, St Augustine's Street			6 February 1981	TG2287109518; 52°38′15″N 1°17′33″E		1372458	Upload Photo	Q26653579
27-29, St Augustine's Street	II	27-29, St Augustine's Street			8 April 1986	TG2288109534; 52°38′16″N 1°17′33″E		1220544	Upload Photo	Q26515012
55, St Augustine's Street	II	55, St Augustine's Street			8 April 1986	TG2283709596; 52°38′18″N 1°17′31″E		1051895	Upload Photo	Q26303715
The Catherine Wheel Public House	II	61, St Augustine's Street			8 April 1986	TG2282109599; 52°38′18″N 1°17′30″E		1290924	Upload Photo	Q26579089
Bollard at North End Adjoining Colegate	II	St Clement's Alley			5 June 1972	TG2315209051; 52°38′00″N 1°17′46″E		1220848	Upload Photo	Q26515291
Station Bridge	II	St Crispins Road			5 June 1972	TG2259809249; 52°38′07″N 1°17′17″E		1051868	Upload Photo	Q26303693
Gentlemens Urinal	II	St Crispins Road			10 March 1998	TG2261509243; 52°38′07″N 1°17′18″E		1119668	Upload Photo	Q26412975
25-29, St George's Street	II	25-29, St George's Street			5 June 1972	TG2303808994; 52°37′58″N 1°17′40″E		1051869	Upload Photo	Q26303694
63, St George's Street	II	63, St George's Street			4 July 1978	TG2298209202; 52°38′05″N 1°17′38″E		1290734	Upload Photo	Q26578916
80 and 82, St George's Street	II	80 and 82, St George's Street			5 June 1972	TG2299609077; 52°38′01″N 1°17′38″E		1051870	Upload Photo	Q26303695
Remains of Anchorite House	II	St James' Works, Whitefriars			5 June 1972	TG2343509201; 52°38′04″N 1°18′02″E		1211214	Upload Photo	Q26506235
Folly House and Pineapple House	II	47, St Martin's Lane			5 June 1972	TG2277209229; 52°38′06″N 1°17′27″E		1210466	Upload Photo	Q26505514
Church of St Mary	I	St Mary's Plain			26 February 1954	TG2282509131; 52°38′03″N 1°17′29″E		1372513	Upload Photo	Q17537392
1, Sussex Street	II	1, Sussex Street			5 June 1972	TG2283309560; 52°38′17″N 1°17′31″E		1051897	Upload Photo	Q26303716
1a-11, Sussex Street	II	1a-11, Sussex Street			5 June 1972	TG2281909548; 52°38′16″N 1°17′30″E		1290408	Upload Photo	Q26578614
2, Sussex Street	II	2, Sussex Street			6 February 1981	TG2285809532; 52°38′16″N 1°17′32″E		1290907	Upload Photo	Q26579074
4-10, Sussex Street	II	4-10, Sussex Street			5 June 1972	TG2284009529; 52°38′16″N 1°17′31″E		1290379	Upload Photo	Q26578587
12-16, Sussex Street	II	12-16, Sussex Street			5 June 1972	TG2282609523; 52°38′16″N 1°17′30″E		1051833	Upload Photo	Q26303666
13-19, Sussex Street	II	13-19, Sussex Street			5 June 1972	TG2279709539; 52°38′16″N 1°17′29″E		1372500	Upload Photo	Q26653615
18 and 20, Sussex Street	II	18 and 20, Sussex Street			5 June 1972	TG2281009516; 52°38′15″N 1°17′29″E		1210608	Upload Photo	Q26505656
21, Sussex Street	II	21, Sussex Street			5 June 1972	TG2278209533; 52°38′16″N 1°17′28″E		1290411	Upload Photo	Q26578618
22, Sussex Street	II	22, Sussex Street			5 June 1972	TG2280009513; 52°38′15″N 1°17′29″E		1372501	Upload Photo	Q26653616
24, Sussex Street	II	24, Sussex Street			5 June 1972	TG2279109509; 52°38′15″N 1°17′28″E		1210613	Upload Photo	Q26505660
26-40, Sussex Street	II	26-40, Sussex Street			5 June 1972	TG2277509503; 52°38′15″N 1°17′27″E		1051834	Upload Photo	Q26303667
27 and 29, Sussex Street	II	27 and 29, Sussex Street			5 June 1972	TG2275709524; 52°38′16″N 1°17′27″E		1051832	Upload Photo	Q26303665
Former Church of St James	I	Whitefriars			26 May 1954	TG2341509358; 52°38′09″N 1°18′01″E		1372521	Upload Photo	Q7061525

== See also ==
- Grade I listed buildings in Norfolk
- Grade II* listed buildings in Norfolk

== Sources ==
- Wilson, Bill; Pevsner, Nikolaus (1997) [1962], Norfolk 1: Norwich and North-East, The Buildings of England, New Haven and London: Yale University Press, ISBN 978-0-300-09607-1
