= Doughty's Hospital =

Hospital and almshouse in Norwich, England

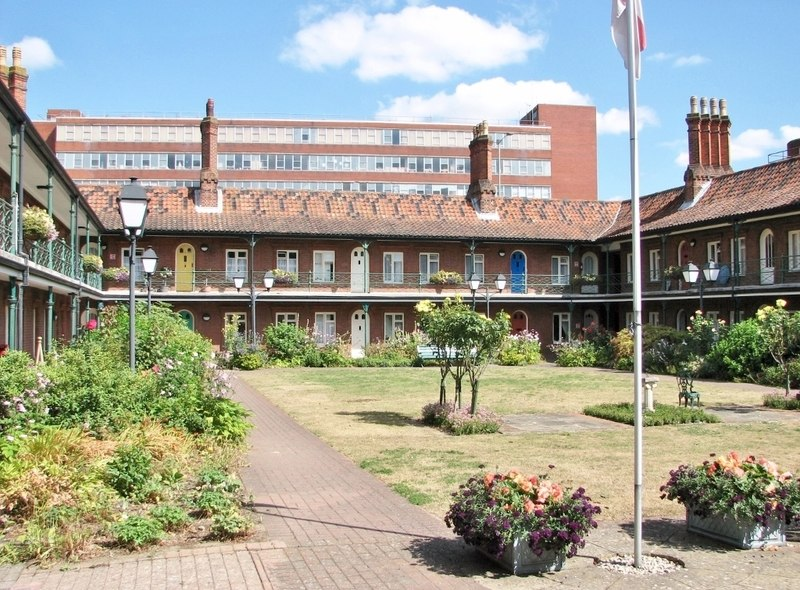

Geography
- Location: Golden Dog Lane, Norwich, England
- Coordinates: 52.63518°N 1.29542°E

Services
- Emergency department: No

History
- Founded: 1687

Links
- Lists: Hospitals in England

Doughty's Hospital is a hospital and almshouse for the elderly in the city of Norwich, England. Located on Golden Dog Lane, it was established by a bequest of £6,000 from William Doughty in 1687, and held patients over 60 years of age until 1856 when this was increased to 65. It initially housed 32 patients.

== History ==
In 1687, William Doughty, in his will which described it both as a hospital and an almshouse, bequested £6,000 for a hospital intended for 32 people over 60 years of age. Doughty had no children, and his other relatives appeared to have dealt deviously with him in the past, so he was motivated to give his wealth to charitable deeds. Also in his will, Doughty made a specific provision for the Norwich corporation to assume responsibility for the hospital after a designated number of years. His contribution is reflected on a commemorative stone at the building.

During the 18th century, residents donned purple outfits, and the hospital had rules against "cursing, swearing, and drunkenness." The transition of the hospital into Norwich corporation ownership caused significant controversy. In the 1830s, the city's aldermen were caught up in a controversy in which they were accused of buying votes through the promise of places in the almshouse. This led to a new body of trustees being established, which was partially independent of the Norwich corporation. Doughty's rule that nobody 60 years old or younger should be admitted to the hospital was followed faithfully until 1856, when trustees agreed that the minimum age limit for nomination should be raised so that no patient under 65 would be admitted. The hospital was rebuilt atop the sparse remains of its 17th century ground floor in 1869, and through this was extended, meaning it could house 13 more patients.

The building received a restoration in 1995. In 2010, A History of Doughty's Hospital, Norwich, 1687-2009, was published, detailing its 320-year history.

== Architecture ==
The building is outwardly of Victorian style. It consists of three connected ranges of two stories around a courtyard, with four flats on each floor on each side. Each flat features round-headed doors and 2-light casements with rusticated brick surrounds. The building has red brick and pantile roofs with a continuous-pitch roof over the cast iron first floor balcony. The roofs feature 19th century chimneys in a Tudor-like style, and crow-stepped end gables There are 13 first-floor windows on each of the flanking sides, and eight on the end range. The inner balusters and newel posts from the building's 17th century staircase were re-used in the north-west corner of the building.
