= Heinz Isler =

Swiss civil engineer (1926–2009)

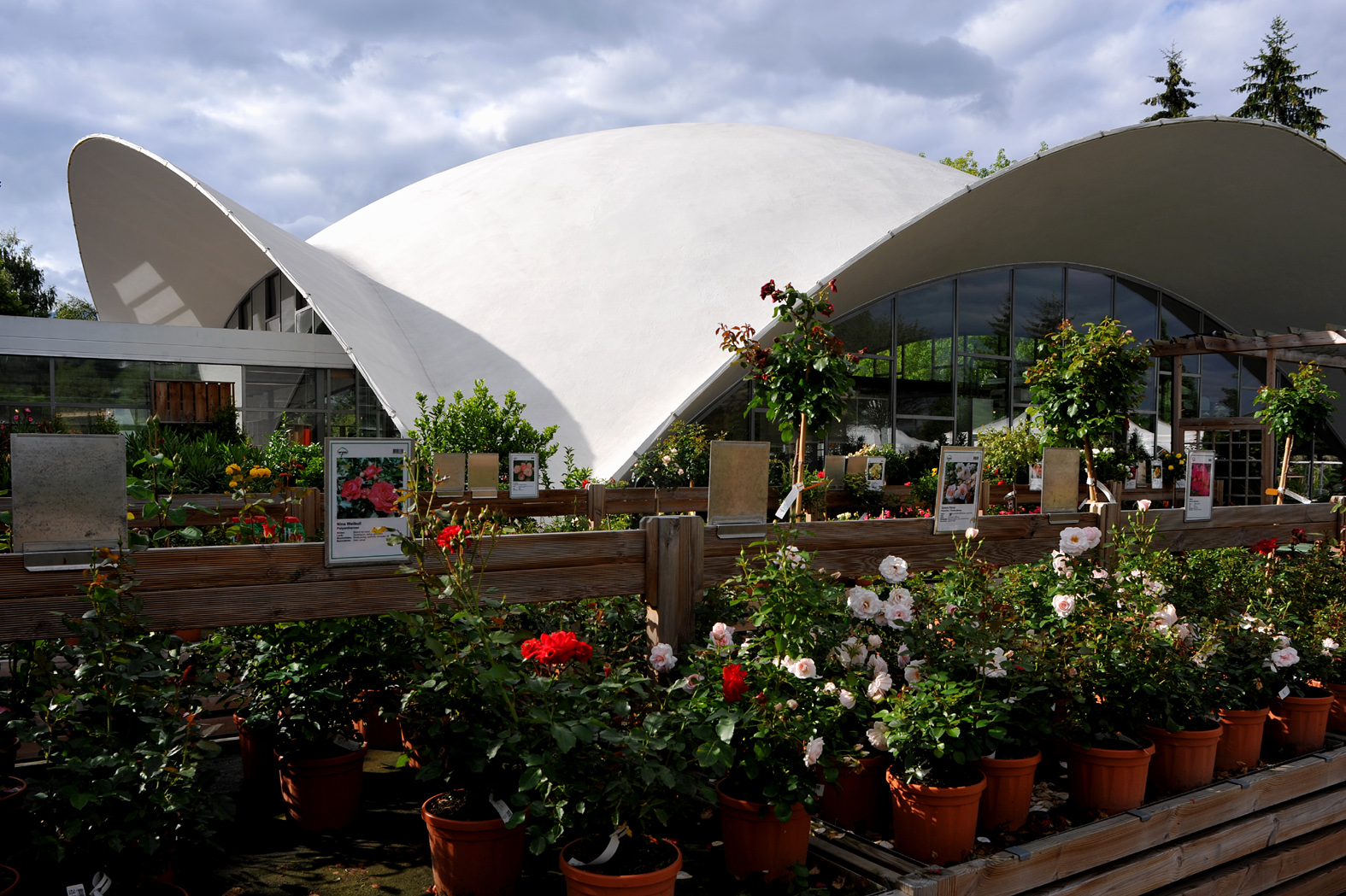
Concrete shell roof of the garden center Wyss in Zuchwil, (1962)

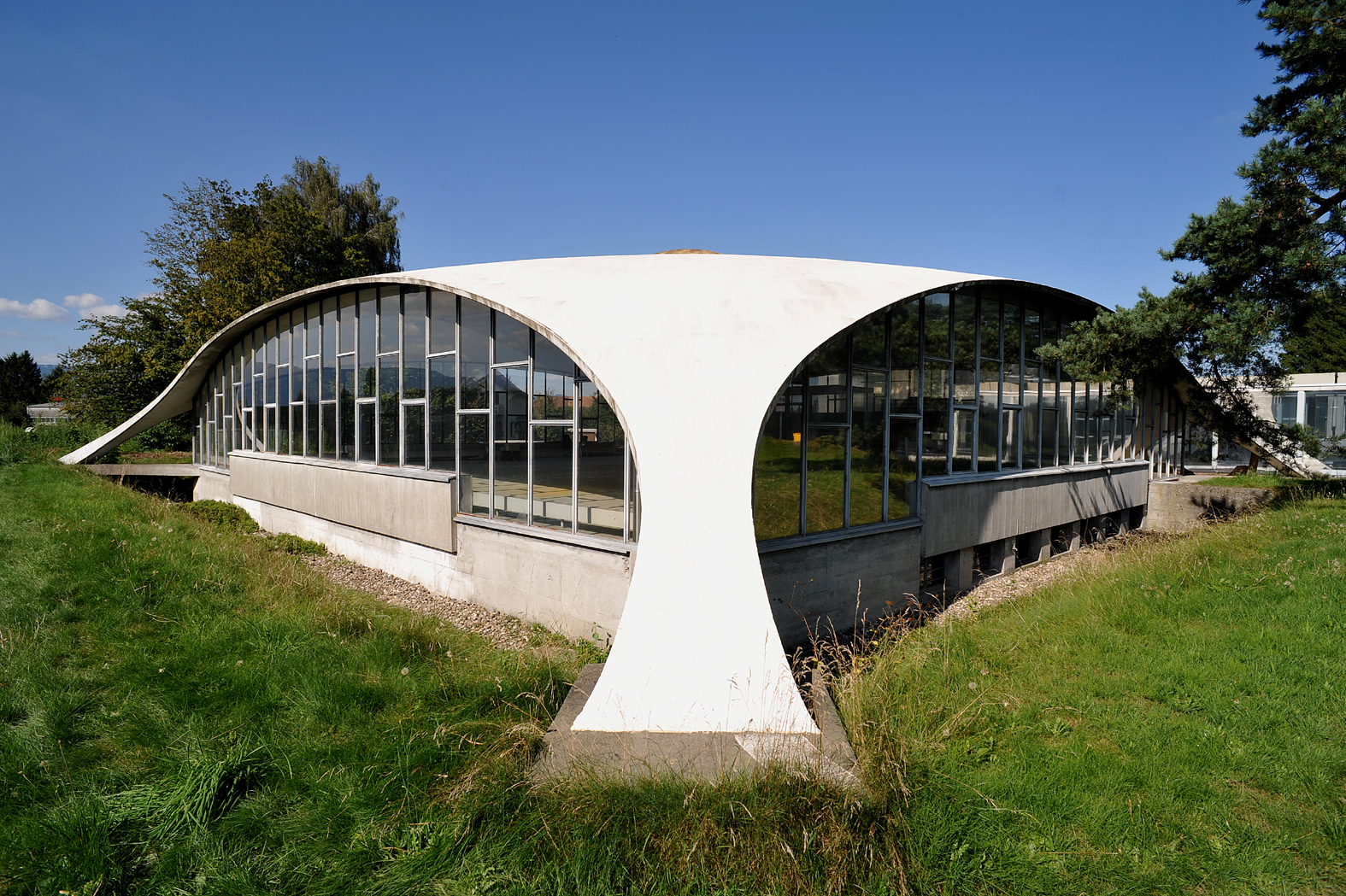
Concrete dome roof of a building of the former company Kilcher in Recherswil, (1965)

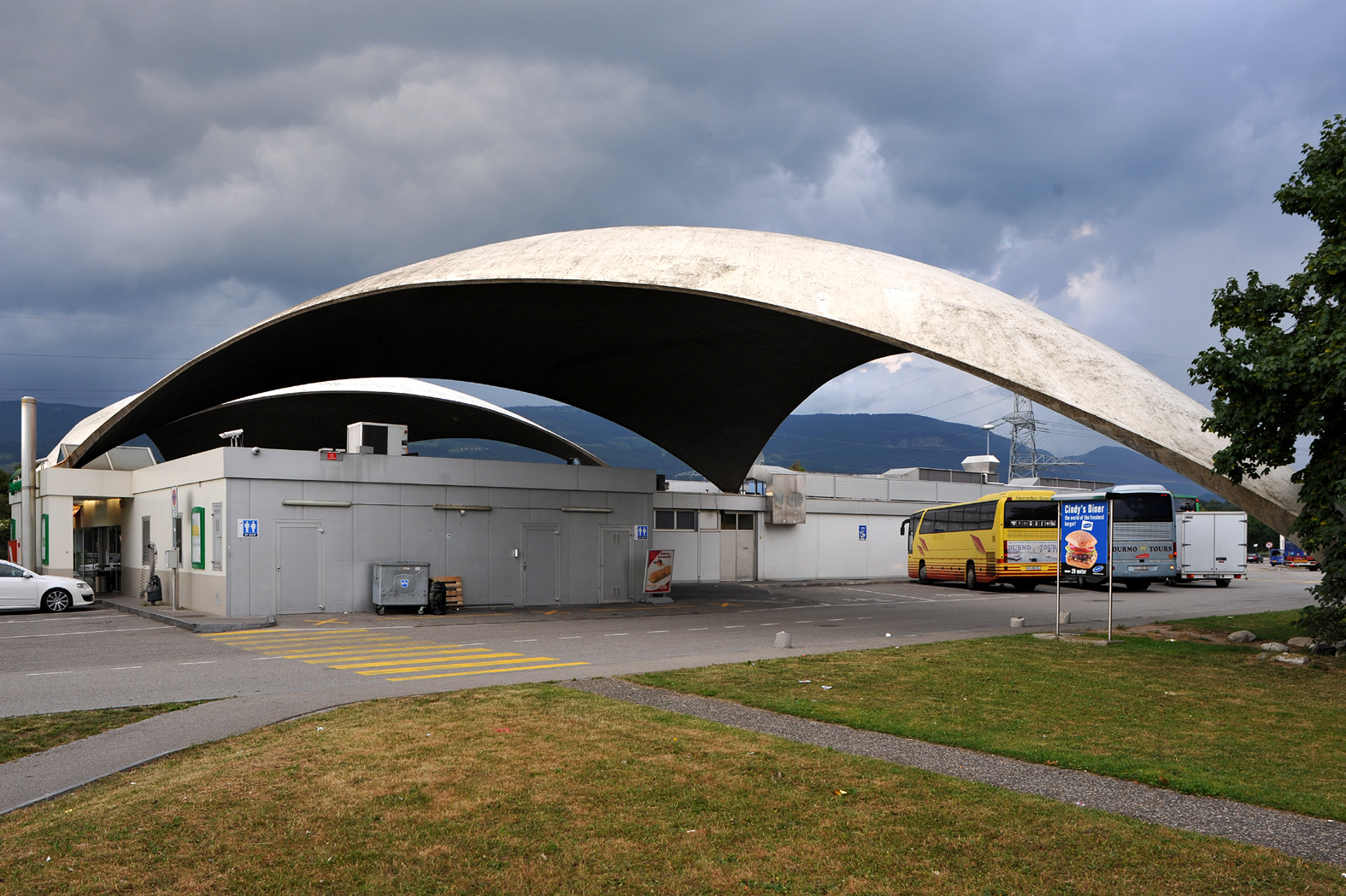
Highway service area Deitingen south, triangle concrete cupola roofs, (1968)

Heinz Isler (July 26, 1926 – June 20, 2009) was a Swiss structural engineer. He is famous for his thin concrete shells.

== Early life and education ==
Heinz Isler was born in the municipality of Zollikon. He showed talent as an artist as a student, but his father advised him to seek a career in engineering first. Isler studied thin concrete shells at the Federal Institute of Technology (ETH) in Zurich.

== Career ==
Upon graduating from the ETH in 1950 with a degree in civil engineering, Isler worked as a teaching assistant with Pierre Lardy, a professor at the ETH, from 1951 to 1953. He opened his own office in 1954 in Burgdorf, Switzerland. His first project as a shellbuilder was a concert hall roof for the Hotel Kreuz in Langenthal which was completed between 1954 and 1955. The form of the shell was loosely inspired by the shape of a plumped-up pillow on his bed.

== Death ==
Isler died from a stroke on June 20, 2009 at the age of 82.

== Bibliography ==
- Isler, Heinz (1980). "Structural Beauty of Shells". IABSE Congress Report. 11. ETH Zurich: 147–152. doi:10.5169/seals-11239.
- Isler, Heinz (1981). "Effective Use of Concrete". IABSE Reports of the Working Commissions. 36. ETH Zurich: 189–191. doi:10.5169/seals-28279.

== See also ==
- Christian Menn
- Othmar H. Ammann
- Robert Maillart
