= Listed buildings in Norwich (outside the city walls) =

Norwich is city and non-civil parish in Norfolk , England. It contains 62 grade I, 126 grade II* and 855 grade II listed buildings that are recorded in the National Heritage List for England.

This list is based on the information retrieved online from Historic England

The quantity of listed buildings in Norwich requires subdivision into geographically defined lists. This list includes all listed buildings located outside the city walls.

== Key ==
Grade	Criteria
I	Buildings that are of exceptional interest
II*	Particularly important buildings of more than special interest
II	Buildings that are of special interest

== Listing ==
Name	Grade	Location	Type	Completed (Note: The date given is the date used by Historic England as significant for the initial building or that of an important part in the structure's description.)	Date designated	Grid ref. (Note: The grid reference is based on the British national grid reference system, sometimes known as OSGB36, used by the Ordnance Survey.) Geo-coordinates	Notes	Entry number (Note: The "List Entry Number" is a unique number assigned to each listed building and scheduled monument by Historic England.)	Image	Wikidata
18, Albemarle Road	II	18, Albemarle Road			5 June 1972	TG2196507494; 52°37′11″N 1°16′40″E		1372726	Upload Photo	Q26653806
Waterloo Park	II	Angel Park, Waterloo Park			13 January 1995	TG2275310310; 52°38′41″N 1°17′28″E		1068857	Upload Photo	Q26321552
Waterloo Park	II	Angel Road, Waterloo Park			13 January 1995	TG2260810282; 52°38′40″N 1°17′21″E		1068858	Upload Photo	Q26321553
Waterloo Park	II	Angel Road, Waterloo Park			13 January 1995	TG2260810312; 52°38′41″N 1°17′21″E		1068859	Upload Photo	Q26321554
Waterloo Park	II	Angel Road, Waterloo Park			13 January 1995	TG2255610313; 52°38′42″N 1°17′18″E		1116909	Upload Photo	Q26410486
Wensum Park	II	Angel Road, Wensum Park			13 January 1995	TG2252409850; 52°38′27″N 1°17′15″E		1068860	Upload Photo	Q26321555
Church Hall Adjacent to Church of St Catherine	II	Aylesham Road			21 August 2006	TG2194810884; 52°39′01″N 1°16′47″E		1391747	Upload Photo	Q26671099
Church of St Catherine	II*	Aylesham Road			21 August 2006	TG2195110923; 52°39′02″N 1°16′47″E		1391746	Upload Photo	Q17531435
Bowthorpe Hall	II	Bowthorpe			2 October 1951	TG1779609049; 52°38′08″N 1°13′02″E		1051373	Upload Photo	Q26303252
Ruins of Church of St Michael	II	Bowthorpe			26 November 1959	TG1773609090; 52°38′09″N 1°12′59″E		1205656	Upload Photo	Q17647917
Jewish Mortuary Chapel at Earlham Cemetery	II	Bowthorpe Road			15 March 2016	TG2097308959; 52°38′00″N 1°15′50″E		1412670	Upload Photo	Q26676279
Approximately 33m West of Carrow Abbey	II	Bracondale, NR1 2EE			21 December 2021	TG2415207431; 52°37′06″N 1°18′36″E		1478318	Upload Photo	Q111853513
Approximately 40m West of Carrow Abbey	II	Bracondale, NR1 2EE			21 December 2021	TG2416807367; 52°37′04″N 1°18′36″E		1478166	Upload Photo	Q111853495
Carrow Works	I	Bracondale, NR1 2DD			26 May 1954	TG2421707399; 52°37′05″N 1°18′39″E		1205742	Upload Photo	Q5046726
Lodge, gardener's cottage and former cart shed to Carrow Abbey	II	Bracondale, NR1 2EE			21 December 2021	TG2417607345; 52°37′03″N 1°18′37″E		1478591	Upload Photo	Q111853540
Numbers 33 and 35 and Attached Garden Wall to East of Number 35	II	Bracondale			5 June 1972	TG2380407486; 52°37′08″N 1°18′17″E		1205728	Upload Photo	Q26501031
South East and South West Boundary to Wall to Number 54	II	Bracondale			5 June 1972	TG2375807430; 52°37′07″N 1°18′15″E		1280578	Upload Photo	Q26569699
Tower and Adjoining Retaining Wall to Rear of Number 58	II*	Bracondale			26 February 1954	TG2378407395; 52°37′05″N 1°18′16″E		1280541	Upload Photo	Q17531017
Trowse Pumping Station	II	Bracondale, NR1 2EG			22 December 2021	TG2441607038; 52°36′53″N 1°18′49″E		1478662	Upload Photo	Q111853542
Trowse Pumping Station	II	Bracondale, NR1 2EG			22 December 2021	TG2444207061; 52°36′54″N 1°18′50″E		1478264	Upload Photo	Q111853506
Trowse Railway Station	II	Bracondale, NR1 2EE			21 December 2021	TG2434907115; 52°36′56″N 1°18′45″E		1478346	Upload Photo	Q7846695
3 and 5, Bracondale	II	3 and 5, Bracondale			5 June 1972	TG2357207708; 52°37′16″N 1°18′05″E		1205665	Upload Photo	Q26500977
7, Bracondale	II	7, Bracondale			5 June 1972	TG2358007703; 52°37′16″N 1°18′06″E		1051374	Upload Photo	Q26303253
17 and 19, Bracondale	II	17 and 19, Bracondale			5 June 1972	TG2372807548; 52°37′10″N 1°18′13″E		1051375	Upload Photo	Q26303254
25 and 27, Bracondale	II	25 and 27, Bracondale			8 April 1986	TG2376907524; 52°37′10″N 1°18′15″E		1205691	Upload Photo	Q26501000
29 and 29a, Bracondale	II	29 and 29a, Bracondale			8 April 1986	TG2377507505; 52°37′09″N 1°18′16″E		1051376	Upload Photo	Q26303255
31, Bracondale	II	31, Bracondale			5 June 1972	TG2379007493; 52°37′09″N 1°18′17″E		1051377	Upload Photo	Q26303256
37-43, Bracondale	II	37-43, Bracondale			5 June 1972	TG2381807470; 52°37′08″N 1°18′18″E		1372742	Upload Photo	Q26653818
40-46, Bracondale	II	40-46, Bracondale			5 June 1972	TG2371207481; 52°37′08″N 1°18′12″E		1372743	Upload Photo	Q26653819
45 and 47, Bracondale	II	45 and 47, Bracondale			5 June 1972	TG2382507454; 52°37′07″N 1°18′18″E		1205738	Upload Photo	Q26501037
48-52, Bracondale	II	48-52, Bracondale			5 June 1972	TG2373307460; 52°37′08″N 1°18′13″E		1205750	Upload Photo	Q26501046
51-57, Bracondale	II	51-57, Bracondale			5 June 1972	TG2385407435; 52°37′07″N 1°18′20″E		1051378	Upload Photo	Q26303257
Manor House	II*	54, Bracondale			26 February 1954	TG2375207444; 52°37′07″N 1°18′14″E		1051379	Upload Photo	Q17557156
Tower House	II	58, Bracondale			26 February 1954	TG2380007402; 52°37′06″N 1°18′17″E		1051380	Upload Photo	Q26303258
60, Bracondale	II	60, Bracondale			5 June 1972	TG2395807346; 52°37′04″N 1°18′25″E		1372744	Upload Photo	Q26653820
62 and 64, Bracondale	II	62 and 64, Bracondale			26 February 1954	TG2398107338; 52°37′03″N 1°18′26″E		1051381	Upload Photo	Q26303259
66, Bracondale	II	66, Bracondale			5 June 1972	TG2399807332; 52°37′03″N 1°18′27″E		1372764	Upload Photo	Q26653834
66a, Bracondale	II	66a, Bracondale			8 April 1986	TG2399207334; 52°37′03″N 1°18′27″E		1051342	Upload Photo	Q26303226
Forecourt Wall, Gates and Railings to Numbers 66 and 66a	II	66 and 66a, Bracondale			8 April 1986	TG2400307337; 52°37′03″N 1°18′27″E		1051343	Upload Photo	Q26303227
68, Bracondale	II	68, Bracondale			5 June 1972	TG2401107324; 52°37′03″N 1°18′28″E		1372765	Upload Photo	Q26653835
Forecourt Wall, Gate and Railings to Number 68	II	68, Bracondale			8 April 1986	TG2401307332; 52°37′03″N 1°18′28″E		1051344	Upload Photo	Q26303228
70, Bracondale	II	70, Bracondale			5 June 1972	TG2402007321; 52°37′03″N 1°18′28″E		1051345	Upload Photo	Q26303229
72, 72a and 72b, Bracondale	II	72, 72a and 72b, Bracondale			26 February 1954	TG2403607312; 52°37′02″N 1°18′29″E		1372766	Upload Photo	Q26653836
Bracondale Cottage	II	80, Bracondale			5 June 1972	TG2405607232; 52°37′00″N 1°18′30″E		1051346	Upload Photo	Q26303230
Britannia Barracks (h.q. Royal Anglian Regiment and Regimental Museum)	II	Britannia Road			5 June 1972	TG2431709553; 52°38′14″N 1°18′50″E		1280455	Upload Photo	Q26569590
H M Prison	II	Britannia Road			5 June 1972	TG2437109434; 52°38′10″N 1°18′52″E		1372769	Upload Photo	Q5635239
Peppers	II	7, Carrow Hill			4 May 1971	TG2382707546; 52°37′10″N 1°18′19″E		1051351	Upload Photo	Q26303235
Former Mustard Seed Drying Shed	II	Carrow Works, NR1 1JB			21 December 2021	TG2439007504; 52°37′08″N 1°18′48″E		1478122	Upload Photo	Q111853494
K6 Telephone Kiosk outside the entrance of the former mustard seed drying shed	II	Carrow Works, NR1 1JB			21 December 2021	TG2437607512; 52°37′08″N 1°18′48″E		1478657	Upload Photo	Q111853541
Carrow Works blocks 7, 7A, 8A and 8 including metal canopy attached to block 7	II	Carrow Works, NR1 2DD			8 April 1986	TG2412907610; 52°37′12″N 1°18′35″E		1372826	Upload Photo	Q26653878
Eastern air raid shelter at Carrow Works	II	Carrow Works, NR1 2DD			21 December 2021	TG2408307464; 52°37′07″N 1°18′32″E		1478214	Upload Photo	Q111853498
Chapel in the Field Methodist Church	II	Chapelfield Road			8 April 1986	TG2269608074; 52°37′29″N 1°17′20″E		1280364	Upload Photo	Q26569508
Chester House	II	Chester Place			5 June 1972	TG2216208628; 52°37′48″N 1°16′53″E		1051323	Upload Photo	Q26303216
Chester Lodge	II	Chester Place			5 June 1972	TG2216008610; 52°37′47″N 1°16′53″E		1372756	Upload Photo	Q26653831
1-7, Chester Place	II	1-7, Chester Place			5 June 1972	TG2214108504; 52°37′44″N 1°16′51″E		1372757	Upload Photo	Q26653832
Christ Church	II	Church Avenue			5 June 1972	TG2161507327; 52°37′06″N 1°16′21″E		1051326	Upload Photo	Q26303220
Church Farm (house)	II	Church Lane, Eaton			5 June 1972	TG2038805997; 52°36′25″N 1°15′12″E		1051327	Upload Photo	Q26303221
Church of St Andrew	II*	Church Lane, Eaton			26 February 1954	TG2025405966; 52°36′24″N 1°15′05″E		1206191	Upload Photo	Q17557259
Numbers 31 to 33 and Attached Boundary Wall	II	Church Lane, Eaton			4 July 1986	TG2027106046; 52°36′27″N 1°15′06″E		1051763	Upload Photo	Q26303603
The Old House	II	Church Lane, Eaton			26 May 1954	TG2035005945; 52°36′24″N 1°15′10″E		1372758	Upload Photo	Q26653833
Church of St Mark	II	City Road			5 June 1972	TG2342207450; 52°37′08″N 1°17′57″E		1280305	Upload Photo	Q26569455
1-14, City Road	II	1-14, City Road			5 June 1972	TG2350707262; 52°37′02″N 1°18′01″E		1051232	Upload Photo	Q26303148
Paradise Row	II	15-26, City Road			5 June 1972	TG2354807249; 52°37′01″N 1°18′03″E		1292264	Upload Photo	Q26580294
Rose Cottages	II	27-32, City Road			5 June 1972	TG2349507244; 52°37′01″N 1°18′00″E		1372822	Upload Photo	Q26653876
Chaumiere De L'Etoile	II	82 and 84, Constitution Hill			8 April 1986	TG2328810601; 52°38′50″N 1°17′57″E		1372775	Upload Photo	Q26653844
2 and 4, Cotman Road	II	2 and 4, Cotman Road			8 April 1986	TG2452008239; 52°37′32″N 1°18′57″E		1051287	Upload Photo	Q26303194
63-79, Cozens Road	II	63-79, Cozens Road, NR1 1JP			1 April 1982	TG2442707934; 52°37′22″N 1°18′51″E		1206541	Upload Photo	Q26501745
The Gatehouse public house	II	Dereham Road, NR5 8QJ			24 August 2015	TG2049609417; 52°38′16″N 1°15′26″E		1427216	Upload Photo	Q21008659
Church Farm	II	Earlham			26 February 1954	TG1905208314; 52°37′42″N 1°14′07″E		1206583	Upload Photo	Q26501787
Church of St Mary	I	Earlham			26 February 1954	TG1904408292; 52°37′41″N 1°14′06″E		1372778	Upload Photo	Q17537408
Dovecote at Earlham Hall (tg 191 082)	II	Earlham			5 June 1972	TG1905408215; 52°37′39″N 1°14′07″E		1051297	Upload Photo	Q26303203
Earlham Hall and Attached Outbuildings	II*	Earlham			26 February 1954	TG1915308001; 52°37′32″N 1°14′12″E		1051296	Upload Photo	Q5326501
Garden Walls Adjoining the South East Corner of Earlham Hall	II	Earlham			8 April 1986	TG1919207986; 52°37′31″N 1°14′14″E		1280159	Upload Photo	Q26569326
Cathedral of St John the Baptist	I	Earlham Road, NR2 3RA			26 February 1954	TG2232808547; 52°37′45″N 1°17′01″E		1051299	Upload Photo	Q1736143
Ice House about 18 Metres West North West of Number 21	II	Earlham Road			22 January 1991	TG2220408680; 52°37′49″N 1°16′55″E		1116652	Upload Photo	Q26410245
Library and Attached Stairs to Grounds at the University of East Anglia	II	Earlham Road			16 October 2003	TG1945307492; 52°37′15″N 1°14′26″E		1390649	Upload Photo	Q26670032
Norfolk Terrace and Attached Walkways at The University Of East Anglia	II*	Earlham Road			16 October 2003	TG1923407406; 52°37′12″N 1°14′14″E		1390647	Upload Photo	Q17531409
Roman Catholic Chapel at Earlham Cemetery	II	Earlham Road			15 March 2016	TG2120708741; 52°37′53″N 1°16′02″E		1412667	Upload Photo	Q26676278
Suffolk Terrace and Adjoining Walkway and Stairs to Rear at The University Of East Anglia	II*	Earlham Road			16 October 2003	TG1943007413; 52°37′12″N 1°14′25″E		1390646	Upload Photo	Q99616132
University of East Anglia	II*	Earlham Road, NR4 7TJ			19 December 2012	TG1906307438; 52°37′14″N 1°14′05″E		1409810	Upload Photo	Q7400532
The Crofters Hotel	II	2 and 2a, Earlham Road			5 June 1972	TG2227808603; 52°37′47″N 1°16′59″E		1206618	Upload Photo	Q26501820
4, Earlham Road	II	4, Earlham Road			5 June 1972	TG2219808587; 52°37′46″N 1°16′55″E		1372781	Upload Photo	Q26653849
Bircham House	II	9, Earlham Road			5 June 1972	TG2229608640; 52°37′48″N 1°17′00″E		1280162	Upload Photo	Q26569329
25-31, Earlham Road	II	25-31, Earlham Road			5 March 1982	TG2210608716; 52°37′51″N 1°16′50″E		1051298	Upload Photo	Q26303204
Grove Place	II	33-39, Earlham Road			5 March 1982	TG2207908723; 52°37′51″N 1°16′49″E		1280164	Upload Photo	Q26569331
38, Earlham Road	II	38, Earlham Road			5 June 1972	TG2197108696; 52°37′50″N 1°16′43″E		1206622	Upload Photo	Q26501823
Hoffers Restaurant	II	41, Earlham Road			5 June 1972	TG2205708735; 52°37′51″N 1°16′48″E		1372780	Upload Photo	Q26653848
50, Earlham Road	II	50, Earlham Road			5 June 1972	TG2196308696; 52°37′50″N 1°16′42″E		1051300	Upload Photo	Q26303207
Curfew Lodge	II	129, Earlham Road			5 June 1972	TG2157108631; 52°37′49″N 1°16′21″E		1206604	Upload Photo	Q26501807
Tomb of Frances and John Abel	II	Section 2, Plot 28, Earlham Cemetery, Earlham Road, NR2 3RG			11 September 2025	TQ7448307184; 52°37′53″N 1°16′04″E			Upload Photo	
1 and 3, Eaton Street	II	1 and 3, Eaton Street, Eaton			5 June 1972	TG2029006226; 52°36′33″N 1°15′08″E		1206627	Upload Photo	Q26501828
The Cellar House Public House	II	2, Eaton Street, Eaton			5 June 1972	TG2032906212; 52°36′32″N 1°15′10″E		1372801	Upload Photo	Q26653861
7, Eaton Street	II	7, Eaton Street, Eaton			5 June 1972	TG2027906216; 52°36′33″N 1°15′07″E		1051261	Upload Photo	Q26303172
15 and 17, Eaton Street	II	15 and 17, Eaton Street, Eaton			5 June 1972	TG2025706210; 52°36′32″N 1°15′06″E		1372800	Upload Photo	Q26653860
Midland Bank	II	16, Eaton Street, Eaton			5 June 1972	TG2026606161; 52°36′31″N 1°15′06″E		1051263	Upload Photo	Q26303174
St Margaret's	II	25, Eaton Street, Eaton			26 February 1954	TG2019306161; 52°36′31″N 1°15′02″E		1051262	Upload Photo	Q26303173
Ann's Pantry	II	30 and 32, Eaton Street, Eaton			8 April 1986	TG2021906140; 52°36′30″N 1°15′04″E		1051264	Upload Photo	Q26303175
Red Lion Public House	II*	52, Eaton Street, Eaton			26 February 1954	TG2018906119; 52°36′30″N 1°15′02″E		1372802	Upload Photo	Q17531341
North Boundary Wall of Number 6	II	Eden Close			20 February 1974	TG2521608510; 52°37′39″N 1°19′35″E		1051265	Upload Photo	Q26303176
72, Eleanor Road	II	72, Eleanor Road			5 June 1972	TG2300907346; 52°37′05″N 1°17′35″E		1372803	Upload Photo	Q26653862
2 and 2a, Fairfield Road	II	2 and 2a, Fairfield Road			5 June 1972	TG2213107214; 52°37′02″N 1°16′48″E		1025110	Upload Photo	Q26275917
Forecourt Wall, Gate And Gate Piers To Chester House And Magnolia House,	II	Chester Place			8 April 1986	TG2218808626; 52°37′48″N 1°16′54″E		1051324	Upload Photo	Q26303217
Forecourt Wall, Gate And Gate Piers To Chester Lodge	II	Chester Place			8 April 1986	TG2218008607; 52°37′47″N 1°16′54″E		1051325	Upload Photo	Q26303219
Lime Kiln at Mousehold Court	II	Gilman Road			10 August 1971	TG2360710439; 52°38′44″N 1°18′14″E		1024994	Upload Photo	Q26275838
2 and 4, Hardy Road	II	2 and 4, Hardy Road, NR1 1JN			1 April 1982	TG2440407945; 52°37′22″N 1°18′50″E		1372795	Upload Photo	Q26653856
6 and 8, Hardy Road	II	6 and 8, Hardy Road, NR1 1JN			1 April 1982	TG2440307960; 52°37′23″N 1°18′50″E		1209760	Upload Photo	Q26504810
Ebeneezer	II	10, Hardy Road			1 April 1982	TG2440007995; 52°37′24″N 1°18′50″E		1051254	Upload Photo	Q26303165
Serpentine Wall on the West Side of Eden Close	II	Harvey Lane			30 November 1973	TG2518408477; 52°37′38″N 1°19′33″E		1292471	Upload Photo	Q26580483
Church of St John and All Saints	II*	Harwood Road, Lakenham			26 February 1954	TG2335406088; 52°36′24″N 1°17′50″E		1372796	Upload Photo	Q17531331
10, Heigham Grove	II	10, Heigham Grove			8 April 1986	TG2206308524; 52°37′44″N 1°16′47″E		1372799	Upload Photo	Q26653859
The Cedars	II	11, Heigham Grove			5 June 1972	TG2202408526; 52°37′45″N 1°16′45″E		1210037	Upload Photo	Q26505082
The Grove	II	12, Heigham Grove			5 June 1972	TG2208208474; 52°37′43″N 1°16′48″E		1209881	Upload Photo	Q26504930
Craster House and Attached Gates	II	13, Heigham Grove			5 June 1972	TG2211608488; 52°37′43″N 1°16′50″E		1372798	Upload Photo	Q26653858
14, Heigham Grove	II	14, Heigham Grove			5 June 1972	TG2211908512; 52°37′44″N 1°16′50″E		1210008	Upload Photo	Q26505053
The Elms	II	19, Heigham Grove			8 April 1986	TG2215308611; 52°37′47″N 1°16′52″E		1051259	Upload Photo	Q26303170
20, Heigham Grove	II	20, Heigham Grove			8 April 1986	TG2215308622; 52°37′47″N 1°16′52″E		1210009	Upload Photo	Q26505054
St Ouen	II	56, Heigham Grove			5 June 1972	TG2206608581; 52°37′46″N 1°16′48″E		1051260	Upload Photo	Q26303171
Gate Pieces and Forecourt Walls to Number 256	II	Heigham Street			8 April 1986	TG2193909755; 52°38′24″N 1°16′44″E		1051222	Upload Photo	Q26303138
Dolphin Inn	II*	256, Heigham Street			26 February 1954	TG2195009766; 52°38′25″N 1°16′44″E		1372818	Upload Photo	Q17531380
Gibraltar Gardens Public House	II	288, Heigham Street, Heigham			26 February 1954	TG2180809852; 52°38′28″N 1°16′37″E		1051223	Upload Photo	Q26303139
Low Road	II	Hellesdon, NR6 5AT			1 June 2017	TG2005110561; 52°38′53″N 1°15′05″E		1446265	Upload Photo	Q66478760
Barn at Hill House Farm	II	Hellesdon Hall Road			20 March 1981	TG2013110396; 52°38′48″N 1°15′09″E		1372819	Upload Photo	Q26653874
Hellesdon House	II	Hellesdon Mill Lane, Hellesdon			5 June 1972	TG1993010426; 52°38′49″N 1°14′59″E		1051224	Upload Photo	Q26303140
Old Stables to Hellesdon House	II	Hellesdon Mill Lane, Hellesdon			5 June 1972	TG1993810426; 52°38′49″N 1°14′59″E		1051225	Upload Photo	Q26303141
The Marlpit Public House	II	Hellesdon Road, Hellesdon			5 June 1972	TG1973709894; 52°38′32″N 1°14′47″E		1051226	Upload Photo	Q26303142
Hill House	II	Hill House Road			4 August 1993	TG2432708519; 52°37′41″N 1°18′48″E		1116717	Upload Photo	Q26410307
Lakenham First School	II	Hospital Lane			5 June 1972	TG2337507266; 52°37′02″N 1°17′54″E		1051227	Upload Photo	Q26303143
Eaton Old Hall (flats 32-43)	II	Hurd Road			5 June 1972	TG2055906976; 52°36′57″N 1°15′24″E		1051228	Upload Photo	Q26303144
1, 1a, 8a, 1b, Ice House Lane	II	1, 1a, 8a, 1b, Ice House Lane			29 September 1981	TG2382207506; 52°37′09″N 1°18′18″E		1051229	Upload Photo	Q26303145
9-12, Ice House Lane	II	9-12, Ice House Lane			1 July 1981	TG2383607472; 52°37′08″N 1°18′19″E		1210141	Upload Photo	Q26505185
Lodge to Town Close House	II	Ipswich Road			5 June 1972	TG2244907256; 52°37′03″N 1°17′05″E		1210162	Upload Photo	Q26505207
2, Ipswich Road	II	2, Ipswich Road			9 June 1972	TG2258207683; 52°37′17″N 1°17′13″E		1372820	Upload Photo	Q26653875
Point Cottage	II	4, Ipswich Road			5 June 1972	TG2257407677; 52°37′16″N 1°17′12″E		1210145	Upload Photo	Q26505189
8, Ipswich Road	II	8, Ipswich Road			5 June 1972	TG2250707539; 52°37′12″N 1°17′09″E		1051230	Upload Photo	Q26303146
10, Ipswich Road	II	10, Ipswich Road			5 June 1972	TG2249407508; 52°37′11″N 1°17′08″E		1210148	Upload Photo	Q26505192
12, Ipswich Road	II	12, Ipswich Road			5 June 1972	TG2245407482; 52°37′10″N 1°17′06″E		1051231	Upload Photo	Q26303147
Town Close Preparatory School	II	14, Ipswich Road			5 June 1972	TG2238007351; 52°37′06″N 1°17′01″E		1372821	Upload Photo	Q99937501
Gates, Gate Piers, Boundary Wall And Railings	II	Judges Drive (off Unthank Road)			27 September 2005	TG2086207006; 52°36′57″N 1°15′40″E		1391388	Upload Photo	Q26670752
143, Ketts Hill	II	143, Ketts Hill			5 June 1972	TG2445209132; 52°38′01″N 1°18′56″E		1292271	Upload Photo	Q26580300
Carrow House	II	King Street, NR1 2GA			8 April 1986	TG2402507477; 52°37′08″N 1°18′29″E		1292106	Upload Photo	Q26580155
Carrow Works Block 60	II	King Street			12 October 1993	TG2401607648; 52°37′13″N 1°18′29″E		1116887	Upload Photo	Q26410464
Carrow Works Block 92	II	King Street, NR1 2GA			12 October 1993	TG2403607611; 52°37′12″N 1°18′30″E		1116888	Upload Photo	Q26410465
Conservatory at Carrow House	II*	King Street, NR1 2GA			21 December 2021	TG2403707448; 52°37′07″N 1°18′30″E		1479038	Upload Photo	Q111853552
7, Launceston Terrace	II	7, Launceston Terrace			5 June 1972	TG2249507659; 52°37′16″N 1°17′08″E		1292005	Upload Photo	Q26580065
Gates, Gate Piers And Boundary Wall Of Number 2	II	2, Lime Tree Road			8 April 1986	TG2199407109; 52°36′59″N 1°16′40″E		1218388	Upload Photo	Q26513025
The Larches	II	2, Lime Tree Road			5 June 1972	TG2201207130; 52°37′00″N 1°16′41″E		1372810	Upload Photo	Q26653866
Fairfield	II	4, Lime Tree Road			8 April 1986	TG2206707093; 52°36′58″N 1°16′44″E		1051211	Upload Photo	Q26303127
Forecourt Wall, Gates And Gate Piers To Numbers 6 and 8, 6 and 8	II	6 and 8, 6 and 8, Lime Tree Road			5 June 1972	TG2209307040; 52°36′56″N 1°16′45″E		1291982	Upload Photo	Q26580042
8, Lime Tree Road	II	8, Lime Tree Road			5 June 1972	TG2210807060; 52°36′57″N 1°16′46″E		1372811	Upload Photo	Q26653867
Lime Tree House	II	10, Lime Tree Road			5 June 1972	TG2213207043; 52°36′57″N 1°16′47″E		1051212	Upload Photo	Q26303128
12, Lime Tree Road	II	12, Lime Tree Road			5 June 1972	TG2215707028; 52°36′56″N 1°16′49″E		1218418	Upload Photo	Q26513051
Forecourt Wall, Gates And Gatepiers To Number 12	II	12, Lime Tree Road			8 April 1986	TG2214407008; 52°36′55″N 1°16′48″E		1051213	Upload Photo	Q26303129
Inverleith	II*	13, Lime Tree Road			11 February 2004	TG2199407045; 52°36′57″N 1°16′40″E		1391059	Upload Photo	Q17531420
The Croft	II	14, Lime Tree Road			5 June 1972	TG2218407013; 52°36′55″N 1°16′50″E		1291957	Upload Photo	Q26580020
Christ Church	II	Macdalen Road			9 December 1987	TG2321610236; 52°38′38″N 1°17′53″E		1051766	Upload Photo	Q26303606
Elm Terrace	II	135-145, Magdalen Road			6 February 1981	TG2317810129; 52°38′35″N 1°17′50″E		1291814	Upload Photo	Q26579890
Mill House	II	Mansfield Lane, Lakenham			5 June 1972	TG2354106147; 52°36′25″N 1°18′00″E		1051198	Upload Photo	Q26303117
161, Mansfield Lane	II	161, Mansfield Lane			5 June 1972	TG2358806201; 52°36′27″N 1°18′03″E		1219018	Upload Photo	Q26513594
Harford Hills	II	Marston Lane			5 June 1972	TG2195605542; 52°36′08″N 1°16′34″E		1291674	Upload Photo	Q26579765
2, Mile Cross Road	II	2, Mile Cross Road, Heigham			4 July 1978	TG2178909804; 52°38′26″N 1°16′36″E		1051199	Upload Photo	Q26303118
2, 2a and 2b, Mile End Road	II	2, 2a and 2b, Mile End Road			5 June 1972	TG2162907146; 52°37′01″N 1°16′21″E		1291677	Upload Photo	Q26579768
16 and 18, Mill Hill Road	II	16 and 18, Mill Hill Road			28 September 1973	TG2198508544; 52°37′45″N 1°16′43″E		1372845	Upload Photo	Q26653897
Terrace Steps And Balustrade In Front Of Numbers 16 and 18, 16 and 18	II	16 and 18, 16 and 18, Mill Hill Road			8 April 1986	TG2197408544; 52°37′45″N 1°16′43″E		1219053	Upload Photo	Q26513624
20 and 22, Mill Hill Road	II	20 and 22, Mill Hill Road			28 September 1973	TG2198508520; 52°37′44″N 1°16′43″E		1051200	Upload Photo	Q26303119
Terrace Steps And Balustrade In Front Of Numbers 20 and 22, 20 and 22	II	20 and 22, 20 and 22, Mill Hill Road			8 April 1986	TG2197408521; 52°37′45″N 1°16′43″E		1219059	Upload Photo	Q26513630
24 and 26, Mill Hill Road	II	24 and 26, Mill Hill Road			28 September 1973	TG2198408496; 52°37′44″N 1°16′43″E		1051201	Upload Photo	Q26303120
Terrace Steps And Balustrade In Front Of Numbers 24 and 26, 24 and 26	II	24 and 26, 24 and 26, Mill Hill Road			8 April 1986	TG2197408497; 52°37′44″N 1°16′43″E		1219065	Upload Photo	Q26513634
Trowse House	II	Mill Lane			6 December 1989	TG2434906950; 52°36′50″N 1°18′45″E		1051767	Upload Photo	Q26303607
4-18, Mornington Road	II	4-18, Mornington Road			8 April 1986	TG2135707629; 52°37′17″N 1°16′08″E		1291606	Upload Photo	Q26579705
2, Mount Pleasant	II	2, Mount Pleasant			5 June 1972	TG2212707429; 52°37′09″N 1°16′48″E		1051202	Upload Photo	Q26303121
4 and 6, Mount Pleasant	II	4 and 6, Mount Pleasant			5 June 1972	TG2211607444; 52°37′09″N 1°16′48″E		1291622	Upload Photo	Q26579720
Wellington Place	II	8-14, Mount Pleasant			5 June 1972	TG2209907463; 52°37′10″N 1°16′47″E		1372443	Upload Photo	Q26653565
28, Mount Pleasant	II	28, Mount Pleasant			5 June 1972	TG2204807533; 52°37′12″N 1°16′44″E		1051941	Upload Photo	Q26303754
36 and 38, Mount Pleasant	II	36 and 38, Mount Pleasant			5 June 1972	TG2201307583; 52°37′14″N 1°16′42″E		1372444	Upload Photo	Q26653566
58, Mount Pleasant	II	58, Mount Pleasant			5 June 1972	TG2192707681; 52°37′17″N 1°16′38″E		1051942	Upload Photo	Q26303755
60, Mount Pleasant	II	60, Mount Pleasant			12 February 1971	TG2188607711; 52°37′18″N 1°16′36″E		1372445	Upload Photo	Q26653567
62, Mount Pleasant	II	62, Mount Pleasant			5 June 1972	TG2187207723; 52°37′19″N 1°16′35″E		1051943	Upload Photo	Q26303756
Hill House	II	64, Mount Pleasant			5 June 1972	TG2185907728; 52°37′19″N 1°16′35″E		1051944	Upload Photo	Q26303757
Hillcrest	II	69a, Mount Pleasant			5 June 1972	TG2179907715; 52°37′19″N 1°16′31″E		1372446	Upload Photo	Q26653568
Forecourt Wall, Gates And Gate Piers To No. 69a	II	69a, Mount Pleasant			8 April 1986	TG2183407740; 52°37′19″N 1°16′33″E		1051945	Upload Photo	Q26303758
Cringleford Bridge	II*	Newmarket Road			19 October 1951	TG1998305952; 52°36′24″N 1°14′51″E		1050565	Upload Photo	Q17557005
Eaton War Memorial	II	Newmarket Road			29 January 2018	TG2060406475; 52°36′40″N 1°15′25″E		1453264	Upload Photo	Q66479386
Forecourt Wall and Railings to Number 2	II	Newmarket Road			5 June 1972	TG2256607685; 52°37′17″N 1°17′12″E		1291481	Upload Photo	Q26579593
2, Newmarket Road	II	2, Newmarket Road			5 June 1972	TG2257607686; 52°37′17″N 1°17′13″E		1372451	Upload Photo	Q26653573
4, Newmarket Road	II	4, Newmarket Road			5 June 1972	TG2256707660; 52°37′16″N 1°17′12″E		1051957	Upload Photo	Q26303772
Annesley Hotel	II	6, Newmarket Road			5 June 1972	TG2254507633; 52°37′15″N 1°17′11″E		1051958	Upload Photo	Q26303774
Forecourt Wall and Railings to Number 6	II	6, Newmarket Road			5 June 1972	TG2252807651; 52°37′16″N 1°17′10″E		1219447	Upload Photo	Q26513991
Annesley Hotel	II	8, Newmarket Road			5 June 1972	TG2252507617; 52°37′14″N 1°17′10″E		1372452	Upload Photo	Q26687065
10, Newmarket Road	II	10, Newmarket Road			5 June 1972	TG2250607602; 52°37′14″N 1°17′09″E		1219451	Upload Photo	Q26513996
12 and 14, Newmarket Road	II	12 and 14, Newmarket Road			5 June 1972	TG2248707586; 52°37′14″N 1°17′08″E		1051959	Upload Photo	Q26303775
16 and 18, Newmarket Road	II	16 and 18, Newmarket Road			5 June 1972	TG2246807571; 52°37′13″N 1°17′07″E		1219453	Upload Photo	Q26513998
20, Newmarket Road	II	20, Newmarket Road			5 June 1972	TG2245207557; 52°37′13″N 1°17′06″E		1372453	Upload Photo	Q26653575
28, Newmarket Road	II	28, Newmarket Road			5 June 1972	TG2239407508; 52°37′11″N 1°17′02″E		1291457	Upload Photo	Q26579572
29 and 31, Newmarket Road	II	29 and 31, Newmarket Road			5 June 1972	TG2238307588; 52°37′14″N 1°17′02″E		1051947	Upload Photo	Q26303760
30 and 32, Newmarket Road	II	30 and 32, Newmarket Road			5 June 1972	TG2237607490; 52°37′11″N 1°17′01″E		1051960	Upload Photo	Q26303776
33a, Newmarket Road	II	33a, Newmarket Road			5 June 1972	TG2235207574; 52°37′13″N 1°17′00″E		1051948	Upload Photo	Q26303761
The Eagles Public House	II	33, Newmarket Road			5 June 1972	TG2236907577; 52°37′13″N 1°17′01″E		1219267	Upload Photo	Q26513820
35 and 37, Newmarket Road	II	35 and 37, Newmarket Road			5 June 1972	TG2235107560; 52°37′13″N 1°17′00″E		1051949	Upload Photo	Q26303763
39, Newmarket Road	II	39, Newmarket Road			5 June 1972	TG2233707552; 52°37′13″N 1°17′00″E		1219279	Upload Photo	Q26513833
45 and 45a, Newmarket Road	II	45 and 45a, Newmarket Road			5 June 1972	TG2228807513; 52°37′11″N 1°16′57″E		1051950	Upload Photo	Q26303764
47-69, Newmarket Road	II	47-69, Newmarket Road			5 June 1972	TG2222207488; 52°37′11″N 1°16′53″E		1291532	Upload Photo	Q26579637
71, Newmarket Road	II	71, Newmarket Road			5 June 1972	TG2219707439; 52°37′09″N 1°16′52″E		1051951	Upload Photo	Q26303765
73 and 75, Newmarket Road	II	73 and 75, Newmarket Road			5 June 1972	TG2218307428; 52°37′09″N 1°16′51″E		1219315	Upload Photo	Q26513867
77, 77b, 77c, 77d, 79 and 81, Newmarket Road	II	77, 77b, 77c, 77d, 79 and 81, Newmarket Road			5 June 1972	TG2216107415; 52°37′08″N 1°16′50″E		1051952	Upload Photo	Q26303766
82, Newmarket Road	II	82, Newmarket Road			5 June 1972	TG2224707356; 52°37′06″N 1°16′54″E		1372471	Upload Photo	Q26653591
83, Newmarket Road	II	83, Newmarket Road			5 June 1972	TG2212007393; 52°37′08″N 1°16′48″E		1219340	Upload Photo	Q26513891
Fernley	II	84, Newmarket Road			5 June 1972	TG2217207329; 52°37′06″N 1°16′50″E		1051921	Upload Photo	Q26303736
85, Newmarket Road	II	85, Newmarket Road			5 June 1972	TG2210707386; 52°37′08″N 1°16′47″E		1372448	Upload Photo	Q26653570
86, Newmarket Road	II	86, Newmarket Road			5 June 1972	TG2214007321; 52°37′05″N 1°16′48″E		1372472	Upload Photo	Q26653592
87, Newmarket Road	II	87, Newmarket Road			5 June 1972	TG2209407379; 52°37′07″N 1°16′46″E		1291514	Upload Photo	Q26579623
88, Newmarket Road	II	88, Newmarket Road			5 June 1972	TG2211707305; 52°37′05″N 1°16′47″E		1051922	Upload Photo	Q26303738
89, Newmarket Road	II	89, Newmarket Road			5 June 1972	TG2208007369; 52°37′07″N 1°16′45″E		1051953	Upload Photo	Q26303767
92, Newmarket Road	II	92, Newmarket Road			5 June 1972	TG2202307244; 52°37′03″N 1°16′42″E		1372473	Upload Photo	Q26653593
Eaton Grove - Norwich High School for Girls	II	95, Newmarket Road			5 June 1972	TG2187707319; 52°37′06″N 1°16′35″E		1372449	Upload Photo	Q26653571
97, Newmarket Road	II	97, Newmarket Road			5 June 1972	TG2173807218; 52°37′03″N 1°16′27″E		1291517	Upload Photo	Q26579625
Forecourt Wall and Gatepiers to Number 99	II	99, Newmarket Road			5 June 1972	TG2177307157; 52°37′01″N 1°16′29″E		1051955	Upload Photo	Q26303770
Wentworth	II	99, Newmarket Road			5 June 1972	TG2171807202; 52°37′02″N 1°16′26″E		1291519	Upload Photo	Q26579627
Elmhurst	II	105, Newmarket Road			5 June 1972	TG2166807128; 52°37′00″N 1°16′23″E		1219361	Upload Photo	Q26513912
107, Newmarket Road	II	107, Newmarket Road			5 June 1972	TG2162107102; 52°36′59″N 1°16′20″E		1372450	Upload Photo	Q26653572
109, Newmarket Road	II	109, Newmarket Road			5 June 1972	TG2160307089; 52°36′59″N 1°16′19″E		1291488	Upload Photo	Q26579600
113, Newmarket Road	II	113, Newmarket Road			5 June 1972	TG2154807066; 52°36′58″N 1°16′16″E		1051956	Upload Photo	Q26303771
115, Newmarket Road	II	115, Newmarket Road			5 June 1972	TG2153007050; 52°36′58″N 1°16′15″E		1219411	Upload Photo	Q26513957
21-25, Old Grove Court	II	21-25, Old Grove Court			4 October 1976	TG2263710937; 52°39′02″N 1°17′24″E		1219558	Upload Photo	Q26514096
1-6, Old School Court	II	1-6, Old School Court, NR1 2DZ			5 June 1972	TG2367207614; 52°37′13″N 1°18′11″E		1205677	Upload Photo	Q26500986
The Laurels	II	1 and 2, Orwell Road			5 June 1972	TG2227807139; 52°36′59″N 1°16′55″E		1291387	Upload Photo	Q26579507
Mousehold House	II	Pilling Park Road			26 February 1954	TG2495308909; 52°37′53″N 1°19′22″E		1219708	Upload Photo	Q26514235
Former Primitive Mehodist Chapel	II	Queens Road			5 July 1978	TG2321007768; 52°37′18″N 1°17′46″E		1220235	Upload Photo	Q26514722
113, Queens Road	II	113, Queens Road			8 April 1986	TG2312907810; 52°37′20″N 1°17′42″E		1220217	Upload Photo	Q26514707
Phoenix House	II	131 and 133, Queens Road			8 April 1986	TG2319407775; 52°37′19″N 1°17′46″E		1372468	Upload Photo	Q26653588
177 and 179, Queens Road	II	177 and 179, Queens Road			8 April 1986	TG2331607719; 52°37′17″N 1°17′52″E		1051916	Upload Photo	Q26303732
181 and 183, Queen's Road	II	181 and 183, Queen's Road			8 April 1986	TG2332507716; 52°37′17″N 1°17′52″E		1220255	Upload Photo	Q26514739
185, Queen's Road	II	185, Queen's Road			8 April 1986	TG2333707712; 52°37′16″N 1°17′53″E		1051917	Upload Photo	Q26303733
187 and 189, Queen's Road	II	187 and 189, Queen's Road			8 April 1986	TG2334307710; 52°37′16″N 1°17′53″E		1220258	Upload Photo	Q26514741
191, Queen's Road	II	191, Queen's Road			8 April 1986	TG2335007704; 52°37′16″N 1°17′54″E		1372469	Upload Photo	Q26653589
193, Queen's Road	II	193, Queen's Road			8 April 1986	TG2336007703; 52°37′16″N 1°17′54″E		1291061	Upload Photo	Q26579211
Forecourt Wall	II	Railings, Gates And Gatepiers To Number 97, 97, Newmarket Road			5 June 1972	TG2179907173; 52°37′01″N 1°16′30″E		1051954	Upload Photo	Q26303768
1-5, Railway Cottages	II	1-5, Railway Cottages, Hardy Road, NR1 1JW			1 April 1982	TG2441407972; 52°37′23″N 1°18′51″E		1292463	Upload Photo	Q26683840
6-11, Railway Cottages	II	6-11, Railway Cottages, Hardy Road, NR1 1JW			1 April 1982	TG2444307957; 52°37′23″N 1°18′52″E		1051255	Upload Photo	Q26303166
Lollards Pit	II	69-71, Riverside Road, NR1 1SR			5 June 1972	TG2403808970; 52°37′56″N 1°18′33″E		1051884	Upload Photo	Q26303706
Chapel at Rosary Cemetery	II	Rosary Road			5 June 1972	TG2431008441; 52°37′38″N 1°18′46″E		1291030	Upload Photo	Q26579184
Chalk Hill House	II	19 and 19a, Rosary Road			5 June 1972	TG2407808865; 52°37′53″N 1°18′35″E		1051885	Upload Photo	Q26303707
79-89, Rosary Road	II	79-89, Rosary Road			5 June 1972	TG2406008601; 52°37′44″N 1°18′34″E		1051886	Upload Photo	Q26303708
Rosary Cemetery Lodge	II	143, Rosary Road			7 January 1991	TG2423308389; 52°37′37″N 1°18′42″E		1372543	Upload Photo	Q26653653
The Lodge	II	Sandy Lane, Lakenham			26 February 1954	TG2343206057; 52°36′23″N 1°17′54″E		1210544	Upload Photo	Q26505594
Eaton Park	II	South Park Avenue, Eaton Park			13 January 1995	TG2060407256; 52°37′06″N 1°15′27″E		1343646	Upload Photo	Q26627429
Eaton Park	II	South Park Avenue, Eaton Park			13 January 1995	TG2092907547; 52°37′15″N 1°15′45″E		1319718	Upload Photo	Q26605787
Eaton Park	II	South Park Avenue, Eaton Pakr			13 January 1995	TG2058507531; 52°37′15″N 1°15′26″E		1343649	Upload Photo	Q26627432
Eaton Park	II	South Park Avenue, Eaton Park			13 January 1995	TG2054707481; 52°37′13″N 1°15′24″E		1343650	Upload Photo	Q26627433
Eaton Park	II	South Park Avenue, Eaton Park			13 January 1995	TG2056707506; 52°37′14″N 1°15′25″E		1068852	Upload Photo	Q26321547
Eaton Park	II	South Park Avenue, Eaton Park			13 January 1995	TG2059607315; 52°37′08″N 1°15′27″E		1068849	Upload Photo	Q26321543
Eaton Park	II	South Park Avenue, Eaton Park			13 January 1995	TG2058407396; 52°37′10″N 1°15′26″E		1068850	Upload Photo	Q26321544
Eaton Park	II	South Park Avenue, Eaton Park			13 January 1995	TG2057707436; 52°37′11″N 1°15′26″E		1068851	Upload Photo	Q26321546
Eaton Park	II	South Park Avenue, Eaton Park			13 January 1995	TG2054207525; 52°37′14″N 1°15′24″E		1068854	Upload Photo	Q26321549
South-east Quadrant Pavilion at Eaton Park	II	South Park Avenue, Eaton Park			13 January 1995	TG2059207488; 52°37′13″N 1°15′27″E		1343651	Upload Photo	Q26627434
The Castle Public House	II	1, Spitalfields			5 June 1972	TG2407309261; 52°38′05″N 1°18′36″E		1372497	The Castle Public House More images	Q26653612
Hill Farm Cottages	II	Sprowston Road			5 June 1972	TG2385910582; 52°38′48″N 1°18′28″E		1290433	Upload Photo	Q26578640
Lazar House	II*	219, Sprowston Road			26 February 1954	TG2356510413; 52°38′43″N 1°18′12″E		1051828	Upload Photo	Q17557185
Remains of Church of St Bartholomew	II	St Bartholomew's Close, Heigham			26 February 1954	TG2164709736; 52°38′24″N 1°16′28″E		1220642	Upload Photo	Q17646091
15 and 17, St Stephen' Square	II	15 and 17, St Stephen' Square			5 June 1972	TG2270908002; 52°37′27″N 1°17′20″E		1051822	Upload Photo	Q26303657
Norfolk and Norwich Hospital (administrative Block and Main Hall)	II	St Stephen's Road			5 June 1972	TG2259907830; 52°37′21″N 1°17′14″E		1210495	Upload Photo	Q26505541
Norfolk and Norwich Hospital Chapel	II	St Stephen's Road			5 June 1972	TG2260607898; 52°37′23″N 1°17′15″E		1372477	Upload Photo	Q26653595
Norfolk and Norwich Hospital X-ray and Radiotherapy Departments and Former Out-patients' Accommodation	II	St Stephen's Road			5 June 1972	TG2266207878; 52°37′23″N 1°17′18″E		1051858	Upload Photo	Q26303683
Coachmaker's Arms Public House	II	9, St Stephen's Road			8 April 1986	TG2276707976; 52°37′26″N 1°17′23″E		1372514	Upload Photo	Q26653626
24, St Stephen's Road	II	24, St Stephen's Road			5 June 1972	TG2276007925; 52°37′24″N 1°17′23″E		1210518	Upload Photo	Q26505564
30, St Stephen's Road	II	30, St Stephen's Road			5 June 1972	TG2273807893; 52°37′23″N 1°17′22″E		1372517	Upload Photo	Q26653629
Numbers 54 to 66 Including Attached Area Railings	II	54-66, St Stephen's Road			5 June 1972	TG2268307809; 52°37′20″N 1°17′19″E		1372533	Upload Photo	Q26653643
68-78, St Stephen's Road	II	68-78, St Stephen's Road			5 June 1972	TG2266207774; 52°37′19″N 1°17′17″E		1051820	Upload Photo	Q26303655
3-11 and 11a, St Stephen's Square	II	3-11 and 11a, St Stephen's Square			5 June 1972	TG2272308017; 52°37′27″N 1°17′21″E		1051821	Upload Photo	Q26303656
21 and 23, St Stephen's Square	II	21 and 23, St Stephen's Square			5 June 1972	TG2269207969; 52°37′26″N 1°17′19″E		1051823	Upload Photo	Q26303658
25-31, St Stephen's Square	II	25-31, St Stephen's Square			5 June 1972	TG2268207953; 52°37′25″N 1°17′19″E		1051824	Upload Photo	Q26303659
33 and 35, St Stephen's Square	II	33 and 35, St Stephen's Square			5 June 1972	TG2267307937; 52°37′25″N 1°17′18″E		1051825	Upload Photo	Q26303660
37, St Stephen's Square	II	37, St Stephen's Square			5 June 1972	TG2266807926; 52°37′24″N 1°17′18″E		1372496	Upload Photo	Q26653611
39 and 41, St Stephen's Square	II	39 and 41, St Stephen's Square			5 June 1972	TG2267407918; 52°37′24″N 1°17′18″E		1051826	Upload Photo	Q26303661
St Matthew's Church Driveway	II	Telegraph Lane West, Thorpe Hamlet, NR1 4JJ			29 May 2018	TG2434608856; 52°37′52″N 1°18′49″E		1454118	Upload Photo	Q66479458
Numbers 8 and 8a and Adjoining Garden Wall to South East	II	The Crescent (off Chapel Field Road)			5 June 1972	TG2254708127; 52°37′31″N 1°17′12″E		1206547	Upload Photo	Q26501751
1-7, The Crescent (off Chapel Field Road)	II	1-7, The Crescent (off Chapel Field Road)			5 June 1972	TG2256208175; 52°37′32″N 1°17′13″E		1051290	Upload Photo	Q26303197
9-18, The Crescent (off Chapel Field Road)	II	9-18, The Crescent (off Chapel Field Road)			5 June 1972	TG2261608121; 52°37′31″N 1°17′16″E		1051291	Upload Photo	Q26303198
113 St Leonard's Road, Thorpe Hamlet	II	113 St Leonard's Road, Thorpe Hamlet, NR1 4JF			25 August 2020	TG2426209043; 52°37′58″N 1°18′45″E		1470845	Upload Photo	Q98785858
Coach and Horses Public House	II	Thorpe Road			5 June 1972	TG2418108397; 52°37′37″N 1°18′39″E		1290375	Upload Photo	Q26578583
Norwich Railway Station	II	Thorpe Road			8 April 1986	TG2389808366; 52°37′37″N 1°18′24″E		1051837	Upload Photo	Q389902
Britannia Chambers and Attached Area Railings	II	22, Thorpe Road			5 June 1972	TG2393008452; 52°37′39″N 1°18′26″E		1290374	Upload Photo	Q26578582
60, Thorpe Road	II	60, Thorpe Road			5 June 1972	TG2407708436; 52°37′39″N 1°18′34″E		1372503	Upload Photo	Q26653618
1 and 2, Town Close Road	II	1 and 2, Town Close Road			5 June 1972	TG2226007300; 52°37′05″N 1°16′55″E		1051815	Upload Photo	Q26303650
3 and 4, Town Close Road	II	3 and 4, Town Close Road			5 June 1972	TG2228107279; 52°37′04″N 1°16′56″E		1210845	Upload Photo	Q26505887
5 and 6, Town Close Road	II	5 and 6, Town Close Road			5 June 1972	TG2230607261; 52°37′03″N 1°16′57″E		1051816	Upload Photo	Q26303651
7 and 8, Town Close Road	II	7 and 8, Town Close Road			5 June 1972	TG2233407246; 52°37′03″N 1°16′59″E		1372531	Upload Photo	Q26653641
9, Town Close Road	II	9, Town Close Road			5 June 1972	TG2235907236; 52°37′02″N 1°17′00″E		1365726	Upload Photo	Q26647384
10, Town Close Road	II	10, Town Close Road			5 June 1972	TG2240207224; 52°37′02″N 1°17′02″E		1051817	Upload Photo	Q26303652
12 and 13, Town Close Road	II	12 and 13, Town Close Road			5 June 1972	TG2231007193; 52°37′01″N 1°16′57″E		1210864	Upload Photo	Q26505906
Church of the Holy Trinity	II	110a, Trinity Street, NR2 2BJ			8 April 1986	TG2213908049; 52°37′29″N 1°16′50″E		1372806	Upload Photo	Q26653863
Mill House	II	Trowse Millgate			5 June 1972	TG2433206912; 52°36′49″N 1°18′44″E		1372532	Upload Photo	Q26687067
Boundary Wall of Cathedral House and Roman Catholic Cathedral of St John the Baptist	II	Unthank Road			8 April 1986	TG2234008582; 52°37′46″N 1°17′02″E		1051818	Upload Photo	Q26303653
Cathedral House	II	Unthank Road			8 April 1986	TG2231808512; 52°37′44″N 1°17′01″E		1210874	Upload Photo	Q26505914
1, Unthank Road	II	1, Unthank Road, NR2 2PA			5 October 2007	TG2228408484; 52°37′43″N 1°16′59″E		1392268	Upload Photo	Q26671497
The Tuns Public House	II	2 and 2a, Unthank Road			5 June 1972	TG2240208547; 52°37′45″N 1°17′05″E		1051779	The Tuns Public House More images	Q26303619
37 and 39, Unthank Road	II	37 and 39, Unthank Road			5 June 1972	TG2206608275; 52°37′36″N 1°16′47″E		1210896	Upload Photo	Q26505938
Grove Terrace	II	41-47, Unthank Road			5 June 1972	TG2203108226; 52°37′35″N 1°16′45″E		1051819	Upload Photo	Q26303654
405, Unthank Road	II	405, Unthank Road			8 April 1986	TG2087007026; 52°36′58″N 1°15′40″E		1051778	Upload Photo	Q26303618
3-9, Valentine Street	II	3-9, Valentine Street			8 April 1986	TG2232308828; 52°37′54″N 1°17′02″E		1372550	Upload Photo	Q26653657
4-12, Valentine Street	II	4-12, Valentine Street			8 April 1986	TG2234508816; 52°37′53″N 1°17′03″E		1051784	Upload Photo	Q26303623
1, Victoria Street	II	1, Victoria Street			5 June 1972	TG2275807915; 52°37′24″N 1°17′23″E		1051785	Upload Photo	Q26303624
2, Victoria Street	II	2, Victoria Street			5 June 1972	TG2276607906; 52°37′23″N 1°17′23″E		1372551	Upload Photo	Q26653658
3 and 4, Victoria Street	II	3 and 4, Victoria Street			5 June 1972	TG2277607897; 52°37′23″N 1°17′24″E		1051786	Upload Photo	Q26303625
5 and 6, Victoria Street	II	5 and 6, Victoria Street			5 June 1972	TG2278907888; 52°37′23″N 1°17′24″E		1290266	Upload Photo	Q26578484
7 and 8, Victoria Street	II	7 and 8, Victoria Street			5 June 1972	TG2280207877; 52°37′22″N 1°17′25″E		1372552	Upload Photo	Q26653659
11 and 12, Victoria Street	II	11 and 12, Victoria Street			5 June 1972	TG2283407850; 52°37′22″N 1°17′27″E		1210959	Upload Photo	Q26505997
13, Victoria Street	II	13, Victoria Street			5 June 1972	TG2284507840; 52°37′21″N 1°17′27″E		1051787	Upload Photo	Q26303626
14, Victoria Street	II	14, Victoria Street			5 June 1972	TG2285607830; 52°37′21″N 1°17′28″E		1290228	Upload Photo	Q26578450
17, Victoria Street	II	17, Victoria Street			5 June 1972	TG2287807811; 52°37′20″N 1°17′29″E		1051788	Upload Photo	Q26303627
18 and 19, Victoria Street	II	18 and 19, Victoria Street			5 June 1972	TG2289407798; 52°37′20″N 1°17′30″E		1210962	Upload Photo	Q26506001
20 and 21, Victoria Street	II	20 and 21, Victoria Street			5 June 1972	TG2290707788; 52°37′19″N 1°17′30″E		1372515	Upload Photo	Q26653627
22 and 23, Victoria Street	II	22 and 23, Victoria Street			5 June 1972	TG2292207775; 52°37′19″N 1°17′31″E		1051789	Upload Photo	Q26303628
25, Victoria Street	II	25, Victoria Street			5 June 1972	TG2284707803; 52°37′20″N 1°17′27″E		1290226	Upload Photo	Q26578448
26 and 27, Victoria Street	II	26 and 27, Victoria Street			5 June 1972	TG2283507814; 52°37′20″N 1°17′27″E		1372516	Upload Photo	Q26653628
28 and 29, Victoria Street	II	28 and 29, Victoria Street			5 June 1972	TG2282107825; 52°37′21″N 1°17′26″E		1290206	Upload Photo	Q26578431
30, Victoria Street	II	30, Victoria Street			5 June 1972	TG2280807836; 52°37′21″N 1°17′25″E		1051790	Upload Photo	Q26303629
31-34, Victoria Street	II	31-34, Victoria Street			5 June 1972	TG2279407846; 52°37′21″N 1°17′24″E		1211078	Upload Photo	Q26506112
35 and 36, Victoria Street	II	35 and 36, Victoria Street			5 June 1972	TG2277507863; 52°37′22″N 1°17′24″E		1051791	Upload Photo	Q26303630
37 and 38, Victoria Street	II	37 and 38, Victoria Street			5 June 1972	TG2275607879; 52°37′23″N 1°17′23″E		1211081	Upload Photo	Q26506115
1 and 3, West Parade	II	1 and 3, West Parade			8 April 1986	TG2189008640; 52°37′48″N 1°16′38″E		1211184	Upload Photo	Q26506211
Teaching Wall and Raised Concourse	II	With Attached Walkways, At University Of East Anglia, Earlham Road, University Of East Anglia			16 October 2003	TG1931607559; 52°37′17″N 1°14′19″E		1390648	Upload Photo	Q26670031
Archway Approximately 160 Metres West South West of County Hall	II				8 April 1986	TG2378506927; 52°36′50″N 1°18′15″E		1280909	Upload Photo	Q26569999
Timber-drying bottle kiln at NGR TG2475007481	II				11 July 1996	TG2475007482; 52°37′07″N 1°19′07″E		1268401	Upload Photo	Q26558710

== See also ==
- Grade I listed buildings in Norfolk
- Grade II* listed buildings in Norfolk

== Sources ==
- Wilson, Bill; Pevsner, Nikolaus (1997) [1962], Norfolk 1: Norwich and North-East, The Buildings of England, New Haven and London: Yale University Press, ISBN 978-0-300-09607-1
