= Listed buildings in the borough of Great Yarmouth (civil parishes) =

Civil Parish in Norfolk, England

There are 21 civil parishes in the Borough of Great Yarmouth of Norfolk, England. They contain 181 listed buildings that are recorded in the National Heritage List for England. Of these six are grade I, 32 are grade II* and 143 are grade II.

This list is based on the information retrieved online from Historic England.

== Key ==
Grade	Criteria
I	Buildings that are of exceptional interest
II*	Particularly important buildings of more than special interest
II	Buildings that are of special interest

== Listing ==
=== Ashby with Oby ===
Name	Grade	Location	Type	Completed (Note: The date given is the date used by Historic England as significant for the initial building or that of an important part in the structure's description.)	Date designated	Grid ref. (Note: The grid reference is based on the British national grid reference system, sometimes known as OSGB36, used by the Ordnance Survey.) Geo-coordinates	Notes	Entry number (Note: The "List Entry Number" is a unique number assigned to each listed building and scheduled monument by Historic England.)	Image	Wikidata
Clippesby Mill at Tg 40921281	II				4 December 1987	TG4092712807; 52°39′34″N 1°33′40″E		1372905	Upload Photo	Q26653950
Wisemans Mill at Tg 40921379	II*		mill building		4 December 1987	TG4092213796; 52°40′06″N 1°33′42″E		1051014	Wisemans Mill at Tg 40921379 More images	Q17554399
Ashby Hall	II				20 February 1952	TG4193415730; 52°41′07″N 1°34′41″E		1051011	Upload Photo	Q26302937
Barn at Ashby Hall Farm	II				20 February 1952	TG4191215807; 52°41′09″N 1°34′40″E		1051012	Upload Photo	Q26302938
Manor Farmhouse	II				20 February 1952	TG4161114392; 52°40′24″N 1°34′21″E		1051013	Upload Photo	Q26302939

=== Belton with Browston ===
Name	Grade	Location	Type	Completed	Date designated	Grid ref. Geo-coordinates	Notes	Entry number	Image	Wikidata
Black Mill at Tg 467035	II				15 July 1988	TG4674703453; 52°34′22″N 1°38′24″E		1372930	Upload Photo	Q26653975
Browston Hall Hotel	II*	Browston Lane, Browston Green	hotel		27 November 1954	TG4997201741; 52°33′22″N 1°41′10″E		1051001	Browston Hall Hotel More images	Q17554382
The Manor House	II	Browston Lane, Browston Green			27 November 1954	TG4980501792; 52°33′24″N 1°41′02″E		1372931	Upload Photo	Q26653976
Barn at Beech Farm	II	Church Lane, Belton			15 July 1988	TG4848202473; 52°33′48″N 1°39′53″E		1051002	Upload Photo	Q26302930
Church of All Saints	II*	Church Lane, Belton, NR31 9JN	church building		27 November 1954	TG4855502949; 52°34′03″N 1°39′59″E		1372932	Church of All Saints More images	Q17554601
The Thatched Cottage	II	Church Lane			15 July 1988	TG4878403164; 52°34′10″N 1°40′11″E		1051003	Upload Photo	Q26302931
St John's Farmhouse	II	30, St John's Road			27 November 1954	TG4794903320; 52°34′16″N 1°39′27″E		1051004	Upload Photo	Q26302932
The Thatched Cottage	II	1, Station Road South			27 November 1954	TG4833402551; 52°33′51″N 1°39′46″E		1051005	Upload Photo	Q26302933
Belton Old Hall	II*	Station Road South			27 November 1954	TG4828802623; 52°33′53″N 1°39′43″E		1372933	Upload Photo	Q17554602

=== Burgh Castle ===
Name	Grade	Location	Type	Completed	Date designated	Grid ref. Geo-coordinates	Notes	Entry number	Image	Wikidata
Gariannonum Roman Fort	I		castrum		10 June 1953	TG4749704474; 52°34′54″N 1°39′07″E		1372902	Gariannonum Roman Fort More images	Q11680360
Church of St. Peter and St. Paul	II*	Church Road, NR31 9QG	church building		27 November 1954	TG4764004973; 52°35′10″N 1°39′15″E		1051008	Church of St. Peter and St. Paul More images	Q17554394
The Old Rectory	II	Church Road			27 November 1954	TG4758304941; 52°35′09″N 1°39′12″E		1172236	Upload Photo	Q26466934
The Grange	II	High Road			27 November 1954	TG4911605314; 52°35′19″N 1°40′35″E		1372903	Upload Photo	Q26653949
Old Hall Farmhouse	II	Lord's Lane			27 November 1954	TG4967604316; 52°34′45″N 1°41′02″E		1172254	Upload Photo	Q26466953

=== Caister-on-Sea ===
Name	Grade	Location	Type	Completed	Date designated	Grid ref. Geo-coordinates	Notes	Entry number	Image	Wikidata
The Never Turn Back Public House	II	NR30 5HG	pub		1 May 2018	TG5262212316; 52°38′59″N 1°44′00″E		1454945	The Never Turn Back Public House More images	Q55099397
Cemetery Chapel, Caister Cemetery	II	Caister Cemetery, Ormesby Road	cemetery chapel		4 December 1987	TG5186012611; 52°39′10″N 1°43′20″E		1216590	Cemetery Chapel, Caister Cemetery More images	Q26511366
Caister House	II	60, High Street			4 December 1987	TG5223512137; 52°38′54″N 1°43′39″E		1216588	Upload Photo	Q26511364
Church of Holy Trinity	II*	Norwich Road, Caister On Sea, NR30 5JN	church building		4 March 1947	TG5199612278; 52°38′59″N 1°43′26″E		1287563	Church of Holy Trinity More images	Q17554549
Beauchamp Lifeboat Memorial, Caister-on-sea	II	Ormesby Road, Caister, NR30 5JZ			29 May 2020	TG5200712340; 52°39′01″N 1°43′27″E		1468694	Upload Photo	Q96483202
The Grange	II	Upper Grange Crescent			4 March 1947	TG5166111938; 52°38′48″N 1°43′08″E		1227760	Upload Photo	Q26521652
The Farmhouse	II	West Road			3 October 1988	TG5149211949; 52°38′49″N 1°42′59″E		1216612	Upload Photo	Q26511384

=== Filby ===
Name	Grade	Location	Type	Completed	Date designated	Grid ref. Geo-coordinates	Notes	Entry number	Image	Wikidata
Church of All Saints	II*	Church Lane, NR29 3HW	church building		25 September 1962	TG4690113224; 52°39′38″N 1°38′58″E		1287564	Church of All Saints More images	Q17554552
Filby War Memorial	II	Church Lane, NR29 3HW	war memorial		29 June 2017	TG4689313255; 52°39′39″N 1°38′58″E		1447584	Filby War Memorial More images	Q66478838
Chestnut House	II	Main Road			4 March 1947	TG4679013473; 52°39′46″N 1°38′53″E		1216591	Upload Photo	Q26511367
Barn at Grange Farm	II	Old Yarmouth Road			4 March 1947	TG4756813371; 52°39′41″N 1°39′34″E		1287509	Upload Photo	Q26576006
Filby House	II	Old Yarmouth Road			20 February 1952	TG4680513405; 52°39′44″N 1°38′54″E		1227785	Upload Photo	Q26521676
Garden Wall at Filby House	II	Old Yarmouth Road			4 December 1987	TG4677913386; 52°39′43″N 1°38′52″E		1216592	Upload Photo	Q26511368
Grange Farmhouse	II	Old Yarmouth Road			4 March 1947	TG4752813380; 52°39′42″N 1°39′32″E		1216594	Upload Photo	Q26511370
Summerhouse and Carriage House at Filby House	II	Old Yarmouth Road			4 March 1947	TG4671813410; 52°39′44″N 1°38′49″E		1216593	Upload Photo	Q26511369
Barn at the Homestead	II	Yarmouth Road			4 December 1987	TG4802613308; 52°39′39″N 1°39′58″E		1216595	Upload Photo	Q26511371

=== Fleggburgh ===
Name	Grade	Location	Type	Completed	Date designated	Grid ref. Geo-coordinates	Notes	Entry number	Image	Wikidata
Billockby Hall	II	Billockby			20 February 1952	TG4302613226; 52°39′44″N 1°35′33″E		1051015	Upload Photo	Q26302940
Church of All Saints	II	Billockby	church building		25 September 1962	TG4297113584; 52°39′56″N 1°35′31″E		1051016	Church of All Saints More images	Q26302941
High House Farmhouse	II	Billockby			4 December 1987	TG4357413331; 52°39′47″N 1°36′02″E		1372906	Upload Photo	Q26653952
Church of St Peter	II*	Clippesby	church building		25 September 1962	TG4284614588; 52°40′28″N 1°35′27″E		1051017	Church of St Peter More images	Q17554405
Burgh St Margaret War Memorial	II	Main Road, Fleggburgh (burgh St Margarets), NR29 3AG	war memorial		15 August 2017	TG4451613975; 52°40′06″N 1°36′54″E		1448377	Burgh St Margaret War Memorial More images	Q66478883
Church of St. Margaret	II*	Main Road, NR29 3AG, Burgh St Margaret	church building		25 September 1962	TG4449414010; 52°40′07″N 1°36′53″E		1372907	Church of St. Margaret More images	Q17554587
No Name Farmhouse	II	Marsh Road, Burgh St Margaret			4 December 1987	TG4401213058; 52°39′37″N 1°36′25″E		1152228	Upload Photo	Q26445167
Barn at Grange Farm	II	Rollesby Road, Burgh St Margaret			4 December 1987	TG4466114918; 52°40′36″N 1°37′04″E		1051018	Upload Photo	Q26302942
The Shrubbery	II	Rollesby Road, Burgh St Margaret			20 February 1952	TG4453514600; 52°40′26″N 1°36′56″E		1152231	Upload Photo	Q26445170
Wesleyan Chapel	II	Rollesby Road, Burgh St Margaret			4 December 1987	TG4444114261; 52°40′15″N 1°36′51″E		1372908	Upload Photo	Q26653953
Barn at Common Farm	II	Ruggs Lane, Burgh St Margaret			30 April 1981	TG4504313482; 52°39′49″N 1°37′20″E		1152303	Upload Photo	Q26445240
Common Farmhouse	II	Ruggs Lane, Burgh St Margaret			30 April 1981	TG4501713478; 52°39′49″N 1°37′19″E		1051019	Upload Photo	Q26302943
Ruins of Church of St Mary	II	Tower Road, Burgh St Margaret	church building		25 September 1962	TG4548214133; 52°40′09″N 1°37′45″E		1051020	Ruins of Church of St Mary More images	Q26302944

=== Fritton and St. Olaves ===
Name	Grade	Location	Type	Completed	Date designated	Grid ref. Geo-coordinates	Notes	Entry number	Image	Wikidata
Barn About 120 Metres North East of Caldecott Farmhouse	II	Back Lane, Fritton And St. Olaves			30 January 1992	TG4745001493; 52°33′18″N 1°38′56″E		1068829	Upload Photo	Q26321522
Barn at Caldecott Farm	II	Back Lane, Fritton, NR31 9EY, Fritton And St. Olaves			15 July 1988	TG4740401519; 52°33′19″N 1°38′54″E		1172307	Upload Photo	Q26467005
Barn 30 Metres East of Priory Farmhouse	II	Beccles Road, Fritton And St. Olaves			27 November 1954	TM4588099573; 52°32′18″N 1°37′28″E		1050968	Upload Photo	Q26302898
Garden Walls to the Priory	II	Beccles Road, St Olaves, Fritton And St. Olaves			15 July 1988	TM4581499516; 52°32′17″N 1°37′24″E		1372917	Upload Photo	Q26653964
Priory Farmhouse	II	Beccles Road, St Olaves, NR31 9HE, Fritton And St. Olaves			27 November 1954	TM4585499576; 52°32′19″N 1°37′26″E		1172320	Upload Photo	Q26467017
St. Olave's Priory	I	Beccles Road, St Olaves, Fritton And St. Olaves	monastery ruins		27 November 1954	TM4586099544; 52°32′18″N 1°37′27″E		1172374	St. Olave's Priory More images	Q7590878
The Bell Inn	II	Beccles Road, Fritton And St. Olaves	pub		27 November 1954	TM4576499420; 52°32′14″N 1°37′21″E		1050969	The Bell Inn More images	Q26302899
The Priory	II	Beccles Road, St Olaves, NR31 9HE, Fritton And St. Olaves			27 November 1954	TM4585799445; 52°32′14″N 1°37′26″E		1051010	Upload Photo	Q26302936
Church of St. Edmund	II*	Church Lane, Fritton, NR31 9HA, Fritton And St. Olaves	church building		27 November 1954	TG4732700143; 52°32′35″N 1°38′46″E		1372918	Church of St. Edmund More images	Q17554592
Fritton Old Hall	II*	Church Lane, Fritton And St. Olaves			27 November 1954	TG4760300145; 52°32′34″N 1°39′01″E		1305105	Upload Photo	Q17554574
Caldecott Mill at Tg 465021	II	Fritton And St. Olaves	building		15 July 1988	TG4642702102; 52°33′39″N 1°38′03″E		1051009	Caldecott Mill at Tg 465021 More images	Q26302935
Drainage Pump	II*	Fritton And St. Olaves, St Olave's Marsh	architectural structure		27 November 1954	TM4568499713; 52°32′23″N 1°37′18″E		1372904	Drainage Pump More images	Q17554583
Fritton Marsh Windpump at Tm 450998	II	Fritton And St. Olaves			15 July 1988	TM4502699783; 52°32′27″N 1°36′43″E		1172278	Upload Photo	Q26466975

=== Hemsby ===
Name	Grade	Location	Type	Completed	Date designated	Grid ref. Geo-coordinates	Notes	Entry number	Image	Wikidata
Decoy Farmhouse	II				4 December 1987	TG4748016057; 52°41′08″N 1°39′37″E		1227805	Upload Photo	Q26521695
Hemsby War Memorial	II	NR29 4EU	war memorial		1 June 2017	TG4945617417; 52°41′49″N 1°41′26″E		1446281	Hemsby War Memorial More images	Q66478764
Barn at Hall Farm	I	Hall Road			4 December 1987	TG4874216799; 52°41′30″N 1°40′46″E		1216597	Upload Photo	Q17536004
The Chimneys	II	Hall Road			4 December 1987	TG4897217040; 52°41′38″N 1°40′59″E		1216596	Upload Photo	Q26511372
The Lodge Including Lodge Cottage	II	Hall Road			20 February 1952	TG4892817069; 52°41′39″N 1°40′57″E		1227812	Upload Photo	Q26521702
Shariot Cottage	II	Pitt Road			4 December 1987	TG4926817419; 52°41′49″N 1°41′16″E		1287565	Upload Photo	Q26576057
Church of St. Mary the Virgin	II	The Street, NR29 4EU	church building		25 September 1962	TG4943617382; 52°41′48″N 1°41′24″E		1227819	Church of St. Mary the Virgin More images	Q26521708
Cross Base in St Mary's Churchyard 40 Metres South West of Tower	II	The Street			4 December 1987	TG4939417369; 52°41′47″N 1°41′22″E		1287566	Upload Photo	Q26576058
Cross Base in St Mary's Churchyard 45 Metres North of Chancel	II	The Street			4 December 1987	TG4945317406; 52°41′49″N 1°41′25″E		1216599	Upload Photo	Q26511374
Pair of Coffin Lids One Metre East of Chancel of Church of St Mary	II	The Street			4 December 1987	TG4945717379; 52°41′48″N 1°41′26″E		1216598	Upload Photo	Q26511373
Barn at Home Farm	II*	Water Lane			4 March 1947	TG4915917271; 52°41′45″N 1°41′09″E		1287567	Upload Photo	Q17554557
Home Farmhouse	II	Water Lane			4 March 1947	TG4923417277; 52°41′45″N 1°41′13″E		1216600	Upload Photo	Q26511375
Remains of Cross Shaft	II	Yarmouth Road			4 December 1987	TG4972016691; 52°41′25″N 1°41′38″E		1216601	Upload Photo	Q17673921

=== Hopton-on-Sea ===
Name	Grade	Location	Type	Completed	Date designated	Grid ref. Geo-coordinates	Notes	Entry number	Image	Wikidata
Old St Margaret's Church	II*	Coast Road	church building		27 November 1954	TM5301799972; 52°32′20″N 1°43′47″E		1050970	Old St Margaret's Church More images	Q17554357
Hopton Hall	II	Hall Road			27 November 1954	TG5147000580; 52°32′42″N 1°42′27″E		1050971	Upload Photo	Q26302900
Whitehouse Farmhouse	II	Hall Road			27 November 1954	TG5178600309; 52°32′33″N 1°42′43″E		1152277	Upload Photo	Q26445215
Church of St. Margaret	II*	Lowestoft Road, Hopton On Sea, NR31 9AH	church building		27 November 1954	TG5241500040; 52°32′23″N 1°43′15″E		1050972	Church of St. Margaret More images	Q17554367

=== Martham ===
Name	Grade	Location	Type	Completed	Date designated	Grid ref. Geo-coordinates	Notes	Entry number	Image	Wikidata
Martham Mill Tg 442192	II				4 December 1987	TG4425719277; 52°42′57″N 1°36′54″E		1372909	Upload Photo	Q26653955
Martham War Memorial, Churchyard of St Mary the Virgin	II		war memorial		9 November 2016	TG4549218408; 52°42′27″N 1°37′57″E		1438079	Martham War Memorial, Churchyard of St Mary the Virgin More images	Q66477931
The Gables Farm	II	Back Lane			20 February 1952	TG4587217961; 52°42′12″N 1°38′16″E		1152335	Upload Photo	Q26445270
The Grove	II	21, Black Street			4 December 1987	TG4554218103; 52°42′17″N 1°37′59″E		1051021	Upload Photo	Q26302945
The Vicarage Including Garden Walls to South	II	68, Black Street, NR29 4PR			20 February 1952	TG4545718433; 52°42′28″N 1°37′56″E		1372910	Upload Photo	Q26653957
Church of St. Mary	I	Black Street, NR29 4PR	church building		25 September 1962	TG4549718442; 52°42′29″N 1°37′58″E		1152351	Church of St. Mary More images	Q17535990
Cess Farmhouse	II	Cess Road			4 December 1987	TG4445717910; 52°42′13″N 1°37′01″E		1152372	Upload Photo	Q26445302
Old Hall Farmhouse	II	Hall Road			20 February 1952	TG4587917520; 52°41′58″N 1°38′16″E		1051023	Upload Photo	Q26302947
Pair of Attached Barns at Moregrove Farm	II	Moregrove Lane			4 December 1987	TG4545319061; 52°42′49″N 1°37′57″E		1152416	Upload Photo	Q26445342
Clarkes Farmhouse	II	Staithe Road			4 December 1987	TG4533518545; 52°42′32″N 1°37′50″E		1372911	Upload Photo	Q26653958
17, the Green	II	17, The Green			24 April 1974	TG4569817985; 52°42′13″N 1°38′07″E		1051022	Upload Photo	Q26302946
Brooklyn House	II	The Green			4 December 1987	TG4571318044; 52°42′15″N 1°38′08″E		1152386	Upload Photo	Q26445315
60-68, White Street	II	60-68, White Street			28 August 1980	TG4558318460; 52°42′29″N 1°38′02″E		1152438	Upload Photo	Q26445363

=== Mautby ===
Name	Grade	Location	Type	Completed	Date designated	Grid ref. Geo-coordinates	Notes	Entry number	Image	Wikidata
Runham Swim Windpump at Tg 47001000	II				15 July 1988	TG4700409983; 52°37′53″N 1°38′55″E		1050974	Upload Photo	Q26302902
Runham Windpump at Tg 47200988	II				15 July 1988	TG4719409876; 52°37′49″N 1°39′05″E		1152338	Upload Photo	Q26445273
Five Mile House Windpump at Tg 47790984	II				15 July 1988	TG4778609844; 52°37′47″N 1°39′36″E		1050973	Upload Photo	Q26302901
Mautby Marsh Windpump at Tg 48950989	II				15 July 1988	TG4895009920; 52°37′48″N 1°40′38″E		1152312	Upload Photo	Q26445248
Runham Manor Farm Cottages	II	Chapel Road			15 July 1988	TG4651210733; 52°38′18″N 1°38′31″E		1050975	Upload Photo	Q26302904
Mautby War Memorial	II	Church Lane, NR29 3JA	war memorial		24 March 2017	TG4805112360; 52°39′08″N 1°39′57″E		1444630	Mautby War Memorial More images	Q66478648
Runham Hall	II	Mautby Lane			15 July 1988	TG4653911018; 52°38′27″N 1°38′33″E		1050976	Upload Photo	Q26302905
Church of St. Peter and St. Paul	II*	Mill Road	church building		25 September 1962	TG4807112375; 52°39′08″N 1°39′58″E		1152350	Church of St. Peter and St. Paul More images	Q17554437
Church of St Peter and St Paul	II*	Runham Road, Runham	church building		25 September 1962	TG4597410827; 52°38′22″N 1°38′03″E		1050977	Church of St Peter and St Paul More images	Q17554373
Church of St Mary	II*	Stokesby Road, Thrigby	church building		25 September 1962	TG4605312393; 52°39′12″N 1°38′11″E		1152375	Church of St Mary More images	Q17554442
Summerhouse 250 Metres South-east of Thrigby Hall	II	Thrigby Road			15 July 1988	TG4633812349; 52°39′10″N 1°38′26″E		1372919	Upload Photo	Q26653965
Thrigby War Memorial	II	Thrigby Road, Thrigby	war memorial		18 June 2018	TG4604012389; 52°39′12″N 1°38′10″E		1455877	Thrigby War Memorial More images	Q66479607

=== Ormesby St. Margaret with Scratby ===
Name	Grade	Location	Type	Completed	Date designated	Grid ref. Geo-coordinates	Notes	Entry number	Image	Wikidata
Duncan Hall School	II	Ormesby St. Margaret With Scratby			4 December 1987	TG5017015397; 52°40′42″N 1°41′58″E		1216602	Upload Photo	Q26511377
War Memorial Cross at Ormesby St Margaret	II	2, Station Road, Ormesby St Margaret, NR29 3QB, Ormesby St. Margaret With Scratby	war memorial		18 May 2018	TG4959214748; 52°40′22″N 1°41′26″E		1455453	War Memorial Cross at Ormesby St Margaret More images	Q66479584
Barn 25 Metres North of Boarded Barn Farmhouse	II	Yarmouth Road, Ormesby St. Margaret With Scratby			4 March 1947	TG5122214327; 52°40′06″N 1°42′51″E		1287568	Upload Photo	Q26576059
Boarded Barn Farmhouse	II	Yarmouth Road, Ormesby St. Margaret With Scratby			4 March 1947	TG5123614285; 52°40′05″N 1°42′52″E		1227864	Upload Photo	Q26521751
Church of St. Margaret	II*	Yarmouth Road, Ormesby St Margaret, Ormesby St. Margaret With Scratby	church building		25 September 1962	TG4988714532; 52°40′15″N 1°41′41″E		1227867	Church of St. Margaret More images	Q17554474
Garden Walls to Ormesby Old Hall	II	Yarmouth Road, Ormesby St. Margaret With Scratby			4 December 1987	TG4998714518; 52°40′14″N 1°41′46″E		1216604	Upload Photo	Q26511379
Old Hall Cottage	II	Yarmouth Road, Ormesby St. Margaret With Scratby			4 December 1987	TG5010914491; 52°40′13″N 1°41′52″E		1216603	Upload Photo	Q26511378
Ormesby Lodge	II	Yarmouth Road, Ormesby St. Margaret With Scratby			4 December 1987	TG4961414687; 52°40′20″N 1°41′27″E		1227898	Upload Photo	Q26521780
Ormesby Old Hall	II*	Yarmouth Road, Ormesby St. Margaret With Scratby			20 February 1952	TG5003814501; 52°40′14″N 1°41′49″E		1287569	Upload Photo	Q17554561
Stables and Forecourt Walls to Ormesby Old Hall	II	Yarmouth Road, Ormesby St. Margaret With Scratby			4 December 1987	TG5007214496; 52°40′14″N 1°41′50″E		1287436	Upload Photo	Q26575936
The Grange Hotel	II	Yarmouth Road, Ormesby St. Margaret With Scratby			20 February 1952	TG5125314168; 52°40′01″N 1°42′52″E		1216605	Upload Photo	Q26511380

=== Ormesby St. Michael ===
Name	Grade	Location	Type	Completed	Date designated	Grid ref. Geo-coordinates	Notes	Entry number	Image	Wikidata
Little Ormesby Hall	II	Decoy Road, Ormesby St. Michael			4 December 1987	TG4888915586; 52°40′51″N 1°40′50″E		1287439	Upload Photo	Q26575939
Barn at Church Farm	II	Yarmouth Road, Ormesby St. Michael			4 December 1987	TG4784814815; 52°40′28″N 1°39′53″E		1287402	Upload Photo	Q26575905
Barn at Manor Farm with Attached Stable Block	II	Yarmouth Road, Ormesby St. Michael			20 February 1952	TG4885814896; 52°40′28″N 1°40′47″E		1216606	Upload Photo	Q26511381
Church of St. Michael	II*	Yarmouth Road, Ormesby St. Michael	church building		25 September 1962	TG4807514883; 52°40′29″N 1°40′05″E		1287570	Church of St. Michael More images	Q17554568
Manor Farmhouse	II	Yarmouth Road, Ormesby St. Michael			20 February 1952	TG4883314887; 52°40′28″N 1°40′46″E		1287398	Upload Photo	Q26575901
Ormesby Manor	II	Yarmouth Road, Ormesby St. Michael			4 March 1947	TG4790215104; 52°40′37″N 1°39′57″E		1287571	Upload Photo	Q26576060

=== Repps with Bastwick ===
Name	Grade	Location	Type	Completed	Date designated	Grid ref. Geo-coordinates	Notes	Entry number	Image	Wikidata
Potter Heigham Bridge	II*	Bridge Road	road bridge		20 February 1952	TG4199918473; 52°42′35″N 1°34′52″E		1152457	Potter Heigham Bridge More images	Q17554447
Potter Heigham Bridge	II*	Bridge Road, Potter Heigham, North Norfolk	road bridge		16 April 1955	TG4199818473; 52°42′35″N 1°34′52″E		1305009	Potter Heigham Bridge More images	Q17554447
Church of St. Peter and St. Paul	II*	Church Road, NR29 5JS	church building		25 September 1962	TG4219016927; 52°41′45″N 1°34′58″E		1051024	Church of St. Peter and St. Paul More images	Q17554415
Repps with Bastwick War Memorial	II	Church Road, NR29 5JS	war memorial		4 June 2018	TG4217816999; 52°41′47″N 1°34′58″E		1456644	Repps with Bastwick War Memorial More images	Q66479665
Cross Base at Tower House	II	Tower Road, Bastwick			4 December 1987	TG4263918108; 52°42′22″N 1°35′25″E		1304757	Upload Photo	Q26591698
Font at Tower House	II	Tower Road, Bastwick			4 December 1987	TG4264818112; 52°42′22″N 1°35′25″E		1051025	Upload Photo	Q26302948
Ruins of St Peters Chapel	II	Tower Road, Bastwick	chapel		25 September 1962	TG4263118129; 52°42′23″N 1°35′25″E		1372912	Ruins of St Peters Chapel More images	Q26653960

=== Rollesby ===
Name	Grade	Location	Type	Completed	Date designated	Grid ref. Geo-coordinates	Notes	Entry number	Image	Wikidata
Barn at Sowells Farm	II	Back Lane			4 December 1987	TG4515516207; 52°41′17″N 1°37′34″E		1372913	Upload Photo	Q26653961
The White House	II	Back Lane			4 December 1987	TG4495516214; 52°41′17″N 1°37′23″E		1152490	Upload Photo	Q26445411
The Old Court House	II	Court Road			4 December 1987	TG4559315091; 52°40′40″N 1°37′54″E		1051026	Upload Photo	Q26302949
Barn 15m North-east of Church Farmhouse	II	Fleggburgh Road			4 December 1987	TG4471115747; 52°41′03″N 1°37′09″E		1152575	Upload Photo	Q26445486
Barn 35m South-west of Church Farmhouse	II	Fleggburgh Road			4 December 1987	TG4469015690; 52°41′01″N 1°37′08″E		1152553	Upload Photo	Q26445467
Barn 50m South-west of Church Farmhouse	II	Fleggburgh Road			4 December 1987	TG4466815687; 52°41′01″N 1°37′06″E		1050990	Upload Photo	Q26302919
Church Farmhouse	II	Fleggburgh Road			20 February 1952	TG4470415726; 52°41′02″N 1°37′08″E		1372927	Upload Photo	Q26653972
Church of St. George	II*	Fleggburgh Road, NR29 5HH	church building		25 September 1962	TG4461915759; 52°41′03″N 1°37′04″E		1152526	Church of St. George More images	Q17554452
Old World Cottages	II	Fleggburgh Road			4 December 1987	TG4464515816; 52°41′05″N 1°37′06″E		1050991	Upload Photo	Q26302921
Rollesby War Memorial	II	Fleggburgh Road, NR29 5HW	war memorial		29 May 2018	TG4462615794; 52°41′04″N 1°37′04″E		1456610	Rollesby War Memorial More images	Q66479659
The Grange	II	Fleggburgh Road			4 December 1987	TG4464915936; 52°41′09″N 1°37′06″E		1372928	Upload Photo	Q26653973
The Old Rectory	II	2 and 3, Heath Road			4 December 1987	TG4458215839; 52°41′06″N 1°37′02″E		1152601	Upload Photo	Q26445509
Hall Farmhouse	II	Main Road			4 December 1987	TG4477416137; 52°41′15″N 1°37′13″E		1050992	Upload Photo	Q26302922

=== Somerton ===
Name	Grade	Location	Type	Completed	Date designated	Grid ref. Geo-coordinates	Notes	Entry number	Image	Wikidata
Church of St. Mary	II*	Church Road, West Somerton	church building		25 September 1962	TG4754919547; 52°43′01″N 1°39′50″E		1216608	Church of St. Mary More images	Q17554467
Burnley Hall	II*	East Somerton	house		20 February 1952	TG4787819756; 52°43′07″N 1°40′08″E		1216607	Burnley Hall More images	Q17554461
Garden Walls at Burnley Hall Including Icehouse	II	East Somerton			4 December 1987	TG4781319778; 52°43′08″N 1°40′05″E		1287572	Upload Photo	Q26576061
Ruins of Church of St Mary	II	East Somerton	architectural structure		25 September 1962	TG4808219721; 52°43′06″N 1°40′19″E		1228005	Ruins of Church of St Mary More images	Q26521881
Stables at Burnley Hall	II	East Somerton			20 February 1952	TG4792019724; 52°43′06″N 1°40′10″E		1287411	Upload Photo	Q26575914
West Somerton War Memorial	II	Junction Of Church Road And Winterton Road, West Somerton, NR29 4DR	war memorial		6 August 2019	TG4734319708; 52°43′06″N 1°39′39″E		1465461	West Somerton War Memorial More images	Q66672664
Heronfield	II	Sandy Lane, West Somerton			4 December 1987	TG4649519832; 52°43′12″N 1°38′55″E		1216609	Upload Photo	Q26511382
West Somerton Marsh Draining Pump	II	West Somerton			20 February 1952	TG4642420236; 52°43′25″N 1°38′52″E		1228023	Upload Photo	Q26521899

=== Stokesby with Herringby ===
Name	Grade	Location	Type	Completed	Date designated	Grid ref. Geo-coordinates	Notes	Entry number	Image	Wikidata
Commission Mill at Tg 42251041	II				4 December 1987	TG4225210451; 52°38′16″N 1°34′44″E		1152630	Upload Photo	Q26445535
Barn at Manor Farm	II				4 December 1987	TG4281010937; 52°38′30″N 1°35′15″E		1050994	Upload Photo	Q26302924
Commission Mill Cottage	II				4 December 1987	TG4220510461; 52°38′16″N 1°34′42″E		1050993	Upload Photo	Q26302923
Manor Farmhouse Including Attached Walled Garden	II				20 February 1952	TG4280210910; 52°38′30″N 1°35′15″E		1152671	Upload Photo	Q26445576
Tretts Mill	II				4 December 1987	TG4295810672; 52°38′22″N 1°35′22″E		1152700	Upload Photo	Q26445603
Barn 30m North-east of Ferry Inn	II	Ferry Lane			4 December 1987	TG4315810529; 52°38′17″N 1°35′32″E		1050995	Upload Photo	Q26302925
Martinstaithe and Staithe House	II	Ferry Lane			4 December 1987	TG4310110550; 52°38′17″N 1°35′29″E		1304629	Upload Photo	Q26591583
Stokesby with Herringby War Memorial	II	Filby Road, Stokesby, NR29 3ET	war memorial		18 June 2018	TG4357210563; 52°38′17″N 1°35′55″E		1456655	Stokesby with Herringby War Memorial More images	Q66479670
Barn 25m North-west of Stokesby Hall	II	Runham Road			4 March 1947	TG4397010168; 52°38′04″N 1°36′15″E		1372929	Upload Photo	Q26653974
Barn 50m East of Glebe Farmhouse	II	Runham Road			4 March 1947	TG4337110369; 52°38′11″N 1°35′43″E		1304625	Upload Photo	Q26591580
Barn 50m North of Stokesby Hall	II	Runham Road			4 March 1947	TG4400910215; 52°38′05″N 1°36′17″E		1304596	Upload Photo	Q26591557
Church of St. Andrew	II*	Runham Road, Stokesby	church building		25 September 1962	TG4359210568; 52°38′17″N 1°35′56″E		1152707	Church of St. Andrew More images	Q17554457
Glebe Farmhouse	II	Runham Road			20 February 1952	TG4331310373; 52°38′11″N 1°35′40″E		1050997	Upload Photo	Q26302927
Stokesby Hall	II	Runham Road			20 February 1952	TG4399410157; 52°38′03″N 1°36′16″E		1050998	Upload Photo	Q26302928
The Thatched House	II	The Green			4 December 1987	TG4309610643; 52°38′21″N 1°35′29″E		1050996	Upload Photo	Q26302926

=== Thurne ===
Name	Grade	Location	Type	Completed	Date designated	Grid ref. Geo-coordinates	Notes	Entry number	Image	Wikidata
Thurne Dyke Windpump at Tg 40031591	II*		architectural structure		7 December 1962	TG4005315918; 52°41′16″N 1°33′02″E		1050999	Thurne Dyke Windpump at Tg 40031591 More images	Q17554377
Church of St Edmund	II*	Church Road	church building		25 September 1962	TG4051015613; 52°41′05″N 1°33′25″E		1304567	Church of St Edmund More images	Q17554571
Thurne War Memorial	II	Church Road, NR29 3BT	war memorial		2 July 2018	TG4053415592; 52°41′04″N 1°33′26″E		1456089	Thurne War Memorial More images	Q66479632

=== West Caister ===
Name	Grade	Location	Type	Completed	Date designated	Grid ref. Geo-coordinates	Notes	Entry number	Image	Wikidata
Caister Hall	II*	Castle Lane			4 December 1987	TG5042012218; 52°38′59″N 1°42′03″E		1228031	Upload Photo	Q17554476
The Cannons	II	Front Road			4 December 1987	TG4990411382; 52°38′33″N 1°41′33″E		1216610	Upload Photo	Q26511383
Well House at the Cannons	II	Front Road			4 December 1987	TG4984811366; 52°38′33″N 1°41′30″E		1228033	Upload Photo	Q26521906
Caister Castle	I	Nr Great Yarmouth	castle		25 September 1962	TG5044012279; 52°39′01″N 1°42′04″E		1287573	Caister Castle More images	Q5017844
Church of St Edmund	II	West Road	church building		4 December 1987	TG5088211731; 52°38′43″N 1°42′26″E		1287574	Church of St Edmund More images	Q26576062
Ruins of Church St Edmund	II	West Road	church building		25 September 1962	TG5087311775; 52°38′44″N 1°42′25″E		1228046	Ruins of Church St Edmund More images	Q26521918

=== Winterton-on-Sea ===
Name	Grade	Location	Type	Completed	Date designated	Grid ref. Geo-coordinates	Notes	Entry number	Image	Wikidata
Church of Holy Trinity and All Saints	I	Black Street	church building		25 September 1962	TG4912219463; 52°42′56″N 1°41′13″E		1216611	Church of Holy Trinity and All Saints More images	Q17536013
Memorial to Clement Trotter Against South West Buttress of Porch of Church of Holy Trinity and All Saints	II	Black Street			4 December 1987	TG4911319447; 52°42′55″N 1°41′13″E		1228052	Upload Photo	Q26521924
Winterton-on-sea War Memorial	II	Black Street, NR29 4DB	war memorial		18 June 2018	TG4911619444; 52°42′55″N 1°41′13″E		1453989	Winterton-on-sea War Memorial More images	Q66479442

== See also ==
- Grade I listed buildings in Norfolk
- Grade II* listed buildings in Norfolk

== Sources ==
- Wilson, Bill; Pevsner, Nikolaus (1997) [1962], Norfolk 1: Norwich and North-East, The Buildings of England, New Haven and London: Yale University Press, ISBN 978-0-300-09607-1
