= Listed buildings in Norwich (within the city walls, eastern part) =

Norwich is city and non-civil parish in Norfolk , England. It contains 62 grade I, 126 grade II* and 855 grade II listed buildings that are recorded in the National Heritage List for England.

This list is based on the information retrieved online from Historic England.

The quantity of listed buildings in Norwich requires subdivision into geographically defined lists. This list includes all listed buildings located within the city walls, in the eastern part of the city, including Norwich Cathedral.

== Key ==
Grade	Criteria
I	Buildings that are of exceptional interest
II*	Particularly important buildings of more than special interest
II	Buildings that are of special interest

== Listing ==
Name	Grade	Location	Type	Completed (Note: The date given is the date used by Historic England as significant for the initial building or that of an important part in the structure's description.)	Date designated	Grid ref. (Note: The grid reference is based on the British national grid reference system, sometimes known as OSGB36, used by the Ordnance Survey.) Geo-coordinates	Notes	Entry number (Note: The "List Entry Number" is a unique number assigned to each listed building and scheduled monument by Historic England.)	Image	Wikidata
Anglia House	II	Agricultural Hall Plain			5 June 1972	TG2332008565; 52°37′44″N 1°17′54″E		1051422	Upload Photo	Q26303298
Royal Hotel	II	Agricultural Hall Plain			8 April 1986	TG2331608636; 52°37′46″N 1°17′54″E		1372725	Upload Photo	Q15273512
War Memorial	II	Agricultural Hall Plain			5 June 1972	TG2326608586; 52°37′45″N 1°17′51″E		1205081	Upload Photo	Q26500461
Hardwick House	II	2, Agricultural Hall Plain			23 October 1970	TG2335708571; 52°37′44″N 1°17′56″E		1280895	Upload Photo	Q26569985
Barclays Bank and Attached Area Railings	II	Bank Plain			8 April 1981	TG2325808633; 52°37′46″N 1°17′51″E		1205165	Upload Photo	Q26500537
5, Bank Plain	II	5, Bank Plain			8 April 1986	TG2324608696; 52°37′48″N 1°17′51″E		1051388	Upload Photo	Q26303265
14, Bank Street	II	14, Bank Street			8 April 1986	TG2332208666; 52°37′47″N 1°17′55″E		1051389	Upload Photo	Q26303266
Church of St John De Sepulchre	I	Ber Street			26 February 1954	TG2346407762; 52°37′18″N 1°18′00″E		1280767	Church of St John De Sepulchre	Q17537380
Remains of the Church of St Bartholomew	II	Ber Street			26 February 1954	TG2335007968; 52°37′25″N 1°17′54″E		1280799	Upload Photo	Q26569891
4, Ber Street	II	4, Ber Street			5 June 1972	TG2321108223; 52°37′33″N 1°17′48″E		1205196	Upload Photo	Q26500561
8, Ber Street	II	8, Ber Street			5 June 1972	TG2321508203; 52°37′32″N 1°17′48″E		1051393	Upload Photo	Q26303269
81 and 83, Ber Street	II	81 and 83, Ber Street			5 June 1972	TG2329608013; 52°37′26″N 1°17′52″E		1051396	Upload Photo	Q26303272
89 and 91, Ber Street	II	89 and 91, Ber Street			5 June 1972	TG2330807994; 52°37′26″N 1°17′52″E		1205309	Upload Photo	Q26500662
101, Ber Street	II	101, Ber Street			5 June 1972	TG2332107972; 52°37′25″N 1°17′53″E		1051397	Upload Photo	Q26303273
103, Ber Street	II	103, Ber Street			5 June 1972	TG2333007962; 52°37′24″N 1°17′53″E		1205317	Upload Photo	Q26500670
121 and 123, Ber Street	II	121 and 123, Ber Street			5 June 1972	TG2334507929; 52°37′23″N 1°17′54″E		1051398	Upload Photo	Q26303274
Jolly Butchers	II	125, Ber Street			5 June 1972	TG2335407918; 52°37′23″N 1°17′54″E		1205327	Upload Photo	Q26500680
139, Ber Street	II	139, Ber Street			5 June 1972	TG2337607879; 52°37′22″N 1°17′55″E		1372713	Upload Photo	Q26653797
156, Ber Street	II	156, Ber Street			26 February 1954	TG2348707782; 52°37′18″N 1°18′01″E		1051394	Upload Photo	Q26303270
Ber House	II	158 and 158a, Ber Street			26 February 1954	TG2349707775; 52°37′18″N 1°18′02″E		1280804	Upload Photo	Q26569896
Ber Cottage	II	160, Ber Street			26 February 1954	TG2350807764; 52°37′18″N 1°18′02″E		1051395	Upload Photo	Q26303271
Birkbeck Hall at the Great Hospital	II	Bishopgate			26 February 1954	TG2371009066; 52°38′00″N 1°18′16″E		1051369	Upload Photo	Q26303249
Bishop Bridge	II*	Bishopgate			26 February 1954	TG2399308991; 52°37′57″N 1°18′31″E		1205642	Upload Photo	Q17557255
Boundary Wall to St Helen's House	II	Bishopgate			5 June 1972	TG2360909092; 52°38′01″N 1°18′11″E		1372738	Upload Photo	Q26653815
Church of St Helen	I	Bishopgate			26 February 1954	TG2373309020; 52°37′58″N 1°18′17″E		1051367	Church of St Helen	Q17537257
Cloisters Including West Wall of Former Chapter House (?) at the Great Hospital	I	Bishopgate			26 February 1954	TG2373309041; 52°37′59″N 1°18′17″E		1280660	Cloisters Including West Wall of Former Chapter House (?) at the Great Hospital	Q17537378
East Wards at the Great Hospital	II	Bishopgate			5 June 1972	TG2379609056; 52°37′59″N 1°18′21″E		1372741	East Wards at the Great Hospital	Q26653817
Forecourt Railings, Gates And Gatepieces At The Great Hospital	II	Bishopgate			8 April 1986	TG2368509004; 52°37′58″N 1°18′15″E		1205589	Upload Photo	Q26500917
Former Chaplain's House at the Great Hospital	I	Bishopgate			26 February 1954	TG2368009063; 52°37′59″N 1°18′14″E		1205562	Upload Photo	Q17537326
Part of the Former Master's House at the Great Hospital	I	Bishopgate			26 February 1954	TG2372809049; 52°37′59″N 1°18′17″E		1205544	Part of the Former Master's House at the Great Hospital	Q17537321
Part of the Former Master's House at the Great Hospital	I	Bishopgate			26 February 1954	TG2371009053; 52°37′59″N 1°18′16″E		1051368	Upload Photo	Q17537262
Precinct Wall	II*	Bishopgate			5 June 1972	TG2343109027; 52°37′59″N 1°18′01″E		1051331	Upload Photo	Q17557112
Refectory and Part of Former Master's House at the Great Hospital	I	Bishopgate			26 February 1954	TG2371109035; 52°37′59″N 1°18′16″E		1372739	Upload Photo	Q66625218
St Helen's House	II*	Bishopgate			5 June 1972	TG2366309052; 52°37′59″N 1°18′14″E		1051366	Upload Photo	Q17557147
Statue of Meleager in Grounds of St Helen's House	II	Bishopgate			5 June 1972	TG2362009103; 52°38′01″N 1°18′11″E		1205491	Upload Photo	Q26500830
The Lodge at the Great Hospital	II	Bishopgate			26 February 1954	TG2370109005; 52°37′58″N 1°18′15″E		1372740	Upload Photo	Q26653816
The Swan Pit and Sluice the Great Hospital	II	Bishopsgate			12 June 2002	TG2376409154; 52°38′02″N 1°18′19″E		1360781	Upload Photo	Q26642838
Wall and Gate Piers to West of White Cottages at the Great Hospital	II	Bishopgate			5 June 1972	TG2376109054; 52°37′59″N 1°18′19″E		1280625	Upload Photo	Q26569737
White Cottages at the Great Hospital	II	Bishopgate			5 June 1972	TG2376909055; 52°37′59″N 1°18′19″E		1051370	Upload Photo	Q26303250
17, Bishopgate	II	17, Bishopgate			5 June 1972	TG2362009131; 52°38′02″N 1°18′11″E		1372737	Upload Photo	Q15734109
52 and 54, Bishopgate	II*	52 and 54, Bishopgate			5 June 1972	TG2387708984; 52°37′57″N 1°18′25″E		1205621	Upload Photo	Q17557250
70, Bishopgate	II	70, Bishopgate			5 June 1972	TG2396508970; 52°37′56″N 1°18′29″E		1051371	Upload Photo	Q26303251
Carrow Hill Hostel	II	2 and 4, Carrow Hill			5 June 1972	TG2372307639; 52°37′13″N 1°18′13″E		1205994	Upload Photo	Q26501261
24, Cattle Market Street	II	24, Cattle Market Street			5 June 1972	TG2332008383; 52°37′38″N 1°17′54″E		1206067	Upload Photo	Q26501328
The Market Tavern	II	Crown Road			8 April 1986	TG2337808493; 52°37′42″N 1°17′57″E		1051293	Upload Photo	Q26303200
35, Crown Road	II	35, Crown Road			5 June 1972	TG2337008511; 52°37′42″N 1°17′57″E		1051292	Upload Photo	Q26303199
36-38, Crown Road	II	36-38, Crown Road			5 June 1972	TG2337008502; 52°37′42″N 1°17′57″E		1280182	Upload Photo	Q26569347
Church of St Simon and St Jude	I	Elm Hill			5 June 1972	TG2325408916; 52°37′55″N 1°17′52″E		1051274	Upload Photo	Q17537237
2 and 4, Elm Hill	II	2 and 4, Elm Hill			26 February 1954	TG2318408790; 52°37′51″N 1°17′47″E		1051909	Upload Photo	Q26303727
6 and 8, Elm Hill	II	6 and 8, Elm Hill			5 June 1972	TG2318508802; 52°37′52″N 1°17′48″E		1051266	Upload Photo	Q26303177
The Briton's Arms	II*	9, Elm Hill			26 February 1954	TG2319308827; 52°37′53″N 1°17′48″E		1372804	Upload Photo	Q17531356
11 and 13, Elm Hill	II*	11 and 13, Elm Hill			8 April 1986	TG2320608829; 52°37′53″N 1°17′49″E		1298580	Upload Photo	Q17531078
12-16, Elm Hill	II	12-16, Elm Hill			26 February 1954	TG2318808843; 52°37′53″N 1°17′48″E		1206643	Upload Photo	Q26501842
18, Elm Hill	II	18, Elm Hill			26 February 1954	TG2319408854; 52°37′53″N 1°17′48″E		1051267	Upload Photo	Q26303178
20, Elm Hill	II	20, Elm Hill			26 February 1954	TG2319808861; 52°37′54″N 1°17′48″E		1206646	Upload Photo	Q26501845
21-27, Elm Hill	II	21-27, Elm Hill			26 February 1954	TG2321108851; 52°37′53″N 1°17′49″E		1051272	Upload Photo	Q26303183
Strangers Club	II*	22 and 24, Elm Hill			26 February 1954	TG2320708876; 52°37′54″N 1°17′49″E		1051268	Upload Photo	Q26303180
28 and 30, Elm Hill	II*	28 and 30, Elm Hill			26 February 1954	TG2321508890; 52°37′55″N 1°17′49″E		1206720	Upload Photo	Q17530842
29 and 29a, Elm Hill	II	29 and 29a, Elm Hill			5 June 1972	TG2321308861; 52°37′54″N 1°17′49″E		1025234	Upload Photo	Q26275962
30b, Elm Hill	II	30b, Elm Hill			8 April 1986	TG2322008902; 52°37′55″N 1°17′50″E		1051269	Upload Photo	Q26303181
31-35, Elm Hill	II	31-35, Elm Hill			5 June 1972	TG2321908872; 52°37′54″N 1°17′50″E		1051273	Upload Photo	Q26303184
32, Elm Hill	II	32, Elm Hill			26 February 1954	TG2322008911; 52°37′55″N 1°17′50″E		1187698	Upload Photo	Q26482881
34 and 36, Elm Hill	II*	34 and 36, Elm Hill			26 February 1954	TG2323108924; 52°37′56″N 1°17′50″E		1051270	Upload Photo	Q17557048
37 and 39, Elm Hill	II	37 and 39, Elm Hill			5 June 1972	TG2322408880; 52°37′54″N 1°17′50″E		1355131	Upload Photo	Q26638011
38, Elm Hill	II	38, Elm Hill			5 June 1972	TG2324108934; 52°37′56″N 1°17′51″E		1051271	Upload Photo	Q26303182
40, Elm Hill	II	40, Elm Hill			5 June 1972	TG2324908942; 52°37′56″N 1°17′51″E		1187706	Upload Photo	Q26482889
41 and 43, Elm Hill	II*	41 and 43, Elm Hill			26 February 1954	TG2322908891; 52°37′55″N 1°17′50″E		1372805	Upload Photo	Q17531371
45-47, Elm Hill	II	45-47, Elm Hill			5 June 1972	TG2323408902; 52°37′55″N 1°17′50″E		1025121	Upload Photo	Q26275930
18, Golden Ball Street	II	18, Golden Ball Street			5 June 1972	TG2321808288; 52°37′35″N 1°17′48″E		1051249	Upload Photo	Q26303160
Building to the Rear of Number 68	II	King Street			8 April 1986	TG2339008412; 52°37′39″N 1°17′58″E		1051241	Upload Photo	Q26303154
Church of St Etheldreda	I	King Street			26 February 1954	TG2364107933; 52°37′23″N 1°18′10″E		1051209	Upload Photo	Q17537223
Church of St Peter Parmentergate	I	King Street			26 February 1954	TG2339108373; 52°37′38″N 1°17′57″E		1372808	Upload Photo	Q17537412
City Flour Mills	II	King Street			5 June 1972	TG2380007790; 52°37′18″N 1°18′18″E		1217918	Upload Photo	Q26512605
Letterbox Set in Wall South of Howard's House	II	King Street			5 June 1972	TG2346608299; 52°37′35″N 1°18′01″E		1217874	Upload Photo	Q26512566
Remains of St Peter Southgate Church	II	King Street			26 February 1954	TG2376107750; 52°37′17″N 1°18′16″E		1051210	Upload Photo	Q26303126
Nags Head	II	27 and 29, King Street			5 June 1972	TG2338908555; 52°37′44″N 1°17′58″E		1051233	Upload Photo	Q26303149
32, King Street	II	32, King Street			5 June 1972	TG2337608538; 52°37′43″N 1°17′57″E		1051239	Upload Photo	Q26303153
43, King Street	II	43, King Street			5 June 1972	TG2340408466; 52°37′41″N 1°17′58″E		1217839	Upload Photo	Q26512536
45, King Street	II	45, King Street			5 June 1972	TG2340508457; 52°37′40″N 1°17′58″E		1051234	Upload Photo	Q26303150
56-60, King Street	II*	56-60, King Street			26 February 1954	TG2339208451; 52°37′40″N 1°17′58″E		1051240	Upload Photo	Q17557033
62, 62a and 64, King Street	II	62, 62a and 64, King Street			5 June 1972	TG2339508436; 52°37′40″N 1°17′58″E		1218212	Upload Photo	Q26512866
66, King Street	II	66, King Street			5 June 1972	TG2339308426; 52°37′39″N 1°17′58″E		1372789	Upload Photo	Q26653850
68, King Street	II	68, King Street			5 June 1972	TG2340108416; 52°37′39″N 1°17′58″E		1292081	Upload Photo	Q26580131
70, King Street	II	70, King Street			5 June 1972	TG2340408406; 52°37′39″N 1°17′58″E		1218230	Upload Photo	Q26512881
79, King Street	II	79, King Street			26 February 1954	TG2343708365; 52°37′37″N 1°18′00″E		1292247	Upload Photo	Q26580279
81 and 83, King Street	II	81 and 83, King Street			5 June 1972	TG2343908356; 52°37′37″N 1°18′00″E		1372823	Upload Photo	Q26653877
82 and 84, King Street	II	82 and 84, King Street			8 April 1986	TG2343108331; 52°37′36″N 1°17′59″E		1051203	Upload Photo	Q26303122
86-90, King Street	II	86-90, King Street			26 February 1954	TG2343808321; 52°37′36″N 1°18′00″E		1051204	Upload Photo	Q26303123
87 and 89, King Street	II	87 and 89, King Street			5 June 1972	TG2344608341; 52°37′37″N 1°18′00″E		1217859	Upload Photo	Q26512554
91, King Street	II*	91, King Street			5 June 1972	TG2345008336; 52°37′36″N 1°18′01″E		1051235	Upload Photo	Q17557028
Howard's House	II*	97, King Street			26 February 1954	TG2346808307; 52°37′35″N 1°18′01″E		1372824	Upload Photo	Q17531395
The Old Barge	I	115-123, King Street			26 February 1954	TG2354908184; 52°37′31″N 1°18′05″E		1051236	Upload Photo	Q5305211
125, 125a and 127, King Street	II*	125, 125a and 127, King Street			26 February 1954	TG2357308161; 52°37′31″N 1°18′07″E		1217899	Upload Photo	Q17530913
129, King Street	II	129, King Street			8 April 1986	TG2357908151; 52°37′30″N 1°18′07″E		1051237	Upload Photo	Q26303151
Music House	I	167 and 169, King Street			26 February 1954	TG2362808041; 52°37′27″N 1°18′09″E		1217907	Upload Photo	Q17537363
168, King Street	II*	168, King Street			26 February 1954	TG2360908034; 52°37′26″N 1°18′08″E		1051205	Upload Photo	Q17557014
170 and 172, King Street	II*	170 and 172, King Street			26 February 1954	TG2361808020; 52°37′26″N 1°18′09″E		1051206	Upload Photo	Q17557019
174, King Street	II	174, King Street			26 February 1954	TG2362108013; 52°37′26″N 1°18′09″E		1051207	Upload Photo	Q26303124
178 and 180, King Street	II	178 and 180, King Street			26 February 1954	TG2362508005; 52°37′25″N 1°18′09″E		1051208	Upload Photo	Q26303125
182, King Street	II	182, King Street			26 February 1954	TG2363007997; 52°37′25″N 1°18′09″E		1372809	Upload Photo	Q26653865
The Ferry Boat Inn	II	191, King Street			5 June 1972	TG2369907899; 52°37′22″N 1°18′13″E		1372825	Upload Photo	Q7733687
213, King Street	II	213, King Street			5 June 1972	TG2373507850; 52°37′20″N 1°18′14″E		1292239	Upload Photo	Q26580271
237, King Street	II	237, King Street			5 June 1972	TG2379007800; 52°37′19″N 1°18′17″E		1051238	Upload Photo	Q26303152
1-5, Mandell's Court	II	1-5, Mandell's Court			26 February 1954	TG2322508819; 52°37′52″N 1°17′50″E		1372464	Upload Photo	Q26653584
The Monastery	II	1, The Monastery			5 June 1972	TG2317808848; 52°37′53″N 1°17′47″E		1372846	Upload Photo	Q26653898
Building Fronting Mountergate and East of St Faith's House	II	Mountergate			5 June 1972	TG2362208416; 52°37′39″N 1°18′10″E		1372447	Upload Photo	Q26653569
St Faith's House	II	Mountergate			26 February 1954	TG2364608416; 52°37′39″N 1°18′11″E		1291580	Upload Photo	Q26579681
1, 3 and 5, Palace Street	II	1, 3 and 5, Palace Street			26 February 1954	TG2333508925; 52°37′56″N 1°17′56″E		1219661	Upload Photo	Q26514192
15, Palace Street	II	15, Palace Street			26 February 1954	TG2335808966; 52°37′57″N 1°17′57″E		1372476	Upload Photo	Q26653594
17, Palace Street	II	17, Palace Street			26 February 1954	TG2336608975; 52°37′57″N 1°17′58″E		1051935	Upload Photo	Q26303749
Foundry Bridge	II	Prince Of Wales Road			5 June 1972	TG2382208481; 52°37′40″N 1°18′21″E		1051908	Upload Photo	Q26303726
Former Railway Mission	II	79, Prince Of Wales Road			6 January 2011	TG2362908552; 52°37′43″N 1°18′11″E		1396398	Upload Photo	Q26675186
United Reformed Church	II	Princes Street			5 June 1972	TG2321908768; 52°37′51″N 1°17′49″E		1220190	Upload Photo	Q26514683
St Peter Hungate Museum	I	Princes Street			26 February 1954	TG2321008803; 52°37′52″N 1°17′49″E		1220104	Upload Photo	Q17537366
Garsett House	II	1, Princes Street			26 February 1954	TG2315408754; 52°37′50″N 1°17′46″E		1291129	Upload Photo	Q26579271
2, Princes Street	II	2, Princes Street			5 June 1972	TG2317108781; 52°37′51″N 1°17′47″E		1291156	Upload Photo	Q26579295
3 and 5, Princes Street	II	3 and 5, Princes Street			26 February 1954	TG2317108763; 52°37′51″N 1°17′47″E		1372466	Upload Photo	Q26653586
7, Princes Street	II*	7, Princes Street			26 February 1954	TG2317908766; 52°37′51″N 1°17′47″E		1220186	Upload Photo	Q17530938
9, Princes Street	II*	9, Princes Street			26 February 1954	TG2318608768; 52°37′51″N 1°17′48″E		1051913	Upload Photo	Q17557216
10 and 12, Princes Street	II	10 and 12, Princes Street			5 June 1972	TG2324108815; 52°37′52″N 1°17′51″E		1291145	Upload Photo	Q26579285
14, Princes Street	II	14, Princes Street			26 February 1954	TG2325008819; 52°37′52″N 1°17′51″E		1051910	Upload Photo	Q26303728
16 and 18, Princes Street	II	16 and 18, Princes Street			26 February 1954	TG2326308824; 52°37′52″N 1°17′52″E		1220123	Upload Photo	Q26514618
19, Princes Street	II	19, Princes Street			26 February 1954	TG2329808809; 52°37′52″N 1°17′54″E		1051914	Upload Photo	Q26303730
20, Princes Street	II*	20, Princes Street			26 February 1954	TG2327508829; 52°37′53″N 1°17′52″E		1051911	Upload Photo	Q17557211
22, Princes Street	II	22, Princes Street			26 February 1954	TG2328208827; 52°37′52″N 1°17′53″E		1372465	Upload Photo	Q26653585
24, Princes Street	II	24, Princes Street			26 February 1954	TG2328708827; 52°37′52″N 1°17′53″E		1220156	Upload Photo	Q26514650
26, Princes Street	II	26, Princes Street			26 February 1954	TG2329208828; 52°37′52″N 1°17′53″E		1051912	Upload Photo	Q26303729
5, Quayside	II	5, Quayside			5 June 1972	TG2326909003; 52°37′58″N 1°17′53″E		1220213	Upload Photo	Q26514703
8 and 9, Quayside	II	8 and 9, Quayside			4 May 1971	TG2329409011; 52°37′58″N 1°17′54″E		1372467	Upload Photo	Q26653587
10, Quayside	II	10, Quayside			5 June 1972	TG2330209015; 52°37′59″N 1°17′54″E		1051915	Upload Photo	Q26303731
Church of St Mary the Less	I	Queen Street			26 February 1954	TG2331008750; 52°37′50″N 1°17′54″E		1051918	Upload Photo	Q17537307
Old Bank of England Court (left Hand Side)	II	Queen Street			5 June 1972	TG2327408734; 52°37′49″N 1°17′52″E		1291064	Upload Photo	Q26579213
Old Bank of England Court (right Hand Side)	II	Queen Street			5 June 1972	TG2328608737; 52°37′50″N 1°17′53″E		1372470	Upload Photo	Q26653590
1 Queen Street, Norwich	II	1, Queen Street, NR2 4SG			5 June 1972	TG2325908698; 52°37′48″N 1°17′51″E		1051919	Upload Photo	Q26303735
3, Queen Street	II*	3, Queen Street, NR2 4SG			5 June 1972	TG2328008701; 52°37′48″N 1°17′52″E		1291066	Upload Photo	Q17531064
Gateway to James Stuart Gardens	II	Recorder Road			5 June 1972	TG2368608649; 52°37′46″N 1°18′14″E		1372488	Upload Photo	Q26653604
Stuart Court	II	Recorder Road			5 June 1972	TG2376608679; 52°37′47″N 1°18′18″E		1051879	Upload Photo	Q26303703
Greek Orthodox Church Including Walls, Gate-piers And Gates Adjoining South East And North East	II	3, Recorder Road, NR1 1NR			6 December 1991	TG2378508577; 52°37′44″N 1°18′19″E		1319720	Upload Photo	Q26605789
Church of St Michael at Plea	I	Redwell Street			26 February 1954	TG2323508742; 52°37′50″N 1°17′50″E		1051880	Upload Photo	Q17537292
2, Redwell Street	II*	2, Redwell Street			8 April 1986	TG2321208702; 52°37′49″N 1°17′49″E		1051881	Upload Photo	Q17557203
8, Redwell Street	II	8, Redwell Street			5 June 1972	TG2318608747; 52°37′50″N 1°17′47″E		1372489	Upload Photo	Q26653605
5, Rose Lane	II	5, Rose Lane			5 June 1972	TG2342208476; 52°37′41″N 1°17′59″E		1051887	Upload Photo	Q26303709
Tudor Hall	II	19, Rose Lane			30 August 1996	TG2345608494; 52°37′41″N 1°18′01″E		1268296	Upload Photo	Q26558616
Prospect House	II	Rouen Road, NR1 1RE			10 September 2018	TG2327308286; 52°37′35″N 1°17′51″E		1457931	Upload Photo	Q66479785
7, St Faith's Lane	II*	7, St Faith's Lane			5 June 1972	TG2360408743; 52°37′49″N 1°18′10″E		1220856	Upload Photo	Q17530948
Church of St Julian	I	St Julian's Alley			26 February 1954	TG2349508124; 52°37′29″N 1°18′02″E		1051852	Upload Photo	Q5117463
Church of St Martin at Palace	I	St Martin At Palace Plain			26 February 1954	TG2347709108; 52°38′01″N 1°18′04″E		1372511	Upload Photo	Q17537390
St Martin's Vicarage	II	St Martin At Palace Plain			5 June 1972	TG2350909089; 52°38′01″N 1°18′05″E		1210447	Upload Photo	Q26505497
1 and 2, St Martin at Palace Plain	II	1 and 2, St Martin At Palace Plain			26 February 1954	TG2341709039; 52°37′59″N 1°18′00″E		1051853	Upload Photo	Q26303680
The Wig and Pen	II	6, St Martin At Palace Plain, NR3 1RN			5 June 1972	TG2340909066; 52°38′00″N 1°18′00″E		1210450	Upload Photo	Q26505500
Cotman House	II*	7, St Martin At Palace Plain			26 February 1954	TG2341809076; 52°38′00″N 1°18′01″E		1051854	Upload Photo	Q17557199
8, St Martin at Palace Plain	II	8, St Martin At Palace Plain			26 February 1954	TG2342309083; 52°38′01″N 1°18′01″E		1372512	Upload Photo	Q26653625
9, St Martin at Palace Plain	II	9, St Martin At Palace Plain			26 February 1954	TG2342709094; 52°38′01″N 1°18′01″E		1290467	Upload Photo	Q26578671
10, St Martin at Palace Plain	II	10, St Martin At Palace Plain			17 August 1970	TG2343209098; 52°38′01″N 1°18′01″E		1051855	Upload Photo	Q26303681
The Deanery, Priors Hall And Adjoining Boundary Wall To South West	I	The Close			26 February 1954	TG2353908849; 52°37′53″N 1°18′06″E		1206422	Upload Photo	Q17537335
Bishop Renold's Chapel	II*	The Close			26 February 1954	TG2349208987; 52°37′57″N 1°18′04″E		1206255	Upload Photo	Q17557260
Bishop Salmon's Porch	II*	The Close			26 February 1954	TG2350109018; 52°37′58″N 1°18′05″E		1051329	Upload Photo	Q17557107
Bishop's Gate	I	The Close			5 June 1972	TG2349809057; 52°38′00″N 1°18′05″E		1051328	Upload Photo	Q17537253
Bishop's Palace	I	The Close			26 February 1954	TG2345808967; 52°37′57″N 1°18′02″E		1372759	Upload Photo	Q17537405
Building East of and Adjoining the Bishop's Gate	II	The Close			5 June 1972	TG2352209070; 52°38′00″N 1°18′06″E		1280308	Upload Photo	Q26569458
Carnary Chapel	I	The Close			26 February 1954	TG2338208898; 52°37′55″N 1°17′58″E		1051315	Upload Photo	Q17537248
Cavell Memorial 2 Metres East of South Transept of Cathedral of the Holy and Undivided Trinity	II	The Close			5 June 1972	TG2354508916; 52°37′55″N 1°18′07″E		1206280	Upload Photo	Q26501521
Erpingham Gate	I	The Close			5 June 1972	TG2335608875; 52°37′54″N 1°17′57″E		1372788	Upload Photo	Q17647873
Garden Wall and Gate Piers in Front of Number 6	II	The Close			5 June 1972	TG2346608760; 52°37′50″N 1°18′02″E		1280245	Upload Photo	Q26569402
Range of Stabling West of Number 25	II	The Close			5 June 1972	TG2380408776; 52°37′50″N 1°18′20″E		1051340	Upload Photo	Q26303225
Remains of Monastic Infirmary	II*	The Close			5 June 1972	TG2351008812; 52°37′52″N 1°18′05″E		1051313	Upload Photo	Q17557100
St Ethelbert's Gate	I	The Close			26 February 1954	TG2340008762; 52°37′50″N 1°17′59″E		1206324	Upload Photo	Q17537330
Statue of Lord Nelson	II	The Close			5 June 1972	TG2339508858; 52°37′53″N 1°17′59″E		1051332	Upload Photo	Q26303222
Statue of the Duke of Wellington	II	The Close			5 June 1972	TG2342708781; 52°37′51″N 1°18′00″E		1206314	Upload Photo	Q26501553
The Cathedral of the Holy and Undivided Trinity	I	The Close			26 February 1954	TG2347608911; 52°37′55″N 1°18′03″E		1051330	Upload Photo	Q768692
Water Gate	II*	The Close			26 February 1954	TG2389708758; 52°37′49″N 1°18′25″E		1206380	Upload Photo	Q17557285
1, The Close	II*	1, The Close			26 February 1954	TG2339908751; 52°37′50″N 1°17′59″E		1051333	Upload Photo	Q17557117
2, The Close	II*	2, The Close			26 February 1954	TG2340708736; 52°37′49″N 1°17′59″E		1206337	Upload Photo	Q17557268
3 and 4, The Close	II*	3 and 4, The Close			26 February 1954	TG2343608716; 52°37′49″N 1°18′01″E		1051334	Upload Photo	Q17557122
5, The Close	II*	5, The Close			26 February 1954	TG2344808721; 52°37′49″N 1°18′01″E		1206349	Upload Photo	Q17557274
6, The Close	II*	6, The Close			26 February 1954	TG2347308734; 52°37′49″N 1°18′03″E		1051335	Upload Photo	Q17557128
7, The Close	II*	7, The Close			26 February 1954	TG2354108768; 52°37′50″N 1°18′06″E		1051336	Upload Photo	Q17557133
8 and 9, The Close	II*	8 and 9, The Close			26 February 1954	TG2356208771; 52°37′50″N 1°18′08″E		1372760	Upload Photo	Q17531186
10-12, The Close	II*	10-12, The Close			26 February 1954	TG2358608772; 52°37′50″N 1°18′09″E		1280248	Upload Photo	Q17531006
14a, The Close	II*	14a, The Close			5 June 1972	TG2362508742; 52°37′49″N 1°18′11″E		1051337	Upload Photo	Q17557138
16, The Close	II*	16, The Close			26 February 1954	TG2367008752; 52°37′49″N 1°18′13″E		1206365	Upload Photo	Q17557278
17, The Close	II*	17, The Close			5 June 1972	TG2365808770; 52°37′50″N 1°18′13″E		1372761	Upload Photo	Q17531196
18, The Close	II*	18, The Close			5 June 1972	TG2367008770; 52°37′50″N 1°18′13″E		1206370	Upload Photo	Q17557283
20, The Close	II	20, The Close			5 June 1972	TG2370008761; 52°37′50″N 1°18′15″E		1051338	Upload Photo	Q26303223
22, The Close	II	22, The Close			5 June 1972	TG2381608758; 52°37′49″N 1°18′21″E		1280253	Upload Photo	Q26569409
23, The Close	II	23, The Close			5 June 1972	TG2383208757; 52°37′49″N 1°18′22″E		1051339	Upload Photo	Q26303224
24, The Close	II	24, The Close			5 June 1972	TG2384508755; 52°37′49″N 1°18′22″E		1280256	Upload Photo	Q26569412
25, The Close	II*	25, The Close			26 February 1954	TG2389308748; 52°37′49″N 1°18′25″E		1372762	Upload Photo	Q17531208
26, The Close	II*	26, The Close			26 February 1954	TG2372508781; 52°37′50″N 1°18′16″E		1372763	Upload Photo	Q17531219
27, The Close	II*	27, The Close			26 February 1954	TG2371408790; 52°37′51″N 1°18′16″E		1206385	Upload Photo	Q17557289
28, The Close	II*	28, The Close			26 February 1954	TG2370708790; 52°37′51″N 1°18′15″E		1051341	Upload Photo	Q17557142
29, The Close	II*	29, The Close			5 June 1972	TG2368408785; 52°37′51″N 1°18′14″E		1206389	Upload Photo	Q17557293
30, The Close	II*	30, The Close			26 February 1954	TG2366908793; 52°37′51″N 1°18′13″E		1051301	Upload Photo	Q17557056
31, The Close	II*	31, The Close			26 February 1954	TG2365308804; 52°37′51″N 1°18′12″E		1372782	Upload Photo	Q17531246
32 and 33, The Close	II*	32 and 33, The Close			26 February 1954	TG2364008802; 52°37′51″N 1°18′12″E		1051302	Upload Photo	Q17557060
34, The Close	II*	34, The Close			26 February 1954	TG2364008824; 52°37′52″N 1°18′12″E		1372783	Upload Photo	Q17531256
35a, 35b and 35c, The Close	II*	35a, 35b and 35c, The Close			5 June 1972	TG2367408854; 52°37′53″N 1°18′14″E		1051303	Upload Photo	Q17557064
36, The Close	II*	36, The Close			5 June 1972	TG2368008860; 52°37′53″N 1°18′14″E		1051304	Upload Photo	Q17557068
37 and 38, The Close	II*	37 and 38, The Close			5 June 1972	TG2369208863; 52°37′53″N 1°18′15″E		1372784	Upload Photo	Q17531267
39, The Close	II*	39, The Close			5 June 1972	TG2369908864; 52°37′53″N 1°18′15″E		1051305	Upload Photo	Q17557073
40, The Close	II*	40, The Close			26 February 1954	TG2370508877; 52°37′53″N 1°18′15″E		1372785	Upload Photo	Q17531293
41, The Close	II*	41, The Close			5 June 1972	TG2369508875; 52°37′53″N 1°18′15″E		1051306	Upload Photo	Q17557077
43 and 44, The Close	II*	43 and 44, The Close			26 February 1954	TG2366708981; 52°37′57″N 1°18′14″E		1051307	Upload Photo	Q17557081
45, The Close	II*	45, The Close			5 June 1972	TG2368008889; 52°37′54″N 1°18′14″E		1206406	Upload Photo	Q17557297
46, The Close	II*	46, The Close			26 February 1954	TG2367908872; 52°37′53″N 1°18′14″E		1372786	Upload Photo	Q17531306
48, The Close	II*	48, The Close			26 February 1954	TG2367008868; 52°37′53″N 1°18′13″E		1280233	Upload Photo	Q17530994
49, The Close	II*	49, The Close			26 February 1954	TG2366108863; 52°37′53″N 1°18′13″E		1051308	Upload Photo	Q17557086
50, The Close	II*	50, The Close			26 February 1954	TG2364808856; 52°37′53″N 1°18′12″E		1206417	Upload Photo	Q17557300
51-55, The Close	II*	51-55, The Close			26 February 1954	TG2360508847; 52°37′53″N 1°18′10″E		1051309	Upload Photo	Q17557089
56, The Close	II*	56, The Close			26 February 1954	TG2357708846; 52°37′53″N 1°18′08″E		1051310	Upload Photo	Q17557096
57, The Close	II	57, The Close			5 June 1972	TG2359008919; 52°37′55″N 1°18′09″E		1051311	Upload Photo	Q26303208
58, The Close	II	58, The Close			26 February 1954	TG2359108961; 52°37′56″N 1°18′10″E		1280241	Upload Photo	Q26569398
59, The Close	II	59, The Close			26 February 1954	TG2358808965; 52°37′56″N 1°18′09″E		1051312	Upload Photo	Q26303209
60, 60a and 60b, The Close	II	60, 60a and 60b, The Close			26 February 1954	TG2358408976; 52°37′57″N 1°18′09″E		1280242	Upload Photo	Q26569399
64, The Close	II	64, The Close			5 June 1972	TG2350208794; 52°37′51″N 1°18′04″E		1206428	Upload Photo	Q26501646
65, The Close	II*	65, The Close			5 June 1972	TG2348508794; 52°37′51″N 1°18′03″E		1372787	Upload Photo	Q17531318
67a, 67b, 67c and 68, The Close	II*	67a, 67b, 67c and 68, The Close			26 February 1954	TG2344608801; 52°37′51″N 1°18′01″E		1206435	Upload Photo	Q17557305
69, The Close	I	69, The Close			5 June 1972	TG2339408906; 52°37′55″N 1°17′59″E		1051314	Upload Photo	Q66625167
70, The Close	I	70, The Close			26 February 1954	TG2336008891; 52°37′54″N 1°17′57″E		1206438	Upload Photo	Q17537341
71, The Close	II*	71, The Close			5 June 1972	TG2336608858; 52°37′53″N 1°17′57″E		1280207	Upload Photo	Q17530970
72, The Close	II	72, The Close			5 June 1972	TG2338408814; 52°37′52″N 1°17′58″E		1051316	Upload Photo	Q26303210
73, The Close	II*	73, The Close			5 June 1972	TG2338708806; 52°37′52″N 1°17′58″E		1280208	Upload Photo	Q17530982
74, The Close	II	74, The Close			26 February 1954	TG2339408791; 52°37′51″N 1°17′59″E		1372751	Upload Photo	Q26653827
75, The Close	II	75, The Close			26 February 1954	TG2340208773; 52°37′51″N 1°17′59″E		1280209	Upload Photo	Q26569371
Cathedral Chambers	II	Tombland			5 June 1972	TG2331808769; 52°37′51″N 1°17′55″E		1210703	Upload Photo	Q26505748
Church of St George	I	Tombland			26 February 1954	TG2331008835; 52°37′53″N 1°17′54″E		1051809	Upload Photo	Q17537270
Edith Cavell Memorial	II*	Tombland			5 June 1972	TG2335608858; 52°37′53″N 1°17′57″E		1210795	Upload Photo	Q26268193
Maid's Head Hotel	II	Tombland			26 February 1954	TG2331008926; 52°37′56″N 1°17′55″E		1051811	Upload Photo	Q6735473
Pair of K6 Telephone Kiosks	II	Tombland			13 August 1990	TG2335308778; 52°37′51″N 1°17′56″E		1372542	Upload Photo	Q26653652
2, Tombland	II	2, Tombland			5 June 1972	TG2331908764; 52°37′50″N 1°17′55″E		1051807	Upload Photo	Q26303644
3, Tombland	II	3, Tombland			5 June 1972	TG2331608779; 52°37′51″N 1°17′54″E		1372525	Upload Photo	Q26653636
4, Tombland	II*	4, Tombland			26 February 1954	TG2331308784; 52°37′51″N 1°17′54″E		1290353	Upload Photo	Q17531029
5 and 5a, Tombland	II*	5 and 5a, Tombland			26 February 1954	TG2330908795; 52°37′51″N 1°17′54″E		1051808	Upload Photo	Q17557181
6, Tombland	II	6, Tombland			26 February 1954	TG2330508807; 52°37′52″N 1°17′54″E		1210719	Upload Photo	Q26505765
8, Tombland	II*	8, Tombland			5 June 1972	TG2333208825; 52°37′52″N 1°17′55″E		1210760	Upload Photo	Q17530876
9, Tombland	II	9, Tombland			5 June 1972	TG2333208831; 52°37′53″N 1°17′55″E		1372526	Upload Photo	Q26653637
12, Tombland	II	12, Tombland			26 February 1954	TG2333008848; 52°37′53″N 1°17′55″E		1051810	Upload Photo	Q26303645
13, Tombland	II	13, Tombland			5 June 1972	TG2332808854; 52°37′53″N 1°17′55″E		1210765	Upload Photo	Q26505811
Augustine Steward's House	II*	14, Tombland			26 February 1954	TG2332108860; 52°37′53″N 1°17′55″E		1372527	Upload Photo	Q17531139
The Louis Marchesi Public House	II*	17, Tombland			26 February 1976	TG2331008887; 52°37′54″N 1°17′54″E		1210774	Upload Photo	Q17530889
21, Tombland	II	21, Tombland			5 June 1972	TG2336008845; 52°37′53″N 1°17′57″E		1372528	Upload Photo	Q26653638
Erpingham House	II	22, Tombland			5 June 1972	TG2336208831; 52°37′52″N 1°17′57″E		1210811	Upload Photo	Q26505856
23, Tombland	II	23, Tombland			5 June 1972	TG2336808818; 52°37′52″N 1°17′57″E		1051812	Upload Photo	Q26303647
St Ethelbert	II	24, Tombland			5 June 1972	TG2337708795; 52°37′51″N 1°17′58″E		1051813	Upload Photo	Q26303648
25, Tombland	II	25, Tombland			5 June 1972	TG2338508770; 52°37′50″N 1°17′58″E		1290290	Upload Photo	Q26578506
26, Tombland	II	26, Tombland			26 February 1954	TG2338508746; 52°37′50″N 1°17′58″E		1372529	Upload Photo	Q26653639
27, Tombland	II	27, Tombland			5 June 1972	TG2337108744; 52°37′50″N 1°17′57″E		1210833	Upload Photo	Q26505878
28, Tombland	II	28, Tombland			5 June 1972	TG2335908741; 52°37′50″N 1°17′57″E		1051814	Upload Photo	Q26303649
29, Tombland	II	29, Tombland			5 June 1972	TG2334908740; 52°37′50″N 1°17′56″E		1365722	Upload Photo	Q26647380
1, Tombland Alley	II	1, Tombland Alley			5 June 1972	TG2329208831; 52°37′53″N 1°17′53″E		1372530	Upload Photo	Q26653640
2, Tombland Alley	II	2, Tombland Alley			5 June 1972	TG2329008842; 52°37′53″N 1°17′53″E		1210840	Upload Photo	Q26505882
3, Upper King Street	II	3, Upper King Street			5 June 1972	TG2334808721; 52°37′49″N 1°17′56″E		1051781	Upload Photo	Q26303620
9-13, Upper King Street	II	9-13, Upper King Street			5 June 1972	TG2335508693; 52°37′48″N 1°17′56″E		1051782	Upload Photo	Q26303621
Norfolk Club	II	17, Upper King Street			26 February 1954	TG2337108674; 52°37′47″N 1°17′57″E		1051783	Upload Photo	Q26303622
11 and 13, Wensum Street	II	11 and 13, Wensum Street			5 June 1972	TG2327108957; 52°37′57″N 1°17′53″E		1290167	Upload Photo	Q26578398
1 T0 3, Wright's Court	II	1 T0 3, Wright's Court			5 June 1972	TG2323808886; 52°37′54″N 1°17′51″E		1051761	Upload Photo	Q26303601
4 and 5, Wright's Court	II	4 and 5, Wright's Court			5 June 1972	TG2324308895; 52°37′55″N 1°17′51″E		1051762	Upload Photo	Q26303602

== See also ==
- Grade I listed buildings in Norfolk
- Grade II* listed buildings in Norfolk

== Sources ==
- Wilson, Bill; Pevsner, Nikolaus (1997) [1962], Norfolk 1: Norwich and North-East, The Buildings of England, New Haven and London: Yale University Press, ISBN 978-0-300-09607-1
