= St Martin at Bale =

Demolished medieval church in Norwich, England

- St Martin in Balliva
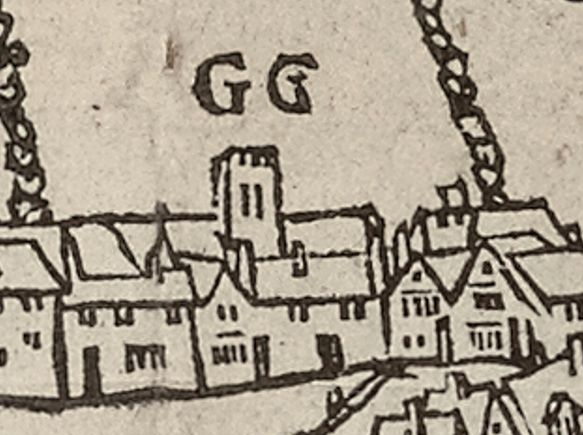
- St Martin at Bale on the 1558 Cuningham Prospect, labelled as "S. Martines on the Hill".
- St Martin at Bale
- 52°37′36″N 1°17′51″E
- OS grid reference: TG 23268 08302
- Location: Norwich, Norfolk
- Country: England

History
- Status: Demolished
- Dedication: Martin of Tours

Architecture
- Closed: 1564

St Martin at Bale, also known as St Martin in Balliva, St Martin on the Hill, or St Martin at the Castle Gate, was a parish church in the city of Norwich in Norfolk, England. It was located near Norwich Castle, within the castle's bailey.

It is unclear when the church was first founded, which may have been before or after the Norman Conquest and the construction of the castle, though the first documentary reference to the church appears in the mid-12th century. During its time, St Martin's churchyard hosted a fraternity of friars, and also acted as a burial site for deaths and executions at the castle. The church was closed and its parish merged with that of St Michael at Thorn in 1564. It was then demolished. In the present day, the church site is now the entrance to Rouen Road from Cattle Market Street.

== Dedication and suffix ==
This church was very likely dedicated to Saint Martin of Tours, being one of around 190 with this dedication in England, one of 17 in Norfolk, and one of three in Norwich, the other two being St Martin at Palace and St Martin at Oak. Its dedication suggests that there was a gateway nearby, either through a southern opening to the town during Anglo-Scandinavian times or a south gate toward Norwich Castle. The 'at Bale' suffix used for the church is an anglicisation of the occasionally used suffix in Balliva, which means 'in the bailey', a post-Norman Conquest addition. Other names for the church included St Martin Berstrete, in 1537 St Martin de Tymmerhill, and in 1558 St Martines on the Hill.

== History ==
A date of foundation for the church is unknown. It may have predated the Norman Conquest and construction of Norwich Castle, as its topographical position suggests this, and its presence may have influenced the construction of the castle earthworks, causing them to be asymmetrical. However, its dedication to Saint Martin suggests a post-Conquest founding. It has been suggested that the church may have been rededicated by the Normans after being enclosed within the castle fee.

The first documented reference to the church appears in a writ by William Chesney, a son of sheriff of Norfolk and Suffolk Robert FitzWalter, from the mid-12th century. The writ confirms the church as property of the monks of Horsham St Faith Priory, also granting the advowsons of this church as well as St Michael de Berstrete to the priory. In the Valuation of Norwich in the mid-13th century, the church was valued at £1. St Martin's was often mentioned as a pair with St Michael's in valuations during this time.

During the 13th century, A fraternity of friars resided in a house in the churchyard. These later joined with the "white friars" in the city, a fraternity that wore white habits but were not Carmelites.

All of those who died at Norwich Castle as well as all criminals executed there were taken to St Martin's churchyard for burial. In 1465, one John Arnald, a weaver and Norwich citizen, requested his burial in the entrance porch of the church, leaving 12d to the high altar. In 1492, one Brother Thomas Balbroke was the church's parish chaplain. Henry Coket, a Norwich barber and also a citizen, gave 6s 8d to the church in his will.

Though the church saw use far into the 16th century, appearing on the 1558 Cuningham Prospect as "S. Martines on the Hill", the parish of St Martin's was eventually merged with that of St Michael at Thorn in 1564 after the church was closed, with this part of the new combined parish being detached from the original parish of St Michael. The right to bury those dying at the castle was transferred to St Michael's also. St Martin's likely saw demolition after this, following its sale by the Crown the same year.

== Location and parish ==
The church existed within the bounds of the Norwich Castle bailey, south of the bailey ditch and north of a lane that was parallel with another ditch further south. In the 12th century, this second ditch may have been reused as an outer hornwork, meaning the church was from then considered to be within the bailey. In the 13th century the castle fee was reduced to follow the bailey ditch which thus put the churchyard of St Martin's outside the castle fee. Following this, properties were built on the south side of the churchyard.

St Martin's parish boundaries are known as they made up the separate section of St Michael's parish after the two were merged. St Martin's parish was bounded by the parishes of St Michael at Plea, St Peter Parmentergate, and St John Timberhill, as well as that of St John the Evangelist until the 13th century. Its northern boundary was the ditch of the castle motte, the eastern boundary being along the lower part of the counterscarp of the eastern south bailey ditch, the southern boundary along the pre-Conquest boundary ditch, and the western boundary dividing the castle's south bailey.

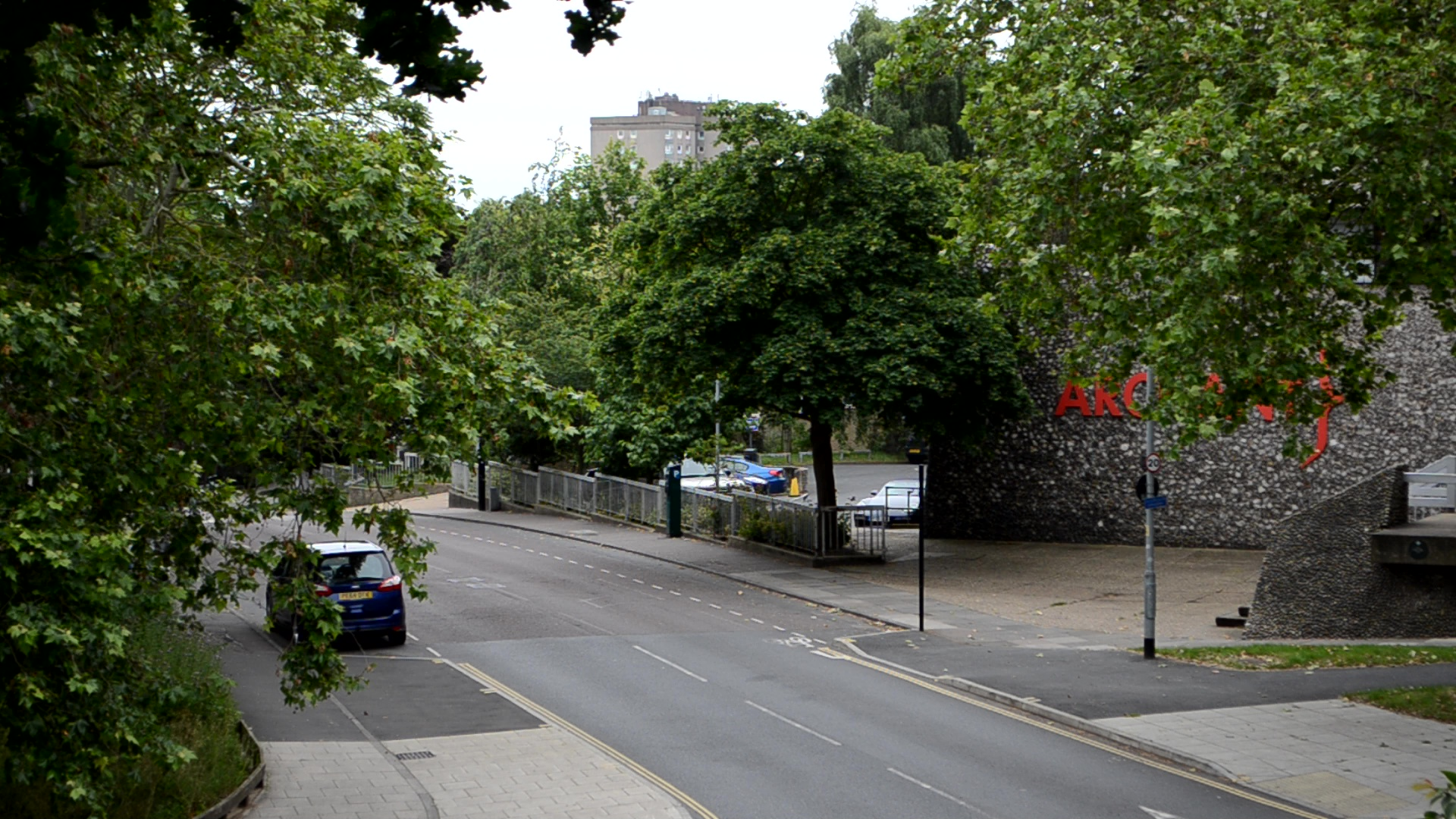
If it existed today, St Martin at Bale would be positioned across the top of Rouen Road.

Following the demolition of the church, this area of open land was known by the 17th century as Skouldsgreene, residing between the churches of St Peter Parmentergate and St John Timberhill. Both Francis Blomefield and John Kirkpatrick attempted to ascertain the exact location of the church site in the 18th century, though Blomefield was most accurate. From 1962, the site became the entrance to Rouen Road from Cattle Market Street; the church would have stood across the road entrance. The Eastern Counties Newspaper building site was developed across part of the site in 1967. The Golden Ball public house resides nearby.

== Archaeology ==
Though parts of the church were thought to be found in 1908, this was incorrect. In 1962, during the construction of Rouen Road, several medieval pits and inhumations were found which were likely part of the St Martin at Bale churchyard. Pottery sherds from the medieval era and later were found, as well as tiles and bricks. Though there was minimal archaeological work, further burials were found. Excavations for the Castle Mall in the 1980s and 90s did not include the church site.
