= St Peter Southgate =

Church ruins in Norfolk, England

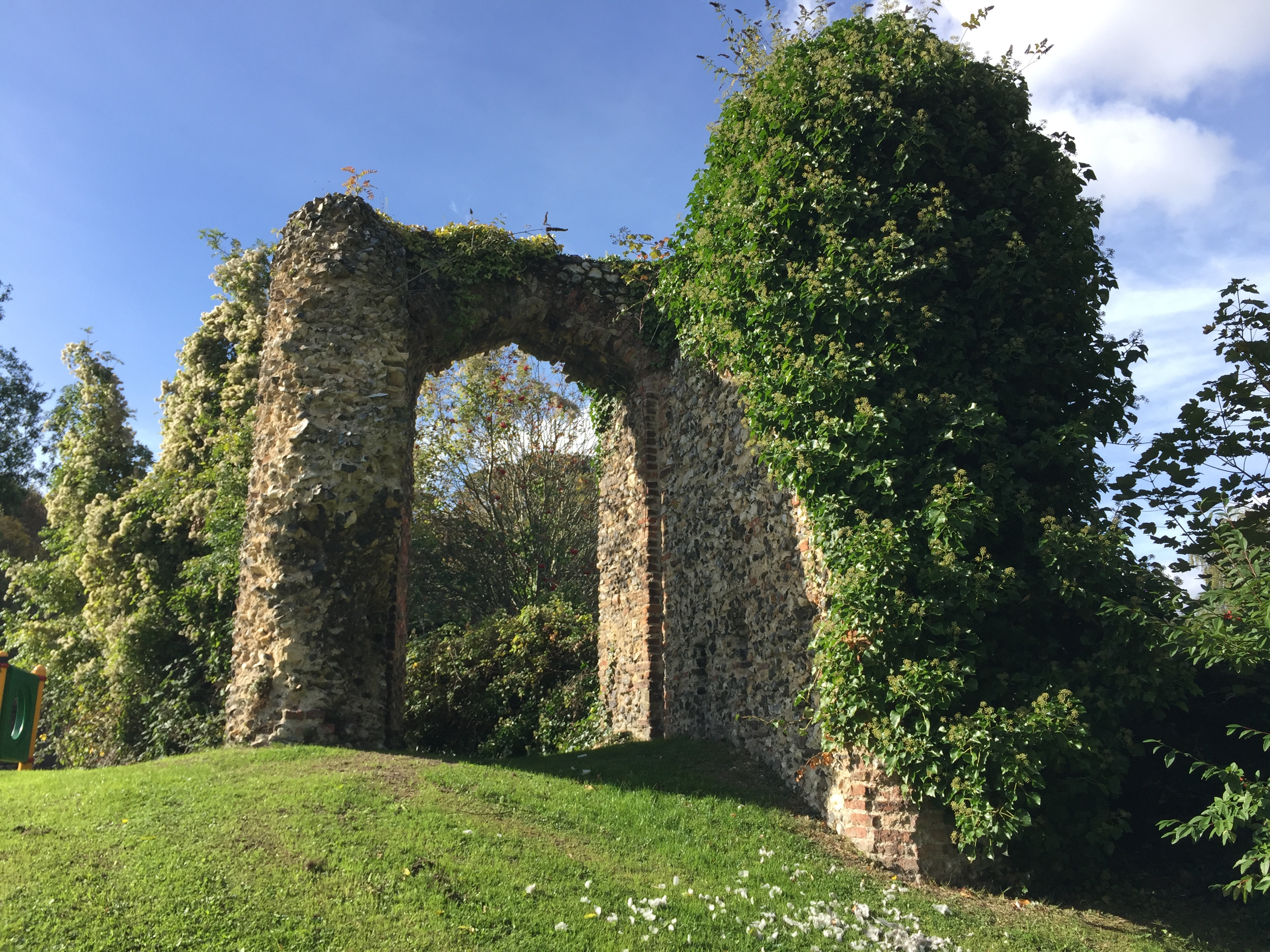
- The remains of St Peter Southgate in 2017
- St Peter Southgate
- 52°37′17″N 1°18′16″E
- OS grid reference: TG 23761 07750
- Location: King Street, Norwich, Norfolk
- Country: England
- Denomination: Church of England

History
- Status: Ruin
- Dedication: Saint Peter

Architecture
- Heritage designation: Grade II listed
- Designated: 26 February 1954

St Peter Southgate is a Grade II listed church tower ruin on King Street in Norwich in the county of Norfolk, England. First documented in a charter of the Benedictine abbey St Benet's at Holm between 1175 and 1186, St Peter Southgate was the fourth church in Norwich to be dedicated to Saint Peter the Apostle. It was one of the smallest churches in the city, featuring a nave, chancel, north transept, and west tower. It was demolished in 1887 after it was made redundant in 1884, its parish absorbed into that of St Etheldreda. Its tower remains as a ruin, the wider site now housing a playground.

== Dedication ==
St Peter Southgate was dedicated to Saint Peter the Apostle, the fourth church in the city with this dedication. The dedication may have been due to the large amount of fishermen that were prominent amongst the parish's population given Peter was a fisherman, as well as its location near to a gate in the city walls, relating to Peter's role as gatekeeper of Heaven.

== History ==
There is no evidence that St Peter Southgate was founded prior to the Norman Conquest. However, historian Andy Shelley has suggested that St Peter Southgate may have been established by the Normans based on its positioning on an early route across Norwich along which several Norman churches reside. The church was definitely in existence by 1175 to 1186, when it was described in a charter as ecclesiam sancti Petri in Cunningesford prope portem civitatis Norwici (the church of St Peter in Conesford next to the gate of the city of Norwich). This charter is the earliest record of the church being under control of St Benet's at Holm, a Benedictine abbey, and also lists clericus Augustine of Hoxne as rector. Ayers et al have suggested that St Peter was created to serve a new parish that was cut out of the parish of St Michael Conesford, making that church's chapel, St Olave, eventually redundant. St Benet's subsequently disposed of St Michael Conesford and kept St Peter Southgate.

Antiquarian Francis Blomefield stated, with an unknown source, that the parish was "anciently known as St Peter Bither". The 1254 Valuation of Norwich, in which the church assessed to hold half a mark (6s 8d), records it as St Peter Southgate. That year, the rector was Simon Sonestryst, likely the same person as Simon de Bergstrete who was listed as rector elsewhere; he was recorded holding an interest in a property on the east side of the nearby Ber Street in 1258 and 1269. After 1300, St Michael Conesford was united with St Peter Southgate. During the church's time as part of the medieval suburbia of Conesford, the city's fishermen met as a guild there. From 1822 onward, the churches of St Peter Southgate and St Etheldreda had the same clergyman. The 1851 religious census recorded that St Peter Southgate's afternoon service was its best-attended, and that it had a small congregation of 40 people with a capacity of 160 available sittings.

=== Redundancy and demolition ===
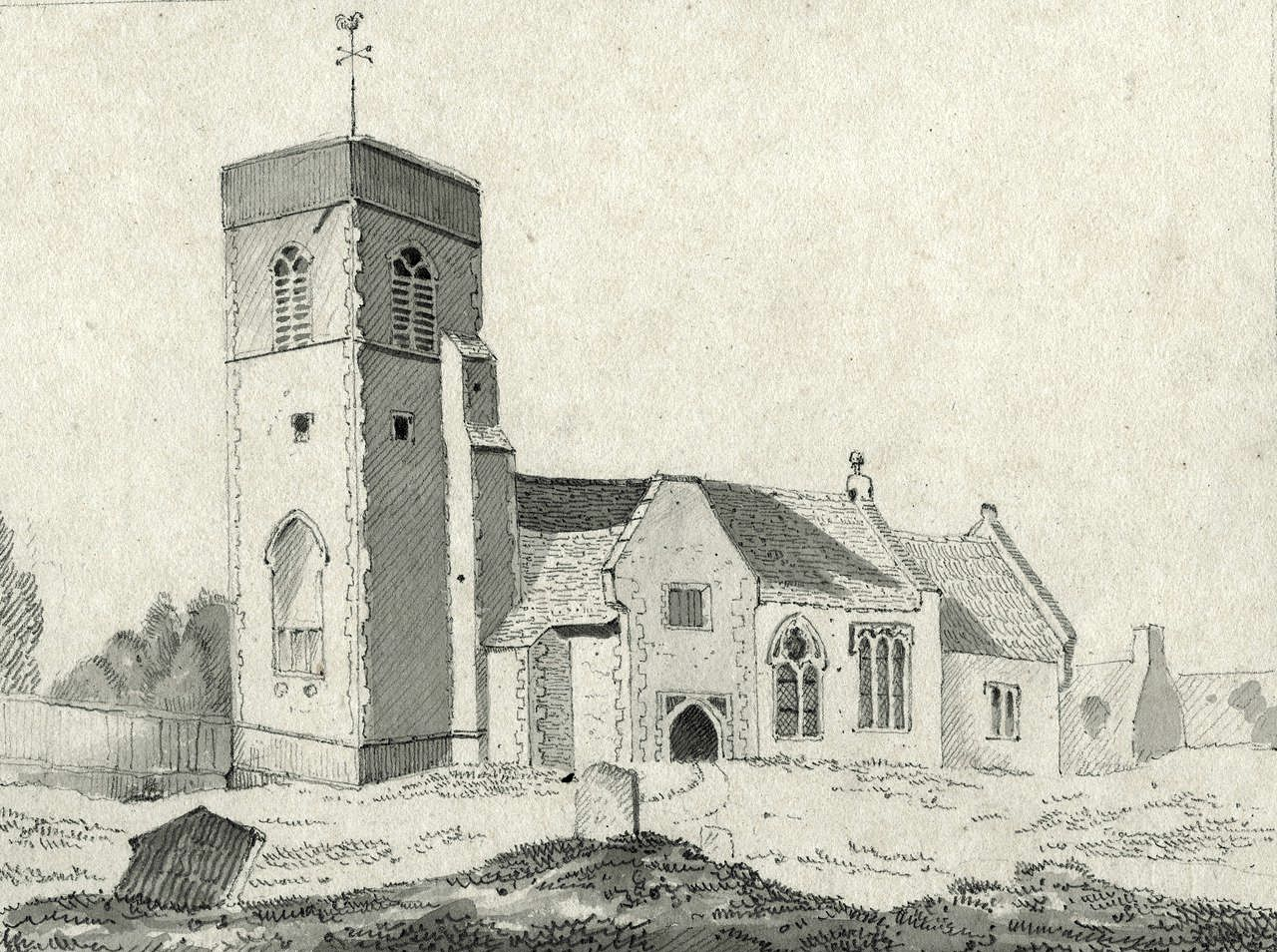
A drawing of the church by Joseph Stannard Junior (1795–1850)

In 1881, it was recorded by the Episcopal Consistorial Court of Norwich that it had been "proposed to delapidate the [...] church". In 1882, an unattributed watercolour of the church was painted, annotated "St. Peter Southgate King Street Norwich about to be pulled down 22 Novr 1882. In the wet". The church remained in use until the parish was united with that of St Etheldreda's in 1884. In 1886, Edward Boardman proposed the conversion of the churchyard into a small park; in a plan, he labelled the church as 'ruins' and devised a path that would run through them. After falling into disuse, St Peter Southgate was demolished in 1887, aside from a fragment of the flint rubble west tower. There was little public protest against the church being demolished, a contrast against the significant support for the preservation of St Peter Hungate in 1905.

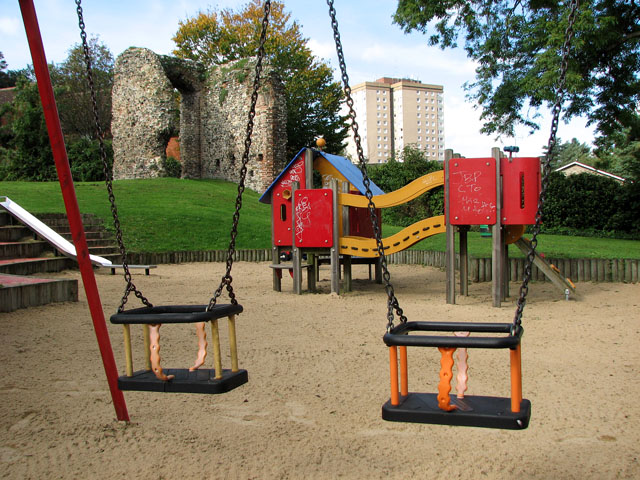
A playground now exists on the site

The ruin has now dilapidated further. It was photographed by George Plunkett in 1931, became a Grade II listed building in 1954, and is now the site of a playground.

== Location and churchyard ==
The church (and now ruin) is located in South Conesford, 150 metres (160 yd) within the city walls, on the west side of King Street in Norwich. It was the southernmost church within the walls. It is close to the Carrow area, and opposite the site of St Olave's chapel. Its churchyard occupied around 0.5 acres (2,000 m^{2}) and the church itself was situated atop ground that rose above King Street. Southgate Lane ran between King Street and Bracondale to the church's north. Land nearby the churchyard was described as the "Croft once Simon Schunncryst" (Simon Sonestryst) in 1290, and was referred to as the Land of St Peter in 1313. In the 13th and 14th centuries, 'free land' that belonged to the church resided to its north and west.

=== Rectory ===
There was a rectory to St Peter Southgate which was on the west side of the churchyard. In 1217, Roger the Rector was living here. The site of this rectory is likely now the gardens of Nos 1, 2 and 3 Southgate Lane. This building was referred to as extant by Blomefield in the 1740s. It would have been tucked under the steep slope of the escarpment that extends from Ber Street. The site is now occupied by late 19th-century housing from after 1883.

=== St Olave's Chapel ===
St Olave's Chapel, dedicated to the Norwegian king Olaf Haraldsson, who died in 1030 and was martyred, was located opposite St Peter Southgate with which it is aligned, and was around 400 metres (440 yd) downstream from St Clement Conesford, and at the 'king's ford', where King Street was at the closest level to the River Wensum. A sandbar came across the Wensum floodplain marshes toward it. It was originally connected in documents to St Michael Conesford. The earliest documentary reference to the chapel is the St Benet at Holm grant dated to between 1186 and 1210. It united with St Peter Southgate after 1300. Whereas Blomefield believed it had been demolished before 1345, more recent study by Elizabeth Rutledge suggests it might have stood into the 1360s. The positioning of St Peter Southgate in alignment with the chapel may have been a political expression of dominance by the Normans.

== Architecture ==
Several plans of the church survive, though Edward Boardman's 1844 plan is the best surviving, and other evidence of the church's other attributes such as its elevation is visible in antiquarian drawings (such as those by John Kirkpatrick, Joseph Stannard and Bosworth Harcourt) and a postcard photograph.

The church had a nave, a chancel, a north transept, and a west tower. It was never particularly large, and was in fact one of the city's smallest churches. It had an internal length of 19 metres (63 ft).

The nave's length was 13 metres (42 ft) and its width was variously noted as 5.2 to 5.5 metres (17 to 18 ft) so was likely between these widths. It was un-buttressed, and had three windows on its south side in a variety of styles, including a Decorated two-light window likely from before 1350 and another square-headed Perpendicular three-light window, possibly also from before 1350. The rectangular chancel, narrower and lower, took up a third of the church's internal length at 6.4 metres (21 ft). There were further windows in the chancel, which also had an ogee-headed piscina possibly of a similar date to those on the south of the nave. According to Boardman's plan, the nave and chancel had a marked division between them on the south side of the church, with the chancel set back by nearly 1 metre (3.3 ft), though on the north side this difference was only 0.3 metres (0.33 yd). The nave and chancel both narrowed toward the east side as a result of the north and south walls not being parallel. All windows on the south side of the church, as depicted by James Sillett, were plausibly from the 14th century. A renewal of the chancel possibly initiated by William Swan, rector until 1498. One William Basset the elder paid for a new glass window on the north side of the chancel, paying 13s 4d for this as well as 3s 4d for the "making of the organs". One Thomas Owbens paid for the other window on the north side.

Around 1500, some work took place on the tower parapet, which had an alternating diamond and circle pattern paid for in part by a gift of 6s 8d from John Isbelles in 1521. At the date of its demolition, it was an un-buttressed square tower. It had a three-light west window as well as a prominent stair turret in the south-east corner. The church also had a two-storey south porch as well as a north chapel, which could be accessed from the easternmost bay in the nave. This chapel was the Lady chapel in the northern transept which was founded by alderman Thomas Large. Large was buried at the chapel in 1518; his merchant's mark was in one of the chapel's two windows.

The roofs were steeply pitched, and remained thatched until at least the late 19th century. While the chancel's roof had collared trusses, the nave ceiling was cambered. Both main ceilings were of plaster, likely on laths. There were two tiebeams in the nave, possibly not of medieval origin. The church likely retained its external plaster, usually removed from unfaced flint rubble churches in the Victorian era.

== Furnishings ==
The church's interior was never reordered; it kept its gallery and box pews until it was demolished. There was a memorial to rector William Swan, and brasses of John Isbelles, Alice Isbelles (north of the altar) and a priest. There was an octagonal font featuring a blank shield on each side, which bore emblems that were likely in paint; the Passion, the Trinity, the martyrdom of Saint Peter, the crowing cockerel, a chalice and wafers, and a shield of arms with argent, a fretty vert and a canton. Around the top was the inscription, "Oh you good people, of your living charity, pray for the souls of Robert Gant, Thomas Fawde and Cecily, with their goods this font did re-edify in the honour of God and our Blessed Lady St Mary and Holy Peter, our avow". Upon the church being demolished, Boardman's plan documents the relocation of its memorials to St Etheldreda's church.

== Archaeology ==
In September 1997, an archaeological watching brief revealed substantial standing remains of the church. This included the walls of the south porch that were over a metre in height and that had kept their knapped flint facings, and parts of the south nave wall.

2011 archaeological work on the site revealed 23 articulated burials, and disarticulated remains collected from truncated grave fills. Most of these were coffin burials from the 19th century, though others may have been earlier. At the rear of the site was evidence of localised chalk extraction in the form of chalk waste. Other finds included worked flint flakes and a core dating from the Late Neolithic to the Bronze Age, as well as Late Saxon, medieval and post-medieval pottery, a medieval ship penny jetton dating to 1490–1550, an oyster shell, and post-medieval coffin furniture.

== Parish ==
The parish of St Peter Southgate had a south boundary lying beyond the city wall, indicating that some parishioners lived outside the city defences. This parish boundary followed a line uphill toward Bracondale, meeting the parish of St Sepulchre. From here, sources disagree; J. Campbell in 1975 showed the boundary going from near the top of Carrow Hill to the south-west corner of the parish of St Edward in a diagonal fashion, whereas the 1883 Ordnance Survey shows it instead going to the corner of Southgate Lane west of St Peter's churchyard and then going north along the bottom of the escarpment slope to a junction with St Edward's parish near St Julian's. After this it is known that the boundary then turned east to the river Wensum and King Street.

The parish was small and of limited wealth.

== Sources ==
- Shelley, Andy (January 2015). "South Conesford, Norwich: A Danish Garrison port?". Medieval Archaeology. 59 (1): 87–102. doi:10.1080/00766097.2015.1119383. ISSN 0076-6097.
