= Ber Street, Norwich =

Historic street in Norwich, Norfolk, England

Ber Street
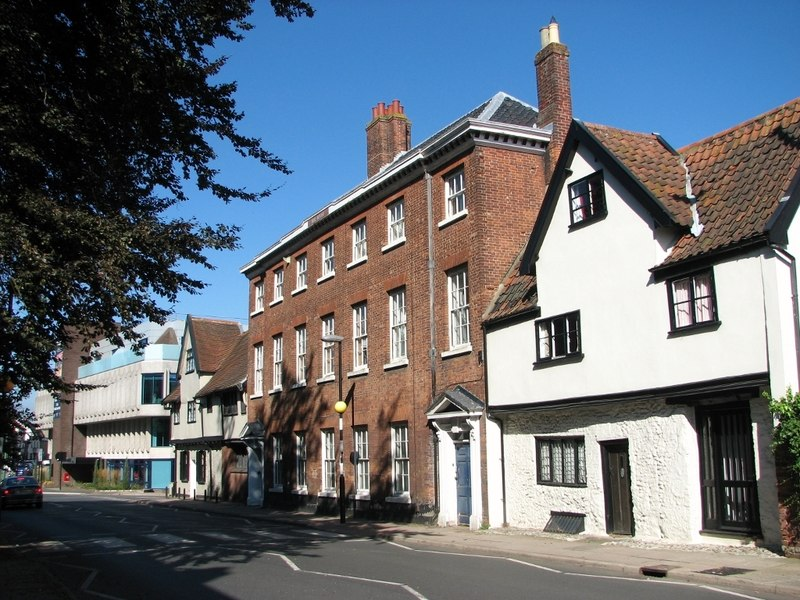
- Buildings from various periods on Ber Street

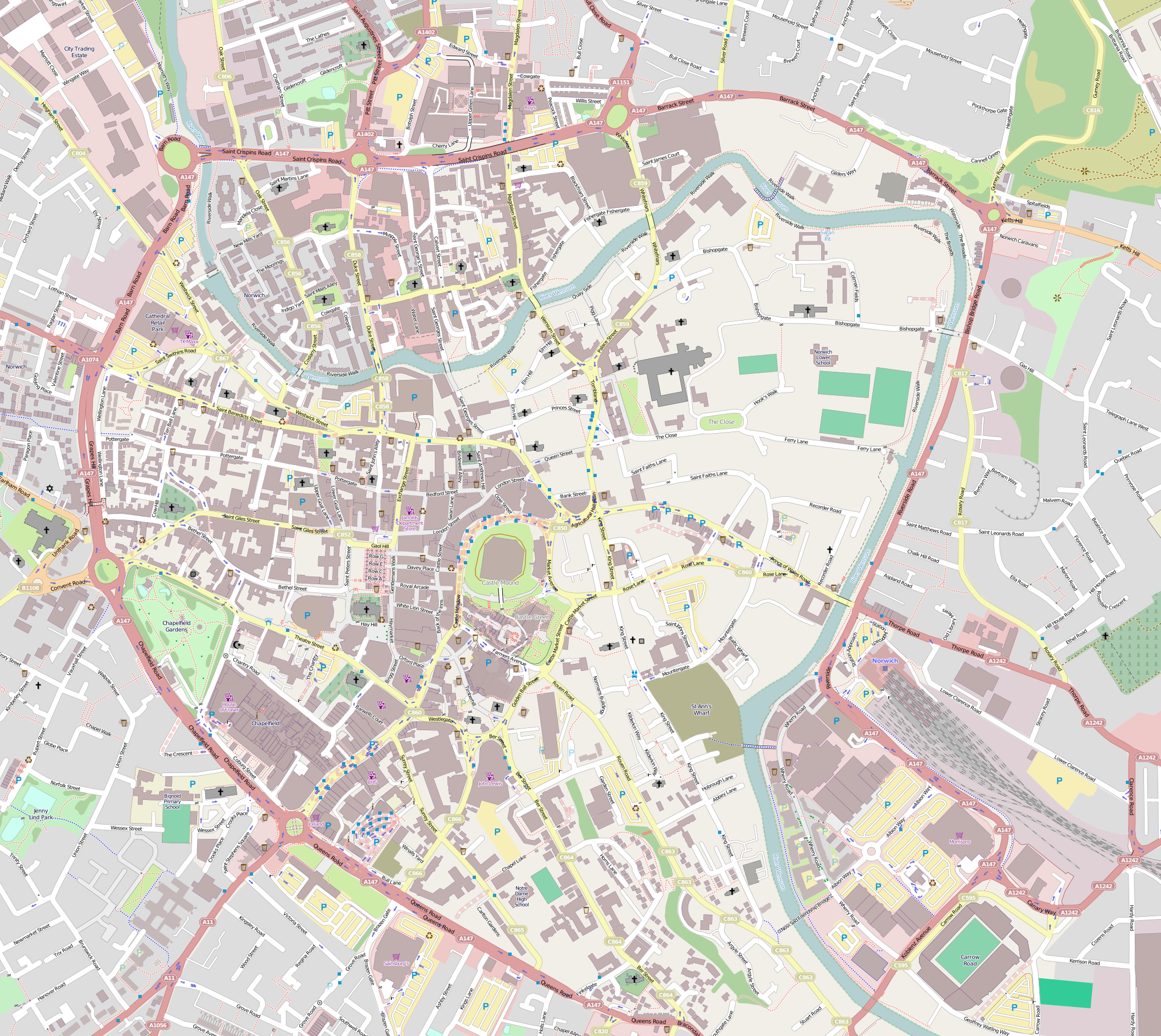
- Location within Norwich
- Maintained by: Norwich City Council
- Coordinates: 52°37′24.2″N 1°17′54.3″E

Construction
- Demolished: 1960s (partial)

Ber Street is a historic street in Norwich, England, located between Queens Road and King Street. It has served as one of the major routes into Norwich city centre since the 12th century. The street now exists as a fragmented row of historical buildings and post-war industrial buildings as a result of Second World War bomb damage and 1960s slum clearance. The street runs along the crest of the Ber Street ridge, a raised portion of land on the western side of the street which leads north toward Norwich Castle and ends with a large mound.

== History ==
Ber Street Gate existed by 1146; it was built on a corner of the city wall which runs southeast and southwest from the gate. Enrolled deeds between 1285 and 1311 show that of the 17 butchers recorded in Norwich, nine existed in the Berstrete leet, with an additional concentration of leatherworkers in this area at the time. A swine market existed at the northern end of Ber Street, in front of All Saints' church.

In 1586, butchers were permitted to slaughter within the walls of the city, though were only allowed to do so on Ber Street. It became known locally as Blood and Guts Street, retaining this nickname into the 20th century.

In the 1640s, the three parishes that lined Ber Street had anti-puritan clergy. One of these, All Saints, was home to many butchers. In 1646, Norwich MP Thomas Atkin urged the mayor to settle a godly preaching minister to the Ber Street parishes, forseeing unrest there. The alderman Adrian Parmenter's house was located on Hogg Hill, close to the butchers on Ber Street. This house was targeted during the 1648 riot that led up to the Great Blow. Rioters communicated using military passwords, such as "for god & kinge Charles", on Ber Street. One rioter, James Sheringham, was seen riding through Ber Street Gate, urging "every one bringe out his armes".

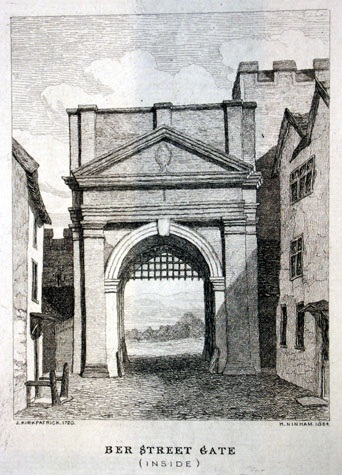
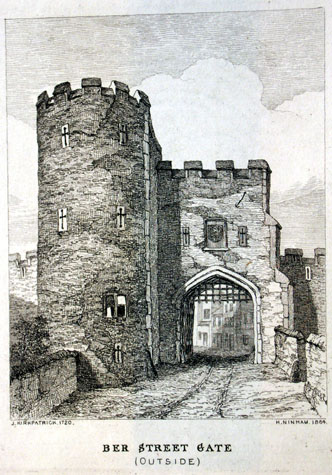
Inside and outside Ber Street Gate by John Kirkpatrick, c. 1720

Ber Street Gate's arch collapsed in 1807, with its north tower being demolished soon after.

During the Edwardian era, the Ber Street area was identified as one of four district-level slum areas in the city, specifically noted as the resort of casual labourers. Social investigator C. B. Hawkins wrote; "To a Londoner accustomed to what Norwich people no doubt refer to as East End slums, it is still something of an adventure to go through the unlighted nooks and corners of Ber Street or Pockthorpe after dark". In 1989, the Jolly Butchers public house on the street was closed, though a Jolly Butchers Yard still exists on Ber Street.

=== Richmond Hill ===
The area between Ber Street and King Street was densely populated from the 1840s onwards. It consisted of many yards and courts leading off Ber Street. Known locally as the Village on the Hill, three main roads, Mariners Lane, Horns Lane and Thorn Lane lead into the district. It became the settlement for a small Italian community, who later set up Vallori's Ice Cream. In 1960, the district was condemned as slums, and many residents were forced to leave due to compulsory purchase orders on the old terraces and lanes.

The whole borough was demolished, which consisted of around 56 acres of existing streets, including 833 dwellings (612 considered unfit for human habitation), 42 shops, 4 offices, 22 public houses and 2 schools. Communities were moved to high rise buildings such as Normandy Tower, or new housing estates such as the Tuckswood Estate, that were being built around the city at the time. A new road, Rouen Road was developed in the area's place in 1962, which consists mainly of light industrial units and council flats. Ber Street had its whole eastern side demolished. Low rise council housing was built in 1967–8.

=== Present day ===
The street currently houses some light industrial units, and one public house, the Berstrete Gates.

== Buildings ==
=== Churches ===
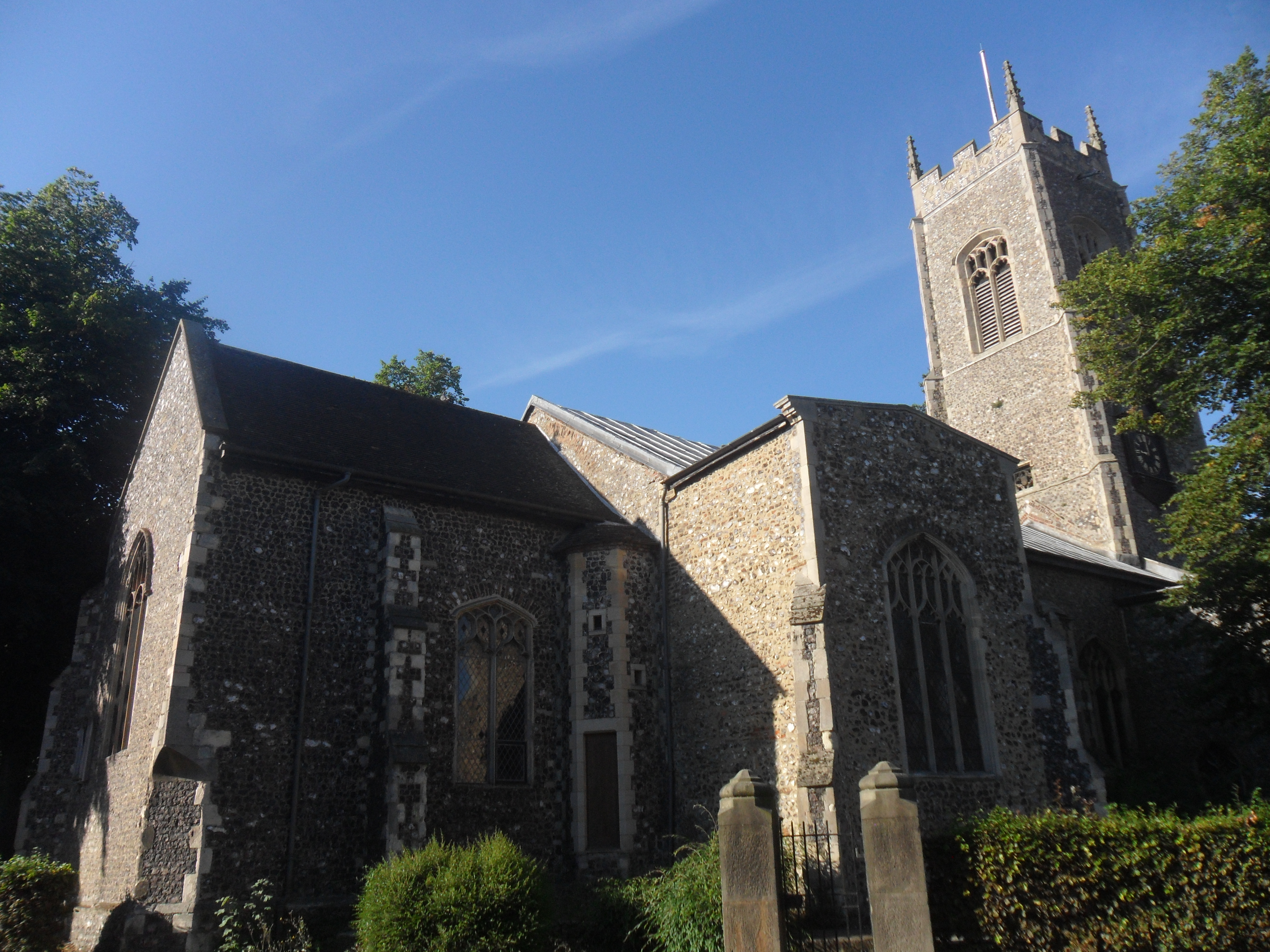
St John de Sepulchre, the only surviving medieval church on Ber Street

Three medieval churches have existed on Ber Street; these are St Bartholomew's which has some remaining ruins, St Michael-at-Thorn which was destroyed by bombing in 1942, and the surviving St John de Sepulchre. The churches are arranged, Brian Ayers et al. have argued, in a manner that evidences an attempt to recreate the topography of Jerusalem; St Bartholomew is associated with butchers who are themselves associated with the Crucifixion of Jesus, whereas St Sepulchre is dedicated to the location of Christ's burial. In this manner, Ber Street acted as a processional route linking the sites, all of which are related to the death and resurrection of Jesus Christ.

==== St Bartholomew ====
St Bartholomew's church was dedicated to Bartholomew, patron saint of butchers, likely in reference to the concentration of butchers on the street. Located on the east side of Ber Street and south of Skeygate (now Horns Lane and occasionally named after the church), it was built of flint with freestone dressings, and likely consisted of a 51-foot-long aisleless nave and a 15-foot-long chancel, both 16 feet wide, as well as a square west tower.

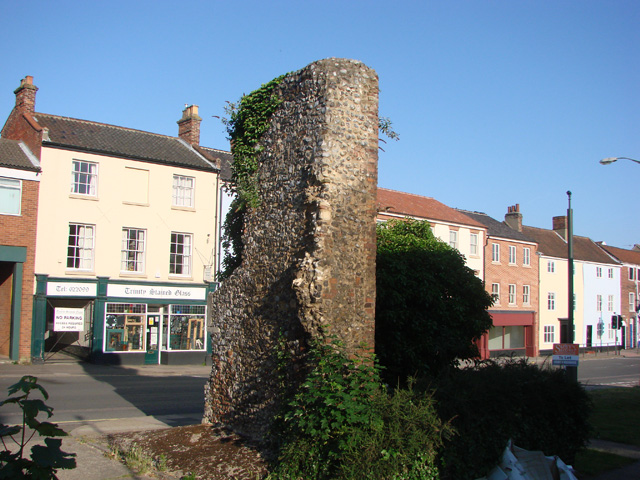
The ruins of St Bartholomew

The first reference to this church, in the mid-13th century, shows that advowson of the church was held by what was then Wymondham Priory (later Wymondham Abbey). Francis Blomefield wrote that this advowson was granted between 1239 and 1243 by John, the son of Robert le Mason of Norwich, and confirmed by Bishop of Norwich William de Raleigh. Its earliest recorded rector was a 'Sir Robert' in 1310, who is likely the rector who in 1309 held a messuage on the west side of Ber Street. Rector in 1315, Jeffrey de Snitterley, held property opposite to St Sepulchre. The church had two bells, including a tenor bell attributed to Norwich bell founder Thomas Potter who was active from 1403 to 1428. Its last rector was Brother George Knyfe from 1527. The church, its rectory and its advowson were granted to Ralph Sadler and Laurence Wynington by the King in 1549 after the dissolution of Wymondham Abbey. The church was desecrated, and its ornaments and two bells were taken to St Sepulchre either in 1538 or 1549. The tenor bell is now at Erpingham church. The parish was united with that of St Sepulchre, but St Bartholomew was not yet demolished. The church is not depicted on Cuningham Prospect of Norwich in 1558, despite still being extant at that time.

The church became a ruin. As late as 1939, susbstantial remains were still standing, having been incorporated into later buildings. On 27 or 29 April 1942, it was bombed during the Baedeker Blitz, leaving it a shell; almost all of the church's remains were demolished in the 1950s, aside from part of the south and west walls of the tower which remain today. The remains of the tower are Grade II listed.

==== St Michael at Thorn ====
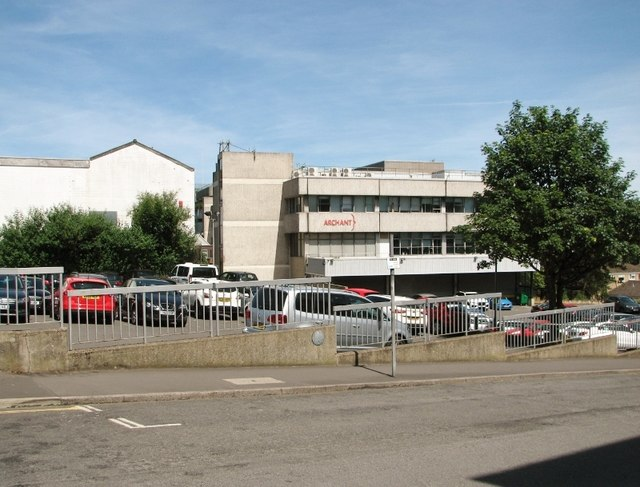
The former site of the now destroyed St Michael-at-Thorn

St Michael at Thorn, historically also known as St Michael super Montem, St Miles on the Hill, and in the late 13th and early 14th centuries St Michael de Berstrete (at Ber Street), was dedicated to the archangel Michael, one of five churches in Norwich to be dedicated in this manner. Its suffix, which is likely not very old, possibly refers to a large thorn tree that existed in its churchyard referred to by Francis Blomefield in c. 1740.

Around 1150, William Chesney gave the church's advowson as well as that of the neighbouring St Martin in Balliva to the monastic foundation of his parents at Horsham St Faith Priory. It was a Ritualist church, though did not attract negative attention for this, unlike its neighbour St John Timberhill. It originally consisted of a nave and chancel with no internal division but with different roofs. It had a square unbuttressed tower with a distinctive crow-stepped parapet and a south porch, all of which were from around 1430. In 1836, a north aisle was added and this was rebuilt in 1874. In the 1870s, the interior of the church was refitted with the addition of east-facing benches. In 1886, its tower fell and was rebuilt the next year. Later interior additions included a rood screen and reredos. The church had a south transept though it is unclear when this was built or demolished.

In 1942, incendiary bombs gutted the church, destroying the roof. Though restoration was initially considered, it was demolished 10 years later. It is now a car park, the only remaining part of the church being its Norman south door which was transported to become the doorway to the cell at the rebuilt St Julian's in the city.

=== Other buildings ===
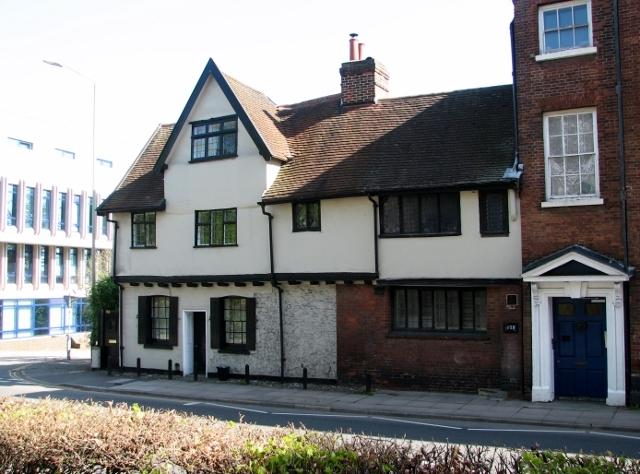
156 Ber Street

Other notable buildings on the street include:

- 4 – Grade II listed 19th-century shop with a 20th-century shopfront.
- 8 – Grade II listed 16th-century former Kings Arms public house with carriage entry on the right. Altered in the 19th and 20th centuries and closed in 1968, becoming offices.
- 81 and 83 – Grade II listed 18th-century shop and cafe.
- 89 and 91 – A former pair of late 17th- or early 18th-century houses. Now an art gallery and workshop.
- 101 – Grade II listed 19th-century shop with 20th-century shopfront.
- 103 – Grade II listed 19th-century shop with carriage entry on the left.
- 121 and 123 – Grade II listed late 18th-century restaurant and studio.
- 125 – former Jolly Butchers public house. 18th century, landlady Black Anna was a jazz singer. Closed 1989.
- 137 – former Horse and Dray public house. Closed 2012, now a Chinese restaurant.
- 139 – Grade II listed 17th-century building with unknown former use, heightened in the 18th century, now a restaurant.
- 156 – Early 17th-century timber-framed house with 19th- and 20th-century alterations.
- Ber House, 158 and 158A – Grade II listed late 18th- or early 19th-century Georgian house with 17th-century remains, now offices.
- Ber Cottage, 160 – Grade II listed 17th-century jettied house.

== Sources ==
- Ayers, Brian; Haynes, Clare; Heslop, Sandy; Lunnon, Helen; Dobson, David (2026). The parish churches of medieval Norwich: city, community and architecture. Oxford and Philadelphia: Oxbow Books. ISBN 979-8-88857-182-8.
