= St Etheldreda's Church, Norwich =

St Etheldreda’s Church
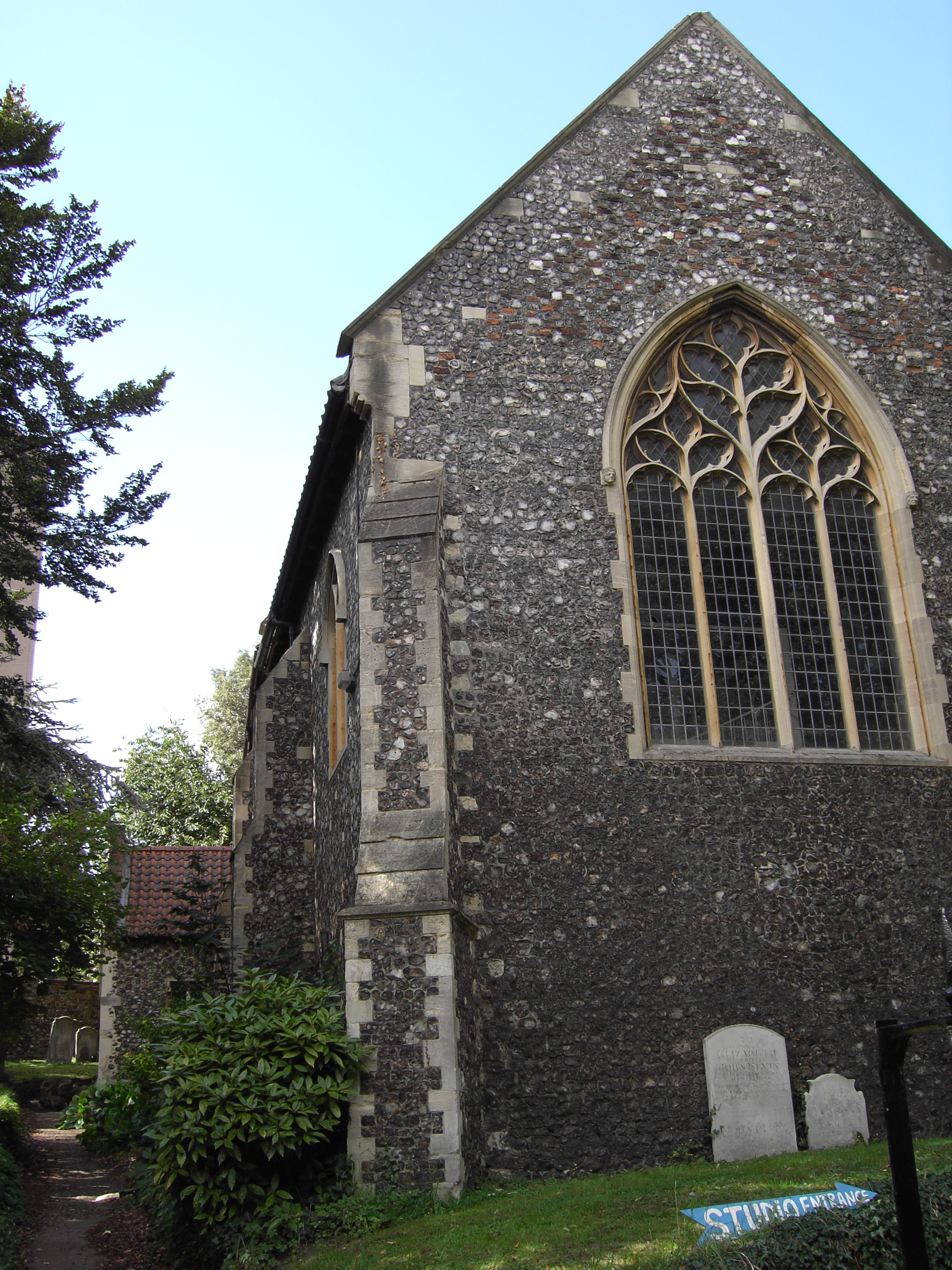
- St Etheldreda’s Church in 2006
- St Etheldreda’s Church
- 52°37′22.04″N 1°18′7.41″E
- OS grid reference: TG 23641 07933
- Location: Norwich, Norfolk
- Country: England
- Denomination: Church of England

History
- Dedication: Æthelthryth

Architecture
- Functional status: Redundant
- Heritage designation: Grade I listed
- Designated: 26 February 1954

St Etheldreda's Church is a Grade I listed redundant parish church in the Church of England in Norwich. Located on King Street, It is one of four surviving round-towered churches in the city, the others being St Julian's, St Mary Coslany and St Benedict's. From 1981 it has been used as St Etheldreda Artist Studio.

== History ==
The church is medieval, dating from the 12th century. The church is dedicated to St Etheldreda, who founded and died at Ely Abbey, a precursor to Ely Cathedral, during the 7th century. Ely is known to have owned a 'fortress' or 'fortified place' (in all likelihood a stone house) in Norwich by the reign of William I; the abbots of Ely had to provide men for the garrison of Norwich Castle, and St Etheldreda's Church may have been associated with a lodging that was built for them.

In 1883, new vicar Nathaniel Bolingbroke initiated a major restoration of St Etheldreda's, recruiting architect Edward Boardman for the task. Boardman's work resulted in the obstruction of much of the church's early detail, adding new windows and a new tiled roof, which replaced the thatch being used up until that point, as well as adding buttresses, refacing flintwork and renewing the existing windows in the late 14th century decorated style. This refurbishment was intended to be in an idealised 'medieval' style, a decision influenced by the Oxford Movement. The church contained an organ by Norman and Beard which dated from 1884. 1884 was also the date at which the parish was united with that of St Peter Southgate, leading to St Peter's being demolished that year.

=== Closure and redundancy ===
In 1961, St Etheldreda's final vicar Selby Strong died, and falling residential numbers after extensive bomb damage in the area in 1942 led to the closure of the church that year. In 1962, the organ and the church bell went to St Francis, Heartsease. By 1970, the church was derelict, though in 1973 it became part of the parish of Parmentergate and was thus declared redundant.

=== St Etheldreda Artist Studio ===
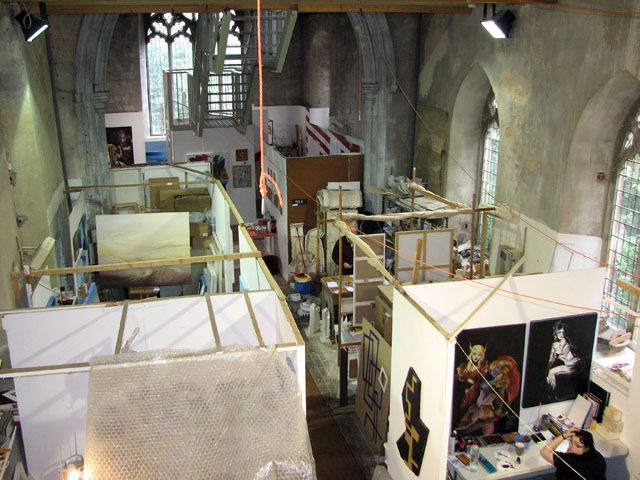
Interior of the church as a studio in 2010

Though it stood disused for five years, from 1975 extensive repairs were carried out. An upper mezzanine floor, north roof skylight, lavatories and kitchen were added in the 1980s to accommodate artists' studios. This was St Etheldreda Artist Studio, a non-profit cooperative set up in 1981 by individuals from Norwich Art School (now Norwich University of the Arts). It was the first studio group to set up in the city, and is rented from the Norwich Historic Churches Trust. It has been used as a sculptors' workshop. As of 2010 it was still being used as an artists' studio with 12 artists active at the time. In 2014, the church was lime washed inside.

== Architecture ==
=== Exterior ===
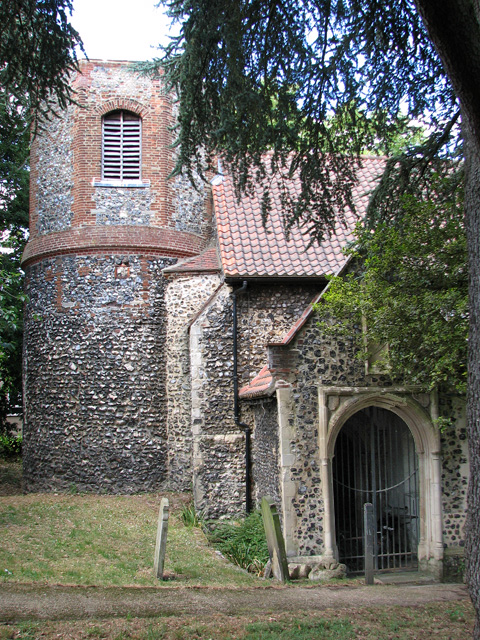
St Etheldreda's round tower, octagonal belfry and Norman doorway

The church has a round 12th century tower with an octagonal top and a brick trim; this octagonal belfry top section was rebuilt in 1723, though much of its outward face is by Edward Boardman.Its south porch was added in the 15th century and is of perpendicular style. This has a damaged nodding ogee niche in one of its gables, and a renewed Norman south doorway. Above this doorway are the coats of arms of its donors.

It features a nave and a chancel with the same width. On the exterior of these, a Norman zigzag string course continues from either side of the inner doorway. The current corner buttress on the left of the church marks the original south-west corner of the nave and a flat Norman buttress to the right is the nave's original south-east corner. The church then drops to a lower level which marks the beginning of the original sanctuary which was probably apsidal. A modern buttress further on marks the start of the later rectangular chancel that replaced this earlier apse. On the north side of the nave is a larger window in the perpendicular style from the late 15th century. A similar one on the south side was restored and is thus younger. There is an area if rebuilt flintwork to the east of the north window which marks the site of a former rood-stair turret. Further to the west the Norman zigzag string course reappears to form a window arch, though this window is now blocked, and a 15th-century doorway below it is now blocks. The church was likely lit originally by a row of single-height round-headed windows. The chancel was refaced by Boardman with flints. The large east window is by Boardman and it replaced a plain wooden one from the 17th century.

=== Interior ===
The nave is aisleless. Little of the original Norman design makes an appearance in the interior aside from the thick walls. There is a tall tower arch which was likely inserted in the 13th century to replace a Norman one. The chancel arch is by Boardman which similarly replaced another. The nave roof is also by Boardman, resting on 15th century wall beams. The chancel roof is newer, from the 20th century.

The font, which formerly had shields on its bowl and small heads on its underside, has now been removed. Nicholas Groves has stated that the church includes only three monuments. One of these, to William Johnston (d. 1611) is from St Peter Southgate which was later demolished in 1887. The other two are to Crisp Brown (d. 1830) and Robert Smith Riches (d. 1845). Nikolaus Pevsner noted two others; one to John Paul (d. 1726) and one to a priest from circa 1485. In 1884, a wall painting of Saint Christopher was uncovered but only a drawing of it survives.
