= St John Timberhill =

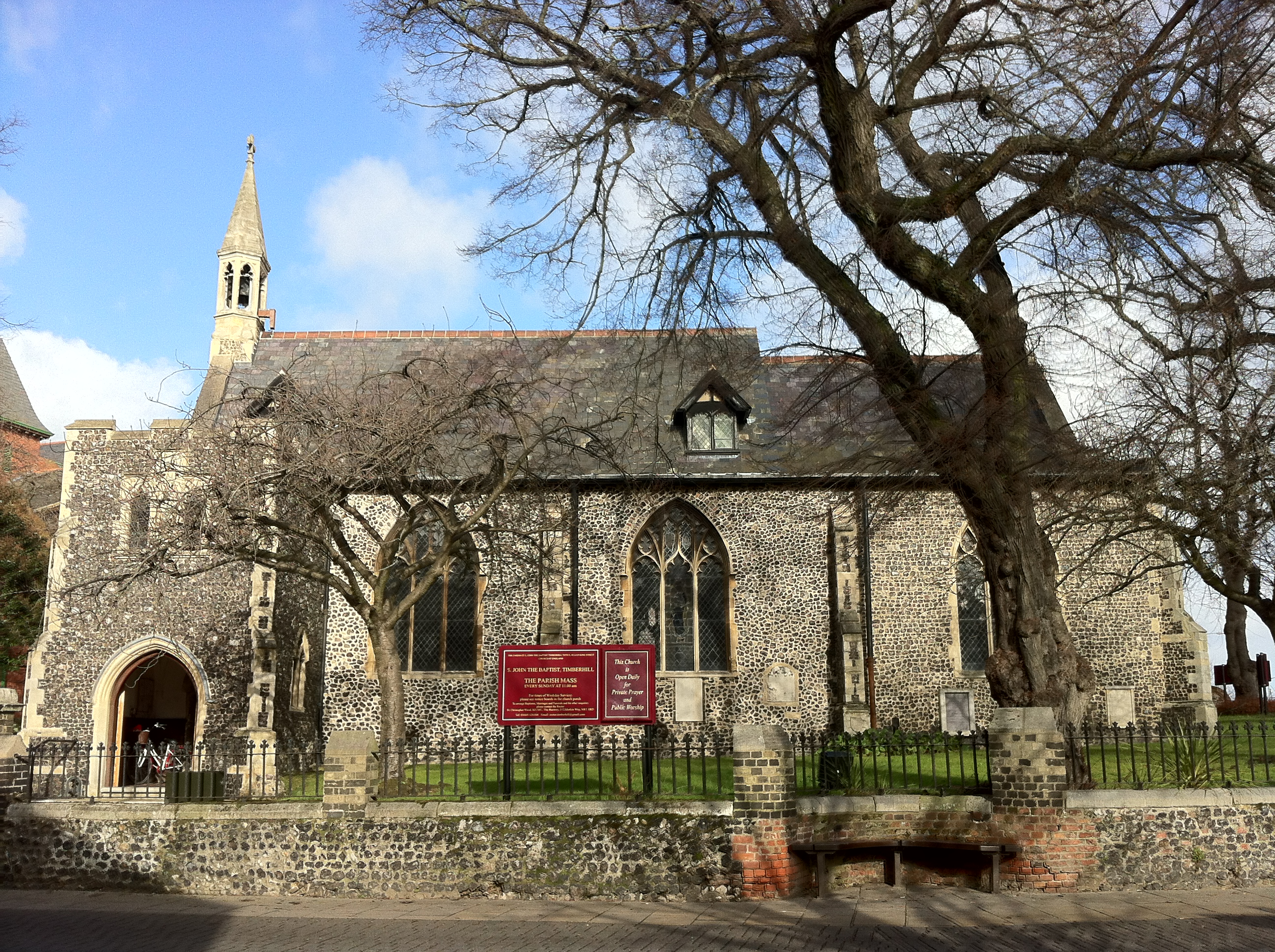
- St John the Baptist's Church, Timberhill, Norwich
- St John Timberhill
- 52°37′33.63″N 1°17′46.46″E
- OS grid reference: TG 23186 08258
- Location: Norwich, Norfolk
- Country: England
- Denomination: Church of England
- Churchmanship: Anglo-catholic
- Website: stjohnstimberhill.org

History
- Dedication: St John the Baptist

Architecture
- Heritage designation: Grade I listed

Administration
- Province: Province of Canterbury
- Diocese: Anglican Diocese of Norwich
- Archdeaconry: Norwich
- Deanery: Norwich East
- Parish: Norwich St John the Baptist Timberhill with Norwich St Julian

Clergy
- Priest: Richard Stanton

St John the Baptist's Church, Timberhill, often shortened to St John Timberhill, is a Grade I listed parish church in the Church of England in Ber Street, Norwich.

== History ==
The church is referred to by early writers as 'St John ad Montem or 'at the Hill', 'St John at the Castle-gate', and 'St John by the Swine-market'.

In 1783 the church was described as consisting of "a nave thatched, a chancel tiled, a south porch and two ailes, with chapels at their east ends, leaded". The tower was square and had five bells.

Some 11th-century fabric remains at the east end, but the building as it stands dates mainly from the 15th century. It is built of flint and brick with stone dressings. All the windows were refaced or replaced in the Victorian period. The nave roof is now tiled. The tower collapsed in 1784 and a stone bellcote was built to replace it in 1877.

== Organ ==
The church contains an organ which has been much modified during the 20th century. A specification of the organ can be found on the National Pipe Organ Register.

== Sources ==
- Pevsner, Nikolaus (1962). Norfolk. 1, Norwich and North-East. The Buildings of England (1st ed.). London: Penguin Books Limited. ISBN 0-300-09607-0.
