= St John de Sepulchre =

St John the Baptist and the Holy Sepulchre
- St John the Theologian
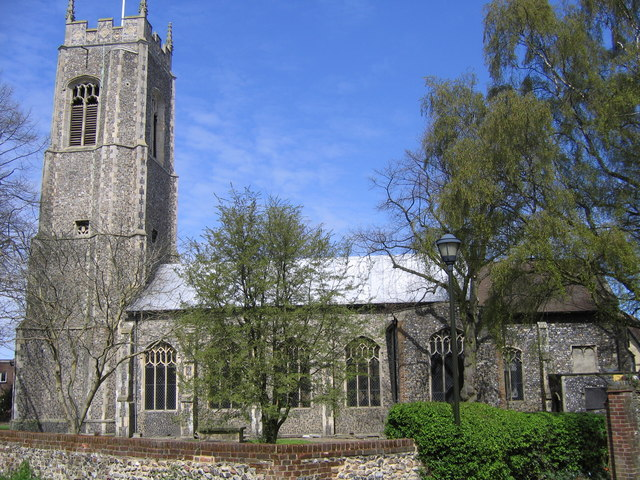
- St John de Sepulchre (then St John the Theologian) in 2006
- St John the Baptist and the Holy Sepulchre
- 52°37′35.5″N 1°17′58.23″E
- OS grid reference: TG 23464 07762
- Location: Norwich, Norfolk
- Country: England
- Previous denomination: Church of England

History
- Dedication: John of Patmos and the Holy Sepulchre

Architecture
- Heritage designation: Grade I listed

The Church of St John the Baptist and the Holy Sepulchre, usually shortened to St John de Sepulchre or St Sepulchre, and known as St John the Theologian during its more recent use by the Orthodox Church, is a Grade I listed redundant parish church on Ber Street and Finkelgate in Norwich, England.

Having existed since prior to the Norman Conquest in 1066, It became part of the Church of England, then after its 1984 redundancy was an Eastern Orthodox Church from 1986 to 2009, and finally re-opened for secular use.

== History ==
The church is medieval, having existed since prior to 1066. Its original dedication was only to John the Baptist, though around the time of the First Crusade around 1096, a second dedication to the Holy Sepulchre was added.

In 1536, money was put aside to build the north transept in the same style as the south one. Churchwardens' accounts from the 1540s show the change in decoration for the church before and after the Reformation. This entailed the replacement of its stained glass windows, including one that had depicted Thomas Becket, with clear glass. Its richly coloured screen was sold alongside communion vessels and other plates, and the church's wall paintings were washed over.

From 1876 to 1890, John Joseph Gurney was vicar. He was influenced by the hugh-church Oxford Movement, leading to the church's interior appearance being brought in line with an imagined medieval style including a painted rood screen, choir stalls in the chancel, an organ and a stained glass window situated over the altar. In 1884, Thomas Lord wrote that at a service he attended there, incense was used, possibly making this church one of the earliest to revive the use of incense. In 1914, John Oldrid Scott erected an elaborate reredos in the church, made by Goodalls of Manchester.

In 1984, the church became redundant. Between 1986 and 2009 it was in use by the Eastern Orthodox congregation, and during this time it was known as St John the Theologian. After this, it reopened for secular use, and in 2017 it became a civil wedding and ceremonies venue called The Flint Rooms.

== Architecture ==
=== Exterior ===
The church has a nave, chancel, north and south transepts, a south porch, and a west stepped tower of 27 metres. The clock face is 18th century and the weathercock commemorates the 1713 Peace of Utrecht. Its flushwork parapets and pinnacled which date to 1901. The north porch is two-storey and of knapped and squared flintwork. It has two friezes of shields over the doorway with an alternating letter 'I', standing for Iohannes (John). Above this is a niche for a statue.

The church has uniform nave windows in the 15th-century perpendicular style. The flintwork on the west wall of the north transept is rough, suggesting that it may have been part of an earlier structure. Here, the door is from the 19th century. The corner of the chancel was moved back to allow for heavy market-day traffic, and the chancel's windows are likely of a later date than those in the nave. There is a large brich arch at the end of the nave and above the chancel roof, constructed to reduce the weight on the interior chancel arch.

=== Interior ===
Inside the church, its porch has a vaulted ceiling, and the inner carved door is medieval. Mock arches in the nave frame the windows, and there is a timber framed roof. The entrances to the tower as well as both transepts have tall, narrow arches. There is a recess south of the tower arch, made for storing staves for processional banners. The chancel has a steeply pitched roof, with several wall monuments and a medieval consecration cross on the south wall, whose scroll reads in Latin, "I will worship Thy Holy Temple".

The church font depicts an East Anglian lion, a medieval symbol of the resurrection of Jesus. This form of font is seen in many other churches in Norfolk. A memorial to Bernard Church, an influential member of the second parliament of Oliver Cromwell and 1651 mayor of Norwich, exists in the church. A specification of the organ can be found on the National Pipe Organ Register.
