= John Kirkpatrick (antiquary) =

British antiquarian

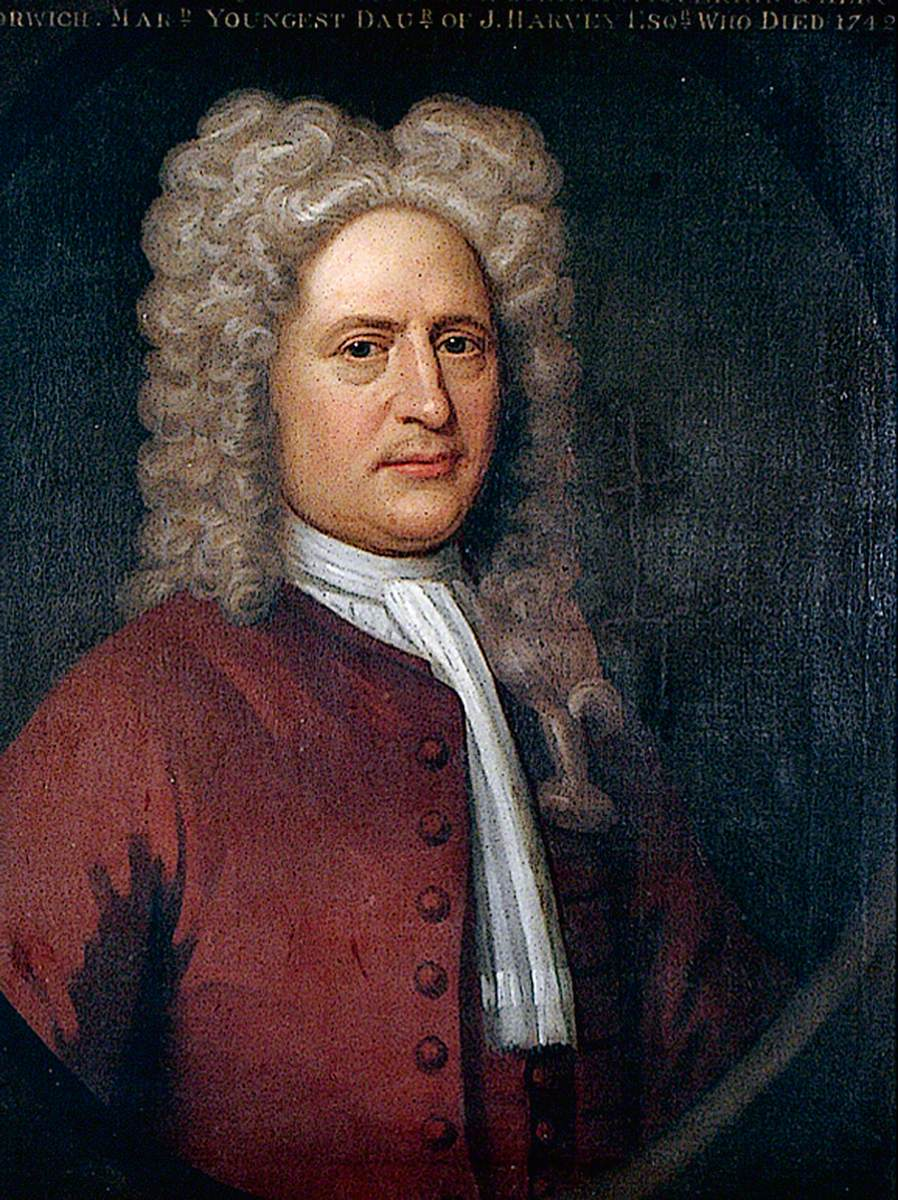
- Kirkpatrick by John Theodore Heins
- Born: 1686?
- Died: 20 August 1728
- Occupation: Antiquarian

John Kirkpatrick (1686? – 20 August 1728) was a British antiquarian.

== Biography ==
Kirkpatrick born about 1686. He was the son of a native of Closeburn, Dumfriesshire, who had settled in the parish of St. Stephen, Norwich. He was apprenticed in the parish of St. Clement, and subsequently established himself in business as a linen merchant in St. Andrew, in partnership with John Custance. In 1726, Kirkpatrick was appointed treasurer of the Great Hospital in St. Helen's. He died without issue on 20 August 1728, aged 42, and was buried in St. Helen's Church, Norwich (mon. inscr. in Blomefield, Norfolk, 8vo ed. iv. 379). He married the youngest daughter of John Harvey, great-grandfather of Lieutenant-colonel Harvey of Thorpe Lodge, Norwich, where his portrait was preserved. It has been engraved by W. C. Edwards (Evans, Cat. of Engraved Portraits, ii. 234). On 18 Feb. 1719 Kirkpatrick was elected F.S.A. (Gough, Chron. List of Soc. Antiq. 1798, p. 3).

Kirkpatrick accumulated copious materials for the history of Norwich. These he bequeathed, after the death of his brother Thomas, to the corporation of Norwich, together with his coins and many of his printed books. Of the manuscripts, which Kirkpatrick fondly hoped would be completed and published, eleven were safe in the custody of the corporation about 1815, but all are now dispersed, except some notes on the tenure of houses in Norwich. A thick quarto volume, devoted to the ‘History of the Religious Orders and Communities, and of the Hospitals and Castle, of Norwich,’ compiled by Kirkpatrick about 1725, was published at the expense of Hudson Gurney, under the editorship of Dawson Turner, in 1845. Turner, in an interesting preface, gives a list of the missing manuscripts. Extracts from Kirkpatrick's papers are cited in Robert Fitch's historical introduction to John Ninham's ‘Views of the Gates of Norwich,’ published by the Norfolk and Norwich Archæological Society in 1861.

Peter Le Neve was Kirkpatrick's intimate friend, and they mutually exchanged their collections for Norwich. Blomefield acknowledged the great assistance which he derived from their labours.

Kirkpatrick was a good draughtsman. In 1723, he published a large north-east prospect of Norwich, in two sheets, engraved by E. Kirkall, which he exhibited to the Society of Antiquaries, together with a plan and Saxon coins found at Norwich. In the previous year his friend Le Neve had shown the society a draft and description of Burgh Castle, Suffolk, by him. His north-east view of Norwich Cathedral was engraved by J. Harris in 1742, and his three views and a ground-plot of the gatehouse of St. Bennet in the Holm Abbey were published by the Society of Antiquaries in ‘Vetusta Monumenta.’ A list of his drawings is given in Gough's ‘British Topography’ (ii. 10, 14, 30, 34, 252).
