= Grade I listed buildings in Breckland =

There are over 9,000 Grade I listed buildings in England. This page is a list of these buildings in the district of Breckland in Norfolk.

== List of buildings ==
Name	Location	Type	Completed (Note: The date given is the date used by Historic England as significant for the initial building or that of an important part in the structure's description.)	Date designated	Grid ref. (Note: The grid reference is based on the British national grid reference system, sometimes known as OSGB36, used by the Ordnance Survey.) Geo-coordinates	Entry number (Note: The "List Entry Number" is a unique number assigned to each listed building and scheduled monument by Historic England.)	Image
Church of St Nicholas	Ashill	Parish church	Early 14th century and later	23 June 1960	TF8840904195; 52°36′10″N 0°46′51″E	1342618	Church of St Nicholas More images
Church of St Mary	Attleborough	Parish church	11th century	16 July 1958	TM0488695393; 52°31′04″N 1°01′06″E	1342445	Church of St Mary More images
Church of St Mary the Virgin	Banham	Parish church	First half 14th century	16 July 1958	TM0634588220; 52°27′11″N 1°02′07″E	1169031	Church of St Mary the Virgin More images
Church of St Botolph	Shingham, Beachamwell	Church	13th century and later	23 June 1960	TF7614005108; 52°36′55″N 0°36′01″E	1077303	Church of St Botolph More images
Church of St Mary	Beachamwell	Parish church	Late 11th century and later	23 June 1960	TF7505805349; 52°37′04″N 0°35′04″E	1077301	Church of St Mary More images
Church of St Mary	Beeston	Parish church	13th century to 15th century	30 May 1960	TF8939015289; 52°42′08″N 0°48′06″E	1342481	Church of St Mary More images
Church of St Mary Magdalene	Beetley	Parish church	14th century	30 May 1960	TF9739418535; 52°43′42″N 0°55′19″E	1077362	Church of St Mary Magdalene More images
Church of All Saints	Besthorpe	Parish church	c.1320 and later	16 July 1958	TM0657695621; 52°31′09″N 1°02′36″E	1342473	Church of All Saints More images
Church of St Peter	Billingford	Parish church	14th century	30 May 1960	TG0130920488; 52°44′40″N 0°58′51″E	1077412	Church of St Peter More images
Church of St Andrew	West Bradenham, Bradenham	Parish church	14th century and later	23 June 1960	TF9171909113; 52°38′45″N 0°49′57″E	1342620	Church of St Andrew More images
Church of St Mary	Bradenham	Parish church	14th century and later	23 June 1960	TF9308708387; 52°38′20″N 0°51′08″E	1151958	Church of St Mary More images
Huntingfield Hall Farmhouse	East Bradenham, Bradenham	Farmhouse	Late 16th century	9 July 1951	TF9269008746; 52°38′32″N 0°50′48″E	1342619	Upload Photo
Church of St Andrew	Brettenham	Parish church	14th century	16 July 1958	TL9320183370; 52°24′51″N 0°50′22″E	1076935	Church of St Andrew More images
Church of St John the Evangelist	Rushford	Church	16th century	16 July 1958	TL9237781293; 52°23′45″N 0°49′34″E	1076906	Church of St John the Evangelist More images
Shadwell Court	Brettenham	Country house	c.1720	18 March 1983	TL9286883087; 52°24′42″N 0°50′03″E	1076940	Shadwell Court More images
Church of St Bartholomew	Brisley	Parish church	15th century	30 May 1960	TF9507221492; 52°45′21″N 0°53′21″E	1077461	Church of St Bartholomew More images
Church of St Mary	Bylaugh	Parish church	14th century	30 May 1960	TG0361818323; 52°43′27″N 1°00′49″E	1077392	Church of St Mary More images
Church of SS Peter and Paul	Carbrooke	Parish church	Late 13th century	16 July 1958	TF9498802224; 52°34′58″N 0°52′36″E	1305276	Church of SS Peter and Paul More images
Church of Holy Cross	Caston	Parish church	c.1300	16 July 1958	TL9593897527; 52°32′25″N 0°53′16″E	1076784	Church of Holy Cross More images
Church of St Mary	Cranwich	Parish church	Late 12th century	23 June 1960	TL7827294870; 52°31′21″N 0°37′34″E	1305340	Church of St Mary More images
Church of St Mary	Cranworth	Parish church	13th century and later	30 May 1960	TF9828604461; 52°36′06″N 0°55′36″E	1077340	Church of St Mary More images
Church of St Nicholas	Woodrising, Cranworth	Parish church	14th century and later	30 May 1960	TF9884103475; 52°35′34″N 0°56′03″E	1172093	Church of St Nicholas More images
Church of All Saints	Croxton	Parish church	12th–15th century	16 July 1958	TL8736086617; 52°26′43″N 0°45′19″E	1076913	Church of All Saints More images
Church of St Nicholas	Dereham	Parish church	12th century	20 August 1951	TF9869113306; 52°40′52″N 0°56′16″E	1077067	Church of St Nicholas More images
Church of St Michael	Didlington	Parish church	14th century and later	23 June 1960	TL7789496946; 52°32′29″N 0°37′18″E	1305343	Church of St Michael More images
Church of All Saints	East Tuddenham	Parish church	12th century and later	30 May 1960	TG0852011526; 52°39′41″N 1°04′55″E	1077352	Church of All Saints More images
St Mary's Church, Elsing	Elsing	Parish church	1330–47	30 May 1960	TG0517016539; 52°42′27″N 1°02′08″E	1342548	St Mary's Church, Elsing More images
Elsing Hall	Elsing	Country house	15th century	4 December 1951	TG0399816011; 52°42′12″N 1°01′05″E	1169052	Elsing Hall More images
Church of All Saints	Foulden	Parish church	14th century and later	23 June 1960	TL7647698976; 52°33′36″N 0°36′07″E	1305354	Church of All Saints More images
Church of St Mary	Little Fransham, Fransham	Parish church	14th century and later	30 May 1951	TF9020312287; 52°40′30″N 0°48′43″E	1152560	Church of St Mary More images
Church of St John the Baptist	Garboldisham	Parish church	13th century	16 July 1958	TM0042481630; 52°23′46″N 0°56′40″E	1306996	Church of St John the Baptist More images
Church of St Paul	Thuxton, Garvestone	Parish church	11th–early 12th century	30 May 1960	TG0324707104; 52°37′25″N 1°00′05″E	1077310	Church of St Paul More images
Church of St Peter	Reymerston, Garvestone	Parish church	13th century and later	30 May 1960	TG0203706006; 52°36′51″N 0°58′58″E	1077312	Church of St Peter More images
Church of St Helen	Gateley	Parish church	15th century and later	30 May 1960	TF9600824532; 52°46′58″N 0°54′18″E	1304679	Church of St Helen More images
Gateley Hall	Gateley	House	17th century	4 December 1951	TF9587623918; 52°46′38″N 0°54′09″E	1342487	Gateley Hall More images
Church of St George	Gooderstone	Parish church	13th century and later	23 June 1960	TF7625402140; 52°35′19″N 0°36′01″E	1342562	Church of St George More images
Church of St Michael	Great Cressingham	Parish church	13th century and later	23 June 1960	TF8521401750; 52°34′55″N 0°43′56″E	1304980	Church of St Michael More images
Manor House	Great Cressingham	Farmhouse	1542 or earlier	9 July 1951	TF8521402011; 52°35′04″N 0°43′57″E	1342581	Upload Photo
Church of St Andrew	Great Dunham	Parish church	Late 11th century	30 May 1960	TF8739214720; 52°41′52″N 0°46′18″E	1077480	Church of St Andrew More images
Church of St James	Great Ellingham	Parish church	Early 14th century	16 July 1958	TM0203797156; 52°32′05″N 0°58′39″E	1248331	Church of St James More images
Church of St Mary	Gressenhall	Parish church	12th century and later	30 May 1960	TF9589815505; 52°42′06″N 0°53′52″E	1342555	Church of St Mary More images
Church of Ss Peter and Paul	Griston	Parish church	14th century	16 July 1958	TL9428299303; 52°33′25″N 0°51′52″E	1172332	Church of Ss Peter and Paul More images
Church of St George	Hardingham	Parish church	13th century and later	30 May 1960	TG0351605132; 52°36′21″N 1°00′15″E	1342569	Church of St George More images
Church of All Saints	West Harling, Harling	Parish church	Late 13th century	16 July 1958	TL9740285166; 52°25′44″N 0°54′08″E	1342501	Church of All Saints More images
Church of St Peter and St Paul	Harling	Parish church	Up to c.1450	16 July 1958	TL9899486682; 52°26′31″N 0°55′35″E	1077452	Church of St Peter and St Paul More images
Church of All Saints	Hilborough	Parish church	14th century and later	23 June 1960	TF8256200016; 52°34′02″N 0°41′32″E	1171997	Church of All Saints More images
Church of St Michael	Hockering	Parish church	13th century and later	30 May 1960	TG0714713218; 52°40′37″N 1°03′46″E	1077354	Church of St Michael More images
Church of Holy Trinity	Hockham	Parish church	First half 14th century	16 July 1958	TL9507192093; 52°29′31″N 0°52′19″E	1077572	Church of Holy Trinity More images
Church of St Andrew	Holme Hale	Parish church	14th/15th century	23 June 1960	TF8872107523; 52°37′57″N 0°47′14″E	1152077	Church of St Andrew More images
Church of St Andrew	Langford	Church	12th century	18 February 1987	TL8375496535; 52°32′08″N 0°42′28″E	1172069	Church of St Andrew More images
Church of St Mary	Kenninghall	Church	Early 14th century	16 July 1958	TM0411886005; 52°26′02″N 1°00′04″E	1168685	Church of St Mary More images
Church of St Andrew	East Lexham, Lexham	Parish church	11th century and later	30 May 1960	TF8598017165; 52°43′13″N 0°45′08″E	1342495	Church of St Andrew More images
Church of All Saints	Litcham	Parish church	1412	30 May 1960	TF8870417651; 52°43′25″N 0°47′34″E	1169244	Church of All Saints More images
Priory Farmhouse	Litcham	Farmhouse	17th century	4 December 1951	TF8881617444; 52°43′18″N 0°47′40″E	1342498	Priory Farmhouse More images
Church of All Saints	Threxton, Little Cressingham	Parish church	Late 13th century and later	23 June 1960	TF8848600140; 52°33′59″N 0°46′47″E	1152169	Church of All Saints More images
Church of St Andrew	Little Cressingham	Parish church	15th century and later	23 June 1960	TF8719400035; 52°33′57″N 0°45′38″E	1077227	Church of St Andrew More images
Church of St Margaret	Little Dunham	Parish church	13th century and later	30 May 1960	TF8635612970; 52°40′57″N 0°45′20″E	1342499	Church of St Margaret More images
Church of St Mary	West Tofts, Lynford	Church	14th century and later	23 June 1960	TL8360392898; 52°30′11″N 0°42′13″E	1077249	Church of St Mary More images
Church of All Saints	Mattishall	Parish church	Late 14th century	30 May 1960	TG0533911066; 52°39′30″N 1°02′05″E	1172400	Church of All Saints More images
Church of St Peter	Mattishall Burgh, Mattishall	Parish church	11th–early 12th century	30 May 1960	TG0565611763; 52°39′52″N 1°02′23″E	1172491	Church of St Peter More images
Church of St. Peter	Merton	Parish church	12th century	16 July 1958	TL9119298023; 52°32′47″N 0°49′06″E	1172419	Church of St. Peter More images
Church of St John the Baptist	Mileham	Parish church	14th century and later	30 May 1960	TF9220119576; 52°44′23″N 0°50′44″E	1342490	Church of St John the Baptist More images
Church of All Saints	Narborough	Parish church	13th/14th century	23 June 1960	TF7465412962; 52°41′10″N 0°34′57″E	1306406	Church of All Saints More images
Church of St Mary	Narford	Church	12th century	23 June 1960	TF7644513779; 52°41′35″N 0°36′34″E	1169691	Church of St Mary More images
Narford Hall	Narford	Country house	1690–c.1704	9 July 1951	TF7666213717; 52°41′32″N 0°36′45″E	1342564	Narford Hall More images
Church of All Saints	Necton	Parish church	14th century	23 June 1960	TF8785409751; 52°39′11″N 0°46′33″E	1152204	Church of All Saints More images
Church of St Martin	New Buckenham	Parish church	13th century	16 July 1958	TM0881290557; 52°28′23″N 1°04′23″E	1077529	Church of St Martin More images
Church of All Saints	Newton By Castle Acre	Parish church	11th century and later	23 June 1960	TF8307315502; 52°42′22″N 0°42′30″E	1077266	Church of All Saints More images
Church of St Mary	North Elmham	Church	13th century and later	30 May 1960	TF9882321500; 52°45′16″N 0°56′41″E	1306186	Church of St Mary More images
Ruined Church and Manor House	North Elmham	Fortified manor house	14th century	4 December 1951	TF9882321609; 52°45′20″N 0°56′41″E	1342523	Ruined Church and Manor House More images
Church of St Nicholas	North Lopham	Parish church	Early 14th century	16 July 1958	TM0363082549; 52°24′11″N 0°59′31″E	1077430	Church of St Nicholas More images
Church of St Mary	Houghton-on-the-Hill, North Pickenham	Parish church	11th century	23 June 1960	TF8692005371; 52°36′50″N 0°45′34″E	1152224	Church of St Mary More images
Church of St Mary	North Tuddenham	Parish church	14th century and later	30 May 1960	TG0559612954; 52°40′31″N 1°02′23″E	1169192	Church of St Mary More images
Barn 110 metres south-east of Old Buckenham Castle keep	Old Buckenham	Former chapel	Mid-12th century	16 July 1958	TM0852390307; 52°28′15″N 1°04′07″E	1306494	Upload Photo
Castle including south-west moat bridge	Old Buckenham	Castle	1140s	16 July 1958	TM0844990393; 52°28′18″N 1°04′03″E	1342469	Castle including south-west moat bridge More images
Church of All Saints	Old Buckenham	Parish church	12th century	16 July 1958	TM0675491431; 52°28′54″N 1°02′36″E	1342465	Church of All Saints More images
Church of St John	Oxborough	Parish church	14th century and later	23 June 1960	TF7441001449; 52°34′58″N 0°34′22″E	1169766	Church of St John More images
Oxburgh Hall	Oxborough	Country house	1482	9 July 1951	TF7425601227; 52°34′51″N 0°34′14″E	1342586	Oxburgh Hall More images
Church of All Saints	Rockland All Saints, Rocklands	Church	11th–15th century	16 July 1958	TL9944096016; 52°31′32″N 0°56′19″E	1248382	Church of All Saints More images
Church of St Peter	Rockland St Peter, Rocklands	Church	12th century	16 July 1958	TL9900197047; 52°32′06″N 0°55′58″E	1277935	Church of St Peter More images
Church of St Ethelbert	Larling, Roudham and Larling	Parish church	12th century	16 July 1958	TL9822789740; 52°28′11″N 0°55′01″E	1076921	Church of St Ethelbert More images
Church of St Mary	Rougham	Parish church	14th century and later	30 May 1960	TF8305120502; 52°45′04″N 0°42′39″E	1169479	Church of St Mary More images
Church of St George	Saham Toney	Parish church	13th century	23 June 1960	TF8992502031; 52°34′58″N 0°48′07″E	1152292	Church of St George More images
Church of St Peter and St Paul	Scarning	Parish church	15th century and later	30 May 1960	TF9540912197; 52°40′20″N 0°53′19″E	1342579	Church of St Peter and St Paul More images
Church of Holy Trinity	Scoulton	Parish church	Early 14th century	16 July 1958	TF9730100957; 52°34′14″N 0°54′36″E	1342847	Church of Holy Trinity More images
Church of All Saints	Shipdham	Parish church	Late 12th century and later	30 May 1960	TF9580007361; 52°37′43″N 0°53′30″E	1342595	Church of All Saints More images
Church of St Peter	Shropham	Parish church	Mid-13th century	21 July 1958	TL9847692789; 52°29′49″N 0°55′21″E	1077578	Church of St Peter More images
Church of All Saints	Snetterton	Parish church	Late 13th century	16 July 1958	TL9940991007; 52°28′50″N 0°56′06″E	1248425	Church of All Saints More images
Church of St George	South Acre	Parish church	14th century and later	23 June 1960	TF8099914318; 52°41′47″N 0°40′37″E	1306357	Church of St George More images
Church of St Andrew	South Lopham	Parish church	Mid-11th century	16 July 1958	TM0394981751; 52°23′45″N 0°59′46″E	1342530	Church of St Andrew More images
Church of All Saints	South Pickenham	Parish church	12th century	23 June 1960	TF8569304167; 52°36′13″N 0°44′26″E	1077235	Church of All Saints More images
Church of St Mary	Sparham	Parish church	14th century and later	30 May 1960	TG0710619665; 52°44′06″N 1°03′58″E	1077360	Church of St Mary More images
Church of St Mary	Sporle with Palgrave	Parish church	13th century and later	23 June 1960	TF8499711462; 52°40′09″N 0°44′04″E	1169820	Church of St Mary More images
Church of St Margaret	Stanfield	Parish church	Early 14th century	30 May 1960	TF9396120762; 52°44′59″N 0°52′21″E	1077388	Church of St Margaret More images
Church of All Saints	Stanford	Parish church	12th century and later	18 February 1987	TL8577594719; 52°31′07″N 0°44′12″E	1172174	Church of All Saints More images
Breckles Hall	Breckles, Stow Bedon	House	1583	21 July 1951	TL9619494470; 52°30′46″N 0°53′23″E	1248439	Breckles Hall More images
Church of St Margaret	Breckles, Stow Bedon	Parish church	11th century	21 July 1953	TL9584094582; 52°30′50″N 0°53′05″E	1248441	Church of St Margaret More images
Church of St Peter and St Paul	Swaffham	Church	15th century	10 January 1951	TF8208808999; 52°38′53″N 0°41′25″E	1269628	Church of St Peter and St Paul More images
Market Cross	Swaffham	Cross	1781–83	10 January 1951	TF8196108908; 52°38′51″N 0°41′18″E	1269570	Market Cross More images
Church of All Saints	Swanton Morley	Parish church	Post-1379	30 May 1960	TG0195717357; 52°42′58″N 0°59′19″E	1077337	Church of All Saints More images
Abbey Farm Cottage	Thetford	Farmhouse	Mid-19th century	10 March 1971	TL8653183489; 52°25′03″N 0°44′29″E	1207935	Upload Photo
Farm building to west of Abbey Farm Cottage	Thetford	Jettied house	Mid-15th century	10 March 1971	TL8650083498; 52°25′04″N 0°44′28″E	1297897	Upload Photo
Ancient House Museum	Thetford	House	c.1490	3 April 1951	TL8690883243; 52°24′55″N 0°44′49″E	1297789	Ancient House Museum More images
Nunnery Barn, Nunnery Bridges Road	Nunnery Place, Thetford	House	16th century	3 April 1951	TL8730982301; 52°24′24″N 0°45′08″E	1207997	Upload Photo
Remains of Priory of Our Lady of Thetford including Prior's Lodging	Thetford	Priory	Late 13th century	3 April 1951	TL8661683369; 52°24′59″N 0°44′34″E	1297875	Remains of Priory of Our Lady of Thetford including Prior's Lodging More images
Priory Gatehouse	Thetford	Cluniac monastery	14th century	3 April 1951	TL8657583524; 52°25′04″N 0°44′32″E	1195946	Priory Gatehouse
Remains of Dominican Church at Thetford Grammar School	Thetford	Church	1335	3 April 1951	TL8675583069; 52°24′49″N 0°44′40″E	1207496	Upload Photo
Remains of Priory of St Sepulchre	Thetford	Church	Before 1148–1536	3 April 1951	TL8649283056; 52°24′49″N 0°44′26″E	1195947	Remains of Priory of St Sepulchre More images
Church of St. Martin	Thompson	Parish church	First half 14th century	16 July 1958	TL9299096946; 52°32′10″N 0°50′39″E	1305018	Church of St. Martin More images
Church of St Mary	Tittleshall	Parish church	14th century	30 May 1960	TF8949821122; 52°45′16″N 0°48′24″E	1077435	Church of St Mary More images
Church of St Mary	Whinburgh and Westfield	Parish church	Late 13th century	30 May 1960	TG0062308927; 52°38′28″N 0°57′49″E	1152030	Church of St Mary More images
Church of All Saints	Wilby, Quidenham	Parish church	Mid-14th century	16 July 1958	TM0310489901; 52°28′09″N 0°59′19″E	1306460	Church of All Saints More images
Church of St Peter	Yaxham	Parish church	Late 11th/early 12th century	30 May 1960	TG0074010710; 52°39′25″N 0°58′00″E	1077296	Church of St Peter More images

== See also ==
- Grade I listed buildings in Norfolk
  - Grade I listed buildings in Broadland
  - Grade I listed buildings in Great Yarmouth
  - Grade I listed buildings in King's Lynn and West Norfolk
  - Grade I listed buildings in North Norfolk
  - Grade I listed buildings in Norwich
  - Grade I listed buildings in South Norfolk
- Grade II* listed buildings in Breckland
