= Grade I listed buildings in Broadland =

There are over 9,000 Grade I listed buildings in England. This page is a list of these buildings in the district of Broadland in Norfolk.

== List of buildings ==
Name	Location	Type	Completed (Note: The date given is the date used by Historic England as significant for the initial building or that of an important part in the structure's description.)	Date designated	Grid ref. (Note: The grid reference is based on the British national grid reference system, sometimes known as OSGB36, used by the Ordnance Survey.) Geo-coordinates	Entry number (Note: The "List Entry Number" is a unique number assigned to each listed building and scheduled monument by Historic England.)	Image
Church of St Edmund	Acle	Parish church	13th century	25 September 1962	TG4011810292; 52°38′14″N 1°32′50″E	1372674	Church of St Edmund More images
Parish Church of Saint Michael including churchyard boundary wall	Aylsham	Parish church	14th century	10 May 1961	TG1926227008; 52°47′46″N 1°15′03″E	1051583	Parish Church of Saint Michael including churchyard boundary wall More images
The Old Hall	Aylsham	Hall house	1686	19 January 1952	TG1884527424; 52°48′00″N 1°14′42″E	1050830	The Old Hall More images
Church of All Saints, Beighton	Beighton	Parish church	14th century	25 September 1962	TG3866508298; 52°37′12″N 1°31′28″E	1051445	Church of All Saints, Beighton More images
Church of St Mary, Moulton	Moulton St Mary, Beighton	Church (redundant)	12th century	25 September 1962	TG4023906670; 52°36′17″N 1°32′47″E	1051486	Church of St Mary, Moulton More images
Church of St Peter	Belaugh	Parish church	12th century	10 May 1961	TG2890518413; 52°42′54″N 1°23′15″E	1050879	Church of St Peter More images
Blickling Hall	Blickling	Country house	c.1619–27	19 January 1952	TG1789428689; 52°48′42″N 1°13′54″E	1051428	Blickling Hall More images
Service range to south-east of Blickling Hall	Blickling	Stable	c.1620	28 March 1988	TG1789428626; 52°48′40″N 1°13′54″E	1051429	Service range to south-east of Blickling Hall More images
Service range to south-west of Blickling Hall	Blickling	Office	1624	28 March 1988	TG1784128643; 52°48′41″N 1°13′51″E	1372691	Service range to south-west of Blickling Hall More images
Church of St Andrew and St Peter	Blofield	Church	14th century and later	25 September 1962	TG3353709196; 52°37′49″N 1°26′58″E	1304595	Church of St Andrew and St Peter More images
Church of St Michael	Braydeston, Brundall	Parish church	13th century and later	25 September 1962	TG3373408682; 52°37′32″N 1°27′07″E	1152849	Church of St Michael More images
Church of St Mary the Virgin	Burgh, Burgh and Tuttington	Parish church	c.1200	10 May 1961	TG2177525052; 52°46′39″N 1°17′12″E	1050928	Church of St Mary the Virgin More images
The Parish Church of St Agnes	Cawston	Parish church	14th century	10 May 1961	TG1340423844; 52°46′12″N 1°09′43″E	1263465	The Parish Church of St Agnes More images
Parish Church of St John the Baptist	Coltishall	Parish church	15th century	10 May 1961	TG2715419758; 52°43′40″N 1°21′45″E	1177913	Parish Church of St John the Baptist More images
Parish Church of St Peter	Crostwick	Parish church	15th century	10 May 1961	TG2578615873; 52°41′36″N 1°20′23″E	1372937	Parish Church of St Peter More images
Church of Holy Innocents	Foulsham	Church	13th century	10 May 1961	TG0328225064; 52°47′05″N 1°00′47″E	1050984	Church of Holy Innocents More images
Church of St Andrew	Wickhampton, Freethorpe	Parish church	13th century and later	25 September 1962	TG4272905467; 52°35′34″N 1°34′56″E	1304784	Church of St Andrew More images
Church of St Mary	Great Witchingham	Church	14th century	10 May 1961	TG1035020047; 52°44′14″N 1°06′52″E	1076900	Church of St Mary More images
Church of St Peter	Guestwick	Parish church	c.1100	10 May 1961	TG0612227048; 52°48′06″N 1°03′22″E	1050963	Church of St Peter More images
Church of St Peter and St Paul	Halvergate	Parish church	Tower c.1450	25 September 1962	TG4175406691; 52°36′15″N 1°34′08″E	1152737	Church of St Peter and St Paul More images
Former tower finial, 22 cm south-west of south-west nave buttress of Church of St Peter and St Paul	Halvergate	Sculpture	Late 17th century	26 February 1987	TG4174406684; 52°36′15″N 1°34′07″E	1051463	Former tower finial, 22 cm south-west of south-west nave buttress of Church of St Peter and St Paul
Church of All Saints	Hemblington	Parish church	12th century	25 September 1962	TG3530211514; 52°39′01″N 1°28′38″E	1051490	Church of All Saints More images
Parish Church of St Mary the Virgin and St Botolph	Hevingham	Parish church	14th century	10 May 1961	TG2013122319; 52°45′13″N 1°15′38″E	1250099	Parish Church of St Mary the Virgin and St Botolph More images
Church of St Peter and St Paul	Heydon	Parish church	14th century	10 May 1961	TG1140027405; 52°48′10″N 1°08′05″E	1305337	Church of St Peter and St Paul More images
Heydon Hall	Heydon	Country house	1581–84	19 January 1952	TG1165027695; 52°48′19″N 1°08′19″E	1372695	Heydon Hall More images
Church of the Blessed Virgin and St Andrew	Horsham St Faith and Newton St Faith	Parish church	c.1200	10 May 1961	TG2160215089; 52°41′17″N 1°16′39″E	1372959	Church of the Blessed Virgin and St Andrew More images
The Priory	Horsham St Faith and Newton St Faith	Farmhouse	12th-century origin	19 January 1952	TG2159715176; 52°41′20″N 1°16′39″E	1152454	The Priory More images
Church of St Andrew	North Burlingham, Lingwood and Burlingham	Parish church	14th century	25 September 1962	TG3653810110; 52°38′14″N 1°29′40″E	1051522	Church of St Andrew More images
Church of St Edmund	South Burlingham, Lingwood and Burlingham	Parish church	12th century	25 September 1962	TG3722808247; 52°37′12″N 1°30′12″E	1152884	Church of St Edmund More images
Church of St Peter	Lingwood, Lingwood and Burlingham	Parish church	Mainly 14th century	25 September 1962	TG3607209038; 52°37′40″N 1°29′12″E	1051521	Church of St Peter More images
Church of All Saints	Marsham	Parish church	13th century	10 May 1961	TG1966623706; 52°45′59″N 1°15′16″E	1250332	Church of All Saints More images
Church of All Saints	Rackheath	Church	Early 14th century	10 May 1961	TG2702214960; 52°41′05″N 1°21′27″E	1050859	Church of All Saints More images
Church of St John the Baptist	Reedham	Parish church	14th century	25 September 1962	TG4278102496; 52°33′58″N 1°34′51″E	1152823	Church of St John the Baptist More images
Church of the Nativity of St Mary with brick retaining wall to the north	Reepham	Parish church	13th century	10 May 1961	TG1013822856; 52°45′45″N 1°06′47″E	1076872	Church of the Nativity of St Mary with brick retaining wall to the north More images
Church of St Peter	Ringland	Parish church	13th century	10 May 1961	TG1338014068; 52°40′56″N 1°09′19″E	1171129	Church of St Peter More images
Church of All Saints	Salhouse	Parish church	14th century	10 May 1961	TG3034014976; 52°41′00″N 1°24′23″E	1295085	Church of All Saints More images
Church of Saints Peter and Paul	Salle	Church	First half of 15th century	10 May 1961	TG1103624888; 52°46′49″N 1°07′39″E	1306145	Church of Saints Peter and Paul More images
Church of St Mary	South Walsham	Parish church	14th century	25 September 1962	TG3653413253; 52°39′55″N 1°29′48″E	1372682	Church of St Mary More images
Church of St Peter	Spixworth	Parish church	14th century	10 May 1961	TG2406815770; 52°41′36″N 1°18′51″E	1152695	Church of St Peter More images
Parish Church of St Mary and St Margaret	Sprowston	Parish church	14th century	10 May 1961	TG2495012528; 52°39′50″N 1°19′30″E	1372986	Parish Church of St Mary and St Margaret More images
Church of St Margaret	Stratton Strawless	Parish church	15th century	10 May 1961	TG2215820767; 52°44′20″N 1°17′22″E	1372972	Church of St Margaret More images
Church of St Nicholas	Buckenham, Strumpshaw	Church	13th century and later	25 September 1962	TG3557005875; 52°35′58″N 1°28′38″E	1304389	Church of St Nicholas More images
Church of St Peter	Strumpshaw	Parish church	14th century	25 September 1962	TG3491607722; 52°36′59″N 1°28′08″E	1051500	Church of St Peter More images
Church of St Margaret	Swannington	Parish church	13th century	10 May 1961	TG1341419281; 52°43′45″N 1°09′33″E	1050924	Church of St Margaret More images
Parish Church of St Edmund	Taverham	Parish church	14th century and later	10 May 1961	TG1608413816; 52°40′44″N 1°11′42″E	1372667	Parish Church of St Edmund More images
Church of St Margaret	Upton, Upton with Fishley	Parish church	14th century	25 September 1962	TG3931012168; 52°39′16″N 1°32′12″E	1372730	Church of St Margaret More images
Church of All Saints including boundary wall to churchyard	Weston Longville	Parish church	13th century	10 May 1961	TG1134415866; 52°41′57″N 1°07′35″E	1372689	Church of All Saints including boundary wall to churchyard More images
Church of St Andrew	Wood Dalling	Parish church	13th century	10 May 1961	TG0897426977; 52°47′59″N 1°05′54″E	1172116	Church of St Andrew More images
Church of St Helen	Ranworth, Woodbastwick	Parish church	15th century	25 September 1962	TG3560414770; 52°40′46″N 1°29′02″E	1154645	Church of St Helen More images
Church of St Mary	Wroxham	Parish church	12th century	10 May 1961	TG2965617540; 52°42′24″N 1°23′53″E	1050868	Church of St Mary More images

== See also ==
- Grade II* listed buildings in Broadland
- Grade I listed buildings in Norfolk
  - Grade I listed buildings in Breckland
  - Grade I listed buildings in Great Yarmouth
  - Grade I listed buildings in King's Lynn and West Norfolk
  - Grade I listed buildings in North Norfolk
  - Grade I listed buildings in Norwich
  - Grade I listed buildings in South Norfolk
