= Rockland =

Rockland may refer to:

== People ==
- Per Bergsland, nicknamed Peter Rockland, one of three successful escapees from Stalag Luft III (the "Great Escape")

== Places ==
=== Canada ===
- Rockland, Greater Victoria
- Rockland, Nova Scotia
- Rockland, Ontario
- Clarence-Rockland, a city which includes Rockland, Ontario

=== United Kingdom ===
- Rockland All Saints, a village in Norfolk
- Rockland St Mary, a village in Norfolk
- Rockland St Peter, a village in Norfolk
- Rocklands, a civil parish in Norfolk comprising Rockland All Saints and Rockland St Peter

=== United States ===
- Rockland, Delaware
- Rockland, Idaho
- Lake Bluff, Illinois, once known as Rockland
- Rockland, Kentucky
- Rockland, Maine
- Rockland (Brooklandville, Maryland), a historic house
- Rockland, Massachusetts
- Rockland Township, Michigan
  - Rockland, Michigan
- Rockland, New York
- Rockland County, New York
- Palisades, New York, once known as Rockland
- Rockland Psychiatric Center in Orangeburg, New York
- Rockland Mansion in Philadelphia, Pennsylvania
- Rockland Township, Pennsylvania (disambiguation) (multiple)
- Rockland (Leesburg, Virginia), a historic house
- Rockland, West Virginia (disambiguation) (multiple)
- Rockland (Shepherdstown, West Virginia), a historic house
- Rockland, Wisconsin (disambiguation) (multiple)

== Other ==
- Rockland (Kim Mitchell album)
- Rockland Centre, a shopping mall in Quebec, Canada
- Rockland (Katzenjammer album)
- Rockland Records, a record label
