= Rockland Township =

Rockland Township may refer to several places in the United States:

- Rockland Township, Ontonagon County, Michigan
- Rockland Township, Berks County, Pennsylvania
- Rockland Township, Venango County, Pennsylvania

See also

- Rockland (disambiguation)
