= Robert Harling =

Robert Harling may refer to:

- Robert Harling (knight) (died 1435), English soldier
- Robert Harling (typographer) (1910-2008), British typographer
- Robert Harling (writer) (born 1951), American writer
