= Edward Fellowes =

Edward Fellowes may refer to:

- Edward Fellowes, 1st Baron de Ramsey, British Member of Parliament
- Sir Edward Fellowes (parliamentary official), Clerk of the House of Commons
- Edward Fellowes (cricketer), English cricketer and clergyman
