= St Peter and St Paul, East Harling =

St Peter and St Paul
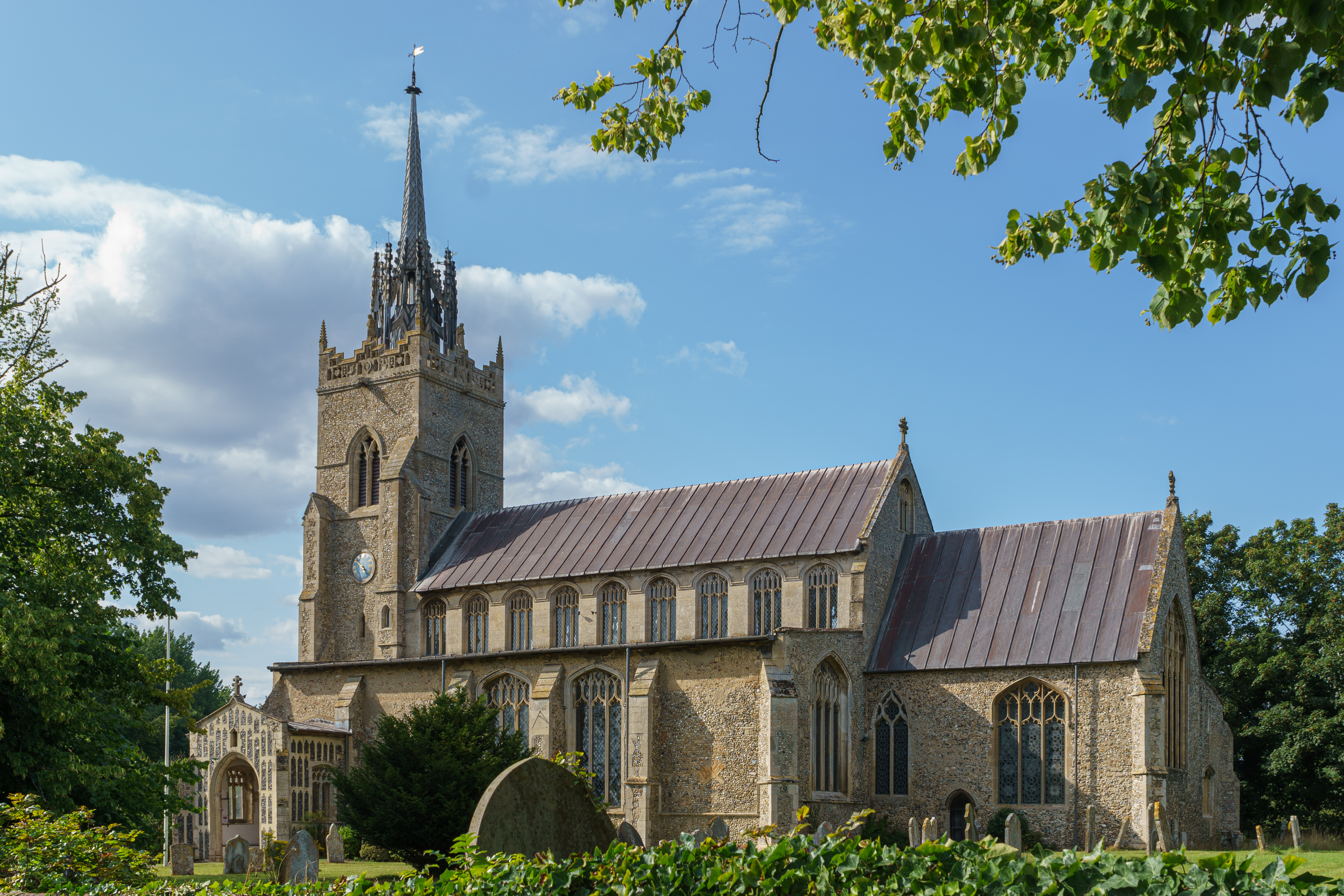
- St Peter and St Paul, East Harling

- Location within Norfolk
- 52°26′30.84″N 0°55′35.04″E
- OS grid reference: TL 98994 86682
- Location: East Harling, Norfolk
- Country: England
- Denomination: Church of England
- Website: East Harling: St Peter & St Paul

History
- Status: Parish church
- Dedication: St Peter and St Paul

Architecture
- Heritage designation: Grade I listed
- Years built: c.1300, some building to c.1450, restored 1878-9

Administration
- Diocese: Norwich

Clergy
- Vicar: Revd Simon Richardson

St Peter and St Paul is a Grade I listed Church of England parish church in East Harling, Norfolk. It is part of Harling United Benefice, a group of five churches that also includes, St Andrew, Brettenham, St Mary, Bridgham, St Ethelbert, Larling and St John the Evangelist, Rushford.

== History ==
The nave with single hammerbeam roof, looking west from the chancel

The lady chapel with canopied parclose screen

A church is record here in the Domesday Book, suggesting continued worship for a millennium. The core of the building, including various windows and doorways, as well as the brickwork of the spire, date from between 1300 and 1340. Sir Robert Herling, whose tomb features in the Lady Chapel, made an initial donation. His daughter, Lady Anne Herling, and her two husbands, William Chamberlain and Sir Robert Wingfield, continued the transformation of the church throughout the 15th century. Most of the building work was complete in the middle of the 15th century, the east window arrived in the latter half, and the tower's parapet and spire towards the end. This flèche spire inspired G.E. Street's for St Peter Mancroft in 1882. The Herling emblems, including unicorns, birds, baskets and a quiver of feathers, feature throughout the church. A major restoration in 1871, costing £1500, replaced the box-pews with the current pews, gave the chancel roof a simple scissorbeam design, and restored the main roof and spire.

== Exterior ==
The buttressed walls are flint with ashlar dressings. The roof is lead, as is the spire which is itself supported by eight flying buttresses. The porch has knapped flint and stone flushwork panelling. The western tower features arched two-light belfry windows on each of its four sides.

The churchyard was bounded by a flint wall in 1829 and was extended to the north in 1928. Most of the headstones in the churchyard date from the 18th century onwards. The lychgate was taken in 1977 from West Harling Church to form a new entrance.

== Interior ==
At the west end is the tower, with a spiral staircase of 73 steps to the ringer's gallery. This also contains the clock mechanism, which was made in 1826 for West Harling Hall, brought here in 1933, and restored in 2004.

The nave roof is a fine single hammerbeam design, steeply pitched to 45 feet (14 metres). Twenty angel corbels support the wallposts of this roof. The spandrels linking the hammerbeams and wallposts are delicately carved with different designs. A collar beam at the roof's east end once supported a pulley for the rowell light. The north aisle, at 20.5 feet (6.2 metres), is wider than south, which is only 12 feet (3.7 metres) wide. The aisles and nave are distinguished by tall arcades with quatrefoil piers forming five bays on each side.

In the centre of the west end of the nave is a large mediaeval octagonal stone font, with fine carvings and a dark wood cover that dates from the 1600s. Nearby are a stone holy water stoup and on the wall a medallion of Sir Thomas Lovell (died 1524), who was Chancellor of the Exchequer to Henry VII and Henry VIII and who built East Harling Manor. The medallion is a plaster replica of a bronze bust (in Westminster Abbey) by Pietro Torrigiano. Also in this area, at the back of the seating, are two sections of mediaeval screenwork. The panels came from the lower wall and gates of a rood screen, and were moved here in 1973. The woodwork, with green, red and gold, is intricately carved with Biblical scenes and the Herling unicorn.

A rare mediaeval church lectern was lost during the 19th century restoration. The current wooden lectern has the form of a large eagle and was donated in 1879 by Elizabeth Norton. The 19th century pulpit was originally from another church and moved here around 1982. The original box pew seating was replaced by pine benches in 1871. These have finely carved ends that reproduce the earlier designs.

=== Lady chapel ===
At the south east of the nave is the lady chapel, which also contains two tombs. This is separated from the nave by a parclose screen. The north facing section of this screen is 14th century, with three-light openings and faded red and green colouring. The west-facing canopied section was once part of a rood screen, and is red, green and gold, with a dark blue sky and gold stars. The Herling unicorn features, as do human faces, dragons and owls. Along the very top are a row of 25 small lion heads with their tongues out. The lady chapel contains four benches, an altar table and communion rail.

=== Chancel ===
In the chancel are two sets of misericord stalls: the north set has two seats and the south four. These date from the 15th century, with 19th century restoration. The seats, when tipped up, reveal a structure upon which one may partially support oneself during long prayers. The face of this structure bears coats of arms. Each armrest has the carving of a beast clinging to it. These are

- South (east to west)
  - A hairy bearded man with sword and shield
  - A wyvern
  - An old lioness
  - An eagle
  - A unicorn
- North (east to west)
  - A griffin
  - A pelican in her piety
  - A lion

The high altar at the eastern end of the chancel is flanked by two tombs. Parishioners lining up at the communion rail may examine the fine mediaeval stained glass in the east window. To the north of the chancel, is St Anne's Chapel and the Jesus Chapel. The latter once formed the ground floor of a two-storey sacristy and was formerly used as the parish schoolroom. This chapel for small services has its own communion rail, carved wooden altar and two chairs.

=== Organ ===
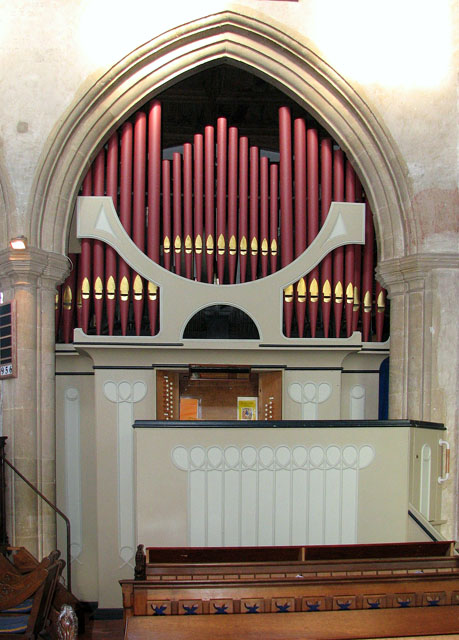
South-facing pipes

West-facing pipes

The Walker Organ

The organ was made by J. W. Walker & Sons Ltd in 1854 for St James' Church in Hatcham, London. When that church closed, the organ was moved here in 1982 and rebuilt. The small organ it replaced was transferred to Binham Priory church. The organ console and small set of pipes face south into the centre of the church while a larger set of pipes face west down the north aisle. The console, action and playing aids were refurbished and extended in 2012. It has 35 speaking stops across two manuals and pedals.

=== Bells ===
The church has a ring of eight bells (six until 1992).

- Treble and 2nd bells. Cast by Mears & Stainbank of Whitechapel in 1908 for St John de Sepulchre, Norwich, and rehung here in 1992.
- 3rd and 4th bells. Cast by Thomas Gardiner of Norwich in 1746.
- 5th bell. Cast by Christopher Grave of Haddenham, near Ely.
- 6th bell. Cast by John Darbie of Ipswich in 1677, and recast by Taylor's of Loughborough in 1912.
- 7th bell. Cast by John Draper of Thetford in 1616, and also recast by Taylor's of Loughborough in 1912.
- Tenor bell. Cast in Norwich around 1520. It weighs 9 long cwt (1,000 lb or 500 kg).

=== Tombs ===
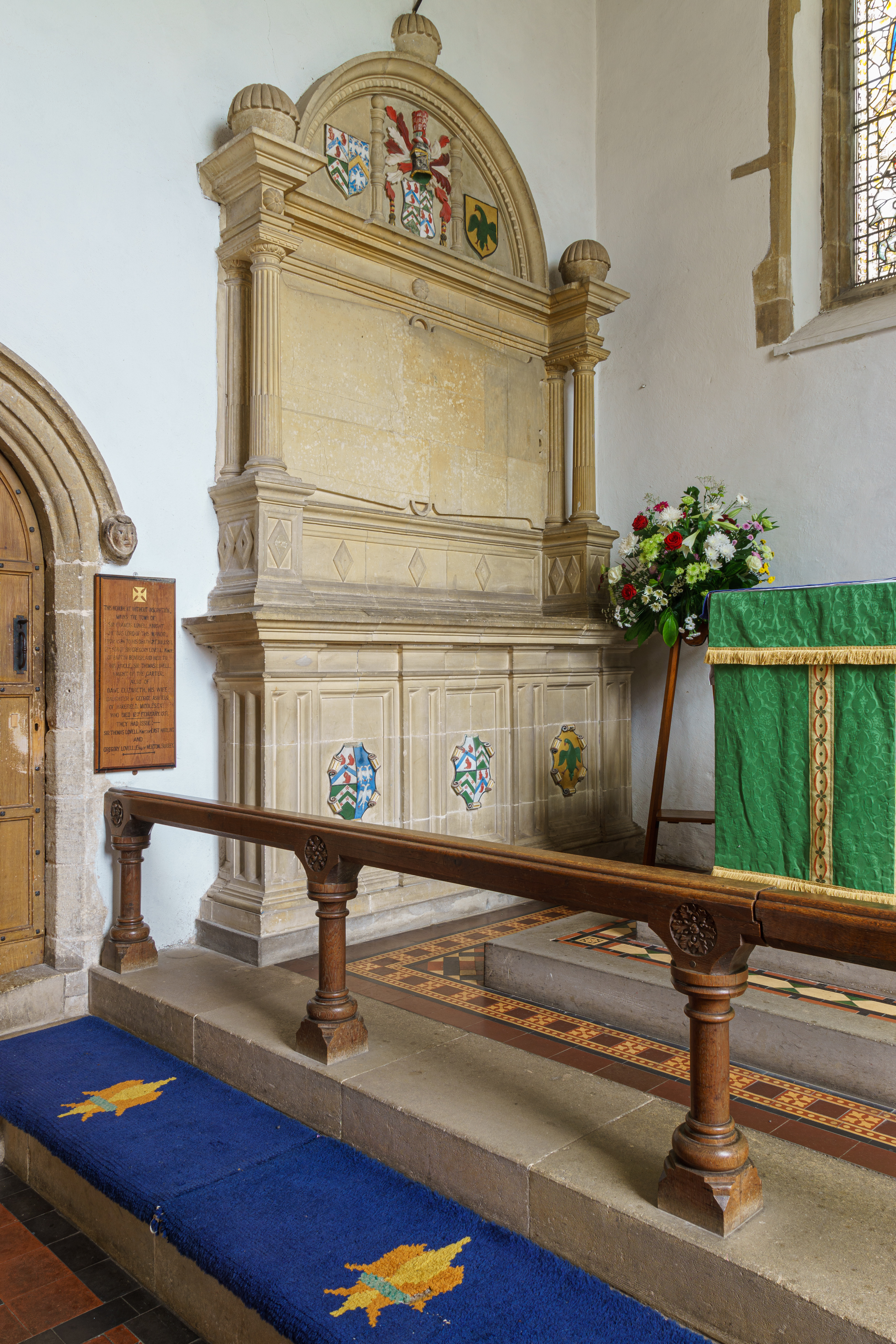
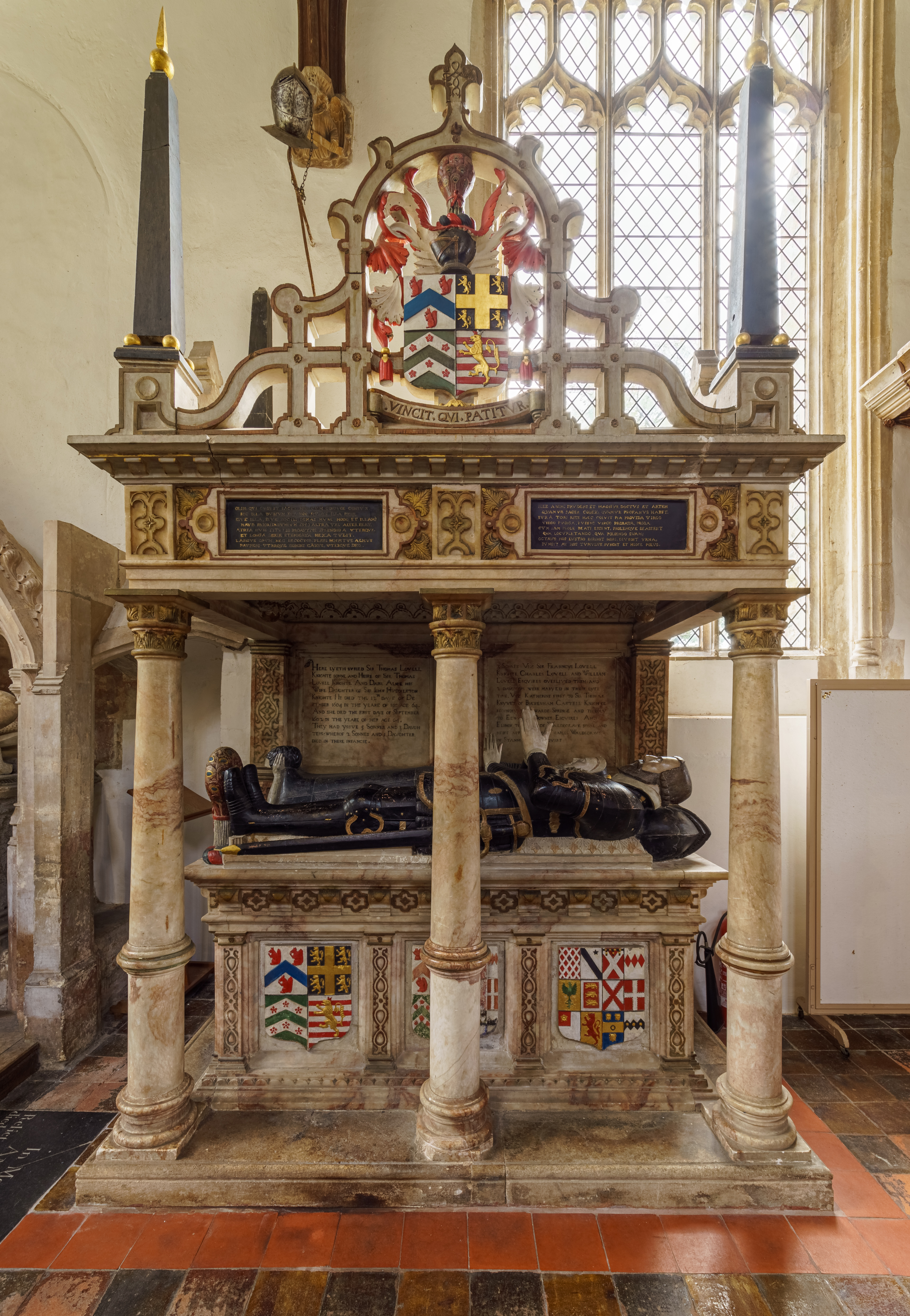
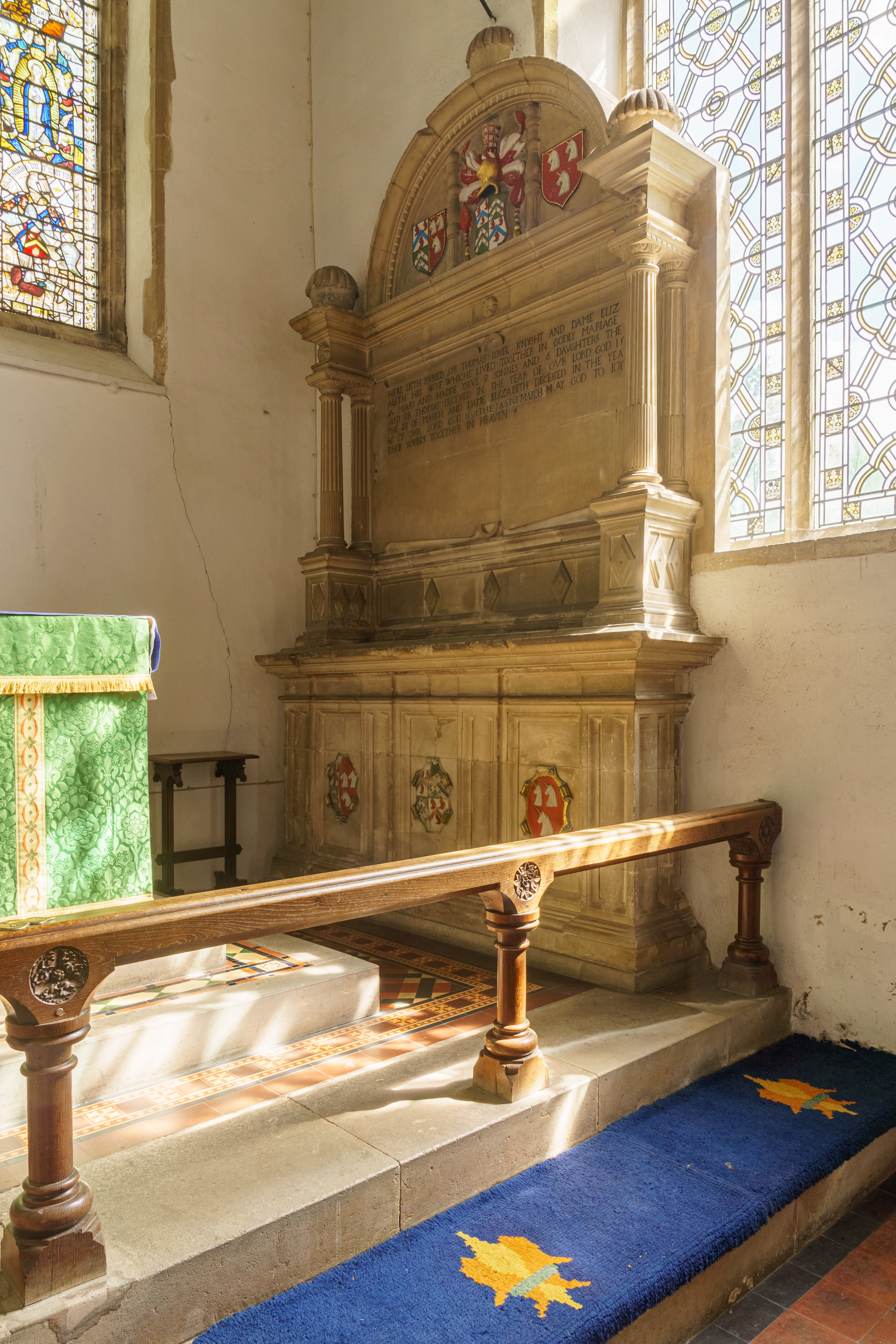
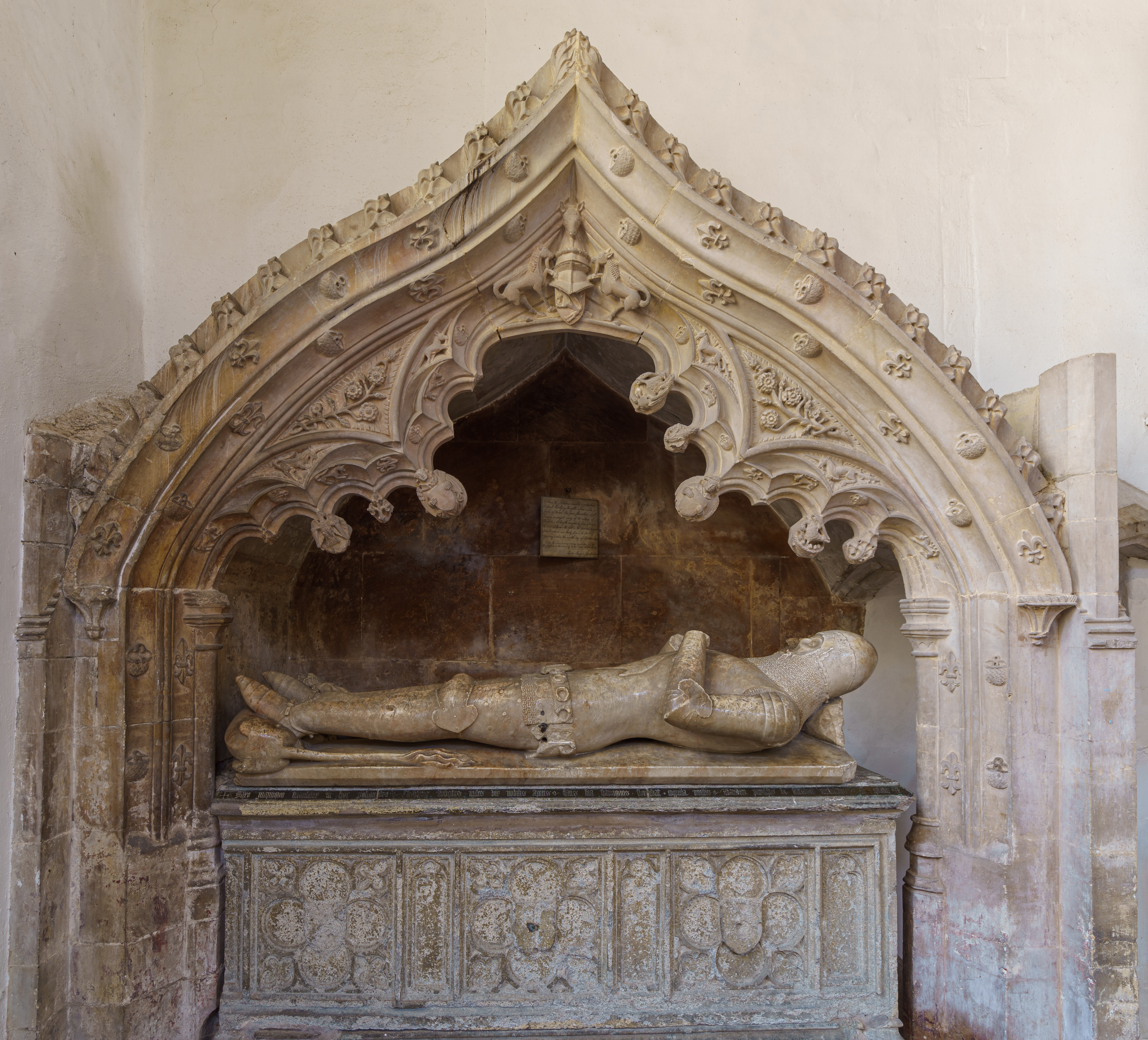
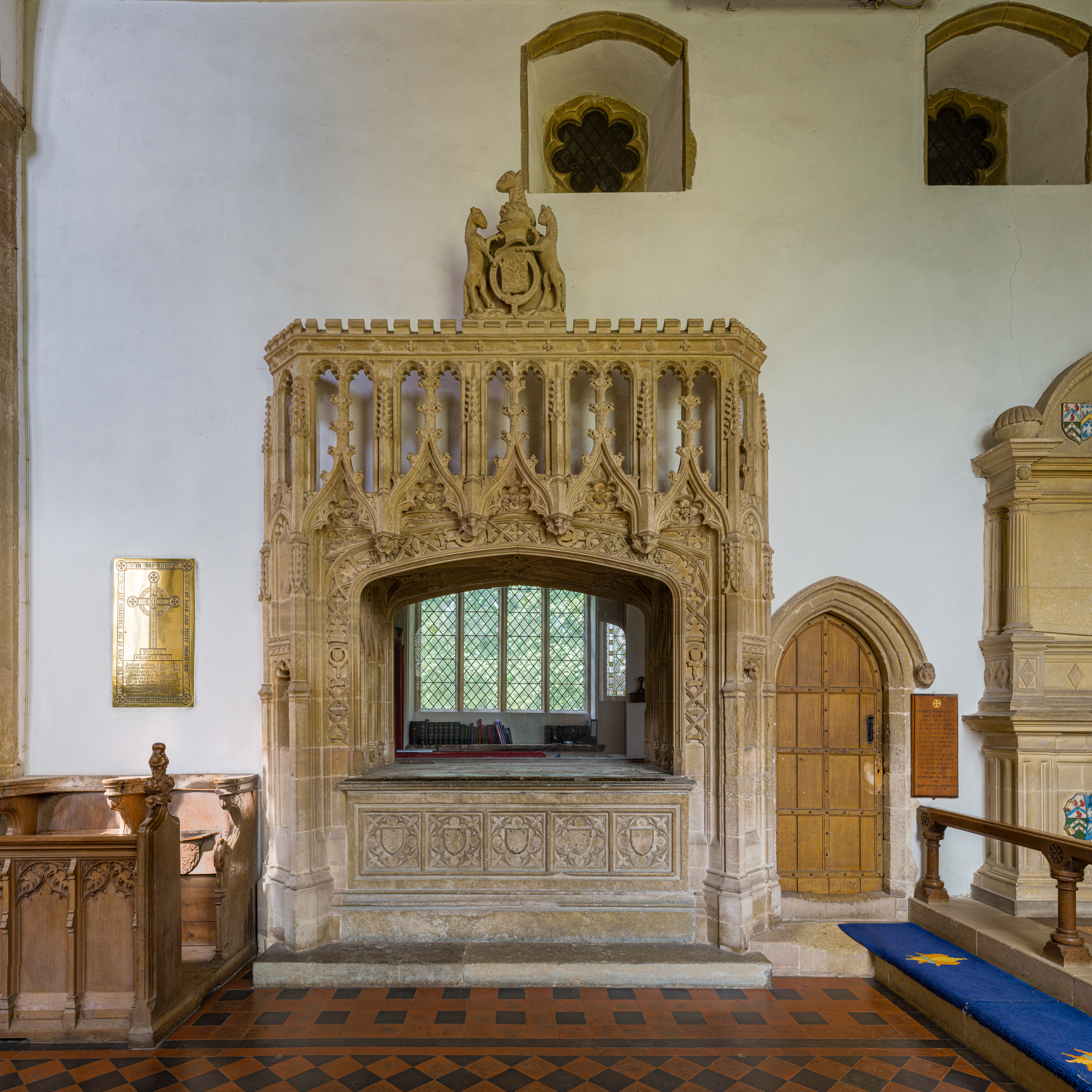
Tombs

The church contains five tombs or monuments featuring the Herling (also spelled Harling) and Lovell families.

- The oldest tomb is of Sir Robert Herling (died 1435), and Lady Joan. The tomb chest is recessed in the south wall of the Lady Chapel. A Purbeck marble tomb-slab supports two alabaster figures: a knight and a lady. These figures are thought to be late 14th century, possibly from an earlier tomb for parents or grandparents. Overhead is an elaborate canopy with fine stone carving, including coat of arms.
- The Easter Sepulchre forms a hagioscope or squint between the chancel and St Anne's Chapel. It also serves as the tomb of Lady Anne Herling (died 1498), daughter of Sir Robert Herling, and her first husband, Sir William Chamberlain (died 1462). Sir William also appears in the bottom right of the Eastern Window. Atop the Easter Sepulchre in the chancel-side is Sir William Chamberlain's coat of arms. Anne's coat of arms features on the top of the chapel side.
- At the north of the chancel is the tomb of Sir Francis Lovell (died 1550) and Dame Ann (died 1551). Sir Francis was nephew and heir of Sir Thomas Lovell (died 1524). Three coats of arms feature at the top and on the face of the tomb-chest. A morion helmet hangs on the wall above this tomb.
- In matching style, at the south of the chancel is the tomb of the son of Sir Francis, another Sir Thomas Lovell (died 1557) and Dame Elizabeth (died 1591). Again three coats of arms feature at the top and on the face of the tomb-chest. A bascinet helmet hangs on the wall above this tomb.
- In the Lady Chapel, is the elaborate tomb of yet another Sir Thomas Lovell (died 1604) and Dame Alice (died 1602). Painted and gilded effigies lie atop the tomb-chest, their hands clasped in prayer. Sir Thomas's head rests on his helmet, which is identical to a helmet that hangs on the wall above the tomb, and at his feet is a peacock's feathers. Alice's head lies on a cushion and at her feet is a Saracen's scalp, held up by a pair of arms. The canopy is supported by three Corinthian columns and topped with three black obelisks. Many coats of arms feature in the canopy and face of the tomb-chest.

=== East window ===
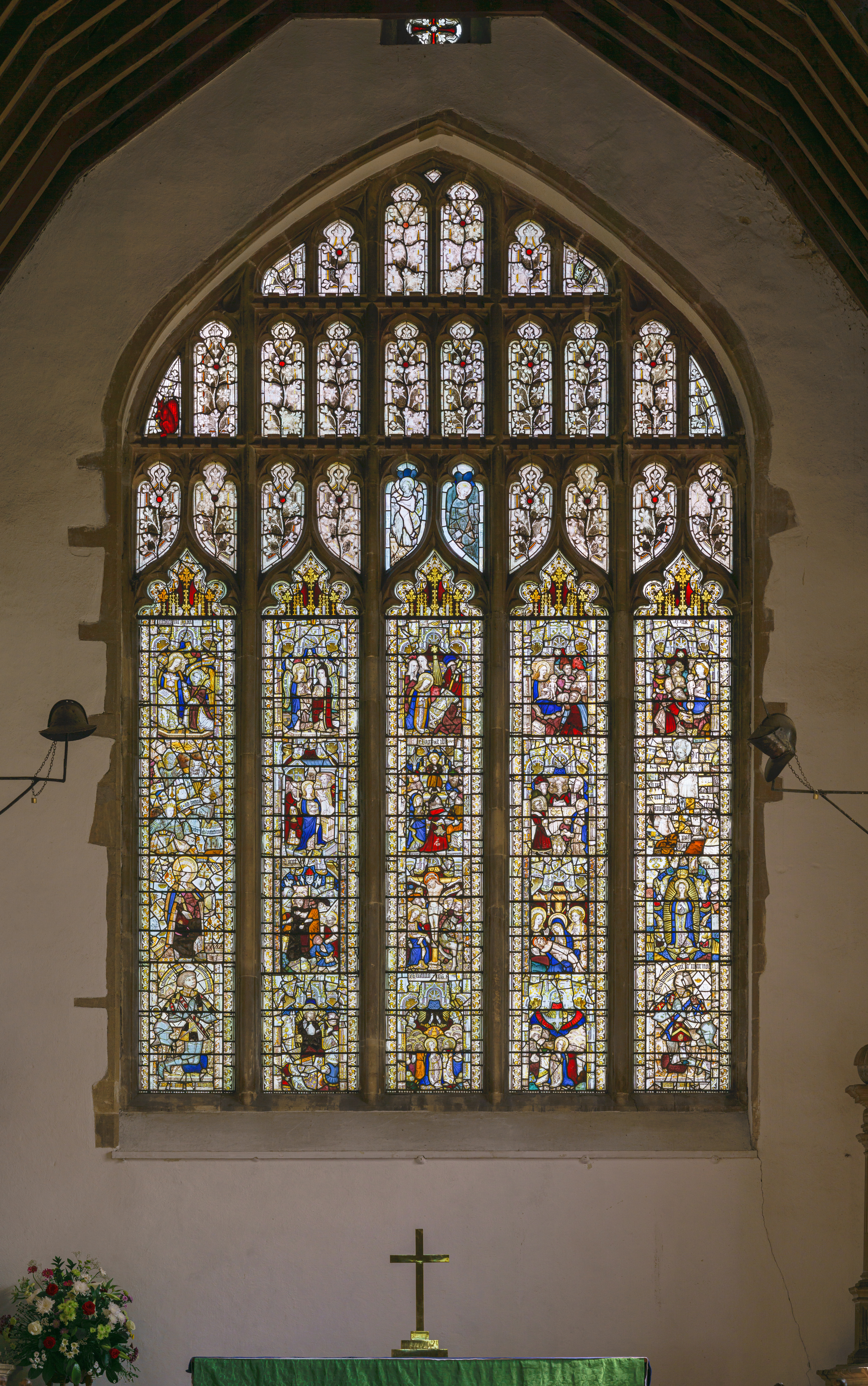
East window

The mediaeval stained glass east window dates largely from the middle fifteenth century, with the top lights containing foliage patterns from the nineteenth century. Twenty main panels in total with 16 depicting scenes from the Joyful, Sorrowful and Glorious Mysteries of Mary, two contain fragments, and two depict donors.

Main panels
Annunciation	Visitation	Nativity	Adoration of the Shepherds	Adoration of the Magi
Fragments	Presentation in the Temple	Finding in the Temple	Wedding at Cana	Fragments
Mary of Magdala	The Betrayal at Gethsemane	Crucifixion	Descent from the Cross	Assumption of Mary
Sir Robert Wingfield; Anne Harling's 2nd husband, d.1480	Resurrection of Jesus	Ascension of Jesus	Descent of the Holy Spirit	Sir William Chamberlain; Anne Harling's 1st husband, d.1462

The windows panels have twice been removed from the church. First, to East Harling Hall in the 1640s, possibly to avoid being destroyed by the Puritans. Second, for protection during World War II. Some elements have been incorporated from windows previously elsewhere in the church: the two angels in the upper centre and the red squirrel in the very top left. The red squirrel is from the arms of the Lovell family and appears in many locations in the church (and in the Holbein painting of Anne Lovell Portrait of a Lady with a Squirrel and a Starling).
