= Rockland, West Virginia =

Rockland is the name of several communities in the U.S. state of West Virginia.

- Rockland, Greenbrier County, West Virginia
- Rockland, Hardy County, West Virginia
