= Portrait of a Lady with a Squirrel and a Starling =

Painting by Hans Holbein the Younger

- Artist: Hans Holbein the Younger
- Year: c. 1526–1528
- Medium: Oil on oak
- Dimensions: 56 cm × 38.8 cm (22 in × 15.3 in)
- Location: National Gallery; London

Portrait of a Lady with a Squirrel and a Starling is an oil-on-oak portrait completed in around 1526–1528 by German Renaissance painter Hans Holbein the Younger. The painting shows a demurely dressed young woman sitting against a plain blue background and holding in her lap a squirrel on a chain eating a nut; a starling sits on a grape vine (Vitis vinifera) in the background with its beak pointing at her right ear. The grape, a Biblical motif, for Holbein was a symbol of abundance and wealth. The subject of this portrait is believed to be Anne Lovell, wife of Sir Francis Lovell (d. 1551), an Esquire of the Body to Henry VIII.

Holbein painted the portrait during his first visit to England, which lasted from summer 1526 to summer 1528. David J. King suggests it might have been done in winter, since the sitter wears a warm fur hat. During this first stay, Holbein worked largely for the circle of Thomas More and his connections: his drawing of More's ward Margaret Giggs shows her wearing the same type of hat. Holbein also painted portraits of Sir Henry Guildford and Mary, Lady Guildford, with similar decorative foliage in the background.

At this stage of his career, Holbein often adapted such designs from pattern books; in his last decade he set his portrait subjects against plain backgrounds in a more iconic style. Art historian John Rowlands judges this painting "the most charming of the portraits from Holbein's first stay in England".

== Identification ==
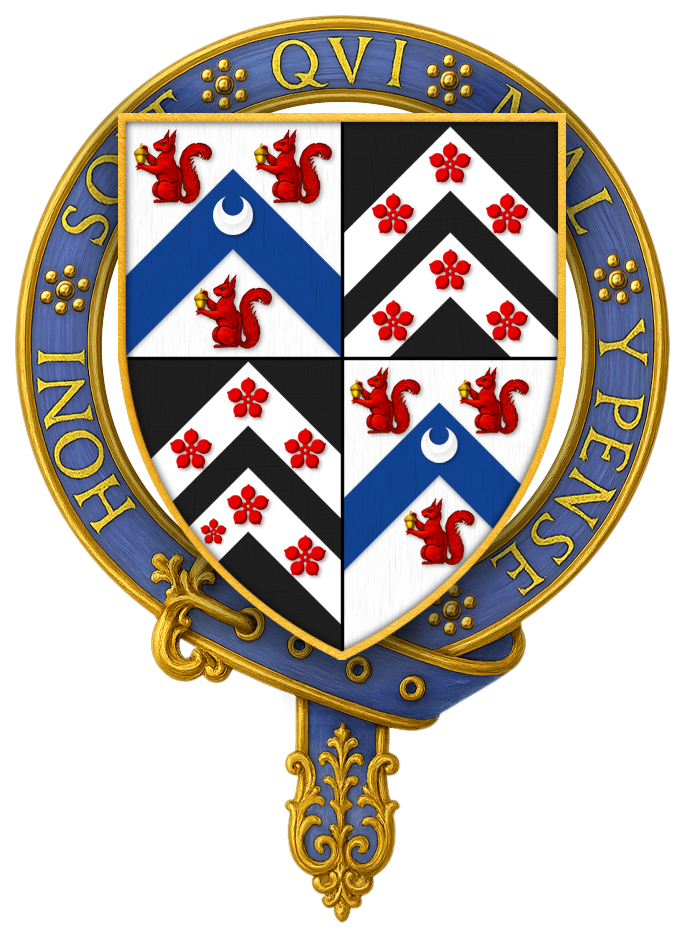
Coat of arms of Sir Thomas Lovell, KG which include red squirrels

The evidence for the identification of the sitter as Anne Lovell was uncovered by stained-glass historian David J. King while studying the windows of the parish church in East Harling, Norfolk, the Lovell family's seat. King noted the Lovell family's coat of arms in the stained glass which included squirrels. The starling can be seen to represent by a pun the place where the sitter lived which was commonly spelled 'Estharlyng' at the time.

Anne (née Ashby) was the wife of the Norfolk landowner Sir Francis Lovell. He was nephew and heir of Sir Thomas Lovell, who fought at the Battle of Bosworth Field. Thomas served as Speaker of the House of Commons, Secretary to the Treasury and Chancellor of the Exchequer.

== Ownership ==
The portrait was at Houghton Hall from 1761 but was bought by the National Gallery in 1992 with contributions from the National Heritage Memorial Fund, the Art Fund and J. Paul Getty Jnr (through the American Friends of the National Gallery, London).

== See also ==
- List of paintings by Hans Holbein the Younger
