= Grade I listed buildings in Great Yarmouth =

There are over 9,000 Grade I listed buildings in England. This page is a list of these buildings in the district of Great Yarmouth in Norfolk.

== Great Yarmouth ==
| Name | Location | Type | Completed (Note: The date given is the date used by Historic England as significant for the initial building or that of an important part in the structure's description.) | Date designated | Grid ref. (Note: The grid reference is based on the British national grid reference system, sometimes known as OSGB36, used by the Ordnance Survey.) Geo-coordinates | Entry number (Note: The "List Entry Number" is a unique number assigned to each listed building and scheduled monument by Historic England.) | Image |
|---|---|---|---|---|---|---|---|
| Gariannonum Roman Fort | Burgh Castle, Great Yarmouth | Roman fort | 260-280 A.D. | 10 June 1953 | TG4749704474; 52°34′54″N 1°39′07″E | 1372902 | Gariannonum Roman Fort More images |
| St Olave's Priory | Fritton and St. Olaves | Priory | 1825-1902 | 27 November 1954 | TM4586099544; 52°32′18″N 1°37′27″E | 1172374 | St Olave's Priory More images |
| Barn at Hall Farm | Hemsby | Farmhouse | 18th century | 4 December 1987 | TG4874216799; 52°41′30″N 1°40′46″E | 1216597 | Barn at Hall Farm |
| Church of St Mary | Martham | Parish Church | Late 14th century | 25 September 1962 | TG4549718442; 52°42′29″N 1°37′58″E | 1152351 | Church of St Mary More images |
| Caister Castle | West Caister | Castle | Late 14th century or early 15th century | 25 September 1962 | TG5044412291; 52°39′02″N 1°42′04″E | 1287573 | Caister Castle More images |
| Church of Holy Trinity and All Saints | Winterton-on-Sea | Church | 13th century | 25 September 1962 | TG4912219463; 52°42′56″N 1°41′13″E | 1216611 | Church of Holy Trinity and All Saints More images |
| Fishermen's Hospital including Gate Piers and Railings | Great Yarmouth | Hospital | 1702 | 27 June 1953 | TG5244907890; 52°36′36″N 1°43′38″E | 1096820 | Fishermen's Hospital including Gate Piers and Railings More images |
| Nelson Monument | Great Yarmouth | Commemorative Monument | 1817-1819 | 27 June 1953 | TG5299905508; 52°35′18″N 1°44′01″E | 1246057 | Nelson Monument More images |
| Remains of the Church of the Greyfriars | Great Yarmouth | Ruins | After 1538 | 27 June 1953 | TG5240307330; 52°36′18″N 1°43′34″E | 1245915 | Remains of the Church of the Greyfriars More images |
| St Georges Theatre | Great Yarmouth | Church/Theatre | 1974-1979 | 27 June 1953 | TG5261207348; 52°36′18″N 1°43′46″E | 1245919 | St Georges Theatre More images |
| St Nicholas (priory) Middle School | Great Yarmouth | Museum | Late 19th century | 27 June 1953 | TG5247907871; 52°36′36″N 1°43′40″E | 1245978 | St Nicholas (priory) Middle School More images |
| The Tolhouse | Great Yarmouth | Toll House | Before restoration | 27 June 1953 | TG5249607253; 52°36′16″N 1°43′39″E | 1245560 | The Tolhouse More images |
| 4 South Quay | Great Yarmouth | House | 1596 | 27 June 1953 | TG5235207360; 52°36′19″N 1°43′32″E | 1271611 | 4 South Quay More images |
