= Indian God Rock =

- Indian God Rock Petroglyphs Site (36VE26)
- U.S. National Register of Historic Places
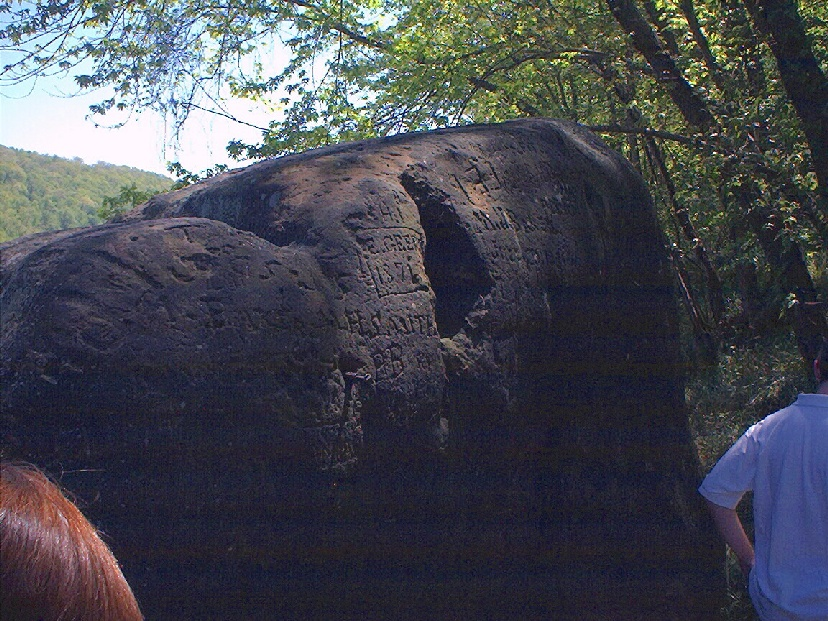
- Rear of Indian God Rock

- Location within Pennsylvania Location within the United States
- Location: Southern side of the Allegheny River, Rockland Township, Venango County, Pennsylvania, United States
- Nearest city: Brandon
- Coordinates: 41°19′48″N 79°49′27″W
- Area: 0.1 acres (0.040 ha)
- Built: 1200
- NRHP reference No.: 84003585
- Added to NRHP: May 14, 1984

Indian God Rock is a large boulder in the northwestern part of the U.S. state of Pennsylvania. Located near the unincorporated community of Brandon, it lies along the Allegheny River in Venango County's Rockland Township. It is significant for the large petroglyph on one of its sides. Because of the petroglyph, the rock has been an explorers' landmark, a tourist attraction, and an object of scholarly investigation.

== Geology ==
One of many large boulders lining the banks of the Allegheny River in Venango County, Indian God Rock is composed of sandstone and measures approximately 22×14×10 feet, or 7×4×4 meters by another measurement. As sandstone is an easy material to carve, the rock was an ideal surface for the creation of rock art.

== Early history ==
Among the fifty-five different figures present on Indian God Rock include geometric shapes and depictions of humans and animals in a range of positions. Two of the carvings appear to be images of archers; these two figures are the only known representations of archers in the Native American rock art of the Ohio River valley. One scholar has held that the resemblance between certain figures on the rock and drawings on extant birch bark scrolls indicates that the rock was used by tribal shamans, and he proposes that the rarity of martial themes among the carvings indicates that the carvers were members of a peaceful culture. Indian God Rock is not the only petroglyph site in Rockland Township; another, known as the "Rainbow Rocks Petroglyphs Site," is located at a significantly higher altitude near the community of Van, approximately 7.5 miles (12.1 km) to the east.

The date of the petroglyph is uncertain; it is believed to have been carved at some point after AD 900, but most likely after 1200. The terminus ante quem for its creation is 1749, when it was recorded by multiple members of a French expedition along the Allegheny. At this time, the rock was plainly invested with religious meaning; according to one member of the expedition, accompanying Native American guides "regarded the rock with superstitious reverence." Besides recording the rock and their disdain for the "savages" who created it, the expedition placed two lead plates at the site as evidence of their presence. During the nineteenth century, Indian God Rock became a popular tourist attraction — steamships on the Allegheny would often stop to allow their passengers to examine the petroglyph.

== Modern history ==
External videos
- Weird Engravings of Indian God Rock - Petroglyphs Of Pennsylvania, Phenomenal Travel Videos

=== Deterioration ===
In recent decades, the Indian God Rock has suffered significantly from erosion and vandalism. Since the nineteenth century, visitors have cut their names into the rock, and recent years have seen the use of spray paint by some individuals. Although archaeologists have highlighted the carvings in the past, the figures are now somewhat difficult to see.

=== Recognition ===
In the twentieth century, Indian God Rock became the object of significant archaeological investigation for the information potential of its carvings. Its place as the first Ohio River valley petroglyph to appear in written records and the continued scholarly attention to its carvings has caused it to be seen as the premier example of monumental rock art in its region. The United States Forest Service has recognized the rock as one of the most significant of the seventy-five Native American archaeological sites in the portion of the Allegheny River that has been designated a National Wild and Scenic River. In 1984, it was further recognized when the National Park Service added it to the National Register of Historic Places.

=== Accessibility ===
In 1982, the rock lay on the right-of-way for a railroad line operated by the Conrail. Today, the rail line is closed; instead, the Middle Allegheny River Water Trail passes near the rock, and hikers can view the rock from a lookout along the trail. As in the nineteenth century, Indian God Rock is also visible from watercraft on the Allegheny River.

== See also ==
- List of Native American archaeological sites on the National Register of Historic Places in Pennsylvania
- List of individual rocks
