= Rockland Township, Pennsylvania =

Rockland Township is the name of some places in the U.S. state of Pennsylvania:

- Rockland Township, Berks County, Pennsylvania
- Rockland Township, Venango County, Pennsylvania
