= Henry William Evans =

English athlete, rugby player and surgeon

Dr. Henry William Evans MC (1890 – 25 October 1927) was an English athlete, Rugby player and surgeon. As a medical student he emerged as a leading sprinter and was selected for the 1912 Stockholm Olympic Games, an invitation he was compelled to decline. As a physician he served in the First World War and was awarded the Military Cross for action during the Battle of the Somme.

== Early life and education ==
Evans was born in 1890 in Bedford, England and was educated at Bedford Modern School and Guy's Hospital. He graduated MRCS and LRCP in 1913, and obtained his M.B. and B.Sc. the following year.

As a schoolboy he emerged as a talented runner and won the 100 yards at the Public Schools Athletics at Stamford Bridge in 1908, and as a student his successes continued in the 100 yards and 200 yards in the Inter-Hospital Sports between 1909-1911. Evans joined the Artists Rifles Volunteer Corps whilst he was at Guy's and won the Territorial Army 100 yards in 1911. As a result of these successes he was selected as a sprinter in the British Team for the 1912 Summer Olympics but was unable to take up his place because of the pressures of work. Evans was also an excellent Rugby player for Bedford, Guy's Hospital RFC and the East Midlands.

== War ==
Henry Evans was commissioned into the Royal Army Medical Corps in 1914 and was sent to France the following year. During the Battle of the Somme he lost contact with his battalion and spent two days on the battlefield with his ambulance company continuing to treat the wounded. For this he was awarded the Military Cross. He was injured in 1917 but returned to serve in Egypt and Palestine from 1918-1919.

== Later life ==
After the War he returned to Guy's as resident obstetrician and proceeded to the Degree of MD in 1920. In 1921 he entered General Practice at Brundall, Norfolk. According to one of his colleagues, Evans was "gifted with sympathy tempered by a keen sense of humour, and with emotions controlled by sound judgement. He was deeply loved by all who knew him, and won the affection and confidence of his many patients, rich and poor alike." In 1927 he contracted influenza and this developed into pneumonia and he died on 25 October. He left a wife and two young children.
