= Rockland Furnace =

- U.S. National Register of Historic Places
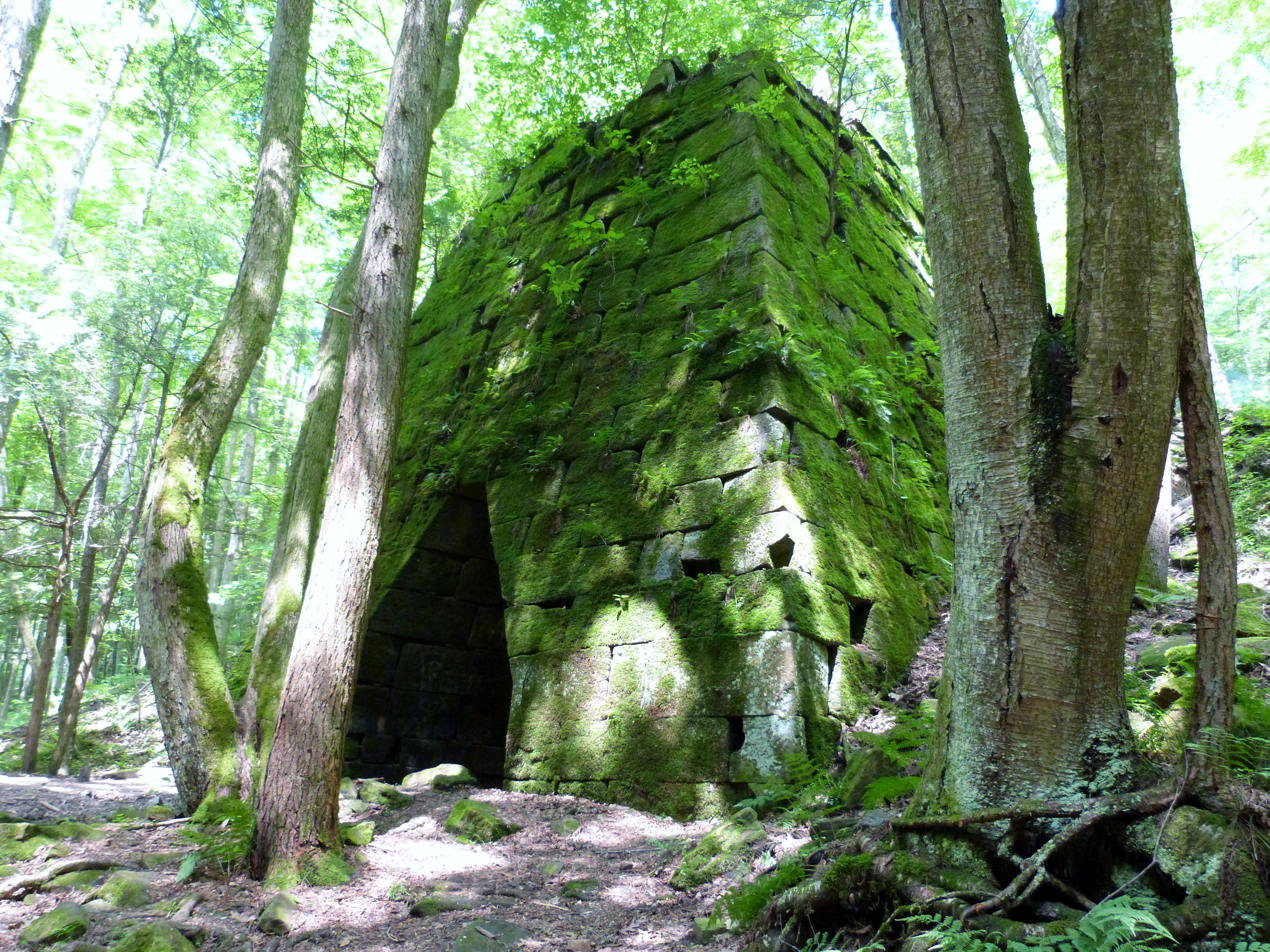

- Location within Pennsylvania Location within the United States
- Location: On Shull Run north of the Allegheny River, northwest of Emlenton, Rockland Township, Pennsylvania
- Coordinates: 41°14′3″N 79°44′57″W
- Area: less than one acre
- Built: 1832
- Architectural style: Iron furnace
- MPS: Iron and Steel Resources of Pennsylvania MPS
- NRHP reference No.: 91001139
- Added to NRHP: September 6, 1991

Rockland Furnace is a historic iron furnace located at Rockland Township, Venango County, Pennsylvania. It was built 1832, and is a stone structure approximately 25 feet tall. It has an 11 feet wide, 10 feet tall casting arch and 9 feet wide, 9 feet tall tuyere arch. Also on the property are the wheel pit and mill race.

It was listed on the National Register of Historic Places in 1991.
