= John Carter (cricketer, born 1963) =

English cricketer

Personal information
- Full name: John Ronald Carter
- Born: 9 August 1963 (age 63); Brundall, Norfolk, England
- Batting: Right-handed

Domestic team information
- Years: Team
- 1984–1987: Norfolk

Career statistics
Competition	List A
Matches	1
Runs scored	8
Batting average	8.00
100s/50s	0/0
Top score	8
Catches/stumpings	0/–
- Source: Cricinfo, 29 June 2011

John Ronald Carter (born 9 August 1963) is an English former cricketer. He was a right-handed batsman. He was born in Brundall, Norfolk.

Carter made his debut for Norfolk County Cricket Club in the 1984 Minor Counties Championship against Northumberland. He played Minor counties cricket for Norfolk from 1984 to 1987, which included 17 Minor Counties Championship matches and 7 MCCA Knockout Trophy matches. He made his only List A appearance in 1985 against Leicestershire in the NatWest Trophy. In this match, he was dismissed for 8 runs by Paddy Clift.
