= Beighton, Norfolk =

Village and civil parish in the Broadland district of Norfolk, England

Coordinates: 52.615°N 1.516°E

Beighton
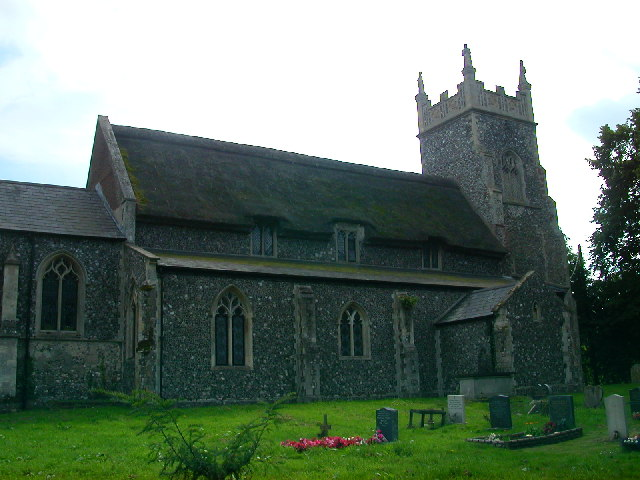
- All Saints Church, Beighton

- Location within Norfolk
- Area: 7.63 km^{2} (2.95 sq mi)
- Population: 436 (2011)
  - Density: 57/km^{2} (150/sq mi)
- OS grid reference: TG385080
- Civil parish: Beighton
- District: Broadland
- Shire county: Norfolk
- Region: East
- Country: England
- Sovereign state: United Kingdom
- Post town: NORWICH
- Postcode district: NR13
- Dialling code: 01493
- Police: Norfolk
- Fire: Norfolk
- Ambulance: East of England

Beighton /ˈbaɪtən/ is a village and civil parish in the Broadland district of Norfolk, England, about 2 miles (3.2 km) south-west of Acle and 13 miles (21 km) east of Norwich. It covers an area of 7.63 square kilometres (2.95 sq mi) and in 2011 had a population of 436 in 185 households. Today, Beighton incorporates the old parish of Moulton St Mary; both parishes are mentioned in the Domesday Book of 1086.

== History ==
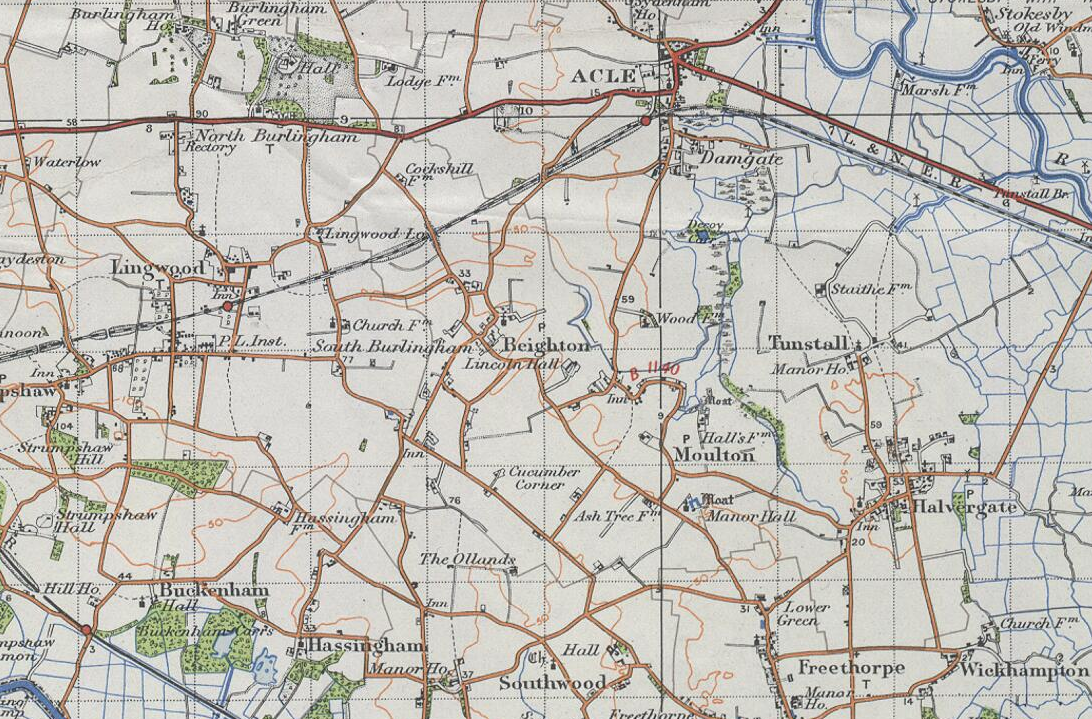
A map image of Beighton Civil Parish, Norfolk, as reported by the Ordnance Survey 1945

The name of the village was first recorded as Begetuna in 1086. From 1850 till 1910 there was a rapid decline in population in the village, although it grew in the 20th century to 436 at the 2011 census.

=== Church of All Saints ===
The parish church dates from the 13th century. It is built of flint and stone dressing and was restored in the 19th-century, with rebuilding of the north aisle and the upper parts of the tower. Restoration also included the addition of a number of stained glass windows. The building is a grade I listed building.

=== Church of St Mary ===
A grade I listed building, St Mary's was the parish church of Moulton and was built in the 13th century. It consists of nave, chancel, south porch and round tower.

== Notable people ==
- Edward Fellowes (1845–1896), cricketer
