= Fishermen's Hospital =

Building in Great Yarmouth, Norfolk, England

Coordinates: 52°36′36″N 1°43′39″E

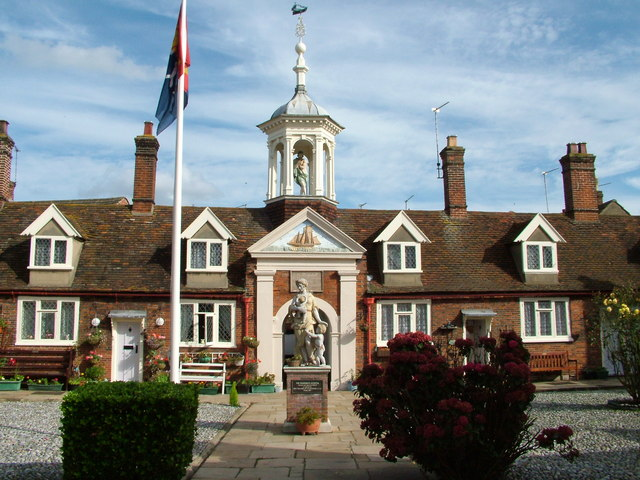

The Fishermen's Hospital is a Grade I listed building in Great Yarmouth, Norfolk, England. It was established by the Corporation of Great Yarmouth in 1702 to look after 20 old and decayed fishermen and their wives.
