= Banham, Norfolk =

Village in Norfolk, England

Coordinates: 52.451°N 1.037°E

Banham
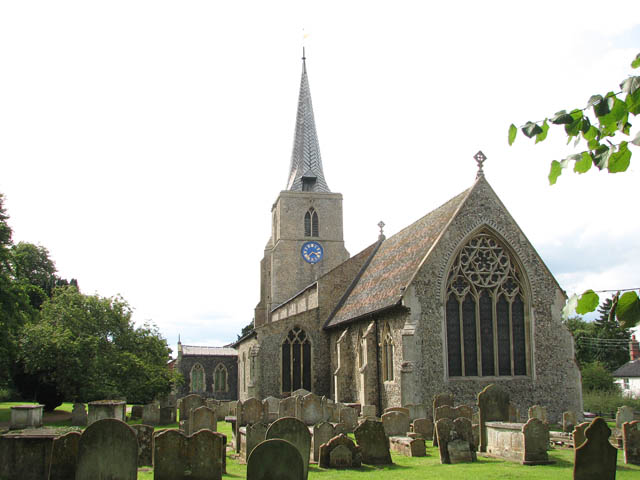
- St Mary The Virgin, Banham

- Location within Norfolk
- Area: 16.17 km^{2} (6.24 sq mi)
- Population: 1,481 (2011)
  - Density: 92/km^{2} (240/sq mi)
- OS grid reference: TM065880
- Civil parish: Banham
- District: Breckland
- Shire county: Norfolk
- Region: East
- Country: England
- Sovereign state: United Kingdom
- Post town: NORWICH
- Postcode district: NR16
- Dialling code: 01953
- Police: Norfolk
- Fire: Norfolk
- Ambulance: East of England
- UK Parliament: South West Norfolk

Banham is an English village and civil parish in the county of Norfolk, about 7 miles (11 km) north-west of Diss, 12 miles (19 km) east of Thetford and 20 miles (32 km) south-west of Norwich. It is home to Banham Zoo, a private collection open to the public for more than 40 years, which houses over 2,000 animals. The Church of England parish church, dedicated to St Mary the Virgin, is a Grade I listed building.

== Etymology ==
The name of the village derives from "Bean homestead/village", or perhaps "hemmed-in land where beans grow".

== Population and governance ==
The civil parish has an area of 16.17 square kilometres (6.24 sq mi) and in the 2001 census had a population of 1,443 in 573 households, including for census purposes the neighbouring village of Fersfield some distance to the south. This increased to a population of 1,481 in 603 households at the 2011 Census. For local government, the parish lies in the district of Breckland. Since 2015, the parish has formed part of The Buckenhams and Banham ward, which returns one councillor to the district council.

== Schools ==
Acorn Park School is a registered children's home and school for children and young people with autistic spectrum disorders and is part of the Acorn Care and Education Group.

Banham Marshalls College, an independent school in the village, was subject to Norfolk's biggest ever child-cruelty investigation, along with another school in Banham, The Old Rectory School. As a result of the investigation into the schools, which were for children with special needs and ostensibly specialised in Emotional and Behavioural Disorders, George Robson, the proprietor of both and former head teacher received a two-year suspended prison sentence. Robson died the day after his sentencing. Two other former members of staff was also convicted.

Banham Marshalls College was closed by the Department of Education in 2003. The site is now occupied by Acorn Park School.

== Notable people ==
The village was the birthplace in 1795 of the schoolteacher, writer, poet, and hymn writer Emily Taylor.

The Rev. Edward Thomas Daniell of the Norwich School of painters, a talented amateur etcher and painter, was curate of St Mary's for 18 months, from 1832.

== Bibliography ==
- Dickes, William Frederick (1905). The Norwich school of painting: being a full account of the Norwich exhibitions, the lives of the painters, the lists of their respective exhibits and descriptions of the pictures. Norwich: Jarrold & Sons Ltd. OCLC 558218061.
