= Church of St Margaret, Breckles =

Church in Breckles, Norfolk, England

Coordinates: 52.5139°N 0.8847°E

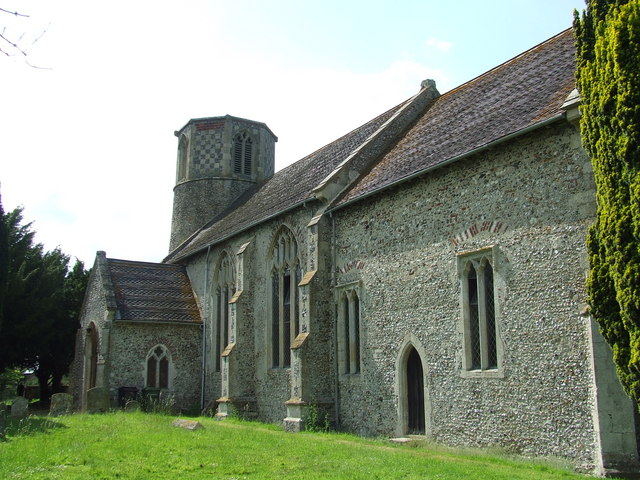
Breckles St Margaret

The church of Breckles St Margaret is an Anglican church near Stow Bedon, Norfolk, England. It is one of 124 existent round-tower churches in Norfolk. The church is an active parish church in the Diocese of Norwich. It has been designated a Grade I listed building by English Heritage.
