= St Mary the Virgin, Banham =

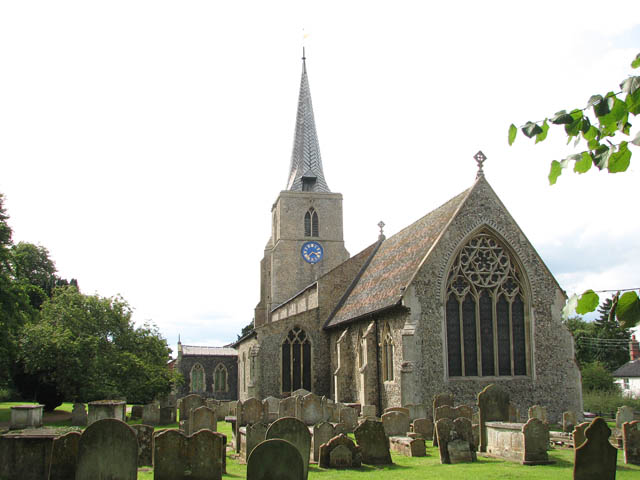
- St Mary the Virgin, Banham
- St Mary the Virgin, Banham
- 52°27′11″N 1°02′07″E
- Location: Banham
- Country: England
- Denomination: Church of England

History
- Dedication: St Mary the Virgin

Architecture
- Heritage designation: Grade I listed

St Mary the Virgin Church, Banham is a Grade I listed Church of England parish church in Banham, Norfolk.

The basic material of the building is the natural flint of the area, and as is usual with Norfolk churches, white freestone was sparingly used for windows and framing because it had to be brought laboriously from quarries in Northamptonshire.
