= Moulton St Mary =

Coordinates: 52.60°N 01.52°E

- Village
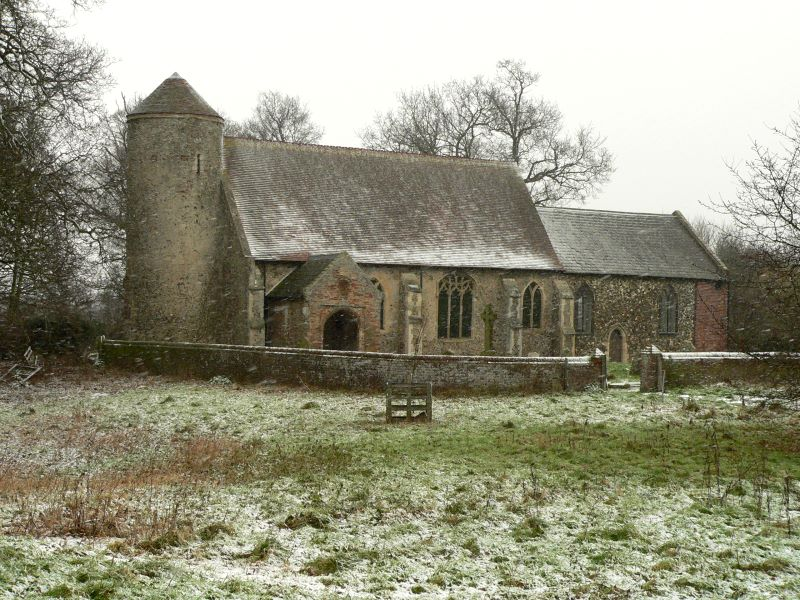
- Moulton St Mary church

- Location within Norfolk
- Civil parish: Beighton
- District: Broadland
- Shire county: Norfolk
- Region: East
- Country: England
- Sovereign state: United Kingdom
- Post town: NORWICH
- Postcode district: NR13
- Dialling code: 01493
- UK Parliament: Broadland and Fakenham

Moulton St Mary is a village in the civil parish of Beighton, in the Broadland district of Norfolk, England. It is about 2 miles (3.2 km) south of Acle. The village has a garden centre and a car garage.

Its Church of St Mary is one of 124 existing round-tower churches in Norfolk. It has a canonical sundial on the south wall. The church is redundant and under the care of the Churches Conservation Trust.

== History ==
The villages name origin is uncertain, deriving either from "Mula's farm/settlement" or "mule farm/settlement". In 1931 the parish had a population of 228. On 1 April 1935 the parish was abolished and merged with Beighton and Reedham.
