= Stow Bedon =

Village in Norfolk, England

Coordinates: 52.527°N 0.881°E

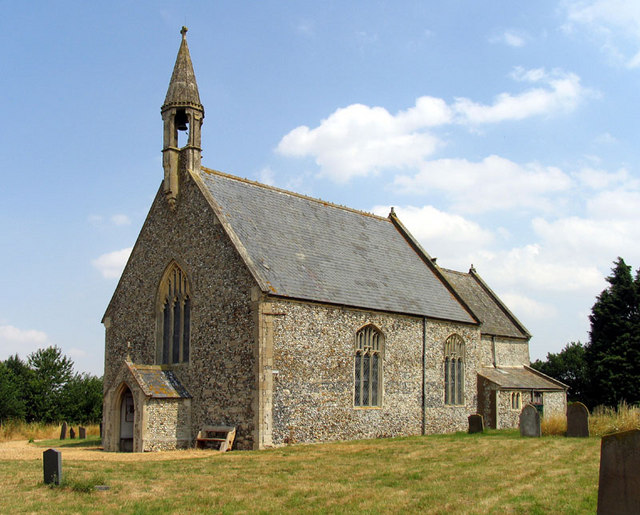
- St Botolph, Stow Bedon

- Location within Norfolk
- Area: 13.68 km^{2} (5.28 sq mi)
- Population: 290 (2011 census)
  - Density: 21/km^{2} (54/sq mi)
- OS grid reference: TL955963
- Civil parish: Stow Bedon and Breckles
- District: Breckland
- Shire county: Norfolk
- Region: East
- Country: England
- Sovereign state: United Kingdom
- Post town: ATTLEBOROUGH
- Postcode district: NR17
- Dialling code: 01953
- Police: Norfolk
- Fire: Norfolk
- Ambulance: East of England
- UK Parliament: South West Norfolk

Stow Bedon Inclosure Act 1813
- Act of Parliament
- Parliament of the United Kingdom
- Long title: An Act for inclosing Lands in the Parish of Stow Bedon, in the County of Norfolk.
- Citation: 53 Geo. 3. c. lvii

Dates
- Royal assent: 15 April 1813

Text of statute as originally enacted

Stow Bedon /ˌstoʊ ˈbɛdən/ is a village and former civil parish in the Breckland district, in the English county of Norfolk. It is 4 miles (6.4 km) south-east of Watton, 9 miles (14 km) north-east of Thetford and 19 miles (31 km) south-west of Norwich. The parish was combined with Breckles to form the parish of Stow Bedon and Breckles and includes the hamlet of Lower Stow Bedon. In 2011 the merged parish had a population of 290.

The A1075 road passes through the parish. The parish is 13.68 square kilometres (5.28 sq mi) and extends as far as the edge of the Stanford Training Area in the west.

The Domesday Book of 1086 mentions both Stow Bedon together with neighbouring Caston and Breckles. The village was held by John di Bidun in the 13th century. An inclosure act of 1813 mentions Stow Bedon as a "Free Village" and mentions how the village "maintained an independent spirit". Kelly's Directory for 1883 records that Stow Bedon had a population of 324 with a total of 35 dwellings.

The village church dates from the 14th century and is dedicated to St Botolph; it is a Grade II* listed building. The south and west of the area is a separate ecclesiastical parish, and its church, St Margaret's at Breckles, is Grade I listed.

A station at Stow Bedon, on the Thetford & Watton Railway, opened in October 1869 and closed with the line in June 1964. The Great Eastern Pingo Trail, a 13 kilometres (8.1 mi) circular walk, starts and finishes in the parish. The village fete is held annually in June, and St Botolph's church holds a flower festival.

== Governance ==
On 1 April 1935 the parish of Breckles was merged with Stow Bedon. The merged parish is now called "Stow Bedon and Breckles". In 1931 the parish (prior to the merge) had a population of 245.
