= Rockland, Greenbrier County, West Virginia =

- Unincorporated community
- Location within West Virginia Location within the United States
- Coordinates: 37°43′46″N 80°30′46″W
- Country: United States
- State: West Virginia
- County: Greenbrier
- Elevation: 1,667 ft (508 m)
- Time zone: UTC-5 (Eastern (EST))
  - Summer (DST): UTC-4 (EDT)
- Area codes: 304 & 681
- GNIS feature ID: 1555504

Rockland is an unincorporated community in Greenbrier County, West Virginia, United States. Rockland is located on the Greenbrier River, 3 miles (4.8 km) southwest of Ronceverte.
