= Great Yarmouth Grey Friary =

Friary in Great Yarmouth, Norfolk, England

Coordinates: 52.6051°N 1.7262°E

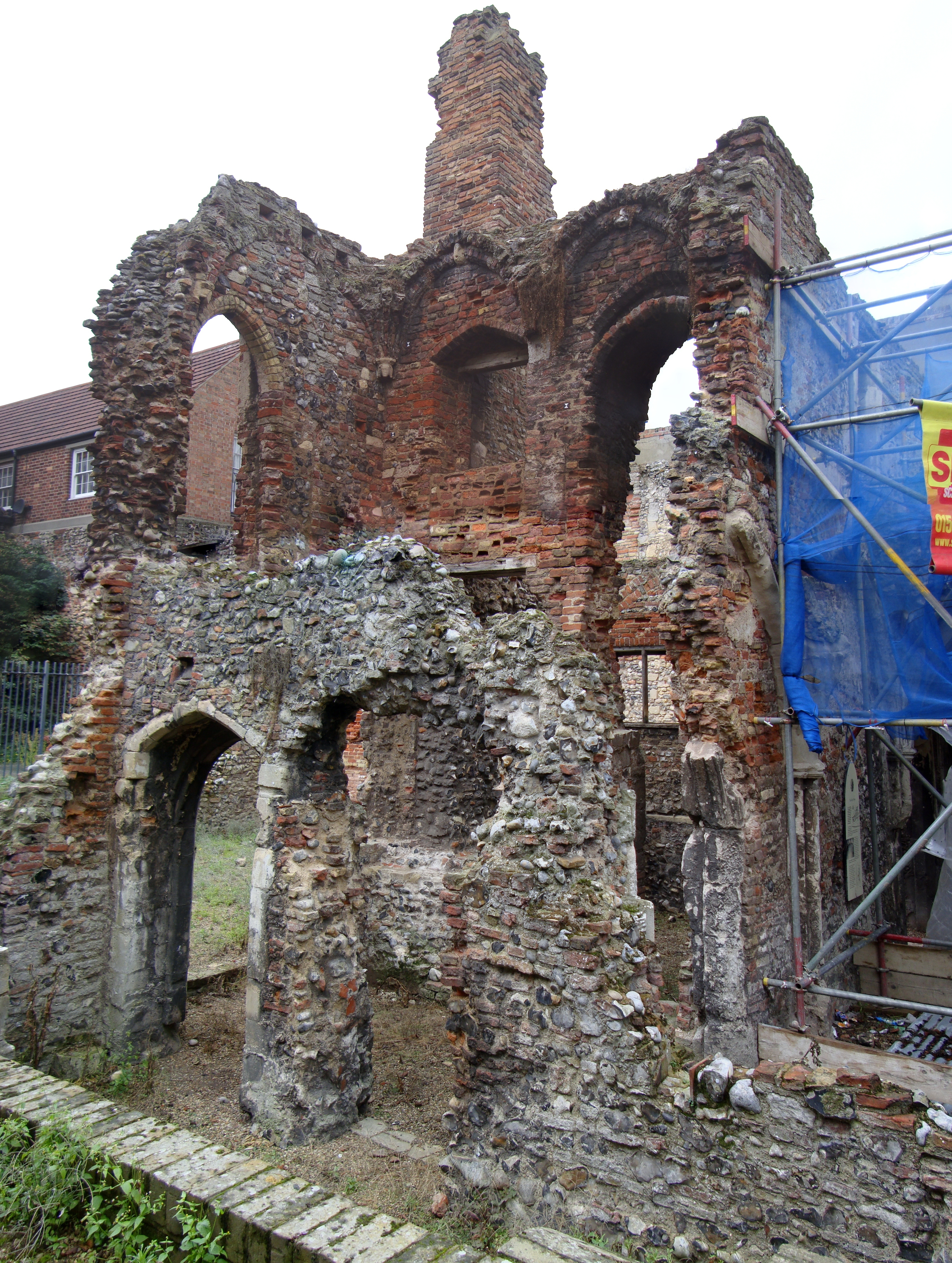
The remains of Greyfriars in Great Yarmouth

Great Yarmouth Grey Friary was a Franciscan monastic house in Great Yarmouth, Norfolk, England which was under the Custody of Cambridge.

The monastery was founded c.1226 by Sir William Garbridge, enlarged in 1285 and 1290, and dissolved in 1538 as part of the Dissolution of the Monasteries under King Henry VIII. It was then granted to Richard Williams (alias Cromwell), in 1541/2, leased in 1582 as a lodging for important visitors, and part used by local civilian militia. The site was sold to John Woodroffe in 1657, later divided and sold and the monastic remains incorporated into 17th century and later buildings. The remains of the cloister were opened up in the late 19th century, with other remains restored in 1945 and thereafter.

The ruins, comprising the west range of the cloisters and fragments of the south wall of the church, are Grade I listed.
