= Edward Fellowes (cricketer) =

English cricketer and clergyman

Personal information
- Full name: Edward Lyon Fellowes
- Born: 23 April 1845; Beighton, Norfolk, England
- Died: 23 July 1896 (aged 51); Papworth Everard, Cambridgeshire, England
- Batting: Right-handed
- Bowling: Right-arm roundarm fast

Domestic team information
- Years: Team
- 1865–1868: Oxford University

Career statistics
Competition	First-class
Matches	17
Runs scored	376
Batting average	18.80
100s/50s	–/2
Top score	56
Balls bowled	2,955
Wickets	85
Bowling average	14.21
5 wickets in innings	6
10 wickets in match	1
Best bowling	7/46
Catches/stumpings	18/–
- Source: Cricinfo, 17 August 2019

Edward Lyon Fellowes (23 April 1845 – 23 July 1896) was an English first-class cricketer and clergyman.

The son of Thomas Lyon Fellowes, he was born in April 1845 at Beighton, Norfolk. He was educated at Marlborough College, before going up to Brasenose College, Oxford. While studying at Oxford, he made his debut in first-class cricket for Oxford University against the Marylebone Cricket Club at Oxford in 1865. He played first-class cricket for Oxford until 1868, making fifteen appearances. Playing as a right-arm roundarm fast bowler, he took 83 wickets for Oxford at an average of 13.34, with best figures of 7 for 46. He took five wickets in a match on six occasions and took ten wickets in a match once. With the bat, he scored 338 runs at a batting average of 18.77 and a high score of 56. He was considered one of the best Oxford bowlers of his time. While at Oxford, he also played for the Gentlemen in the Gentlemen v Players fixture of 1866.

A year after graduating from Oxford, he made a single appearance for the Gentlemen of England against Oxford University. Fellowes became a Church of England clergyman after leaving Oxford, taking holy orders in 1869. He was the curate of Ormesby and Mautby in Norfolk from 1869–74, before becoming the vicar of Cumnor in Berkshire from 1874–76. He transferred to Wimpole in Cambridgeshire later in 1876, briefly becoming the rector there, before becoming the rector of Arrington. He remained the rector of Arrington until his death at Papworth Everard in July 1896.
