= Church of St Michael and All Angels, Braydeston =

Church of St Michael and All Angels
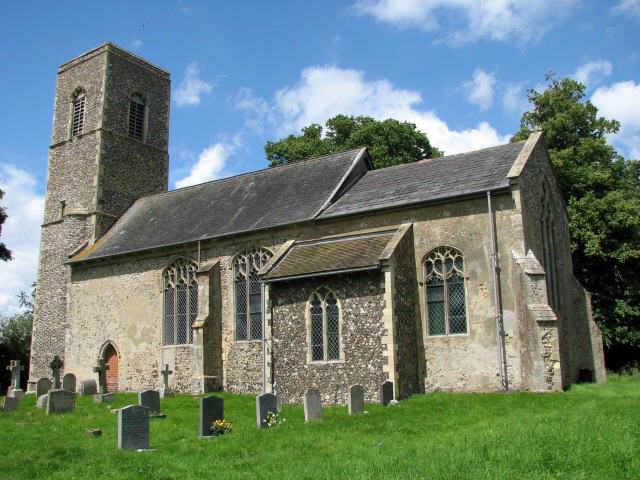
- Church of St Michael and All Angels
- 52°37′32″N 1°27′07″E
- Country: England
- Denomination: Church of England
- Previous denomination: Roman Catholic Church
- Churchmanship: Book of Common Prayer
- Website: Parish website

History
- Status: Active

Architecture
- Functional status: Parish Church
- Heritage designation: Grade I listed
- Designated: 25 September 1962
- Style: Perpendicular Gothic

Administration
- Diocese: Diocese of Norwich
- Archdeaconry: Archdeaconry of Norfolk
- Deanery: Blofield
- Parish: Braydeston

Clergy
- Rector: The Revd Peter Leech

The Church of St Michael and All Angels is a Church of England parish church in Braydeston, Brundall, Norfolk. The church is a Grade I listed building and dates from the 13th century.

== History ==
The church is located in Braydeston, a deserted medieval village to the east of Brundall, Norfolk.

=== Present day ===
On 25 September 1962, the church was designated a Grade I listed building.

This is located with the Benefice of Brundall, Braydeston and Postwick (also known as the Yare Valley Churches) in the Archdeaconry of Norfolk, Diocese of Norwich. The churchyard is still open for burials. The church uses the Book of Common Prayer during its services.
