= Rockland, Wisconsin =

Rockland, Wisconsin may refer to:

- Rockland, Brown County, Wisconsin, a town
- Rockland, La Crosse County, Wisconsin, a village
- Rockland, Manitowoc County, Wisconsin, a town
