= St Mary's Church, Moulton =

Coordinates: 52.6046°N 1.5464°E

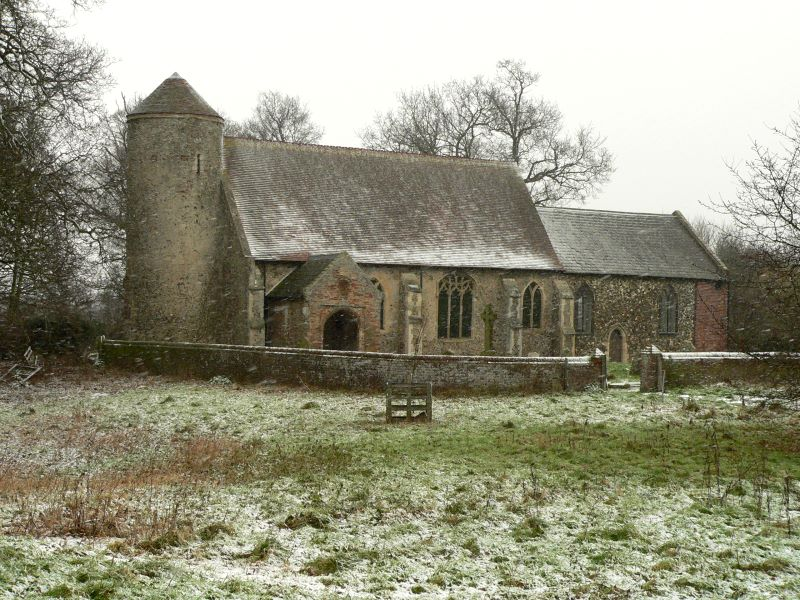
- St Mary's Church, Moulton, from the southwest

- Location in Norfolk
- OS grid reference: TG 403 067
- Location: Moulton St Mary, Norfolk
- Country: England
- Denomination: Anglican
- Website: Churches Conservation Trust

History
- Dedication: Saint Mary

Architecture
- Functional status: Redundant
- Heritage designation: Grade I
- Designated: 25 September 1952
- Architectural type: Church
- Style: Norman, Gothic

Specifications
- Materials: Flint and brick, limestone dressings Roofs tiled and slated

St Mary's Church is a redundant Anglican round-tower church near the village of Moulton St Mary, Norfolk, England. It is recorded in the National Heritage List for England as a designated Grade I listed building, and is under the care of the Churches Conservation Trust. It stands some 4 kilometres (2 mi) to the south of Acle in an isolated position adjacent to a farm.

== History ==
The tower dates from the 12th century, and the nave and chancel from the 14th century. The south porch was added during the 16th century, and the east wall of the chancel was rebuilt during the 1870s.

== Architecture ==
=== Exterior ===
St Mary's is constructed in flint and red brick, with limestone dressings. The tower and nave are tiled, and the chancel and porch are slated. Its plan consists of a nave with a south porch, a chancel, and a west tower. The tower is in Norman style, the nave and most of the chancel are Gothic, the porch is Tudor, and the east wall of the chancel is in Georgian style. The tower is round with a conical roof. It has a slit window high on the south side, on the north side is a louvred bell opening, and on the west side is a blocked two-light Decorated window. The porch has a sundial in the southwest corner, a niche over the doorway, and blocked three-light windows on each side. The south wall of the nave is divided into three bays by stepped buttresses. In the middle bay is a three-light window with Perpendicular tracery. In each of the two lateral bays is a two-light window with Y-tracery. The south wall of the chancel contains two two-light windows and a priest's door. The chancel roof is at a lower level than that of the nave; the east gable of the nave is hung with slates. The east wall of the chancel is brick and contains a three-light window. At the northeast corner of the chancel is a stone and flint buttress. In the north wall of the chancel, and in the eastern bay of the nave, are wide single lancet windows. The other bays of the north wall of the nave contain two- and three-light windows, and a doorway.

=== Interior ===
In the south wall of the chancel is a double piscina and a sedilia. The benches in the chancel date from the 17th century and are carved with poppyheads. The communion rail dates from the same period and is carried on turned balusters and posts. At the southeast corner of the nave are the remains of a former stairway that led to a rood loft. On the wall of the nave are 14th-century wall paintings in relatively good condition. Those on the north wall depict Saint Christopher, and on the south wall are paintings representing the Seven Acts of Mercy. The nave also contains a wall monument to Edmund Anguish who died in 1616. The octagonal pulpit dates from the early 17th century; it is finely carved, and has a backboard and a tester. The font is also octagonal, each face is carved with a pair of blind arches; it dates from the 13th century, and is carried on a central stem and eight shafts.

== List of rectors ==
The following rectors of the church's parish are listed by Francis Blomefield and Charles Parkin in their An essay towards a topographical history of the county of Norfolk:

- 1320: Robert Rowland
- 1325: Ralph de Hakeford
- 1350: Roger de Mondegone
- 1350: Robert de Norton
- 1352: John de Bestharp
- 1361: Adam de Foxler
- 1383: John Wayte
- 1383: John Harvey
- 1383: John Boteler

== List of vicars ==
From 1403, parish priests were appointed as vicars, rather than rectors, the rectory having been appropriated by the Dean of St Mary's College, Norwich, which had owned the benefice since about 1361. The following vicars are listed by Blomefield and Parkin.

- 1403: John Virley
- 1403: John Bawdre
- 1403: John Scoole
- 1420: Thomas Petit
- 1422: John Man
- 1427: William Snelling
- 1427: William Taylor
- 1429: Clement Welle
- 1434: Thomas Alfred
- 1448: Thomas Hanworth
- 1453: John Domlyn
- 1461: John Norwich
- 1461: John Ramton
- 1495: John Rudham
- 1502: Richard Thompson
- 1505: John Frampton
- 1507: Robert Barker
- 1511: Richard Sampson (later Bishop of Chichester and of Lichfield and Coventry)
- 1512: John Rogers
- 1541: John Younge
- 1541: John Ludbury
- 1560: Robert Mourton
- 1574: Roger Beweller
- 1617: Robert Pepys
- 1658: Thomas Essex
- 1668: William Brook
- 1672: Thomas Wilson
- 1699: John Sallet
- 1711: John Pitts
- 1723: Horace Fawcett
- 1726: Thomas Carter
- 1737: Roger Geddings
