= Rockland Township, Venango County, Pennsylvania =

Township in Pennsylvania, US

Coordinates: 41°14′59″N 79°45′15″W

- Township
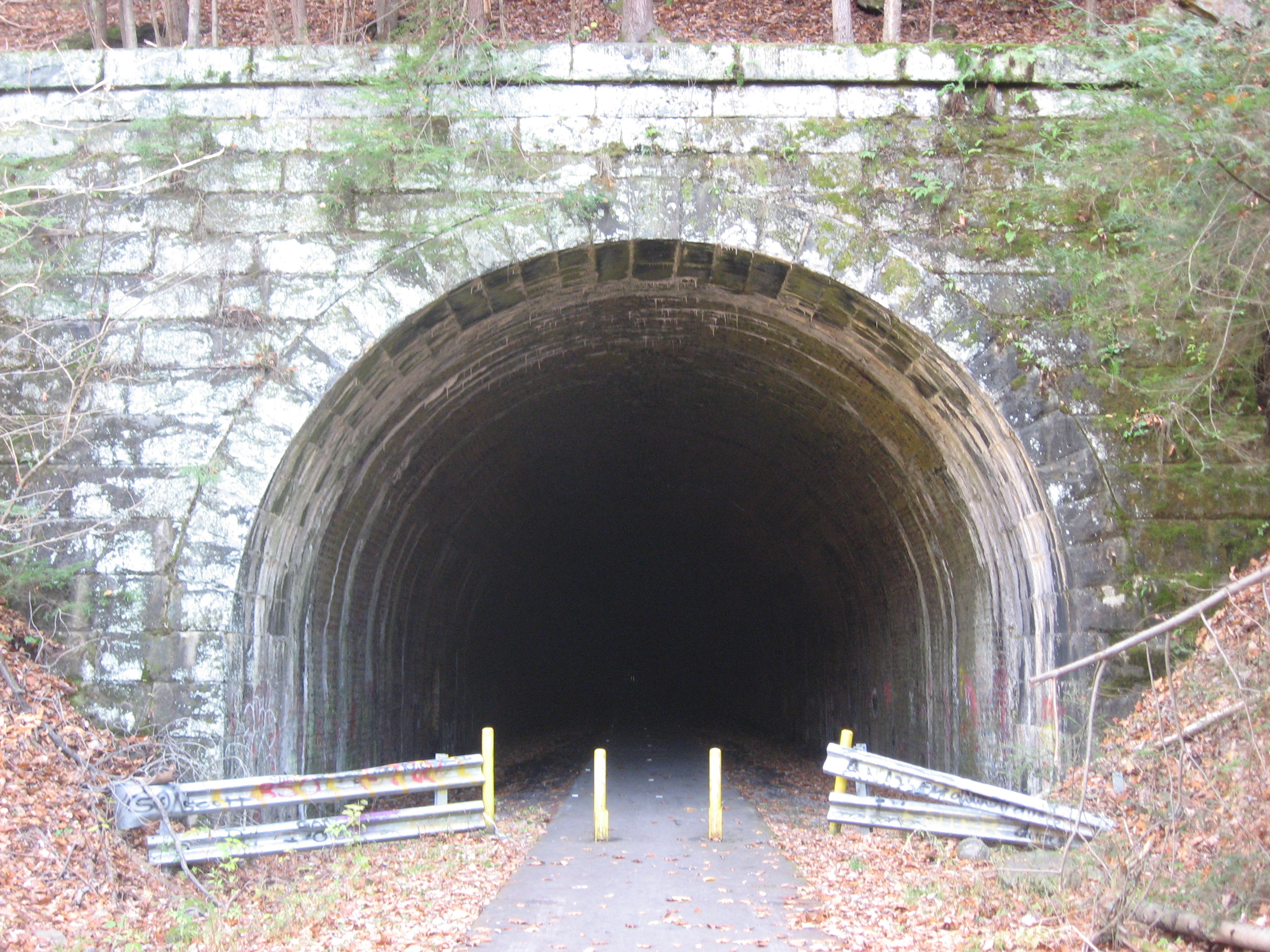
- Rockland Tunnel

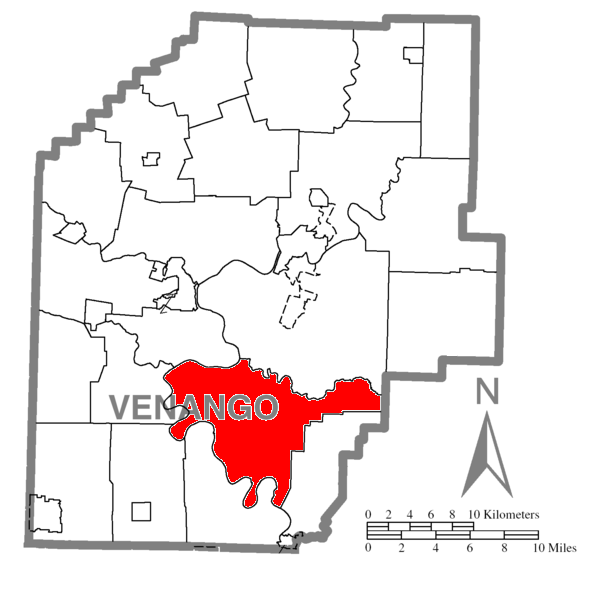
- Map of Venango County, Pennsylvania highlighting Rockland Township

- Map of Venango County, Pennsylvania
- Country: United States
- State: Pennsylvania
- County: Venango
- Settled: 1809
- Incorporated: 1817

Government
  - Type: Board of Supervisors

Area
  - Total: 49.58 sq mi (128.42 km^{2})
  - Land: 49.58 sq mi (128.42 km^{2})
  - Water: 0 sq mi (0.00 km^{2})

Population (2020)
  - Total: 1,244 ▼
  - Estimate (2024): 1,214
  - Density: 28.1/sq mi (10.85/km^{2})
- Time zone: UTC-5 (Eastern (EST))
  - Summer (DST): UTC-4 (EDT)
- Area code: 814
- FIPS code: 42-121-65560

Rockland Township is a township in Venango County, Pennsylvania, United States. The population was 1,244 at the 2020 census. The township is quite remote, containing one general store (which is now closed), a Methodist church, and a volunteer fire department. A place of interest is Freedom Falls, where a waterfall and old iron furnace can be found.

== History ==
A prehistoric petroglyph, the Indian God Rock, is located along the Allegheny River in Rockland Township. Other petroglyphs, known as the "Rainbow Rocks Petroglyphs Site," lie farther east in the township near the community of Van. It is listed on the National Register of Historic Places, along with the Rockland Furnace.

== Geography ==
According to the United States Census Bureau, the township has a total area of 49.7 square miles (128.8 km^{2}), all land. It contains the census-designated place of Kennerdell.

== Demographics ==
Historical population
Census	Pop.	Note	%±
2010	1,456		—
2020	1,244		−14.6%
2024 (est.)	1,214		−2.4%
U.S. Decennial Census

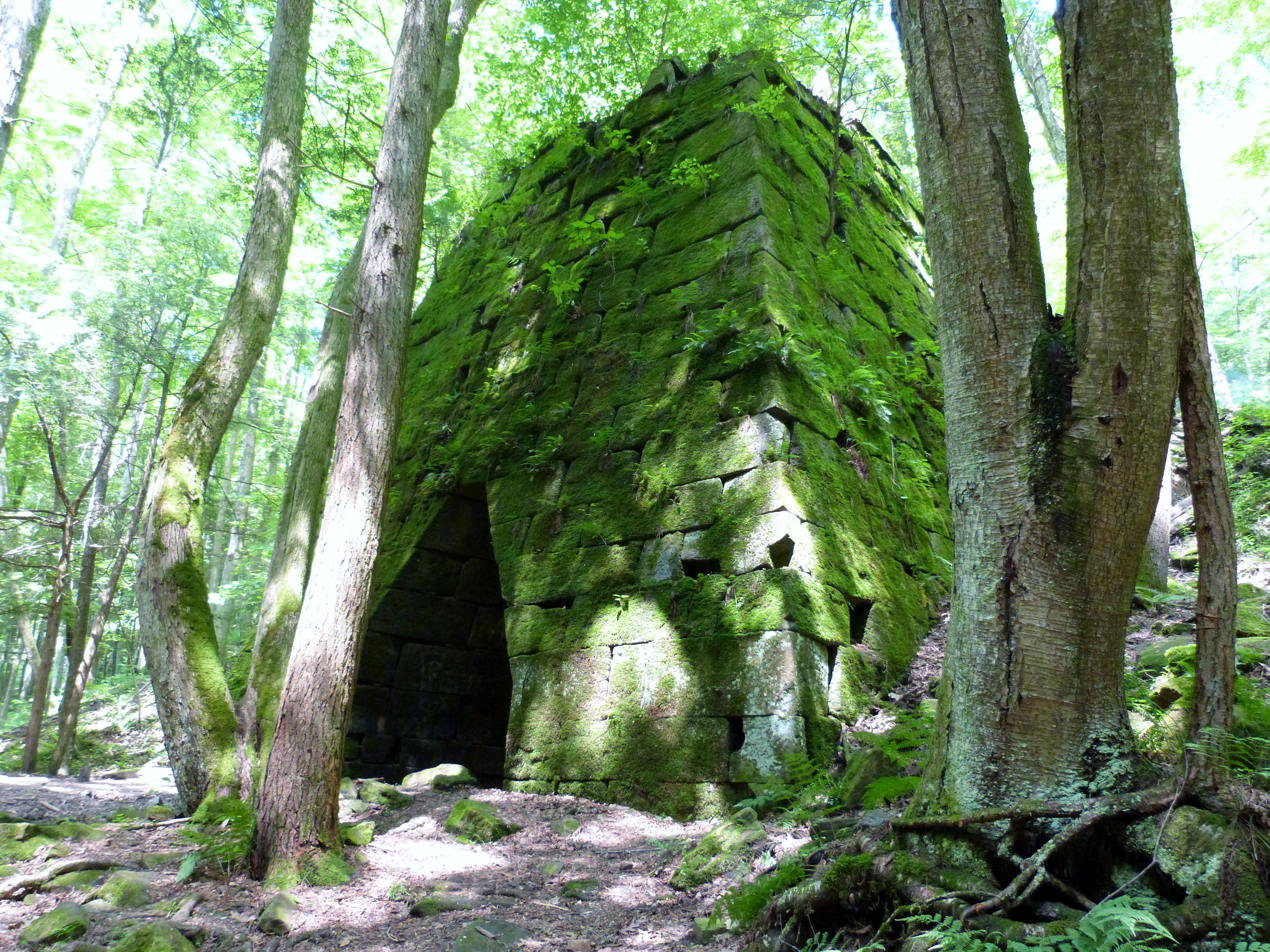
Rockland Furnace, a historic site in the township

As of the census of 2000, there were 1,346 people, 556 households, and 399 families residing in the township. The population density was 27.1 inhabitants per square mile (10.5/km^{2}). There were 1,255 housing units at an average density of 25.2/sq mi (9.7/km^{2}). The racial makeup of the township was 98.96% White, 0.07% African American, 0.07% Native American, 0.07% Asian, 0.30% Pacific Islander, and 0.52% from two or more races. Hispanic or Latino of any race were 0.59% of the population.

There were 556 households, of which 27.9% had children under the age of 18 living with them, 63.5% were married couples living together, 5.6% had a female householder with no husband present, and 28.2% were non-families. 24.6% of all households were made up of individuals, and 11.2% were someone living alone who was 65 years of age or older. The average household size was 2.42 and the average family size was 2.89.

In the township the population was spread out, with 21.8% under the age of 18, 5.8% from 18 to 24, 25.8% from 25 to 44, 28.7% from 45 to 64, and 18.0% who were 65 years of age or older. The median age was 43 years. For every 100 females, there were 105.8 males. For every 100 females age 18 and over there were 104.1 males.

The median income for a household in the township was $31,129, and the median income for a family was $34,491. Males had a median income of $31,477 compared with $22,411 for females. The per capita income for the township was $15,495. About 8.6% of families and 12.7% of the population were below the poverty line, including 22.9% of those under age 18 and 3.8% of those age 65 or over.
