= Rockland St Peter =

Village in Norfolk, England

Coordinates: 52.53°N 0.93°E

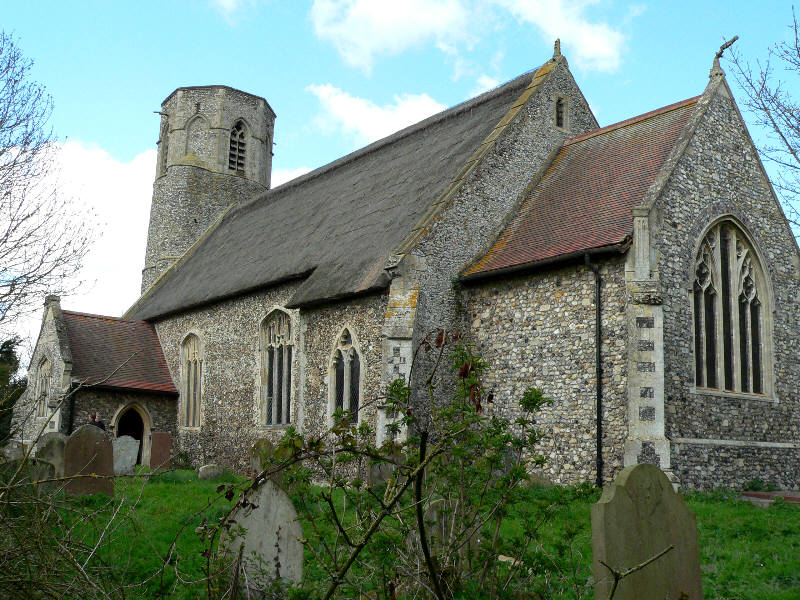
- Rockland St Peter

- Location within Norfolk
- Civil parish: Rocklands
- District: Breckland
- Shire county: Norfolk
- Region: East
- Country: England
- Sovereign state: United Kingdom
- Post town: Attleborough
- Postcode district: NR17
- Dialling code: 01953

Rockland St Peter is a village and former civil parish, now in the parish of Rocklands, in the Breckland district, in the county of Norfolk, England. Its church is one of 124 existing round-tower churches in Norfolk. In 1931 the parish had a population of 286.

== History ==
The villages name means 'rook grove', the "St Peter" part from the dedication of the church. On 1 April 1935 the parish was abolished to form Rocklands.
