= Rocklands =

Parish in Norfolk, England

Coordinates: 52.5367°N 0.91712°E

- Location within Norfolk
- Area: 10.97 km^{2} (4.24 sq mi)
- Population: 722 (2011)
  - Density: 66/km^{2} (170/sq mi)
- OS grid reference: TL979972
- Civil parish: Rocklands
- District: Breckland
- Shire county: Norfolk
- Region: East
- Country: England
- Sovereign state: United Kingdom
- Post town: ATTLEBOROUGH
- Postcode district: NR17
- Dialling code: 01953
- Police: Norfolk
- Fire: Norfolk
- Ambulance: East of England
- Website: http://rocklands.org.uk/

Rocklands is a civil parish in the English county of Norfolk which encompasses the villages of Rockland All Saints and Rockland St Peter. It covers an area of 10.97 km^{2} (4.24 sq mi) and had a population of 702 in 282 households at the 2001 census, increasing to a population of 722 in 279 households at the 2011 Census. For the purposes of local government, it falls within the district of Breckland.

== History ==
The parish was formed on 1 April 1935 from Rockland All Saints and St Andrew and Rockland St Peter.
