= Robert Harling (knight) =

English early member of the landed gentry, soldier and political strongman

Sir Robert Harling (died 9 September 1435) was an English early member of the landed gentry, a soldier, and political strongman. The Norfolk villages of East Harling, West Harling, Harling Market and Larling were greatly under his control. He married Jane Gonville, whose father established what was to become Gonville and Caius College, Cambridge.

He died on the feast of Gregory, fighting under John, Duke of Bedford, during the Hundred Years' War. Bedford died less than a week thereafter. He is buried in the East Harling Church, of which his coat of arms is a main feature.

An anonymous Parisian chronicler described how Harling's body was prepared for transportation to Norfolk. He wrote: "His [Harling's] body was afterwards cut up and boiled in a cauldron at the St. Nicholas cemetery until the flesh came off the bones. These were then carefully cleaned and packed in a chest to be taken to England. The flesh, the entrails and water were buried in a big grave at the St. Nicholas cemetery."

His daughter, Anne, married William Chamberlain (d. 1462), a soldier, and later Sir Robert Wingfield (Member of Parliament for Herts, comptroller of the House of Edward IV).
