= Rockland All Saints =

Village in Norfolk, England

Coordinates: 52.53°N 0.93°E

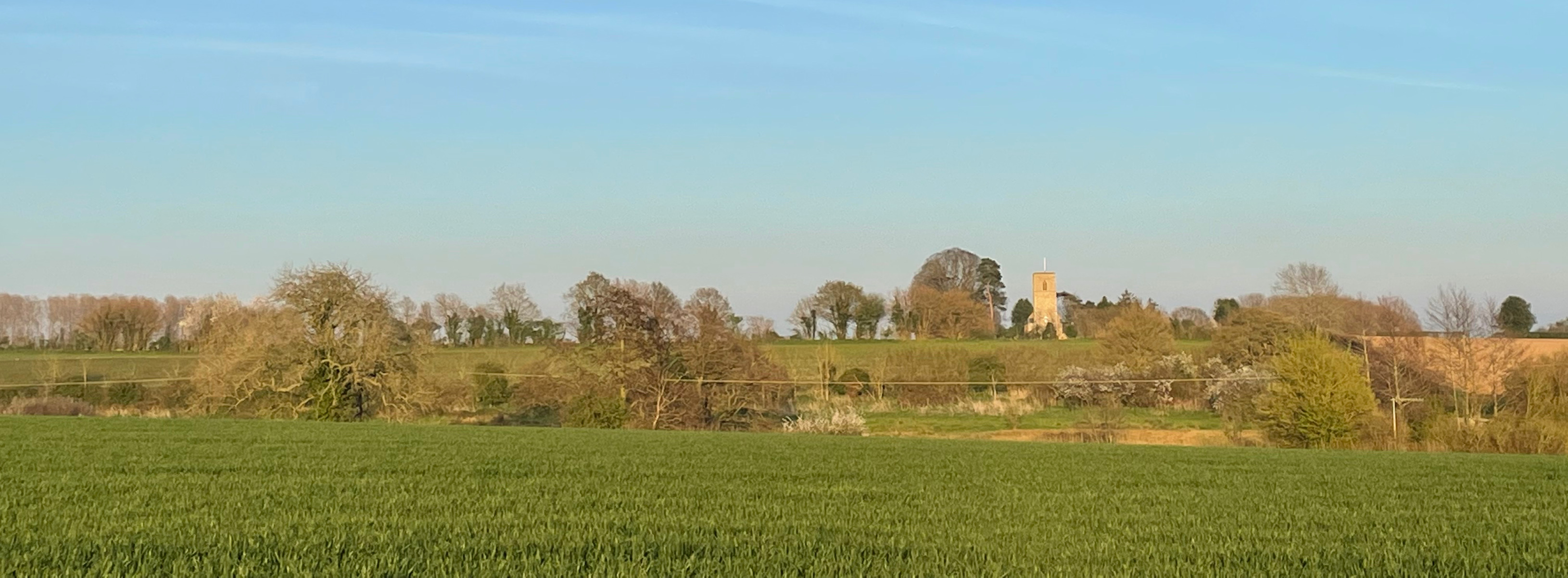
- Rockland All Saints church tower

- Location within Norfolk
- Civil parish: Rocklands
- District: Breckland
- Shire county: Norfolk
- Region: East
- Country: England
- Sovereign state: United Kingdom
- Post town: Attleborough
- Postcode district: NR17
- Dialling code: 01953

Rockland All Saints is a village and former civil parish, now in the parish of Rocklands, in the Breckland district, in the county of Norfolk, England. In 1881 the parish had a population of 324. Rockland All Saints has a church called All Saints' which is less than a mile from the village.

== History ==
The name "Rockland" means 'Rook grove'. Rockland was recorded in the Domesday Book as Rokelun(d)lunt. On 25 March 1885 the parish was abolished and merged with Rockland St. Andrews to form Rockland All Saints and St. Andrews.
