= Brundall =

Village in Norfolk, England

Coordinates: 52.624°N 1.434°E

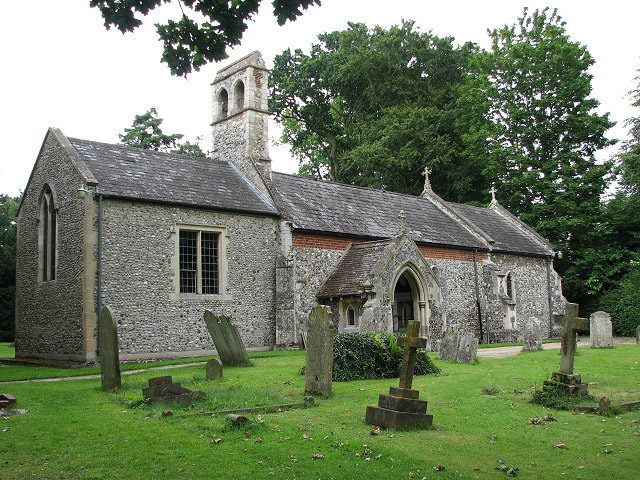
- St Laurence's Church

- Location within Norfolk
- Area: 4.39 km^{2} (1.69 sq mi)
- Population: 4,388 (2021)
  - Density: 1,000/km^{2} (2,600/sq mi)
- OS grid reference: TG325085
- Civil parish: Brundall
- District: Broadland
- Shire county: Norfolk
- Region: East
- Country: England
- Sovereign state: United Kingdom
- Post town: NORWICH
- Postcode district: NR13
- Dialling code: 01603
- Police: Norfolk
- Fire: Norfolk
- Ambulance: East of England
- UK Parliament: Broadland and Fakenham

Brundall is a village and civil parish in the English county of Norfolk. It is 5 miles (8.0 km) west of Acle and 6 miles (9.7 km) east of Norwich.

== History ==
Brundall's name is of Anglo-Saxon origin and in the Domesday Book it is recorded as a settlement of 70 households in the hundred of Blofield. The village was part of the estates of William the Conqueror, Bishop William of Thetford and Gilbert the Bowman.

In 1874, Brundall was the location of the Thorpe rail accident, a major head-on collision between two railway locomotives which resulted in the deaths of 25 people. In 1898, the boatbuilder, Brooms of Brundall, was established. This company has built high quality watercraft and operated water tours on the Broads for over a century and is still in operation.

== Geography ==
Brundall is located on the north-bank of the River Yare. As in other Broadland villages, the land lying directly adjacent to the river falls into the executive area of the Broads Authority. The A47, between Birmingham and Lowestoft, runs through the parish.

At the 2021 census, the parish had a population of 4,388, an increase from 4,019 at the 2011 census.

The village is served by two railway stations on the Wherry Lines: Brundall and Brundall Gardens. There are regular services between Great Yarmouth, Lowestoft and Norwich, which are operated by Greater Anglia. First Eastern Counties provides regular bus services to Norwich, Blofield Heath, Silfield and Lingwood on the Green Line routes.

== St. Laurence's Church ==
Brundall's parish church is dedicated to Saint Lawrence and dates from the 13th century. The building is Grade II listed. The church's lychgate serves as a memorial to local men who died in the First World War, whilst inside there is a surviving medieval lead font, reported to be the only lead font in East Anglia. The church also has stained-glass designed by Clayton and Bell and Charles Eamer Kempe.

== Notable people ==
- Henry William Evans (1890–1927) athlete, rugby player and surgeon, General Practitioner in Brundall.
- Herbert Woods (1891–1954) boat builder, born in Brundall.
- Robert Blake, Baron Blake (1916–2003) historian, born and died in Brundall.
- Robert Ashton (1924–2013) historian, lived in Brundall.
- John Carter (b.1963) Norfolk cricketer, born in Brundall.
- Bruce Rushin (b. 1956) art teacher and coin designer, lived in Brundall.
