= List of windmills in Norfolk =

Extant (red) and former (blue) non-drainage windmills in Norfolk.
1 Aslacton, 2 Aylsham, 3 Billingford, 4 Burnham Overy, 5 Burnham Overy Staithe, 6 Carbrooke, 7 Caston, 8 Catfield, 9 Cley, 10 Denver, 11 Diss, 12 East Dereham, 13 East Harling, 14 East Runton, 15 East Wretham, 16 Frettenham, 17 Garboldisham, 18 Gayton, 19 Great Bircham, 20 Great Ellingham, 21 Halvergate, 22 Harpley, 23, Hempnall, 24 Hickling, 25 Hindolveston, 26 Hindringham, 27 Honingham, 28 Horsford, 29 Ingham, 30 Little Cressingham, 31 Little Melton, 32 Ludham (How Hill), 33 Ludham (St Benet's Abbey), 34 Mileham, 35 Mulbarton, 36 Neatishead, 37 North Creake, 38 Norwich (Bixley) 39 Norwich (Carrow), 40 Norwich (Lakenham), 41 Oby, 42 Old Buckenham, 43 Paston, 44 Potter Heigham, 45 Reedham, 46 Ringstead, 47 Roughton, 48 Saham Toney, 49 Scole, 50 Sea Palling, 51 Shouldham Thorpe, 52 Smallburgh, 53 Stoke Ferry, 54 Stokesby, 55 Stratton St Michael, 56 Sutton, 57 Thrigby, 58 Upwell, 59 Walpole St Peter, 60 West Walton (Fen End), 61 West Walton (Ingleborough), 62 West Winch, 63 Weybourne, 64 Wicklewood, 65 Wiveton (Blakeney), 66 Worstead, 67 Wymondham, 68 Yaxham

A list of windmills and windmill sites which lie in the current ceremonial county of Norfolk. This list covers those windmills that had a function other than drainage. Drainage mills are covered by the List of drainage windmills in Norfolk. Mills used for drainage and another function appear on both lists.

== Locations ==
=== A ===
Location	Name of mill and grid reference	Type	Maps	First mention or built	Last mention or demise	Photograph
Acle	Acle Mill; TG 3990 1038	Post	1775; 1797; 1826; 1834	1633	Demolished c. 1836; Norfolk Mills	
Acle	High Mill; TG 3990 1038	Tower		c. 1836	Demolished c. 1907; Norfolk Mills	
Alburgh	Alburgh Mill; TM 2540 8772		1826	1816	1826; Norfolk Mills	
Alburgh	Alburgh Mill; TM 2540 8772	Post	1834	1826	Demolished 1911; Norfolk Mills	
Aldeby	Mill Hill Mill; TM 4543 9332	Post			Norfolk Mills	
Aldeby	Waterheath Mill; TM 4403 9420	Post		1827	1900; Norfolk Mills	
Aldeby	Waterloo Mill; TM 4310 9340	Post	1783	1601	Blown down November 1795; Norfolk Mills	
Aldeby	Waterloo Mill; TM 4310 9340	Post	1797; 1826	1797	1826; Norfolk Mills	
Ashby St Mary	Ashby St Mary Mill; TG 3275 0145	Post	1797; 1826	c. 1757	1916; Norfolk Mills	
Ashill				1599	Blown down 1599; Norfolk Mills	
Ashill	Ashill Mill; TF 8867 0498	Post	1826; 1834	1821	Demolished October 1884; Norfolk Mills	
Aslacton				1751	1802; Norfolk Mills	
Aslacton	Aslacton Mill; TM 1575 9037	Tower	1838	1834	Norfolk Mills	
Attleborough	Dodd's Lane Mill; TM 0390 9425	Tower	1797; 1826	1788	Demolished c. 1865; Norfolk Mills	
Attleborough	Town Street Mill; TM 0460 9523	Post		1796	1796; Norfolk Mills	
Attleborough	Great Mill; TM 0460 9523	Smock	1826	1804	Demolished November 1861; Norfolk Mills	
Attleborough	Hargham Road Mill; TM 0435 9460	Post	1826	1813	1888; Norfolk Mills	
Attleborough	New Mill; TM 0446 9472	Tower		1879	Burnt down 3 April 1912; Norfolk Mills	
Attleborough	Norwich Road mill approximately TM 050 955	Post	1675	1675	1675; Norfolk Mills	
Attleborough		Post		1198	1297; Norfolk Mills	
Attleborough	Queen's Road Mill approximately TM 044 955	Post	1675; 1797	1558	Moved to Morley St Boltolph c. 1804; Norfolk Mills	
Attleborough	Station Mill; TM 0530 9487	Tower		1857	Collapsed 21 January 1911; Norfolk Mills	
Aylmerton	Aylmerton Mill			1614	1649, gone by 1722	
Aylsham	Buttlands Mill; TG 1910 2665	Tower	1826; 1838	1826	Demolished 1941; Norfolk Mills	
Aylsham	Cawston Road Mill; TG 1858 2651	Tower	1838	1826	Demolition started 1920 but abandoned. Norfolk Mills	

=== B ===
Location	Name of mill and grid reference	Type	Maps	First mention or built	Last mention or demise	Photograph
Babingley		Post		14th century	14th century Norfolk Mills	
Bacton		Post		1416	1416; Norfolk Mills	
Bacton	Bacton Wood Mill; TG 3000 3085	Post	1797; 1826; 1834	1797	1834; Norfolk Mills	
Bale				1841	1845; Norfolk Mills	
Banham	Banham Mill; TM 0525 8800	Composite		1840	1936, gone by 1949; Norfolk Mills	
Banham	Mill Road Mill; TM 0683 8838	Post	1797	1782	Blown down c. 1915; Norfolk Mills	
Banham	Banham Mill; TM 0785 8750	Tower	1797	1782	1901; Norfolk Mills	
Banningham	Banningham Mill; TG 215 296	Post	1797; 1829	1783	1890	
Barney	North Mill; TF 9990 3170	Post	1826	1826	1883; Norfolk Mills	
Barney	South Mill; TF 9960 3150	Post	1826	1826	1883; Norfolk Mills	
Barney	TF 9990 3282	Tower		1871	1891; Norfolk Mills	
Barnham Broom	TG 0780 0735	Post	1797; 1826	1797	1826, gone by 1846; Norfolk Mills	
Barnham Broom	TG 0755 0737	Tower	1834	1818	Demolished c. 1942; Norfolk Mills	
Barton Bendish	Lovell's Mill; TF 7220 0520	Post		1338	1338; Norfolk Mills	
Barton Bendish				1627	1754; Norfolk Mills	
Barton Bendish	TF 7305 0270	Smock		1808	Demolished 1899; Norfolk Mills	
Barton Turf	Barton Turf Mill; TG 3414 2250	Post	1797; 1826	1761	1898, gone by 1937; Norfolk Mills	
Barwick	TF 8052 3574			1243	1263; Norfolk Mills	
Barwick		Post		1698	Moved to Docking, 1698; Norfolk Mills	
Bawdeswell	Bawdeswell Mill; TG 0390 2075	Smock	1797; 1826	1753	Demolished c. 1852; Norfolk Mills	
Beachamwell	TF 7400 0595		1824; 1826; 1834	1824	1872; Norfolk Mills	
Beachamwell	Rainoll's Mill approximately TF 738 051			1627	1650	
Beckham				1598	1598; Norfolk Mills	
Bedingham	Bedingham Mill; TM 2893 9379	Smock	1797; 1826	1763	Demolished November 1927; Norfolk Mills	
Beeston	Beeston Mill; TF 9014 1613	Post		1838	1844; Norfolk Mills	
Beeston Regis				1347	1347; Norfolk Mills	
Beeston Regis				1811	1811; Norfolk Mills	
Beetley	Approximately; TF 9557 1858			1310	1310; Norfolk Mills	
Belton	TG 475 032		1883	1883	1883	
Belton	TG 476 026		1883	1883	1883	
Belton	TG 477 035		1883	1883	1883	
Bergh Apton	Yelverton Mill; TG 3030 0193	Post	1675; 1797; 1826; 1834	1675	1871; Norfolk Mills	
Besthorpe	Bunwell Road Mill; TM 067 956		1834	1834	1834; Norfolk mills	
Besthorpe	Black Carr Mill; TM 0598 9602	Post		1847	1884, gone by 1898; Norfolk Mills	
Besthorpe	Black Carr Mill; TM 0966 9571	Smock	1838	1838	1862; Norfolk Mills	
Besthorpe	Besthorpe Mill; TM 0598 9602	Tower	1834	1830	Demolished c. 1943; Norfolk Mills	
Betwick				c. 1200	c. 1200; Norfolk Mills	
Billingford	Billingford Mill; TG 0140 2050	Post	1797; 1826	1797	Blown down 1895; Norfolk Mills	
Billingford	Pyrleston Mill; TM 1670 7858	Post	1797; 1826	1797	Blown down 22 September 1859; Norfolk Mills	
Billingford	Billingford Mill; TM 1670 7858	Tower		1860	Norfolk Mills	
Binham	Binham Mill; TF 9855 4080	Post	1797	1738	1871; Norfolk Mills	
Binham	Frankling's Mill; TF9781 4000	Tower	1826; 1838	1826	1871; Norfolk Mills	
Blofield	Blofield Mill; TG 3320 1215	Post	1797	1793	1813; Norfolk Mills	
Blofield	Lingwood Road Mill; TG 3472 0945	Post	1797; 1826	1791	1865; Norfolk Mills	
Blofield Heath	Blofield Heath Mill; TG 3327 1145	Smock		1815	Demolished c. 1833; Norfolk Mills	
Blofield Heath	Blofield Heath Mill; TG 3327 1145	Tower		c. 1833	Demolished 26 October 1937; Norfolk Mills	
Blo' Norton	Fordham's Mill				Blew down 1807; Norfolk Mills	
Blo Norton	Fordham's Mill	Post		1816	Moved within Blo Norton September 1821; Norfolk Mills	
Blo Norton	Fordham's Mill; TM 0153 7910	Post	1826	1821	Demolished 1890; Norfolk Mills	
Booton	Booton Mill; TG 1095 2260	Post		1848	Demolished 1900; Norfolk Mills	
Bradfield				1690	1691; Norfolk Mills	
Bradwell	TG 510 042	Post	1736	1736	1903	
Bradwell	TG 512 060		1883	1883	1883	
Bramerton	Bramerton Mill		1675	1675	1675; Norfolk Mills	
Bramerton	Mill Hill Mill	Tower		1854	1877; Norfolk Mills	
Brancaster	North Mill; TF 7725 4300	Post	1797; 1824	1749	Demolished c. 1905; Norfolk Mills	
Brancaster	South Mill; TF 7725 4290	Post	1797	1797	1891; Norfolk Mills	
Bressingham	(two mills)			14th century	14th century Norfolk Mills	
Bressingham	Common Mill; TM 0927 8260			1677	Blown down November 1795; Norfolk Mills	
Bressingham	Common Mill; TM 0927 8260	Smock	1797	1797	Demolished 1931; Norfolk Mills	
Bressingham	Fen Street Mill; TM 0626 8065	Smock	1837	1836	1901; Norfolk Mills	
Bressingham	Lopham Road Mill; TM 0667 8100	Smock		1841	Demolished c. 1927; Norfolk Mills	
Bridgham	Bridgham Mill			1558	1561; Norfolk Mills	
Bridgham	Bridgham Mill; TL 9615 8610	Post	1838	1808	Demolished c. 1878; Norfolk Mills	
Briningham	TG 0356 3360	Post	1749; 1765; 1797; 1826; 1838	1749	1838, gone by 1875; Norfolk Mills	
Briningham	TG 0356 3360	Post	1826; 1838	1826	1879; Norfolk Mills	
Briningham	Briningham Mill; TG 0342 3348	Smock		1721	1771, gone by 1780; Norfolk Mills	
Brisley	Brisley Mill; TF 9528 2119	Post	1838	1836	Demolished c. 1920; Norfolk Mills	
Briston	East Mill; TG 0672 3222	Post	1797; 1826; 1838	1765	Demolished April 1858; Norfolk Mills	
Briston	West Mill; TG 0672 3221	Post		1843	Collapsed 6 May 1894; Norfolk Mills	
Brooke	High Green Mill; TM 2803 9873	Post		1829	1850; Norfolk Mills	
Brooke	Mill Lane Mill; TM 2790 9772	Post	1838	1836	1892; Norfolk Mills	
Broome	Broome Mill; TM 3540 9300	Post	1797	1751	1802	
Broome	Broome Mill; TM34819111	Tower	1838	1824	1892; Norfolk Mills	
Brotford				13th century	13th century Norfolk Mills	
Bunwell				c. 1639	c. 1639; Norfolk Mills	
Bunwell	Bunwell mill TM 1200 9380	Smock	1826; 1834	1826	1888; Norfolk Mills	
Burgh Castle	TG 487 040	Tower	1837	1837	Demolished c. 1925	
Burgh Castle	Black Mill; Jyber's Mill; TG 489 064	Tower	1826^{*} 1837	1826	1886	
Burgh Castle	TG 475 037		1883	1883	1883	
Burgh St Margaret	Old Burgh Mill; TG 4405 1452	Tower	1797	1797	Demolished c. 1914; Norfolk Mills	
Burgh St Margaret	Burgh St Margaret Mill	Post		1742	1787; Norfolk Mills	
Burgh St Margaret	Mill Lane Mill; TG 4436 1427	Tower	1826	1826	Demolished c. 1940; Norfolk Mills	
Burgh St Peter	Burgh St Peter Mill; TM 4672 9345	tower		1839	Truncated 1953; Norfolk Mills	
Burlingham				12th century	12th century Norfolk Mills	
Burnham Deepdale				1579	1579; Norfolk Mills	
Burnham Market	Burnham Market Mill; TF 8365 4250	Post	1797; 1826	1750	1892; Norfolk Mills	
Burnham Overy	Burnham Overy Mill; TF 8378 4376	Tower	1826	1816	Norfolk Mills	
Burnham Overy	Union Mills; TF 8423 4260	Tower	1826	1814	Norfolk Mills	
Burnham Overy Staithe	Burnham Overy Staithe Mill; TF 8435 4400		1797	1797	1797; Norfolk Mills	
Burnham Overy Staithe	Burnham Overy Staithe Mill; TF 8435 4400	Post		c. 1805	1892; Norfolk Mills	
Burnham Overy Town	Burnham Overy Town Mill; TF 8455 4280		1797	1797	1811; Norfolk Mills	
Burnham Thorpe	Burnham Thorpe Mill	Post		1813	1814; Norfolk Mills	
Burston	Burston Mill; TM 1333 8410		1797	1750	1797; Norfolk Mills	
Burston	Burston Mill; TM 1347 8385	Tower	1826	1826	Burnt down 1931; Norfolk Mills	

=== C ===
Location	Name of mill and grid reference	Type	Maps	First mention or built	Last mention or demise	Photograph
Caister	East Mill; TG 5267 1207	Tower	1826	c. 1818	Demolished 1902; Norfolk Mills	
Caister	Ness Mill; TG 5199 1285				Norfolk Mills	
Caister	North Mill; TG 5199 1285	Post	1826	1826	Demolished 9 November 1861; Norfolk Mills	
Caister	South Mill; TG 5223 1168	Post	1797; 1826	1788	1855; Norfolk Mills	
Carbrooke	Mill Drift Mill; TL 9615 9881	Post	1797; 1826	1797	Blown down 29 November 1836; Norfolk Mills	
Carbrooke	Mill Drift Mill; TL 9615 9881	Post	1838	1838	Demolished c. 1925; Norfolk Mills	
Carbrooke	Mill Lane Mill; TF 9524 0096	Post	1797; 1826; 1834	1797	Demolished 1856; Norfolk Mills	
Carbrooke	Mill Lane Mill; TF 9524 0096	Tower		1856	Norfolk Mills	
Carbrooke	Shipdham Road Mill; TF 9494 0250	Post	1826; 1834	1814	1836; Norfolk Mills	
Carleton Rode	TM 0985 9330	Post	1797	1797	1807; Norfolk Mills	
Carleton Rode		Post		1807	1807; Norfolk Mills	
Carleton Rode	TM 1060 9325	Smock	1836	c. 1832	1845; Norfolk Mills	
Carleton Rode	TM 0995 9455	Tower		c. 1858	Collapsed c. 1958; Norfolk Mills	
Castle Acre	Newton Road Mill; TF 8210 1560	Post	1826	1819	Demolished November 1881; Norfolk Mills	
Castle Acre	Priest's Mill	Post		1810	1813; Norfolk Mills	
Castle Acre	Sandy Lane Mill; TF 8234 1563			c. 1841	1891; Norfolk Mills	
Castle Rising	TF 6772 2500		1824; 1826	1824	1867; Norfolk Mills	
Caston	Caston Mill; TL 9510 9816	Post	1834	1834	Moved to Old Buckenham, 1864; Norfolk Mills	
Caston	Caston Mill; TL 9510 9816	Tower		1864	Norfolk Mills	
Catfield				1710	1772; Norfolk Mills	
Catfield	Swim Coots Mill; TG 4113 2122	tower	1838	1838	Norfolk Mills	
Catfield	Mill Road Mill; TG 3873 2094	Post	1797; 1826	1774	Demolished September 1937; Norfolk Mills	
Cawston	TG 1555 2435	Post	1797	1797	1797; Norfolk Mills	
Cawston	Hill Farm; TG 1330 2425	Smock	1826	1782	Burnt down 22 May 1875; Norfolk Mills	
Cawston	Black Mill; TG 1355 2463	Tower		1853	Demolished 1955; Norfolk Mills	
Cawston	White Mill; TG 1356 2460	Tower		1853	1955, gone by 1984; Norfolk Mills	
Chedgrave				1315	1576; Norfolk Mills	
Claxton	Claxton Mill; TG 3430 0340	Smock	1834	1834	Demolished 1945; Norfolk Mills	
Clenchwarton	Clenchwarton Mill; TF 5998 2075		1824; 1826	1824	1866; Norfolk Mills	
Clenchwarton	Clenchwarton Mill; TF 5998 2075	Post		June; 1870	Demolished October 1870; Norfolk Mills	
Cley next the Sea	TG 0532 4280	Post			Norfolk Mills	
Cley next the Sea	Cley Mill; TG 0449 4404	Tower	1826	1819	Norfolk Mills	
Clippesby				1259	1259; Norfolk Mills	
Cobholm	TG 511 075	Tower	1837	1837	1886	
Cockley Cley				1240	1287; Norfolk Mills	
Cockley Cley	(two mills) approximately TF 792 045			1570	1570; Norfolk Mills	
Colkirk				1331	1331; Norfolk Mills	
Congham	TF 7255 2300		1675	1675	1675; Norfolk Mills	
Congham	Congham Mill; TF 7255 2300	Smock	1797; 1826	1797	1880; Norfolk Mills	
Corpusty	Black Mill; TG 1125 3015	Post	1826	1826	1872, gone by 1875; Norfolk Mills	
Corpusty	White Mill; TG 1109 3018	Post	1797; 1826	1730	Demolished October 1902; Norfolk Mills	
Corpusty	TG 1072 2973		1826	1826	1826, gone by 1839; Norfolk Mills	
Costessey	Stone Hills Mill; Eastwood Mill; TG 1820 1190	Post	1834; 1838	c. 1810	Demolished 1902; Norfolk Mills	
Cranworth	Cranworth Mill; TF 9945 0580				Blown down Novemober 1795; Norfolk Mills	
Cranworth	Cranworth Mill; TF 9945 0580	Smock	1797; 1826	1797	Blown down 24 March 1895; Norfolk Mills	
Cromer	Approximately; TG 225 410		1675	1675	1675	
Cromer	Mill Road Mill approximately TG 225 410	Post		1765	1810; Norfolk Mills	
Cromer	West Street Mill; TG 2135 4195	Post	1797; 1826	1630	1830; Norfolk Mills	
Croxton	Croxton Mill; TF 9792 3135	Post	1826	1803	Demolished 1885; Norfolk Mills	
Croxton	Croxton Mill; TF 9792 3135	Tower		1885	1926, gone by 1937; Norfolk Mills	
Croxton	TL 8740 8485	Tower		1842	1846; Norfolk Mills	

=== D ===
Location	Name of mill and grid reference	Type	Maps	First mention or built	Last mention or demise	Photograph
Denton	Great Green Mill; TM 2765 8977	Post	1838	1836	1896; Norfolk Mills	
Denver	Denver Mill; TF 6050 0121		1824; 1826	1825	Demolished 1835; Norfolk Mills	
Denver	Denver Mill; TF 6050 0121	Tower		1835	Norfolk Mills	
Deopham				1303	1303; Norfolk Mills	
Deopham	TM 0460 9675	Smock	1826	1783	Demolished c. 1830; Norfolk Mills	
Deopham	Deopham Mill; TM 0460 9675	Tower		c. 1830	1949; Norfolk Mills	
Dersingham	Mill Road Mill; TF 6955 3143	Post	1797; 1826	1797	Demolished February 1907; Norfolk Mills	
Dersingham	Mill Hill Mill; TF 6815 3073	Post	1797	1797	1797; Norfolk Mills	
Dersingham	Mill Way Mill; TF 6920 3085	Post	1797	1797	Blown down February 1808; Norfolk Mills	
Dickleburgh	(two mills)			1306	1306; Norfolk Mills	
Dickleburgh	Burston Wood Mill; TM 1657 8240		1837	1780	Demolished c. 1890; Norfolk Mills	
Dicklebugh	Langmere Mill; TM 186 819	Post		1802	1804; Norfolk Mills	
Dickleburgh				1751	Moved to Mulbarton, August 1754; Norfolk Mills	
Dickleburgh	Rectory Road Mill; TM 1714 8231	Post	1797; 1826	1797	1917; Norfolk Mills	
Didlington	TL 7900 9680		1824; 1826; 1838	1824	1838; Norfolk Mills	
Dilham				1633	1633; Norfolk Mills	
Dilham	TG 3275 2680	Post	1826	1814	Demolished September 1875; Norfolk Mills	
Dilham	TG 3325 2680	Smock	1826; 1838	1826	Moved to Wymondham (North Mill), 1858; Norfolk Mills	
Dilham	Staithe Mill; TG 3346 2506	Tower	1838	1838	Demolished c. 1935; Norfolk Mills	
Diss	Chapel Lane Mill; TM 1180 7916	Post	1837	1837	Moved to Roydon (Shelfanger Road) c. 1865; Norfolk Mills	
Diss	Heywod Mill; TM 1220 8550	Tower	1826; 1834	1816	1876; Norfolk Mills	
Diss	Rose Lane Mill; TM 1275 7910	Tower	1783; 1838	1783	Converted to composite mill c. 1834; Norfolk Mills	
Diss	Rose Lane Mill; TM 1280 7915	Post	1838	1817	Blown down 31 July 1834; Norfolk Mills	
Diss	Rose Lane Mill; TM 1275 7910	Composite		c. 1835	Demolished c. 1919; Norfolk Mills	
Diss	Sandy Lane Mill; TM 1310 7935	Post	1826	1818	Demolished 1902; Norfolk Mills	
Diss	Stuston Road Mill; Rush's Mill; TM 1292 7910	Post	1783; 1797; 1826	1705	Blown down 7 January 1839; Norfolk Mills	
Diss	Stuston Road Mill; TM 1292 7910	Smock		1839	Demolished 1818; Norfolk Mills	
Diss	Jay's Mill; Button's Mill; Victoria Road Mill; TM 1236 7923	Tower	1826	1817	Truncated 1930s Norfolk Mills	
Ditchingham	TM 3416 9126	Tower	1826	1810	Demolished November 1955; Norfolk Mills	
Docking				1615	Burnt down 1697; Norfolk Mills	
Docking	Mill Lane Mill; TF 7714 3636	Post	1797	1797	Demolished 1821; Norfolk Mills	
Docking	Mill Lane Mill; TF 7714 3636	Post	1824; 1826	1821	1888; Norfolk Mills	
Docking	Station Road Mill; TF 7640 3737	Post	1797; 1826	1797	1888; Norfolk Mills	
Docking	Temple Wood Mill; TF 7664 3637			1753	1755; Norfolk Mills	
Downham Market	Bexwell Road Mill; TF 6163 0335	Post	1797; 1826; 1834	1797	Demolished April 1881; Norfolk Mills	
Downham Market	Cowgate Street Mill	Tower		1803	1879; Norfolk Mills	
Downham Market	Denver Road Mill	Post		1809	Blown down January 1809; Norfolk Mills	
Downham Market	Denver Road Mill			1822	1840; Norfolk Mills	
Downham Market	Howdale Mill; TF 6150 0295	Post	1675; 1797; 1824	1675	1879; Norfolk Mills	
Downham Market	Lynn Road Mill; Wimbotsham Mills; TF 6175 0395	Post	1675; 1797; 1826	1675	Burnt down 25 March 1895; Norfolk Mills	
Downham Market	Mill Hill Mill		1662	1662	1706, gone by 1725; Norfolk Mills	

=== E ===
Location	Name of mill and grid reference	Type	Maps	First mention or built	Last mention or demise	Photograph
Earsham	TM 324 894	Post	1838	1838	1857; Norfolk Mills	
East Bilney	TF 9475 1985		1797	1719	1797, gone by 1838; Norfolk Mills	
East Bradenham	TF 9225 0869	Tower		1875	1949; Norfolk Mills	
East Dereham	Banyard's Mill; TF 9905 1304	Post		1815	1815; Norfolk Mills	
East Dereham				1250	1250; Norfolk Mills	
East Dereham	Quebec Road Mill; TF 9875 1380	Post		1558	1623; Norfolk Mills	
East Dereham	Quebec Road Mill; TF 9875 1380	Post	1797	c. 1757	1892, gone by 1896; Norfolk Mills	
East Dereham	East Dereham Mill; Fenwick's Mill; TG 0033 1297	Tower		1836	Norfolk Mills	
East Harling			1675	1675	Blown down 1765; Norfolk Mills	
East Harling	TL 9900 8650		1797	1779	1797; Norfolk Mills	
East Harling	TL 9975 8670	Smock	1826; 1834	1826	Moved to Shropham, 1835; Norfolk Mills	
East Harling	Kenninghall Road Mill; TM 0008 8608	Tower	1826; 1834	1820	Norfolk Mills	
East Lexham	TF 8555 1675		1675	1675	1675; Norfolk Mills	
East Lexham	Mill Plantation Mill; TF 8590 1735		1824; 1826; 1834	1824	1858; Norfolk Mills	
East Rudham	TF 8249 2785	Post	1797	1609	Demolished c. 1815; Norfolk Mills	
East Rudham	TF 8249 2785	Post		1836	1908; Norfolk Mills	
East Runton	East Runton Mill; TG 2005 4230	Tower	1826	1826	Norfolk Mills	
East Ruston	High Mill; Old Mill; TG 3684 2992	Post	1797	1759	1891; Norfolk Mills	
East Ruston	New Mill; TG 3608 2922	Tower		1868	1962, truncated by 1984; Norfolk Mills	
East Wretham	Mill Bottom		1749; 1765	1749	1765	
East Wretham	TL 9251 9057		1826; 1838	1826	1872; Norfolk Mills	
East Wretham	East Wretham Mill; TL 9251 9057	Tower		1875	Norfolk Mills	
Ebridge	Mill Hill Mill; TG 3130 2985	Tower		1841	1887; Norfolk Mills	
Edgefield	TG 0870 3437	Smock	1797	1781	Demolished c. 1804; Norfolk Mills	
Edgefield	TG 0870 3437	Post		1804	Burnt down October 1815; Norfolk Mills	
Edgefield	TG 0870 3437	Post		1828	1833; Norfolk Mills	
Ellingham	TM 3650 9250		1783; 1797	1783	1797; Norfolk Mills	
Ellingham	TM 3697 9252	Smock	1826; 1834	1807	1925; Norfolk Mills	
Emneth	TF 4955 0707	Tower		1832	Demolished 1947; Norfolk Mills	
Erpingham	TG 1890 3160	Smock			c. 1890, gone by 1894; Norfolk Mills	
Erpingham	Thwaite Common Mill; TG 1920 3205	Tower	1826; 1832	1826	1845; Norfolk Mills	
Erpingham	TG 2003 3122	Tower	1826	1826	1883; Norfolk Mills	

=== F ===
Location	Name of mill and grid reference	Type	Maps	First mention or built	Last mention or demise	Photograph
Fakenham	Fakenham Heath; TF 9360 2975	Post	1797	1718	1854; Norfolk Mills	
Fakenham	Holt Road Mill; TF 9290 3050	Post	1838	1838	Demolished September 1866; Norfolk Mills	
Fakenham	TF 9221 2986	Smock	1838	1818	Demolished c. 1848; Norfolk Mills	
Fakenham	TF 9221 2986	Tower		1839	1920; Norfolk Mills	
Felmingham	TG 2320 2968		1797; 1826	1774	1873; Norfolk Mills	
Felthorpe	Mill Farm Mill; TG 1622 1776	Post	1826	1826	1888; Norfolk Mills	
Felthorpe	Mill Hill Mill; TG 1620 1815	Post	1797	1775	Demolished c. 1820; Norfolk Mills	
Feltwell				1250	1277; Norfolk Mills	
Feltwell	Mill Drift	Post		1607	Burnt down May 1810; Norfolk Mills	
Feltwell	Mill Drift; TL 7130 9013	Smock	1824; 1826	1824	1877; Norfolk Mills	
Feltwell	Wilton Road Mill; TL 718 899	Post	1824; 1826	1815	1888; Norfolk Mills	
Feltwell	Wilton Road Mill; TL 718 899	Tower		1860	Demolished 1938; Norfolk Mills	
Feltwell	TL 7165 9090	Tower	1826	1820	1826; Norfolk Mills	
Fersfield	TM 0585 8180	Post	126; 1834	1812	1884; Norfolk Mills	
Field Dalling	Holt Road Mill; TG 0160 3885	Post	1826	1814	1826; Norfolk Mills	
Field Dalling	TG 0070 3950	Post	1797	1793	1797; Norfolk Mills	
Field Dalling	TG 0087 3915	Tower	1826	1826	1890; Norfolk Mills	
Fincham	Bainard Hall Manor Mill			Late 13th or early 14th century	Late 13th or early 14th century Norfolk Mills	
Fincham	Burnham's Mill			13th century	13th century Norfolk Mills	
Fincham	Cuple Manor Mill			1288	1319; Norfolk Mills	
Fincham	TF 6745 0550	Post	1749; 1824; 1826	1749	1883; Norfolk Mills	
Fincham	Talbot's Hall Manor Mill			1286	1286; Norfolk Mills	
Flordon	Flordon Mill; TM 1930 9685	Smock	1797; 1826	1797	Demolished 1870; Norfolk Mills	
Forncett	(two mills)			14th century	14th century Norfolk Mills	
Forncett				1279	1279; Norfolk Mills	
Forncett St Mary				1761	1774; Norfolk Mills	
Forncett St Peter	Black Mill; TM 1397 9396	Post	1826	1824	Demolished September 1932; Norfolk Mills	
Forncett St Peter	TM 1563 9296	Smock	1826; 1834	1826	1897; Norfolk Mills	
Forncett St Peter	Tacolneston Mill; TM 1375 9435	Post	1707	1707	Moved to new site (Black Mill) 1824; Norfolk Mills	
Forncett St Peter	White Mill; TM 1385 9393	Post	1826; 1834	1791	Collapsed 25 November 1917; Norfolk Mills	
Foulden	TL 7790 9920		1797; 1826	1797	1826; Norfolk Mills	
Foulsham	Foulsham Mill; TG 0327 2482	Tower	1826; 1838	1826	Burnt down 21 June 1912; Norfolk Mills	
Foulsham	Mill Hill Mill; TG 0305 2570	Post				
Foxley	Foxley Mill; TG 0320 2085	Tower		1845	c. 1899; Norfolk Mills	
Frettenham	TG 2430 1770	Post	1797	1797	1797; Norfolk Mills	
Frettenham	Frettenham Mill; TG 2459 1776	Tower		c. 1870	Norfolk Mills	
Fundenhall	TM 1333 9642	Post	1826; 1834	1815	1910; Norfolk Mills	

=== G ===
Location	Name of mill and grid reference	Type	Maps	First mention or built	Last mention or demise	Photograph
Garboldisham	Mill Pond Farm; TM 0132 8132			c. 1929	c. 1929; Norfolk Mills	
Garboldisham	Garboldisham Mill; TM 0026 8048			1580	1739; Norfolk Mills	
Garboldisham	Garboldisham Mill; TM 0026 8048	Post	1797; 1826; 1837	1778	Norfolk Mills	
Garboldisham	TM 0026 8040	Smock	1797; 1826; 1837	1788	Burnt down 22 August 1840; Norfolk Mills	
Garboldisham	TM 0024 8063	Tower	1837	1820	1854, gone by 1864; Norfolk Mills	
Garveston	TG 0393 0946	Post	1797; 1826	1785	Demolished January 1870; Norfolk Mills	
Gateley				1330	1330; Norfolk Mills	
Gayton	TF 7355 1925	Post	1797	1797	1819; Norfolk Mills	
Gayton	Gayton Mill; TF 7327 1928	Tower	1824; 1826	1824	1937, later truncated by one storey Norfolk Mills	
Gaywood	Almshouse Lane Mill; TF 6272 2027	Post	1797	1588	Demolished 1815; Norfolk Mills	
Gaywood	Almshouse Lane Mill; TF 6272 2027	Tower	1824; 1826	1815	1904 norfolk Mills	
Gaywood	Fairstead Mill; TF 6440 2030		1797; 1826	1797	1905, gone by 1922; Norfolk Mills	
Gaywood	Homeland Road Mill; TF 6250 2053	Tower	1824; 1826	c. 1820	Demolished 1914; Norfolk Mills	
Gaywood	Loke Road Mill; TF 626 207	Post	1797; 1824; 1826	1775	Demolished c. 1820; Norfolk Mills	
Gaywood	Loke Road Mill; TF 626 207	Post	1824; 1826	c. 1822	Demolished c. 1926; Norfolk Mills	
Gaywood	Wooton Road Mill; TF 639 216	Post	1824; 1826	1819	1888; Norfolk Mills	
Gaywood	Wooton Road Mill; TF 639 216	Tower	1824; 1826	1822	Demolished 1934; Norfolk Mills	
Gillingham	TM 4185 9127	Post	1675; 1797; 1826; 1834	1675	1862; Norfolk Mills	
Gimingham	(four mills)			1347	1347; Norfolk Mills	
Gimingham	TG 2890 3745	Post	1797; 1826; 1834	1754	1888; Norfolk Mills	
Gissing	Gissing Mill; TM 1506 8545	Post	1826; 1834	1778	Demolished 1949; Norfolk Mills	
Gooderstone	Chalkrow Lane Mill; TF 7519 0129	Tower		c. 1829	1946, later truncated by 6 ft (1.8m); Norfolk Mills	
Gooderstone	Mill Drove Mill; TF 7550 0153			1796	1841; Norfolk Mills	
Gooderstone	Quarry Mill; TF 7605 0180		1826; 1834	1826	1841; Norfolk Mills	
Gooderstone	Gooderstone Street Mill; TF 7631 0206	Tower	1826; 1834	1826	c. 1905; Norfolk Mills	
Gorleston	Cliff Hill Mill; Beevor's Mill	Tower		1864	Demolished 1887; Norfolk Mills	
Great Bircham	TF 7603 3267	Post	1824; 1826	1761	Demolished c. 1846; Norfolk Mills	
Great Bircham	Great Bircham Mill; TF 7603 3267	Tower		1846	Norfolk Mills	
Great Cressingham	TF 6470 0192	Post	1854	1883; Norfolk Mills		
Great Dunham	TF 8855 1410	Smock	1797	c. 1756	Demolished c. 1840; Norfolk Mills	
Great Dunham	TF 8855 1410	Tower		c. 1840	Demolished 1949; Norfolk Mills	
Great Ellingham	TM 0090 9687	Post	1797; 1826; 1834	1751	1872; Norfolk Mills	
Great Ellingham	Great Ellingham Mill; TM 0183 9688	Tower		c. 1849	Norfolk Mills	
Great Fransham	TF 8985 1340	Tower	1826	1826	1926; Norfolk Mills	
Great Hockham	TL 9590 9200			1392	1599; Norfolk Mills	
Great Hockham		Smock		1806	1814; Norfolk Mills	
Great Massingham	TF 8028 2332	Post	1824	1798	Burnt down c. 1916; Norfolk Mills	
Great Snoring				1620	1620; Norfolk Mills	
Great Walsingham	TF 9446 3750	Tower		1852	Demolished c. 1945; Norfolk Mills	
Great Walshingham	Mill Lane Mill; TF 9370 3755	Post	1826	1826	1826	
Great Yarmouth	Cobholm Mill; TG 5160 0770	Post			Norfolk Mills	
Great Yarmouth	Cobholm Mill; TG 5160 0770	Tower			Demolished c. 1880; Norfolk Mills	
Great Yarmouth	Cobholm Mill; TG 5160 0770	Post		c. 1880	1890; Norfolk Mills	
Great Yarmouth		Post		1790	Moved to North Denes 1856; Norfolk Mills	
Great Yarmouth	North Denes Mill; North Beach Mill; Greengrass's Black Mill; TG 5262 0918	Post		1856	Demolished 1907; Norfolk Mills	
Great Yarmouth	South Denes Mill	Post		1783	Burnt down 14 November 1783; Norfolk Mills	
Great Yarmouth	Papworth's Mill; Jetty Mill	Tower		c. 1875	Demolished 1881; Norfolk Mills	
Gresham	Mill Common Mill; TG 1520 3845	Post	1826	1825	1892, gone by 1927; Norfolk Mills	
Gressenhall				1273	1273; Norfolk Mills	
Gressenhall	Chapple Mills		1797	1795	1797; Norfolk Mills	
Gressenhall	TF 9630 1665	Smock	1838	1836	1914; Norfolk Mills	
Gressenhall	Workhouse Mill; TF 9730 1695			1781	1825; Norfolk Mills	
Grimston	Mill Hill Mill; TF 6980 2220		1675; 1797	1675	1815, gone by 1825; Norfolk Mills	

=== H ===
Location	Name of mill and grid reference	Type	Maps	First mention or built	Last mention or demise	Photograph
Hackford				1591	1591; Norfolk Mills	
Hainford			1675	1675	1675; Norfolk Mills	
Hainford	Chapel Street Mill; Approximately; TG 229 187	Tower		1849	1868; Norfolk Mills	
Hainford	Newton Road Mill; TG 2233 1890	Tower	1826	1825	1879; Norfolk Mills	
Hales	TM 3815 9717	Tower	1838	c. 1801	1949, gone by 1971; Norfolk Mills	
Halvergate	TG 4160 0598	Post	1797; 1826; 1834	1734	Demolished c. 1866; Norfolk Mills	
Halvergate	Halvergate Mill; TG 4160 0598	Tower		1866	Norfolk Mills	
Happisburgh	TG 3914 2933	Post		1758	Blown down 19 December 1770; Norfolk Mills	
Happisburgh	Mill Farm Mill; TG 3914 2933	Post	1826	1773	Demolished 1921; Norfolk Mills	
Hardingham	Flockthorpe Mill			12th century	12th century Norfolk Mills	
Hardingham	Approximately; TG 044 060		1797	1797	Demolished 1920; Norfolk Mills	
Hardingham	Runhall Mill; TG 0482 0626	Tower	1826; 1834	c. 1820	1908; Norfolk Mills	
Hardley				1298	1298; Norfolk Mills	
Hardwick	East Mill	Post	1826; 1834	1826	1922; Norfolk Mills	
Hardwick	West Mill; TM 2200 8937	Post	1797; 1826	1779	Moved to Alburgh c. 1826; Norfolk Mills	
Hargham		Post		1478	1478; Norfolk Mills	
Harleston	Common Mill; TM 2400 8280		1826; 1834	1826	1834; Norfolk Mills	
Harleston	Jay's Green Mill; TM 2485 8345	Tower	1837	1836	Demolished 1916; Norfolk Mills	
Harleston	Redenhall Road Mill; TM 2508 8385	Post		1836	Demolished May 1886; Norfolk Mills	
Harleston	School Lane Mill; TM 2490 8363	Post	1826; 1834	1807	1865; Norfolk Mills	
Harpley	TF 7991 2532	Post	1797; 1824; 1826	1790	Demolished c. 1832; Norfolk Mills	
Harpley	Harpley Mill; TF 7991 2532	Tower		1832	Norfolk Mills	
Heacham	TF 6847 3788			1830	1875; Norfolk Mills	
Hempnall				Late 12th century	Late 12th century Norfolk Mills	
Hempnall	Muskett's Mill; TM 2388 9380	Tower	1838	1828	Demolished c. 1930; Norfolk Mills	
Hempnall	Hempnall Green Mill	Smock	1826; 1834	1818	1904; Norfolk Mills	
Hempnall	Mill Road Mill; Approximately; TM 238 942	Post	1797	1705	1819; Norfolk Mills	
Hempnall	Vout's Mill; TM 2375 9423	Tower		1814	Norfolk Mills	
Hempstead	Abbey Mill			1306	1306; Norfolk Mills	
Hempstead	TG 0995 3750		1838	1838	1838; Norfolk Mills	
Hempton	Abbey Farm Mill; TF 9160 2890		1826; 1834	1802	1863; Norfolk Mills	
Hempton	TF 9105 2890	Post	1826; 1838	1798	1838; Norfolk Mills	
Hempton	TF 9114 2928	Tower	1838	1833	Demolished c. 1940; Norfolk Mills	
Hemsby	TG 4836 1760	Tower	1837	1836	Demolished 1928; Norfolk Mills	
Herringby				c. 1200	c. 1200; Norfolk Mills	
Hethersett				1672	1676; Norfolk Mills	
Hethersett	Great Melton Road Mill; TG 1465 0507	Post	1826; 1834	1779	1856; Norfolk Mills	
Hethersett	Mill Road Mill; TG 1482 0473	Post	1826; 1834	1826	1864; Norfolk Mills	
Hevingham	TG 2015 2140	Smock	1838	1836	1872; Norfolk Mills	
Hickling				c. 1200	c. 1200 Norfolk Mills	
Hickling					Demolished 1879; Norfolk Mills	
Hickling	Hickling Mill; TG 4086 2300	Tower	1826; 1838	1818	Norfolk Mills	
Hilgay	Ely Road Mill; TL 6210 9795	Smock	1797; 1826	1783	Demolished 1913; Norfolk Mills	
Hilgay	TL 6187 9825	Post	1675; 1824; 1826	1675	1908; Norfolk Mills	
Hilgay	Leflay's Mill; TL 5992 9682	Smock		1853	1904; Norfolk Mills	
Hindolveston	Hindolveston Mill; TG 0360 2950	Post	1826; 1838	1782	Demolished 1844; Norfolk Mills	
Hindolveston	Hindolveston Mill; TG 0361 2924	Tower		1844	Norfolk Mills	
Hindringham	TF 970 355			1759	1759; Norfolk Mills	
Hindringham	Lower Green Mill; TF 9892 3749	Post	1826; 1838	1781	Demolished c. 1844; Norfolk Mills	
Hindringham	Lower Green Mill; TF 9892 3749	Tower		c. 1844	Norfolk Mills	
Hindringham	Thompson's Mill; TF 9820 3720		1797	1776	1839; Norfolk Mills	
Hindringham	The Knoll; TF 9845 3675	Post	1838	1836	1891; Norfolk Mills	
Hindringham	Upper Mill; Graver's City Mill; Summer Green Mill; TF 9805 3590	Tower	1838	1829	Demolished c. 1938; Norfolk Mills	
Hingham	Deopham Road Mill; TG 0324 0074	Post	1797; 1826	1771	Moved to Banham c. 1840 and converted to a Composite mill Norfolk Mills	
Hingham	Deopham Road Mill; TG 0324 0074	Tower		c. 1840	c. 1902; Norfolk Mills	
Hingham				1306	1306; Norfolk Mills	
Hingham	Hardingham Road Mill; TG 0295 0240	Post	1826; 1834	1788	1874; Norfolk Mills	
Hingham	Mill Corner Mill; TG 0261 0180	Tower		1829	Truncated 1973; Norfolk Mills	
Hockering				1317	1317; Norfolk Mills	
Hockering	TG 0854 1491	Tower		1836	Demolished 1960; Norfolk Mills	
Hockwold				1271	1273; Norfolk Mills	
Hockwold				1607	1661; Norfolk Mills	
Hockwold	Mill Lane Mill; TL 7333 8867	Post	1824; 1826; 1834	1822	1857; Norfolk Mills	
Hockwold	Mill Lane Mill; TL 7316 8839	Smock		1822	1911; Norfolk Mills	
Hockwold	Redmoor Mill; TL 6460 8715	Smock	1797; 1824; 1826	1797	1826; Norfolk Mills	
Hoe	TF 9810 1670		1797	1561	1797; Norfolk Mills	
Holkham				1247	1247; Norfolk Mills	
Holme Hale	TF 8862 0835	Post	1834; 1838	1834	1872; Norfolk Mills	
Holme Hale		Smock		1804	1804; Norfolk Mills	
Holme next the Sea	TF 7153 4325		1824	1762	1824; Norfolk Mills	
Holt	Holt Heath Mill; TG 0795 3709	Post		1847	1891; Norfolk Mills	
Holt	Cromer Road Mill; TG 0870 3905	Post	1826	1792	1831; Norfolk Mills	
Holt	Wade's Mill; TG 0740 3800		1797	1794	Burnt down 8 May 1794; Norfolk Mills	
Holt	TG 0765 3900	Tower		c. 1790	Demolished 1970; Norfolk Mills	
Honing	Common Mill; TG 3320 2710	Post	1797; 1826; 1838	1797	1878; Norfolk Mills	
Honing	TG 3195 2795		1797	1797	1797; Norfolk Mills	
Honingham	TG 0985 1140	Post	1797	1788	1803; Norfolk Mills	
Honingham	Honingham Mill; TG 1015 1140	Tower	1826; 1834	1826	Norfolk Mills	
Horning	Mill Loke Mill; TG 3415 1753	Post	1797; 1826	1758	Demolished 1879; Norfolk Mills	
Horning	TG 3425 1740	Post	1797; 1826	1759	1826; Norfolk Mills	
Horningtoft	TF 937 219	Post		1819	1841; Norfolk Mills	
Horsford				1215	1215; Norfolk Mills	
Horsford		Post		1795	1795; Norfolk Mills	
Horsford	TG 1903 1671	Smock	1826	1820	Demolished c. 1865; Norfolk Mills	
Horsford	St Helena Mill; TG 1903 1671	Tower		c. 1865	Norfolk Mills	
Horsham St Faith	Approximately; TG 223 147		1675	1325	1675; Norfolk Mills	
Horsham St Faith	TG 2192 1596		1797; 1826; 1838	1794	c. 1849; Norfolk Mills	
Horsham St Faith	TG 2180 1595	Smock		1849	1891; Norfolk Mills	
Horstead	TG 2575 1980	Post	1826; 1838	1796	Blown down November 1872; Norfolk Mills	
Houghton St Giles	TF 9275 3610	Smock	1797	1775	1797; Norfolk Mills	
Hoveton St John	Belaugh Mill; Hoveton Mill; TG 3000 1884	Post	1797; 1826; 1838	1761	Burnt down June 1881; Norfolk Mills	

=== I ===
Location	Name of mill and grid reference	Type	Maps	First mention or built	Last mention or demise	Photograph
Ingham	Ingham Mill; TG 3916 2512	Post			Blown down (date unknown), new mill built on site in 1763; Norfolk Mills	
Ingham	Ingham Mill; TG 3916 2512	Tower	1797; 1836; 1838	1763	Demolished c. 1872; Norfolk Mills	
Ingham	Mill Farm Mill; TG 3916 2512	Tower		c. 1872	1937, truncated by 1949; Norfolk Mills	
Ingworth				1316	1316; Norfolk Mills	
Islington				1248	1269; Norfolk Mills	

=== K ===
Location	Name of mill and grid reference	Type	Maps	First mention or built	Last mention or demise	Photograph
Kelling	TG 0900 4245	Post	1826; 1838	1821	1904, gone by 1925; Norfolk Mills	
Kenninghall				1276	1276; Norfolk Mills	
Kenninghall				1537	1537; Norfolk Mills	
Kenninghall	Banham Road Mill; TM 040 865	Post		1753	Demolished c. 1782; Norfolk Mills	
Kenninghall	Banham Road Mill; TM 0408 8652	Smock	1797; 1826; 1834; 1838	1783	Demolished 1863; Norfolk Mills	
Kenninghall	Banham Road Mill; TM 0408 8652	Tower		1863	Burnt down c. 1950; Norfolk Mills	
Kenninghall	Chimney Mill; TM 0330 8440	Post	1797; 1826; 1834	1603	1950; Norfolk Mills	
Kenninghall	Fersfield Road mill TM 046 855	Tower		1896	1908; Norfolk Mills	
Kenninghall	Brook's Mill; Lopham Road Mill; TM 0344 8413	Smock	1826; 1834	1823	Blown down 3 August 1879; Norfolk Mills	
Kenninghall	Mill Lane Mill; TM 0427 8605	Post	1826; 1834	c. 1704	Burnt down c. 1950; Norfolk Mills	
Kenninghall	Mill Lane Mill; TM 0425 8602	Tower	1838	1799	Demolished 1911; Norfolk Mills	
Kenninghall	Park Common Mill; TM 0440 8695		1826	1826	1826; Norfolk Mills	
Kettlestone	Kettlestone Mill			1753	1789; Norfolk Mills	
King's Lynn	Blackfriars Road Mill; TF 6230 2010		1675	1675	1675; Norfolk Mills	
King's Lynn	Kettle Mill; TF 6230 2050	Smock		1682	1797; Norfolk Mills	
King's Lynn	Millfleet Mill; TF 6203 1973	Smock		1680	1741 Norfolk Mills	
King's Lynn	South Lynn Mill; TF 6210 1885	Smock		1738	Burnt down 30 July 1737; Norfolk Mills	
King's Lynn	St Ann's Mill; TF 6185 2063	Smock		1683	1725; Norfolk Mills	
King's Lynn	The Walk; TF 624 195	post		1595	1595; Norfolk Mills	
King's Lynn	The Walk; TF 624 195	Post		1667	1725; Norfolk Mills	
King's Lynn	The Walk (2nd mill); TF 624 195	Post		1725	1725; Norfolk Mills	
King's Lynn	West Lynn Mill			1845	1850; Norfolk Mills	
Kirstead	Kirstead Mill; TM 3030 9825		1826	1825	1872; Norfolk Mills	

=== L ===
Location	Name of mill and grid reference	Type	Maps	First mention or built	Last mention or demise	Photograph
Langham	Langham Mill; TG 001 416	Post	1797; 1826; 1834	1797	1872; Norfolk Mills	
Langham	Langham Mill (2nd mill); TG 001 416		1797	1797	1797; Norfolk Mills	
Larling	Larlingford Mill; TL 9700 8870	Post	1797	1797	1823; Norfolk Mills	
Lessingham				16th century	16th century Norfolk Mills	
Letheringsett	TG 0635 3882	Post		c. 1754	1797; Norfolk Mills	
Letton	TF 9755 0520			1685	1685; Norfolk Mills	
Litcham	Mileham Mill; TF 9010 1735	Tower		1854	Norfolk Mills	
Little Cressingham	TF 8745 9990	Smock		1780	1795 (demolished c. 1820?); Norfolk Mills	
Little Cressingham	Little Cressingham Mill; TF 8697 0021	Tower	1826		Norfolk Mills	
Little Ellingham	Rockland Mill	Post		1762	1763; Norfolk Mills	
Little Melton	Little Melton Mill; TG 1580 0685	Tower	1838	1836	Norfolk Mills	
Little Snoring	Snoring Mill; TF 9492 3377	Post	1826	1805	Blown down 1930; Norfolk Mills	
Little Snoring	Jex Farm Mill; TF 9590 3265	Post	1826; 1838	1821	1904; Norfolk Mills	
Loddon	Pye's Mill				Norfolk Mills	
Loddon	Hales Green Mill; TM 3688 9674	Sunk post		Mid-13th century	Mid-13th century Norfolk Mills	
Loddon	Sadd's Mill; Mill Road Mill; TM 3680 9886	Post	1797; 1826	1784	1931; Norfolk Mills	
Loddon	Mill Road Mill; TM 3677 9882	Tower	1826; 1834	1826	1904; Norfolk Mills	
Loddon	Chapman's Mill; Black Mill; TM 3618 9855	Smock	1826	1819	Demolished 1891; Norfolk Mills	
Lopham (North?, or South?)	(two mills)			1301	1305; Norfolk Mills	
Ludham	High Mill; TG 3969 1849	Tower	1797; 1826	1742	Demolished 1975; Norfolk Mills	
Ludham	How Hill Mill; TG 3734 1905	Tower		1825	Norfolk Mills	
Ludham	Lovers Lane Mill; Black Mill; TG 3867 1778	Post	1826	1826	Blown down 24 March 1895; Norfolk Mills	
Ludham	Yarmouth Road Mill; TG 3971 1843	Post			Demolished 1742; Norfolk Mills	
Ludham	St Benet's Abbey Mill; TG 3803 1578	Tower	1749; 1765; 1775; 1797; 1826	c. 1735	Norfolk Mills	

=== M ===
Location	Name of mill and grid reference	Type	Maps	First mention or built	Last mention or demise	Photograph
Marham				1275	1275; Norfolk Mills	
Marham	TF 7104 0985	Smock	1824; 1826	c. 1818	1912; Norfolk Mills	
Marlingford	Bawburgh Road Mill; TG 1385 0935	Tower	1797; 1826; 1834	1783	1836; Norfolk Mills	
Marlingford	Honingham Road Mill; TG 1210 0910	Tower	1838	1836	1883; Norfolk Mills	
Marsham	Mill Farm Mill; TG 2040 2315		1797	1762	1797; Norfolk Mills	
Marsham	TG 2053 2334	Post	1826; 1838	1779	Demolished c. 1897; Norfolk Mills	
Marsham	Hemsby Road Mill; TG 4645 1810	Post			Burnt down c. 1796; Norfolk Mills	
Marsham	Hemsby Road Mill; TG 4651 1810	Post	1797; 1826; 1837	1797	1843; Norfolk Mills	
Martham	Hemsby Road Mill; TG 4651 1805	Tower	1826; 1837	c. 1789	Demolished c. 1914; Norfolk Mills	
Martham	TG 4527 1786	Smock		1853	Burnt down 1 April 1898; Norfolk Mills	
Mattishall					Blown down c. 1740; Norfolk Mills	
Mattishall	Mill Road Mill; TG 0439 1150	Post	1797; 1826; 1834; 1838	1787	Demolished 1856; Norfolk Mills	
Mattishall	Mill Road Mill; TG 0439 1150	Tower		1858	Demolished c. 1900; Norfolk Mills	
Mattishall	Town Lane Mill; TG 0543 1085	Smock	1826; 1838	1826	Demolished 1861; Norfolk Mills	
Mattishall	Mill Street Mill; TG 0543 1085	Tower		1862	1916, gone by 1937; Norfolk Mills	
Mattishall	Norwich Road Mill; TG 0630 1115	Smock	1826; 1834	1819	Demolished 1861; Norfolk Mills	
Mattishall	TG 0485 1100		1797	1797	1797; Norfolk Mills	
Merton	Approximately; TG 902 982			1647	1735; Norfolk Mills	
Methwold	TL 736 946			16th century	16th century Norfolk Mills	
Methwold	Brandon Road Mill; TL 7362 9460	Tower		1875	Demolished 1942; Norfolk Mills	
Methwold				1348	1348; Norfolk Mills	
Methwold	Methwold Hythe; TL 7185 9474	Post	1824; 1826; 1838	1710	Demolished April 1886; Norfolk Mills	
Methwold	Hythe Road Mill; TL 723 943		1826	1813	1846; Norfolk Mills	
Methwold	Old Feltwell Road Mill; TL 7313 9434			1854	Demolished c. 1875; Norfolk Mills	
Methwold	Old Feltwell Road Mill; TL 7313 9434	Tower		1875	1933, gone by 1949; Norfolk Mills	
Middleton	Blackborough End Mill; TF 6642 1460	Tower		1852	Demolished 1933; Norfolk Mills	
Middleton				1305	1305; Norfolk Mills	
Middleton			1675	1675	1675; Norfolk Mills	
Middleton	Mill Farm, North Mill; TF 6692 1583	Post	1675; 1797; 1824; 1826	1675	1834; Norfolk Mills	
Middleton	Mill Farm, South Mill; Great Mill; TF 6695 1560	Post	1797; 1824; 1826	1797	1854; Norfolk Mills	
Mileham	Methwold Common Mill; TF 9015 1736	Post	1675; 1797; 1826; 1838	1675	1902; Norfolk Mills	
Morley St Botolph	TG 0665 0034	Post	1826; 1834	c. 1804	1888; Norfolk Mills	
Moulton St Mary	Black Mill; TG 3944 0618	Post	1797; 1826; 1838	1797	1892; Norfolk Mills	
Moulton St Michael	TM 1590 8870	Post	1797; 1826	1755	Burnt down 5 November 1913; Norfolk Mills	
Mulbarton	TG 1926 0116	Smock	1795; 1826; 1834	1775	Demolished 1949; Norfolk Mills	
Mulbarton	Norwich Road Mill; TG 1990 0193	Tower	1826; 1838	c. 1824	Norfolk Mills	
Mundford	TL 8065 9314	Smock	1824; 1834	1824	1859; Norfolk Mills	
Mundesley	TG 3150 3645		1797	1797	1797; Norfolk Mills	
Mundford	TL 8065 9314	Tower		1846	demolished 1971; Norfolk Mills	
Mundham	Mundham Mill; TM 3332 9866	Post	1797; 1826; 1834	1797	1916, gone by 1937; Norfolk Mills	

=== N ===
Location	Name of mill and grid reference	Type	Maps	First mention or built	Last mention or demise	Photograph
Neatishead	TG 3396 1947	Post	1797	1797	1805, gone by 1817; Norfolk Mills	
Neatishead	Neatishead Mill; TG 3396 1947	Tower	1826	1817	Norfolk Mills	
Necton	TG 8795 0950	Tower	1797; 1826	1782	1911; Norfolk Mills	
Necton	TF 8775 0910	Post				
New Buckenham	TM 0917 9068	Post	1797; 1826	1768	Demolished 1920; Norfolk Mills	
North Creake				1302	1302; Norfolk Mills	
North Creake	North Creake Mill; TF 8530 3823	Tower	1826	1820	Norfolk Mills	
North Elmham	TF 9965 2015		1797	1772	1845; Norfolk Mills	
North Lopham	Tann's Mill; TM 0403 8312	Smock		1805	Demolished November 1926; Norfolk Mills	
North Tuddenham	TG 0468 1394	Post	1797; 1826	1759	Demolished 1923; Norfolk Mills	
North Tuddenham	TG 0345 1355	Post	1797	1797	1797	
North Walsham	Lingate Mill; New Mill; TG 2731 3115	Tower		1856	1904; Norfolk Mills	
North Walsham	Norwich Road Mill	Tower		1841	Demolished April 1940; Norfolk Mills	
North Walsham	Reeves Lane Mill			1839	1896; Norfolk Mills	
North Walsham	Swafield Road Mill; TG 2845 3160	Post	1797; 1826; 1834	1787	1890, gone by 1932; Norfolk Mills	
North Walsham	Yarmouth Road Mill; Field Mill	Post		1841	c. 1906; Norfolk Mills	
Northwold	Manby's Mill; TL 7422 9737		1797; 1824; 1826	1765	1854; Norfolk Mills	
Northwold	TL 7425 9745	Post	1824; 1826	1802	Demolished c. 1875; Norfolk Mills	

=== Norwich ===
Windmills within a 5-mile (8 km) radius of Norwich Castle.

Location	Name of mill and grid reference	Type	Maps	First mention or built	Last mention or demise	Photograph
Bixley	TG 2425 0541	Sunk post			Norfolk Mills	
Bixley	Bixley Mill; TG 2560 0617	Smock	1797	1797	Demolished 1838; Norfolk Mills	
Bixley	Bixley Mill; TG 2560 0617	Tower		1838	Truncated October 1865; Norfolk Mills	
Catton				1471	1570; Norfolk Mills	
Catton	Catton Mill; TG 229 122	Post		1770	1788; Norfolk Mills	
Catton	Catton Mill; TG 2306 1045	Tower		1775	1886; Norfolk Mills	
Cringleford	TG 1945 0600		1797	1795	1795; Norfolk Mills	
Drayton				1331	1331; Norfolk Mills	
Drayton	TG 189 133	Post		1851	1887; Norfolk Mills	
Drayton	TG 1898 1330	Smock		1842	1887; Norfolk Mills	
Eaton	TG 2200 0690		1741; 1797	1741	1797; Norfolk Mills	
Heigham	Heigham Tannery; TG 217 098	Smock		1852	Moved 1863, converted to a drainage mill (location unknown); Norfolk Mills	
Heigham	Crook's Place Mill; New City Mill; TG 2235 0800	Tower		1826	Demolished c. 1890; Norfolk Mills	
Heigham	Mill Hill Mill; TG 2192 0865	Post	1741; 1797	1741	1824, probably demolished 1826; Norfolk Mills	
Heigham	Stone Hills Mill; TG 2110 0930	Post	1741; 1826	1731	1857; Norfolk Mills	
Hellesdon	Marsh Mill; TG 192 117	Smock		c. 1828	Blown down June 1842; Norfolk Mills	
Keswick	Keswick Mill; TG 2140 0520		1797	1766	1834, gone by 1847; Norfolk Mills	
New Catton	Bird's Mill; TG 2248 1052	Tower		1837	1884; Norfolk Mills	
New Catton	Cann's Mill; TG 2245 1043	Tower		1841	1884; Norfolk Mills	
New Catton	Eglington's Mill; TG 2246 1038	Tower		1820s	Demolished September 1872; Norfolk Mills	
New Lakenham	Bracondale Mill; TG 237 074	Tower		1829	Demolished 1890s Norfolk Mills	
New Lakenham	Buck's Mill; Lakenham Mill; TG 2325 0725	Post	1797; 1826; 1830; 1834	1771	1864; Norfolk Mills	
New Lakenham	Butter Hills; TG 237 076	Post	1723	14th century	1723; Norfolk Mills	
New Lakenham	Peafield Mill; TG 2300 0735	Tower	1834; 1838	1824	Norfolk Mills	
Norwich	Carrow Hill, Black Tower; TG 2375 0762	Smock		1778	1810, gone by 1833; Norfolk Mills	
Norwich	Chapelfield Mill; TG 226 084			1343	1343; Norfolk Mills	
Norwich	Magdalen Road Mill; TG 233 099	Post	1797; 1830; 1834	1732	1875; Norfolk Mills	
Norwich	Mile Cross Mill; Batson's Mill; Rose's Mill; TG 2205 1063	Post	1824; 1834; 1838	1822	1900; Norfolk Mills	
Norwich	St Augustine's Gate Mill; TG 2280 0985	Sunk post	1675; 1696; 1723; 1834	1675	1834; Norfolk Mills	
Norwich	St James' Hill Mill; TG 2425 0933	Sunk post	1558; 1581; 1650	1235	1650, gone by 1696; Norfolk Mills	
Norwich	St Stephen's Gate Mill; TG 228 079	Post	1723	1723	Demolished c. 1848; Norfolk Mills	
Pockthorpe	Barre Gate Mill; TG 240 094			1328	1328; Norfolk Mills	
Pockthorpe	Hassett's Mill; TG 240 094	Sunk post	1558; 1611; 1696; 1723	1558	1787; Norfolk Mills	
Pockthorpe	TG 240 094	Post		1787	Burnt down 16 April 1795; Norfolk Mills	
Pockthorpe	TG 234 098			1718	Demolished c. 1769; Norfolk Mills	
Pockthorpe	Jeckell's Mill; TG 234 098	Smock	1797	1769	1803, gone by 1813; Norfolk Mills	
Pockthorpe	Pockthorpe Mill; Bagshaw's Mill; Bayfield's Mill; St Paul's Mill; TG 234 098	Tower	1830; 1834	1813	Demolished 1896; Norfolk Mills	
Sprowston	Austin's Mill; TG 2390 1062	Tower		1850	1906; Norfolk Mills	
Sprowston	Sprowston Saw Mill; TG 239 106	Tower		1850	1864; Norfolk Mills	
Sprowston	Sprowston Mill; Mousehold Mill; TG 2402 1090	Post	1797	1780	Burnt down 24 March 1933; Norfolk Mills	
Sprowston	Sprowston Road Mill; TG 237 106	Post	1834; 1838	1825	Blown down 4 February 1842; Norfolk Mills	
Sprowston	Bond's Mill; TG 2395 1073	Tower		1827	1876; Norfolk Mills	
Thorpe	Gallant's Mill; TG 244 089	Tower		1834	1886; Norfolk Mills	
Thorpe	Mousehold; TG 2343 0903	Smock	1794; 1824	1794	1847, gone by 1854; Norfolk Mills	
Thorpe	Jenning's Mill; TG 2343 0903	Tower		1854	1885; Norfolk Mills	
Thorpe	Mousehold; TG 2460 0883		1750	1750	1750; Norfolk Mills	
Thorpe	Black Mill, Mousehold; TG 2460 0883	Post		1778	Demolished 1841; Norfolk Mills	
Thorpe	Black Mill, Mousehold; TG 2460 0883	Post		1841	1865, gone by 1884; Norfolk Mills	
Thorpe	Plumstead Road Mill; Little Fanny; TG 2473 0940	Tower	1834; 1838	1825	1906; Norfolk Mills	
Trowse	Trowse Mill; TG 252 067	post	1797	1769	1826; Norfolk Mills	
Upper Hellesdon	St Clement's Mill; TG 2225 1027	Post	1741	1741	Demolished or substantially rebuilt 1813; Norfolk Mills	
Upper Hellesdon	St Clement's Mill; TG 2225 1027	Post		1813	Demolished August 1875; Norfolk Mills	
Upper Hellesdon	Press Lane Mill; Witard's Mill; TG 2225 1027	Tower		1875	Demolished 1920; Norfolk Mills	

=== O ===
Location	Name of mill and grid reference	Type	Maps	First mention or built	Last mention or demise	Photograph
Oby	Wiseman's Mill; TG 4092 1381	Tower	1797	1753	Norfolk Mills	
Old Buckenham			1675	1675	1695; Norfolk Mills	
Old Buckenham	Dam Brigg Mill; TM 0825 9015	Post	1797; 1826; 1834	1793	Demolished c. 1912; Norfolk Mills	
Old Buckenham	Fen Street Mill; TM 0547 9230	Post		c. 1864	c. 1864, later removed to Caston; Norfolk Mills	
Old Buckenham	Mill Farm Mill; TM 0605 9130	Post	1826; 1838	1805	1860; Norfolk Mills	
Old Buckenham	Panegryde Mill			13th century	14th century Norfolk Mills	
Old Buckenham	Ringerhose Mill			13th century	14th century Norfolk Mills	
Old Buckenham	Old Buckenham Mill; TM 0623 9099	Tower	1826	1818	Norfolk Mills	
Old Buckenham	Wilby Warren Mill; TM 0575 9028	Post	1797; 1826	1768	1860; Norfolk Mills	
Ormesby St Margaret	Scratby Mill; Field Mill; TG 5060 1480	Post	1826; 1837	1826	Collapsed 22 March 1867; Norfolk Mills	
Ormesby St Margaret	Red Mill; TG 4940 1560	Tower	1826	1826	Demolished c. 1950; Norfolk Mills	
Ormesby St Michael	TG 4860 1455	Post	1797; 1826	1797	Burnt down c. 1914; Norfolk Mills	
Oulton	TG 1480 2930	Post	1797	1780	1797; Norfolk Mills	
Outwell	TF 5170 0305	Smock	1824; 1826	1802	1937; Norfolk Mills	
Outwell	Upwell Mill; TF 5095 0330	Tower		1829		
Ovington	TF 9295 0235	Post	1838	1836	Demolished 1912; Norfolk Mills	
Ovington	TF 9225 0240	Post	1826; 1834	1826	1854; Norfolk Mills	

=== P ===
Location	Name of mill and grid reference	Type	Maps	First mention or built	Last mention or demise	Photograph
Panxworth	TG 3493 1307	Post	1826; 1834	1826	Blown down 18 January 1881; Norfolk Mills	
Panxworth	TG 3493 1307	Post		1881	1891; Norfolk Mills	
Paston	TG 3120 3295	Smock	1797; 1826; 1834	1797	Demolished September 1840; Norfolk Mills	
Paston	Stow Mill; TG 3162 3578	Tower	1838	1827	Norfolk Mills	
Pentney	TF 7032 1285	smock	1824; 1826; 1834	1814	1863; Norfolk Mills	
Plumstead	Plumstead Mill; TG 1238 3455	Post		1711	1784; Norfolk Mills	
Plumstead	Old Mill; TG 1238 3455	Post	1797; 1826	1784	1886; Norfolk Mills	
Plumstead	New Mill; TG 123 345	Post		1839	1886; Norfolk Mills	
Poringland	Porland Mill; TG 2626 0268	Post	1723; 1749; 1750; 1765; 1775; 1797	1723	Demolished c. 1825; Norfolk Mills	
Poringland	Poringland Mill; High Mill; TG 2626 0268	Tower	1826; 1834	1825	Demolished 1906; Norfolk Mills	
Poringland	East Mill; Lower Mill; TG 2675 0200	Smock	1826; 1834; 1838	1826	1873; Norfolk Mills	
Potter Heigham	TG 4141 1875	Post	1797; 1826; 1838	1797	Demolished c. 1849; Norfolk Mills	
Potter Heigham	Potter Heigham Mill; TG 4141 1875	Tower		1849	Norfolk Mills	
Pulham (Market or St Mary?)	(two mills)			Mid-13th century	Mid-13th century Norfolk Mills	
Pulham Market		Post		1861	1879; Norfolk Mills	
Pulham Market	TM 1942 8662	Smock		1825	Demolished 1921; Norfolk Mills	
Pulham St Mary	North Mill; TM 2080 8555		1834; 1837	1829	1892; Norfolk Mills	
Pulham St Mary	South Mill; TM 2074 8532	Post	1797; 1837	1791	1900; Norfolk Mills	
Pulham St Mary	West Mill; TM 2080 8555	Post	1797; 1826; 1834	1797	1838; Norfolk Mills	

=== R ===
Location	Name of mill and grid reference	Type	Maps	First mention or built	Last mention or demise	Photograph
Rackheath				1268	1268; Norfolk Mills	
Ranworth	Ranworth Mill; TG 3608 1415	Post	1797	1759	1797; Norfolk Mills	
Reedham	TG 4220 0205	Tower	1826; 1834	1815	Burnt down 1912; Norfolk Mills	
Reedham		Post		1854	c. 1920; Norfolk Mills	
Reedham	TG 4652 0496	Tower	1797; 1826; 1834	1797	Demolished 1865; Norfolk Mills	
Reedham	Berney Arms Mill; High Mill; TG 4652 0496	Tower		1865	Norfolk Mills	
Reepham	Whitwell Mill; TG 0920 2145		1797	1797	1797; Norfolk Mills	
Repps	Repps Mill; TG 4310 1665	Post	1797; 1826; 1832; 1838	1761	Blown down March 1895; Norfolk Mills	
Repps	Morse's Wind Engine Park; TG 418 179	Two Titt iron wind engines		2008		
Ringland	Ringland Mill; TG 1325 1400	Post	1797; 1826	1770	Demolished March 1859; Norfolk Mills	
Ringstead	North Mill; TF 7053 4170	Post	1797; 1824; 1826; 1834	1780	1859; Norfolk Mills	
Ringstead	South Mill; TF 7056 4161	Post	1797; 1824; 1826; 1834	1749	Moved to Thornham c. 1880; Norfolk Mills	
Ringstead	Ringstead Mill; TF 7056 4161	Tower		1842	Norfolk Mills	
Rockland All Saints				1669	1705; Norfolk Mills	
Rockland All Saints	TL 9928 9717	Tower		c. 1850	Demolished 1920; Norfolk Mills	
Rockland St Andrew	TL 9943 9670	Post	1797	1797	1890; Norfolk Mills	
Rockland St Peter	TL 9848 9954	Tower		c. 1820	1926; Norfolk Mills	
Rollesby				c. 1200	c. 1200; Norfolk Mills	
Rougham	Dekonesmyll; Dykunesmilne (Deacon's Mill)			1330	1330; Norfolk Mills	
Rougham	Hall Mill; Approximately; TF 829 212			13th century	1330; Norfolk mills	
Roughton	Chapel Road Mill; TG 2183 3726	Tower		1845	1889; Norfolk Mills	
Roughton	Mill Hill Mill; TG 216 392	Post		1767	1774; Norfolk Mills	
Roughton	Routon Mill; TG 216 392	Post	1797	1767	Demolished c. 1814; Norfolk Mills	
Roughton	Mill Hill Mill; TG 2162 3923	Post	1797	1734	1797; Norfolk Mills	
Roughton	Mill Hill Mill; TG 2162 3923	Tower	1826	1814	Norfolk Mills	
Roughton					Demolished by 1429; Norfolk Mills	
Roydon	Shelfhanger Road Mill; TM 1130 8064	Post		1847	Demolished c. 1911; Norfolk Mills	
Roydon	Tottington Mill; TM 1075 7962	Post	1783; 1797; 1826	1783	Demolished 1883; Norfolk Mills	

=== S ===
Location	Name of mill and grid reference	Type	Maps	First mention or built	Last mention or demise	Photograph
Saham Toney	Saham Toney Mill; TF 918 019	Tower		1828	Norfolk Mills	
Saham Toney	TF 9010 0340	Post	1797	1797	1797	
Saham Toney	Saham Hills Mill; TF 9014 1312	Post		1884	1884	
Saham Toney	Ashley's Mill; TF 9063 0410	Tower	1797	1797	1797	
Saham Toney	TF 9080 0410	Post	1797	1797	1797	
Salters Lode		Smock	1824; 1826	1824	1949; Norfolk Mills	
Salhouse	TG 3172 1480	Post	1826; 1838	1826	1873; Norfolk Mills	
Salhouse	TG 3070 1420	Tower		1852	1901; Norfolk Mills	
Salthouse				1649	1649; Norfolk Mills	
Salthouse		Smock	1826	1825	1890; Norfolk Mills	
Salthouse	TG 0768 4400	Tower		1841	Destroyed by artillery 1915; Norfolk Mills	
Saxlingham Thorpe	TM 2101 9757			1792	1804; Norfolk Mills	
Saxlingham Thorpe	TM 2101 9757	Tower		1838	Demolished c. 1885; Norfolk Mills	
Scole	Scole Mill; TM 1522 7911	Tower	1826	1799	1908, truncated by 1926; Norfolk Mills	
Scottow				1282	1282; Norfolk Mills	
Scottow				1614	1655; Norfolk Mills	
Scottow	Mill Common Mill; TF 2685 2490	Post	1797; 1826; 1838	1755	Demolished June 1875; Norfolk Mills	
Scoulton				1282	1282; Norfolk Mills	
Scoulton	TL 984 996	Tower				
Sculthorpe	Sculthorpe Mill	Tower	1838	1836	c. 1900; Norfolk Mills	
Sea Palling				12th century	12th century Norfolk Mills	
Sea Palling				1692	1692; Norfolk Mills	
Sea Palling	Sea Palling Mill; TG 4152 2670	Tower	1826; 1838	1792	Norfolk Mills	
Sedgeford	TF 7255 3623				Norfolk Mills	
Sedgeford	TF 7111 3674	Tower	1824; 1826	1824	Demolished 1949; Norfolk Mills	
Sheringham				1573	1590; Norfolk Mills	
Sheringham	TG 1610 4295	Tower	1838	1836	1865; Norfolk Mills	
Shipdham	Market Street Mill		1797	1797	1891; Norfolk Mills	
Shipdham	Mill Road Mill		1797; 1818; 1826	1797	1904; Norfolk Mills	
Shipdham	West End Mill	Post	1797; 1826	1797	1891; Norfolk Mills	
Shropham		Smock		1835	1911; Norfolk Mills	
Shouldham	Fincham Mill; TF 6942 0750	Post	1749; 1765; 1775; 1797; 1826	1749	Demolished 1827; Norfolk Mills	
Shouldham	Shouldham Mill; TF 6942 0750	Tower		1827	1896; Norfolk Mills	
Shouldham	Shouldham Mill; TF 6650 0970		1797	1797	1810; Norfolk Mills	
Shouldham Thorpe	Fodderston Mill; TF 6588 0883		1826	1826	Demolished c. 1830; Norfolk Mills	
Shouldham Thorpe	Fodderston Mill; TF 6588 0883	Tower		1830	Norfolk Mills	
Sidestrand	Black Mill	Smock		1864	Collapsed 1921; Norfolk Mills	
Smallburgh	Wayford Bridge Mill; Dilham Dyke Mill; TG 3440 2480	Tower		1847	Norfolk Mills	
South Creake	Beck Street Mill; TF 8590 3560	Post	1797; 1824	1778	Demolished c. 1866; Norfolk Mills	
South Creake	Common Mill		1749; 1765; 1775; 1797; 1824	1706	1824; Norfolk Mills	
South Creake	Compton Hall Mill; TF 863 358			1844	1844; Norfolk Mills	
South Creake				1253	1253; Norfolk Mills	
Southery		Post		1900	1900	
South Lopham	TM 0265 8148		1797; 1826; 1834	1797	Demolished c. 1905; Norfolk Mills	
South Lopham	Gaol House Mill; TM 0388 7948	Tower	1837	1830	Demolished c. 1925; Norfolk Mills	
South Runcton				1302	1302; Norfolk Mills	
Southtown	High Mill; TM 519 074	Tower		1812	Demolished 1905; Norfolk Mills	
Southtown	Green Cap Mill; TM 517 074	Tower		c. 1815	Burnt down 1898	
Southtown	Water's mill TM 516 077	Post	1783	1783	Moved to Southwold 1798	
Southtown	Halfway House Mill; TM 523 055	Tower	1764	1764	1764	
Southtown	Church Road Mill; TM 526 047	Tower	1826^{*}	1826	1826	
Southtown	Cliff Mill; TM 529 035	Tower	1837	1837	Demolished 1887	
South Walsham	South Walsham Mill	Post		2000	Norfolk Mills	
Sporle	TF 842 111	Tower		1836	1881; Norfolk Mills	
Stalham	Cooke's Mill; TG 3763 2495	Smock		1797	Burnt down 6 January 1903; Norfolk Mills	
Stalham	Staithe Mill; TG 3713 2447	Tower		1836	1926; Norfolk Mills	
Stanhoe		Post			Norfolk Mills	
Stiffkey	TG 9660 4345		1826	1826	1826; Norfolk Mills	
Stiffkey	TG 9660 4345	Tower		1836	1893, gone by 1934; Norfolk Mills	
Stoke Ferry	Stoke Ferry Mill; TF 7014 0049		1824	1824	Demolished 1860s	
Stoke Ferry	Stoke Ferry Mill; TF 7014 0049	Tower		1860s	Norfolk Mills	
Stoke Ferry	TF 6995 0045	Post		1758	1861	
Stokesby	Stokesby Mill; Trett's Mill; TG 4295 1067	Tower		1826	Norfolk Mills	
Stow Bedon		Smock		1875	1875; Norfolk Mills	
Stratton St Mary	Rayner's Mill; TM 1975 9300	Smock		1854	1887; Norfolk Mills	
Stratton St Michael	Mill Farm Mill; TM 2085 9500	Post	1675; 1797; 1826	1675	1826; Norfolk Mills	
Stratton St Michael	TM 2071 9218	Post	1826; 1838	1826	1870; Norfolk Mills	
Stratton St Michael	Leeder's Mill; Long Stratton Mills; TM 2071 9209	Tower	1826	1826	Norfolk Mills	
Strumpshaw		Smock	1749	1749	c. 1915; Norfolk Mills	
Sutton	TG 3956 2387	Tower	1797	1762	Burnt down 1861	
Sutton	Sutton Mill; TG 3956 2387	Tower		1861	Norfolk Mills	
Sutton	TG 3956 2375		1826	1826	1826; Norfolk Mills	
Swaffham	North Pool Mill	Smock		1836	1895; Norfolk Mills	
Swaffham	Kidallsmill Farm; TF 8305 0975	Post	1675; 1797; 1824; 1826; 1832; 1834	1675	Demolished 1881; Norfolk Mills	
Swanton Abbot	TG 2679 2493				Norfolk Mills	
Swanton Abbot	TG 2633 2671	Tower		c. 1845	1926; Norfolk Mills	
Swanton Morley	TG 0186 1719	Post	1797	1795	Demolished 1906; Norfolk Mills	

=== T ===
Location	Name of mill and grid reference	Type	Maps	First mention or built	Last mention or demise	Photograph
Terrington St Clement	Balsam Fields Mill; Walker's Mill; TF 5518 1882	Tower		1841	Demolished February 1908; Norfolk Mills	
Terrington St Clement	Orange Farm Mill; TF 5408 1948	Tower				
Terrington St Clement	Lynn Road Mill; TF 5582 2013	Post				
Terrington St John		Tower		1836	1912; Norfolk Mills	
Tharston	TM 1845 9575	Post		1806	1810; Norfolk Mills	
Tharston	TM 1845 9575	Tower		1896	1939, gone by 1945; Norfolk Mills	
Thetford	Holland's Mill	Post			Collapsed April 1818 whilst being moved.	
Thompson		Post	1797; 1826	1797	Demolished 1913; Norfolk Mills	
Thornham	TF 7283 4380	Composite		c. 1880	Demolished November 1930; Norfolk Mills	
Thornham	TF 7295 4262		1797	1797	1797; Norfolk Mills	
Thornham	TF 7283 4380		1826	1821	Demolished 1886; Norfolk Mills	
Thrigby	Thrigby Mill; TG 4682 1207	Post	1797; 1826	c. 1792	Demolished 1892; Norfolk Mills	
Thrigby	Thrigby Mill; TG 4682 1207	Post		1983	Norfolk Mills	
Thurgarton	TG 1857 3575	Post	1797; 1826	1779	1950; Norfolk Mills	
Thurlton	Thurlton Mill; Haddiscoe Mill; TM 4212 9743	Post	1797; 1826; 1834	1792	1908; Norfolk Mills	
Thurlton	Great Goliath Mill; TM 4135 9835	Tower	1826	1806	1937, truncated by 1949; Norfolk Mills	
Thurning	Union Mills; TG 0650 3070		1826	1826	1861; Norfolk Mills	
Thursford	TF 9874 3417		1797; 1826	1782	1851; Norfolk Mills	
Tibenham				1303	1303; Norfolk Mills	
Tibenham	TM 1287 8985	Post	1797; 1826; 1834	1794	c. 1891; Norfolk Mills	
Tilney Fen End		Post			Collapsed 22 February 1908	
Tittleshall	TF 8895 2090	Post		1872	Demolished 1912; Norfolk Mills	
Tivetshall St Mary	TM 1762 8571		1675; 1797; 1826; 1834; 1837	1675	1845; Norfolk Mills	
Tivetshall St Margaret	TM 1653 8627	Tower		c. 1851	Demolished c. 1942; Norfolk Mills	
Toftwood	Toftwood Mill; TF 9882 1094		1781; 1826	1778	Demolished c. 1928; Norfolk Mills	
Topcroft	TM 2654 9355	Post	1838	1838	1933; Norfolk Mills	
Tottenhill	TF 6375 1095	Post	1824; 1826; 1834	1760	Demolished 1961; Norfolk Mills	
Tunstall		Post		1910	1910; Norfolk Mills	

=== U ===
Location	Name of mill and grid reference	Type	Maps	First mention or built	Last mention or demise	Photograph
Upper Sheringham	Sheringham Mill; TG 1495 4101	Post	1797	1575	c. 1922; Norfolk Mills	
Upper Sheringham	TG 1498 4103	Post	1775; 1797	1575	Demolished c. 1822; Norfolk Mills	
Upton	Upton Mill; TG 3967 1249	Tower		1783	Demolished c. 1890; Norfolk Mills	
Upwell	TF 495 020	Post	1824	1824	1824	
Upwell	TF 496 022	Post	1824	1824	1824	
Upwell	Lot's Bridge Mill; TL 5120 9915		1797	1797	1797	
Upwell	Sander's Mill; Shepherd's Mill; TF 508 033	Tower		1829	Norfolk Mills	

=== W ===
Location	Name of mill and grid reference	Type	Maps	First mention or built	Last mention or demise	Photograph
Walpole St Peter	Walpole St Peter Highway; Cooper's Mill; TF 5155 1426	Tower		1766	Norfolk Mills	
Walpole St Peter	Waterdown Green Mill; TF 4986 1613	Post		1885	1885	
Watlington	Watlington Mill	Tower		1864	1904; Norfolk Mills	
Wells next the Sea	Blacks Lane Mill; TF 8435 4400	Post		Early 19th century	Moved to Burnham Overy Staithe c. 1805; Norfolk Mills	
Wells next the Sea		Tower	1826	1826	1906; Norfolk Mills	
Westacre		Post			Demolished June 1870; Norfolk Mills	
West Bradenham	TF 9230 0880	Smock	1838	1826	1879; Norfolk Mills	
West Dereham	TF 6655 0400	Post	1797; 1826	1797	1858; Norfolk Mills	
West Newton		Post	1824; 1826	1824	1875; Norfolk Mills	
West Raynham	Raynham Mill; TF 8708 2460	Post	1797; 1826; 1834; 1838	1750	Demolished c. 1845; Norfolk Mills	
West Walton	Fen End Mill; Dobb's Mill; Sutterby's Mill; TF 5025 1175	Tower	1824	1740	Norfolk Mills	
West Walton	Ingleborough Mill; TF 4739 1499	Tower		1824	Norfolk Mills	
Westwick	Westwick Hall	Titt iron wind engine		1893		
West Winch	West Winch Mill; TF 6313 1678	Tower		c. 1821	Norfolk Mills	
Weybourne	TG 1100 4335	Post		1723	1916; Norfolk Mills	
Weybourne	Weybourne Mill; TG 1152 4314	Tower		1850	Norfolk Mills	
Wheatacre	Burgh Mill	Post		1601	1839; Norfolk Mills	
Whissonsett	North Mill	Post		1891	Burnt down 1912; Norfolk Mills	
Whissonsett	South Mill	Post		c. 1814	Burnt down c. 1912; Norfolk Mills	
Wicklewood	Old Mill; TG 0682 0257	Tower		1844	c. 1902; Norfolk Mills	
Wicklewood	Wicklewood Mill; TG 0765 0265	Tower		1845	Norfolk Mills	
Wighton	Wighton Mill; TF 9395 3936	Tower	1797	1786	1939, gone by 1945; Norfolk Mills	
Wighton	Old Mill; TF 9450 3880	Post	1797	1797	1797	
Winfarthing	TM 1093 8518	Smock		1828	Demolished 1937; Norfolk Mills	
Winfarthing	Shelfanger Road Mill; TM 1090 8415	Post			Demolished April 1871.	
Winterton-on-Sea	Winterton Mill	Post		c. 1700	Blown down April 1902; Norfolk Mills	
Witton				1841	1881; Norfolk Mills	
Witton	Ridlington Mill; TG 3488 3231	Post	1797	1763	Demolished c. 1809; Norfolk Mills	
Witton	Witton Mill; TG 3488 3231	Post	1826	c. 1809	Demolished c. 1924; Norfolk Mills	
Witton	TG 3130 2985	Post	1797	1797	1797	
Wiveton				1349	1349; Norfolk Mills	
Wiveton	Wiveton Mill; TG 0395 4300	Post	1797	1586	1797; Norfolk Mills	
Wiveton	South Mill; TG 0405 4270	Post	1826; 1838	1825	Demolished August 1850; Norfolk Mills	
Wiveton	Blakeney Mill; TG 0332 4394	Tower	1797	1769	Norfolk Mills	
Woodton	TM 291 939	Post	1797; 1826	1797	c. 1925, gone by 1935; Norfolk Mills	
Wood Norton	TG 0150 2963	Post	1826	1815	1833; Norfolk Mills	
Wood Norton	TG 0150 2963	Smock		c. 1834	1892; Norfolk Mills	
Worstead	TG 3140 2745	Tower	1797	1797	1797	
Worstead	Briggate Mill; TG 3140 2745			1790s	1790s Norfolk Mills	
Worstead	Briggate Mill; Worstead Mill; TG 3105 2760	Tower		c. 1850		
Wramplingham	TG 1090 0640		1797	1773	1797; Norfolk Mills	
Wreningham	Wreningham Mill; TM 1647 9815	Post	1797; 1826; 1834	1797	1937; Norfolk Mills	
Wymondham	North Mill; TG 1082 0235	Smock		1858	Burnt down 17 February 1950; Norfolk Mills	
Wymondham	Silfield Mill; TG 128 001	Tower		c. 1850	Norfolk Mills	
Wymondham	TG 1075 0245	Tower				
Wymondham	Browick Mill; TG 1150 0145	Post				
Wymondham	Browick Mill; TG 1150 0145	Smock				
Wymondham	Silfield Mill; TG 1165 0080	Post				
Wymondham	Norwood Common Mill; TG 1360 0325	Post				
Wymondham	Wymondham Common Mill; TG 1360 0325	Post				
Wymondham	Suton Mill; TM 0860 9815	Post				

=== Y ===
Location	Name of mill and grid reference	Type	Maps	First mention or built	Last mention or demise	Photograph
Yaxham	TG 0132 1045	Post	1826	1810	1904, gone by 1917; Norfolk Mills	
Yaxham	TG 0250 1155	Smock		1845	1860; Norfolk Mills	
Yaxham	Yaxham Mill; TG 0132 1045	Tower		1860	Norfolk Mills	

== Maps ==
- 1675 Ogilvy
- 1736 John Kirby
- 1749 Emanuel Bowen
- 1765 Corbridge
- 1775 Bowles
- 1783 Hodskinson
- 1797 Faden
- 1824 Ordnance Survey
- 1826 Bryant
- 1826^{*} Bryant
- 1834 Greenwood
- 1837 Ordnance Survey
- 1838 Ordnance Survey

== Notes ==
Mills in bold are still standing, known building dates are indicated in bold. Text in italics denotes indicates that the information is not confirmed, but is likely to be the case stated.

Mills in locations that were absorbed from Suffolk in 1974 are listed under the List of windmills in Suffolk.

== Sources ==
Unless indicated otherwise, the source for all entries is the individual pages linked to the Norfolk Mills website and/or Apling, Harry (1984). Norfolk Corn Windmills. Norwich: The Norfolk Windmills Trust. ISBN 0-9509793-0-9.. Where information given on the Norfolk Mills entry is not readily verifiable on that page, it has been checked as correct by reference to Apling's book.
