= East Wretham Windmill =

Windmill in East Wretham, Norfolk, England

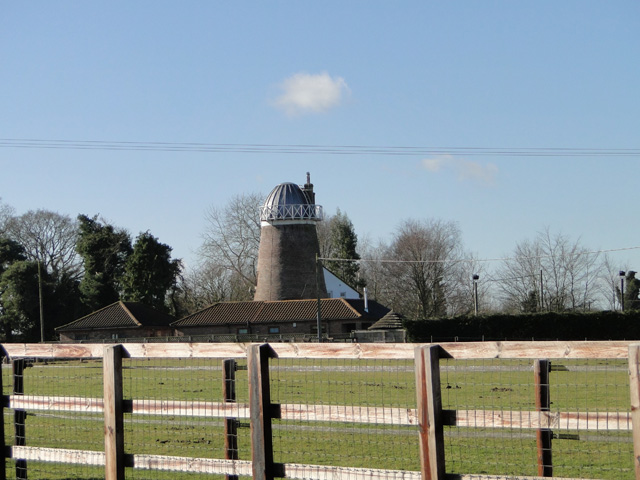
- The converted mill
- Interactive map of East Wretham Windmill

Origin
- Mill name: East Wretham Mill
- Mill location: TL 9251 9057
- Coordinates: 52°28′44.88″N 0°50′00.29″E
- Operator: Private
- Year built: c1875

Information
- Purpose: Corn
- Type: Tower mill
- Storeys: Four storeys
- No. of sails: Four sails
- Type of sails: Double Patent sails
- Windshaft: Cast iron
- Winding: Fantail
- No. of pairs of millstones: Two pairs

East Wretham Mill is a tower mill at East Wretham, Norfolk, England which has been converted to residential accommodation.

== History ==
East Wretham Mill was first mentioned in an advert in 1875, when it was described as "newly erected". A mill had been marked on the site in 1826 when it appeared on Bryant's map. Millers are recorded at this mill up to 1872. Edmund Land was the miller in 1878, having previously been at Stow Bedon smock mill. Walter Weggett was the next miller He was followed by Walter Littleproud in 1883.

The mill was derelict by 1926 and was converted to residential accommodation c1958.

== Description ==
East Wretham Mill is a four-storey tower mill which had a domed cap which was winded by a fantail. The mill had four double Patent sails, one pair of which had eight bays of three shutters. The tower is 32 feet (9.75 m) to the curb. The mill drove two pairs of French Burr millstones.

== Millers ==
- Edmund Land 1878
- Walter Weggett 1879–81
- Walter Littleproud 1883-

Reference for above:-
