= Norwich Road Mill, Mulbarton =

Windmill in Mulbarton, Norfolk, England

- Interactive map of Norwich Road Mill, Mulbarton

Origin
- Mill name: Norwich Road Mill
- Grid reference: TG 1990 0193
- Coordinates: 52°34′14″N 1°14′36″E
- Year built: 1820s

Information
- Purpose: Corn Mill
- Type: Tower mill
- No. of sails: Four
- Type of sails: Patent sails
- Windshaft: Cast iron
- Winding: Fantail
- Fantail blades: Six
- Auxiliary power: Steam engine
- Size of millstones: Two pairs

Norwich Road Mill is a tower mill in Mulbarton, Norfolk, United Kingdom. Built in the 1820s, it worked until at least 1908. The empty tower survives.

== History ==
Norwich Road Mill was built c.1824, being marked on Bryant's map of Norfolk, which was surveyed 1824–26. It was advertised for sale in September 1827, described as "lately erected". Samuel Barrell was the miller until c.1846. He was followed by William Barrell from 1853 to 1856 then William Crane from 1863–64. The mill was to let in 1865. It was the owned by Samuel Barrell of Little Melton Windmill. Robert Ellis was the miller from 1865 to 68, then William Smith Green from 1872 to 1883. Green installed a steam engine as auxiliary power. George Kent was the miller from 1888 until his bankruptcy in 1890. William George Higgins and Henry Hart were the millers from 1892 to 1904, then Hart alone until 1908. Alfred Thompson, who ran the smock mill in Mulbarton, then ran the milll.

The mill had ceased working by 1926. A photograph shows that the shutters had then been removed from the sails. The mill was in a similar condition when painted by Karl Wood in 1933. It had lost a sail and the fantail by 1937. Arthur C. Smith surveyed the mill on 21 May 1973. At that time it was a shell with only the floor beams surviving. The mill stood in a yard for scrap cars. The empty tower survives.

== Description ==
Norwich Road Mill is a three storey tower mill. The tower is about 27 feet 0 inches (8.23 m) tall. It had a boat shaped cap with a petticoat. Four double patent sails were carried on a cast iron windshaft. The mill was winded by a six-bladed fantail. It took 733 turns of the fantail to turn the cap through 360°. Two pairs of millstones were driven.
