= Silfield Mill, Wymondham =

Windmill in Norfolk, England

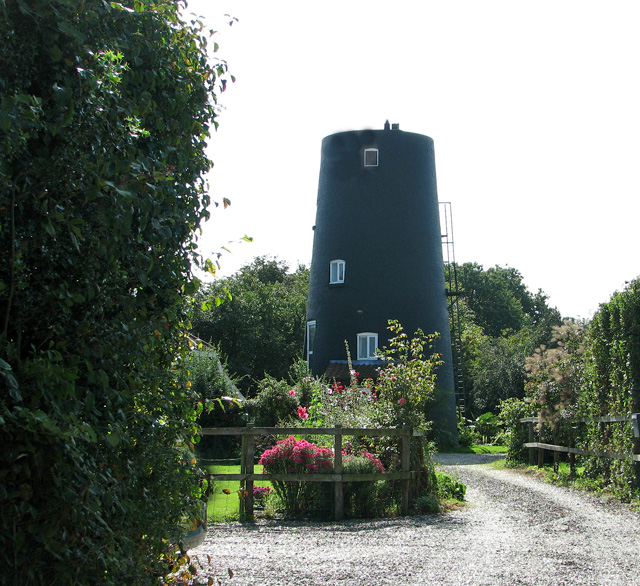
- Silfield Mill, September 2011
- Interactive map of Silfield Mill, Wymondham

Origin
- Mill name: Silfield Mill
- Mill location: Wymondham, Norfolk, United Kingdom
- Grid reference: TG 1280 0008
- Coordinates: 52°33′23″N 1°08′17″E
- Year built: C.1850

Information
- Purpose: corn mill
- Type: Tower mill
- Storeys: Five storeys
- No. of sails: Four
- Auxiliary power: Steam engine
- No. of pairs of millstones: Two pairs

Silfield Windmill is a tower mill in Wymondham, Norfolk, United Kingdom. It was built c. 1850 and worked until 1911. The derelict mill was converted to residential use in 1981.

== History ==
Silfield Mill was built c.1850. William Jermyn was the first miller. Henry Banham was the miller from 1875 to 1879, followed by Henry William Jermyn in 1883. He had added a steam mill to the windmill by 1888. Jermyn left in 1906 and the mill was taken by Walter Farrow, who also had Wicklewood Windmill. He ran the mill until 1911. The mill was then dismantled, with the cast iron brake wheel, and a Peak bedstone being installed in Wicklewood Windmill.

The mill subsequently became derelict. It was offered for sale in 1979. Planning permission was obtained to convert the mill to residential use. This was completed in October 1981.

== Description ==
Silfield Mill is a five storey tower mill. The tower is about 36 feet (11 m) tall and is 17 feet 0 inches (5.18 m) internal diameter at ground floor level. The walls are 18 inches (460 mm) thick. Two pairs of millstones were driven underdrift.
