= East Runton Windmill =

Windmill in East Runton, Norfolk, England

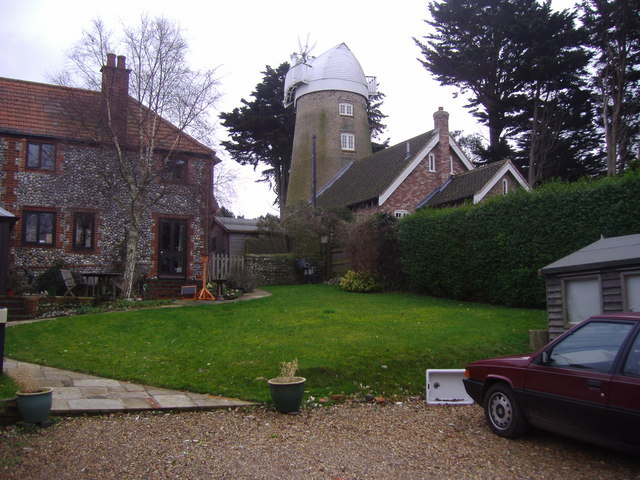
- East Runton Windmill, January 2008
- Interactive map of East Runton Windmill

Origin
- Mill name: East Runton Mill
- Mill location: TG 2005 4229
- Coordinates: 52°55′58.56″N 1°16′22.39″E
- Operator: Private
- Year built: 1820s

Information
- Purpose: Corn mill
- Type: Tower mill
- Storeys: Five storeys
- No. of sails: Four sails
- Type of sails: Double Patent sails
- Winding: Fantail
- Fantail blades: Six blades
- No. of pairs of millstones: Three pairs

East Runton Windmill is a grade II listed tower mill at East Runton, Norfolk, England which has been converted to residential accommodation.

== History ==
The first record of this windmill is its appearance on Bryant’s map of Norfolk published in 1826. The mill was owned by Joseph Baker in 1836 following his marriage with Susan Dawson in 1804. He was a miller and brickmaker. The mill was to let in 1843. On 1 November 1860 a fifteen year old girl named Martha Holman was struck by one of the sails and knocked unconscious. The mill was working until at least 1908, when Ronald Hall was the miller, but it was derelict in 1926.

The mill still had a cap in 1937, but the sails and fantail had been removed by then. By 1949, the mill had been stripped of machinery. The tower retained the remains of the cap frame in 1984. In 2003, the mill was converted to residential accommodation, with a new cap and fantail added.

== Description ==
East Runton Windmill is a five storey tower mill with a stage at second floor level. It has a boat shaped cap with a gallery, winded by a fantail. The mill had four double Patent sails and drove three pairs of millstones. The tower is 38 feet (11.58 m) to curb level.

== Millers ==
- Joseph Baker 1836-43
- George Waterson 1845-46
- Joseph Baker 1841-56
- Stephen Millet 1858-59
- James Kemp 1860-1904
- Ronald Hall 1908

Reference for above:-

== Gallery ==
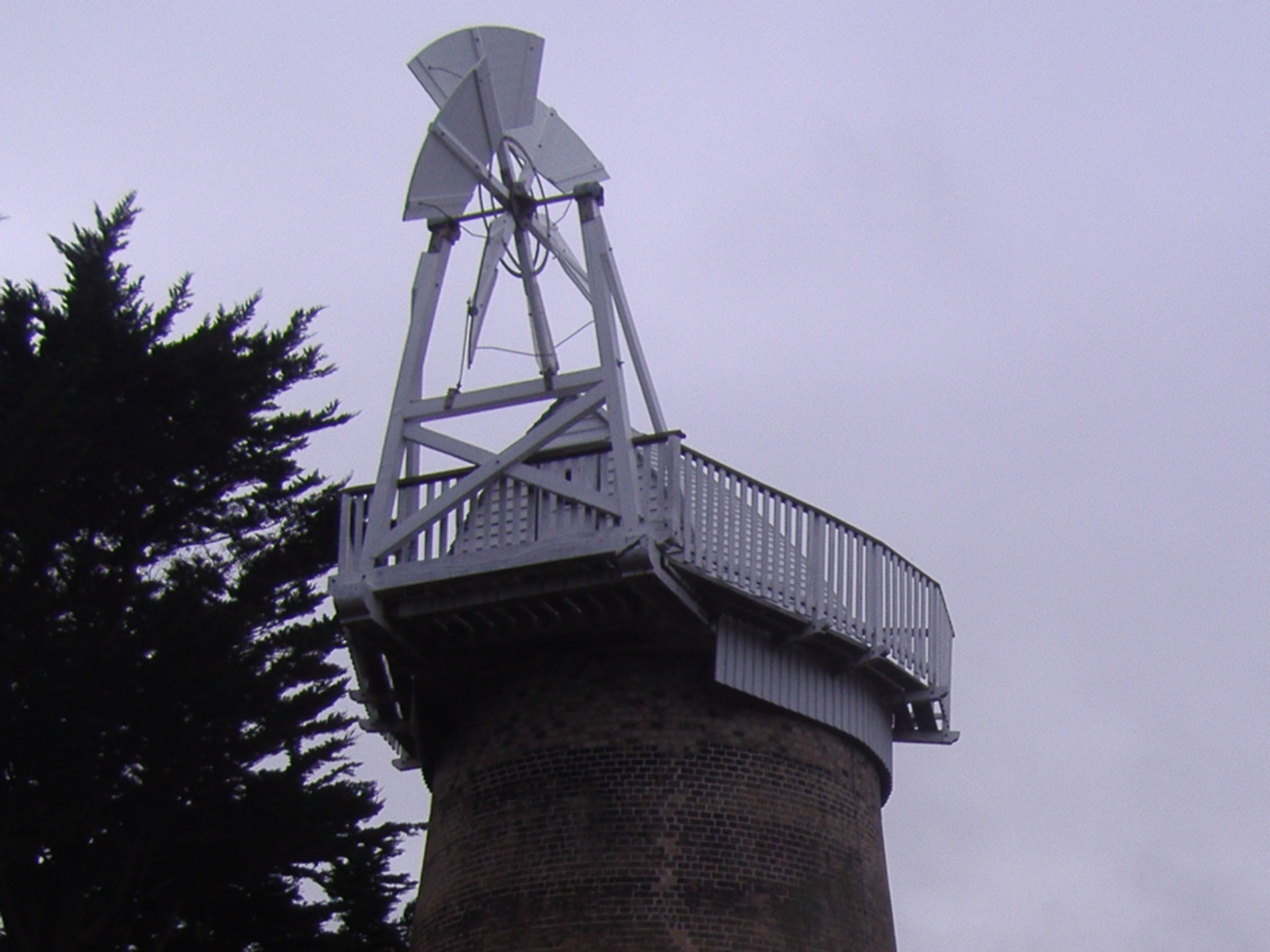
The Norfolk style cap with six-bladed fan

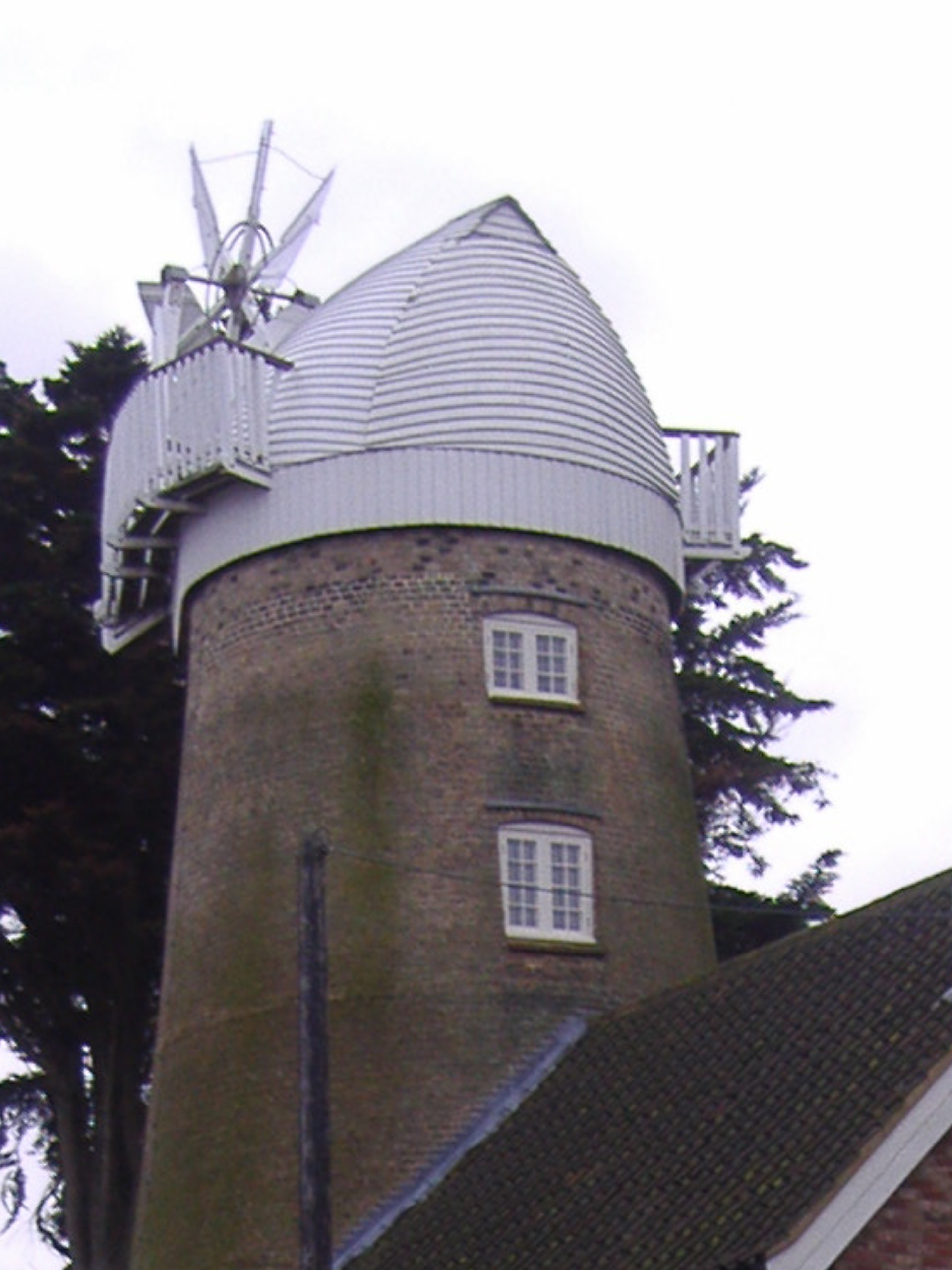
The east elevation of the mill

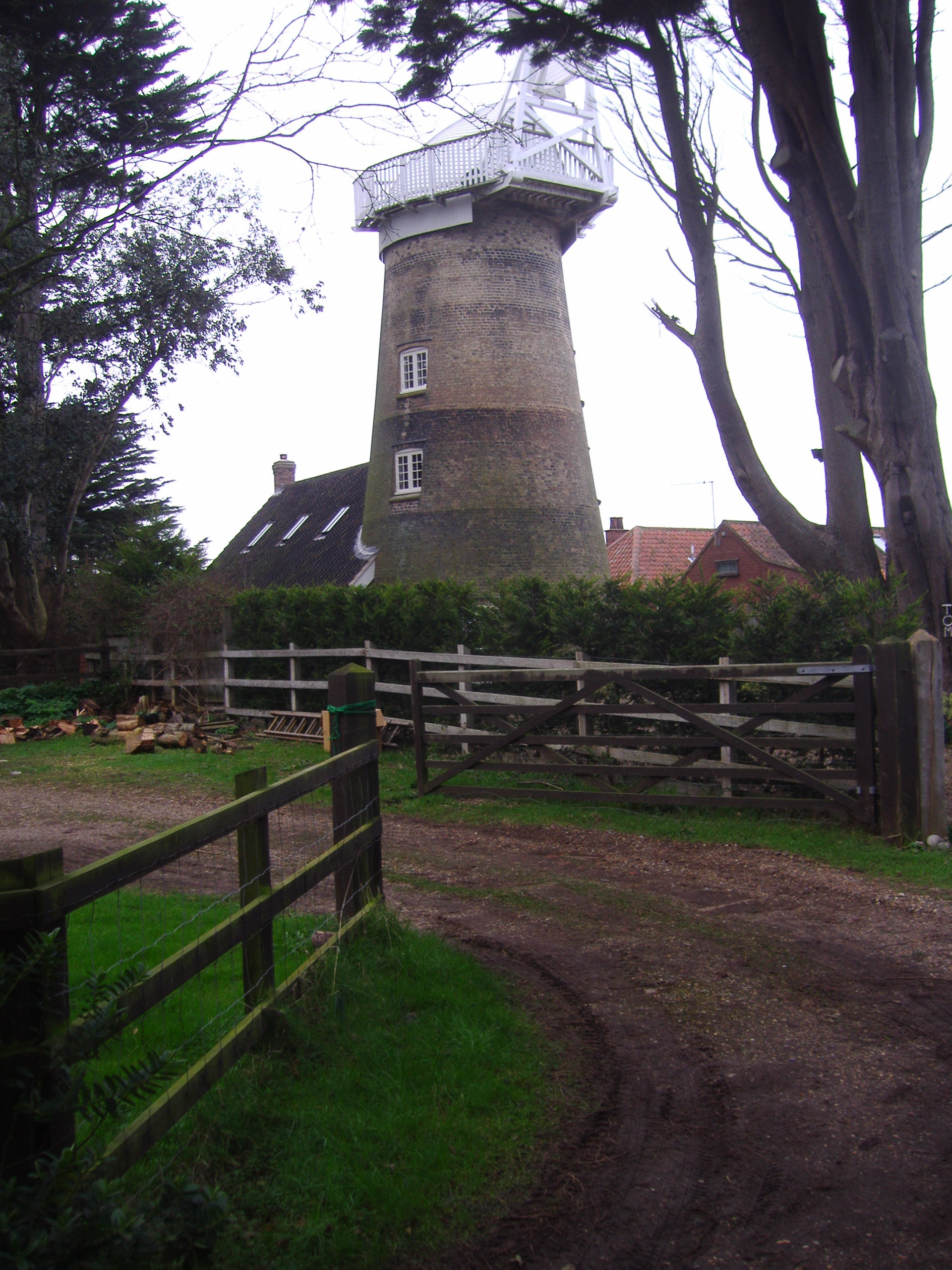
East Runton Windmill

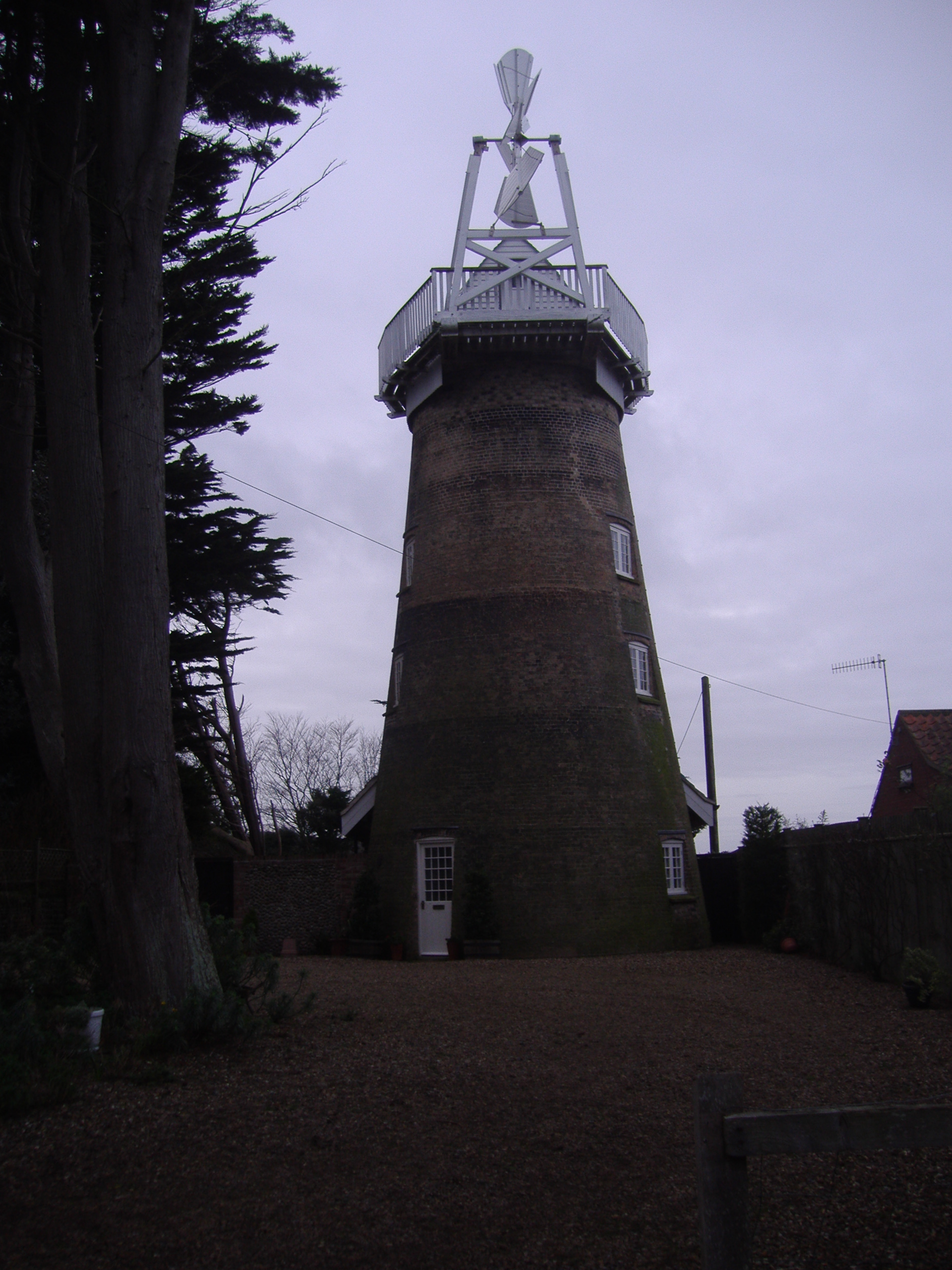
East Runton Windmill
