= Ingleborough Tower Windmill, West Walton =

Windmill in West Walton, Norfolk, England

West Walton, Ingleborough Tower Windmill
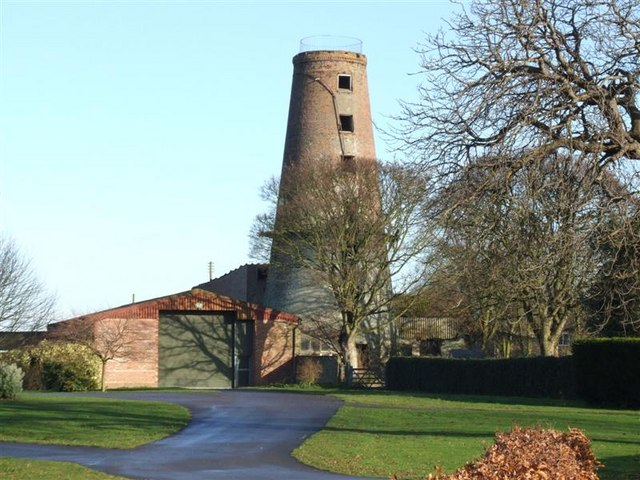
- Ingleborough Towermill, near the village of West Walton
- Interactive map of West Walton, Ingleborough Tower Windmill

Origin
- Mill location: Mill Lane, West Walton
- Grid reference: TF47391499
- Coordinates: 52°42′45.04″N 0°10′49.08″E
- Year built: 1824

Ingleborough Tower Windmill is one mile north of the village of West Walton in Norfolk, England. The windmill is in the yard of Hill House Farm alongside a house and assorted farm buildings. The mill is now in a state of disuse. The mill tower was listed Grade II in 1951.

The mill was built in 1824. It stood over eight storeys high and is constructed from brick. At the fourth floor level there is a gallery. There are windows on each floor, with three windows on the south elevation. At its top there is a sawtooth cornice in brickwork, below curb track. The tower was topped with a white ogee cap which has been removed. A set of railings was installed around the top in 1980. The sails, of which there were once six, were removed in 1940. Internally the tower still has all its floors and stairs but all the machinery has been removed.

The mill is listed in the 1883 Kelly’s Directory for Cambridgeshire, Norfolk & Suffolk, with the miller who was also a baker and farmer. In 1904, the mill was powered by both wind and steam.
