= Neatishead Windmill =

Windmill in Neatishead, Norfolk, England

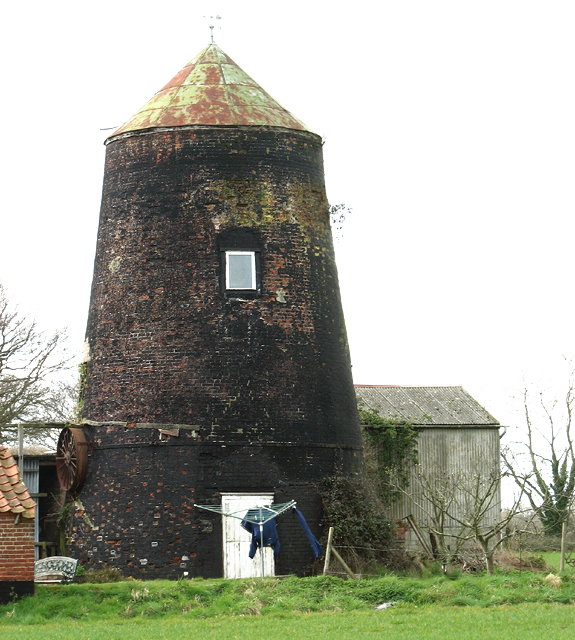
- Neatishead Windmill, April 2016
- Interactive map of Neatishead Windmill

Origin
- Mill name: Neatishead Windmill
- Mill location: Neatishead, Norfolk, United Kingdom
- Grid reference: TG 3396 1947
- Coordinates: 52°43′20″N 1°27′47″E
- Year built: 1810s

Information
- Purpose: Corn mill
- Type: Tower mill
- Storeys: Four storeys
- No. of sails: Four
- Type of sails: Common sails, later Patent sails
- Windshaft: cast iron
- Winding: Tailpole or winch, later fantail
- Fantail blades: Six
- Auxiliary power: Steam engine, later diesel engine
- No. of pairs of millstones: Two pairs

Neatishead Windmill is a Grade II listed tower mill in Neatishead, Norfolk, United Kingdom. It was built in the 1810s and worked by wind until the 1930s, then by engine into the 1970s. The tower survives, with some machinery.

== History ==
There was a windmill in Neatishead c.circa1658. The first mill on the site was a post mill which was marked on Faden's 1797 map of Norfolk. Miller William Ebbs was bankrupt in 1805. The post mill had been replaced by a tower mill by 1817. The mill was offered for sale in 1827. At this time it had Common sails and was winded by hand. William Hammond was owner and miller in 1836. He offered the mill for sale by auction in June 1837 and to let in October 1837. The mill was offered to let in September 1845. A fantail had recently been fitted. The mill may have been fitted with Patent sails around this date. Charles Harris was the miller from 1846 to 1858, followed by Samuel Grapes until 1861.

The mill was sold by auction in September 1861 to Bower Sparkhall Sheppard. He worked the mill until 1871. The mill was offered for sale by auction in February 1871, but was leased by Joseph Page from 1872 to 1874. Thomas Knights was the miller from 1874 to 1885. A steam engine had been installed as auxiliary power by 1885. Jacob Scarland bought the mill in 1885, working it until 1906. The mill was sold by auction for £430 in September 1906 to J. Wisbey, who paid £50 for the mill's portable engine. James Lockett was the miller from 1906 to 1938. By 1931, the mill was being worked on two sails, assisted by the steam engine. Ernest George Blackburn bought the mill in 1938. The mill had ceased working by wind by c.1940. The shutters from all but the inner two bays of the sails had been removed. A diesel engine had been installed as auxiliary power by 1949. The cap had been removed by 1971 and the tower capped with a conical roof. Blackburn's grandson, Michael Gordon Harvey was working the mill in 1974. The mill was listed Grade II on 12 May 1987. The tower survives, retaining some machinery.

== Description ==
Neatishead Windmill is a four storey tower mill. It had a boat shaped cap with a gallery and petticoat. As built, it had four Common sails 31 feet 6 inches (9.60 m) long. It was originally winded by hand. The mill later had four double Patent sails. The outer pair had seven bays of three shutters and one bay of one shutter. The inner pair had seven bays of three shutters and one bay of two shutters on the leading edge. They had one bay of five shutters, one bay of four shutters, five bays of three shutters and one bay of two shutters on the trailing edge. The mill was originally winded by hand, either a tailpole or a winch being used. Latterly, it was winded by a six-bladed fantail. the upright shaft and great spur wheel were wooden. Two pairs of French Burr millstones were driven underdrift.
