= Fen End Mill, West Walton =

Windmill in West Walton, Norfolk, England

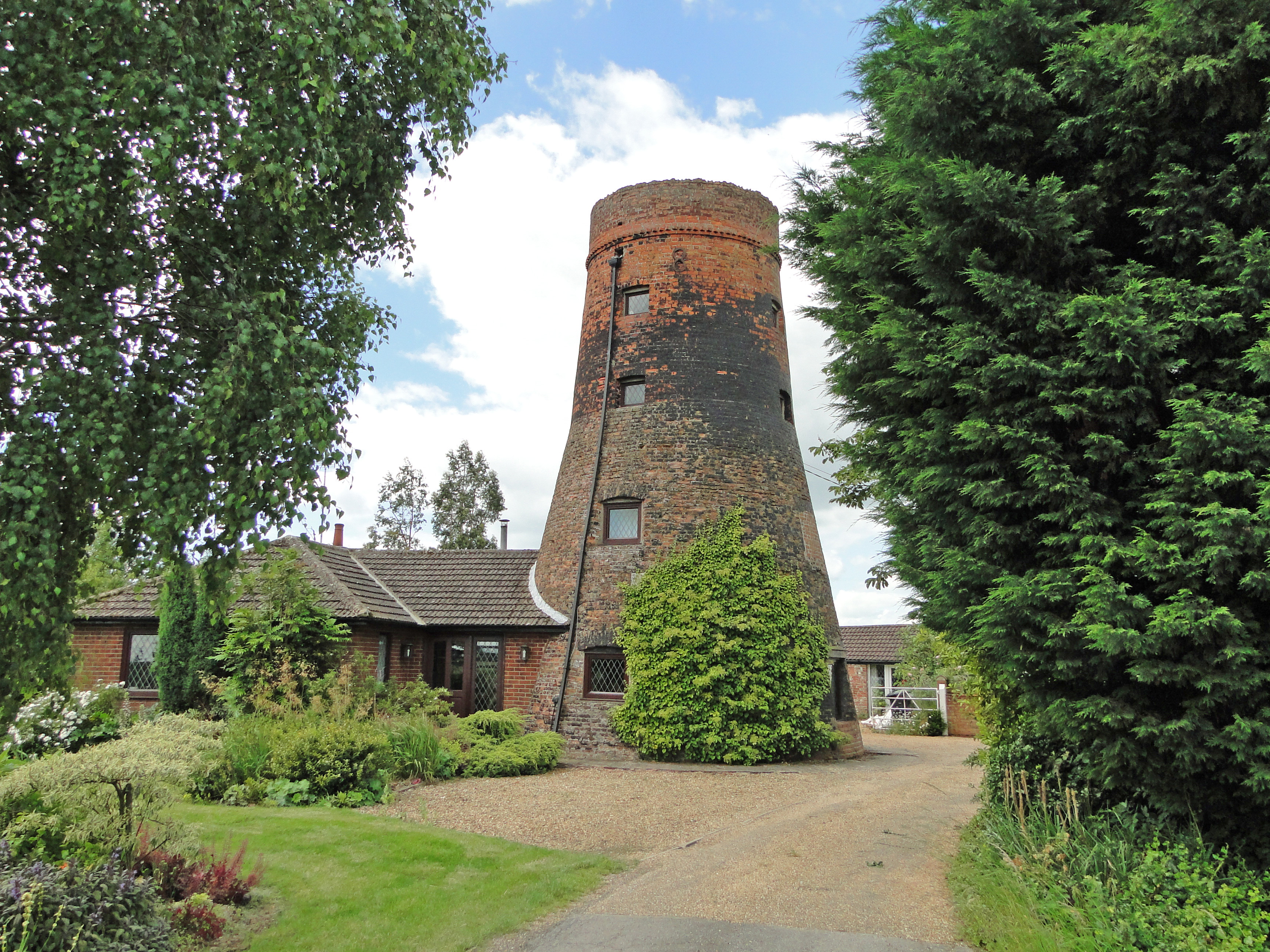
- Fen End Mill, July 2019
- Interactive map of Fen End Mill, West Walton

Origin
- Mill name: Fen End Mill, Dobb's Mill, Sutterby's Mill
- Mill location: West Walton, Norfolk, United Kingdom
- Grid reference: TF 5025 1175
- Coordinates: 52°40′59″N 0°13′17″E
- Year built: 18th Century

Information
- Purpose: Corn mill
- Type: Tower mill
- Storeys: Five storeys
- No. of sails: Four
- Windshaft: Cast iron
- Winding: Fantail
- Auxiliary power: Steam engine
- No. of pairs of millstones: Three pairs

Fen End Mill, or Dobb's Mill or Sutterby's Mill, is a Grade II listed tower mill in West Walton, Norfolk, United Kingdom. Built in the 18th Century, it was heightened in 1815. The mill worked by wind until 1908. It was converted to residential use in the 1970s.

== History ==
Fen End Mill was built in the 18th Century. William Moore was the miller in 1740. John Dobbs was the miller in 1802. He had the tower raised by two floors in 1815. His son, John, was the miller from 1836 to 1863. Daniel Sutterby was the miller in 1864. The mill was offered for sale by auction in June 1886 following the death of its owner Charles Hubbard. Sutterby remained at the mill until his death in 1898. William Sutterby was the next miller. He installed a steam engine as auxiliary power. The mill was damaged by a gale on 22 February 1908 and did not work by wind thereafter. The mill was offered for sale by auction in April 1912. The cap was still in place in August 1935. The mill had been converted to residential use by 1978. The mill was listed Grade II on 28 July 1986.

== Description ==
Fen End Mill is a five storey tower mill. It had an ogee cap with a petticoat and gallery. The cap ran on a dead curb. Four sails were carried on a cast iron windshaft. The mill was winded by a fantail. Three pairs of millstones were driven.
