= North Creake Windmill =

Windmill in North Creake, Norfolk, England

- Interactive map of North Creake Windmill

Origin
- Mill name: North Creake Windmill
- Mill location: North Creake, Norfolk, United Kingdom
- Grid reference: TF 8530 3823
- Coordinates: 52°54′34″N 0°45′14″E
- Year built: c.1820

Information
- Purpose: Corn mill
- Type: Tower mill
- Storeys: Five storeys
- No. of sails: Four
- Type of sails: Patent sails
- Windshaft: Cast iron
- Winding: Fantail
- Fantail blades: Six
- No. of pairs of millstones: Two pairs

North Creake Windmill is a Grade II listed tower mill in North Creake, Norfolk, United Kingdom. It was built c.1820 and worked until c.1910. The tower survives, devoid of machinery.

== History ==
North Creake Windmill was built c.1820. It was described as "newly erected" when advertised for sale by auction in February 1820. James Cuthbert was the miller from 1836 until his death in 1852, followed by his son, James. The mill was offered for sale by auction in May 1856. John Smith was the miller from 1857 to 1881, when he was declared bankrupt. J. & H. Goshawk were the millers in 1884. George Tipple was the miller in 1888 and Henry Goshawk in 1890.

When the mill ceased working is not known, although it was working c.1910. The mill had lost its cap and sails by August 1936 and was then being used as a store. Arthur C. Smith surveyed the mill on 23 October 1970 and 16 May 1981. He described the mill as an empty shell retaining its floors. The mill was listed Grade II on 18 April 1985.

== Description ==
North Creake Windmill is a five storey tower mill. The tower is about 30 feet 0 inches (9.14 m) tall. Four patent sails were carried on a cast iron windshaft. The mill was winded by a six-bladed fantail. The mill drove two pairs of millstones.
