= Cooper's Mill, Walpole St Peter =

Windmill in Norfolk, England

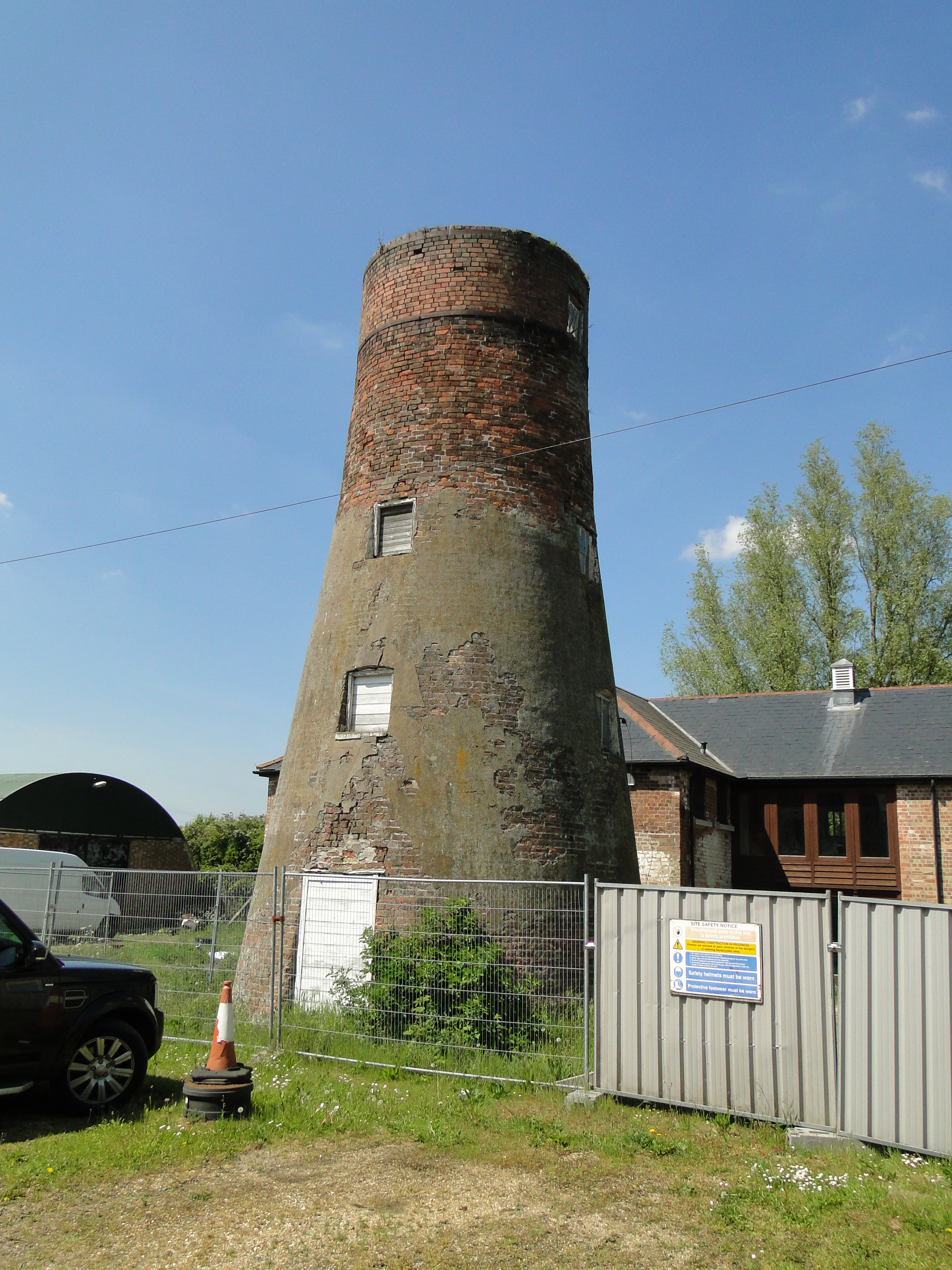
- Cooper's Mill, May 2019
- Interactive map of Cooper's Mill, Walpole St Peter

Origin
- Mill name: Cooper's Mill
- Mill location: Walpole St Peter, Norfolk, United Kingdom
- Grid reference: TF 5155 1426
- Coordinates: 52°42′17″N 0°14′29″E
- Year built: 1766

Information
- Purpose: Corn mill
- Type: Tower mill
- Storeys: Five storeys
- No. of sails: Four
- Type of sails: Patent sails
- Windshaft: Cast iron
- Winding: Fantail
- Fantail blades: Eight
- Auxiliary power: Steam engine, later an oil engine
- No. of pairs of millstones: Three pairs, plus four pairs driven by engine

Cooper's Mill is a Grade II listed tower mill in Walpole St Peter, Norfolk, United Kingdom. The mill was built in 1766. It worked by wind until 1947 then by engine. The mill was stripped in the 1960s. An empty tower survives.

== History ==
Cooper's Mill was built in 1766. In that year, Richard Richardson (or Richisson) was granted permission to erect a windmill at Bell Drove. The mill passed to John Towne in 1770 in lieu of debt, although Richisson worked it until his death in 1779. Joseph Cook was the miller in 1790. The mill was offered for sale in 1790. Cooper's Mill is one of two windmills that stood in Walpole St Peter, the other was a post mill at Waterdown Green. Neither mill was marked on Faden's 1797 map of Norfolk. Cook surrendered the mill to William Batch on 16 January 1807. Batch died in 1812 and his widow, Sarah ran the mill. Both windmills were marked on the 1824 Ordnance Survey map of Norfolk. The surviving tower mill has a beam that bears the date 1743, but this beam has been reused from an earlier mill. The mill was built as a three-storey mill. It stood in Norfolk when built, but was transferred to Cambridgeshire in 1837. John Batch, known as James, was the miller from 1836 to his death in 1856. The mill was then run by his widow, Rebecca. The mill was offered to let in 1861. It then had two pairs of millstones. William Clayton was the miller from 1864 to 1865, followed by John Wilson from 1866 to 1868, then William Bennington from 1871 to 1872. William Loweth was the miller from 1875 to 1878, then Alfred Robert Loweth in 1879. The mill was then acquired by the Cooper family. It was raised by two storeys in 1890, and a third pair of millstones was added. The mill was run by James Cooper & Son from 1883 to 1892, by which date a steam engine had been installed as auxiliary power. Herbert Cooper ran the mill from 1896 to 1947, in partnership with his son Reginald from 1922. The mill was damaged in a gale on 2 February 1908. Walpole St Peter was transferred back to Norfolk in 1938. The mill worked by wind until 1947, when the sails were removed.

The mill was listed Grade II on 11 August 1951. In 1956, Norfolk County Council considered that the mill was one of eighteen in Norfolk worth renovating. The fanstage was removed in 1960, and the cap in 1969. At some point, the tower was stripped of its machinery. Arthur C. Smith surveyed the mill on 23 August 1980. He described it as a derelict tower without cap. The empty tower survives.

== Description ==
Cooper's Mill is a five-storey tower mill. It had an ogee cap with petticoat and gallery. Four Patent sails were carried on a cast iron windshaft. One pair was double shuttered, with seven bays of three shutters. This pair was fitted in 1935. The other pair was single shuttered, with six bays of four shutters. The mill was winded by an eight-bladed fantail. It drove three pairs of millstones. One pair were Peak stones and one pair were French Burr stones. Latterly, an oil engine drove a further four pairs of millstones. The upright shaft was of wood and cast iron. The wallower was of wood and the great spur wheel was of cast iron.
