= Blakeney Windmill =

Grade II listed windmill in the United Kingdom

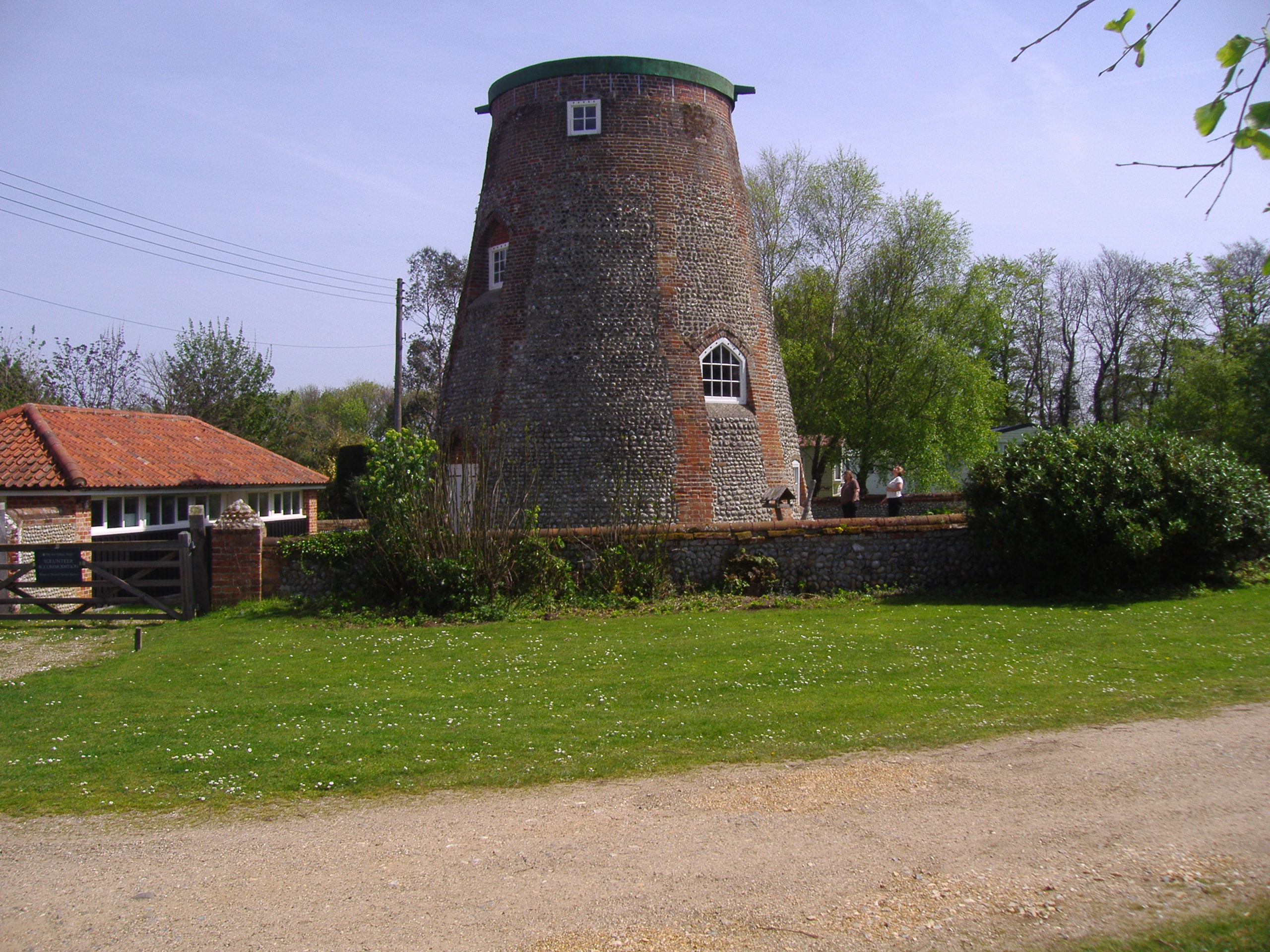
- Blakeney Tower Windmill
- Interactive map of Blakeney Windmill

Origin
- Mill location: Blakeney, North Norfolk, England
- Coordinates: 52°57′15.80″N 1°1′30.93″E
- Year built: 1769

Blakeney Tower Windmill, built in 1769, is located on Friar Farm just to the east of the village of Blakeney in the English county of Norfolk. The mill, which today is owned by the National Trust, stands in a static caravan site. The building has been evaluated due to its historic interest as a Grade II listed building.

== Description ==
The towermill stands over four storeys and is 32 feet tall. In its operational days the mill was powered with common sails and a tailpole. The configuration powered two pairs of grindstones. The doors and windows are unusual in that they have Gothic arches, probably installed during rebuilding work in the 1800s. Also during this period four patent double-shuttered sails were installed. These were struck by rack and pinion via a chain pole and drove three pairs of stones. Photographs from that period show that the windmill had one pair of sails had seven bays of three shutters and the other pair had eight bays of three shutters. The top of the mill was capped with a dome with a finial. This capping was boarded horizontally and it had a sixteen-sided petticoat. There was also a gallery and an eight-bladed fan.
