= Mill Farm Mill, Ingham =

Windmill in Norfolk, England

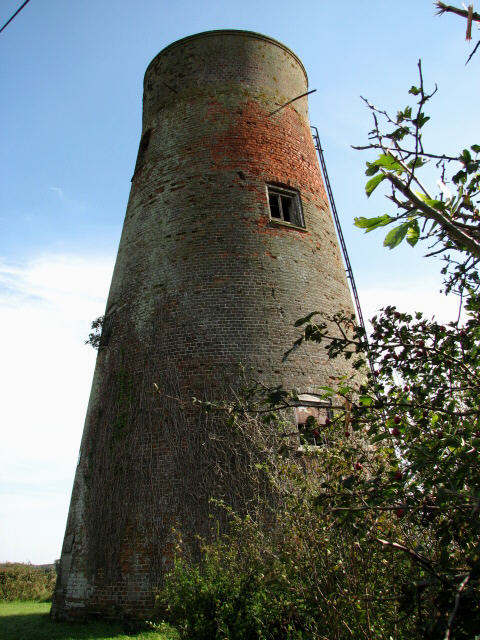
- Mill Farm Mill, September 2007
- Interactive map of Mill Farm Mill, Ingham

Origin
- Mill name: Mill Farm Mill
- Mill location: Ingham, Norfolk, United Kingdom
- Grid reference: TG 3916 2512
- Coordinates: 52°46′16″N 1°32′41″E
- Year built: c.1872

Information
- Purpose: Corn mill
- Type: Tower mill
- Storeys: Five storeys
- No. of sails: Four
- Type of sails: Patent sails
- Windshaft: Cast iron
- Winding: Fantail
- Fantail blades: Six
- No. of pairs of millstones: Three pairs

Mill Farm Mill is a tower mill in Ingham, Norfolk, United Kingdom. It was built in the 1872s and worked until the early 1930s. The mill was used as an observation post during World War II.

== History ==
A tower mill was built at Ingham c. 1763, replacing a post mill which had been blown down. John Matthews was the miller in 1828. George Matthews was the miller from 1836 to 1872. The mill was replaced by a new tower mill, which was described as "new built" in 1872. James Frosdick was the miller in 1875. He was followed by Henry Cook in 1878 and George Robert Gladden from 1883 to 1916. Norman J. Goffin was the miller from 1922 to 1933.

By 1939, the mill had lost one pair of sails and the fantail, with just the stocks of the sails remaining. The shutters had been removed from the other pair, except for the inner two bays. During the Second World War, the mill was used as an observer post by the Royal Observer Corps. The tower was extended upward by 7 feet (2.1 m) and a metal ladder was attached externally.

== Description ==
Mill Farm Mill is a five storey tower mill. The tower is 42 feet 0 inches (12.80 m) tall. It had a boat shaped cape with a petticoat and gallery. Four double Patent sails were carried on a cast iron windshaft. One pair had nine bays of three shutters. The other pair also had nine bays of three shutters, except the trailing bay of the innermost bay, which had four shutters. The mill was winded by a six-bladed fantail. The wooden upright shaft was square above the great spur wheel and 17 1/2 inches (440 mm) diameter below it. Three pairs of millstones were driven.
