= West Winch Windmill =

Windmill in West Winch, Norfolk, England

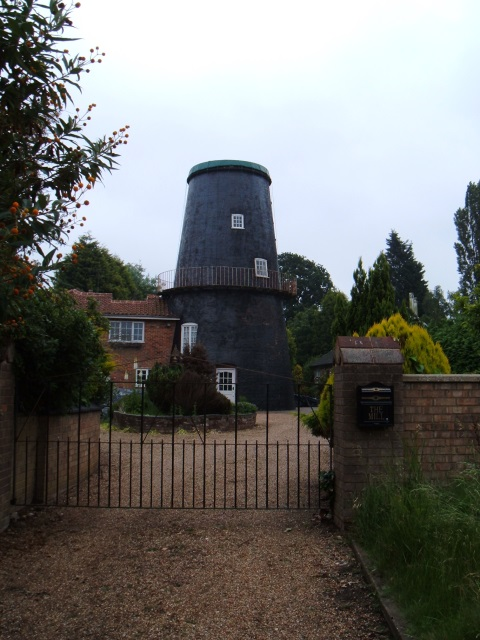
- West Winch Windmill
- Interactive map of West Winch Windmill

Origin
- Mill location: Village of West Winch
- Grid reference: TF632168
- Coordinates: 52.7241°N 0.4141°E
- Year built: 1812

West Winch Windmill is located in the village of West Winch in the English county of Norfolk. West Winch is two miles south of King's Lynn. The mill is a grade II listed building.

== Description ==
The present owner of the Windmill has turned it into a private residence The windmill was built in 1821 and is of a brick construction and the outside was tarred. The mill stands over 5 storeys with a gallery stage on the second floor. The cap was of constructed of ogee planking and had a 6 bladed fan. The mill once had two pairs of patent sails. Inside the sails powered three pairs of stones and other auxiliary machinery. The site also once had a granary, workshop and a bakery. At some stage there was also a steam engine which helped power a fourth set of stones.

== History ==
The windmill stopped production in 1936 and over the next 35 years became derelict. By the early years of the 1970s the cap was disintegrating and the sails and stock had gone. Some of the internal machinery was still remaining. In 1975 some restoration work was begun with the help of millwrights. In 1975 the old cap was removed with a new one replacing it in 1977 along with a working 6 blade fantail. It is unclear what happened to this new cap as today once more the mill cap is missing.

The cap is currently sitting at the bottom of the tower awaiting repair.
