= Fodderston Mill, Shouldham Thorpe =

Windmill in Shouldham Thorpe, Norfolk, England

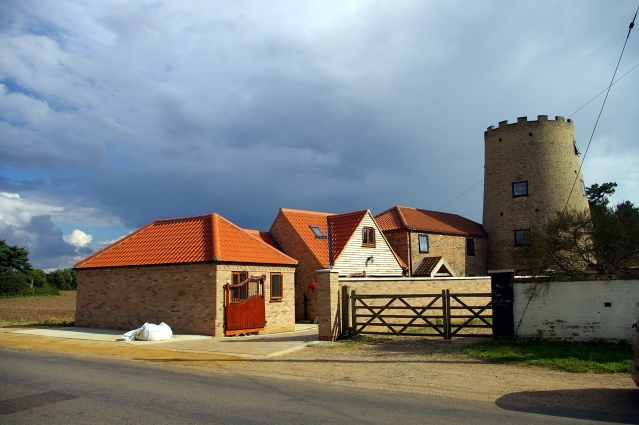
- Fodderston Mill, July 2007
- Interactive map of Fodderston Mill, Shouldham Thorpe

Origin
- Mill name: Fodderston Mill
- Mill location: Shouldham Thorpe, Norfolk, United Kingdom
- Grid reference: TF 6588 0883
- Coordinates: 52°39′08″N 0°27′04″E
- Year built: 1830

Information
- Purpose: Corn mill
- Type: Tower mill
- Storeys: Five
- No. of pairs of millstones: Three pairs

Fodderston Mill is a tower mill at Shouldham Thorpe, Norfolk, United Kingdom. It was built in 1830. It worked until about 1904, and was then used as a store. The tower survives, converted to residential use.

== History ==
Fodderston Mill was built in 1830 on the site of a post mill which was shown as a mill mound on the 1824 Ordnance Survey map and a windmill on Bryant's 1826 map of Norfolk. Robert Elmer was the miller in 1836. William Newton Butter was the miller from 1845 to 1846, then Matther Alflatt from 1853 to 1858. James Pollard was the miller from 1863 to 1887, then Robert Pollard until c1904.

The mill had been dismantled by 1933, with the tower capped by a conical roof. Arthur C. Smith surveyed the mill on 6 April 1970. He described it as a derelict brick tower, crumbling at the top. By August 1980, shrubs were growing out of the top of the tower and the roof was in ruins. Mill Farm was offered for sale in June 1982. The mill was described as being used as a store in the sale advert. By 2021, the mill had been converted to residential use.

== Description ==
Foddreston Mill is a five storey tower mill. The tower is about 50 feet (15 m) tall. Three pairs of millstones were driven.
