= Little Melton Windmill =

Windmill in Little Melton, Norfolk, England

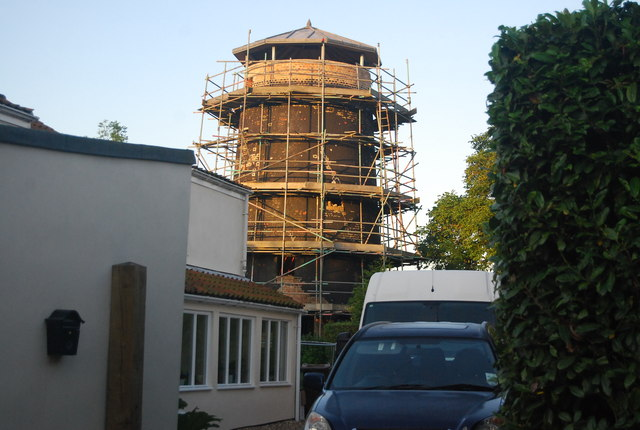
- Little Melton Windmill, June 2012
- Interactive map of Little Melton Windmill

Origin
- Mill location: Little Melton], Norfolk, United Kingdom
- Grid reference: TG 1580 0685
- Coordinates: 52.6166°N 1.1863°E

Information
- Purpose: Corn mill
- Type: Tower mill
- Storeys: Five storeys
- No. of sails: Four
- Type of sails: Patent sails
- Windshaft: Cast iron
- Winding: Fantail
- Fantail blades: Six
- Auxiliary power: Steam engine

Little Melton Windmill is a tower mill in Little Melton, Norfolk, United Kingdom. Built in the 1830s, it worked by wind until 1904. The tower survives, devoid of machinery.

== History ==
Little Melton Windmill was standing in 1836. The miller then was Thomas Burrows. John Yeoman was the miller 1845–46 and John Wright Lovett 1853–56, then Frederick Wright 1858–62. The mill was damaged in a storm in November 1861. Thomas Smithdale, the Norwich millwright repaired the mill. A new cap, fantail and curb were required, as well as three new sails and a new stock. A stock and sail were repairable. Samuel Barrett (1862–1904) was the last miller. A steam engine had been installed as auxiliary power by 1888. The mill was offered for sale by auction in December 1804. By 1937, the mill had lost its sails and fantail, but retained its cap. Arthur C. Smith surveyed the mill on 23 October 1970. By then, it was an empty tower. The mill was roofed and re-tarred in 2012.

== Description ==
Little Melton Windmill is a five storey tower mill. It had a boat shaped cap with a petticoat and gallery. A cast iron windshaft carried four double Patent sails. One pair had eight bays of three shutters, the other had eight bays of four shutters. The mill was winded by a six-bladed fantail.
