= Grade II* listed buildings in Breckland =

There are over 20,000 Grade II* listed buildings in England. This page is a list of 102 of these buildings in the district of Breckland in Norfolk.

== List of buildings ==
Name	Location	Type	Completed (Note: The date given is the date used by Historic England as significant for the initial building or that of an important part in the structure's description.)	Date designated	Grid ref. (Note: The grid reference is based on the British national grid reference system, sometimes known as OSGB36, used by the Ordnance Survey.) Geo-coordinates	Entry number (Note: The "List Entry Number" is a unique number assigned to each listed building and scheduled monument by Historic England.)	Image
Attleborough Hall	Attleborough	Country house	16th century	21 July 1951	TM0504896273; 52°31′33″N 1°01′16″E	1342452	Attleborough Hall
Bridge and walls to moat at Attleborough Hall	Attleborough	Bridge	Mid-16th century	1 October 1979	TM0510796286; 52°31′33″N 1°01′20″E	1169012	Upload Photo
Banham Hall	Banham	Manor house	Late 16th century	21 July 1951	TM0698389129; 52°27′39″N 1°02′43″E	1306687	Banham Hall More images
Kings Head Cottage	Banham	House	17th century	9 February 1984	TM0656287619; 52°26′51″N 1°02′17″E	1342453	Upload Photo
Church of St Peter	Bittering, Beeston with Bittering	Parish church	12th and 13th century	30 May 1960	TF9376817526; 52°43′14″N 0°52′03″E	1342520	Church of St Peter More images
Church of St Mary	East Bilney, Beetley	Church	14th century	30 May 1960	TF9553419536; 52°44′17″N 0°53′42″E	1342554	Church of St Mary More images
Church of St Swithin	Bintree	Parish church	14th century	30 May 1960	TG0171623446; 52°46′15″N 0°59′20″E	1077371	Church of St Swithin More images
Blo' Norton Hall	Blo' Norton	Country house	Mid-16th century	21 July 1951	TM0082679633; 52°22′40″N 0°56′57″E	1077439	Blo' Norton Hall More images
Church Farmhouse	Blo' Norton	Farmhouse	Late 15th century	21 July 1951	TM0121279795; 52°22′45″N 0°57′17″E	1077441	Church Farmhouse
Church of St Andrew	Blo' Norton	Parish church	13th century	16 July 1958	TM0122279698; 52°22′42″N 0°57′18″E	1077440	Church of St Andrew More images
Clock tower to north of Shadwell Court	Brettenham	Clock tower	1856–60	18 March 1983	TL9286883163; 52°24′45″N 0°50′04″E	1342781	Upload Photo
The College	Brettenham	House	19th century	21 July 1951	TL9238881217; 52°23′43″N 0°49′34″E	1076907	The College More images
Church of St Mary	Bridgham	Parish church	14th century	16 July 1958	TL9577385826; 52°26′07″N 0°52′43″E	1076909	Church of St Mary More images
Brisley Hall	Brisley	Farmhouse	17th century and earlier	4 December 1951	TF9527621374; 52°45′17″N 0°53′32″E	1342482	Upload Photo
Bylaugh Hall	Bylaugh Park, Bylaugh	Country house	1850–52	15 April 1982	TG0353618751; 52°43′41″N 1°00′46″E	1077349	Bylaugh Hall More images
Farm buildings at Park Farm	Bylaugh	Farm buildings	c.1850	15 May 1999	TG0301118424; 52°43′31″N 1°00′17″E	1379764	Upload Photo
Caston Windmill and Granary	Caston	Mill	1864	21 July 1951	TL9511198159; 52°32′47″N 0°52′34″E	1076787	Caston Windmill and Granary More images
Church of All Saints	Cockley Cley	Parish church	13th century and later	23 June 1960	TF7917804186; 52°36′21″N 0°38′41″E	1077261	Church of All Saints More images
Church of St Mary	Colkirk	Parish church	14th century and later	30 May 1960	TF9178526549; 52°48′09″N 0°50′37″E	1077464	Church of St Mary More images
Hall Farmhouse	Colkirk	Farmhouse	16th century	4 December 1951	TF9245426676; 52°48′12″N 0°51′13″E	1304756	Hall Farmhouse
Pattesley House	Pattesley, Colkirk	Farmhouse	14th century and later	4 December 1951	TF8984424107; 52°46′52″N 0°48′48″E	1077468	Upload Photo
Church of St Andrew	Southburgh, Cranworth	Parish church	14th century and later	30 May 1960	TG0032104832; 52°36′16″N 0°57′24″E	1172040	Church of St Andrew More images
Letton Hall	Cranworth	Country house	1783–89	4 December 1951	TF9717605872; 52°36′53″N 0°54′40″E	1077342	Letton Hall More images
Dereham Maltings (Crisp Malting Group)	Dereham	Industrial building	1870 and 1894	27 July 2000	TF9941913130; 52°40′45″N 0°56′55″E	1246348	Dereham Maltings (Crisp Malting Group)
West Hall	Didlington	House	17th century	18 February 1987	TL7977294025; 52°30′52″N 0°38′52″E	1171962	Upload Photo
Old Hall	East Tuddenham	Farmhouse	16th century	4 December 1951	TG0880711092; 52°39′26″N 1°05′09″E	1077351	Upload Photo
Church of St Thomas	Foxley	Parish church	14th century and later	30 May 1960	TG0395221714; 52°45′16″N 1°01′15″E	1169955	Church of St Thomas More images
Church of All Saints	Great Fransham, Fransham	Parish church	Late 13th century and later	30 May 1960	TF8989013104; 52°40′56″N 0°48′28″E	1077471	Church of All Saints More images
Hyde Hall	Great Fransham, Fransham	Farmhouse	Mid-18th century	14 June 1984	TF9163412919; 52°40′48″N 0°50′00″E	1077469	Upload Photo
The Old Hall	Little Fransham, Fransham	Farmhouse	16th century	4 December 1951	TF9028111866; 52°40′16″N 0°48′46″E	1152599	Upload Photo
Garboldisham Windmill	Garboldisham	Windmill	c.1780	16 July 1958	TM0027580472; 52°23′08″N 0°56′29″E	1168497	Garboldisham Windmill More images
Jacques	Garboldisham	Cross passage house	c.1490	21 July 1951	TM0035181964; 52°23′56″N 0°56′37″E	1077445	Upload Photo
Church of St Margaret	Garvestone	Parish church	14th century	30 May 1960	TG0238207362; 52°37′35″N 0°59′19″E	1305274	Church of St Margaret More images
Guntons Farmhouse	Garvestone	Farmhouse	18th century	4 December 1951	TG0162906868; 52°37′20″N 0°58′38″E	1342566	Upload Photo
Reymerston Old Hall Farmhouse	Reymerston, Garvestone	Farmhouse	1620	4 December 1951	TG0144206352; 52°37′03″N 0°58′27″E	1342565	Upload Photo
Church of St Andrew	Guist	Parish church	13th century and later	30 May 1960	TG0002025606; 52°47′27″N 0°57′54″E	1306255	Church of St Andrew More images
Church of St Mary	Bodney, Hilborough	Parish church	14th century and later	23 June 1960	TL8311898835; 52°33′24″N 0°41′59″E	1077285	Church of St Mary More images
Hilborough Hall	Hilborough	House	1779	9 July 1951	TF8276700304; 52°34′11″N 0°41′43″E	1077283	Hilborough Hall More images
Hilborough Mill	Hilborough	Mill house	1819	30 October 1985	TL8272699928; 52°33′59″N 0°41′41″E	1342591	Hilborough Mill More images
Church of St Andrew	Hoe	Parish church	13th century	30 May 1960	TF9975616421; 52°42′31″N 0°57′20″E	1077329	Church of St Andrew More images
Church of St Margaret	Worthing, Hoe and Worthing	Parish church	12th century and later	30 May 1960	TF9949619530; 52°44′12″N 0°57′13″E	1342577	Church of St Margaret More images
Church of St Edmund	Horningtoft	Parish church	13th century	14 June 1984	TF9361323080; 52°46′14″N 0°52′07″E	1304480	Church of St Edmund More images
Church of St Peter	Ickburgh	Parish church	14th century	23 June 1960	TL8164495067; 52°31′24″N 0°40′34″E	1077286	Church of St Peter More images
Kenninghall Place	Kenninghall	House	1505–25	21 July 1951	TM0691785620; 52°25′46″N 1°02′32″E	1077419	Upload Photo
Church of St Andrew	Kilverstone	Parish church	12th century	16 July 1958	TL8938684014; 52°25′17″N 0°47′01″E	1342788	Church of St Andrew More images
Church of St Nicholas	West Lexham, Lexham	Parish church	14th century, restored 1891	30 May 1960	TF8425617211; 52°43′16″N 0°43′36″E	1077485	Church of St Nicholas More images
Pumphouse	Little Cressingham	Pump house	Early 19th century	3 April 1987	TF8696700215; 52°34′03″N 0°45′26″E	1077226	Pumphouse
Wind and Water Mill	Little Cressingham	Watermill	c.1820	9 July 1951	TF8697900213; 52°34′03″N 0°45′27″E	1152133	Wind and Water Mill More images
Dunham Lodge	Little Dunham	Country house	1783	4 December 1951	TF8772912849; 52°40′51″N 0°46′32″E	1077493	Dunham Lodge More images
Church of St Peter	Little Ellingham	Parish church	Early 14th century	16 November 1983	TM0050899155; 52°33′12″N 0°57′22″E	1342423	Church of St Peter More images
Church of St Andrew and St Peter	Longham	Parish church	15th century and later	30 May 1960	TF9318716189; 52°42′32″N 0°51′30″E	1077331	Church of St Andrew and St Peter More images
Church of Our Lady of Consolation	Lynford	Roman Catholic church	1879	18 February 1987	TL8188293306; 52°30′26″N 0°40′43″E	1077247	Church of Our Lady of Consolation More images
Church of St Margaret	Lyng	Parish church	13th century and later	30 May 1960	TG0690617855; 52°43′08″N 1°03′43″E	1169125	Church of St Margaret More images
Ivy Farmhouse	Mattishall	House	First half of 18th century	4 December 1951	TG0437610901; 52°39′26″N 1°01′13″E	1077328	Upload Photo
Merton Hall Gatehouse	Merton	Gatehouse	1620	21 July 1951	TL9111697765; 52°32′39″N 0°49′01″E	1076830	Merton Hall Gatehouse
Cross in the churchyard 10 metres west of tower of Church of St John the Baptist	Mileham	Cross	15th century	14 June 1984	TF9217619584; 52°44′23″N 0°50′43″E	1342489	Upload Photo
Church of St Leonard	Mundford	Parish church	14th century	23 June 1960	TL8005293801; 52°30′44″N 0°39′07″E	1342617	Church of St Leonard More images
Narborough Hall	Narborough	Country house	Late 16th century	9 July 1951	TF7493713142; 52°41′16″N 0°35′12″E	1077305	Narborough Hall More images
Table tomb approximately 14 metres south of aisle of All Saints' Church	Necton	Chest tomb	14th century	3 April 1987	TF8785809729; 52°39′10″N 0°46′33″E	1077228	Table tomb approximately 14 metres south of aisle of All Saints' Church More images
Market House	New Buckenham	Toll house	1559	9 February 1984	TM0885390443; 52°28′19″N 1°04′25″E	1306640	Market House More images
Shettles	North Elmham	Farmhouse	15th century	4 December 1951	TF9849621067; 52°45′03″N 0°56′23″E	1170168	Upload Photo
Church of St Andrew	North Pickenham	Parish church	Pre-1863	23 June 1960	TF8655406920; 52°37′41″N 0°45′18″E	1077229	Church of St Andrew More images
Abbey Farmhouse	Old Buckenham	Farmhouse	c.1550–60	16 July 1958	TM0710492556; 52°29′30″N 1°02′57″E	1169388	Abbey Farmhouse More images
Old Buckenham Windmill	Old Buckenham	Windmill	1818	21 July 1951	TM0623590987; 52°28′40″N 1°02′07″E	1342467	Old Buckenham Windmill More images
Church of St. John Evangelist	Ovington	Parish church	12th century	16 July 1958	TF9254402594; 52°35′13″N 0°50′27″E	1076798	Church of St. John Evangelist More images
Church of the Immaculate Conception of the Blessed Virgin Mary and St Margaret, Oxburgh Hall	Oxburgh Hall Park, Oxborough	Roman Catholic chapel	1838	23 June 1960	TF7414701269; 52°34′53″N 0°34′08″E	1342587	Church of the Immaculate Conception of the Blessed Virgin Mary and St Margaret, Oxburgh Hall More images
Park boundary wall including tower and gateway, Oxburgh Hall	Oxburgh Hall Park, Oxborough	Tower	15th century	23 October 1985	TF7398601224; 52°34′52″N 0°33′59″E	1306374	Park boundary wall including tower and gateway, Oxburgh Hall
Church of All Saints, including tower	Hargham, Quidenham	Church	14th century	16 July 1958	TM0199291350; 52°28′58″N 0°58′24″E	1077512	Church of All Saints, including tower More images
Church of St Andrew	Quidenham	Parish church	Late 11th century	16 July 1958	TM0284087675; 52°26′58″N 0°59′01″E	1169567	Church of St Andrew More images
Church of St Mary	Eccles, Quidenham	Parish church	12th century	16 July 1958	TM0191389356; 52°27′53″N 0°58′15″E	1077510	Church of St Mary More images
Wilby Hall	Wilby, Quidenham	Country house	Late 16th century	9 February 1984	TM0327390555; 52°28′30″N 0°59′30″E	1077519	Wilby Hall More images
Church of St Peter	Riddlesworth	Parish church	Early 14th century	16 July 1958	TL9666681284; 52°23′39″N 0°53′20″E	1077393	Church of St Peter More images
Dovecote to Rougham Hall	Rougham	Dovecote	c.1690	4 December 1951	TF8298320606; 52°45′07″N 0°42′35″E	1342500	Upload Photo
Church of St Botolph	Stow Bedon	Parish church	12th century	21 July 1958	TL9614695574; 52°31′22″N 0°53′23″E	1077585	Church of St Botolph More images
Manor House including attached service range to east	Swaffham	House	c.1740	17 January 1973	TF8241909030; 52°38′54″N 0°41′42″E	1269575	Upload Photo
Oakleigh House	Swaffham	House	Early 17th century	10 January 1951	TF8182608997; 52°38′54″N 0°41′11″E	1269627	Oakleigh House More images
Bell Hotel	Thetford	Jettied house	Mid-15th century	3 April 1951	TL8692483124; 52°24′51″N 0°44′49″E	1195935	Bell Hotel More images
Church of St Cuthbert	Thetford	Parish church	Early 13th century	3 April 1951	TL8712083067; 52°24′49″N 0°45′00″E	1207726	Church of St Cuthbert More images
Church of St Mary the Less	Thetford	Parish church	11th century	3 April 1951	TL8678982822; 52°24′41″N 0°44′42″E	1297899	Church of St Mary the Less More images
Church of St Peter	Thetford	Parish church	14th century	3 April 1951	TL8692783176; 52°24′53″N 0°44′50″E	1219326	Church of St Peter More images
Fulmerston's Almshouses	Thetford	Almshouse	1610	3 April 1951	TL8682282858; 52°24′43″N 0°44′43″E	1279468	Upload Photo
Nunnery Place ruin approximately 10 metres south-east of the Nunnery	Nunnery Place, Thetford	Benedictine nunnery	c.1160–1540	3 April 1951	TL8731682222; 52°24′21″N 0°45′08″E	1195915	Nunnery Place ruin approximately 10 metres south-east of the Nunnery
Roman Catholic Church of St Mary	Thetford	Roman Catholic church	1826	3 April 1951	TL8666182844; 52°24′42″N 0°44′35″E	1207963	Upload Photo
The Nunnery	Nunnery Place, Thetford	House	Early 17th century	3 April 1951	TL8730282260; 52°24′23″N 0°45′08″E	1208030	The Nunnery
Thetford Warren Lodge	Thetford	Gamekeeper's lodge	Early 15th century	10 March 1971	TL8392984066; 52°25′25″N 0°42′13″E	1297876	Thetford Warren Lodge More images
3 and 5 Castle Street	Thetford	House	Late 15th century	3 April 1951	TL8722483061; 52°24′49″N 0°45′05″E	1207558	Upload Photo
3 and 4 Market Place	Thetford	Apartment	16th century	3 April 1951	TL8718883087; 52°24′49″N 0°45′03″E	1207841	Upload Photo
College Farmhouse	Thompson	House	1350	21 July 1951	TL9323296594; 52°31′59″N 0°50′51″E	1076807	College Farmhouse More images
Church of St Andrew	Tottington	Parish church	14th century	16 July 1958	TL8939795521; 52°31′29″N 0°47′25″E	1342814	Church of St Andrew More images
Church of St Nicholas	Twyford	Parish church	14th century	30 May 1960	TG0167724610; 52°46′53″N 0°59′20″E	1170307	Church of St Nicholas More images
Church of St. Mary	Watton	Parish church	12th century	16 July 1958	TF9213500943; 52°34′20″N 0°50′02″E	1153046	Church of St. Mary More images
Church of All Saints	Weasenham All Saints	Parish church	14th century, restored 1905–06	30 May 1960	TF8508021612; 52°45′37″N 0°44′29″E	1306499	Church of All Saints More images
Church of St Peter	Weasenham St. Peter	Parish church	13th century	30 May 1960	TF8561822355; 52°46′01″N 0°44′59″E	1169531	Church of St Peter More images
Church of St Mary	Weeting-with-Broomhill	Parish church	14th century	23 June 1960	TL7766989192; 52°28′18″N 0°36′52″E	1172178	Church of St Mary More images
Church of St Andrew	Wellingham	Parish church	Late 13th century and later	30 May 1960	TF8709822257; 52°45′56″N 0°46′18″E	1077456	Church of St Andrew More images
Church of St Peter and Paul	Wendling	Parish church	14th century, Norman fragments	30 May 1960	TF9313413134; 52°40′53″N 0°51′20″E	1077339	Church of St Peter and Paul More images
Church of St Andrew	Westfield, Whinburgh and Westfield	Parish church	14th century	30 May 1960	TF9929709919; 52°39′01″N 0°56′41″E	1077294	Church of St Andrew More images
Old Hall	Whinburgh and Westfield	Farmhouse	c.1600	4 December 1951	TG0150807909; 52°37′53″N 0°58′34″E	1152045	Upload Photo
Church of St Mary	Whissonsett	Parish church	Early 14th century and later	30 May 1960	TF9191923345; 52°46′25″N 0°50′37″E	1077436	Church of St Mary More images
Church of St Andrew	Illington, Wretham	Parish church	Early 15th century	16 July 1958	TL9481189994; 52°28′23″N 0°52′01″E	1170666	Church of St Andrew More images
Church of St Ethelbert	Wretham	Parish church	12th century	16 July 1958	TL9150590632; 52°28′48″N 0°49′07″E	1170650	Church of St Ethelbert More images
Holland's Hall	Bakerfield Green, Yaxham	Farmhouse	Late 16th century	4 December 1951	TG0289109506; 52°38′43″N 0°59′51″E	1152070	Upload Photo

== See also ==
- Grade II* listed buildings in Norfolk
  - Grade II* listed buildings in Broadland
  - Grade II* listed buildings in Great Yarmouth
  - Grade II* listed buildings in King's Lynn and West Norfolk
  - Grade II* listed buildings in North Norfolk
  - Grade II* listed buildings in Norwich
  - Grade II* listed buildings in South Norfolk
- Grade I listed buildings in Breckland
