= River Thet =

River in Norfolk, England

Thet
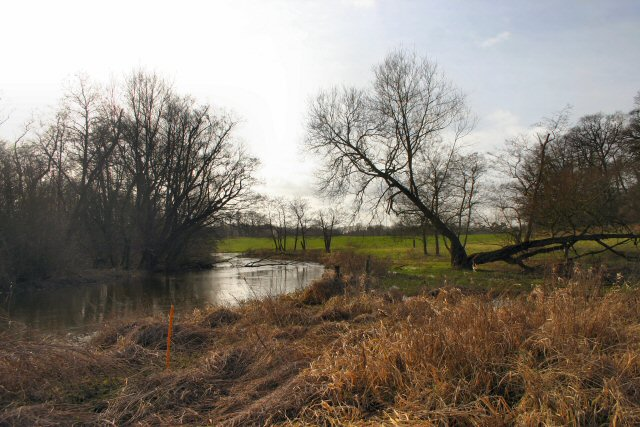
- River Thet at Brettenham

- Location of the river mouth within Norfolk
- Etymology: From Thetford, in turn from 'Theodford' which is Anglo-Saxon for 'Peoples Ford'

Location
- Country: England
- Region: Norfolk

Physical characteristics
- Source
  - location: Deopham Green
  - coordinates: 52.5507°N 1.0019°E
  - elevation: 53 m (174 ft)
- Mouth: River Little Ouse
  - location: Thetford
  - coordinates: 52.4113°N 0.7485°E
  - elevation: 10 m (33 ft)
- Length: 34.3 km (21.3 mi)
- Basin size: ≈225km^{2}

Basin features
- River system: River Little Ouse
- Tributaries
  - left: Wittle Stream from Middle Harling Fen Stream from Old Buckenham Fen
  - right: Stream from Roudham village Stream from Hockham

The River Thet is a river in Norfolk, England and is a tributary of the River Little Ouse. It rises in the Breckland with sources in Deopham Green and Rockland All Saints and joins the Little Ouse in Thetford after flowing approximately southwest.

The primary sources for its various small tributaries include the calcareous valley fen SSSIs Swangey Fen, Old Buckenham Fen, Middle Harling Fen and Kenninghall and Banham Fens with Quidenham Mere. Carr woodland is also a prevalent habitat throughout the floodplain where open wetlands have been invaded by scrub. The underlying geology is clay/loam over chalk for the easternmost parts of the river's course and sand/gravel over chalk for the majority of the river.

== Etymology, course and notable settlements nearby ==
The name actually comes from Thetford rather than the other way around as Thetford was such an important settlement during the Anglo Saxon period from which the name is derived. The other most notable settlement along the Thet is East Harling where the river has been forded for many centuries. Now a brick and concrete bridge carries the B1111 road over the river. Beneath the bridge is a weir and a widened section of river with a gravel bed (elsewhere the riverbed is predominantly mud). Downstream the river passes over another weir at Bridgham where another bridge crosses it and then through the Shadwell Estate. Here it splits into two channels, reconverges and passes a large artificial lake. When the river reaches Thetford it curves south then west again, meeting the Little Ouse just west of Butten Island in the centre of the town.

In the upper reaches of the Thet, there are a series of lakes including flooded gravel pits. These are situated at Snetterton in a linear pattern along the floodplain and also near Attleborough. All of these lakes are on private land and used for fishing.
