= Thet =

Thet may refer to:

- Thet people, a Burmese people from Myanmar
- Eth, a letter (Ð, ð)
- River Thet, a river in Norfolk, England
