= Old Buckenham =

Village in Norfolk, England

Coordinates: 52.48°N 1.04°E

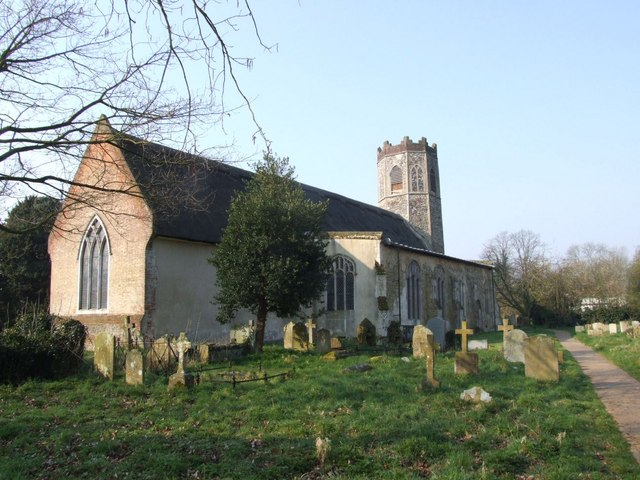
- All Saints Church, Old Buckenham

- Location within Norfolk
- Area: 20.06 km^{2} (7.75 sq mi)
- Population: 1,270 (2011 census)
  - Density: 63/km^{2} (160/sq mi)
- OS grid reference: TM0691
- Civil parish: Old Buckenham
- District: Breckland
- Shire county: Norfolk
- Region: East
- Country: England
- Sovereign state: United Kingdom
- Post town: ATTLEBOROUGH
- Postcode district: NR17
- Dialling code: 01953
- Police: Norfolk
- Fire: Norfolk
- Ambulance: East of England
- UK Parliament: Mid Norfolk

Old Buckenham is a village and civil parish in the English county of Norfolk, approximately 29 km (18 mi) south-west of Norwich.

It covers an area of 20.06 km^{2} (7.75 sq mi) and had a population of 1,294 in 658 households at the 2001 census falling to a population of 1,270 living in 529 households at the census 2011. For the purposes of local government, it falls within the district of Breckland.

== History ==
=== Toponymy ===
Old Buckenham was listed as Bucham, Buccham or Bucheham in the 1068 Domesday Book. The name comes from the Old English for "homestead of a man called Bucca".

=== Nineteenth century ===
During the nineteenth century there was a small Sandemanian community in the village which the natural philosopher Michael Faraday visited many times in the 1850s and 1860s.

== Governance ==
Since 2015, Old Buckenham is in The Buckenhams & Banham ward of Breckland district, which returns one councillor to the district council. Since 2010, the parish is part of the Parliamentary constituency of Mid Norfolk.

Historically the parish was part of the hundred of Shropham.

== Geography ==
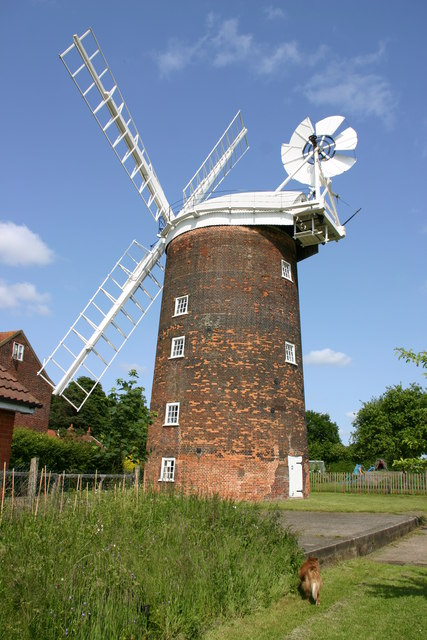
Old Buckenham windmill

Old Buckenham is in the southern part of the county of Norfolk, approximately 29 km (18 mi) south-west of Norwich and about 5 km (3.1 mi) south of its post town, Attleborough. Nearby villages include New Buckenham, Wilby and Banham.

There is a large village green at the heart of the village, called Church Green. The two public houses — the Gamekeeper and the Ox and Plough — are located by this green. The village as of 2018 has a Londis shop which is also the post office.

Old Buckenham Airfield lies to the north-east of the village. It was the home of the 453rd Bomb Group in the 2nd World war which flew the B24 liberator bombers. For a short time the actors James Stewart and Walter Matthau were based there. James Stewart attended the opening of the memorial room at the village all on 10 May 1983. The remains of Old Buckenham Castle and Old Buckenham Priory are nearby.

Old Buckenham Windmill is a preserved towermill built in 1818, originally having 8 common sails but now having four patent sails. It is well known in the mill world for having the largest windmill circumference in Britain and housed five pairs of stones. The granary next door had four pairs driven by a steam (later oil) engine. The mill is open several times a year.

Old Buckenham Cricket Club has one of the best grounds in Norfolk situated in what were the grounds of the old hall. The ground is famous for hosting a cricket match between L. G. Robinson's England XI (which included Jack Hobbs) and the touring Australians in 1921.

== Education ==
Old Buckenham has a high school (Old Buckenham High School), and a primary school. Old Buckenham Hall School was located in the village between 1937 and 1952. It is now located in Brettenham, Suffolk under the same name.

== Notable people ==
- Ellen Bird – born in Old Buckenham, personal maid of Ida Straus during the sinking of the Titanic. Bird survived.

== See also ==
- Old Buckenham Hall Cricket Ground
- Old Buckenham Fen
