= Deopham =

Village in Norfolk, England

Coordinates: 52.566°N 1.025°E

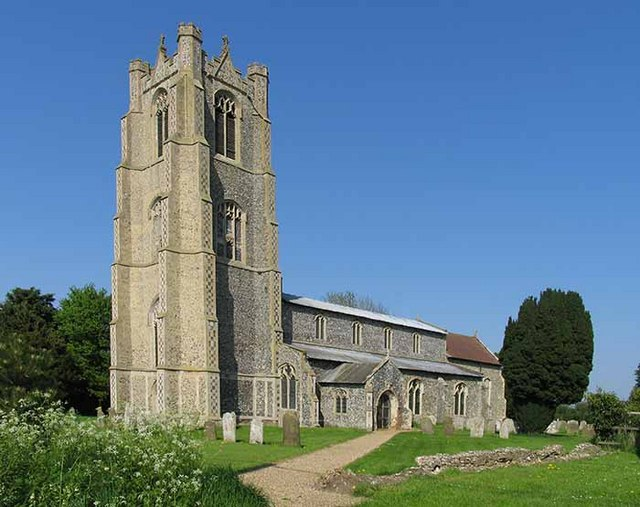
- St. Andrew's Church

- Location within Norfolk
- Area: 9.79 km^{2} (3.78 sq mi)
- Population: 542 (2021 census)
  - Density: 55/km^{2} (140/sq mi)
- OS grid reference: TG051008
- Civil parish: Deopham
- District: South Norfolk
- Shire county: Norfolk
- Region: East
- Country: England
- Sovereign state: United Kingdom
- Post town: WYMONDHAM
- Postcode district: NR18
- Dialling code: 01953
- UK Parliament: Mid Norfolk
- Website: Parish Council

Deopham is a village and civil parish in the South Norfolk district of Norfolk, England. The village lies 3.9 miles (6.3 km) west of Wymondham and 12 miles (19 km) south-west of Norwich. The parish, which includes Hackford village, Deopham Green hamlet and part of Deopham Stalland hamlet, had a population of 542 at the 2021 census.

== History ==
Deopham's name is of Anglo-Saxon origin and derives from the Old English for a homestead close to a deep body of water, likely the nearby Sea Mere.

In the Domesday Book, Deopham is listed as a settlement of 75 households in the hundred of Forehoe. In 1086, the village was divided between the estates of William de Warenne and Ralph de Beaufour.

In 1830, a windmill was built in Deopham which burnt down in the 1920s.

RAF Deopham Green opened in 1943 for use by the United States Army Air Forces during the Second World War. The base was at first home to rear echelon units, until it was handed over to the 452nd Operations Group of the Eighth Air Force flying B-17 Flying Fortresses against strategic targets in Continental Europe. In October 1945, the site reverted to the Royal Air Force which closed the airfield in 1948 and allowed it to revert to agricultural use.

=== Hackford ===
Hakeford was recorded as a small settlement of six households in the 1086 Domesday Book. The small village of Hakeford lies about 1.5 miles (2.4 km) north-east of Deopham, and the surrounding area was a separate civil parish until 1935, when it was merged into Deopham.

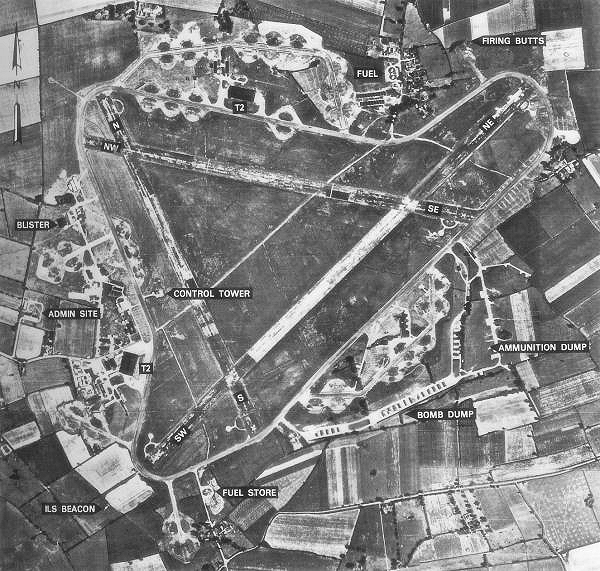
RAF Deopham Green, 1946

== Religious sites ==
Deopham's parish church is dedicated to Saint Andrew and dates at its earliest from the late-14th century. The building has been Grade I listed since 1959. St. Andrew's has suffered from vandalism and theft over the last few decades but retains pews from the 17th century.

St Mary's church at Hackford was begun in the 12th century but is described as "heavily restored" by Historic England; it has been Grade II* listed since 1959. The church, along with its income, was appropriated to Marham Abbey in 1276. The benefice was united with Deopham in 1921.

== Notable residents ==
- Dr. Messenger Monsey (1694–1788), humourist and physician to the Royal Hospital Chelsea

== Governance ==
Deopham is part of the electoral ward of Hingham & Deopham for local elections and is part of the district of South Norfolk.

The village's national constituency is Mid Norfolk which has been represented by the Conservative Party's George Freeman since 2010.

== War Memorial ==
Deopham's war memorial is two marble plaques topped with a crown and cross inside St. Andrew's Church. The memorial lists the following casualties of the First World War:

Rank	Name	Unit	Date of death	Burial/Commemoration
Pte.	Harry Kerry	1st Bn., Essex Regiment	13 Aug. 1915	Helles Memorial
Pte.	Arthur J. Morter	1st Bn., Norfolk Regiment	15 Jun. 1915	Sanctuary Wood Cemetery
Pte.	Percy R. Hurrell	1/4th Bn., Norfolk Regt.	19 Apr. 1917	Jerusalem Memorial
Pte.	Alfred W. Barrett	1st Bn., Northumberland Fusiliers	16 Sep. 1914	La Ferté Memorial

And, the following for the Second World War:

Rank	Name	Unit	Date of death	Burial/Commemoration
Pte.	Charles H. Bowen	4th Bn., Royal Norfolk Regiment	11 Feb. 1942	Kranji War Memorial
Pte.	Wilfred C. Everett	4th Bn., Royal Norfolks.	3 Jan. 1944	Chungkai War Cemetery
