= Messenger Monsey =

English physician and humorist (1694–1788)

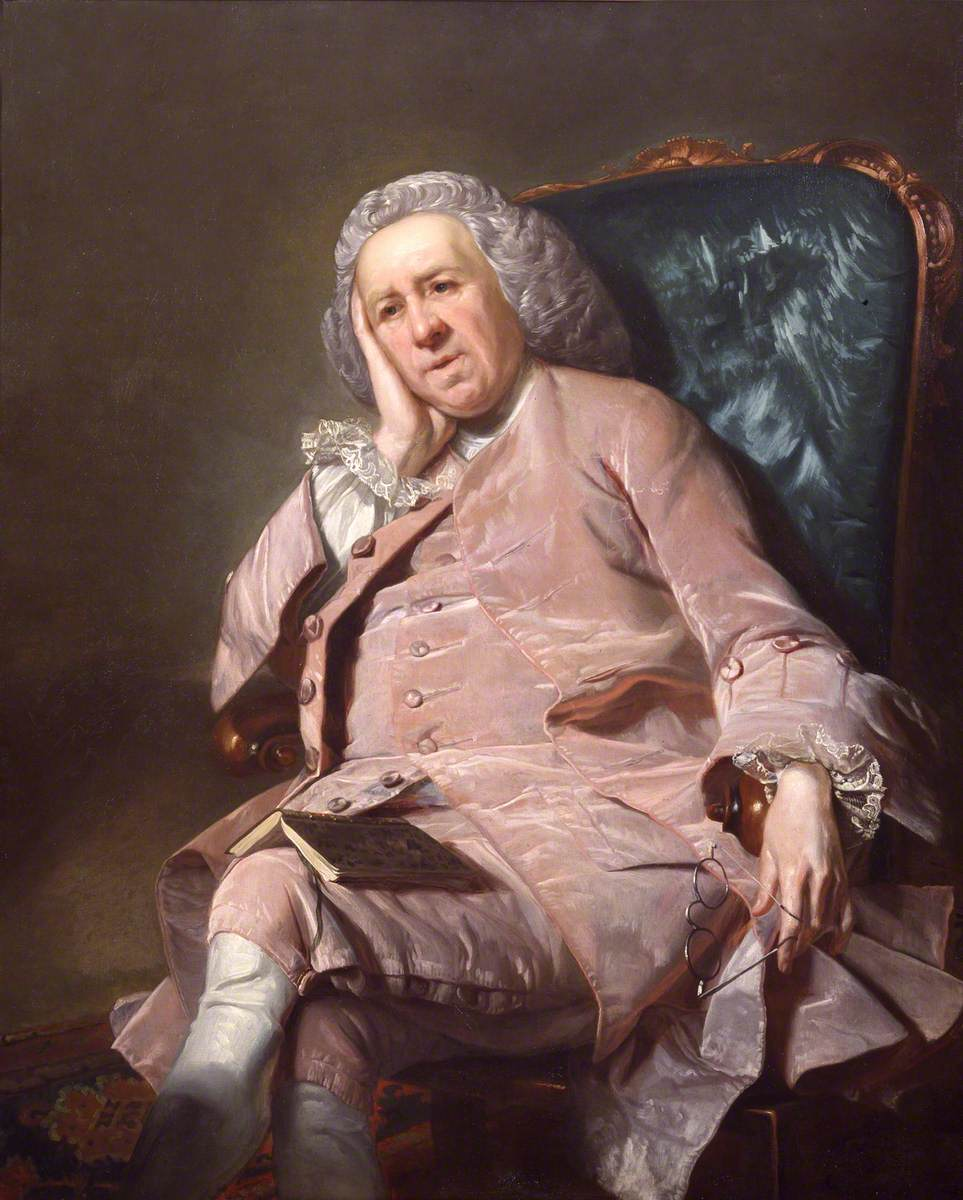
A portrait of Monsey by Mary Black

Messenger Monsey (October 1694 – 26 December 1788) was an English physician and humorist. He became physician to the Royal Hospital, Chelsea, a home for injured and elderly soldiers. Known for his eccentricity and ill manners, he is described in the diaries of Fanny Burney as "Dr. Monso, a strange gross man".

== Early life ==
Monsey, son of Robert Monsey, a non-juror cleric, and Mary (daughter of Roger Clopton, rector of Downham), was born at Hackford with Whitwell, Norfolk, and educated at home, then at Woodbridge School and Pembroke College, Cambridge (BA, 1714), before studying medicine under Sir Benjamin Wrench MD of Norwich (died 1747). Monsey was admitted to the Royal College of Physicians in 1723. He then practised in Bury St Edmunds, Suffolk, where he never earned more than £300 a year, but married well.

== Move to London ==
Monsey was lucky enough to be called to treat Francis Godolphin, 2nd Earl of Godolphin, who was taken ill with apoplexy on the way to Newmarket. Godolphin – taken with Monsey's skill, raucous sense of humour and insolent familiarity – persuaded him to move to London, where he introduced him to patients such as the Prime Minister, Sir Robert Walpole, Lord Chesterfield and other prominent Whigs. Monsey also built up literary connections. For many years he paid court to the bluestocking Elizabeth Montagu, writing rhymed letters to her in the style of Swift. His friendship with David Garrick was broken after a quarrel. Dr Johnson disapproved of his coarse wit.

According to William Munk, "Monsey maintained his original plainness of manners, and with an unreserved sincerity sometimes spoke truth in a manner that gave offence; and as old age approached, he acquired an asperity of behaviour and a neglect of decorum.... As a physician he adhered to the tenets of the Boerhaavian school, and despised modern improvements in theory and practice." Monsey was a free-thinker in religious matters, or as Munk put it, "he shook off the manacles of superstition [and] he fell into the comfortless bigotry of scepticism." One man whom Monsey admired was the Dutch-born physician, philosopher and satirist Bernard Mandeville. Monsey's copy of Mandeville's The Fable of the Bees survives in the library of Sir John Soane's Museum, London, to which he presented it in 1781.

== Legacy ==
Anecdotes about Monsey's eccentricities and unseemly language were collected after his death. He held his appointment to Chelsea Hospital, also obtained through Godolphin, until his death there on 26 December 1788 aged 94, after which he was dissected in a post mortem examination before students of Guy's Hospital, as he had requested. An extensive medical and personal correspondence between Monsey and the noted Norwich physician and philanthropist Benjamin Gooch survives in the British Library. On his death Monsey left £16,000 to his only daughter Charlotte, who had married William Alexander, brother to James Alexander, 1st Earl of Caledon.
