= Wilby Hall, Norfolk =

Country house in Norfolk, England

Coordinates: 52°28′30″N 0°59′30″E

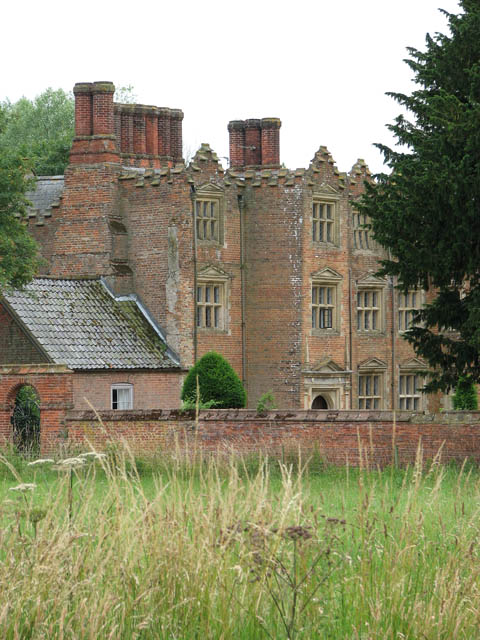
Wilby Hall

Wilby Hall is a country house north of the village of Wilby, in the civil parish of Quidenham, in Norfolk, England. It is recorded in the National Heritage List for England as a designated Grade II* listed building on 9 February 1984. The house dates to the late-16th century.
