= Mere (lake) =

Lake, pond, or wetland

In Great Britain, a mere is a lake, pond, or wetland, often shallow.

== Derivation of the word ==
=== Etymology ===
The word mere is recorded in Old English as mere ″sea, lake″, corresponding to

- Old Saxon meri,
- Old Low Franconian *meri (Dutch meer ″lake, pool″, Picard mer ″pool, lake″, Northern French toponymic element -mer),
- Old High German mari / meri (German Meer ″sea″, but also Maar ″circular lake″),
- Goth. mari-, marei,
- Old Norse marr ″sea″ (Norwegian mar ″sea″, Shetland Norn mar ″mer, deep water fishing area″, Faroese marrur ″mud, sludge″, Swedish place name element mar-, French mare ″pool, pond″).

They derive from reconstituted Proto-Germanic *mari, itself from Indo-European *mori, the same root as marsh and moor. The Indo-European root *mori gave also birth to similar words in other European languages: Latin mare, ″sea″ (Italian mare, Spanish mar, French mer); Old Celtic *mori, ″sea″ (Gaulish mori-, more, Irish muir, Welsh môr, Breton mor); and Old Slavic morje.

=== Signification ===
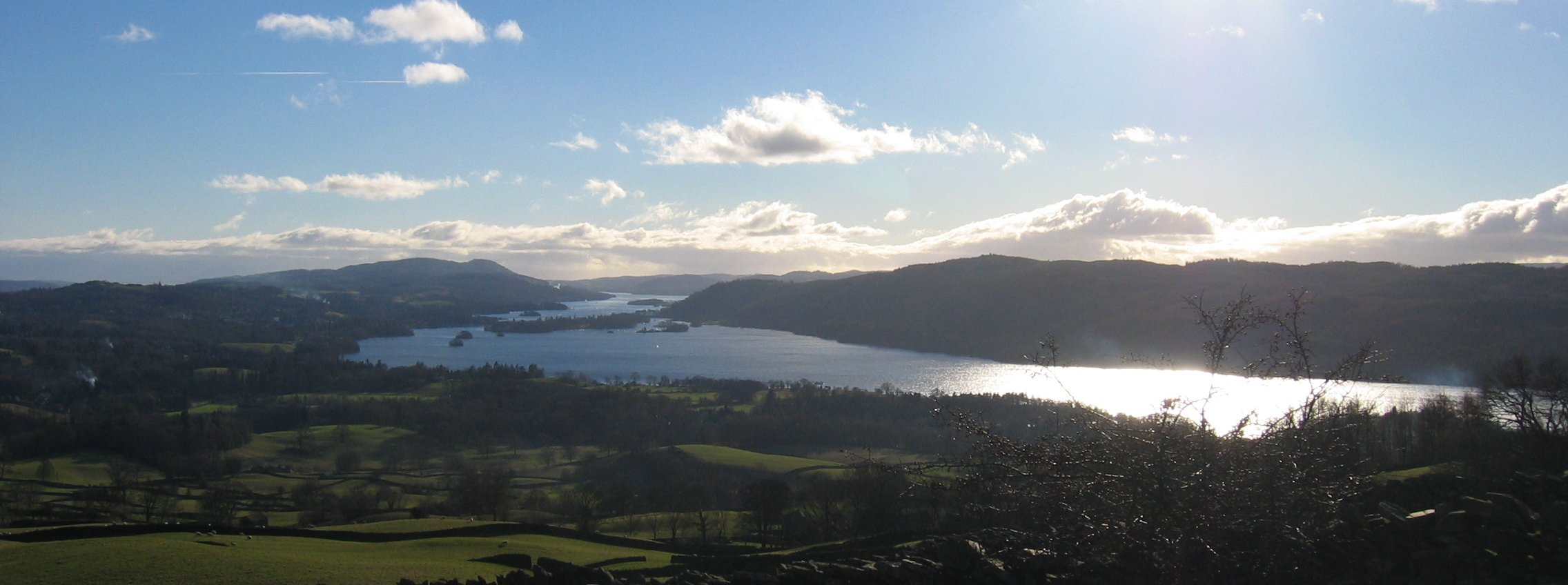
Windermere, viewed from the north

The word once included the sea or an arm of the sea in its range of meaning, but this marine usage is now obsolete (OED). It is a poetical or dialect word meaning a sheet of standing water, a lake or a pond (OED). The OED's fourth definition ("A marsh, a fen.") includes wetland such as fen amongst usages of the word which is reflected in the lexicographers' recording of it. In a quotation from the year 598, mere is contrasted against moss (bog) and field against fen. The OED quotation from 1609 does not say what a mere is, except that it looks black. In 1629 mere and marsh were becoming interchangeable but in 1876 mere was "heard, at times, applied to ground permanently under water": in other words, a very shallow lake. The online edition of the OED's quoted examples relate to:

1. the sea: Old English to 1530: 7 quotations
2. standing water: Old English to 1998: 22 quotations
3. arm of the sea: 1573 to 1676: 4 quotations
4. marsh or fen: 1609 to 1995: 7 quotations

== Characteristics ==
Where land similar to that of Martin Mere, gently undulating glacial till, becomes flooded and develops fen and bog, the remnants of the original mere remain until the whole is filled with peat. This can be delayed where the mere is fed by lime-rich water from chalk or limestone upland and a significant proportion of the outflow from the mere takes the form of evaporation. In these circumstances, the lime (typically calcium carbonate) is deposited on the peaty bed and inhibits plant growth, therefore, peat formation. A typical feature of these meres is that they are alongside a river rather than having the river flowing through them. In this way, the mere is replenished by seepage from the bed of the lime-rich river, through the river's natural levée, or by winter floods. The water of the mere is then static through the summer, when the concentration of the calcium carbonate rises until it is precipitated on the bed of the mere.

Even quite shallow lake water can develop a thermocline in the short term but where there is a moderately windy climate, the circulation caused by wind drift is sufficient to break this up. (The surface is blown down-wind in a seiche and a return current passes either near the bottom or just above the thermocline if that is present at a sufficient depth.) This means that the bed of the shallow mere is aerated and bottom-feeding fish and wildfowl can survive, providing a livelihood for people around. Expressed more technically, the mere consists entirely of the epilimnion. This is quite unlike Windermere where in summer, there is a sharp thermocline at a depth of 9 to 15 metres (30 to 49 ft), well above the maximum depth of 60 m (200 ft) or so. (M&W p36)

At first sight, the defining feature of a mere is its breadth in relation to its shallow depth. This means that it has a large surface in proportion to the volume of water it contains. However, there is a limiting depth beyond which a lake does not behave as a mere since the sun does not warm the deeper water and the wind does not mix it. Here, a thermocline develops but where the limiting dimensions lie is influenced by the sunniness and windiness of the site and the murkiness of the water. This last usually depends on how eutrophic (rich in plant nutrients) the water is. Nonetheless, in general, with the enlargement of the extent of a mere, the depth has to become proportionately less if it is to behave as a mere.

== English meres ==
- Aqualate Mere, Staffordshire
- Cop Mere, Staffordshire
- Bomere Pool, Shropshire
- Buttermere, Cumbria (Lake District)
- Diss Mere, Norfolk
- Rocklands Mere, Norfolk
- Brooke Mere, Norfolk
- Fowlmere, Cambridgeshire
- Grasmere, Cumbria (Lake District)
- Hornsea Mere, East Riding of Yorkshire
- Horsey Mere, Norfolk
- Martin Mere, Lancashire
- The Meres, south and east of Ellesmere, Shropshire (see below)
- Orton Mere, Cambridgeshire
- Quidenham Mere, Norfolk
- Raby Mere, Merseyside
- Scarborough Mere, North Yorkshire
- Scoulton Mere, Norfolk
- Sea Mere, Norfolk
- Thirlmere, Cumbria (Lake District)
- Thorpeness Meare (Suffolk)
- Windermere, Cumbria (Lake District)
- Marton Mere, Blackpool (Lancashire)

There are many examples in Cheshire, including:

- Alsager Mere
- Budworth Mere
- Comber Mere
- Hatch Mere
- Mere
- Oak Mere
- Pick Mere
- Radnor Mere
- Redes Mere
- Rostherne Mere
- Shakerley Mere
- Tatton Mere

Many examples also occur in north Shropshire, especially around the town of Ellesmere, which is sometimes known as 'the Shropshire lake district', such as:

- Blakemere
- Colemere
- Crosemere
- Ellesmere (The Mere)
- Kettlemere
- Newtonmere
- Sweatmere
- Whitemere

=== Fenland ===
The Fens of eastern England, as well as fen, lowland moor (bog) and other habitats, included a number of meres. As at Martin Mere in Lancashire, when the fens were being drained to convert the land to pasture and arable agriculture, the meres went too but some are easily traced owing to the characteristic soil. For the reasons given above, it is rich in both calcium carbonate and humus. On the ground, its paleness stands out against the surrounding black, humic soils and on the soil map, the former meres show as patches of the Willingham soil association, code number 372 (Soil Map).

Apart from those drained in the medieval period, they are shown in Saxton's map of the counties (as they were in his time) of Cambridgeshire and Huntingdonshire. The following is a list of known meres of the eastern English Fenland with their grid references.

Saxton's meres are named as:

- Trundle Mere TL2091
- Whittlesey Mere TL2291
- Stretham Mere TL5272
- Soham Mere. TL5773
- Ug Mere TL2487
- Ramsey Mere TL3189

In Jonas Moor's "map of the Great Levell of the Fenns" of 1720, though Trundle Mere is not named, the above are all named but one, included with the addition of:

- Benwick Mere TL3489

In the interval, Stretham Mere had gone and the main features of the modern drainage pattern had appeared.

Ugg, Ramsey and Benwick meres do not show in the soil map. Others which do but which appear to have been drained before Saxton's mapping in 1576 are at:

- TL630875
- TL6884
- TL5375
- TL5898

The last appears to be the "mare 'Wide' vocatum" of Robert of Swaffham's version of the Hereward story (Chapter XXVI). If it is, it will have been in existence in the 1070s, when the events of the story took place.

== Meres in Wales ==
- Hanmer Mere, Clwyd
- Marloes Mere, Pembrokeshire

== Meres in the Netherlands ==
Meres similar to those of the English Fens but more numerous and extensive used to exist in the Netherlands, particularly in Holland. See Haarlemmermeer, for example. However, the Dutch word meer is used more generally than the English mere. It means "lake", as also seen in the names of lakes containing meer in Northern Germany, e.g. Steinhuder Meer. When the Zuiderzee was enclosed by a dam and its saltwater became fresh, it changed its status from a sea (zee) to being known as the IJsselmeer, the lake into which the River IJssel flows.

== Australian meres ==
- Beachmere, Queensland
- Austinmer, New South Wales
- Sleaford Mere, South Australia Lat -34.84, Lon 135.74

== General sources ==
- Crossley-Holland, K. (1987). The Poetry of Legend: Classics of the Medieval World Beowulf. ISBN 0-85115-456-5 (C-H)
- Macan, T. T. and Worthington, E. B. (1972). Life in Lakes and Rivers Fontana. (M&W)
- Moor, J. (c1980s). A Map of the Great Levell of the Fenns Extending into ye Countyes of Norfolk, Suffolke, Northampton, Lincoln, Cambridge, Huntingdon and the Isle of Ely facsimile edition by Cambridgeshire Library Service
- Ordnance Survey 1:50,000 Sheets 142 & 143
- Oxford English Dictionary (OED)
- Saxton, C. (1992)[1576]. Christopher Saxton's 16th Century Maps. The counties of England & Wales. With Introduction by William Ravenhill. ISBN 1-85310-354-3. Cambridgeshire map.
- Soils of England and Wales, Sheet 4 Eastern England. Soil Survey of England and Wales (1983). (Soil Map)
- Swaffham, R. (1895-7)[c. 1260]. Gesta Herwardi. Transcribed by S. H. Miller and translated by W. D. Sweeting.
