= Old Buckenham High School =

Location
- Abbey Road; Old Buckenham, Norfolk, NR17 1RL; England; 52°29′04″N 1°02′35″E

Information
- Type: Academy
- Motto: Community Ambition Respect
- Established: 1938
- Local authority: Norfolk County Council
- Trust: Sapentia Educational Trust
- Department for Education URN: 146144 Tables
- Ofsted: Reports
- Headteacher: Paul Beale
- Gender: Co-educational
- Age: 11 to 16
- Enrollment: 492
- Capacity: 575
- Houses: Attenborough Turing Malala Rashford
- Colour
- Website: http://www.obhs.co.uk/

Old Buckenham High School is a co-educational secondary school located in Old Buckenham in the English county of Norfolk.

== History ==
The school was first established in 1938 as Old Buckenham Area School for 5- to 14-year-old pupils. It was later changed to a comprehensive school for 11- to 16-year-olds. The school was awarded specialist Sports College status in September 2010.

Previously a community school administered by Norfolk County Council, in September 2018 Old Buckenham High School converted to academy status and is now sponsored by the Sapentia Educational Trust.

The school previously had 5 houses, rather than the current 4. the 5 being Borrow (Blue), Coke (yellow), Crome (red), Fry (purple), and Townshend (green), named after significant figures in Norfolk history. The names were changed with a schoolwide vote in 2021.

== Admissions ==
Primary schools that feed into Old Buckenham High School include Banham Primary School, Bunwell Primary School, Carleton Rode Primary School, East Harling Primary School, Eccles Hargham and Wilby Primary School, Kenninghall Primary School and Old Buckenham Primary School.

== School profile ==
When Ofsted visited in 2015 it found a smaller than average 11–16 comprehensive school serving a rural area of Norfolk. It was judged to be good. Most of the students were White British and the proportion of students who come from minority ethnic groups is well below average. The proportion of students for whom English is an additional language was very low: there were few disadvantaged students entitled or eligible for free school meals. The school met the government's floor standards for students’ attainment and progress.
