= Caston Windmill =

Tower mill at Caston, Norfolk, England

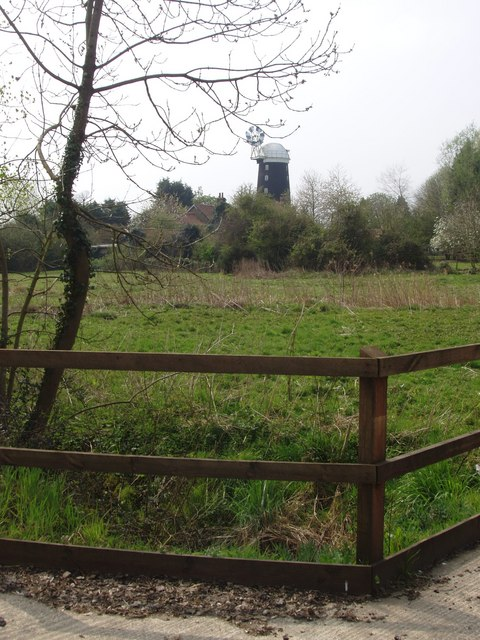
- Caston Windmill
- Interactive map of Caston Windmill

Origin
- Mill name: Caston Windmill
- Mill location: TL 9510 9816
- Operator: Private
- Year built: 1864

Information
- Purpose: Corn mill
- Type: Tower mill
- Storeys: Six storeys
- No. of sails: Four sails
- Type of sails: Double Patent sails
- Windshaft: cast iron
- Winding: Fantail
- Fantail blades: Six blades
- Auxiliary power: Hornsby Oil engine
- No. of pairs of millstones: Three pairs, a fourth pair driven by engine.
- Size of millstones: 4 feet (1.22 m)

Caston Tower Windmill is a grade II* listed tower mill at Caston, Norfolk, England which is under restoration. The mill is also a scheduled monument.

== History ==
Caston Windmill was built in 1864, replacing a post mill which had been standing in 1834. The tower was built by William Wright, a local builder, and fitted out by millwright Robert Hambling of East Dereham. It bears a date stone inscribed EW 1864, referring to Edward Wyer, who had owned the post mill.

The mill caught fire during a storm on 24 March 1895 but it is not recorded how much damage was done. The Watton fire brigade were called upon to deal with the fire. Edward Wyer ran the mill until his death on 5 July 1897. His property was offered for sale by auction on 7 October 1897 at the Dukes Head public house, Caston, but remained unsold. Wyer's son James took the mill and ran it until 1910 when he retired. In that year, Wyer's brother-in-law Benjamin Knott took the mill. A new stock was fitted in August 1915 and a new sail fitted by Robert Martin, millwright of Beccles, Suffolk, in September 1922, at which date the mill was painted. Knott ran the mill until 1940, latterly in partnership with his son James.

During Knott's tenure, a Hornsby oil engine was installed in the granary, driving a further pair of millstones. In 1940, the mill was sold to James Bilham, who used the engine driven millstones for milling, and removed the two pairs of Peak millstones from the windmill. Bilham died in 1967 and the mill was sold by his widow in October 1969.

The mill was bought by millwright John Lawn, who intended to restore the mill to working order. The granary was converted to residential accommodation. Lawn entered into partnership with Philip Lennard as Lennard and Lawn (Millwrights) Ltd, at the time the only professional millwrights based in Norfolk. Lennard & Lawn did a lot of work for the Norfolk Windmills Trust and consequently the restoration of Caston Mill took place on an "as and when" basis.

The cap and sails were removed on 23 November 1983. John Lawn died in January 2000. A memorial plaque was dedicated to him at Old Buckenham. The cap was refitted to Caston Mill in 2000.

== Description ==
Caston Windmill is a six-storey tower mill with a two storey granary attached. There is a stage at second floor level. The tower is 26 feet (7.92 m) outside diameter at ground level with walls 2 feet 6 inches (760 mm) thick. It is 17 feet (5.18 m) outside diameter at curb level. The tower is 55 feet (16.76 m) tall to curb level. The boat-shaped cap is winded by a six-bladed fantail. The four double Patent sails have ten bays. Eight bays carried three shutters and two bays carried two shutters. The sails are carried on a cast-iron windshaft, which also carries a 10 feet 4 inches (3.15 m) diameter wooden clasp arm brake wheel. The cast-iron wallower is carried on a wooden upright shaft. The three pairs of millstones were driven underdrift.

== Millers ==
- Edward Wyer (1864–97)
- James Wyer (1897–1910)
- Benjamin Knott (1910–?)
- Benjamin & James Knott (?–1940)
- James Bilham (1940–67)
