= Mill Lane Mill, Carbrooke =

Windmill in Carbrooke, Norfolk, England

Carbrooke Windmill
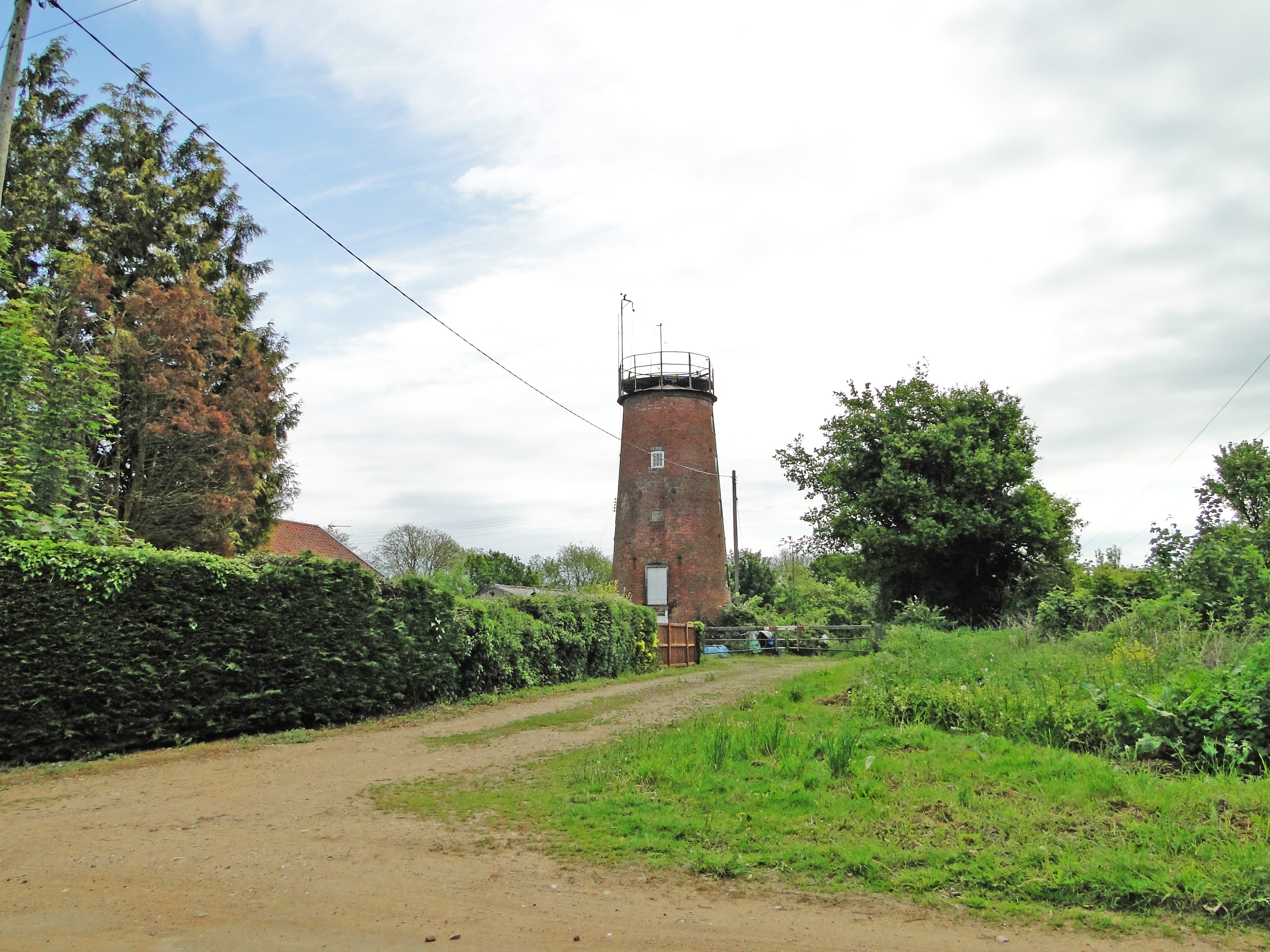
- Mill Lane Mill in 2019
- Interactive map of Carbrooke Windmill

Origin
- Mill name: Mill Lane Mill, Carbrooke
- Mill location: TF 9524 0096
- Coordinates: 52°34′17″N 0°52′46″E
- Operator: Private
- Year built: 1856

Information
- Purpose: Corn mill
- Type: Tower mill
- Storeys: Five storeys
- No. of sails: Four sails
- Type of sails: Double Patent sails
- Windshaft: cast iron
- Winding: Fantail
- Fantail blades: Eight blades
- Auxiliary power: Steam engine, later replaced by a Crossley paraffin engine
- No. of pairs of millstones: Three pairs, plus a fourth pair driven by engine
- Size of millstones: Windmill:- 3 feet 6 inches (1.07 m), 4 feet (1.22 m) and 4 feet 6 inches (1.37 m) diameter

Mill Lane Mill is a Grade II listed tower mill at Carbrooke, Norfolk, England which has been conserved with some machinery remaining.

== History ==
Mill Lane Mill was built in 1856, replacing a post mill which had been standing in 1811. The mill was built for Richard Dewing of Carbrooke Hall. Dewing died on 22 November 1876 and the estate was managed by Edward May Dewing. A steam engine had been installed as auxiliary power by 1888, driving a separate pair of millstones. The mill was offered for sale by auction on 30 July 1900 at the Mart, London EC. It was bought by Herbert Jeremiah Minns, who was the sitting tenant. The mill was part freehold and part copyhold. A pair of sails from Little Cressingham were fitted in 1920. Minns died on 16 August 1921 and the mill passed to his son Herbert Willie Minns. In 1932, the sails were removed by Martins, millwrights of Beccles, Suffolk.

In that year a 1911 13/17 hp (10/13 kW) Crossley hot bulb paraffin engine was installed. This has previously powered a searchlight during the First World War and had subsequently been used at Hall Farm, Carbrooke. Milling continued until 1943 using the engine as the source of power. The mill was conveyed to Herbert Henry Minns on 1 August 1967. The cap frame and windshaft were removed in October 1979 by millwright John Lawn and a temporary cap fitted to the mill. Later, a small wind turbine was affixed to the top of the tower. The mill retains all machinery from wallower down.

== Description ==
Mill Lane Mill is a five storey tower mill. The tower is 17 feet (5.18 m) internal diameter at ground level with walls 2 feet (610 mm) thick. It had a boat shaped cap winded by an eight bladed fantail. There were four double Patent sails, carried on a 12 feet 6 inches (3.81 m) longcast iron windshaft. The last sails carried were an odd pair. Those on the inner stock had eight bays of three shutters while those on the outer stock had nine bays of three shutters. The latter sails had previously been on Little Cressingham Mill. The windshaft was cast by W H Wigg & Co, millwrights of East Dereham, and dates to 1879/80. The brake wheel drove a cast iron wallower which was cast by G R Cowen & Co, Nottingham and dates to 1871 at the earliest. Other machinery in the mill is said to have been made in Belgium. It was made to metric measurements. The 8 feet 6 inches (2.6 m) diameter great spur wheel is of cast iron with wooden cogs. The stone nuts are of cast iron. One has 20 cogs, one has 24 cogs and the third has 25 cogs.

== Millers ==
- Henry Knights (1856–63)
- George Goddard (1863–78)
- Samuel Goddard (1879–90)
- Herbert Jeremiah Minns (1892–1921)
- Herbert Willie Minns (1921–43)

Reference for above:-
