= Threxton, All Saints =

Church in Threxton, Norfolk, England

Coordinates: 52.5663°N 0.7796°E

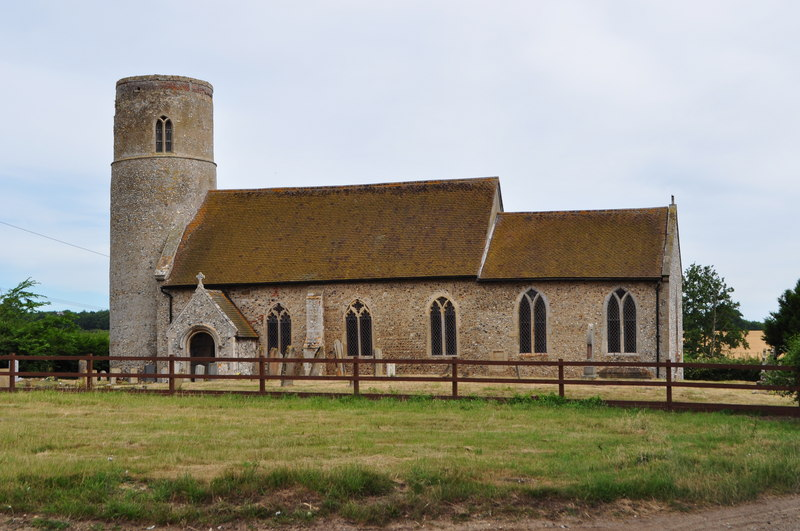
All Saints' Church, Threxton

Threxton All Saints is a round-tower church at Threxton Hill, situated east of the village of Little Cressingham and west of the town of Watton in the English county of Norfolk. The church is medieval with a late 13th-century tower as well as a 14th-century octagonal font, and remnants of medieval stained glass in at least one window. The building is a Grade I listed building and retains some wall decorations which survived the Reformation after being partitioned as part of a mausoleum, and were uncovered during the late 20th century.
