= Old Buckenham Fen =

Protected area in Norfolk, England

Coordinates: 52.487°N 1.013°E

- Site of Special Scientific Interest
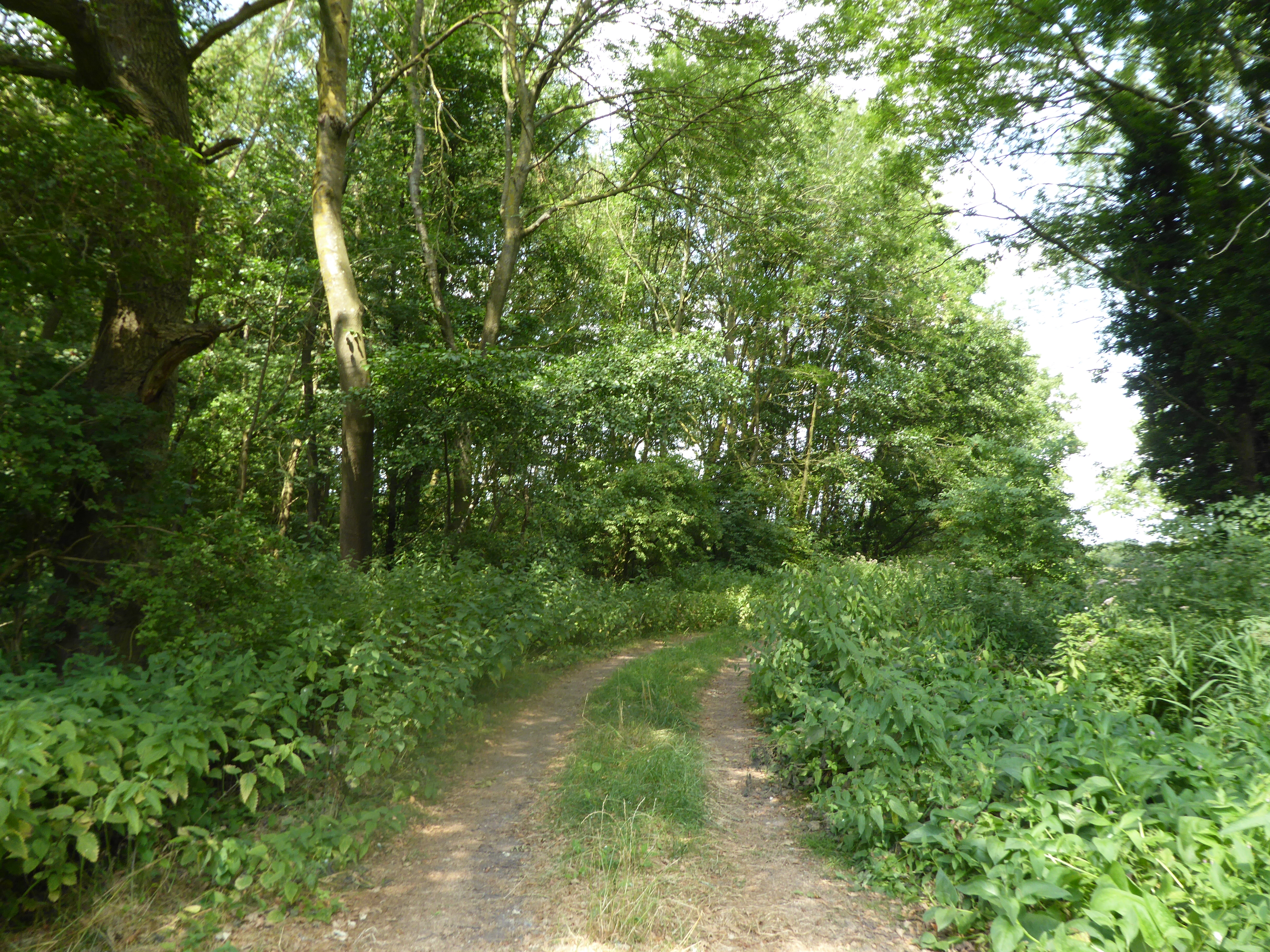
- Location of Old Buckenham Fen.
- Area of search: Norfolk
- Grid reference: TM 047 919
- Interest: Biological
- Area: 34.5 hectares (85 acres)
- Notification date: 1986
- Location map: Magic Map

Old Buckenham Fen is a 34.5-hectare (85-acre) biological Site of Special Scientific Interest south of Attleborough in Norfolk, England.

This valley fen has cattle grazed wet meadows, species rich reedbeds, a mere and dykes. Flora in wetter areas include ragged robin, marsh thistle and ladies smock.

Most of the site is private land but there is a public footpath in the south-west corner.
