= Beetley =

Village and civil parish in the Breckland district of Norfolk, England

Coordinates: 52.717°N 0.917°E

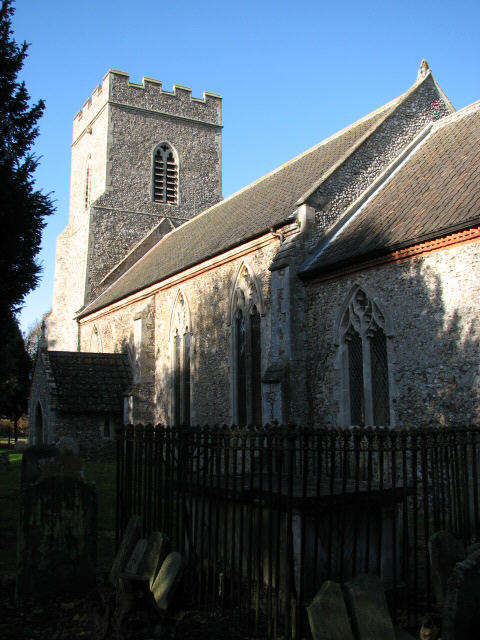
- St Mary Magdalene's church, Old Beetley

- Location within Norfolk
- Area: 11.02 km^{2} (4.25 sq mi)
- Population: 1,396 (2011 census)
  - Density: 127/km^{2} (330/sq mi)
- Civil parish: Beetley
- District: Breckland
- Shire county: Norfolk
- Region: East
- Country: England
- Sovereign state: United Kingdom
- Post town: DEREHAM
- Postcode district: NR20
- Dialling code: 01362
- Police: Norfolk
- Fire: Norfolk
- Ambulance: East of England

Beetley is a village and civil parish in the Breckland district of Norfolk, England. According to the 2011 census the parish had a population of 1,396. The village is 4 miles (6.4 km) north of Dereham.

== History ==
At the Domesday survey of 1086, Beetley was part of the Manor of Elmham, held by William Beaufoe, Bishop of Thetford. Beetley was then part of the parish of Bittering Magna, however the Parish divided into Beetley and Gressenhall. Beetley was combined with the neighbouring parish of East Bilney in 1935. Between 1870 and 1872, an excerpt was written about the town

BEETLEY, a parish in Mitford district, Norfolk; 2 miles WSW of Elmham r. station, and 4 N by W of East Dereham. Post Town, Elmham, under Thetford. Acres, 1,770. Real property, £2,870. Pop., 363. Houses, 82. The property is divided among a few. The living is a rectory, annexed to the rectory of East Bilney, in the diocese of Norwich. The church is good.

== Government ==
The parish council consists of seven councillors. The village is in Lincoln ward of the Breckland district of Norfolk, and is part of the Necton and Launditch Ward at County level. It is part of the Mid Norfolk parliamentary constituency.

== Geography ==
Beetley is: 17 miles (27 km) north-west of Norwich and 95 miles (153 km) north-east of London. According to the British Geological Survey, Beetley has a superficial deposit of glacial sand and gravel, with bedrock of sandstone and mudstone with veins of white chalk.

== Demography ==
Since 1801 the population has grown from 242 to 1,396 in 2011.

== Landmarks ==
Beetley Village Hall was built in the 1960s and is in the centre of the parish, surrounded by a playing field. The site is protected by Fields in Trust through a legal "Deed of Dedication", safeguarding the future of the space.

The parish church is dedicated to St Mary-Magdalen and is believed to be on the site of the church mentioned in the Domesday Book, although the building itself is dated to 1320. The tower was made taller during the 16th Century. The north aisle was demolished in the 18th century, with windows installed in the wall.

The village has a primary school.
