= Bridgham =

Village in Norfolk, England

Coordinates: 52.42°N 00.86°E

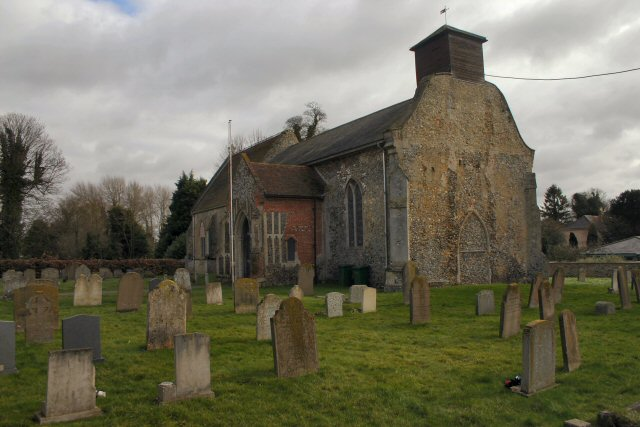
- Church of St. Mary the Virgin, Bridgham

- Location within Norfolk
- Area: 11.06 km^{2} (4.27 sq mi)
- Population: 373 (2021)
  - Density: 34/km^{2} (88/sq mi)
- OS grid reference: TL9585
- District: Breckland
- Shire county: Norfolk
- Region: East
- Country: England
- Sovereign state: United Kingdom
- Post town: NORWICH
- Postcode district: NR16
- Dialling code: 01953
- Police: Norfolk
- Fire: Norfolk
- Ambulance: East of England
- UK Parliament: South West Norfolk

Bridgham is a village and civil parish in the English county of Norfolk. It is around 6 miles (9.7 km) north-east of Thetford and 22 miles (35 km) south-west of Norwich. The River Thet runs through the parish.

Bridgham's name is of Anglo-Saxon origin and in the Domesday Book it is recorded as a settlement of 11 households in the hundred of Shropham. The village was part of the estates of St. Etheldreda's Abbey in Ely. At the 2021 census, Bridgham has a population of 373 people which shows a slight increase from the 335 people recorded in the 2011 census.

== Church of St. Mary ==
Bridgham's parish church is dedicated to Saint Mary and dates from the 14th century. The building is Grade II listed. It has a carved chalk font as well as stained-glass designed by A. L. Moore in 1900.
