= East Bilney =

Village in Norfolk, England

Coordinates: 52.740183°N 0.88422507°E

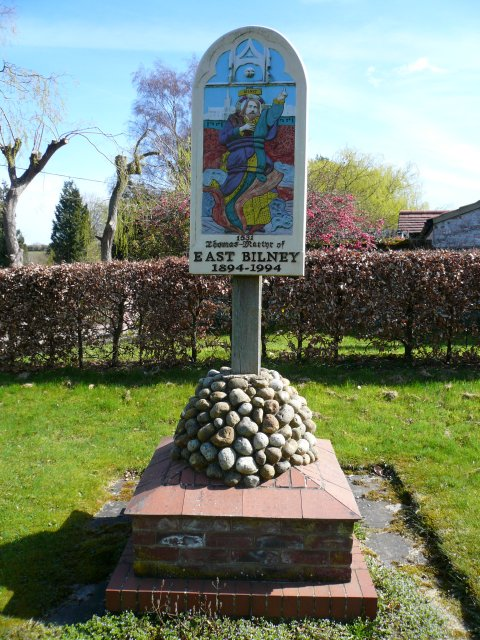

- Location within Norfolk
- Civil parish: Beetley
- District: Breckland
- Shire county: Norfolk
- Region: East
- Country: England
- Sovereign state: United Kingdom
- Post town: DEREHAM
- Postcode district: NR20
- Dialling code: 01362
- Police: Norfolk
- Fire: Norfolk
- Ambulance: East of England
- UK Parliament: Mid Norfolk

East Bilney is a village and former civil parish, now in the parish of Beetley, in the Breckland district of the English county of Norfolk.

East Bilney is located 7.8 kilometres (4.8 mi) north-west of Dereham and 30 kilometres (19 mi) north-west of Norwich.

== History ==
The Fen Causeway, a Roman road between Denver and Durobrivae, passed through the village and there is further evidence of a Roman settlement.

East Bilney's name is of Anglo-Saxon origin and derives from the Old English for the eastern portion of Billa's island.

East Bilney has no listing in the Domesday Book but the land that forms the village today was part of the East Anglian estates of William de Warenne.

== Geography ==
In 1931, the parish had a population of 117 this was the last time separate population statistics were recorded for East Bilney as on 1 April 1935, the parish was abolished and merged with Beetley.

East Bilney is bisected by the B1146, between Fakenham and Dereham.

== St. Mary's Church ==
East Bilney's former parish church is dedicated to Saint Mary and was built in the early Nineteenth Century to replace a ramshackle Medieval church on the same site. St. Mary's is located on Fludges Lane and has been Grade II listed since 1960.

which was incidentally drawn by John Berney Ladbrooke in the 1820s. St. Mary's has good examples of stained glass depicting Saint Michael and Saint Alban installed by James Powell and Sons and a depiction of the Sixteenth Century martyr Thomas Bilney installed by Shrigley and Hunt. In addition, there is evidence to suggest that the tower and chancel of St. Mary's were destroyed during Kett's Rebellion of 1549.

== Notable residents ==
- Dr. Andrew Perne (ca. 1519 – 1589), Vice-Chancellor of Cambridge University and Dean of Ely

== Governance ==
East Bilney is part of the electoral ward of Lincoln for local elections and is part of the district of Breckland.

The village's national constituency is Mid Norfolk which has been represented by the Conservative's George Freeman MP since 2010.

== War memorial ==
East Bilney War Memorial is a stone obelisk in St. Mary's Churchyard which lists the following names for the First World War:

Rank	Name	Unit	Date of death	Burial
Lt.	Douglas F. Hervey	1/5th Bn., Norfolk Regiment	17 May 1917	Cairo War Cemetery
Cpl.	William Isbell	1st Bn., Norfolk Regt.	25 Nov. 1917	St. Mary's Churchyard
Pte.	Victor B. King	2nd Bn., Canterbury Infantry Regiment, NZEF	15 Sep. 1916	Caterpillar Valley Cemetery
Pte.	Arthur L. Barnard	1/8th Bn., Royal Scots	9 Apr. 1918	Mont-Bernanchon Cemetery
