= Little Cressingham Windmill =

Mill building in Norfolk, England

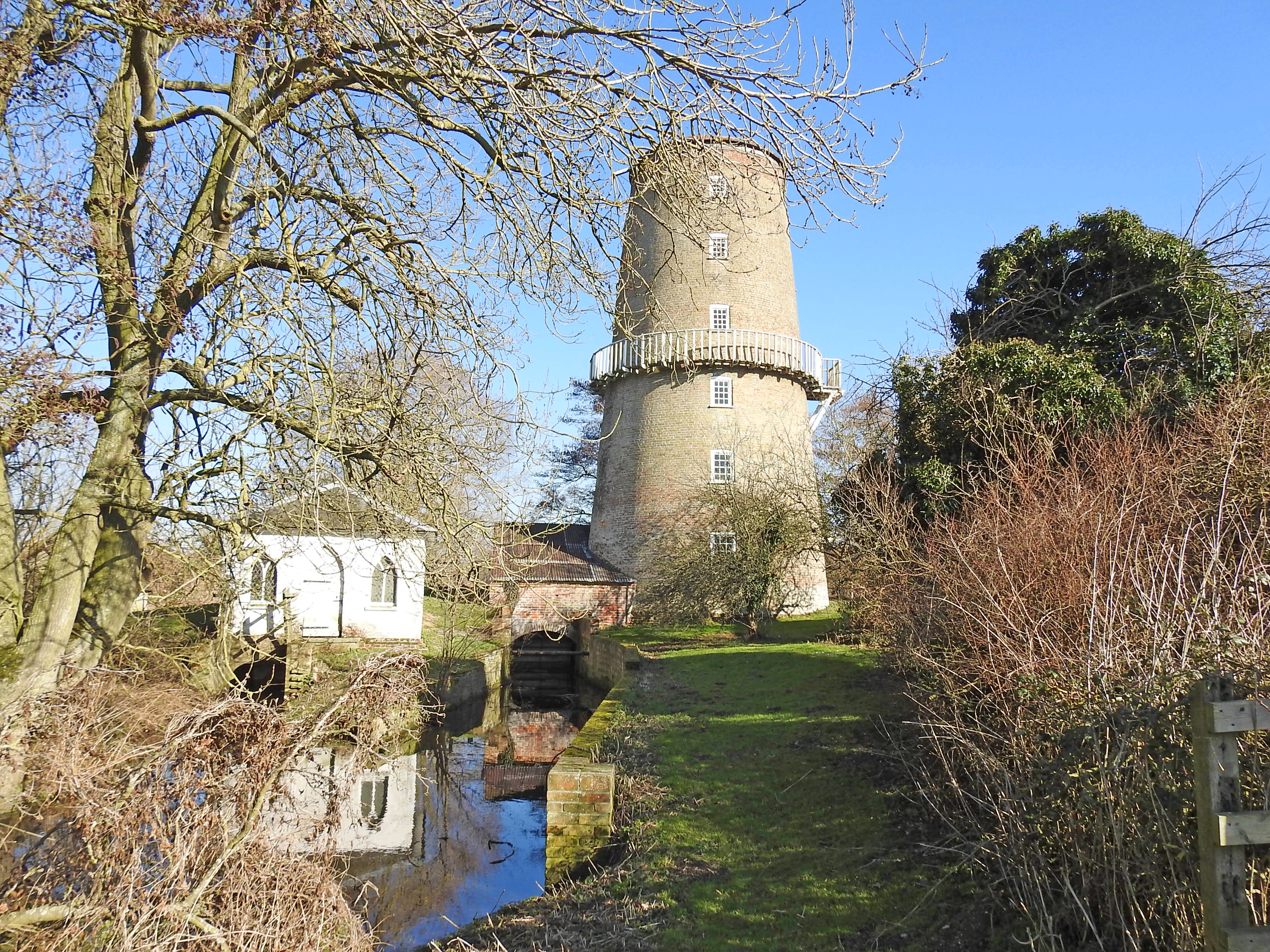
- Little Cressingham wind and water mill, February 2019
- Interactive map of Little Cressingham Windmill

Origin
- Mill name: Little Cressingham Mill
- Mill location: Little Cressingham, Norfolk, United Kingdom
- Grid reference: TF 8697 0012
- Coordinates: 52°34′03″N 0°45′26″E
- Operator: Norfolk Windmills Trust
- Year built: 1821

Information
- Purpose: Flour mill, also water pumping
- Type: Tower mill and watermill
- Storeys: Six storey tower
- No. of sails: Four
- Type of sails: Patent sails
- Winding: Fantail
- Fantail blades: Six
- Auxiliary power: Portable steam engine, later a paraffin engine
- No. of pairs of millstones: Four pairs - two driven by wind, two driven by water
- Size of millstones: All 4 feet 0 inches (1.22 m) diameter
- Type of pump: Ram pump
- Other information: Also a water pump

Little Cressingham Windmill is a combined wind and water mill at Little Cressingham, Norfolk, United Kingdom. It was built in 1821. The mill worked by wind until 1916 and water until 1952. The mill has been conserved by the Norfolk Windmills Trust and is occasionally open to the public.

== History ==
A watermill stood on this site in 1780. A smock mill was built in 1782 by millwright John Browne of Norwich for miller William Trundle. The two mills were worked together. John Pearson was the miller from 1793 to 1797. Thomas Norman was the miller in 1802.

The tower mill was built in 1821. A Bramah pump powered by a waterwheel had been installed by 1844 to pump water to Clermont House. The mill was offered for sale that year. John Marsh was then the miller. He was followed by Benjamin Land from 1850 to 1853, Robert Chapman from 1854 to 1879 and Herbert John Chapman from 1883 to 1890. Samuel Goddard took the mill at Michaelmas 1890, having previously been at Carbrookd. He died on Christmas Day of carbon monoxide poisoning. He and his wife having took a bucket of lighted coals up to their bedroom to keep warm. John Dowe was the miller in 1892, then John Goldson Mason from 1896 to 1898 and Frederick Panton Rodwell from 1900 to 1904. Rodwell also ran a watermill at Hilborough. Horace Freestone took the mill in 1907. The mill lost a pair of sails in 1911, which were replaced. The mill was tailwinded in 1916. Declared uneconomic to repair, it did not work by wind again. A Tattersall roller mill was installed in 1918, driven by the waterwheel or by the engine. The sails were removed in 1920. One pair was subsequently erected on Mill Lane Mill, Carbrooke. Horace Freestone died in 1924 and the mill was worked by his widow until her death in 1928. Their sons George and Horace took the mill. In 1934, the Bramah pump was replaced by a hydraulic ram made by Green & Carter, Kingsworthy, Hampshire. A second ram was added in 1935. The mill still had its cap in autumn 1940. C.1940, the cap, sails and top section of the upright shaft were removed and the mill capped by a flat concrete roof. A manhole was provided, but the cover provided was not placed on it, which was to lead to extensive rot in the upper part of the mill in later years. George Freestone died in 1951. His widow Dora ran the mill for another year, but then gave up the tenancy. The mill was listed Grade II* on 9 July 1951.

The millpond was filled in c.1972. The mill was bought in 1980 by John E. Davies of Clermont House. He leased the mill to the Norfolk Windmills Trust for 25 years in 1981 at a peppercorn rent. Work on the mill commenced in September 1981. Millwright John Lawn of Caston undertaking the work. In 1982, party of students from Wayland High School, Watton cleared the head and tail races of the watermill under a Duke of Edinburgh's Award scheme. The mill was opened to the public for the first time on 17 October 1982. The pumphouse for the Bramah pump was repaired in 1988. There are occasional open days at the mill.

== Description ==
=== Windmill ===
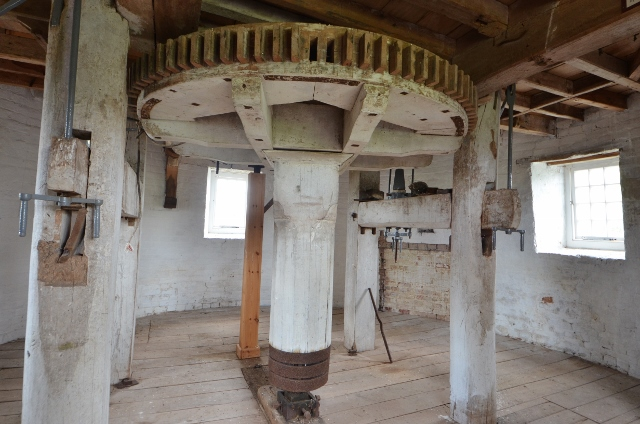
The upper meal floor and great spur wheel.

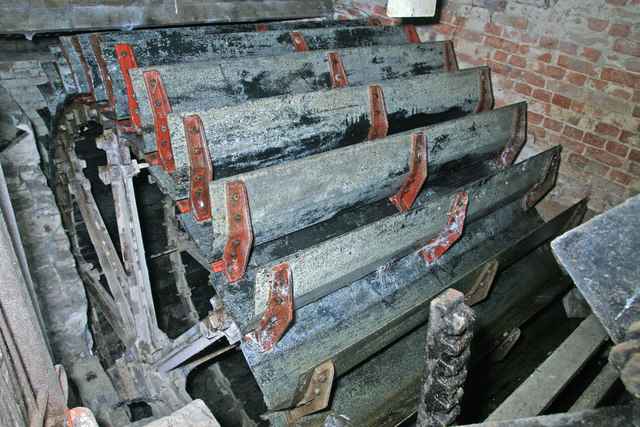
The waterwheel

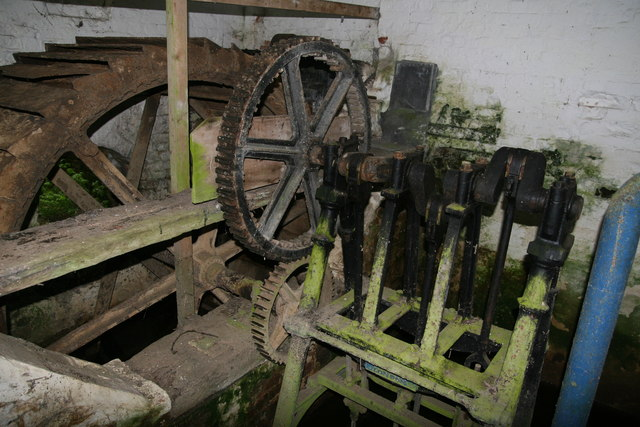
The Bramah pump

Little Cressingham Windmill is a six storey tower mill. The tower is about 50 feet 0 inches (15.24 m) tall. It had a boat shape cap with a gallery. The mill had four double Patent sails, which had eight bays of three shutters. It was winded by a six-bladed fantail. The wallower, at the top of the upright shaft, had 26 teeth. The great spur wheel was of clasp arm construction. Two pairs of French Burr millstones were driven underdrift.

=== Watermill ===
The watermill is incorporated into the lower floors of the windmill. The breastshot waterwheel is of cast iron. It is 12 feet 0 inches (3.66 m) diameter and 6 feet 0 inches (1.83 m) wide and has 40 floats. It drives two pairs of millstones; one pair are French Burr and the other pair are Peaks. A roller mill was located on the same floor as the water-driven stones. It was powered by the watermill or by the engine.

=== Pump ===
A Bramah pump is housed in an outbuilding by the watermill wheelhouse. The waterwheel is 8 feet 0 inches (2.44 m) diameter by 3 feet 0 inches (91 cm) wide. The pump is a 3 ram pump.
