= Worthing, Norfolk =

Village in Norfolk, England

Coordinates: 52.74°N 00.96°E

Worthing
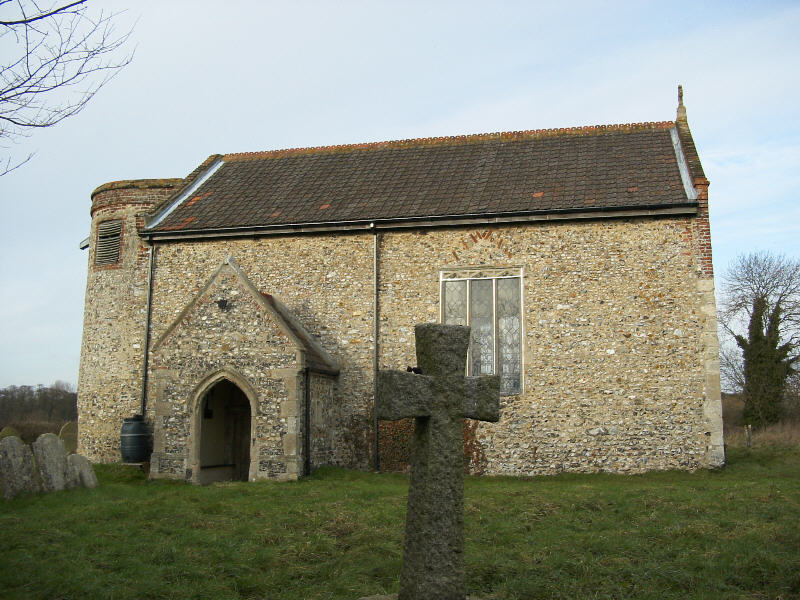
- Worthing St. Margaret

- Location within Norfolk
- Civil parish: Hoe and Worthing
- District: Breckland
- Shire county: Norfolk
- Region: East
- Country: England
- Sovereign state: United Kingdom

Worthing is a small village and former civil parish, now in the parish of Hoe and Worthing, in the Breckland district, in the county of Norfolk, England. The civil parish of Worthing is now merged with that of the neighbouring village of Hoe, though the ecclesiastical parishes are still separate (see below). In 1931 the parish had a population of 120. On 1 April 1935 Worthing was abolished and merged with Hoe, the renamed parish is now called "Hoe and Worthing".

== Parish church ==
Its church, dedicated to St. Margaret, is one of 124 extant round-tower churches in Norfolk. Once a larger building, the upper section of the round tower was removed in the 18th-century, and the chancel was demolished at a date between 1721 and 1820. What remains is the original nave, and the lower section of the tower, together with the small porch. The church features in Pevsner.

The parish of Worthing is now part of the Heart of Norfolk Benefice, a group of thirteen parishes and churches which operate collectively, with a shared parish priest. The benefice is part of the Diocese of Norwich. The church is open daily, thanks to an automated keyless entry system installed by the PCC.

== Railway ==
The Mid-Norfolk Railway operates a heritage railway service to a location near to the village, just a few yards to the north of Worthing level crossing. Regular services currently stop at Dereham railway station, but special sightseeing trains continued northwards to Worthing on 19 May 2018. Although no station is available, Worthing is indicated on the Mid-Norfolk Railway's timetable as the northerly limit of operations.

== Facilities ==
Apart from the church and the railway, local community facilities have closed. Worthing's two pubs, The Tanners Arms and The Swan Inn, had both closed by the mid 1960s, and are now private houses. The village store, blacksmiths, and fishmongers have all closed, as have employers including the gravel pits and the tannery which provided much employment during the twentieth century. In August 1966 the local Dereham Times newspaper ran an illustrated article under the title Worthing hamlet is in its death throes, reporting Worthing's population as 120 in 1931, 57 in 1963, and just 43 in 1965. The local postman was quoted as stating that he delivered post to only 23 occupied dwellings in Worthing.
