= Little Cressingham =

Village in Norfolk, England

Coordinates: 52.5656°N 0.7645°E

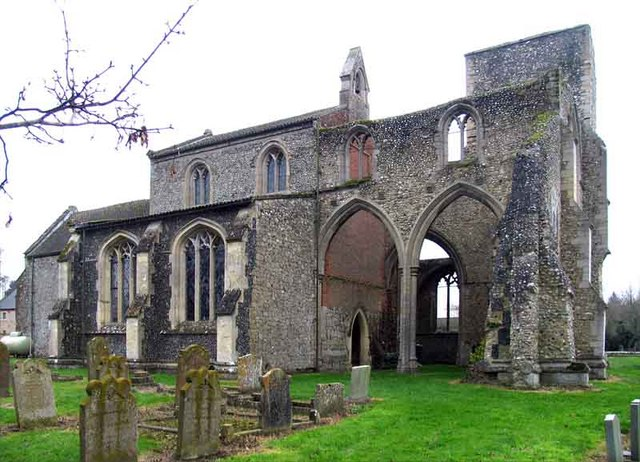
- St Andrew, Little Cressingham

- Location within Norfolk
- Area: 11.90 km^{2} (4.59 sq mi)
- Population: (2001 census)
- OS grid reference: TF873000
- District: Breckland
- Shire county: Norfolk
- Region: East
- Country: England
- Sovereign state: United Kingdom
- Post town: THETFORD
- Postcode district: IP25
- Dialling code: 01953
- Police: Norfolk
- Fire: Norfolk
- Ambulance: East of England
- UK Parliament: South West Norfolk

Little Cressingham lies 2.5 miles (4.0 km) south east by road from Great Cressingham, 3 miles (4.8 km) west of Watton and 8 miles (13 km) south of Swaffham in the Breckland District of Norfolk. It covers an area of 11.90 km^{2} (4.59 sq mi) and had a population of 157 in 70 households at the 2001 census It is in the civil parish of Great Cressingham. The village is located on the edge of the Stanford Battle Area.

The village's name origin is uncertain but probably means 'Homestead/village of Cressa's people', or perhaps, 'cress homestead/village'.

The village is dispersed, with the main centre focused on a crossroads around the church and the mill. The village church is dedicated to St Andrew and is partially ruined. The building is medieval and designated as a Grade I listed building. The village is in the Benefice of Cockley Cley. The round tower Church of All Saints at Threxton lies 0.5 miles (0.8 km) to the east of the village.

The village pub, The White Horse, closed in 2004. Next to the church is the old Free School founded and endowed by William Farrer in 1809 and built at a cost of £144. It is now the village hall. The mill at Little Cressingham, a Grade II* listed building, is both a water and wind mill, one of only two in Norfolk. It was built in about 1820 on the Clermont Estate and is now disused.

== Bronze Age ==
In 1849 Early Bronze Age finds attributed to the Wessex culture dating from c. 2000 BC were discovered in Little Cressingham, consisting of a rectangular gold plaque, three small cylindrical gold boxes, an amber necklace, a bronze dagger and bronze knife, and human remains. The finds are now on display at the Norwich Castle Museum.

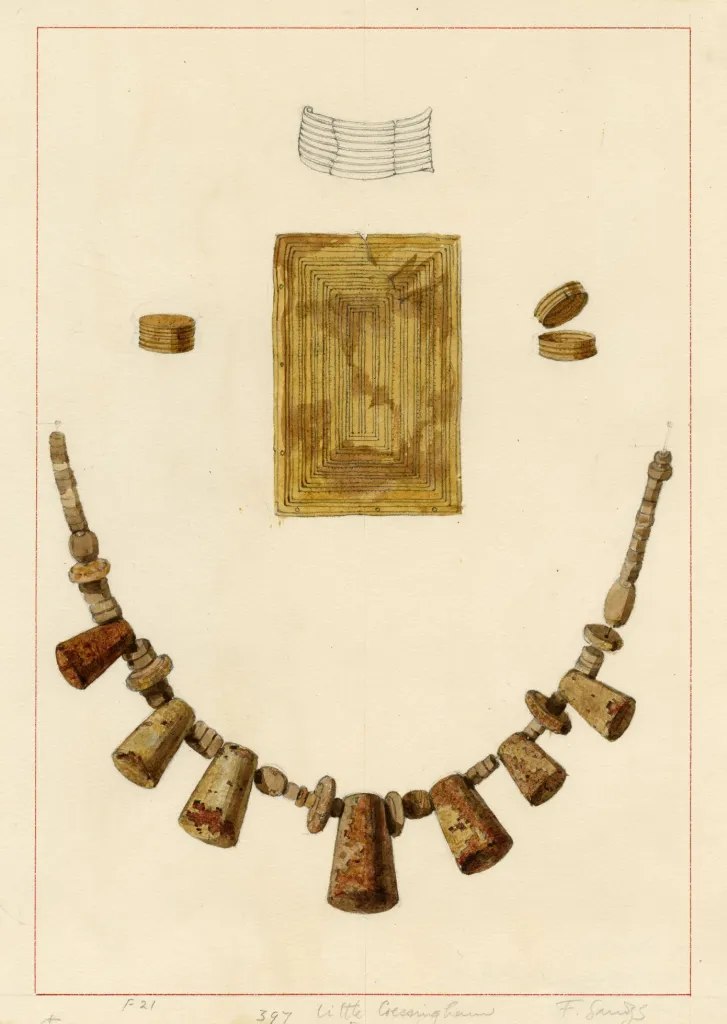
Gold plaque, boxes and amber necklace, c. 2000 BC

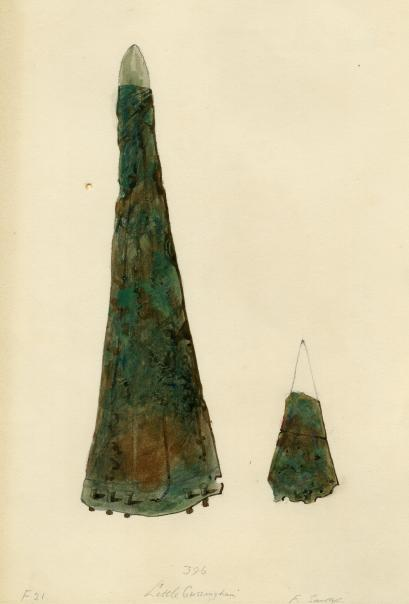
Bronze dagger and knife, c. 2000 BC

== Clermont estate ==
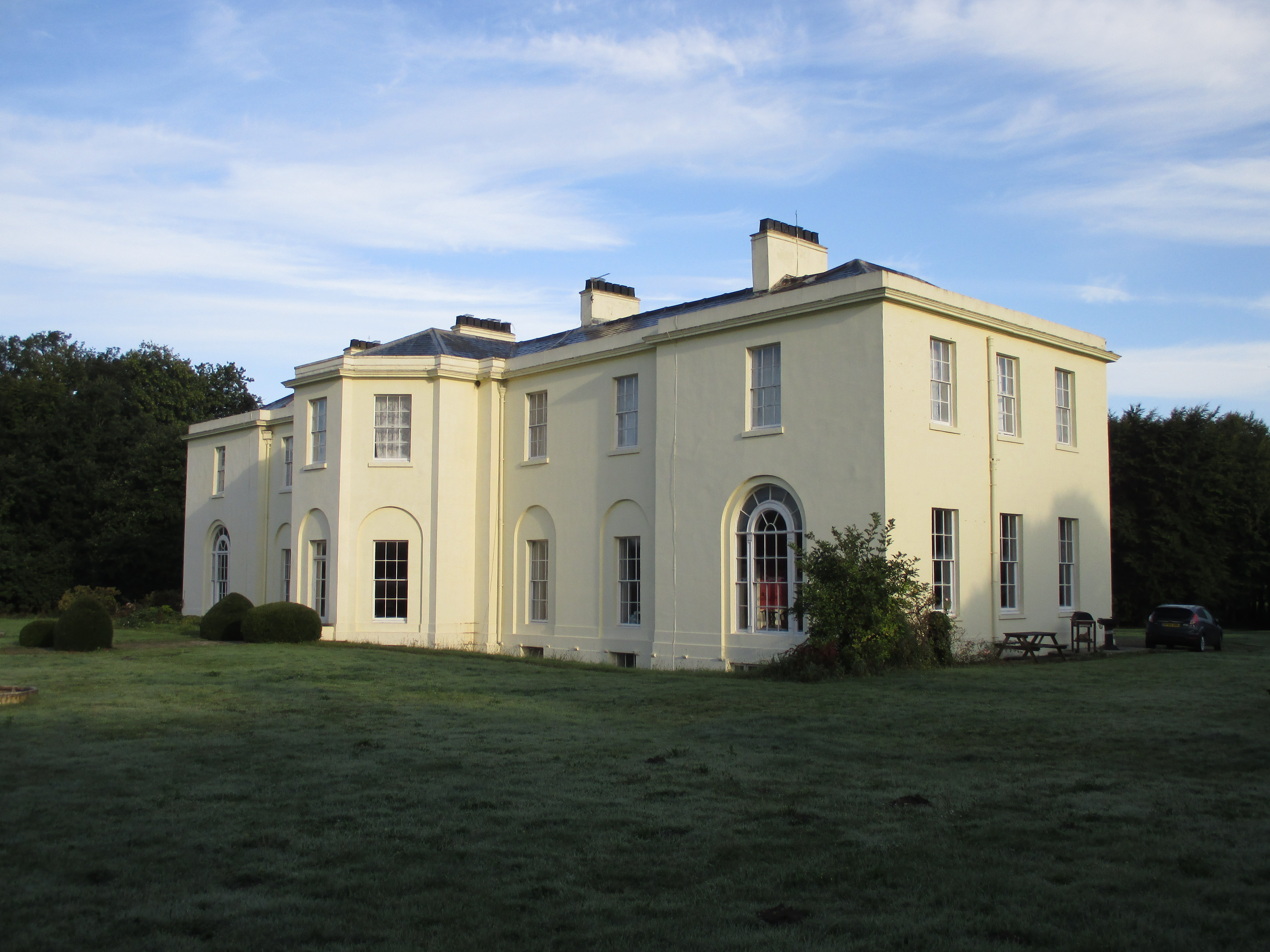
Clermont Hall

The Clermont Estate in Threxton, hamlet near Little Cressingham, was created by the Irish peer William Henry Fortescue (1722–1806), Earl of Clermont, friend of the Prince of Wales. He built Clermont Lodge as a shooting box and it was extended for his nephew and heir William Charles Fortescue (1764–1829), Viscount Clermont to designs by the architect William Pilkington. Pilkington was a pupil and assistant to Sir Robert Taylor (architect of the Bank of England).

Following Viscount Clermont's death without issue Clermont Estate was sold to Sir Francis Lyttleton Holyoake Goodricke in 1844 and in 1858 it was purchased by the 2nd Duke of Wellington. In 1863 he conveyed the Hilborough and Clermont Estates to John Remington Mills. (Note: John Remington Mills was one of two sons of Samuel Mills (d 1847) of Russell Square. Both sons bought country estates. Thomas Mills, barrister and MP, bought Tolmers in Hertfordshire (which his brother inherited) and John Remington Mills bought the Hilborough and Clermont Estates at Little Cressingham, retaining property and business interests in London and elsewhere.) In 1869 Mills bought the Watton estate and an outlying farm at Tottenhill in Norfolk. His son Joseph Trueman Mills added the South Pickenham estate, Norfolk.

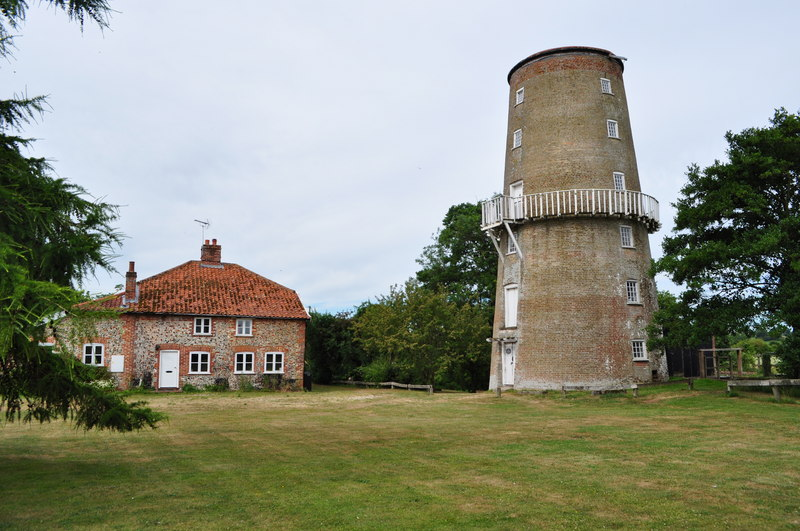
Little Cressingham Wind/Watermill

The last owner of Clermont Hall was Sir Richard Prince-Smith (Note: Richard Prince-Smith died in June 2007 at his home in Rancho Mirage, California. Yorkshire Post: Obituary) who acquired the estate in 1966 and sold it in 1997. The estate, which originally extended to 2,734 acres (11.06 km^{2}), was broken up from 1977 onwards. Much of it is now owned by the UK Ministry of Defence.

Clermont House was built in 1971/2 in the walled garden of Clermont Hall as a replacement for Clermont Hall and as an agent's house. John Davies, Prince-Smith's resident land agent from 1971 to 1997, bought Clermont House in 1977. Davies added to the house in later years and in 1983 developed an arboretum extending 13 acres (53,000 m^{2}) which is open to public visitors. In 1972 Clermont Hall was found to be riddled with dry rot but attempts to demolish were thwarted by the imposition of a preservation order. The hall was sold in 1973 to Philip Jones, an artist, who demolished the servants quarters and restored the main house in 19 acres (77,000 m^{2}) of land with cottages.
