= Middle Harling Fen =

Protected area in Norfolk, England

Coordinates: 52.429°N 0.923°E

- Site of Special Scientific Interest
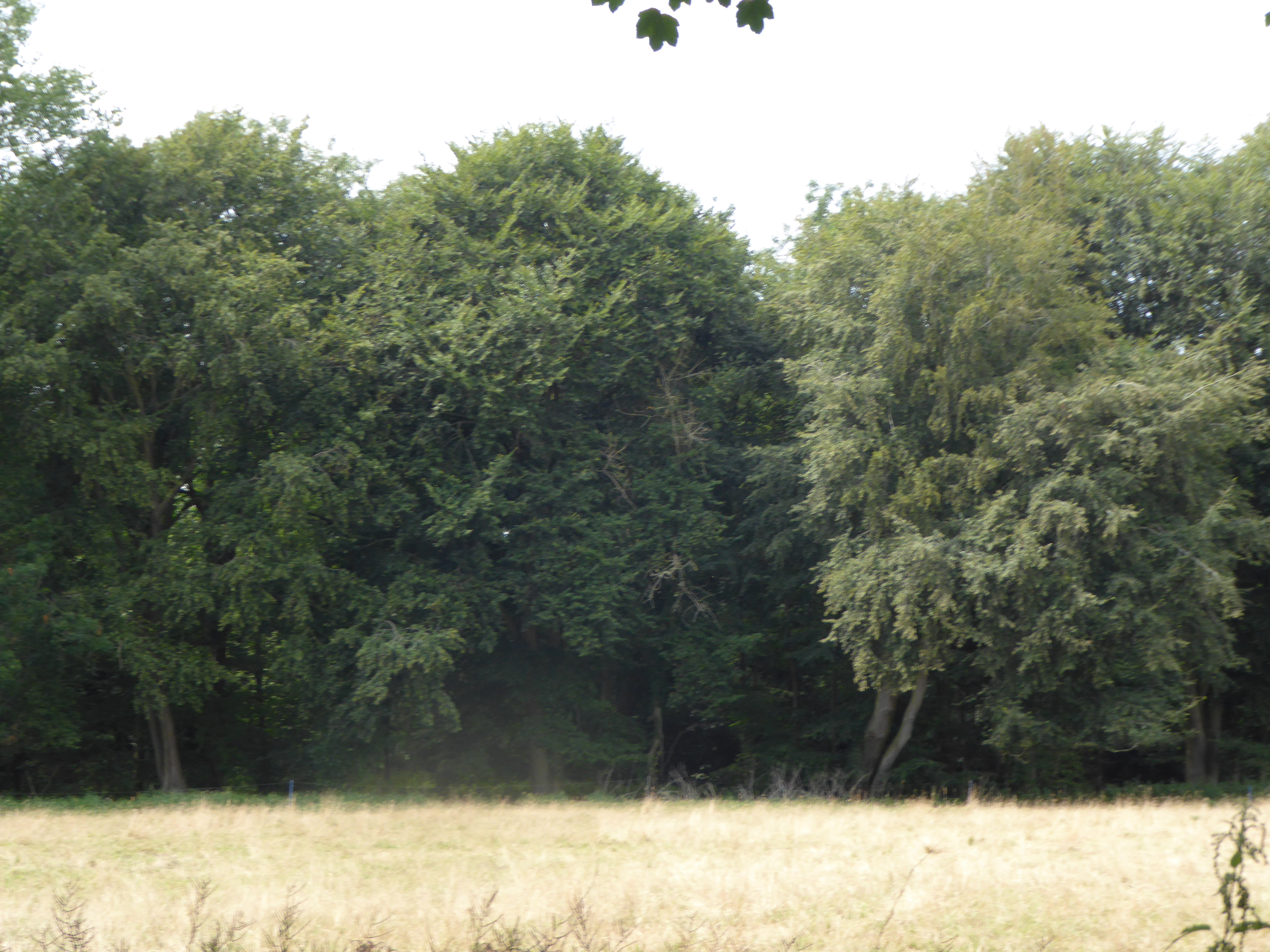
- Location of Middle Harling Fen.
- Area of search: Norfolk
- Grid reference: TL 988 852
- Interest: Biological
- Area: 11.8 hectares (29 acres)
- Notification date: 1986
- Location map: Magic Map

Middle Harling Fen is a 11.8-hectare (29-acre) biological Site of Special Scientific Interest south of East Harling in Norfolk, England.

This calcareous valley fen has several springs and a wide variety of types of grassland, including both wet and dry communities. There are uncommon flora such as adder's tongue and yellow rattle, and the breeding birds are diverse.

The site is private land with no public access.
