= Hoe, Norfolk =

Village in Norfolk, England

Coordinates: 52.71222°N 0.95225°E

Hoe
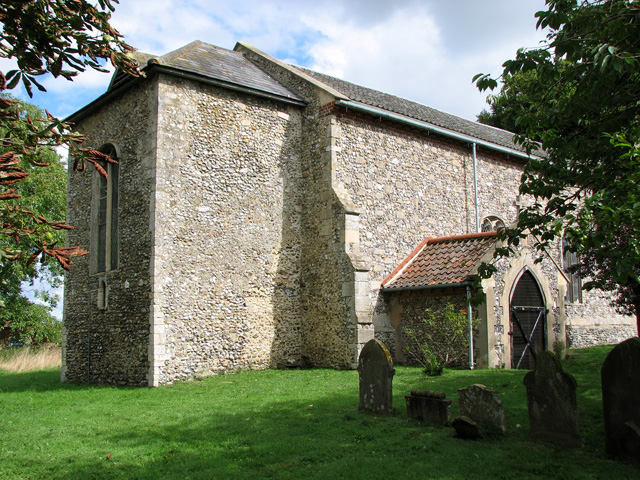
- St Andrew's Church

- Location within Norfolk
- OS grid reference: TF9952116818
- Civil parish: Hoe and Worthing
- District: Breckland
- Shire county: Norfolk
- Region: East
- Country: England
- Sovereign state: United Kingdom
- Post town: Dereham
- Postcode district: NR20
- Dialling code: 01362
- Police: Norfolk
- Fire: Norfolk
- Ambulance: East of England
- UK Parliament: Mid Norfolk

Hoe is a village in the civil parish of Hoe and Worthing, in the Breckland district, in the English county of Norfolk.

Hoe is located 2.5 miles (4.0 km) north of Dereham and 16 miles (26 km) north-west of Norwich.

== History ==
Hoe's name is of Anglo-Saxon origin and derives from the Old English for hill-spur.

In the Domesday Book, Hoe is listed as a settlement of 20 households in the hundred of Laundich. In 1086, the village was part of the East Anglian estates of St. Etheldreda's Abbey.

Hoe Hall was built on the site of a medieval moated site during the Sixteenth and Eighteenth Centuries. There was previously a walled garden which was replaced by a swimming pool in the 1970s.

== St. Andrew's Church ==
Hoe's former parish church is dedicated to Saint Andrew and dates from the Thirteenth Century. St. Andrew's is located on the High Street and has been Grade II listed since 1960. The church holds regular Sunday service once a month.

== Governance ==
Hoe is part of the electoral ward of Lincoln for local elections and is part of the district of Breckland.

The village's national constituency is Mid Norfolk which has been represented by the Conservative's George Freeman MP since 2010.

On 1 April 1935 the parish of Worthing was merged with Hoe, although the ecclesiastical parishes remain separate. On 1 January 2022 the merged parish was renamed "Hoe and Worthing". In 1931 the parish (prior to the merge) had a population of 151.

== War Memorial ==
Hoe's war memorials are a set of brass plaques inside St. Andrew's Church which lists the following name for the First World War:

Rank	Name	Unit	Date of death	Burial/Commemoration
Lt.	George B. Bagnall	6th Bn., Rifle Brigade	23 Apr. 1917	Arras Memorial

The following names were added after the Second World War:

Rank	Name	Unit	Date of death	Burial/Commemoration
PO	James A. Barclay	No. 18 Squadron RAF (Blenheims)	8 Dec. 1941	Runnymede Memorial
Pte.	Allured J. Taylor	5th Bn., Royal Norfolk Regiment	24 Jan. 1942	Kranji War Cemetery
