= Whinburgh and Westfield =

Civil parish in Norfolk, England

Coordinates: 52.645°N 0.955°E

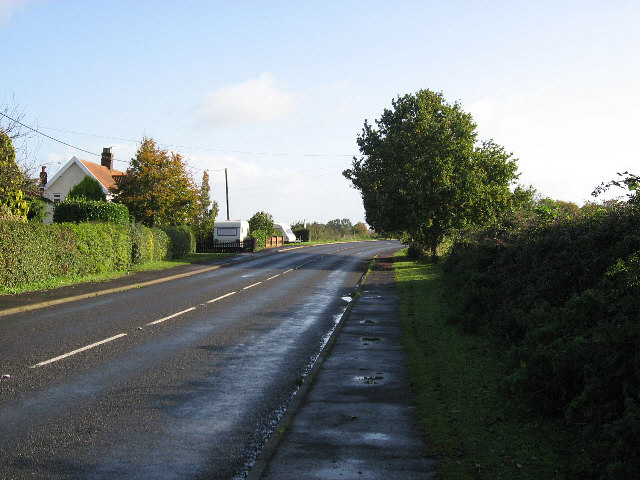
- The road to Whinburgh from Garvestone, the B1135 or Dereham Road

- Location within Norfolk
- Population: 390 (2021)
- OS grid reference: TG000094
- Civil parish: Whinburgh and Westfield
- District: Breckland
- Shire county: Norfolk
- Region: East
- Country: England
- Sovereign state: United Kingdom
- Post town: DEREHAM
- Postcode district: NR19
- Police: Norfolk
- Fire: Norfolk
- Ambulance: East of England
- Website: Parish Council

Whinburgh and Westfield is a civil parish in the English county of Norfolk. Its settlements are the small villages of Whinburgh and Westfield. For the purposes of local government, it falls within the district of Breckland. The civil parish lies to the south of the town of Dereham; Whinburgh village is about 3 miles (5 km) from the centre of the town. The parish population at the 2021 census was 390.

== History ==
The civil parish is formed from the two ancient parishes which centred round the churches of St Mary's Whinburgh and St Andrew's Westfield, and until 1894 the churches performed all the functions of local government. The County of Norfolk Review Order, 1935, sought to rationalise this, and under this Westfield parish was abolished and merged with Whinburgh parish; the name of the resultant parish was not changed from Whinburgh. In August 1995, at the request of the Parish Council, Breckland Council sealed a 'Notice of the Change of Parish Name' and the parish then became Whinburgh and Westfield.

== Toponymy ==
The name 'Whinburgh' means 'Gorse hill'.

The name 'Westfield' means 'west open land'.

== Geography ==
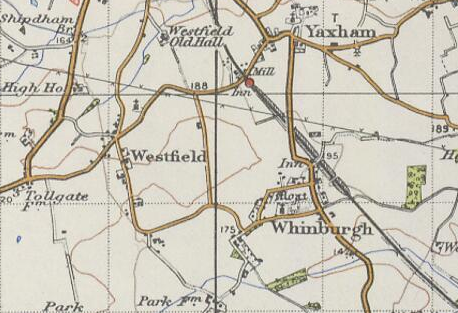
Ordnance Survey map of Whinburgh and Westfield from 1946

Whinburgh and Westfield civil parish is approximately 91 miles north east of central London, 14 miles west of central Norwich, 41 miles north of central Ipswich and 47 miles north east of central Cambridge. It is around 14 miles from the nearest coastline and 57 metres above sea level.

To the left is a picture of a historical map from 1946 showing Whinburgh and Westfield's relative location to surrounding villages. The map shows a railway line running through the parish, as well as minor country roads. The nearby village Yaxham is also on the map and the small black boxes and squares along the roads show houses and land that has been built on. The lack of built-up area on the map shows that it is not a densely populated area.

== Population ==
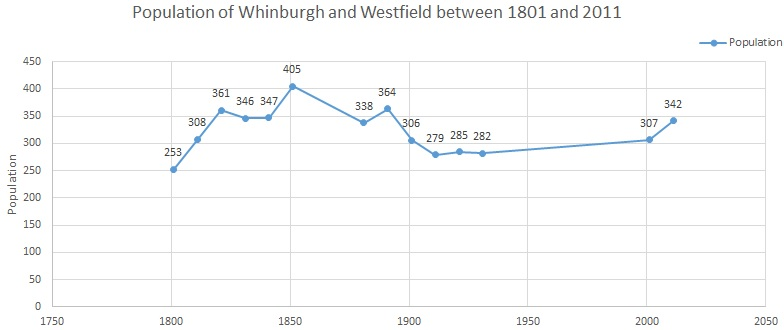
Total population supplied by neighbourhood statistics and vision of Britain

The population of Whinburgh and Westfield has increased and declined at periods throughout recent history. As Whinburgh and Westfield were two separate parishes until 1935, two sources were used to create the population structure line graph. The first census data from 1801 recorded a population of 253 which is 91 less than 342 the population according to the 2011 census. There was a peak in population in 1851 with 405 people living in Whinburgh and Westfield. This number decreased to 279 however by the 1911 census, this could be down to migration to more metropolitan areas during the peak of the industrial revolution with people in search for work and money and improved standard of living. With the large cities of Norwich, Cambridge and Ipswich within a 50-mile radius and London a 100-mile radius these could have been the destinations where people moved to. As well as job seeking, illness and old age are factors to account for a lower population.

== Housing ==
In the 1870s, Whinburgh was described as:

"Acres, 1,241. Real property, £2,090. Pop., 220. Houses, 49. The manor belongs to Mrs. Grigson."

This observation made in 1887 counts for 220 people living in 49 houses in an area of 1241 acres meaning an average of around 5 persons in each household. This is very different to the average persons per household data from the 2011 census which states a total 150 dwellings for a population of 342 giving an average of just over 2 persons per household.

== Employment ==
Occupation structure of the 157 working population in Whinburgh and Westfield in 1881. Information retrieved from the Vision of Britain website.

Employment figures from the 1881 census for Whinburgh and Westfield show a large percentage of the population were working in agriculture or to have an unknown occupation. Mainly it was men that worked in agriculture as farmers and people with an unknown occupation happened to be all female according to the census data on the Vision of Britain website. Other occupations included work in domestic services such as maids and housekeepers and individuals using skilled labour for their craft like carpenters and blacksmiths.

== Churches ==
The ecclesiastical parishes of Whinburgh and Westfield were united in 1733, and since 1938 have been held in plurality with Reymerston.

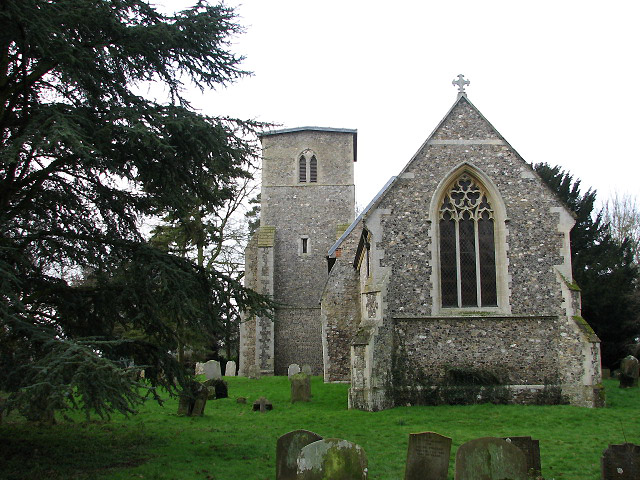
St Mary's Church, Whinburgh

=== St Mary's, Whinburgh ===
St Mary's Church was built around 1300, though some traces of older work survive. The chancel was mostly rebuilt in 1889, although there is one surviving 16th century window and some 17th/18th century woodwork. St Mary's Church is on Church Road in the heart of Whinburgh.

The Rectory, rebuilt in the 1860s, was sold in 1981.

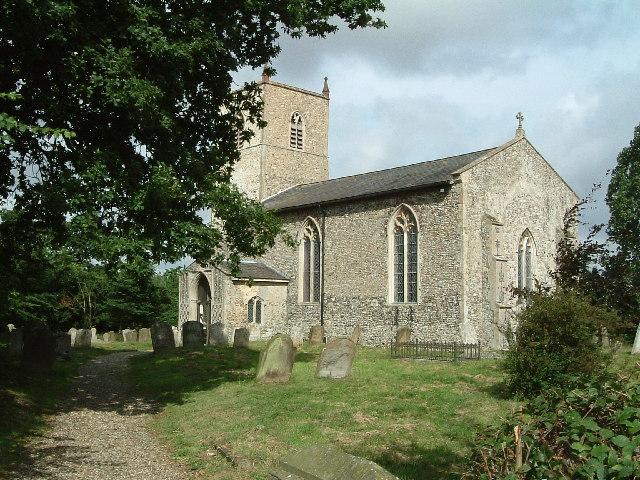
St Andrew's Westfield

=== St Andrew's, Westfield ===
St Andrew's Church has an early 14th-century west tower. There is also a 15th-century porch with some Flushwork and the nave retains the tracery window which would have originally been part of the chancel, which was demolished around 1700.

== Whinburgh Music Festival ==
In 2012 the chancel roof at St Mary's Whinburgh was in need of urgent repairs and funds were needed to supplement an English Heritage grant so the Whinburgh Music Festival was born to help find the money for the repairs. From its early days it has grown, its reputation flourished and is now firmly established in the local music event calendar. Funds are still raised for the church and a willing band of volunteers help run the festival.

The 2015 festival had a mixed programme with a barn dance on the Friday night, cello concert on Saturday and a classical concert of Vivaldi's Gloria and Mozart Requiem on Sunday taking place between 7 and 9 August.

The fifth Whinburgh Music Festival took place on the 30 and 31 July 2016 and saw the festival turn its attention to the joys of jazz and classical music.
