= Sea Mere, Hingham =

UK Site of Special Scientific Interest

Coordinates: 52.570°N 1.001°E

- Site of Special Scientific Interest
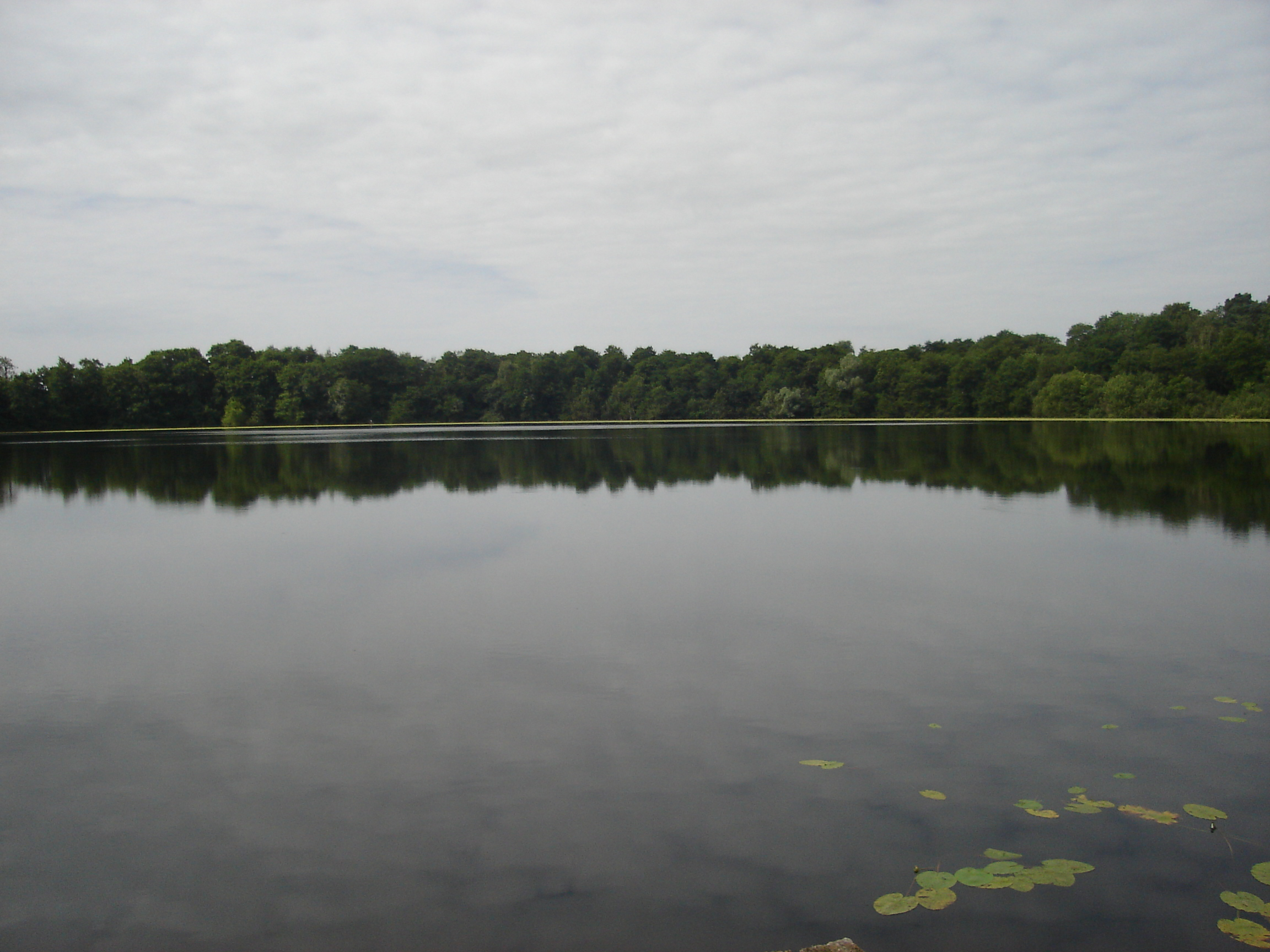
- Location of Sea Mere, Hingham.
- Area of search: Norfolk
- Grid reference: TG 035 011
- Interest: Biological
- Area: 36.3 hectares (90 acres)
- Notification date: 1985
- Location map: Magic Map

Sea Mere, Hingham is a 36.3-hectare (90-acre) biological Site of Special Scientific Interest close to the town of Hingham in Norfolk, England.

The site has a natural circular kettle hole mere which was formed during the Holocene period approximately 10,000 years ago and covers 20 acres (8.1 ha) together with areas of fen, grazing marsh and woodland. The fen has a rich variety of flora including saw sedge, marsh pennywort, yellow loosestrife, yellow iris and the rare green figwort.
