= Bell Hotel, Thetford =

Hotel in Thetford, Norfolk, England

Bell Hotel
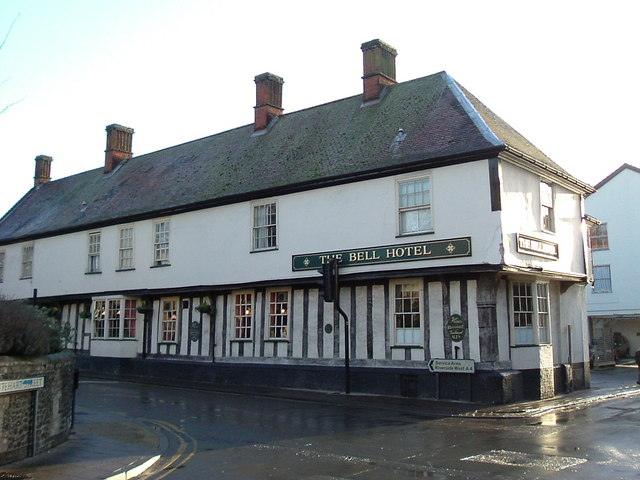

- Norfolk

General information
- Location: Thetford, Breckland, Norfolk, England, King Street; Thetford; Norfolk; IP24 2AZ; United Kingdom
- Coordinates: 52°24′51.14″N 0°44′47.91″E
- Opening: 1493 (First documented)

Technical details
- Floor count: 3

Other information
- Number of rooms: 46 en-suite bedrooms
- Number of restaurants: 1
- Parking: Yes but limited

Website
- Hotel Website

Listed Building – Grade II*
- Designated: 3 April 1951
- Reference no.: 1195935

The Bell Hotel is an AA 3-star hotel in the English town of Thetford within the county of Norfolk. The hotel has been a Grade II* listed building since 3 April 1951.

== Location ==
The hotel is located on the corner of King Street and Bridge Street in the centre of Thetford. The hotel is 0.5 miles (0.80 km) south of Thetford railway station. The hotel is 29.8 miles (48.0 km) south-west of the city of Norwich. The nearest airport is also at Norwich and that is 32.4 miles (52.1 km) north-east of the hotel.

== History ==
Documentation shows that there has been an Inn on this site since 1493. The premises served as a principal coaching inn on the London to Norwich mail coach route. The two storey timber framed building which faces on to King street is the oldest part of the present building. With the arrival of the railway connections to Thetford, Norwich and wider Norfolk the inn then was turned into a hotel. In the 17th century and 19th century further wings and extensions have been added with the west wing constructed in the late 20th century. The hotel is reputedly haunted by the ghost of its 18th-century landlady Betty Radcliffe. Actors associated with the BBC comedy show Dad's Army, stayed at the hotel when filming on location.
