= Quidenham =

Village in Norfolk, England

Coordinates: 52.45054°N 0.98150°E

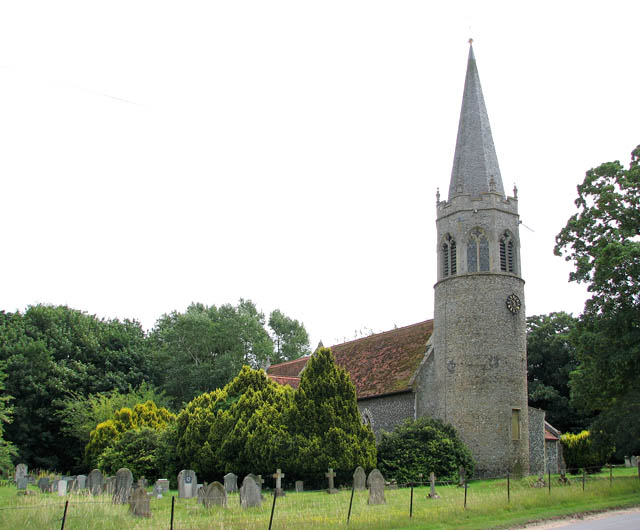
- Quidenham St Andrew

- Location within Norfolk
- Area: 22.51 km^{2} (8.69 sq mi)
- Population: 560 (2011)
  - Density: 25/km^{2} (65/sq mi)
- OS grid reference: TM 027 878
- Civil parish: Quidenham
- District: Breckland
- Shire county: Norfolk
- Region: East
- Country: England
- Sovereign state: United Kingdom
- Post town: NORWICH
- Postcode district: NR16
- Dialling code: 01953
- Police: Norfolk
- Fire: Norfolk
- Ambulance: East of England
- UK Parliament: Mid Norfolk

Quidenham is a village and civil parish in the Breckland district, in the county of Norfolk, England. The parish includes the village of Wilby and the hamlet of Eccles Road. The parish covers an area of 22.51 km^{2} (8.69 sq mi) and had a population of 576 in 183 households at the 2001 census, falling to a population of 560 living in 189 households at the 2011 Census.

It is situated 10 miles (16 km) north-east of the town of Thetford and 24 miles (39 km) south-west of the city of Norwich.

Quidenham Hall is now a monastery of Carmelite nuns. A hospice for sick children occupies the site of some former staff cottages on the property. It is run independently of the monastery under the management of the East Anglian Children's Hospices (EACH), a registered charity under the patronage of the Princess of Wales.

The church of St Andrew is one of 124 existing round-tower churches in Norfolk. The church has a commemorative altar in the south aisle with a memorial window for the 96th Bombardment Group, which was based at nearby RAF Snetterton Heath from June 1943 to November 1945.

Quidenham was the location of the music festival Play Fest, which ran for two years from 2011 until 2013.

Snetterton Motor Racing Circuit is partially located in Quidenham parish, albeit 2 miles (3.2 km) to the north-west of the village. Eccles Road railway station, on the Breckland Line between Cambridge and Norwich, is a similar distance to the north of the village.

== History ==
The placename "Quidenham" is first attested in the Domesday Book of 1086, where it appears as "Cuidenham", and means "Cwida's ham or village". The name "Cwida" corresponds to the Old High German name "Quito".

There is a local tradition that Queen Boudica or Boadicea is buried in Quidenham.

On 1 April 1935 the parish of "Quidenham" was abolished and merged with Eccles, the parishes of Hargham and Wilby were also merged with Eccles at the same time. At the 1931 census (the last before the abolition of the parish), Quidenham had a population of 125. On 16 May 1956 Eccles parish was renamed to "Quidenham". In 1974 it became part of the non-metropolitan district of Breckland.
