= Kenninghall and Banham Fens with Quidenham Mere =

Protected area in Norfolk, England

Coordinates: 52.448°N 1.000°E

- Site of Special Scientific Interest
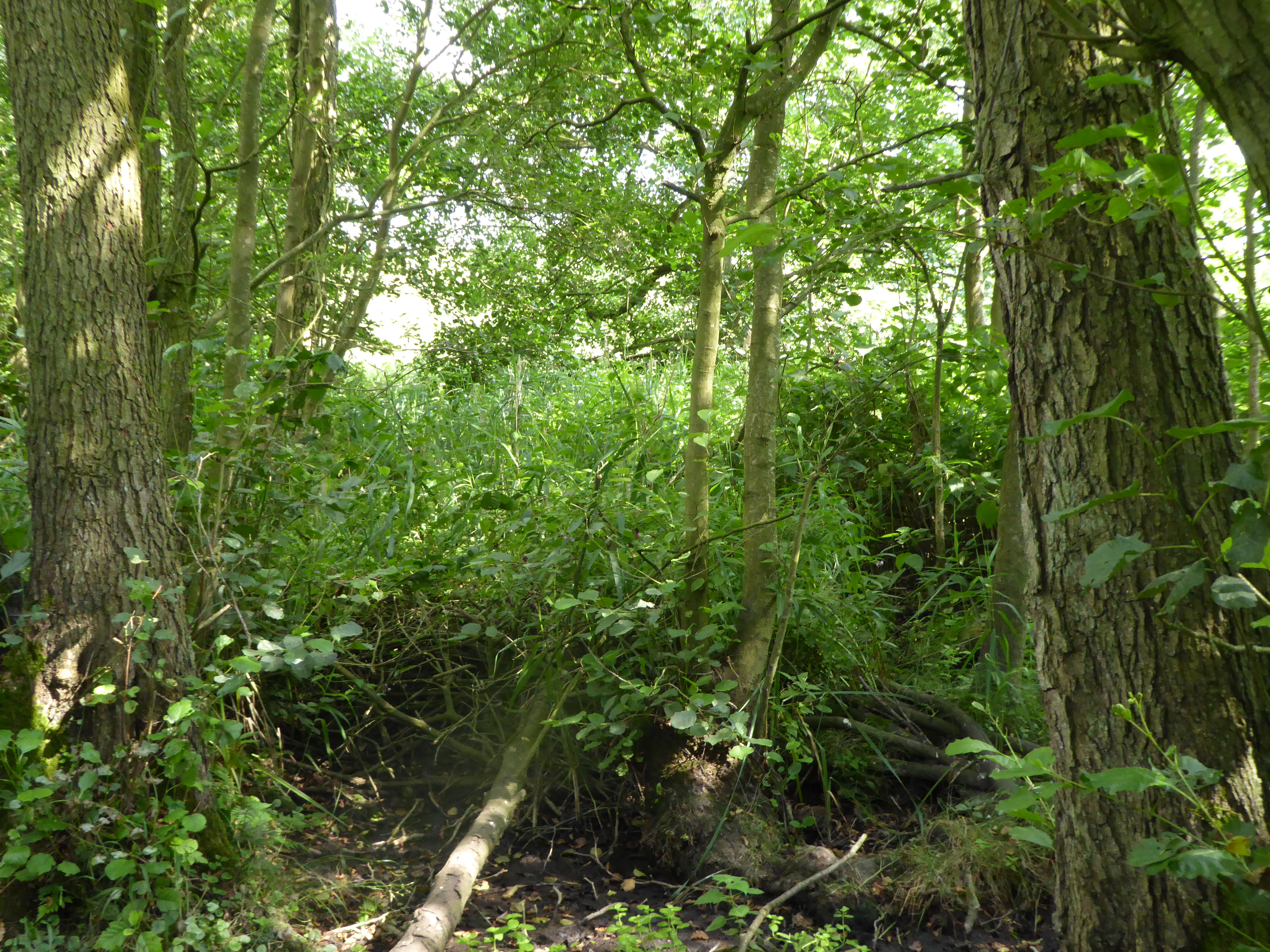
- Location of Kenninghall and Banham Fens with Quidenham Mere.
- Area of search: Norfolk
- Grid reference: TM 040 876
- Interest: Biological
- Area: 48.4 hectares (120 acres)
- Notification date: 1985
- Location map: Magic Map

Kenninghall and Banham Fens with Quidenham Mere is a 48.4-hectare (120-acre) biological Site of Special Scientific Interest west of Banham, in Norfolk, England.

This site in the valley of the River Whittle has a lake, tall fen, wet woodland and calcareous grassland. Springs feed an area of fen grassland dominated by purple moor grass, blunt-flowered rush and black bog-rush.

The site is private land with no public access.
