= Wilby, Norfolk =

Village in Norfolk, England

Coordinates: 52°28′08″N 0°59′27″E

Wilby
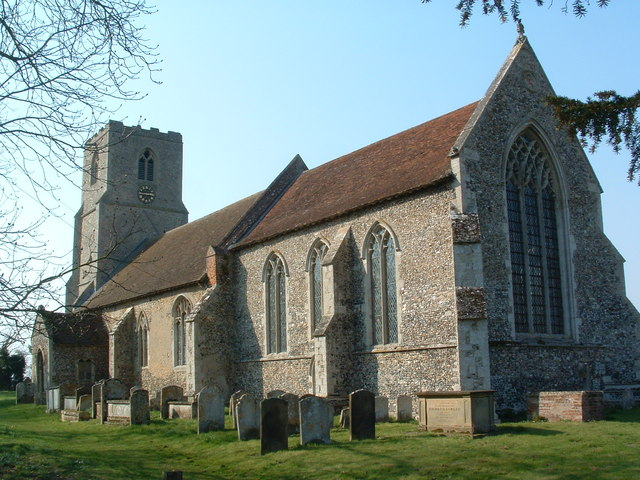
- All Saints’ Church, Wilby

- Location within Norfolk
- Civil parish: Quidenham
- District: Breckland
- Shire county: Norfolk
- Region: East
- Country: England
- Sovereign state: United Kingdom
- Post town: NORWICH
- Postcode district: NR16
- Police: Norfolk
- Fire: Norfolk
- Ambulance: East of England

Wilby is a village in the civil parish of Quidenham, in the Breckland district, in the county of Norfolk, England. It is 17 miles (27 km) south-west of Norwich.

== History ==
The name "Wilby" means 'Willow-tree farm/settlement' or 'willow-tree circle'. There are earthworks of Wilby Deserted medieval village and there is evidence of Saxon occupation. Wilby was recorded in the Domesday Book of 1086 as Wilebey/Wilgeby/Willebeih. On 1 April 1935 the parish was abolished and merged with Eccles which was renamed to Quidenham in 1956. In 1931 the parish had a population of 94. Wilby has a church called All Saints. Wilby Hall, a country house is north of the village.
