= Old Buckenham Windmill =

Windmill in Old Buckenham, Norfolk, England

Old Buckenham Mill
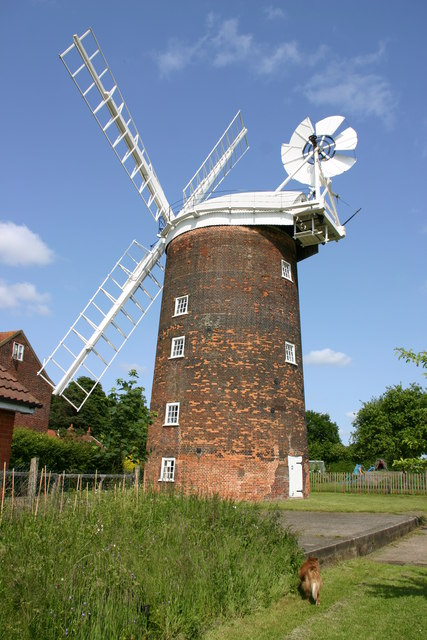
- Old Buckenham Windmill
- Interactive map of Old Buckenham Mill

Origin
- Mill location: Old Buckenham, Breckland, Norfolk
- Coordinates: 52.4778°N 1.0354°E
- Year built: 1818

Information
- Purpose: Flour mill
- Type: Tower mill
- Storeys: Five
- No. of sails: Four
- Type of sails: Patent-Shutter
- Other information

Listed Building – Grade II*
- Designated: 21 July 1951
- Reference no.: 1342467
- Current Status: static
- Website: http://www.banhamandthebucks.co.uk/windmill/

Old Buckenham Windmill is a tower flour mill which stands in the village of Old Buckenham, Norfolk, England. It is a Grade II* listed building, notable for being the largest diameter windmill in the country.

The tower was built in 1818 of brick in five storeys and is 8 meters (26.5 feet) in diameter at the base. The cap was boat shaped and extended to the rear. At 7.3 meters (24 feet) in diameter, it was the largest known cap in the country, requiring five truck wheels and 17 centring wheels to carry the weight. Originally fitted with eight plain sails, it was converted to use four patent sails. There were five pairs of French stones on the second floor but milling at the mill ceased in 1926 and the stones were broken up.

The mill was originally built for John Burlingham, who was also the miller at a local postmill. During its working life, it was owned by Jeremiah James Colman, of Colman's Mustard, and later by Prince Frederick Duleep Singh, who lived in Old Buckenham Hall at the end of the 19th century. It is now the property of the Norfolk Windmills Trust, who are in the process of restoring it to its original condition.

The mill is owned by Norfolk County Council, and operated on their behalf by the Norfolk Windmills Trust. A local village charity, the Friends of Old Buckenham Windmill, fundraises to support restoration and opens the mill to the public.

The mill is open to the public on regularly published dates from May to October, details of which can be found on the mill's facebook page.
