= List of shipwrecks in November 1825 =

The list of shipwrecks in November 1825 includes some ships sunk, wrecked or otherwise lost during November 1825.

== 1 November ==
List of shipwrecks: 1 November 1825
Ship	State	Description
Abdero	(United Kingdom of Great Britain and Ireland) Jamaica	The ship was wrecked on the coast of Cuba in a hurricane.
Betsey	United Kingdom	The ship was lost off Terschelling, Friesland, Netherlands. She was on a voyage from London to Bremen.
Bittern	United Kingdom	The ship was driven ashore and wrecked in the Pentland Firth. Her crew were rescued. She was on a voyage from Yarmouth, Nova Scotia, British North America to Sunderland, County Durham.
Carolina	United Kingdom	The schooner capsized and sank off Cuba in a hurricane. She was later refloated.
Catharine	United Kingdom	The ship was druveb asgire at Memel, Prussia.
Comet	United Kingdom	The ship was driven ashore on the coast of Jutland. Her crew were rescued. She was on a voyage from London to Fredrikstad, Norway.
Despatch	Spain	The schooner was lost at Roco, Cuba in a hurricane.
Fame	United Kingdom	The ship foundered off Cape St. Vincent, Portugal. Her crew were rescued by a Russian vessel. She was on a voyage from Faro, Portugal to London.
Lucretia	United Kingdom	The ship was abandonedin the Atlantic Ocean. Her crew were rescued by Thames (United Kingdom). Lucretia was on a voyage from Pictou, Nova Scotia, British North America to Belfast, County Antrim.
Lucy	United Kingdom	The brig capsized off Cuba in a hurricane.
Pilot	United States	The brig foundered off Cuba in a hurricane.
Providence	United Kingdom	The ship was driven ashore on "Casnore Point". All on board were rescued. She was on a voyage from Dublin to Cork.
Star	Royal Navy	The cutter, a tender to HMS Investigator (Royal Navy) was abandoned in the North Sea. Her eight crew were rescued by Amity (United Kingdom).
Vrow Elsina	Netherlands	The ship was driven ashore and wrecked on Terschelling. Her crew were rescued. She was on a voyage from Amsterdam, North Holland to Hull, Yorkshire, United Kingdom.

== 2 November ==
List of shipwrecks: 2 November 1825
Ship	State	Description
Clio	United States	The ship was wrecked on the south coast of Nantucket, Massachusetts.
Henry Grattan	United Kingdom	The ship was driven ashore at Padstow, Cornwall.
London Packet	United Kingdom	The ship was driven ashore at Wells-next-the-Sea, Norfolk. Her crew were rescued. She was on a voyage from London to Glasgow, Renfrewshire. London Packet was wrecked on 10 November.
Lucinda	United Kingdom	The ship was abandoned in the North Sea with the loss of a crew member. She was on a voyage from Memel, Prussia to London.
Memnon	United Kingdom	The ship capsized in the River Tyne at North Shields, County Durham. Her crew survived. She was refloated on 7 November and taken in to North Shields.
Nile	United Kingdom	The brig was driven ashore and wrecked at Boulogne, Pas-de-Calais, France. Her crew were rescued. She was on a voyage from Tenerife, Spain to London.
Union	United Kingdom	The ship struck a reef and foundered off Wexford. Her crew were rescued. She was on a voyage from Ayr to Waterford.

== 3 November ==
List of shipwrecks: 3 November 1825
Ship	State	Description
Ariadne	Denmark	The ship was abandoned in the English Channel off Ramsgate, Kent, United Kingdom. She was on a voyage from Portsmouth, Hampshire to London, United Kingdom. Ariadne was subsequently taken in to Gravelines, Nord by a French fishing boat.
Asia	United Kingdom	The ship ran aground and was damaged at Saaremaa, Russia. She was on a voyage from Riga, Russia to Portsmouth, Hampshire. She was later taken in to Kuressaare, Russia and then Copenhagen, Denmark, where she arrived on 26 August 1826 in a waterlogged condition.
Bambro' Castle	United Kingdom	The ship was driven ashore at Bamburgh, Northumberland. Her crew were rescued.
Betsey	United Kingdom	The ship was driven ashore and wrecked at Bamburgh. Her crew were rescued.
Britannia	United Kingdom	The ship was driven ashore and wrecked at Tarbert, Ayrshire.
Cassiope	United Kingdom	The ship was driven ashore and damaged at Sunderland, County Durham. Her crew were rescued. She was refloated on 8 November and taken in to Sunderland.
Catherine	United Kingdom	The ship was driven ashore at Tarbert.
Charles	United Kingdom	The ship was driven ashore on Eierland, North Holland, Netherlands. Her crew survived. She was on a voyage from Newhaven, Sussex to Sunderland.
Frances Ann	United Kingdom	The ship ran aground on the Corton Sand, in the North Sea off Lowestoft, Suffolk and was abandoned by her crew. She was on a voyage from Danzig to London. Frances Ann was refloated about a week later and towed in to Harwich, Essex in a wrecked condition.
Harmony	United Kingdom	The ship was driven ashore at Tarbert.
Jabez	United Kingdom	The ship was driven ashore at Sunderland, County Durham.
John Guise	United Kingdom	The brig ran aground and sank in the Bristol Channel off Hubberston, Pembrokeshire. She was on a voyage from Newport, Monmouthshire to Cork. John Guise was refloated on 11 November and taken in to Hubberston for repairs.
Lady Hannah Ellice	United Kingdom	The ship was driven into other vessels and then driven ashore at Milford Haven. She was on a voyage from Alexandria, Egypt to London.
Liverpool	United Kingdom	The ship was driven ashore and wrecked near Tarbert.
Mary Anne	United Kingdom	The ship departed from Halifax, Nova Scotia, British North America for Nevis. No further trace, presumed foundered with the loss of all hands.
Neptune	United Kingdom	The ship ran aground on the Herd Sand, in the North Sea off the coast of County Durham. All on board were rescued by the North Shields Lifeboat. Neptune was on a voyage from Arbroath, Ayrshire to Newcastle upon Tyne, Northumberland.
New Braganza	United Kingdom	The ship was driven ashore and wrecked at Padstow, Cornwall. She was on a voyage from Dublin to London.
Northumberland	United Kingdom	The brig was wrecked off Harwich, Essex. Her crew were rescued by Caledonia (United Kingdom). Northumberland was on a voyage from Sunderland, County Durham to London.
Ogle Castle	United Kingdom	The East Indiaman was wrecked on the Goodwin Sands, Kent with the loss of over 100 lives. Seventeen of her crew were rescued by a French fishing boat. She was on a voyage from Bombay, India to London.
Rachel	United Kingdom	The ship was driven ashore at Bamburgh. Her crew were rescued.
Reliance	United Kingdom	The ship was driven ashore at Tarbert.
Royal Yeoman	United Kingdom	The ship was beached at North Shields. She was refloated on 7 November.
Spring Flower	United Kingdom	The ship was driven ashore and wrecked at Padstow with the loss of all hands. She was on a voyage from Memel, Prussia to Milford Haven, Pembrokeshire.
Susan and Ann	Prussia	The ship was wrecked on the Sandhammer Reef with the loss of a crew member.
True Blue	United Kingdom	The ship was driven ashore at Tarbert. She was later refloated and taken in to Limerick for repairs.
Vryheid & Wrade	Netherlands	The ship was driven ashore at Ambleteuse, Pas-de-Calais, France. She was on a voyage from Le Havre, Seine-Inférieure, France to Antwerp.
William Pitt	United Kingdom	The ship was driven ashore at Milford Haven.

== 4 November ==
List of shipwrecks: 4 November 1825
Ship	State	Description
Ann	Hamburg	The ship was wrecked on the Coach Reef. She was on a voyage from Havana, Cuba to Hamburg.
Roberts	United Kingdom	The ship was driven ashore in the Bay of Quick. She was on a voyage from Glasgow, Renfrewshire to Belfast, County Antrim. She was refloated on 7 November.
Robinson Potter	United Kingdom	The ship was driven ashore at "Rammekins Castle", Zeeland, Netherlands.
Utility	United Kingdom	The ship was wrecked on the Sunk Sand, in the North Sea off the coast of Essex. Her crew and passenger survived.

== 5 November ==
List of shipwrecks: 5 November 1825
Ship	State	Description
Active	United Kingdom	The ship was driven ashore at Thornham, Norfolk. She was on a voyage from London to King's Lynn, Norfolk.
Brevig	Norway	The ship was driven ashore and wrecked on "Aroesholmen".
Dover	United Kingdom	The ship was driven ashore and wrecked at Larvik, Norway.
Hercules	United Kingdom	The sloop sprang a leak and was beached at Arbroath, Ayrshire. She was refloated on 7 November. Hercules was on a voyage from Glasgow, Renfrewshire to Arbroath.
London	United Kingdom	The ship sank at Dublin. Her crew were rescued.
Providence Goodintent	United Kingdom	The ship was driven ashore at Tönningen, Duchy of Holstein. She was on a voyage from Tönningen to Hull, Yorkshire.

== 6 November ==
List of shipwrecks: 6 November 1825
Ship	State	Description
Albion	United Kingdom	The ship was driven ashore and wrecked in Beyhouse Bay. Her crew were rescued. She was on a voyage from Wick, Caithness to Newry, County Antrim.
Batre Tider	Sweden	The ship was wrecked near "Leming", Jutland with the loss of two of her crew. She was on a voyage from Hamburg to Stockholm.
Donna Maria	Norway	The ship foundered in the Atlantic Ocean. Her seven crew were rescued by Hope (United Kingdom). She was on a voyage from Trondheim to Barcelona, Spain.
Farmer	United Kingdom	The ship was driven ashore and wrecked on Saaremaa, Russia. She was on a voyage from Saint Petersburg, Russia to Belfast, County Antrim.
Lord Musgrove	United Kingdom	The ship departed from Gravesend, Kent for Antwerp, Netherlands. No further trace, presumed foundered with the loss of all hands.
Mary	United Kingdom	The ship was wrecked on the Mossy Weights, near Wexford. Her crew were rescued. She was on a voyage from Staxigoe, Caithness to Wexford.
Meanwell	United Kingdom	The brig was driven ashore at Marstrand, Sweden.
Plodvad	Flag unknown	The ship was wrecked near "Falkenburg" with the loss of two of her crew.
Susan	United Kingdom	The brig was wrecked on Walney Island, Lancashire with the loss of all hands. She was on a voyage from Liverpool, Lancashire to Whitehaven, Cumberland.

== 7 November ==
List of shipwrecks: 7 November 1825
Ship	State	Description
Apparancen	Sweden	The ship foundered in the Atlantic Ocean 10 nautical miles (19 km) west of Faro, Portugal with the loss of two of her twelve crew. She was on a voyage from Torrevecchia Teatina, Kingdom of the Two Sicilies to Gothenburg.
Crawford	United States	The ship ran aground on the Bahama Banks. She was refloated and taken in to Nassau, Bahamas where she was declared a constructive total loss. Crawford was on a voyage from New York to New Orleans, Louisiana.
Equity	United Kingdom	The ship was driven ashore at Blakeney, Norfolk.
Georginia	United Kingdom	The smack was wrecked at Margate, Kent. Her crew were rescued. She was on a voyage from Dover to Dartford.
Industry	United Kingdom	The ship was lost near Marstrand, Sweden. She was on a voyage from Danzig to London.
Louise	France	The sloop was driven ashore and wrecked at Boulogne, Pas-de-Calais. Her crew were rescued.
Mary	United Kingdom	The ship was wrecked at Formentera, Balearic Islands, Spain. Her crew were rescued. She was on a voyage from Gibraltar to Salou, Spain.
Pitt	United Kingdom	The ship was lost near Stromstad, Sweden with the loss of four of her crew. She was on a voyage from Memel, Prussia to Grangemouth, Stirlingshire.
Rostopchin	Prussia	The ship was driven ashore and wrecked at Nida, Russia. Her crew were rescued. She was on a voyage from London to Pillau.

== 8 November ==
List of shipwrecks: 8 November 1825
Ship	State	Description
Abeona	United Kingdom	The ship was driven ashore and wrecked at Birling Gap, Sussex. All on board were rescued. She was on a voyage from Málaga, Spain to London.
Advina	United Kingdom	The ship was driven ashore and damaged at Sunderland, County Durham. She was refloated on 21 November and taken in to Sunderland.
Ant	United Kingdom	The ship was wrecked at Wrango, Sweden with the loss of three of her crew.
Dove	United Kingdom	The ship was driven ashore and severely damaged at Sunderland. She was refloated on 24 November and taken in to Sunderland.
Emma	Stettin	The ship was driven ashore and wrecked on Saaremaa, Russia. She was on a voyage from Saint Petersburg, Russia to Stettin.
Friends	United Kingdom	The pilot cutter foundered in Swansea Bay with the loss of three lives.
George Canning	United Kingdom	The ship was driven ashore near Wrango. She was refloated in mid-December and taken in to Gothenburg, Sweden.
HMS Investigator	Royal Navy	The sloop was wrecked in the North Sea. She reached Harwich, Essex on 11 November.
Mary	United Kingdom	The ship was driven ashore and wrecked at Sunderland.
Princess Elizabeth	United Kingdom	The ship ran aground on the Sunk Sand, in the Humber. She was on a voyage from Smyrna, Ottoman Empire to Grimsby, Lincolnshire. Princess Elizabeth was later refloated and taken in to Grimsby.
Transfer	United Kingdom	The ship was wrecked on Scroby Sands, Norfolk. with the loss of all hands. She was on a voyage from South Shields, County Durham to London.
Traveller	United Kingdom	The ship was driven ashore and wrecked at Orford, Suffolk with the loss of eight of her twelve crew. She was on a voyage from North Shields, County Durham to London.

== 9 November ==
List of shipwrecks: 9 November 1825
Ship	State	Description
Alnwick Packet	United Kingdom	The ship foundered in the North Sea off Runton, Norfolk. Her crew were rescued. She was on a voyage from London to Alnwick, Northumberland.
Anna Regina	Stettin	The ship was lost near "Rammekins Castle", Zeeland, Netherlands. Her crew were rescued She was on a voyage from Antwerp to Stettin.
Concordia	Sweden	The ship was wrecked near Helsingør, Denmark. Her crew were rescued.
Goodintention	United Kingdom	The ship was driven ashore at Penarth, Glamorgan. She was refloated the next day.
Governor Strong	United States	The ship was driven ashore between Fort St. Philip and "Punta Nala", Spain. She was on a voyage from Marseille, Bouches-du-Rhône, France to New Orleans, Louisiana.
Hope	United Kingdom	The ship ran aground and was severely damaged on the Herd Sand, in the North Sea off South Shields, County Durham. She was on a voyage from Sunderland, County Durham to Aberdeen.
Mercurius	Sweden	The ship was driven ashore and wrecked near Helsingør. Her crew were rescued.
Moderator	United Kingdom	The ship was driven ashore and sank at Penarth. She was on a voyage from Cardiff, Glamorgan to Bristol, Gloucestershire.
Petite Catharine	France	The ship was sighted off Cromer, Norfolk, United Kingdom whilst on a voyage from Dunkirk, Nord to King's Lynn, Norfolk. No further trace, presumed foundered in the North Sea with the loss of all hands.
Ponsonby	United Kingdom	The ship foundered off The Mumbles, Glamorgan.
Preston	United Kingdom	The ship ran aground on the Herd Sand and was severely damaged. She was on a voyage from Quebec City, Lower Canada, British North America to Leith, Lothian. Preston was refloated on 14 November and taken in to North Shields, County Durham.
Two Sisters	United Kingdom	The ship was driven ashore at Whitby, Yorkshire.
William Etherington	United Kingdom	The ship was driven ashore in Casperwick Bay. She was on a voyage from Saint Petersburg, Russia to London. She was refloated and taken in to Reval, Russia in April 1826.

== 10 November ==
List of shipwrecks: 10 November 1825
Ship	State	Description
Active	United Kingdom	The ship was driven ashore at Bridlington, Yorkshire.
Alert	United Kingdom	The ship capsized at North Shields. She was subsequently refloated.
Anson	United Kingdom	The ship was wrecked on the Hoyle Bank, in Liverpool Bay. Her crew were rescued. She was on a voyage from Wiscasset, Maine, United States to Liverpool, Lancashire.
Bee	United Kingdom	The ship was wrecked on the Hoyle Bank. Her crew were rescued. She was on a voyage from Liverpool to Demerara.
Bee	United Kingdom	The ship was driven ashore and wrecked at Ingoldmells, Lincolnshire. Her crew were rescued. She was on a voyage from London to Leeds, Yorkshire.
Caroline	United Kingdom	The ship was driven ashore near Wells-next-the-Sea, Norfolk. She was on a voyage from Wells-next-the-Sea to Leeds.
Canadienne	(United Kingdom of Great Britain and Ireland) British North America	The schooner was wrecked on the Goodwin Sands, Kent, United Kingdom. Her crew survived. She was on a voyage from Quebec City, Lower Canada to London, United Kingdom.
Clarendon	United Kingdom	The ship was driven ashore at Seacombe, Cheshire. She was on a voyage from Liverpool to Jamaica. She was later refloated.
Constitution	United Kingdom	The ship was driven ashore and wrecked in Fishguard Bay with the loss of all hands. She was on a voyage from Youghal, County Cork to Bristol, Gloucestershire.
Courier de Cayenne	France	The ship was driven ashore at Paimbœuf, Loire-Inférieure.
Cygnet	United Kingdom	The ship was driven ashore and wrecked in Swanage Bay. Her crew were rescued.
Effort	United Kingdom	The ship was driven ashore and severely damaged at Weymouth, Dorset.
Fame	United Kingdom	The ship was driven ashore and wrecked at Blakeney, Norfolk. Her crew were rescued.
Flanders	United Kingdom	The ship was driven ashore and wrecked at Bridlington.
HMRC Fly	Board of Customs	The cutter was driven ashore crewless at Sutton Wash, Lincolnshire.
HMRC Fox	Board of Customs	The cutter was driven ashore in Swanage Bay.
Fox	United Kingdom	The ship was driven ashore on the Isle of Portland, Dorset.
Friends	United Kingdom	The ship was driven ashore and wrecked in Swanage Bay. Her crew were rescued.
George and Elizabeth	United Kingdom	The ship was driven ashore and wrecked at Wells-next-the-Sea, Norfolk.
Goede Hoepe	Netherlands	The ship was beached on Heligoland. She was on a voyage from London, United Kingdom to Amsterdam, North Holland.
Greyhound	United Kingdom	The ship was driven ashore on the Isle of Portland.
Halifax	United Kingdom	The ship was driven ashore and wrecked at Ingdolmells. Her crew were rescued. She was on a voyage from London to Leeds.
Hannah	United Kingdom	The ship was driven ashore at Wells-next-the-Sea.
Hersilia	France	The ship struck a rock and foundered off Sisal, Yucatán, Mexico. Her crew were rescued. She was on a voyage from Marseille, Bouches-du-Rhône to Alvarado, Veracruz, Mexico.
Heart of Oak	United Kingdom	The ship was run down and sunk in the River Mersey.
Heureuse Claire	France	The ship was driven ashore and wrecked at Point Pharos, Bouches-du-Rhône.
Hinchinbrook	United Kingdom	The ship was driven ashore on the Isle of Portland. She was later refloated.
Hoopoe	United Kingdom	The ship was driven ashore. She was on a voyage from Arkhangelsk, Russia to London. Hoopoe was later refloated and taken in to Harwich.
Hope	United Kingdom	The ship was driven ashore at Seacombe. She was on a voyage from Liverpool to Waterford. She was later refloated.
Hugh William	United Kingdom	The ship was wrecked on the Hoyle Bank. Her crew were rescued. She was on a voyage from Liverpool to Newfoundland.
Industry	United Kingdom	The ship was lost near Marstrand, Sweden.
Jane	United Kingdom	The ship was driven ashore at Wells-next-the-Sea.
John & Thomas	United Kingdom	The ship ran aground on the Gubane Sand Spit, in the Irish Sea off the coast of County Mayo. She was on a voyage from Christiansand, Norway to Ballina, County Mayo. John & Thomas was later refloated and taken in to Killala, County Mayo.
John Bull	United Kingdom	The ship was driven ashore near the mouth of the Humber. Her crew were rescued. She was on a voyage from Great Yarmouth to Newcastle upon Tyne.
Juno	United Kingdom	The ship was driven ashore and wrecked near Blakeney. Her crew were rescued.
Kingfisher	United Kingdom	The ship was driven ashore and wrecked in Swanage Bay.
Le Curieux	France	The ship was lost off "Renneville" with the loss of all 22 people on board. She was on a voyage from Granville, Manche to Jersey, Channel Islands.
Lord Duncan	United Kingdom	The ship was driven ashore at Bridlington. She was refloated on 27 November.
Linnet	United Kingdom	The ship capsized and sank with the loss of two lives. She was on a voyage from Carlisle to Maryport, Cumberland.
Magnet	United Kingdom	The ship was driven ashore on the Isle of Portland.
Manchester	United Kingdom	The ship was driven ashore near the mouth of the Humber. Her crew were rescued. She was on a voyage from Great Yarmouth to Newcastle upon Tyne.
Mantura	United Kingdom	The ship was driven ashore and wrecked at Caister-on-Sea, Norfolk. She was on a voyage from London to Hull.
Margaretta	United Kingdom	The ship was driven ashore and wrecked in Fishguard Bay. Her crew were rescued. She was on a voyage from Liverpool to Cork.
Market Maid	United Kingdom	The ship was driven ashore and wrecked near Blakeney. Her crew were rescued. She was on a voyage from Newhaven, Sussex to Whitby.
Mary Ann	United Kingdom	The ship was driven ashore and wrecked on Guernsey, Channel Islands, She was on a voyage from London to Waterford.
Monte Galetta	Kingdom of Sardinia	The ship was driven ashore near Savona, Kingdom of Sardinia. She was on a voyage from Lisbon, Portugal to Genoa. Monte Galetta was later refloated and taken in to Savona.
Nelly	United Kingdom	The ship was driven ashore. She was on a voyage from Riga, Russia to London. Nelly was later refloated and taken in to Harwich for repairs.
Neptune	France	The ship was driven ashore and wrecked near Marseille, Bouches-du-Rhône.
Prince of Saxe Cobourg	United Kingdom	The ship was driven ashore at Shoreham-by-Sea, Sussex. She was refloated the next day and taken in to Shoreham-by-Sea.
Richmond	United Kingdom	The Thames barge was wrecked on the Nore with the loss of four of the five people on board.
Sisters	United Kingdom	The ship was driven ashore near North Somercotes, Lincolnshire. Her crew were rescued. She was on a voyage from Dover, Kent to Newcastle upon Tyne, Northumberland.
Squirrell	United Kingdom	The ship was driven ashore and severely damaged at Bridlington. She was refloated on 28 November and taken in to Bridlington.
Strawberry	United Kingdom	The ship was driven ashore on the Isle of Portland.
Swift	United Kingdom	The schooner was driven ashore and damaged on the Isle of Portland. She was refloated on 27 November and taken in to Weymouth, Dorset.
Themis	Hamburg	The ship was driven ashore at Ottendorf, Duchy of Schleswig. She was on a voyage from Hamburg to Hull, Yorkshire, United Kingdom.
Union	United Kingdom	The ship was driven ashore and severely damaged at Weymouth. She was on a voyage from London to Plymouth, Devon. Union was refloated on 13 November.
Valiant	United Kingdom	The ship was driven ashore in Fishguard Bay. Her crew were rescued. She was on a voyage from Barrow-in-Furness, Lancashire to Newport, Monmouthshire.
Venus	United Kingdom	The ship was driven ashore on the Isle of Portland. She was refloated on 13 November.
Venus	United Kingdom	The ship was driven ashore at Saltfleet, Lincolnshire. She was on a voyage from London to Leeds, Yorkshire.
Voltaire	France	The ship was driven ashore near Barfleur, Manche. She was on a voyage from Le Havre, Seine-Inférieure to New York, United States.
William	United Kingdom	The ship was driven ashore near North Somercotes. Her crew were rescued. She was on a voyage from Great Yarmouth to Newcastle upon Tyne.

== 11 November ==
List of shipwrecks: 11 November 1825
Ship	State	Description
Ariadne	Hamburg	The ship was driven ashore on the British coast. She was on a voyage from Hamburg to Port-au-Prince, Haiti. Ariadne was later refloated and put into Harwich, Essex, United Kingdom.
Bee	United Kingdom	The ship was driven ashore near Grimsby, Lincolnshire. She was on a voyage from London to Leeds, Yorkshire.
Cimon	(First Hellenic Republic) Hellenic Navy	The Brig of War was driven ashore and wrecked on the east coast of Alderney, Channel Islands. Her 55 crew were rescued and the vessel was plundered by the local inhabitants. She was on a voyage from London, United Kingdom to Hydra.
Courier	United Kingdom	The ship was wrecked on the Coatham Sand, in the North Sea off Stockton-on-Tees, Yorkshire. She was on a voyage from Gothenburg, Sweden to Leith, Lothian.
Courier	United Kingdom	The ship was driven ashore between Ingoldmells and Grimsby, Lincolnshire.
Daphne	United Kingdom	The ship ran aground on the Onion Sand, in the North Sea off the coast of Essex, and sank. Her crew were rescued.
Elizabeth	United Kingdom	The sloop was wrecked on Cramond Island, Lothian. Her crew were rescued. She was on a voyage from Dundee, Forfarshire to St. Davids, Pembrokeshire.
Gottfried Betty	Hamburg	The ship was wrecked near Royan, Charente-Maritime, France with the loss of two of her six crew.
Grampion	United Kingdom	The ship was driven ashore between Ingoldmells and Grimsby. She was on a voyage from Aberdeen to Great Yarmouth, Norfolk. Grampion was later refloated and taken in to Grimsby.
Grande Terre	France	The ship was driven ashore in the Charente at Rochefort, Charente-Maritime. She was later refloated.
Halifax	United Kingdom	The ship was driven ashore and wrecked near Grimsby with the loss of all hands. She was on a voyage from London to Leeds.
Henry Sagunet	France	The ship was driven ashore in the Charente at Rochefort.
Jeune Rose	France	The ship was driven ashore and wrecked at Carteret, Manche. Her crew were rescued.
London	United Kingdom	The smack was wrecked on the Shipwash Sand, in the North Sea off the coast of Essex. Her crew were rescued. She was on a voyage from Arbroath, Forfarshire to London.
Lord Nelson	United Kingdom	The ship was lost on the Knowl Sand, in the North Sea off the mouth of the River Tees.
Nelly and Jane	United Kingdom	The ship sank in the River Shannon. She was on a voyage from Limerick to Liverpool, Lancashire. The ship was consequently condemned.
Proven	Netherlands	The ship was driven ashore and wrecked near Royan with the loss of a crew member.
Rob Roy	United Kingdom	The ship was wrecked near "Wingo". Her crew were rescued. She was on a voyage from Kiel, Duchy of Holstein. to Gibraltar.
Tantivy	United Kingdom	The ship struck the Arklow Bank, in the Irish Sea and foundered. Her crew survived. She was on a voyage from Liverpool to Newfoundland, British North America.
Venus	United Kingdom	The ship was driven ashore at Saltfleet, Lincolnshire. She was on a voyage from London to Leeds. Venus was refloated in late November and resumed her voyage.
Victor	France	The ship was driven ashore on the Île d'Aix, Charente-Maritime. She was on a voyage from Saint Thomas, Virgin Islands to Bordeaux, Gironde.
Vittoria	United Kingdom	The ship was driven ashore and sunk between Ingoldmells and Grimsby. She was refloated in late November and taken in to Hull, Yorkshire.

== 12 November ==
List of shipwrecks: 12 November 1825
Ship	State	Description
Ankers Haab	Netherlands	The ship was wrecked near Ribe, Denmark. She was on a voyage from Dram, Norway to Amsterdam, North Holland.
Duke of Wellington	United Kingdom	The ship sprang a leak and was abandoned by her crew. Shew as on a voyage from North Shields, County Durham to Porto, Portugal.
Harmony	United Kingdom	The ship was wrecked on the Colorados. She was on a voyage from Jamaica to Halifax, Nova Scotia, British North America.
Hercules	United Kingdom	The ship was run down and sunk in the Bristol Channel. Her sixteen crew took to the lifeboats. They were rescued the next day by Mary Simpkins (United Kingdom). Hercules was on a voyage from London to Liverpool, Lancashire.
Hero	United Kingdom	The ship foundered in the North Sea off Terschelling, Netherlands with the loss of all hands. She was on a voyage from Saint Petersburg, Russia to London.
Industrious Mary	United Kingdom	The sloop struck the Carr Rock, in the North Sea and foundered. Her crew survived. She was on a voyage from St. Andrews, Fife to Leith, Lothian. Industrious Mary was later refloated and taken in to Crail, Fife for repairs.
Lydia	Denmark	The ship was lost in the Garonne. Her crew were rescued. She was on a voyage from Bordeaux, Gironde to Copenhagen.

== 13 November ==
List of shipwrecks: 13 November 1825
Ship	State	Description
Captain	United Kingdom	The ship was driven ashore at Cleethorpes, Lincolnshire. She was on a voyage from Aberdeen to Great Yarmouth, Norfolk. Captain was later refloated and taken in to Hull, Yorkshire, where she arrived on 21 November.
Enterprise	United States	The ship was lost in the Abaco Islands. Her crew were rescued. She was on a voyage from Baltimore, Maryland to Havana, Cuba.
Industry	United Kingdom	The ship was off Great Yarmouth whilst on a voyage from Spalding, Lincolnshire to London. No further trace, presumed foundered in the North Sea with the loss of all hands.

== 14 November ==
List of shipwrecks: 14 November 1825
Ship	State	Description
Hercules	United Kingdom	The ship sank at Great Yarmouth, Norfolk.
Rhône	France	The ship foundered at the mouth of the Loire. She was on a voyage from Guadeloupe to Nantes, Loire-Inférieure.

== 15 November ==
List of shipwrecks: 15 November 1825
Ship	State	Description
Ann	United Kingdom	The ship was wrecked on "Lavenscaar". She was on a voyage from Gallipoli, Ottoman Empire to Saint Petersburg, Russia.
Flora	United Kingdom	The ship was lost on the "Island of Penny". She was on a voyage from Saint Petersburg to Bristol, Gloucestershire. Flora floated off on 9 December.
Jonge Nicholas	Netherlands	The ship was in collision with a Dutch galiot in the English Channel off Beachy Head, Sussex, United Kingdom and was abandoned by her crew. All on board were rescued by Catherina Charlotte (flag unknown). The galiot sank. Jonge Nicholas was beached at Boulogne, Pas-de-Calais, France on 19 November.
Pilote	France	The ship foundered off Noirmoutier, Vendée with the loss of all but her captain. She was on a voyage from Noirmoutier to Mevagissey, Cornwall, United Kingdom.

== 17 November ==
List of shipwrecks: 17 November 1825
Ship	State	Description
Britannia	United Kingdom	The ship struck the Redcar Rocks, in the North Sea off the coast of Yorkshire and was wrecked. She was on a voyage from Newcastle upon Tyne, Northumberland to London.
Duke of Wellington	United Kingdom	The ship was driven ashore on Callantsoog, Groningen, Netherlands.
Generous Friends	United Kingdom	The ship was run down and sunk in Liverpool Bay by the steamship Lee (United Kingdom) with the loss of two of the nine people on board. She was on a voyage from Westport, County Mayo to Liverpool, Lancashire.

== 18 November ==
List of shipwrecks: 18 November 1825
Ship	State	Description
Agnes Ross	United Kingdom	The sloop was driven ashore at Lamlash, Isle of Arran. She was on a voyage from Stranraer, Dumfriesshire to Glasgow, Renfrewshire.
Amity	United Kingdom	The sloop was driven ashore and wrecked at Irvine, Ayrshire.
Ann	United Kingdom	The full-rigged ship was driven ashore between Ayr and Irvine.
Ann & Jean	United Kingdom	The ship was driven ashore on Islay, Inner Hebrides.
Avon	United Kingdom	The barque was driven ashore at Troon.
Britannia	United Kingdom	The ship foundered off Saltcoats, Ayrshire.
Brothers	United Kingdom	The ship ran aground on the Foreness Rock, Margate, Kent. She was on a voyage from Belfast, County Antrim to London. Brothers was refloated on 20 November and taken in to Margate.
Catherine	United Kingdom	The brig was driven ashore and wrecked in Troon Bay.
Charente	United Kingdom	The brig was driven ashore and wrecked at Troon, Ayrshire. Her crew were rescued. She was on a voyage from Limerick to Glasgow, Renfrewshire.
Christian	United Kingdom	The ship was driven ashore at Port Ellen, Islay. She was on a voyage from Liverpool, Lancashire to Sligo.
Enterprise	United Kingdom	The brig was driven ashore and wrecked at Irvine.
Greenfield	United Kingdom	The brig was driven ashore and wrecked at Troon with the loss of two lives.
Harvest	United States	The schooner was lost on Boche Island, North Carolina.
Jean	United Kingdom	The smack was driven ashore at Troon.
Janet	United Kingdom	The sloop was driven ashore at Troon, Ayrshire. Three of her crew were rescued.
Janet and Margaret	United Kingdom	The ship was driven ashore and wrecked at Killala, County Mayo. Her crew were rescued. She was on a voyage from Glasgow to Ballina, County Mayo.
John	United Kingdom	The ship ran aground off Bornholm, Denmark. She was on a voyage from Riga, Russia to Liverpool.
John and Mary	United Kingdom	The ship was driven ashore at Port Ellen.
Jura	United Kingdom	The ship was driven ashore at Port Ellen.
Manchester	United Kingdom	The ship was driven ashore in the Clyde.
Mersey	United Kingdom	The ship was driven ashore in the Clyde.
Rob Roy	United Kingdom	The ship was driven ashore in the Clyde.
Sim	United Kingdom	The ship was driven ashore in the Clyde.
Three Sisters	United Kingdom	The ship was driven ashore in the Clyde.
Triant	United Kingdom	The brig was driven ashore between Ayr and Irvine.
Unity	United Kingdom	The schooner was driven ashore and wrecked at Ayr. Her crew were rescued. She was on a voyage from Dundalk, County Louth to Ayr.
Webster	United Kingdom	The ship ran aground on the Foreness Rock. She was on a voyage from Belfast to London. Webster was refloated on 20 November and taken in to Margate.
William Hoeg	United Kingdom	The ship was wrecked at Port Rush, County Antrim.

== 19 November ==
List of shipwrecks: 19 November 1825
Ship	State	Description
Elizabeth	United Kingdom	The ship ran aground on the Goodwin Sands, Kent. Seven of her twelve crew abandoned her. She was on a voyage from Quebec City, Lower Canada, British North America to London. Elizabeth was later refloated and taken in to Ramsgate, Kent.
San Joseph	Kingdom of Sardinia	The ship was wrecked at Mahón, Menorca, Spain. She was on a voyage from Genoa to Havana, Captaincy General of Cuba.

== 20 November ==
List of shipwrecks: 20 November 1825
Ship	State	Description
Anson	United Kingdom	The ship was driven ashore and wrecked at Sunderland, County Durham.
Barrick	United Kingdom	The ship was destroyed by fire at Kalmar, Sweden. She was on a voyage from Visby, Sweden to Hull, Yorkshire.
Christian	United Kingdom	The ship was driven ashore at Port Ellen, Islay. She was on a voyage from Liverpool, Lancashire to Sligo.
John and Mary	United Kingdom	The ship was driven ashore at Port Ellen.
Jura	United Kingdom	The ship was driven ashore at Port Ellen.
Naparina	United Kingdom	The ship was wrecked on the coast of Trinidad.
Nile	United Kingdom	The ship was driven ashore near Berck, Pas-de-Calais, France. Her crew were rescued. She was on a voyage from Tenerife, Canary Islands to London.
Sarah	United Kingdom	The schooner was lost on the Barnard Sand, in the North Sea. Her crew were rescued.
William & Isabella	United Kingdom	The ship was abandoned in the North Sea. Her crew were rescued by Superb (United Kingdom). William & Isabella was on a voyage from Sunderland to Inverness.

== 21 November ==
List of shipwrecks: 21 November 1825
Ship	State	Description
Caroline	United Kingdom	The ship was driven ashore in Keluart Bay. Her crew were rescued.
Jane	United Kingdom	The ship was abandoned in the Atlantic Ocean. Her crew were rescued by Mayflower (United Kingdom). Jane was on a voyage from Newfoundland, British North America to Liverpool, Lancashire.

== 22 November ==
List of shipwrecks: 22 November 1825
Ship	State	Description
George	United Kingdom	The ship was lost off Stromstad, Sweden.
Lady Charlotte	United Kingdom	The ship foundered in the Atlantic Ocean. Her crew were rescued. She was on a voyage from Seville, Spain to London.
Mariner	United Kingdom	The brig was driven ashore near St Julian's Bay, Malta.
Silence	United Kingdom	The ship was driven ashore on Dragør, Denmark. She was on a voyage from Saint Petersburg, Russia to London.
Waller	United Kingdom	The ship was driven ashore and wrecked near Rutland, County Donegal. She was on a voyage from Limerick to Liverpool, Lancashire.

== 23 November ==
List of shipwrecks: 23 November 1825
Ship	State	Description
Hannah	United Kingdom	The ship was driven ashore at Miramichi, New Brunswick.
Lincoln	United Kingdom	The ship was driven ashore at Miramichi.
Maria Hedwig	Prussia	The ship was driven ashore on Bornholm, Denmark.
Neptunus	Flag unknown	The ship was wrecked at "Monkwich", Russia. She was on a voyage from Saint Petersburg to Guernsey, Channel Islands.

== 25 November ==
List of shipwrecks: 25 November 1825
Ship	State	Description
Agnes	United Kingdom	The ship was driven ashore in Lamlash Bay. She was on a voyage from Stranraer, Wigtownshire to Glasgow, Renfrewshire.
Atalanta	Hamburg	The ship was wrecked on the Vogel Sand, in the North Sea. Her crew were rescued. She was on a voyage from Guayaquil, Gran Colombia to Hamburg.
Betsey and Ann	United Kingdom	The ship was driven ashore and wrecked between Seaton Carew, County Durham and the mouth of the River Tees. Her crew were rescued by the Seaton Carew Lifeboat.
Hamilton	United Kingdom	The brig struck rocks and sank at Elie, Fife.
Stirling	United Kingdom	The ship was driven ashore and wrecked near Pettycur, Fife. Her crew were rescued. She was on a voyage from Leith, Lothian to Stirling.
Vigilantië	Netherlands	The ship was driven ashore near Noordwijk, South Holland. She was on a voyage from London, United Kingdom to Rotterdam, South Holland.

== 26 November ==
List of shipwrecks: 26 November 1825
Ship	State	Description
Bottles	United Kingdom	The ship was driven ashore near St Bees, Cumberland. Her crew were rescued. She was on a voyage from Bangor to Whitehaven, Cumberland.
Dolphin	United Kingdom	The ship was driven ashore on the Point of Tortosa, Spain. Her crew were rescued. She was on a voyage from Tarragona, Spain to Falmouth, Cornwall. Dolphin was refloated on 28 November and returned to Tarragona, where she was repaired.
Fancy	United Kingdom	The ship was driven ashore and severely damaged at Beaumaris, Anglesey. She was on a voyage from Liverpool, Lancashire to Cork. Fancy was refloated on 29 November and taken in to Beaumaris.
Newcastle and Berwick Packet	United Kingdom	The ship was driven ashore at the mouth of the River Ribble, near Blackpool, Lancashire. She was on a voyage from Dundee, Forfarshire to Liverpool.
Renown	United Kingdom	The ship was driven ashore and severely damaged at Dumfries. She was on a voyage from Porto, Portugal to Glasgow, Renfrewshire. She was refloated on 2 December and made for Greenock, Renfrewshire.
Shamrock	United Kingdom	The ship was driven ashore and severely damaged at Hartlepool, County Durham.
Thomas & Ann	United Kingdom	The ship was driven ashore at Spurn Point, Yorkshire. She was on a voyage from London to Hull, Yorkshire.

== 27 November ==
List of shipwrecks: 27 November 1825
Ship	State	Description
Agnes	Sweden	The ship was driven ashore at Gothenburg. She was on a voyage from Gothenburg to Leith, Lothian, United Kingdom.
Asia	United Kingdom	The brig was wrecked on the Caloot Bank, in the North Sea off Vlissingen, Zeeland, Netherlands. She was on a voyage from Rio de Janeiro, Brazil to Antwerp, Netherlands.
Crescent	United Kingdom	The ship was driven ashore on Saltholm, Denmark. She was n a voyage from Hull, Yorkshire to Kiel, Prussia.
Cumberland	United Kingdom	The ship was driven ashore at Gothenburg.
Fame	Flag unknown	The ship was driven ashore at "Rasborg". She was on a voyage from St. Ubes, Portugal to "Borgo".
Fortitude	United Kingdom	The ship ran aground on the Falsterbo Reef and was consequently beached at Ystad with the loss of two of her crew. She was on a voyage from Danzig to Bristol, Gloucestershire.
Gilsland	United Kingdom	The ship was driven ashore and severely damaged at Blakeney, Norfolk. She was on a voyage from London to Sunderland, County Durham.
Gustav	Stettin	The ship was driven ashore on Saltholm. She was on a voyage from London to Stettin. Gustave was later refloated. She put into Copenhagen, Denmark, arriving on 13 December.
Jesmond	United Kingdom	The ship was driven ashore at Gothenburg. She was on a voyage from Saint Petersburg, Russia to Newcastle upon Tyne, Northumberland.
Latona	United Kingdom	The ship was driven ashore and wrecked 35 nautical miles (65 km) north of Marstrand, Sweden. Her crew were rescued. She was on a voyage from Danzig to Grangemouth, Stirlingshire.
Lively	United Kingdom	The ship was wrecked on Bardsey Island, Pembrokeshire with the loss of two of her crew. She was on a voyage from Newport, Monmouthshire to Liverpool.
Maria	Denmark	The ship was lost at Helsingør. Her crew were rescued. She was on a voyage from Málaga, Spain to Copenhagen.
Mary	United Kingdom	The brig foundered in the Irish Sea with the loss of all eleven hands. She was on a voyage from Dublin to Liverpool, Lancashire.
Prince Regent	United Kingdom	The ship was on her way from St John, New Brunswick, to Newport, when she encountered a gale at 50°N 25°W. She received considerable damage to her upperworks and took on eight feet of water in her hold. On 13 December she passed through Cardiff Roads.
Three Friends	United Kingdom	The ship was driven ashore on Saltholm.

== 28 November ==
List of shipwrecks: 28 November 1825
Ship	State	Description
Camilla	Kingdom of Sardinia	The ship departed from Genoa for Alvarado, Veracruz, Mexico. She was subsequently lost.
Economy	United Kingdom	The ship was driven ashore on the Dutch coast. She was on a voyage from Leith, Lothian to Rotterdam, Netherlands.
Geduld	Prussia	The ship foundered off the coast of Norway. She was on a voyage from London, United Kingdom to Memel.
Groenlandia	Netherlands	The ship was driven ashore and wrecked at Dieppe, Seine-Inférieure, France.
Maria	United Kingdom	The ship was driven ashore on "Endelow", Denmark. She was on a voyage from Horsens, Denmark to Hull, Yorkshire.
Providence	United Kingdom	The schooner was driven ashore and wrecked at Dundee, Forfarshire. Her crew were rescued. She was on a voyage from Arbroath, Forfarshire to Kinghorn, Fife.
Retrieve	(United Kingdom of Great Britain and Ireland) Dominica	The ship was driven ashore and wrecked at Shediac, New Brunswick, British North America.
Severn	United Kingdom	The ship was abandoned in the Baltic Sea with the loss of a crew member. Survivors were rescued by Rosella (United Kingdom). Severn was on a voyage from Memel to Chepstow, Monmouthshire. She was later discovered at sea and taken in to a port near Karlskrona, Sweden.
Twee Gebroeders	Netherlands	The ship was driven ashore near Padingbüttel, Hamburg. She was on a voyage from Antwerp to Leith, Lothian, United Kingdom.
Zephyr	Sweden	The ship was driven ashore 6 nautical miles (11 km) north of Libava, Courland Governorate with the loss of two of her crew. She was on a voyage from Gävle to Livorno, Grand Duchy of Tuscany. Zephyr was declared a total loss.

== 29 November ==
List of shipwrecks: 29 November 1825
Ship	State	Description
Beresford	United Kingdom	The ship was driven ashore and wrecked at Sunderland, County Durham. Her crew were rescued.
Betsey and Ann	United Kingdom	The ship was driven ashore and wrecked near Stockton on Tees, Yorkshire. Her cfew were rescued by the Stockton Lifeboat. She was on a voyage from Pictou, Nova Scotia, British North America to Stockton on Tees.
Charles	United Kingdom	The ship was lost near Kungsbacka, Sweden. Her crew were rescued. SHe was on a voyage from Copenhagen, Denmark to Gothenburg, Sweden.
Grieeff Lamwig	Norway	The ship was abandoned in the North Sea. Her crew were rescued by Dido (United Kingdom).
Harbinger	United Kingdom	The ship was driven ashore near Ryhope, County Durham.
John	United Kingdom	The sloop sank at Greenock, Renfrewshire. Her crew were rescued. She was on a voyage from Glasgow, Renfrewshire to Dundalk, County Louth.
John	United Kingdom	The ship was driven ashore at Hartlepool, County Durham. Her crew were rescued.
Mary	United Kingdom	The ship was driven ashore at Hartlepool. Her crew were rescued.
Patriot	United Kingdom	The ship was driven ashore and wrecked at Staithes, Yorkshire. Her crew were rescued. She was on a voyage from Maldon, Essex to Sunderland.
Providence	United Kingdom	The ship was driven ashore and wrecked in the River Tay. Her crew were rescued. She was on a voyage from Arbroath, Forfarshire to the Firth of Forth.
Scotia	United Kingdom	The ship was driven ashore and wrecked near Stockton on Tees with the loss of all fourteen crew and a pilot. She was on a voyage from London to Sunderland.
Swift	United Kingdom	The smack was driven ashore and wrecked at Sunderland. Her crew were rescued.
Tamerlane	United Kingdom	The ship was driven ashore in Belfast Loch near "Grey Point", Ireland. She was on a voyage from Quebec City, Lower Canada, British North America to the Clyde. Tamerlane was refloated on 3 December and taken in to "Gamoyle" in a waterlogged condition. She arrived at Greenock, Renfrewshire on 13 January 1826.
Thames	United Kingdom	The ship was driven ashore on the south coast of Öland, Sweden. Her crew were rescued. She was on a voyage from Riga, Russia to London.
Thompsons	United Kingdom	The ship was driven ashore near Ryhope. Her crew were rescued. She was refloated on 19 December and taken in to Sunderland.

== 30 November ==
List of shipwrecks: 30 November 1825
Ship	State	Description
Baron	United Kingdom	The ship ran aground on Scroby Sands, Norfolk and sank. Her crew were rescued. She was on a voyage from Saint Petersburg, Russia to Cork.
Camilla	(Russian Empire) Grand Duchy of Finland	The ship was driven ashore and wrecked on Læsø, Denmark. She was on a voyage from Jakobstad to Dunkirk, Nord, France.
Concordia	United Kingdom	The schooner was driven ashore on Læsø.
Glory	United Kingdom	The brig was driven ashore and wrecked on Læsø. Her crew survived. She was on a voyage from Memel, Prussia to Dublin.
Guadeloupe	United Kingdom	The brig was driven ashore and wrecked on Læsø.
Kingfisher	United Kingdom	The sloop was wrecked on the North Bank, in Liverpool Bay, with the loss of all hands. She was on a voyage from Newry, County Antrim to Liverpool, Lancashire.
Ludvig	flag unknown	The galiot was driven ashore and wrecked on Læsø.
Margaret	United Kingdom	The ship was driven ashore at Limerick.
Mary	United Kingdom	The ship was driven ashore 2 nautical miles (3.7 km) north of Whitby, Yorkshire.
Messenger	United Kingdom	The ship was wrecked on the Dogheads Sand, in the North Sea off the coast of Lincolnshire. Her crew were rescued. She was on a voyage from Gainsborough, Lincolnshire to King's Lynn, Norfolk.
Nancy	United Kingdom	The ship was driven ashore near Beaumaris, Anglesey. She was on a voyage from Liverpool, Lancashire to Pwllheli, Caernarfonshire.
Nancy	United Kingdom	The ship was lost near Dundalk, County Louth.
Peggy	United Kingdom	The sloop was driven ashore and wrecked on Læsø. She was on a voyage from Saint Petersburg, Russia to Glasgow, Renfrewshire.
Perseverance	United Kingdom	The ship was driven ashore near Beaumaris. She was on a voyage from Liverpool to Aberdyfi, Merionethshire.
Ranger	United Kingdom	The ship foundered in the Baltic Sea off Hogland, Russia. Her crew were rescued.
Tamerlane	United Kingdom	The ship was driven ashore near Belfast, County Antrim. She was on a voyage from Quebec City, Lower Canada, British North America to the Clyde. She was later refloated.

== Unknown date ==
List of shipwrecks: Unknown date in November 1825
Ship	State	Description
Agenor	United Kingdom	The ship was driven ashore near Cuxhaven in early November. She was on a voyage from Memel, Prussia to Sheerness, Kent. Agenor was later refloated and taken in to Glückstadt, Duchy of Holstein.
Christina	United Kingdom	The ship was lost near Strömstad, Sweden with the loss of all hands. She was on a voyage from Riga, Russia to Kirkcaldy, Fife.
Columbus	United Kingdom	The ship foundered in the Atlantic Ocean off Land's End, Cornwall.
Connezione	Kingdom of Sardinia	The ship was wrecked at "Cape Calacri". She was on a voyage from Odesa to Genoa.
Diana	Russia	The ship was beached at Farsund, Norway. She was on a voyage from Arkhangelsk to London, United Kingdom.
Diligence	United Kingdom	The schooner was driven ashore in the Copeland Islands. She was on a voyage from Maryport, Cumberland to Belfast, County Antrim.
Elizabeth's Success	United Kingdom	The schooner was driven ashore and wrecked at Portsoy, Aberdeenshire. All on board were rescued. She was on a voyage from Stromness, Orkney Islands to Beauly, Inverness-shire.
Fame	United Kingdom	The ship was abandoned off Danzig. Her crew were rescued by Columbus (flag unknown).
Fancy	United Kingdom	The ship was driven ashore and wrecked near Penman Point. She was on a voyage from Liverpool, Lancashire to Sligo.
Favourite	United Kingdom	The ship was abandoned in the Atlantic Ocean before 8 November.
Flora	Sweden	The ship was lost on Penny Island. She was on a voyage from Saint Petersburg, Russia to Gothenburg.
Fortuna	United Kingdom	The ship was lost in the Gulf of Roses. Her crew were rescued. She was on a voyage from Genoa to Gibraltar.
Goede Hoepe	Netherlands	The ship was beached at Heligoland after 10 November. She was on a voyage from London to Amsterdam, North Holland.
Intrepid	United Kingdom	The ship was wrecked on the Gunfleet Sand, in the North Sea off the coast of Essex. She was on a voyage from Sunderland, County Durham to London.
Jane	United Kingdom	The ship was abandoned in the Atlantic Ocean on or before 22 November.
Johanna	Flag unknown	The ship was wrecked on the coast of Prussia. She was on a voyage from London to a Baltic port.
Johannes	Hamburg	The ship was driven ashore on Amrum, Denmark with the loss of her captain. She was on a voyage from St. Thomas, Virgin Islands to Hamburg.
Lewis	United States	The ship was wrecked on the Goodwin Sands, Kent before 10 November. She was on a voyage from Philadelphia, Pennsylvania, to Antwerp, Netherlands.
London	United Kingdom	The ship was driven ashore and wrecked at Wells-next-the-Sea, Norfolk. She was on a voyage from London to Glasgow, Renfrewshire.
Magdalena	Hamburg	The ship was wrecked near Brest, Finistère, France. She was on a voyage from Bordeaux, Gironde, France to Hamburg.
Maria Elisabeth	Netherlands	The ship was lost at Sandefjord, Norway between 18 and 21 November. She was on a voyage from Amsterdam to Larvik, Norway.
Marie	Norway	The ship was beached at Farsund. She was on a voyage from Hull, Yorkshire, United Kingdom to Bergen.
Michael	United Kingdom	The ship was driven ashore on Terschelling, Friesland, Netherlands. Her crew survived. She was on a voyage from Moss, Norway to Wexford.
Northumberland	United Kingdom	The brig was driven ashore and wrecked at Harwich, Essex in early November. Her crew were rescued by Caledonia (United Kingdom).
Oprigligkiden	Norway	The ship was driven ashore at Moy, County Clare, United Kingdom. She was on a voyage from Dram to Moy. Salvage was abandoned in May 1826 and she was sold for breaking.
Providence	United Kingdom	The ship departed from Great Yarmouth, Norfolk in early November for a Scottish port. No further trace and presumed foundered with the loss of all hands.
Reliance	United Kingdom	The ship was driven ashore in the River Shannon whilst on a voyage from Limerick to Glasgow, Renfrewshire. She was consequently condemned.
Rising Sun	United Kingdom	The ship foundered off Ramsgate Kent in early November.
Rose	United Kingdom	The ship was wrecked near Dunkirk, Nord, France with the loss of all hands. She was on a voyage from Plymouth, Devon, to Jersey, Channel Islands.
Thorpe Arnold	United Kingdom	The ship was abandoned in the North Sea. Her crew were rescued by Cynthia (United Kingdom). Thorpe Arnold was on a voyage from Memel to Hull. She came ashore at Thisted, Denmark on 26 November.
Venus	United Kingdom	The ship departed from Swansea, Glamorgan for Youghal, County Cork in early November. No further trace, presumed foundered in the Irish Sea with the loss of all hands.
Vittoria	Portugal	The brig sprang a leak in the Atlantic Ocean and was abandoned. Her six crew were rescued by Balthazar (Netherlands). She was on a voyage from Lisbon to Liverpool, Lancashire, United Kingdom.
Whitley Park	United Kingdom	The ship was driven ashore and wrecked at Hela, Prussia.
William	United Kingdom	The ship was wrecked on the North Reef, in the Baltic Sea. She was on a voyage from Danzig to London.
Woodcock	United Kingdom	The ship foundered in the Baltic Sea with the loss of all hands. She was on a voyage from Saint Petersburg to Liverpool.
