= List of shipwrecks in December 1825 =

The list of shipwrecks in December 1825 includes some ships sunk, wrecked or otherwise lost during December 1825.

== 1 December ==
List of shipwrecks: 1 December 1825
Ship	State	Description
Ann	United Kingdom	The ship was driven ashore at Rosentown, County Wexford with the loss of three of her crew. She was on a voyage from Newport, Monmouthshire to Glasgow, Renfrewshire.
Ant	United Kingdom	The ship was driven ashore in the Elbe downstream of Cuxhaven. She was on a voyage from Hamburg to King's Lynn, Norfolk.
Arctic	United Kingdom	The collier was lost on the Horse Sand, in The Solent off Portsmouth, Hampshire. Her crew were rescued. She was on a voyage from Sunderland, County Durham to Portsmouth. Arctic was refloated at the end of December and towed in to Portsmouth by HMS Lightning (Royal Navy).
Betriebsamkeit	Netherlands	The ship was wrecked near Skagen, Denmark. She was on a voyage from Riga, Russia to Antwerp.
Brilliant	United Kingdom	The ship was driven ashore and wrecked at Youghal, County Cork. Her crew were rescued. She was on a voyage from Ross-on-Wye, Herefordshire to Cork.
Defiance	United Kingdom	The ship was lost at Sutton, Dublin. She was on a voyage from Whitehaven, Cumberland to Dublin.
Dove	United Kingdom	The ship was driven ashore at Dungarvan, County Waterford. Her crew were rescued. She was on a voyage from Gothenburg, Sweden to Marseille, Bouches-du-Rhône, France.
Edward	United Kingdom	The ship was wrecked near Dublin. Her crew were rescued. She was on a voyage from Liverpool, Lancashire to New York, United States.
Ellen	United Kingdom	The ship was lost at Sutton, Dublin with the loss of five of her crew. She was on a voyage from Whitehaven to Dublin.
Fareham	United Kingdom	The ship was driven ashore at Portsmouth. She was later refloated.
Favourite	United Kingdom	The ship was driven ashore at Rosentown. Her crew were rescued. She was on a voyage from Bristol, Gloucestershire to Wick, Caithness or vice versa.
Felicity	United Kingdom	The ship was driven ashore at the Spanish Battery, Hartlepool, County Durham. Her crew were rescued. Felicity was refloated in mid-December and taken in to Hartlepool.
Fordersneslandet	Denmark	The ship was wrecked near Skagen.
Jane	United Kingdom	The ship was severely damaged at Dublin. She was on a voyage from Belfast, County Antrim to Dulin.
Janietta	United States	The ship was driven ashore at Skerries, County Dublin, United Kingdom. Her crew were rescued. She was on a voyage from Liverpool to Java.
Laurel	United Kingdom	The ship was driven ashore and wrecked at the Spanish Battery, Hartlepool. Her crew were rescued.
Macedonia	United Kingdom	The ship was driven ashore at Rosentown. Her crew were rescued. She was on a voyage from Newport to Liverpool.
Margaret	United Kingdom	The ship was driven ashore and wrecked at Douglas, Isle of Man with the loss of four lives. She was on a voyage from Newry, County Antrim to Liverpool.
Marys	United Kingdom	The ship was driven ashore near the mouth of the Humber. She was on a voyage from Saint Petersburg, Russia to Hull, Yorkshire. Marys was later refloated and found to be severely damaged.
Mayflower	(United Kingdom of Great Britain and Ireland) Isle of Man	The ship foundered in Derbyhaven Bay. Her crew were rescued. She was on a voyage from Whitehaven, Cumberland to Castletown.
Nancy	United Kingdom	The ship was driven ashore 2 nautical miles (3.7 km) west of Youghal. Her crew were rescued. She was on a voyage from Bristol to Cork.
Nancy	United Kingdom	The ship was driven ashore and wrecked near Dundalk, County Louth. Her crew were rescued. she was on a voyage from Whitehaven, Cumberland to Rush, County Dublin.
Newcastle	United Kingdom	The ship was driven ashore at Prior's Haven, County Durham. Her crew were rescued.
Nicholson	United Kingdom	The brig was driven ashore at Blackrock, Dublin. Her crew were rescued. She was on a voyage from Harrington, Cumberland to Dublin. Nicholson was later refloated and taken in to Kingstown, County Dublin.
Provost	United Kingdom	The ship was lost near Galway. She was on a voyage from Galway to London.
Sam	United Kingdom	The ship was driven ashore at Rosentown. Her crew were rescued. She was on a voyage from Bristol to Liverpool.
Susan & Ann	United Kingdom	The ship ran aground on the Sandhammer Reef, off Bornholm, Denmark. She later floated off and drifted to sea.
Swallow	United Kingdom	The ship was wrecked near Clogherhead, County Louth with the loss of all hands. She was on a voyage rom Liverpool to Waterford.
Telegraph	Netherlands	The galiot was driven ashore at Prior's Haven. Her crew were rescued.
Tiger	United Kingdom	The ship was driven ashore near Portaferry, County Down. She was on a voyage from Tenerife, Canary Islands to Glasgow, Renfrewshire. Tiger was later refloated and taken in to Newcastle, County Down.
Two Sisters	United Kingdom	The collier was driven ashore and wrecked at Lump's Fort, Portsmouth. Her crew were rescued. She was on a voyage from Sunderland to Portsmouth.
Usk	United Kingdom	The ship was wrecked in Dundrum Bay with the loss of five lives. She was on a voyage from Liverpool to Adra, Spain.
Wellington	United Kingdom	The schooner sank at Dublin.

== 2 December ==
List of shipwrecks: 2 December 1825
Ship	State	Description
Ann	United Kingdom	The ship was driven ashore near Helsingør, Denmark. Her crew were rescued. She was on a voyage from Riga, Russia to Londonderry.
Christiana	United Kingdom	The ship was wrecked on Patterson's Rock, off Sanda Island, Argyllshire. She was on a voyage from Greenock, Renfrewshire to Trinidad.
Effort	United Kingdom	The ship was driven ashore at Blyth, Northumberland. Her crew were rescued.
Elbe	United Kingdom	The ship was lost at Out Newton, Yorkshire. Her crew were rescued. She was on a voyage from Saint Petersburg, Russia to London.
Friheten	Sweden	The ship was driven ashore and sank at Helsingør. She was on a voyage from Marseille, Bouches-du-Rhône, France to Saint Petersburg.
Henriette	France	The ship foundered. Her crew were rescued by Solon (flag unknown). Henriette was on a voyage from Dunkirk, Nord to Fécamp, Seine-Inférieure.
Johnson	United Kingdom	The ship was driven ashore at Sunderland, County Durham.
Lady Robert	United Kingdom	The ship was driven ashore at Keiss, Caithness. Her crew were rescued. She was on a voyage from Saint Petersburg to Liverpool, Lancashire.
Lucy and Mary	United Kingdom	The ship was driven ashore at Sunderland.
Mayflower	United Kingdom	The ship sank in Derbyhaven Bay, Isle of Man.
Minerva	United Kingdom	The ship was driven ashore at Carnford Point, County Antrim. She was later refloated.
Newcastle	United Kingdom	The ship was driven ashore at Tynemouth Castle, County Durham. She was refloated in early February 1826 and taken in to South Shields.
Nicholson	United Kingdom	The ship was driven ashore near Blackrock, Dublin. She was on a voyage from Harrington, Cumberland to Dublin.
Orion	United Kingdom	The ship was driven ashore and wrecked on South Ronaldsay, Orkney Islands. Her crew were rescued. She was on a voyage from Danzig to Liverpool, Lancashire.
Return	United Kingdom	The ship was driven ashore at Sunderland. She was refloated on 5 December and taken in to Sunderland in a severely damaged condition.
Susannah	United Kingdom	The ship was driven ashore at South Shields, County Durham. Her crew were rescued.
Swallow	United Kingdom	The ship was driven ashore and wrecked at Bath, County Louth with the loss of all hands.
Telegraph	Bremen	The ship was driven ashore and wrecked at Tynemouth Castle. Her crew were rescued.
Union	United Kingdom	The ship was lost on the Lilleground, off Copenhagen, Denmark.
Young George	United Kingdom	The ship was driven ashore at South Shields.

== 3 December ==
List of shipwrecks: 3 December 1825
Ship	State	Description
Betties	United Kingdom	The ship was driven ashore at St. Bees, Cumberland. Her crew were rescued. She was on a voyage from Bangor to Whitehaven, Cumberland.
Denton	United Kingdom	The ship was wrecked at Helsingør, Denmark. Her crew were rescued. She was on a voyage from Saint Petersburg, Russia to London.
Harmony	United Kingdom	The ship was lost near Eartholmen, Denmark. She was on a voyage from Memel, Prussia to London.
Hope	United Kingdom	The ship was driven ashore on Öland, Sweden. She was on a voyage from Libava, Courland Governorate to Dundee, Forfarshire.
Industry	(United Kingdom of Great Britain and Ireland) British North America	The ship capsized in the Atlantic Ocean (50°51′N 19°30′W). Her crew were rescued by Essequibo ( (United Kingdom of Great Britain and Ireland) Demerara). Indusgtry was on a voyage from Quebec City, Lower Canada to Cork.
James	United Kingdom	The ship was driven ashore at the mouth of the Miramichi River. She was on a voyage from Miramichi, New Brunswick, British North America to Greenock, Renfrewshire.
John Thomas	(United Kingdom of Great Britain and Ireland) Jersey	The ship was abandoned in the Atlantic Ocean. Her crew were rescued by Alchymist (United Kingdom. John Thomas was on a voyage from Newfoundland, British North America to Jersey.
Maria and Harriet	United Kingdom	The ship was destroyed by fire at Ceará, Brazil.
Sophia	United Kingdom	The ship was lost off Bornholm, Denmark. She was on a voyage from Memel to London.
Union	United Kingdom	The ship was driven ashore at Dragør, Denmark.

== 4 December ==
List of shipwrecks: 4 December 1825
Ship	State	Description
Alert	United Kingdom	The ship was driven ashore at Thisted, Denmark. She was on a voyage from Saint Petersburg, Russia to London.
Lord Crawford	United Kingdom	The ship was wrecked near Kristianstad, Sweden. Her crew were rescued. She was on a voyage from Memel, Prussia to King's Lynn, Norfolk.
Martha Helena	Norway	The ship sprang a leak and was beached at "Kopperig". She was on a voyage from Great Yarmouth, Norfolk, United Kingdom to Porsgrund.
Mercurius	Sweden	The ship was abandoned in the North Sea off the coast of Jutland. Her crew were rescued by Frembringeren (Sweden). She was on a voyage from St. Ubes, Spain to Uddevalla.
Minerva	United Kingdom	The ship was driven ashore on Gotland, Sweden. She was on a voyage from Riga, Russia to Glasgow, Renfrewshire.
Prince of Waterloo	United Kingdom	The ship was wrecked on the Barnard Sand, in the North Sea off the coast of Essex. Her crew were rescued. She was on a voyage from Colchester, Essex to Hull, Yorkshire.
Star	United Kingdom	The ship was driven ashore and wrecked at Hela, Prussia. Her crew were rescued. She was on a voyage from Danzig to Plymouth, Devon.

== 5 December ==
List of shipwrecks: 5 December 1825
Ship	State	Description
Hibernia	United Kingdom	The ship was wrecked on the coast of Calabria, Kingdom of the Two Sicilies. She was on a voyage from Terranova de Sicilia to Messina.
John	United Kingdom	The ship was driven ashore and wrecked at the mouth of the River Shannon. She was on a voyage from Dublin to Limerick.
Sheffield	United Kingdom	The ship foundered in Cloghy Bay with the loss of all on board. She was on a voyage from Irvine, Ayrshire to Belfast, County Antrim.
Stag	United Kingdom	The ship struck the Elbe Rock and foundered in the Irish Sea off Kirkcolm, Wigtownshire. Her crew were rescued. She was on a voyage from Glasgow, Renfrewshire to Liverpool, Lancashire.
Thames	United Kingdom	The ship was wrecked on Götaland, Sweden. Her crew were rescued. She was on a voyage from Riga, Russia to London.

== 6 December ==
List of shipwrecks: 6 December 1825
Ship	State	Description
Astrea	Spain	The full-rigged ship was driven ashore at Cádiz.
Buenos Aurigo	Spain	The brig was driven ashore at Cádiz.
Charlotte	France	The ship was driven ashore on the "White Dike". She was on a voyage from Stockholm, Sweden to Honfleur, Calvados.
General Soublette	Gran Colombia	The privateer was driven ashore and wrecked at Gibraltar.
Lively	United Kingdom	The ship was run dwon and sunk in the Atlantic Ocean 15 leagues (45 nautical miles (83 km)) south west of the Isles of Scilly by Miranda (United Kingdom). Her crew were rescued by Watson (United Kingdom).
Loretto	Spain	The brig was driven ashore at Cádiz.
Mary	United Kingdom	The ship was driven ashore and wrecked at Whitehaven, Cumberland.
Nancy	United Kingdom	The ship struck the Sheringham Skiff, in the North Sea 6 nautical miles (11 km) off Cromer, Norfolk and was abandoned by her crew. she was on a voyage from a Baltic port to London.
Rohoboth	Gran Colombia	The ship was driven ashore at Cádiz.
Sarah	United Kingdom	The brig was driven ashore at Gibraltar.
St. Nicholas	Russia	The ship ran aground of Dragør, Denmark. She was on a voyage from Saint Petersburg to Lisbon, Portugal.
Seven Brothers	United Kingdom	The ship was abandoned in the Atlantic Ocean. Her crew were rescued by Golden Fleece (United Kingdom). Seven Brothers was on a voyage from Quebec City, Lower Canada, British North America to Dublin.
Teaplant	United States	The ship was driven ashore at Cádiz.
Washington	United States	The ship was driven ashore at Cádiz.
Ysselstrom	Netherlands	The ship was wrecked on Eierland, North Holland. She was on a voyage from Amsterdam, North Holland to Newcastle upon Tyne, Northumberland, United Kingdom.

== 7 December ==
List of shipwrecks: 7 December 1825
Ship	State	Description
Albion	United Kingdom	The ship was abandoned in the Atlantic Ocean. Tottenham (United Kingdom) rescued the crew. Albion was on a voyage from Hull, Yorkshire to Miramichi, New Brunswick, British North America. She came ashore at Loop Head, County Clare on 7 February 1826 and was wrecked.
Ceres	Prussia	The ship was sighted in the Øresund whilst on a voyage from Stralsund to London, United Kingdom. No further trace, presumed foundered with the loss of all hands.
Diana	United Kingdom	The ship was wrecked at Skagen, Denmark. She was on a voyage from Memel, Prussia to Dundalk, County Louth.
Frau Gretha	Hamburg	The ship was lost between Borkum, Kingdom of Hanover and Schiermonnikoog, Friesland, Netherlands. She was on a voyage from Hamburg to London.
Lovely Cruizer	United Kingdom	The ship was driven ashore near Gibraltar. She was on a voyage from Gibraltar to London.
Marquis of Drogheda	United Kingdom	The ship was abandoned in the Atlantic Ocean. Her crew were rescued by Prince of Orange (Netherlands). Marquis of Drogheda was on a voyage from Altea, Spain to Liverpool, Lancashire.
Margaret and Ann	United Kingdom	The ship was beached near Portaferry, County Antrim. She was on a voyage from Liverpool to Port Dundas, Renfrewshire.
Mary	United Kingdom	The ship was driven on to rocks at Sunderland, County Durham and wrecked. Her crew were rescued.
Mary	United States	The ship was driven ashore at Gibraltar.
Rosella	United Kingdom	The barque was driven ashore and wrecked on Bornholm, Denmark. Rosella was on the return leg of her maiden voyage, from Danzig to Newcastle upon Tyne, Northumberland. Emperor Alexander (United Kingdom), rescued part of Rosella's crew (the rest chose to remain on Bornholm), and the members of Severn's (United Kingdom) crew aboard Rosella.
Star	(United Kingdom of Great Britain and Ireland) Gibraltar	The ship was wrecked on the Barbary Coast. Her crew were rescued. She was on a voyage from Mogadore, Morocco to Gibraltar.
Susan & Sarah	United States	The ship was driven ashore at Gibraltar.

== 8 December ==
List of shipwrecks: 8 December 1825
Ship	State	Description
Admiral Villaret	France	The ship was driven ashore at Gibraltar. She was on a voyage from Saint-Malo, Ille-et-Vilaine to Trieste.
Argo	France	The ship was driven ashore at Gibraltar. She was on a voyage from Marseille, Bouches-du-Rhône to Martinique.
Concord	(United Kingdom of Great Britain and Ireland) British North America	The ship was driven ashore at Gibraltar.
Diana	United Kingdom	The brig was driven ashore crewless on "Justoen", Denmark.
Frederick	United Kingdom	The ship was driven ashore at Gibraltar. She was later refloated.
F. S. Johnston	United Kingdom	The ship was driven ashore and wrecked at Fort St Philip, Spain.
Grace	United Kingdom	The ship was driven ashore and wrecked at Gibraltar.
Henry	United Kingdom	The ship was driven ashore and wrecked at Gibraltar. She was on a voyage from Liverpool, Lancashire to Philadelphia, Pennsylvania, United States.
Huntress	United States	The ship was driven ashore at Gibraltar.
Imperatrice Carolina	France	The ship was driven ashore at Gibraltar.
Jachin	(United Kingdom of Great Britain and Ireland) Virgin Islands	The ship was driven ashore at Gibraltar.
Nancy	United Kingdom	The ship was driven ashore at Youghal, County Cork. She was on a voyage from Newport, Monmouthshire to Cork.
Olympia	United Kingdom	The ship was driven ashore at Gibraltar.
Oporto Packet	Portugal	The ship was driven ashore at Gibraltar. She was on a voyage from St. Jago de Cuba, Cuba to Trieste.
Pace	United Kingdom	The ship was driven ashore at Gibraltar.
Parradys	Bremen	The ship was wrecked on Ameland, Friesland. Her crew were rescued. She was on a voyage from Saint Petersburg, Russia to Bremen.
San Nicolo	Spain	The ship was driven ashore at Gibraltar.
Sarah	United Kingdom	The ship was driven ashore at Gibraltar.
Silk Worm	United States	The ship was driven ashore and wrecked at Gibraltar. She was on a voyage from Málaga, Spain to New York.
Señora Trinita	Spain	The ship was run down and sunk at Gibraltar.
Two Brothers	United Kingdom	The ship was beached at Trusthorpe, Lincolnshire. She was on a voyage from "Aalfstadt" to Hull, Yorkshire.
Union	United Kingdom	The ship was driven ashore at Gibraltar.
United States	United States	The ship was driven ashore at Gibraltar.
Virginia	United States	The ship was driven ashore and wrecked at Gibraltar.
Wellesley	United Kingdom	The ship was wrecked at Gibraltar.

== 9 December ==
List of shipwrecks: 9 December 1825
Ship	State	Description
Alice & James	United Kingdom	The ship struck the Scarlet Rocks and sank. She was on a voyage from Limerick to Liverpool, Lancashire.
Hibernia	United Kingdom	The ship was wrecked off the coast of Calabria, Spain. She was on a voyage from Terranova to Messina, Sicily.
Maria	Netherlands	The ship was driven ashore at Cádiz, Spain. She was on a voyage from Cette, Hérault, France to Amsterdam, North Holland.
Montenero	Spain	The ship was wrecked near Larache, Morocco. She was on a voyage from Gibraltar to Cartagena.
Œlus	United Kingdom	The ship foundered off "Tannager", Norway.

== 10 December ==
List of shipwrecks: 10 December 1825
Ship	State	Description
Dandy	United Kingdom	The ship was driven ashore near Harlingen, Friesland, Netherlands. She was on a voyage from London to Amsterdam, North Holland, Netherlands.
Gleaner	United States	The ship sprang a leak and was abandoned in the Atlantic Ocean. She was on a voyage from St. Jago de Cuba, Cuba to New London, Connecticut.
Speranza	Malta	The ship was driven ashore 10 nautical miles (19 km) east of Livorno, Grand Duchy of Tuscany. Her crew were rescued
Prince Regent	United Kingdom	The ship was lost in Blasquet Sound. Her crew were rescued. She was on a voyage from Liverpool, Lancashire to Galway.

== 11 December ==
List of shipwrecks: 11 December 1825
Ship	State	Description
Nelly	United Kingdom	The ship was driven ashore and wrecked at Wells-next-the-Sea, Norfolk. Her crew were rescued. She was on a voyage from Fredrikstad, Norway to London.
Oscar	Sweden	The ship was driven ashore and wrecked near Berwick upon Tweed, Northumberland, United Kingdom. Her crew were rescued. She was on a voyage from St. Ubes, Portugal to Gothenburg.
Three Brothers	United Kingdom	The ship was abandoned in the North Sea off the coast of Norfolk. She was on a voyage from Rotterdam, South Holland, Netherlands to Thornham, Norfolk.

== 12 December ==
List of shipwrecks: 12 December 1825
Ship	State	Description
John & James	United Kingdom	The ship was driven ashore at Figueira da Foz, Portugal. She had been refloated by 25 December.
Nordes Grundsen	Hamburg	The ship was driven ashore at Gibraltar. She was on a voyage from Hamburg to Gibraltar.

== 13 December ==
List of shipwrecks: 13 December 1825
Ship	State	Description
Halifax Packet	United Kingdom	The ship was driven ashore and wrecked at North Queensferry, Lothian. She was on a voyage from Charleston, Angus to Aberdeen.
Joseph	United Kingdom	The ship was driven ashore at Great Yarmouth, Norfolk, where she broke up over the next three days. She was on a voyage from Saint Petersburg, Russia to Liverpool, Lancashire.
Lady Hamilton	United Kingdom	The ship was driven ashore and wrecked on the Spanish coast 6 nautical miles (11 km) from Gibraltar. She was on a voyage from Naples, Kingdom of the Two Sicilies to London.
Olive Branch	United States	The ship was driven ashore near the Race Point Lighthouse, Cape Cod, Massachusetts. She was on a voyage from Antigua to Bath, Maine.
Rachel & Ann	United Kingdom	The ship ran aground on the Skitter Sand, in the North Sea and capsized. She was on a voyage from Bjornberg, Denmark to Hull, Yorkshire. She was later towed in to Hull by a steamship.
Sprightly	United Kingdom	The ship was driven ashore at Filey Bridge, Yorkshire. She was on a voyage from Great Yarmouth, Norfolk to Leith, Lothian. Sprightly was refloated the next day and taken in to Scarborough, Yorkshire.

== 14 December ==
List of shipwrecks: 14 December 1825
Ship	State	Description
Busy	United Kingdom	The ship was driven ashore near Rye, Sussex with the loss of four of her crew. She was on a voyage from São Miguel Island, Azores to London.
Caroline	Danzig	The ship was wrecked near Egersund, Norway. She was on a voyage from Liverpool, Lancashire, United Kingdom to Danzig.
Catharine	United Kingdom	The ship sprang a leak and was beached near Maranhão, Brazil, where she was wrecked. She was on a voyage from Maranhão to Liverpool.
Charles	United States	The ship was driven ashore at Ocracoke, North Carolina.
Exchange	United Kingdom	The ship was driven ashore and damaged near Patuxent, Maryland, United States. She was on a voyage from Liverpool, Lancashire to Baltimore, Maryland, United States. Exchange was refloated on 16 December.
Charles	United States	The ship was driven ashore and wrecked ar Ocracoke, North Carolina.
Neptune	United Kingdom	The ship ran aground on the Arklow Bank, in the Irish Sea. She was refloated but consequently foundered. Her crew were rescued. Neptune was on a voyage from St. Ubes, Spain to Dublin.
Newton	United Kingdom	The ship was driven ashore at Shoreham-by-Sea, West Sussex and broke her back. She was on a voyage from São Miguel Island to London. Newton was refloated the next day and taken in to Shoreham-by-Sea in a severely damaged condition.
Prince Frederick	Norway	The ship was driven ashore and wrecked at Egersund. She was on a voyage from London to Larvik.
Vigilant	United Kingdom	The ship foundered in the English Channel off Weymouth, Dorset with the loss of all but one of her crew. She was on a voyage from Hamburg to Essaouira, Morocco.

== 15 December ==
List of shipwrecks: 15 December 1825
Ship	State	Description
Ann	United Kingdom	The ship collided with the brig Hannah (United Kingdom) and foundered in the North Sea off Lowestoft, Suffolk. Her crew were rescued. Ann was on a voyage from Charlestown, Cornwall to Hull, Yorkshire.
Bliss	United States	The ship was wrecked on the coast of the Florida Territory. Her crew were rescued. She was on a voyage from Jamaica to Baltimore, Maryland.
Catherine	United Kingdom	The ship sprang a leak and was beached on the Brazilian coast, where she was subsequently wrecked. She was on a voyage from Maranhão, Brazil to Liverpool, Lancashire.
Eslington	United Kingdom	The ship was lost off Föhr, Denmark with the loss of a crew member. She was on a voyage from Scarborough, Yorkshire to Hamburg.
Unge Tobias	Sweden	The ship ran aground at Hitterø, Norway. Her crew were rescued. She was on a voyage from Stockholm to Saint-Malo, Ille-et-Vilaine, France.

== 16 December ==
List of shipwrecks: 16 December 1825
Ship	State	Description
Betsey and Caroline	Netherlands	The ship ran aground on the North Haaks Sandbank, in the North Sea off Texel, North Holland and was wrecked. There were fourteen survivors. She was on a voyage from Batavia, Netherlands East Indies to Amsterdam, North Holland.
Elizabeth	United Kingdom	The ship was wrecked at Ensenada, Argentina.
Sceptre	United Kingdom	The ship ran aground on the Newcombe Sand, in the North Sea off the coast of Norfolk, and was abandoned by all bar her captain. She was on a voyage from Colchester, Essex to Hull, Yorkshire. Sceptre was later reboarded by her crew and refloated.

== 17 December ==
List of shipwrecks: 17 December 1825
Ship	State	Description
Ann	Danzig	The ship was driven ashore at Dragør, Denmark.
Amelia	Danzig	The ship was driven ashore and wrecked at Dragør. She was on a voyage from Danzig to London, United Kingdom.
Elizabeth Henrietta	(United Kingdom of Great Britain and Ireland) New South Wales	The brig was wrecked at Newcastle, New South Wales.
Planter	United Kingdom	The ship ran aground on the Dry Tortugas. She was on a voyage from Jamaica to Saint John, New Brunswick, British North America. She was later refloated and taken in to Key West, Florida Territory.
Sirene	Rostock	The ship was driven ashore and wrecked near Dragør. She was on a voyage from Rostock to Colchester, Essex, United Kingdom.

== 18 December ==
List of shipwrecks: 18 December 1825
Ship	State	Description
Augusta	Rostock	The ship was sighted in the Øresund whilst on a voyage from Rostock to London, United Kingdom. No further trace, presumed foundered with the loss of all hands.
Christian	United Kingdom	The ship ran aground on the Foreness Rock, Margate, Kent and was damaged. She was on a voyage from Dublin to London. Christian was refloated the next day. Her cargo was offloaded and she proceeded to London in a leaky condition.
Friends	United Kingdom	The ship was driven ashore and wrecked at Barry Island, Glamorgan. Her crew were rescued. She was on a voyage from Barnstaple, Devon to Cardiff, Glamorgan. Friends was later refloated and taken in to Barry for repairs.
Henrietta	(United Kingdom of Great Britain and Ireland) Jamaica	Jamaica: The sloop was wrecked in Annatto Bay.
Kingston Packet	(United Kingdom of Great Britain and Ireland) Jamaica	The schooner was driven ashore and wrecked in Montego Bay.
Princess Royal	(United Kingdom of Great Britain and Ireland) Jamaica	The sloop was wrecked in Annatto Bay.
Sally	(United Kingdom of Great Britain and Ireland) Grenada	The sloop was wrecked on a reef in Grand Becalet Baym Grenada.
Vulture	United Kingdom	The ship foundered in the Grand Banks of Newfoundland. All on board were rescued by Phoebe (United Kingdom). She was on a voyage from Liverpool, Lancashire to New York, United States.

== 19 December ==
List of shipwrecks: 19 December 1825
Ship	State	Description
Aguilar	United Kingdom	The ship put into Cape Town leaking badly. She was coming from Sincapore, Penang, and Mauritius, bound for London when a gale at Algoa Bay on 11 and 12 December damaged her badly. First reports were that she would be repaired, but she was condemned and sold for breaking up.
Bolton	United Kingdom	The ship was driven ashore and wrecked in Tramore Bay with the loss of all hands.
Ceres	United Kingdom	The brig was driven ashore at Cobh, County Cork.
Diligente	Portugal	The schooner was driven ashore and severely damaged at Cobh.
Dre Gebroeders	flag unknown	The ship was driven ashore in Studland Bay. Her crew were rescued. She was on a voyage from Newcastle upon Tyne, Northumberland to Rochefort, Charente-Maritime, France.
Eendracht	Flag unknown	The ship was driven ashore and wrecked at Penzance, Cornwall. She was on a voyage from Salou, Spain to London, United Kingdom.
Expedition	United Kingdom	The sloop was driven ashore and severely damaged at Cobh.
Flora	United Kingdom	The ship was driven ashore and wrecked in Tramore Bay with the loss of all hands.
Glasgow	United Kingdom	The schooner was driven ashore at Cobh.
Godolphin	United Kingdom	The ship foundered in the Irish Sea off Dungarvan, County Waterford with the loss of all hands. She was on a voyage from Terceira, Azores, Portugal to Liverpool, Lancashire.
Hurrell	United Kingdom	The ship was abandoned in the Atlantic Ocean. Her crew were rescued by Sandwich Packet (United Kingdom). Hurrell was on a voyage from Lisbon, Portugal to Teignmouth, Devon. She was taken in to Luanco, Spain on 31 December.
Jane	United Kingdom	The brig was driven ashore at Cobh.
Lapwing	United Kingdom	The ship ran aground and sank at Great Yarmouth, Norfolk. Her crew were rescued. She was on a voyage from Newcastle upon Tyne, Northumberland to Great Yarmouth.
Leod	(United Kingdom of Great Britain and Ireland) Turks Islands	The ship was abandoned whilst on a voyage from the Turks Islands to Campobello, South Carolina, United States.
Louisa	United Kingdom	The sloop was driven ashore at Cobh.
Repute	United Kingdom	The sloop was driven ashore and severely damaged at Cobh.
Samuel and Watkin	United Kingdom	The ship was off the Tuskar Rock on this date whilst on a voyage from Waterford to Newport Monmouthshire. No further trace, presumed foundered in the Irish Sea with the loss of all hands.
Sylvester Healy	United States	The ship was driven ashore on Gardiners Island, New York. She was on a voyage from Saint John, New Brunswick, British North America to New York City.
Union	United Kingdom	The schooner was driven ashore at Cobh.
William	United Kingdom	The ship was lost on Wigtown Bay with the loss of her captain. She was on a voyage from Balbriggan, County Dublin to Whitehaven, Cumberland.

== 20 December ==
List of shipwrecks: 20 December 1825
Ship	State	Description
Barton	United Kingdom	The ship foundered in the Irish Sea off Garryriske, County Waterford.
Bolton	United Kingdom	The ship was wrecked in Tramore Bay with the loss of all hands.
Catherine	United Kingdom	The ship was driven ashore in Whiting Bay. She was on a voyage from Youghall, County Cork to Newport, Monmouthshire. She was refloated on 22 December.
Esther	United Kingdom	The ship was driven ashore at Dungarvan, County Antrim. She was on a voyage from California to Liverpool, Lancashire.
Flora	United Kingdom	The schooner capsized in Tramore Bay with the loss of all hands.
Fruhling	Danzig	The ship was wrecked at Danzig.
Lady Hamilton	United Kingdom	The brig was wrecked at Gibraltar.
Lapwing	United Kingdom	The ship sank at Great Yarmouth, Norfolk. Her crew were rescued. She was on a voyage from Newcastle upon Tyne, Northumberland to Great Yarmouth.
Royal Oak	United Kingdom	The ship was driven ashore in Tramore Bay. Her crew were rescued. She was on a voyage from Youghall, County Cork to Dungarvon.
William	United Kingdom	The brig was driven ashore and wrecked at Cruggleton Castle, Wigtownshire with the loss of one of her five crew. She was on a voyage from Balbriggan, County Dublin to Workington, Cumberland.

== 21 December ==
List of shipwrecks: 21 December 1825
Ship	State	Description
City	United Kingdom	The ship departed from Dublin for Glasgow, Renfrewshire. No further trace, presumed foundered in the Irish Sea with the loss of all hands.
Elizabeth	United Kingdom	The ship was abandoned in the Atlantic Ocean. All on board were rescued by Elizabeth (France). She was on a voyage from London to Gibraltar.
Endeavour	United Kingdom	The ship was driven ashore and wrecked at Ballyroney, County Down with the loss of all but two of her crew. She was on a voyage from Cork to Pwllheli, Caernarfonshire.
Industry	United Kingdom	The ship ran aground on the Newcombe Sand, in the North Sea off the coast of Norfolk. She was refloated and beached at Great Yarmouth, where she was wrecked the next day.
Resolution	United Kingdom	The ship was driven ashore near Figueira da Foz, Portugal. She had been refloated by 25 December.
Thomas Peele	United Kingdom	The ship was driven ashore at Tacumshane, County Wexford. She was on a voyage from Quebec City, Lower Canada, British North America to Liverpool, Lancashire.

== 22 December ==
List of shipwrecks: 22 December 1825
Ship	State	Description
Britannia	United Kingdom	The ship was driven ashore and wrecked at Ballycotton, County Cork with the loss of all but her captain.
Elizabeth	United Kingdom	The ship was driven ashore at Ballycotton. Her crew were rescued. She was on a voyage from Youghall, County Cork to Newport, Monmouthshire.

== 23 December ==
List of shipwrecks: 23 December 1825
Ship	State	Description
Amity	United Kingdom	The ship ran aground on the Goodwin Sands, Kent. She was on a voyage from Sunderland, County Durham to Portsmouth, Hampshire. She was refloated the next day and taken in to Ramsgate, Kent.
Fleetwood	United Kingdom	The ship ran aground on the Goodwin Sands. She was on a voyage from Newcastle upon Tyne, Northumberland to Jamaica. She was refloated the next day and anchored in The Downs.
Hamilton or Humility	United Kingdom	The ship ran aground on the Goodwin Sands. She was on a voyage from Sunderland to Portsmouth. She was refloated the next day and taken in to Ramsgate.
John	United Kingdom	The ship ran aground on the Goodwin Sands. She was refloated the next day and taken in to Ramsgate.

== 24 December ==
List of shipwrecks: 24 December 1825
Ship	State	Description
Rambler	United Kingdom	The ship was driven ashore at Ballywalter, County Antrim. She was on a voyage from Belfast, County Antrim to Dublin.Rambler was later refloated.
Royal George	British East India Company	The East Indiaman was destroyed by fire at a Chinese port. Her crew were rescued.
Thetford	United Kingdom	The ship was driven ashore on Walcheren, Zeeland, Netherlands. Her crew were rescued. She was on a voyage from Hull, Yorkshire to Rotterdam, South Holland, Netherlands. She was refloated on 29 January 1826.

== 25 December ==
List of shipwrecks: 25 December 1825
Ship	State	Description
Ann	United Kingdom	The schooner struck a rock and was beached at Nigg, Ross-shire, where she was subsequently wrecked.
Bell	United Kingdom	The collier was wrecked on the Newcombe Sand, in the North Sea off Great Yarmouth, Norfolk. Her crew were rescued. She was on a voyage from South Shields, County Durham to London. Bell drifted off on 1 January 1826 and collided with the Newcombe Lightship ( Trinity House).
Friends	United Kingdom	The ship was wrecked at Whitby, Yorkshire. Her crew were rescued. She was on a voyage from Gainsborough, Lincolnshire to Newcastle upon Tyne, Northumberland.
Harmony	United Kingdom	The ship struck the Whale's Back, in the Atlantic Ocean off Portsmouth, New Hampshire, United States and sank. She was on a voyage from Liverpool, Lancashire to Portsmouth.
Herring	United Kingdom	The ship was driven ashore at Great Yarmouth. Her crew were rescued by rocket apparatus. She was on a voyage from Sunderland, County Durham to Great Yarmouth.
Maria & Harriet	United Kingdom	The ship was destroyed by fire at Ceará, Brazil.

== 26 December ==
List of shipwrecks: 26 December 1825
Ship	State	Description
Herring	United Kingdom	The ship was driven ashore at Great Yarmouth, Norfolk. Her crew were rescued by rocket apparatus. She was on a voyage from Sunderland, County Durham to Great Yarmouth.
Union	United Kingdom	The ship was beached at Lisbon, Portugal. She was on a voyage from Seville, Spain to London.

== 27 December ==
List of shipwrecks: 27 December 1825
Ship	State	Description
Albion	United Kingdom	The ship was abandoned in the Irish Sea off Great Orme Head, Caernarfonshire. Two of her six crew were presumed to have drowned. She was on a voyage from Dublin to Liverpool, Lancashire.

== 28 December ==
List of shipwrecks: 28 December 1825
Ship	State	Description
Mary	United Kingdom	The ship was abandoned in the Atlantic Ocean. She was on a voyage from Berbice to Halifax, Nova Scotia, British North America.

== 30 December ==
List of shipwrecks: 30 December 1825
Ship	State	Description
Fanny	United Kingdom	The ship was driven ashore on Lambay Island, County Dublin. She was on a voyage from Whitehaven, Cumberland to Dublin. Fanny was later refloated and taken in to Kingstown, County Dublin.
Friendship	United Kingdom	The ship was driven ashore at Freshwater, Isle of Wight. She was on a voyage from Dublin to London. Friendship was refloated on 1 January 1826 and take in to Cowes, Isle of Wight.
Halifax Packet	United Kingdom	The ship struck a rock and was wrecked at North Queensferry, Lothian. Her crew were rescued. She was on a voyage from Charleston, Forfarshire to Aberdeen.
Jane	United Kingdom	The brig was discovered abandoned on this date. She had been on a voyage from Alvarado, Veracruz to Campeche City, Mexico.
Johanna Sophia	Sweden	The ship ran aground on the Nidings.
Mary Ann	United Kingdom	The ship was wrecked on Skokholm, Pembrokeshire. She was on a voyage from Newport, Monmouthshire to Dublin.
Nouvelle Eugene	France	The ship departed from St. Thomas, Virgin Islands for Havre de Grâce, Seine-Inférieure. No further trace, presumed foundered with the loss of all hands.

== Unknown date ==
List of shipwrecks: Unknown date in December 1825
Ship	State	Description
Adele	France	The brig was wrecked on Sandy Key, off the Bahamas.
Andoriñha de Tejo	Portugal	The ship was lost in the Pará River.
Banon	United Kingdom	The ship was driven ashore and wrecked at Great Yarmouth, Norfolk on or before 13 December.
Brothers	United Kingdom	The ship was abandoned in the Atlantic Ocean. She was on a voyage from Quebec City, Lower Canada, British North America to Dublin. Brothers was later towed in to Cobh, County Cork by HMS Victor (Royal Navy). She arrived on 15 March 1826.
Bruce	United Kingdom	The brig struck rocks and sank off Stromstad, Sweden with the loss of all hands.
Caledonia	United Kingdom	The ship was driven ashore on the Point of Ness, Orkney Islands. She was on a voyage from Riga, Russia to Leith, Lothian. Caledonia was refloated on 16 December and taken in to Stromness, Orkney Islands.
Canadian	United Kingdom	The ship was wrecked on L'Isle-aux-Coudres, Quebec City. She was on a voyage from Quebec City to London.
Caroline	United Kingdom	The ship was driven ashore at Malin Head, County Donegal. Her crew were rescued. She was on a voyage from Liverpool, Lancashire to Limerick.
Christina den Forst	Denmark	The ship was driven ashore on Skagen.
Effort	United Kingdom	The ship was wrecked off Langlee Island, Massachusetts, United States. She was on a voyage from Quebec to Saint John, New Brunswick, British North America.
Elisa Wilhelmina	Netherlands	The ship was wrecked at La Tremblade, Charente-Maritime, France. She was on a voyage from Bordeaux, Gironde, France to Antwerp.
Eliza & Peggy	United Kingdom	The ship was driven ashore near Nairn. She was on a voyage from Great Yarmouth to Nairn.
Flora	United Kingdom	The ship was driven ashore and damaged near Málaga, Spain. She was on a voyage from Adra, Spain to Liverpool. Flora was later refloated and put into Málaga, where she arrived on 14 December.
Friendship	United Kingdom	The ship was lost near Campbeltown, Argyllshire in early December with the loss of three of her crew. She was on a voyage from Irvine, Ayrshire to Newry, County Antrim.
Hancock	United Kingdom	The ship was driven ashore at Marstrand, Sweden before 10 December.
Harmonia	United Kingdom	The ship was wrecked off Bornholm, Denmark.
Industry	United Kingdom	The ship was driven ashore and wrecked at Lowestoft, suffolk.
Jane	United Kingdom	The ship was driven ashore on Dragør, Denmark before 10 December. She was on a voyage from Danzig to Dundee, Forfarshire.
Jeune Henri	France	The ship was wrecked.
Jonge Hendrik	Netherlands	The ship was wrecked whilst on a voyage from Madeira to Bordeaux. Her crew were rescued.
Joseph	United Kingdom	The ship was abandoned in the North Sea off Great Yarmouth, Norfolk. She was on a voyage from Saint Petersburg, Russia to Liverpool.
Juniata	United Kingdom	The ship was wrecked on The Skerries, Anglesey. She was on a voyage from Liverpool to Java.
Latona	United Kingdom	The ship was lost at Marstrand, Sweden.
Lady Juliana	United Kingdom	The ship was driven ashore at Falsterbo, Sweden before 6 December. She was on a voyage from Riga, Russia to London. Lady Juliana was later refloated.
Margaret	United Kingdom	The ship was lost on the Isle of Man in early December with the loss of four of her crew. She was on a voyage from Newry, County Antrim to Liverpool, Lancashire.
Maria	United Kingdom	The ship was lost at Newfoundland). Her crew were rescued.
Mary	United Kingdom	The ship was driven ashore on Pladda, off the Isle of Arran. She was on a voyage from Miramichi, New Brunswick, British North America to the Clyde. She had been refloated by 13 December.
Morgenster	Netherlands	The ship was wrecked on the coast of Jutland. She was on a voyage from Riga, Russia to Antwerp.
Neptunus	Sweden	The ship was driven ashore on Skagen, Denmark. She was on a voyage from Kristianstad to Belfast, County Antrim.
Nordstern	Danzig	The ship was wrecked near Arundal, Norway. She was on a voyage from Danzig to London.
Paquete do Maranhão	Brazil	The ship was lost in the Pará River at Vigia.
Paris	United Kingdom	The ship was wrecked on the Goodwin Sands, Kent. She was on a voyage from Limerick to London.
Renard	France	The ship was wrecked whilst on a voyage from Saint Petersburg to Bordeaux.
Richard	United Kingdom	The ship was lost in the Cattegat in early December. Her crew were rescued. She was on a voyage from Kiel, Duchy of Holstein to Hull, Yorkshire.
Tranby	United Kingdom	The ship was driven ashore on Dragør, Denmark on or before 7 December. She was on a voyage from Saint Petersburg to London
Vier Gebroeders	Netherlands	The ship foundered in the North Sea off the coast of Friesland.
William	United Kingdom	The West Indiaman ran aground off Læsø, Denmark before 10 December.
