= Leek (disambiguation) =

A leek is a vegetable belonging to the onion family.

Leek may also refer to:

== Places ==
- Leek, Netherlands
- Leek, Staffordshire, England
  - Leek (UK Parliament constituency)
  - Leek College, a further education college now named Buxton & Leek College
- Mount Leek, Palmer Land, Antarctica
- Leek Wootton, Warwickshire, England

== Other uses ==
- Leek (surname)

== See also ==
- Leak (disambiguation)
- Leeke (disambiguation)
- Leake (disambiguation)
