= Leak (disambiguation) =

A leak is a way for matter to escape a container.

Leak may also refer to: showing parts of something which is not released yet

== Information leaks ==
- News leak, the unsanctioned release of confidential information to news media
- Data leak
  - Internet leak, a release of confidential information on the Internet
  - Music leak, the unauthorized release of music on the Internet

== People ==
- Leak (surname), a list of people with the family name Leak or Leaks

== Arts, entertainment, and media ==
=== Films ===
- Leak (film), a 2000 Dutch thriller
- The Leak (1917, short film), directed by William Beaudine with Billy Franey, Milburn Morante, Lillian Peacock

=== Music ===
- The Leak (2007), a recording by hip hop artist Lil Wayne
- The Leak, an album by Blades (hip hop group)
- The Leaks (2025), a mixtape by Lil Baby

== Other uses ==
- LEAK, a brand name for high-fidelity audio equipment
- Leak, a slang term for the drug phencyclidine (PCP)
- Leak, a slang term for urination
- Memory leak, incorrect allocation of computer memory

== See also ==
- Leak detection
- Leyak, mythological figure in Balinese mythology
- Leakage (disambiguation)
- Leake (disambiguation)
- Leek (disambiguation)
