= Leakage =

A leakage occurs when fluid is lost through a leak.

Leakage may also refer to:

- Leakage (chemistry), a process in which material is lost through holes or defects in containers
- Leakage (economics)
  - Carbon leakage or emissions leakage, whereby another country increases its greenhouse gas emissions in response to a unilateral climate policy
- Leakage (electronics)
  - Leakage (electric current), an occurrence of electric current through a surface which is supposed to be insulating
  - Crosstalk (electronics), also known as Leakage, where signals are picked up by an unintended device
  - Spill (audio), where audio from one source is picked up by a microphone intended for a different source
- Leakage (machine learning)
- Leakage (retail)
- Leakage effect, the loss of tourist revenue from a country
- Memory leak, in computer science
- Spectral leakage, in signal processing

== Similar uses ==
- Extravasation
- Fecal incontinence
- Urinary incontinence

== See also ==
- Leak (disambiguation)
