= Leake =

Leake may refer to:

== Places ==
- Old Leake and New Leake, Lincolnshire, UK
- West Leake and East Leake, Nottinghamshire, UK
- Leake, North Yorkshire, UK
- Leake County, Mississippi, United States
- Lake Leake, Tasmania, Australia
- Leake Mounds, archaeological site in Georgia, United States

== People ==
- Alex Leake (1871-1938), English footballer for Small Heath, Aston Villa, and Burnley
- Arthur Martin-Leake (1874–1953), awarded two Victoria Crosses
- Bernard Elgey Leake (b. 1932), British geologist
- Damien Leake (b. 1952), American actor and masters athlete
- George Leake (1856–1902), Australian politician
- Hugh Martin-Leake (1878–1977), British economic botanist
- Javon Leake (b. 1998), American football player
- John Leake (disambiguation), several people
- Joseph Bloomfield Leake (1828–1918), American Civil War Brevet Brigadier General and U.S. District Attorney for the Northern District of Illinois
- Mike Leake (b. 1987), a baseball player
- Walter Leake (1769–1825), US politician
- William Leake (disambiguation), several people
- Willie Mae James Leake (1932–1997), American politician

== See also ==
- Leak (disambiguation)
