= East Runton =

Village in Norfolk, England

Coordinates: 52.94°N 1.24°E

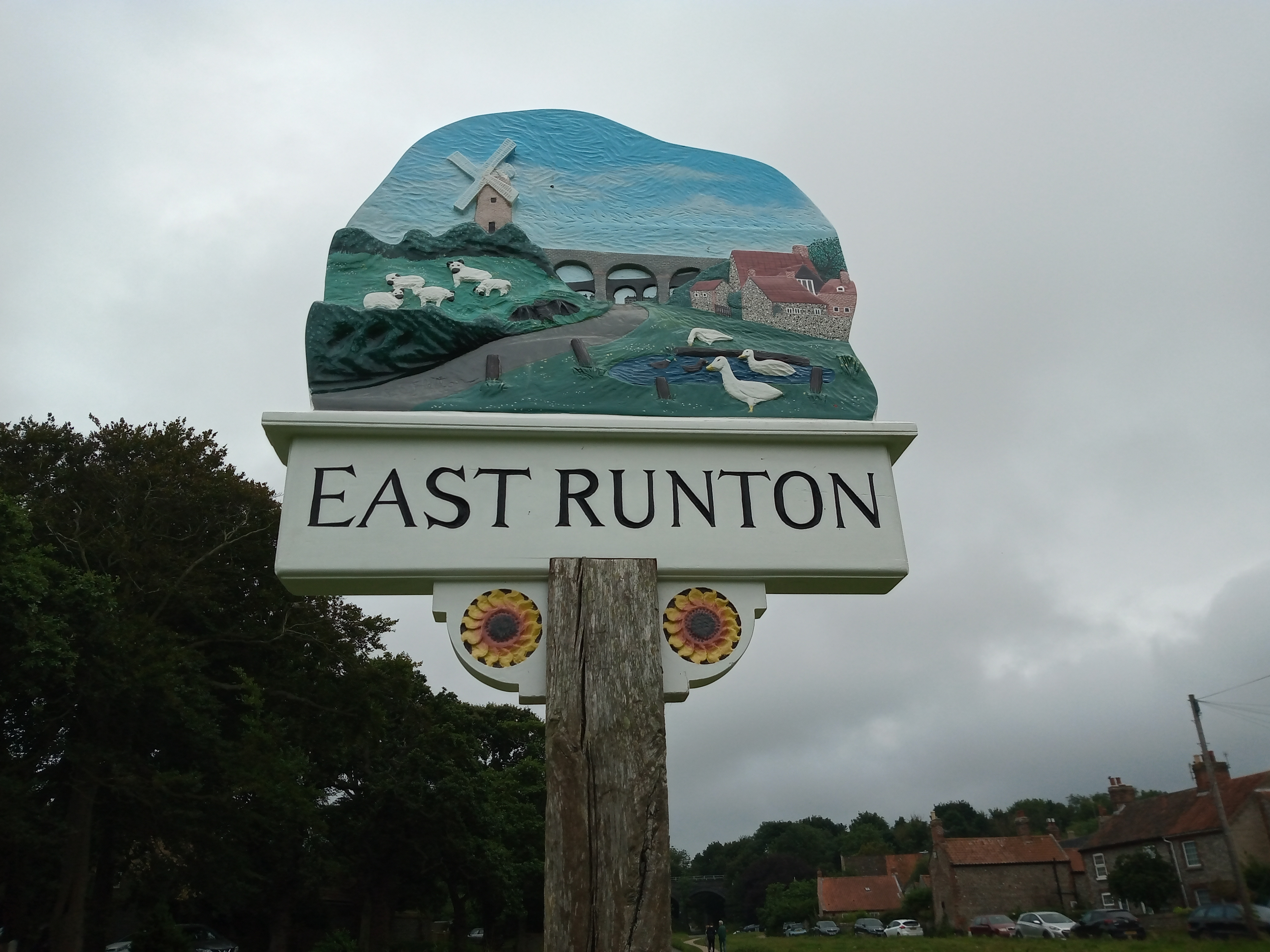
- East Runton village sign

- Location within Norfolk
- OS grid reference: TG197425
- Civil parish: Runton
- District: North Norfolk
- Shire county: Norfolk
- Region: East
- Country: England
- Sovereign state: United Kingdom
- Post town: CROMER
- Postcode district: NR27
- Dialling code: 01263
- Police: Norfolk
- Fire: Norfolk
- Ambulance: East of England
- UK Parliament: North Norfolk

East Runton is a village in the civil parish of Runton in the English county of Norfolk.

East Runton is located 1.3 miles (2.1 km) west of Cromer and 21.7 miles (34.9 km) north of Norwich. The village lies on the A149 coast road but most of the dwellings can be found just south of the road, nestled around the two village greens.

== History ==
East Runton's name is of Anglo-Saxon origin and derives from the Old English for Runa's or Runi's settlement.

In the Domesday Book, East Runton is listed alongside West Runton as a settlement of 24 households in the hundred of North Erpingham. In 1086, the village was divided between the East Anglian estates of Roger Bigod and William d'Ecouis.

East Runton Windmill was first recorded in 1826 and was in operation until the machinery was removed in 1949, with the mill later being converted into a private residence.

== Geography ==
East Runton's population statistics are shared with that of West Runton. According to the 2021 census, Runton has a population of 1,524 people which shows a decrease from the 1,667 people recorded in the 2011 census.

East Runton sits on the A149, between King's Lynn and Great Yarmouth.

== Public houses ==
There are two public houses in East Runton: the Fishing Boat and the White Horse Inn. The Fishing Boat is the older of the inns, and is on the tithe map of 1840, although it was simply called the ‘Boat Inn’ then. In 1734 it is recorded that a court was held at the inn and it was then called the ‘Three Horse Shoes’. The White Horse Inn is first recorded in 1851. There is also a social club in the village which is known as ‘Bernies’ Corner House in Beach Road which in years prior was an amusement arcade but this changed to current usage in around 1987. Bernie's was named after Bernie Parkin whose father Reginald (Snr) originally had bought the place and had run it as an amusement arcade. Next door is a fish and chip shop. This was run for some time (especially during the 1980s) by John Parkin (Bernie's brother).

== Story of James Leak ==
James Leak was a resident of East Runton around the early part of the 19th century. Leak was the local blacksmith and renowned Bare-Knuckle prize fighter. He lived in one of six thatched cottages that once stood on the cliff top near Runton gap. His blacksmith's forge was at East Runton. In 1827 Leak had a big problem. The story goes that he had developed a gangrenous toe and was in fear of it spreading and causing his death. In his desperation, Leak came up with his own solution to his problem. He went to his forge in East Runton, rested his foot on his anvil and with one mighty blow removed the infected toe with a hammer and chisel. He then cauterized the stump with a red hot poker from out of his forge. This desperate surgery had been as a consequence of Leak being unable to afford surgeon's fees. He made a full recovery and his home surgery seems to have had little effect on the man as he continued his prize-fighting and lived to the age of 82.

== Surfing ==
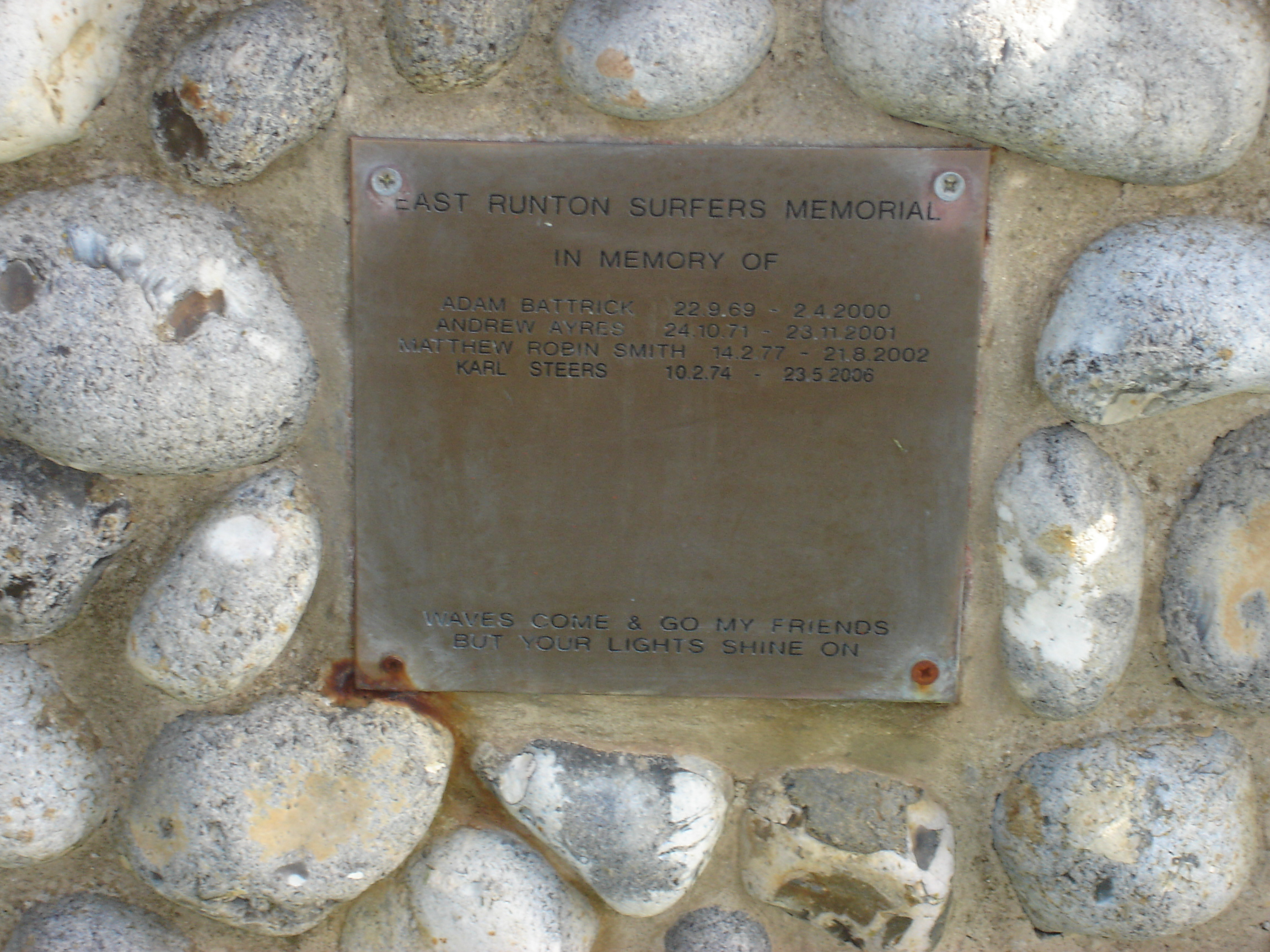
Surfers' memorial plaque

The beach at East Runton is popular with the surfing fraternity. Located on a cliff-top, the Surfers' Memorial was unveiled in 2003. The weather vane is topped with a figure depicting a surfer. At the base of the memorial a plaque commemorating the lives of four young surfers is inscribed with the words Waves come & go my friends but your lights shine on .

== Governance ==
East Runton is part of the electoral ward of Beeston Regis & The Runtons for local elections and is part of the district of North Norfolk.

The village's national constituency is North Norfolk, which has been represented by the Liberal Democrat Steff Aquarone MP since 2024.

== War Memorial ==
East and West Runton War Memorial is a flint memorial with marble plaques located close to the Church of the Holy Trinity in West Runton. The funds for the memorial were raised between 1919 and 1921 with the memorial being erected by the Sheringham-based stonemason, H. Palmer. The memorial was unveiled in 1921 and re-furbished in 1951. The memorial lists the following names of residents from East Runton:

Rank	Name	Unit	Date of death	Burial/Commemoration
2Lt.	George H. Clarke	3rd Bn., Norfolk Regiment	21 Apr. 1918	Tannay Cemetery
Sgt.	Frank W. Bird	1/5th Bn., Norfolk Regiment	19 Apr.1917	Jerusalem Memorial
Sgt.	Archibald Hastings	1/5th Bn., Norfolk Regt.	19 Apr. 1917	Jerusalem Memorial
Sgt.	Timothy Gibbons MM	8th Bn., Norfolk Regt.	19 Jul. 1916	Thiepval Memorial
LCpl.	Leslie C. Fisher	11th Bn., Royal Sussex Regiment	21 Oct. 1916	Mill Road Cemetery
Pte.	James W. Dennis	8th Coy., Army Service Corps	21 Feb. 1919	Abbeville Cemetery
Pte.	Robert L. Cooper	1st Bn., Bedfordshire Regiment	20 Jul. 1918	Ploegsteert Memorial
Pte.	Arthur W. Hancock	2nd Bn., Bedfordshire Regt.	30 Jun. 1918	Pozieres Memorial
Pte.	John Field	16th (Canadian Scottish) Bn., CEF	2 Sep. 1918	Dominion Cemetery
Pte.	Fred Line	20th Bn., Durham Light Infantry	4 Sep. 1918	Tyne Cot
Pte.	George T. Crask	2nd Bn., Royal Fusiliers	28 Feb. 1917	Thiepval Memorial
Pte.	Horace Creasey	1st Bn., Norfolk Regiment	28 Oct. 1917	Tyne Cot
Pte.	James W. Todd	2nd Bn., Norfolk Regt.	8 Apr. 1917	Basra War Memorial
Pte.	Frederick W. Brown	1/5th Bn., Norfolk Regt.	19 Apr. 1917	Gaza War Cemetery
Pte.	Robert Lines	1/5th Bn., Norfolk Regt.	21 Aug. 1915	Helles Memorial
Pte.	M. Robert Abbs	8th Bn., Norfolk Regt.	11 Aug. 1917	The Huts Cemetery
Pte.	Ernest W. Baker	8th Bn., Norfolk Regt.	2 Jul. 1916	Daours Cemetery
Pte.	Gordon L. Porritt	8th Bn., Norfolk Regt.	19 May 1917	Arras Memorial
Pte.	George C. Hurrell	1st Bn., Northamptonshire Regiment	20 Jul. 1916	Thiepval Memorial
Pte.	Arthur W. Craske	14th Bn., Northumberland Fusiliers	23 Oct. 1917	Lijssenthoek Cemetery
Pte.	William H. Williams	1st Bn., Queen's Royal Regiment	31 Oct. 1914	Menin Gate
Pte.	William F. Balls	9th Bn., West Yorkshire Regiment	9 Oct. 1917	Cement House Cemetery
Pte.	Fredrick Fisher	1/7th Bn., Worcestershire Regiment	31 Oct. 1918	Barenthal Cemetery
By1C	Sydney G. Abbs	HMS Natal	30 Dec. 1915	Chatham Naval Memorial

In 1951, the following names of soldiers from East Runton who died during the Second World War were added:

Rank	Name	Unit	Date of death	Burial/Commemoration
Col.	Edward K. Steward	Command, Royal Corps of Signals	24 Jul. 1945	Taukkyan War Cemetery
Sgn. Lt.	Geoffrey S. Cross	HMS Anking	21 Mar. 1942	Plymouth Naval Memorial
FSgt.	Ronald J. Lusher	No. 221 Squadron RAF	6 Dec. 1942	Alamein Memorial
AS	Reginald J. Gray	HMS Hasty	15 Jun. 1942	Chatham Naval Memorial
LCpl.	James R. Lake	Royal Army Service Corps	14 Jul. 1942	Asmara War Cemetery
A2C	Lawrence H. Trumay	No. 209 Squadron RAF	20 Feb. 1940	Runnymede Memorial
Pte.	Douglas A. Shales	Royal Army Ordnance Corps	13 Feb. 1942	Kranji War Memorial
Pte.	Frank R. Gray	2nd Bn., Royal Norfolk Regiment	27 May 1940	Le Paradis Cemetery
Pte.	Arthur E. Barker	5th Bn., Royal Norfolk Regt.	21 Sep. 1944	Kranji War Memorial
Spr.	Kenneth A. Balls	6 MC Group, Royal Engineers	17 Jun. 1940	Dunkirk Memorial

The memorial also lists the name of a 12 year old girl, Doris Emma King, who was killed on a bombing raid on Cromer on 17 November 1940.

== Notable people ==
- Ivison Macadam, founder-president of the National Union of Students

== See also ==
- West Runton

== Gallery ==
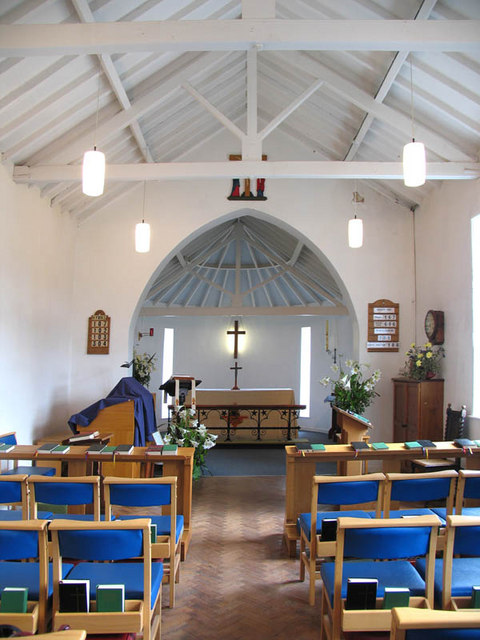
St. Andrew's Church, East Runton

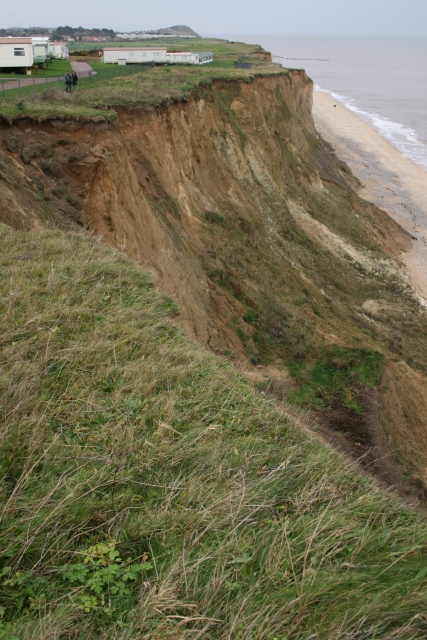
Looking towards Sheringham

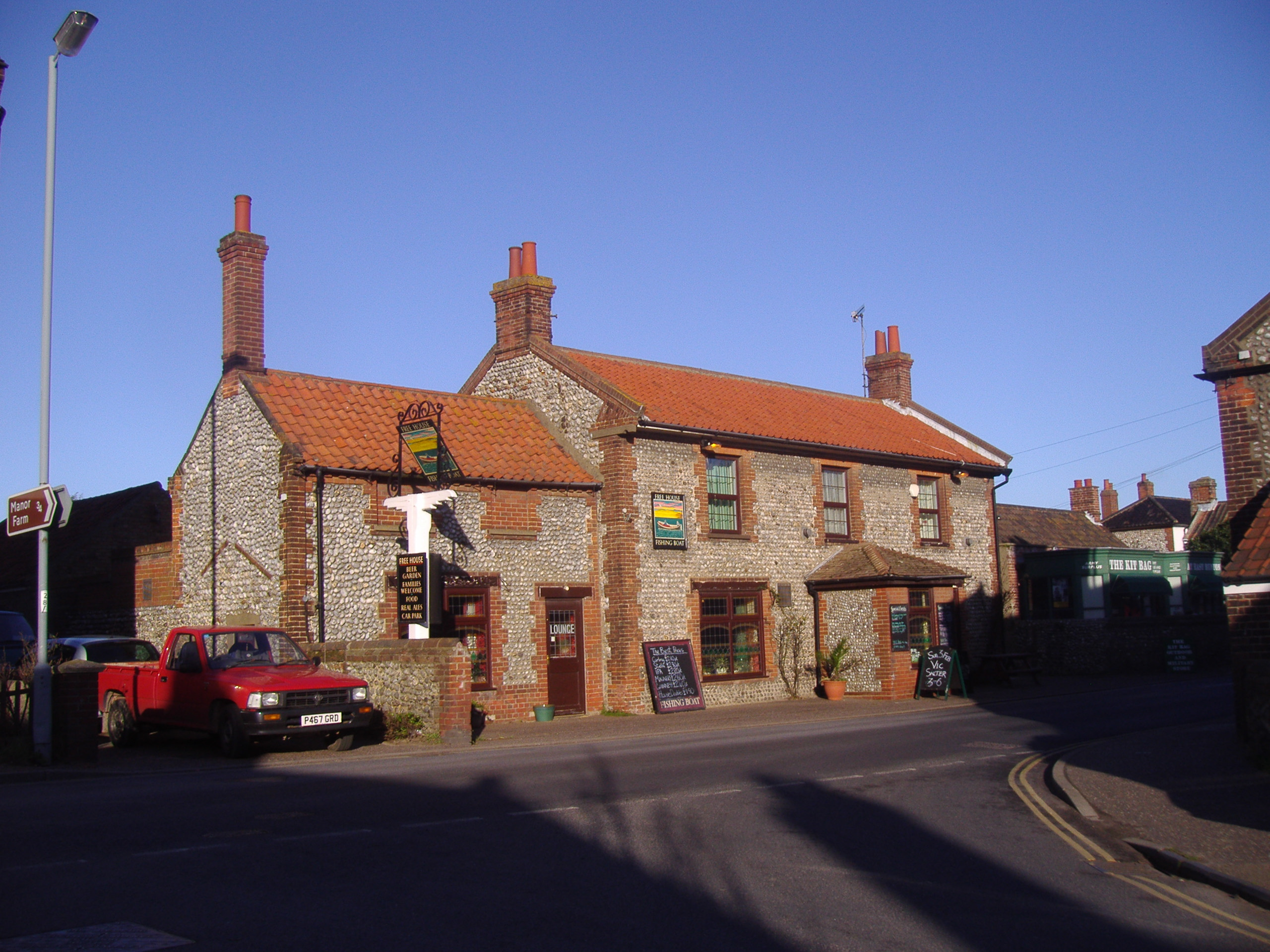
The Fishing Boat Inn

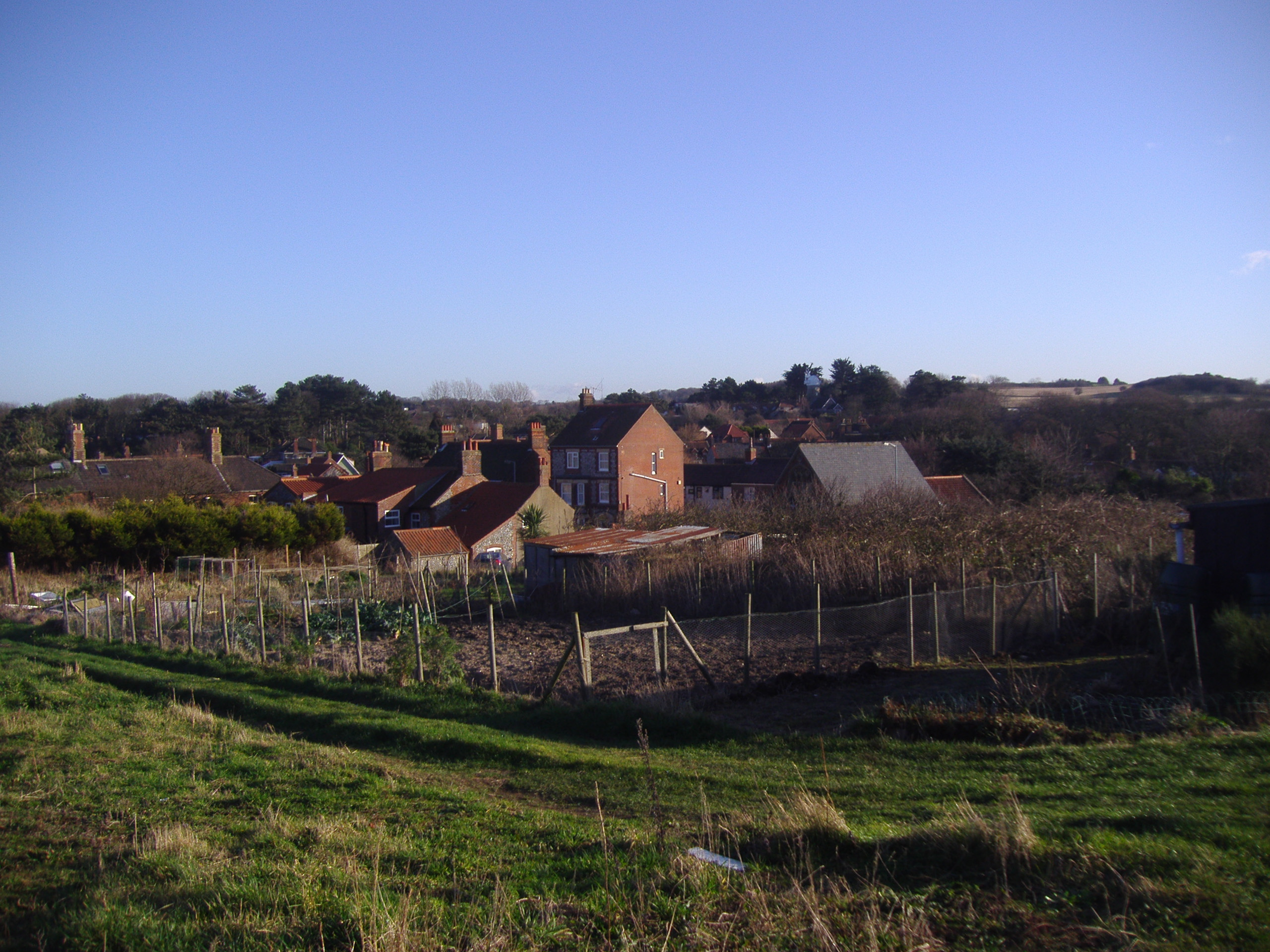
View into East Runton from the north-west

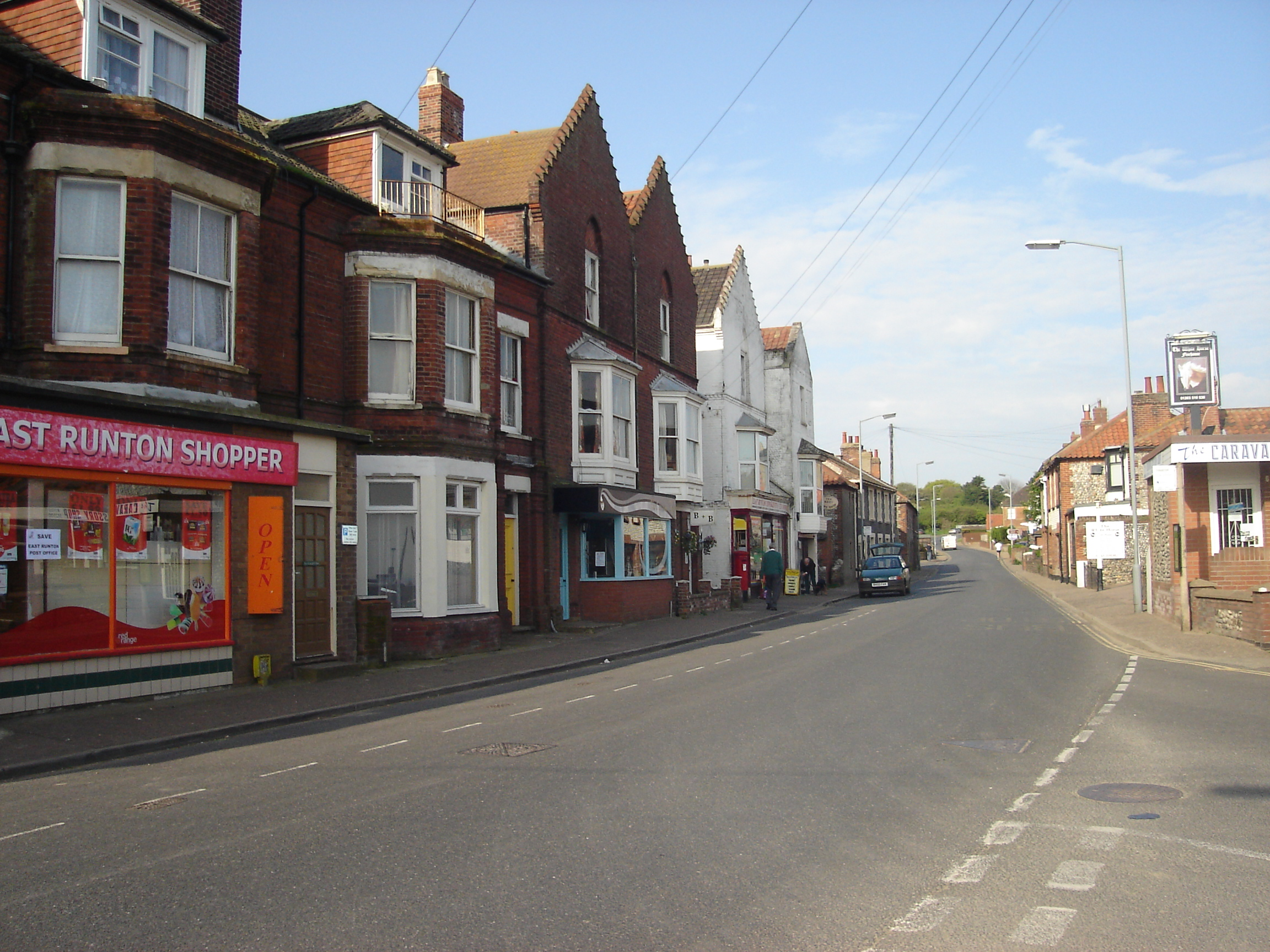
A149 passing through the village
