= Leak (surname) =

Leak or Leaks is the surname of:

Leak:

- Bill Leak (1956–2017), Australian cartoonist and painter, father of Johannes Leak
- Bill Leak (sportsman) (1917–2007), Australian rules footballer and cricketer
- Bruce Leak, American inventor and entrepreneur
- Chris Leak (born 1985), American former football quarterback
- Hector Leak (1887–1976), British statistician
- James Leak, 19th century English bare-knuckle prize fighter
- Johannes Leak (born 1980), Australian cartoonist and painter, son of Bill Leak
- John Leak (1892–1972), Australian First World War recipient of the Victoria Cross
- Maysa Leak (born 1966), American jazz singer better known simply as Maysa

Leaks:

- Manny Leaks (born 1945), American Basketball Association and National Basketball Association player
- Roosevelt Leaks (born 1953), African-American college football and National Football League player, member of the College Football Hall of Fame

== See also ==
- Leek (surname)
