= Emperor Alexander (1813 Chepstow ship) =

History

United Kingdom
- Name: Emperor Alexander
- Namesake: Emperor Alexander I
- Builder: Chepstow
- Launched: 1813
- Fate: Condemned 22 May 1835

General characteristics
- Tons burthen: 360, or 366, or 36666/94, or 368 (bm)
- Length: 107 ft 8 in (32.8 m)
- Beam: 27 ft 8 in (8.4 m)

Emperor Alexander was launched in 1813 at Chepstow. Relatively early in her career she made two voyages to India and the East Indies under a license from the British East India Company (EIC). On her return she became a West Indiaman, and also sailed to South America, North America, and the Baltic. She carried immigrants to Quebec and transported convicts to Tasmania. She was condemned in 1835 following damage at sea on her way to the Cape and India.

== Career ==
Emperor Alexander first appeared in Lloyd's Register in 1816 with Chapman, master, Boux, owner, and trade London-Batavia.

In 1813 the EIC had lost its monopoly on the trade between India and Britain. British ships were then free to sail to India or the Indian Ocean and the East Indies under a license from the EIC. Her owners applied for a licence on 13 January 1816 and received one on 17 January.

On 3 January 1816 Captain T. Chapman sailed Emperor Alexander to Fort William, India under a licence from the EIC.

On 25 January 1817 Captain Butler sailed Emperor Alexander to Fort William. On 30 August 1818 she arrived back at Deal from Bengal. She had left Bencoolen on 16 April and Saint Helena on 11 July.

Year	Master	Owner	Trade	Source & notes
1818	J.A.Butler; Milne	J. Bowsher & Co.	London–India; London–Jamaica	LR
1820	Milne	Captain&Co. Bryce	London–Jamaica	LR

On 21 July 1821 Emperor Alexander, Milne, master, was near the Cayman Islands on her way from Jamaica back to London when she sighted two Buenos Ayrean privateers with three prizes in company: an American ship, a Danish ship, and a Dutch brig. One of the privateers was Mars, of 16 guns and 175 men. Mars had been out four months and reportedly had taken 16 prizes.

Year	Master	Owner	Trade	Source & notes
1825	Armstrong	J.Moates	Liverpool–Rio de Janeiro	LR

On 22 November 1825 Emperor Alexander put into Gothenburg. She had been on her way from Danzig to London when she became leaky and her cargo shifted. She would have to unload to effect repairs. On 18 December as she was on her way from Danzig and Gothenburg, Emperor Alexander grounded near the entrance to the harbour at Elsinor during a fog. She was gotten off and was expected to proceed.

In late 1825 or early 1826, Emperor Alexander, Armstrong, master rescued part of Rosella's crew and the members of Severn's crew aboard Rosella. Rosella had been driven ashore and wrecked on Bornholm, Denmark. Prior to wrecking, Rosella had picked up the crew of Severn, which had become waterlogged. Emperor Alexander had great difficulty rescuing the crews, having to use ropes to haul them individually to shore over the rocks. She rescued eight members of Rosella's crew; the other 12 chose to remain on Bornholm to take care of the wreck and to await another vessel that might bring them home. Off Flamborough Head, Emperor Alexander encountered the brig Henry and William, of Aberdeen, Allan, master and transferred the rescued men to her. Henry and William delivered them to Aberdeen on 17 January 1826.

Year	Master	Owner	Trade	Source & notes
1826	Armstrong; Davison	J.Moates	London–New Brunswick	LR
1830	S.Davidson	J.Moates	Liverpool–Quebec	LR

On 28 June 1832 Emperor Alexander, Boag (or Boig), master, sailed from London. She delivered 161 settlers to Quebec on 29 August. The passengers included English architect John G. Howard and his wife Jemima Howard, who settled in Toronto and later founded one of the city's major parks, High Park.

Convict transport: On 10 April 1833 Captain John Hurst sailed from Sheerness with convicts, a detachment of troops (two officers and 29 rank-and-file), and their dependents (eight women and nine children), and a doctor from the Royal Navy. She delivered her passengers to Hobart Town on 12 August. She had embarked 210 convicts and she landed 209, having suffered one convict death en route.

== Fate ==
Year	Master	Owner	Trade	Source & notes
1835	J.Hurst	W.Ive	London–Bombay	LR; thorough repair 1832

On 19 May 1835 Emperor Alexander was badly damaged by bad weather on passage from London for the Cape of Good Hope. She arrived at Cape Town on the 22nd. There she was surveyed, condemned as a constructive total loss, and sold for breaking up.
