= Runton =

Civil parish in Norfolk, England

Coordinates: 52.9333°N 1.25°E

- Location within Norfolk
- Area: 5.44 km^{2} (2.10 sq mi)
- Population: 1,667 (2011)
  - Density: 306/km^{2} (790/sq mi)
- OS grid reference: TG185422
- Civil parish: Runton
- District: North Norfolk
- Shire county: Norfolk
- Region: East
- Country: England
- Sovereign state: United Kingdom
- Post town: CROMER
- Postcode district: NR27
- Police: Norfolk
- Fire: Norfolk
- Ambulance: East of England

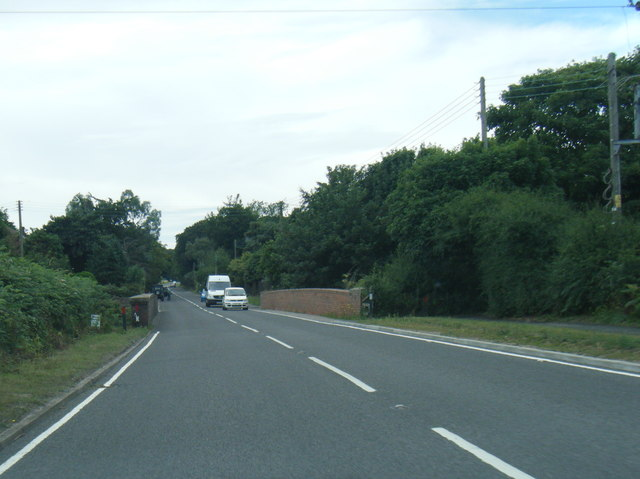
A-148 railway bridge (near Cromer)

Runton is a civil parish in the English county of Norfolk consisting of the villages of East Runton and West Runton. It covers an area of 5.44 km^{2} (2.10 sq mi) and had a population of 1,633 in 784 households at the 2001 census, the population increasing to 1,667 at the 2011 Census. For the purposes of local government, it falls within the district of North Norfolk.

The name 'Runton' means either, 'Runa's farm/settlement' or 'Runi's farm/settlement'.

== Governance ==
Runton falls in the electoral ward called The Runtons. This ward stretches south to Aylmerton and had a total population at the 2011 census of 2,125.
