= William Leake (disambiguation) =

William Leake father (died 1633) and son (died 1681) were London publishers and booksellers.

William Leake may also refer to:

- William Leake (rugby union) (1865–1942), England international rugby union player
- William Martin Leake (1777–1860), British antiquarian and topographer
- William Leake (died 1852) (c. 1771 – 1852), MP for Mitchell 1818–1820 and 1826–1830, and Malmesbury 1820–26
- William H. Leake (died 1892), American actor, died in Australia
- William J. Leake (1843–1908), Virginia lawyer, judge and railroad president
- William Walter Leake (1833–1912), officer in the Confederate States Army in the American Civil War
- William Leake (cricketer) (1831–1918), English civil engineer, tea planter and cricketer

== See also ==
- Billy Leake, rugby league fullback and centre who played for Bradford Northern in the 1940s
