= James Leak =

British bare-knuckle boxer

James Leak was a bare-knuckle prize fighter who was born in the county of Norfolk in the United Kingdom.

James Leak was a resident of East Runton, Norfolk around the early part of the 19th century. Leak was the local blacksmith and renowned bare-knuckle prize fighter. He lived in one of six thatched cottage that once stood on the cliff top near Runton gap. His blacksmith's forge was at West Runton.

In 1827 Leak had a big problem. The story goes that he had developed a gangrenous toe and was in fear of it spreading and would result in his death. In his desperation, Leak had come up with his own solution to his problem. He went to his forge in West Runton and rested his foot on his anvil and with one mighty blow removed the infected toe with a hammer and chisel. He then cauterized the stump with a red-hot poker from out of his forge. This desperate surgery by Leak had been as a consequence of Leak being unable to afford surgeon's fees. He made a full recovery and his home surgery seems to have had little effect on the man as he continued his prize-fighting and lived to the age of 82.
