= Leek (surname) =

Leek is a surname. In English, it is an alternative spelling of Leake. In Dutch, it is a topographical name for someone living near a water named leek, from the word leek meaning "border water". Notable people with the surname include:

- Andy Leek (born 1958), English musician
- Gene Leek (born 1936), American former baseball player
- Geoff Leek (1932–2008), Australian rules footballer
- John de Leche or de Leek, Archbishop of Dublin (1311-1311)
- Ken Leek (1935–2007), Welsh footballer
- Miranda Leek (born 1993), American archer
- Peter Leek (born 1988), Australian Paralympic swimmer
- Ralph Leek, American football player
- Stephen Leek (born 1959), Australian composer, conductor, educator and publisher
- Sybil Leek (1917–1982), English witch, astrologer and psychic

== See also ==
- Leak (surname)
