= Rosella (1825 ship) =

History

United Kingdom
- Name: Rosella
- Builder: Newcastle
- Launched: 1825
- Fate: Wrecked 7 December 1825

General characteristics
- Tons burthen: 338 (bm)

Rosella was launched in Newcastle upon Tyne in 1825, and was wrecked on 7 December 1825.

She first appeared in the Register of Shipping (RS) for 1826, with T.Hall, master, Noble, owner, and trade Newcastle. According to the Sound Toll Register the name of Rosella's master was Robert Hall.

Rosella sailed for the Baltic and was reported to have been arrived at Dantzig on 17 October, from Copenhagen. She may have left and returned because on 1 December she brought to Danzig the crew of Severn, Wilkinson, master, of and for Chepstow, from Memel. Severn's crew had abandoned her on 28 November, after she had become waterlogged; one man had been lost.

On 7 December, Roselle, Robert Hall, master, was driven ashore and wrecked on Bornholm, Denmark. Rosella was on the return leg of her maiden voyage, from Danzig to Newcastle upon Tyne. LL reported on 3 January 1826, that the crew and materials had been saved. Furthermore, part of the cargo was expected to be saved.

In late 1825 or early 1826, Emperor Alexander, Armstrong, master rescued part of Rosella's crew and the members of Severn's crew aboard Rosella. Emperor Alexander had great difficulty rescuing the crews, having to use ropes to haul them individually to shore over the rocks. She rescued eight members of Rosella's crew; the other 12 chose to remain on Bornholm to take care of the wreck and to await another vessel that might bring them home. Off Flamborough Head, Emperor Alexander encountered the brig Henry and William, of Aberdeen, Allan, master and transferred the rescued men to her. Henry and William delivered them to Aberdeen on 17 January 1826.
