= Severn (1817 ship) =

UK merchant ship 1817–1825

History

United Kingdom
- Name: Severn
- Namesake: River Severn
- Builder: Chepstow
- Launched: 1817
- Fate: Abandoned 28 November 1825

General characteristics
- Tons burthen: 112 (bm)
- Sail plan: Snow

Severn was launched in Chepstow in 1817. Her crew abandoned her in the Baltic on 28 November 1825.

== Career ==
Severn first appeared in Lloyd's Register (LR) in 1818 with Williams, master, Pephorne, owner, and trade London.

| Year | Master | Owner | Trade | Source |
|---|---|---|---|---|
| 1820 | Williams | Boucher & Co. | Plymouth–Chester | LR |
| 1826 | Williams | Hodges | Cork | LR |

== Fate ==
On 1 December 1825 Rosella brought to Danzig the crew of Severn, Wilkinson, master, of and for Chepstow, from Memel. Her crew had abandoned Severn on 28 November after she had become waterlogged; one man had been lost.

On 7 December Roselle was driven ashore and wrecked on Bornholm, Denmark. In late 1825 or early 1826, Emperor Alexander, Armstrong, master rescued part of Rosella's crew and the members of Severn's crew aboard Rosella. Emperor Alexander had great difficulty rescuing the crews, having to use ropes to haul them individually to shore over the rocks. She rescued eight members of Rosella's crew; the other 12 chose to remain on Bornholm to take care of the wreck and to await another vessel that might bring them home. Off Flamborough Head, Emperor Alexander encountered the brig Henry and William, of Aberdeen, Allan, master and transferred the rescued men to her. Henry and William delivered them to Aberdeen on 17 January 1826.

Some fishermen recovered Severn and brought her into port near Karlskrona where the British Consul took possession. She was sold for £130. Nothing had yet been decided concerning the sale of her cargo, sails, rigging, etc.
