= Listed buildings in Breckland District =

Protected structures in Norfolk, England

There are around 1,600 listed buildings in the Breckland District, which are buildings of architectural or historic interest.

- Grade I buildings are of exceptional interest.
- Grade II* buildings are particularly important buildings of more than special interest.
- Grade II buildings are of special interest.

The lists follow Historic England’s geographical organisation, with entries grouped by county, local authority, and parish (civil and non-civil). The following lists are arranged by parish.

Parish	List of listed buildings	Grade I	Grade II*	Grade II	Total
Ashill	Listed buildings in Ashill, Norfolk				
Attleborough	Listed buildings in Attleborough				
Banham	Listed buildings in Banham, Norfolk				
Bawdeswell	Listed buildings in Bawdeswell				
Beachamwell	Listed buildings in Beachamwell				
Beeston with Bittering	Listed buildings in Beeston with Bittering				
Beetley	Listed buildings in Beetley				
Besthorpe	Listed buildings in Besthorpe, Norfolk				
Billingford	Listed buildings in Billingford				
Bintree	Listed buildings in Bintree				
Blo' Norton	Listed buildings in Blo' Norton				
Bradenham	Listed buildings in Bradenham, Norfolk				
Brettenham	Listed buildings in Brettenham, Norfolk				
Bridgham	Listed buildings in Bridgham				
Brisley	Listed buildings in Brisley				
Bylaugh	Listed buildings in Bylaugh				
Carbrooke	Listed buildings in Carbrooke				
Caston	Listed buildings in Caston				
Cockley Cley	Listed buildings in Cockley Cley				
Colkirk	Listed buildings in Colkirk				
Cranwich	Listed buildings in Cranwich				
Cranworth	Listed buildings in Cranworth				
Croxton	Listed buildings in Croxton, Norfolk				
Dereham	Listed buildings in Dereham				
Didlington	Listed buildings in Didlington				
East Tuddenham	Listed buildings in East Tuddenham				
Elsing	Listed buildings in Elsing				
Foulden	Listed buildings in Foulden, Norfolk				
Foxley	Listed buildings in Foxley, Norfolk				
Fransham	Listed buildings in Fransham				
Garboldisham	Listed buildings in Garboldisham				
Garvestone, Reymerston and Thuxton	Listed buildings in Garvestone, Reymerston and Thuxton				
Gateley	Listed buildings in Gateley				
Gooderstone	Listed buildings in Gooderstone				
Great Cressingham	Listed buildings in Great Cressingham				
Great Dunham	Listed buildings in Great Dunham				
Great Ellingham	Listed buildings in Great Ellingham				
Gressenhall	Listed buildings in Gressenhall				
Griston	Listed buildings in Griston				
Guist	Listed buildings in Guist				
Hardingham	Listed buildings in Hardingham				
Harling	Listed buildings in Harling, Norfolk				
Hilborough	Listed buildings in Hilborough				
Hockering	Listed buildings in Hockering				
Hockham	Listed buildings in Hockham				
Hoe	Listed buildings in Hoe, Norfolk				
Holme Hale	Listed buildings in Holme Hale				
Horningtoft	Listed buildings in Horningtoft				
Ickburgh	Listed buildings in Ickburgh				
Kempstone	Listed buildings in Kempstone				
Kenninghall	Listed buildings in Kenninghall				
Kilverstone	Listed buildings in Kilverstone				
Lexham	Listed buildings in Lexham				
Litcham	Listed buildings in Litcham				
Little Cressingham	Listed buildings in Little Cressingham				
Little Dunham	Listed buildings in Little Dunham				
Little Ellingham	Listed buildings in Little Ellingham				
Longham	Listed buildings in Longham				
Lynford	Listed buildings in Lynford				
Lyng	Listed buildings in Lyng, Norfolk				
Mattishall	Listed buildings in Mattishall				
Merton	Listed buildings in Merton, Norfolk				
Mileham	Listed buildings in Mileham				
Mundford	Listed buildings in Mundford				
Narborough	Listed buildings in Narborough, Norfolk				
Narford	Listed buildings in Narford				
Necton	Listed buildings in Necton				
New Buckenham	Listed buildings in New Buckenham				
Newton by Castle Acre	Listed buildings in Newton by Castle Acre				
North Elmham	Listed buildings in North Elmham				
North Lopham	Listed buildings in North Lopham				
North Pickenham	Listed buildings in North Pickenham				
North Tuddenham	Listed buildings in North Tuddenham				
Old Buckenham	Listed buildings in Old Buckenham				
Ovington	Listed buildings in Ovington, Norfolk				
Oxborough	Listed buildings in Oxborough				
Quidenham	Listed buildings in Quidenham				
Riddlesworth	Listed buildings in Riddlesworth				
Rocklands	Listed buildings in Rocklands				
Roudham and Larling	Listed buildings in Roudham and Larling				
Rougham	Listed buildings in Rougham, Norfolk				
Saham Toney	Listed buildings in Saham Toney				
Scarning	Listed buildings in Scarning				
Scoulton	Listed buildings in Scoulton				
Shipdham	Listed buildings in Shipdham				
Shropham	Listed buildings in Shropham				
Snetterton	Listed buildings in Snetterton				
South Acre	Listed buildings in South Acre				
South Lopham	Listed buildings in South Lopham				
South Pickenham	Listed buildings in South Pickenham				
Sparham	Listed buildings in Sparham				
Sporle with Palgrave	Listed buildings in Sporle with Palgrave				
Stanfield	Listed buildings in Stanfield				
Stanford	Listed buildings in Stanford, Norfolk				
Stow Bedon and Breckles	Listed buildings in Stow Bedon and Breckles				
Sturston	Listed buildings in Sturston, Norfolk				
Swaffham	Listed buildings in Swaffham				
Swanton Morley	Listed buildings in Swanton Morley				
Thetford	Listed buildings in Thetford				
Thompson	Listed buildings in Thompson, Norfolk				
Tittleshall	Listed buildings in Tittleshall				
Tottington	Listed buildings in Tottington, Norfolk				
Twyford	Listed buildings in Twyford, Norfolk				
Watton	Listed buildings in Watton, Norfolk				
Weasenham All Saints	Listed buildings in Weasenham All Saints				
Weasenham St. Peter	Listed buildings in Weasenham St. Peter				
Weeting-with-Broomhill	Listed buildings in Weeting-with-Broomhill				
Wellingham	Listed buildings in Wellingham				
Wendling	Listed buildings in Wendling, Norfolk				
Whinburgh and Westfield	Listed buildings in Whinburgh and Westfield				
Whissonsett	Listed buildings in Whissonsett				
Wretham	Listed buildings in Wretham				
Yaxham	Listed buildings in Yaxham				

== See also ==
- Grade I listed buildings in Norfolk
- Grade II* listed buildings in Norfolk

== Sources ==
- Wilson, Bill; Pevsner, Nikolaus (1999) [1962], Norfolk 2: North-West and South, The Buildings of England, New Haven and London: Yale University Press, ISBN 978-0-300-09657-6
