= Pilch =

Pilch is a surname. Notable people with the surname include:

- Adalbert Pilch (1917–2004), Austrian painter and graphic artist
- Adam Pilch (1965–2010), Polish military chaplain
- Adolf Pilch (1914–2000), Polish resistance fighter
- David Pilch (born 1943), English cricketer
- Fuller Pilch (1804–1870), English cricketer
- Hartmut Pilch (born 1963), interpreter, translator, software developer
- Herbert Pilch (1927–2018), German linguist
- Jerzy Pilch (1952–2020), Polish writer and journalist
- John Pilch (1925–1991), American basketball player
- Karilyn Pilch (born 1986), American ice hockey manager
- Lansing Pilch, retired United States Air Force major general
- Łukasz Pilch (born 1978), Polish guitarist
- Nathaniel Pilch (1793–1881), English cricketer
- William Pilch (cricketer, born 1794) (1794–1866), English cricketer
- William Pilch (cricketer, born 1820) (1820–1882), English cricketer

== See also ==
- Public Interest Law Clearing House (otherwise 'PILCH'), a legal referral service based in Melbourne, Australia
- Yellow-eye mullet, also known as pilch
