= William Pilch =

William Pilch may refer to:

- William Pilch (cricketer, born 1794), English cricketer
- William Pilch (cricketer, born 1820), his nephew, English cricketer
