= Panford Beck =

Watercourse in Norfolk, England

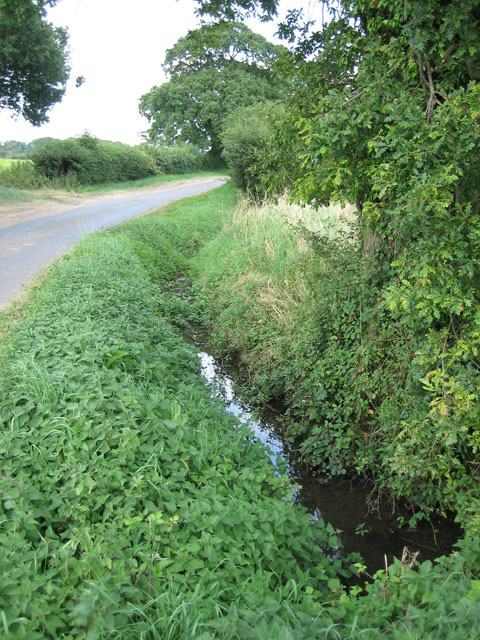
- The headwaters of Panford Beck

- Panford Beck within Breckland

Location
- Country: England
- State: Norfolk
- Region: East of England
- District: Breckland

Physical characteristics
- Source: 1 mile north east of the village of Brisley
- Mouth: Merges with the Black Water
  - coordinates: 52°44′8.8″N 0°54′34.6″E
- Length: 2.5 mi (4.0 km)

Panford Beck is a minor watercourse that is entirely in the county of Norfolk, eastern England. This small short beck rises within the Parish of North Elmham a mile north east of the village of Brisley (grid reference TF956228). The beck is a tributary of the Black Water which eventually joins the River Wensum. The headwater is a small pool by the side of a lane. From here the beck flows south across open farmland where various streams and ditches contribute to its flow. After a distance of 2.5 miles (4.0 km) it joins the Black Water.

== Gallery ==
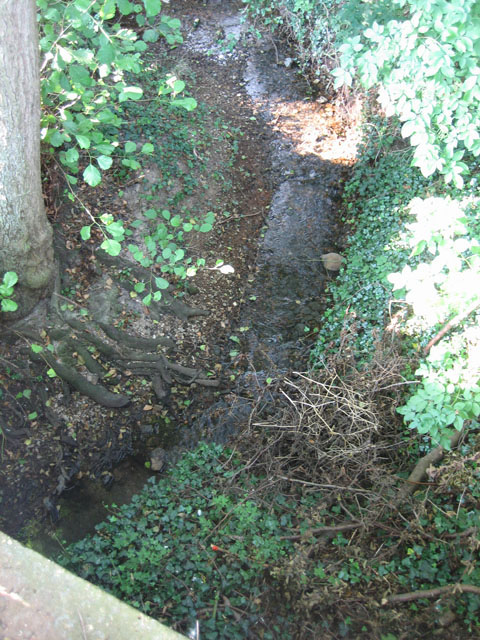
Panford Beck passing under the Elmham Road bridge at grid reference TF961215
