= Norfolk county cricket team (1764–1875) =

Historical English cricket team

Norfolk
Team information
- Established: 1764
- Last match: 1875

History
- Notable players: Fuller Pilch

Until 1875, the Norfolk county cricket team, always known as Norfolk, was organised by individual patrons and other groups, in particular the Holt Cricket Club. It is known to have played matches, some against other county teams, from 1764 until the formation of Norfolk County Cricket Club in 1876.

== 18th century ==
The earliest reference to cricket in Norfolk is from 1745, although the game was known in the county before that date. F. S. Ashley-Cooper, writing in 1900, recounted a "tradition" of a club playing at Swaffham as early as 1700, and games played in London and South-East England featured in press reports in the Norwich press during the 1720s and 1730s.

The first inter-county match played by a Norfolk team was against Suffolk at Bury St Edmunds Racecourse in August 1764, with three further matches played during the same year—one at Diss, and the other two at nearby Scole. In 1797, Norfolk played against England (i.e., the "rest" of England) at the Racecourse Ground in Swaffham.

== 19th century ==
=== Norfolk v MCC ===
In 1820, Norfolk for the first time played in an historically important match. This was at Lord's against Marylebone Cricket Club (MCC). Norfolk's team included Fuller Pilch with his brothers Nathaniel and William. They were from Holt Cricket Club, but they also needed three given men, who were E. H. Budd, Felix Ladbroke, and Thomas Vigne. The match is historically famous because William Ward made his record score of 278 for MCC. In the next two years, Holt-based Norfolk played matches against Nottingham.

=== 1826 to 1876 ===
The first Norfolk county club, as such, was organised in 1826 or 1827 by Lord Suffield. During the 1830s, a number of matches involving Norfolk, or the Gentlemen of Norfolk, were recorded, including matches against MCC in 1830. By 1831, The Sporting Magazine was describing Norfolk as one of the strongest county teams in the country.

Between 1833 and 1836, Norfolk played five more important matches, their last, all against Yorkshire, whose team was largely organised by Sheffield Cricket Club. While these matches were important in the development of county cricket, they were played by professional cricketers rather than the amateur players who made up Suffield's club. Norfolk's players included the twin brothers Richard and William Bagge, James Bird, Mathew Daplyn, John Dolphin, Henry Knatchbull, and the three Pilch brothers.

Although matches continued against MCC and Cambridge Town Club, the county club had largely ceased to operate by 1848. It was revived in 1862, with subscriptions continuing into the late 1860s, but regular matches could not be established, and the club ultimately accumulated debt. The Norfolk name nevertheless continued to be used for matches into the 1870s, including games against MCC, Cambridgeshire, Cambridge University, and Essex.

The present county club was founded in October 1876, with Charles Harbord, 5th Baron Suffield, serving as president. It played its first matches in 1877.

== Bibliography ==
- ACS (1981). A Guide to Important Cricket Matches Played in the British Isles 1709–1863. Nottingham: ACS. OCLC 85045528.
- Birley, Derek (1999). A Social History of English Cricket. London: Aurum Press. ISBN 978-18-54107-10-7 – via Internet Archive.
- Hounsome, Keir (2015). A Game Well Played: a History of Cricket in Norfolk. Norwich: Hounsome. ISBN 978-09-93229-60-2.
- Rae, Simon (1998). W. G. Grace: A Life. London: Faber & Faber. ISBN 978-05-71178-55-1.
