= Robert Pilch =

English cricketer and footballer

Personal information
- Full name: Robert George Pilch
- Date of birth: 12 October 1877
- Place of birth: Holt, Norfolk, England
- Date of death: 1 November 1957 (aged 80)
- Place of death: Norwich, Norfolk, England
- Positions: Centre-forward; half back

Senior career*
Years	Team	Apps	(Gls)
- Melton Constable
- Norwich CEYMS
1903–1905	Tottenham Hotspur	3	(0)
1911–1912	Norwich City	2	(0)
1912	Everton	1	(0)
Total		6	(0)
- * Club domestic league appearances and goals

Robert George Pilch (12 October 1877 – 1 November 1957) was an English amateur footballer and minor counties cricketer.

Born to the Norfolk Pilch family, noted for their contributions to cricket, Pilch was born in October 1877 at Holt, Norfolk. He first played football for Melton Constable, before appearing for Norwich CEYMS. He played for Tottenham Hotspur from 1903 to 1905, making three appearances in the London League and Western League. Although capable of playing at a high level, Pilch preferred to play for Norwich CEYMS. He gave the CEYMS 25 years service, serving not only in a playing capacity but also as a committeeman, secretary, chairman and president. He played two matches for Norwich City in the 1911–12 Southern Football League. The following year he played for Everton against Norwich when Everton turned up without Jack Sharp for the match, with Pilch due to referee in the match. He later served as a director and vice-chairman of Norwich.

Pilch also played cricket at minor counties level for Norfolk, albeit intermittently, from 1899 to 1921, making 36 appearances in the Minor Counties Championship. He died at Norwich in November 1957. Noted relatives include the cricketers William Pilch and David Pilch.
