= 1845 English cricket season =

Cricket season review

The 1845 English cricket season was the 19th of the roundarm era. (Note: Any match listed in the ACS' Important Match Guide (1981) is historically important, and therefore of the highest standard, whether or not a scorecard might exist. The same applies to numerous matches discovered by researchers since 1981. For further information, see First-class cricket.) Surrey County Cricket Club was officially founded.

== Important matches ==
- 1845 match list

== Events ==
Although several earlier county organisations had existed going back to 1709, the present Surrey County Cricket Club was formed at a meeting which took place at the new Kennington Oval during a match between two local teams on 21 & 22 August.

== Leading batsmen ==
Fuller Pilch was the leading runscorer with 569 @ 21.07

Other leading batsmen were: W Dorrinton, T Box, N Felix, CG Taylor, T Sewell, T Barker, WR Hillyer

== Leading bowlers ==
WR Hillyer was the leading wicket-taker with 174

Other leading bowlers were: J Dean, FW Lillywhite, W Clarke, A Mynn

== Bibliography ==
- ACS (1981). A Guide to Important Cricket Matches Played in the British Isles 1709–1863. Nottingham: ACS. OCLC 85045528.
- Warner, Pelham (1946). Lords: 1787–1945. London: Harrap. OCLC 877106024.
