= George Englebright =

English cricketer

Personal information
- Born: 1805; Elmham, Norfolk, England
- Died: April 1877 (aged 71/72); Brisley, Norfolk, England

Domestic team information
- Years: Team
- 1834: Norfolk

Career statistics
Competition	First-class
Matches	1
Runs scored	0
Batting average	0.00
100s/50s	0/0
Top score	0
Catches/stumpings	0/–
- Source: Cricinfo, 5 July 2013

George Englebright (1805 – April 1877) was an English cricketer. He was likely born at Elmham, Norfolk, where he was christened on 15 November 1805.

Englebright made a single first-class appearance for Norfolk against Yorkshire in 1834 at Hyde Park Ground, Sheffield. In a match which Yorkshire won by a concession, Englebright batted once and was dismissed for a duck by Tom Marsden.
