= Daplyn =

Daplyn is a surname. Notable people with the surname include:

- Alfred James Daplyn (1844–1926), Australian artist
- Mathew Daplyn (1802–1854), English cricketer
