= Racecourse Ground, Swaffham =

Cricket ground in Swaffham, Norfolk

Racecourse Ground
- Location: Swaffham, Norfolk
- Home club: Swaffham Cricket Club
- Establishment: 1797
- Last used: 1850

The Racecourse Ground was a cricket ground in Swaffham, Norfolk. The first recorded match on the ground was in 1797, when the Earl of Winchilsea's XI played Charles Lennox's XI.

Norfolk teams played on the ground from 1844 to 1850 before the formation of Norfolk County Cricket Club, with the final recorded match on the ground against Marylebone Cricket Club. The exact location of the ground is unknown.
