= Listed buildings in Thetford =

Non-Civil Parish in Norfolk, England

Thetford is a town and civil parish in the Breckland District of Norfolk, England. It contains 185 listed buildings that are recorded in the National Heritage List for England. Of these eight are grade I, eleven are grade II* and 166 are grade II.

This list is based on the information retrieved online from Historic England.

== Key ==
Grade	Criteria
I	Buildings that are of exceptional interest
II*	Particularly important buildings of more than special interest
II	Buildings that are of special interest

== Listing ==
Name	Grade	Location	Type	Completed (Note: The date given is the date used by Historic England as significant for the initial building or that of an important part in the structure's description.)	Date designated	Grid ref. (Note: The grid reference is based on the British national grid reference system, sometimes known as OSGB36, used by the Ordnance Survey.) Geo-coordinates	Notes	Entry number (Note: The "List Entry Number" is a unique number assigned to each listed building and scheduled monument by Historic England.)	Image	Wikidata
Roman Catholic Church of St Mary and Parish Hall	II*	73 Newtown, IP24 3AU			3 April 1951	TL8666482854; 52°24′43″N 0°44′35″E		1207963	Upload Photo	Q17553702
Charles Burrell Museum	II	IP24 1BN	museum		10 March 1971	TL8680283200; 52°24′54″N 0°44′43″E		1195908	Charles Burrell Museum More images	Q21716346
Thetford War Memorial	II	IP24 2AL	war memorial		5 July 2019	TL8718283053; 52°24′48″N 0°45′03″E		1464827	Thetford War Memorial More images	Q66480217
Thetford Warren Lodge	II*	IP24 3NE	tower house		10 March 1971	TL8392984066; 52°25′25″N 0°42′13″E		1297876	Thetford Warren Lodge More images	Q17553759
Priory Gatehouse	I	Abbeygate			3 April 1951	TL8657583524; 52°25′04″N 0°44′32″E		1195946	Upload Photo	Q96108767
Remains of Priory of Our Lady of Thetford Including Prior's Lodging	I	Abbeygate	monastery ruins		3 April 1951	TL8661683369; 52°24′59″N 0°44′34″E		1297875	Remains of Priory of Our Lady of Thetford Including Prior's Lodging More images	Q7783570
80 and 81, Brandon Road	II	80 and 81, Brandon Road			10 March 1971	TL8576083153; 52°24′53″N 0°43′48″E		1195948	Upload Photo	Q26490507
Remains of Priory of St Sepulchre	I	Brandon Road	monastery ruins		3 April 1951	TL8648783060; 52°24′49″N 0°44′26″E		1195947	Remains of Priory of St Sepulchre More images	Q5886189
6 and 8, Bridge Street (see Details for Further Address Information)	II	1-7, Bridgate Street			10 March 1971	TL8687183125; 52°24′51″N 0°44′47″E		1195949	Upload Photo	Q26490508
12 and 14, Bridge Street	II	12 and 14, Bridge Street			10 March 1971	TL8686083104; 52°24′50″N 0°44′46″E		1195950	Upload Photo	Q26490509
Bridge House Including Attached Outbuildings at Rear and Gate Pier	II	16, Bridge Street	architectural structure		3 April 1951	TL8685083101; 52°24′50″N 0°44′45″E		1207462	Bridge House Including Attached Outbuildings at Rear and Gate Pier More images	Q26502606
17, Bridge Street	II	17, Bridge Street			10 March 1971	TL8681883018; 52°24′48″N 0°44′43″E		1207470	Upload Photo	Q26502613
Losinga	II	22, Bridge Street			10 March 1971	TL8680783040; 52°24′48″N 0°44′43″E		1207476	Upload Photo	Q26502619
Ivy Lodge	II	23, Bridge Street			10 March 1971	TL8674482918; 52°24′45″N 0°44′39″E		1297879	Upload Photo	Q26585419
28, Bridge Street	II	28, Bridge Street			10 March 1971	TL8675282976; 52°24′46″N 0°44′40″E		1207483	Upload Photo	Q26502626
30, Bridge Street	II	30, Bridge Street			10 March 1971	TL8674482970; 52°24′46″N 0°44′39″E		1195952	Upload Photo	Q26490511
The Limes	II	32, Bridge Street			10 March 1971	TL8672982957; 52°24′46″N 0°44′39″E		1207488	Upload Photo	Q26502631
Gates and Boundary Wall at Grammar School and Attached 'kissing' Gate	II	Bridge Street			1 December 1993	TL8678183004; 52°24′47″N 0°44′42″E		1279699	Upload Photo	Q26568898
Remains of Dominican Church at Thetford Grammar School	I	Bridge Street			3 April 1951	TL8675583069; 52°24′49″N 0°44′40″E		1207496	Upload Photo	Q17535038
Southern Gate Pier at Number 16	II	Bridge Street			10 March 1971	TL8685383088; 52°24′50″N 0°44′45″E		1297878	Upload Photo	Q26585418
Thetford Grammar School Library and Attached Former Stable	II	Bridge Street			1 December 1993	TL8677883050; 52°24′49″N 0°44′41″E		1195953	Thetford Grammar School Library and Attached Former Stable	Q26490512
Town Bridge	II	Bridge Street	bridge		10 March 1971	TL8685283078; 52°24′50″N 0°44′45″E		1195954	Town Bridge More images	Q26490513
Old Water Mill	II	Bridges Walk	mill building		10 March 1971	TL8704882859; 52°24′42″N 0°44′55″E		1279706	Old Water Mill More images	Q26568905
27 and 29, Bury Road	II	27 and 29, Bury Road			10 March 1971	TL8683782830; 52°24′42″N 0°44′44″E		1195955	Upload Photo	Q26490514
37, Bury Road	II	37, Bury Road			3 April 1951	TL8684682765; 52°24′39″N 0°44′44″E		1279709	Upload Photo	Q26568907
50-62, Bury Road	II	50-62, Bury Road			10 March 1971	TL8683282706; 52°24′38″N 0°44′44″E		1195956	Upload Photo	Q26490515
59-71, Bury Road	II	59-71, Bury Road			10 March 1971	TL8685882682; 52°24′37″N 0°44′45″E		1195918	Upload Photo	Q26490480
Church of St Mary the Less	II*	Bury Road	church building		3 April 1951	TL8678982822; 52°24′41″N 0°44′42″E		1297899	Church of St Mary the Less More images	Q17553765
Coffin Cover Immediately North East of Chancel of Church of St Mary the Less	II	Bury Road			17 June 1993	TL8680282827; 52°24′42″N 0°44′42″E		1195919	Upload Photo	Q26490481
Group of 5 Table Tombs Immediately South East of Chancel of Church of St Mary the Less	II	Bury Road			17 June 1993	TL8680982813; 52°24′41″N 0°44′43″E		1297900	Upload Photo	Q26585435
Table Tomb 15 Metres North of Nave of Church of St Mary the Less	II	Bury Road			17 June 1993	TL8678482836; 52°24′42″N 0°44′41″E		1195920	Upload Photo	Q26490482
The Old Cage	II	Cage Lane			3 April 1951	TL8716382972; 52°24′46″N 0°45′02″E		1195921	Upload Photo	Q26490483
Monument at Ngr Tl8754982673, 100 Metres South of Friary House (friary House Not Included)	II	100 Metres South Of Friary House (friary House Not Included), Castle Lane			3 April 1951	TL8754982673; 52°24′36″N 0°45′21″E		1297901	Upload Photo	Q26585436
1, Castle Street	II	1, Castle Street			3 April 1951	TL8721883062; 52°24′49″N 0°45′05″E		1195922	Upload Photo	Q26490484
Central Hotel (part)	II	2, Castle Street			10 March 1971	TL8721983044; 52°24′48″N 0°45′05″E		1297902	Upload Photo	Q26684017
3 and 5, Castle Street	II*	3 and 5, Castle Street			3 April 1951	TL8722483061; 52°24′49″N 0°45′05″E		1207558	Upload Photo	Q17553681
30, Castle Street	II	30, Castle Street			10 March 1971	TL8733183016; 52°24′47″N 0°45′11″E		1195923	Upload Photo	Q26490485
32, 34 and 36, Castle Street	II	32, 34 and 36, Castle Street			3 April 1951	TL8734283012; 52°24′47″N 0°45′11″E		1207589	Upload Photo	Q26502733
38-48, Castle Street	II	38-48, Castle Street			3 April 1951	TL8739683000; 52°24′46″N 0°45′14″E		1297903	Upload Photo	Q26585438
43 and 45, Castle Street	II	43 and 45, Castle Street			10 March 1971	TL8731283043; 52°24′48″N 0°45′10″E		1279668	Upload Photo	Q26568869
47, Castle Street	II	47, Castle Street			3 April 1951	TL8732183041; 52°24′48″N 0°45′10″E		1195924	Upload Photo	Q26490486
49, Castle Street	II	49, Castle Street			3 April 1951	TL8732983039; 52°24′48″N 0°45′11″E		1207604	Upload Photo	Q26502746
50-60, Castle Street	II	50-60, Castle Street			3 April 1951	TL8743782991; 52°24′46″N 0°45′16″E		1195925	Upload Photo	Q26490487
51, Castle Street	II	51, Castle Street			3 April 1951	TL8733883038; 52°24′48″N 0°45′11″E		1207605	Upload Photo	Q26502747
57 and 59, Castle Street	II	57 and 59, Castle Street			3 April 1951	TL8739983031; 52°24′47″N 0°45′14″E		1297904	Upload Photo	Q26585439
71-87, Castle Street	II	71-87, Castle Street			3 April 1951	TL8745683029; 52°24′47″N 0°45′17″E		1207608	Upload Photo	Q26502750
89 and 91, Castle Street	II	89 and 91, Castle Street			3 April 1951	TL8749183028; 52°24′47″N 0°45′19″E		1207613	Upload Photo	Q26502755
The Albion Public House	II	93 and 95, Castle Street	pub		3 April 1951	TL8751083026; 52°24′47″N 0°45′20″E		1195926	The Albion Public House More images	Q26490488
97-103, Castle Street	II	97-103, Castle Street			3 April 1951	TL8752683025; 52°24′47″N 0°45′21″E		1207619	Upload Photo	Q26502762
Castle House	II	Castle Street			10 March 1971	TL8756383022; 52°24′47″N 0°45′23″E		1297905	Upload Photo	Q26585440
Number 6 Market Place and Number 1a Castle Street	II	1a, Castle Street			10 March 1971	TL8721383063; 52°24′49″N 0°45′04″E		1195905	Upload Photo	Q26490467
Almshouses Including Surrounding Wall and Outbuildings	II	2-8, Croxton Road			1 December 1993	TL8701683391; 52°25′00″N 0°44′55″E		1195927	Upload Photo	Q26490489
2, 4 and 6, Earls' Street	II	2, 4 and 6, Earls' Street			10 March 1971	TL8720083098; 52°24′50″N 0°45′04″E		1207634	Upload Photo	Q26502775
40 and 42, Earls' Street	II	40 and 42, Earls' Street			10 March 1971	TL8712483273; 52°24′56″N 0°45′00″E		1297906	Upload Photo	Q26585441
43, Earls' Street	II	43, Earls' Street			10 March 1971	TL8712883229; 52°24′54″N 0°45′00″E		1279646	Upload Photo	Q26568849
44, Earls' Street	II	44, Earls' Street			10 March 1971	TL8712083279; 52°24′56″N 0°45′00″E		1195928	Upload Photo	Q26490490
Vine House	II	45, Earls' Street			10 March 1971	TL8712183239; 52°24′54″N 0°45′00″E		1207642	Upload Photo	Q26502782
46, Earls' Street	II	46, Earls' Street			10 March 1971	TL8711683283; 52°24′56″N 0°45′00″E		1195929	Upload Photo	Q26490491
Forecourt Walls and Gates to United Reform Church	II	Earls' Street			1 December 1993	TL8719183122; 52°24′51″N 0°45′03″E		1366062	Upload Photo	Q26647694
United Reform Church	II	Earls' Street			3 April 1951	TL8721283131; 52°24′51″N 0°45′05″E		1207646	Upload Photo	Q26502786
Boscombe House and Twyford	II	2, Ford Street			10 March 1971	TL8734082682; 52°24′36″N 0°45′10″E		1297867	Upload Photo	Q26585411
3-9, Ford Street	II	3-9, Ford Street			10 March 1971	TL8730982721; 52°24′38″N 0°45′09″E		1207662	Upload Photo	Q26502802
Doorway in Garden Wall South East of Number 9	II	Ford Street			10 March 1971	TL8732082708; 52°24′37″N 0°45′09″E		1195930	Upload Photo	Q26490492
Ford Place and Attached Grotto	II	Ford Street			3 April 1951	TL8742982664; 52°24′36″N 0°45′15″E		1207667	Upload Photo	Q26502806
Kitchen Garden Walls at Ford Place	II	Ford Street			1 December 1993	TL8747182680; 52°24′36″N 0°45′17″E		1297868	Upload Photo	Q26585412
The Paddock Including Front Wall and Stables	II	Ford Street			10 March 1971	TL8725882753; 52°24′39″N 0°45′06″E		1366073	Upload Photo	Q26647705
10, Garden Place	II	10, Garden Place			10 March 1971	TL8687682739; 52°24′39″N 0°44′46″E		1195931	Upload Photo	Q26490493
6, 8 and 10, Grove Lane	II	6, 8 and 10, Grove Lane			10 March 1971	TL8720983324; 52°24′57″N 0°45′05″E		1207686	Upload Photo	Q26502824
12-18, Grove Lane	II	12-18, Grove Lane			10 March 1971	TL8720383338; 52°24′58″N 0°45′04″E		1195932	Upload Photo	Q26490494
19, Guildhall Street	II	19, Guildhall Street			3 June 1993	TL8723582935; 52°24′45″N 0°45′05″E		1279612	Upload Photo	Q26568816
Cintra, Including Garden Wall and Area Railings	II	Including Garden Wall And Area Railings, 31, White Hart Street	architectural structure		10 March 1971	TL8695083298; 52°24′57″N 0°44′51″E		1219316	Cintra, Including Garden Wall and Area Railings More images	Q26513868
41, King Street	II	41, King Street			10 March 1971	TL8697583114; 52°24′51″N 0°44′52″E		1195933	Upload Photo	Q26490495
45, King Street	II	45, King Street			10 March 1971	TL8696983114; 52°24′51″N 0°44′52″E		1207697	Upload Photo	Q26502835
47 and 49, King Street	II	47 and 49, King Street			10 March 1971	TL8696383116; 52°24′51″N 0°44′51″E		1195934	Upload Photo	Q26490496
51, King Street	II	51, King Street			10 March 1971	TL8695183118; 52°24′51″N 0°44′51″E		1207710	Upload Photo	Q26502848
Baptist Chapel	II	King Street			1 December 1993	TL8708983118; 52°24′51″N 0°44′58″E		1279626	Upload Photo	Q26568830
Bell Hotel	II*	King Street	hotel		3 April 1951	TL8692483124; 52°24′51″N 0°44′49″E		1195935	Bell Hotel More images	Q4883185
Church of St Cuthbert	II*	King Street	church building		3 April 1951	TL8712083067; 52°24′49″N 0°45′00″E		1207726	Church of St Cuthbert More images	Q17553685
Garden Wall to King's House	II	King Street			10 March 1971	TL8702283166; 52°24′52″N 0°44′55″E		1207804	Upload Photo	Q26502927
King's House	II	King Street	house		3 April 1951	TL8696083161; 52°24′52″N 0°44′51″E		1195936	King's House More images	Q26490497
Outbuildings in Yard of Numbers 27 and 29, King's Head Inn	II	King's Head Inn, White Hart Street			10 March 1971	TL8692483264; 52°24′56″N 0°44′50″E		1219304	Upload Photo	Q26513856
1-9 and 9a, Magdalen Street	II	1-9 and 9a, Magdalen Street			10 March 1971	TL8721183098; 52°24′50″N 0°45′04″E		1195937	Upload Photo	Q26490498
2, 2a and 4, Magdalen Street	II	2, 2a and 4, Magdalen Street			10 March 1971	TL8722583090; 52°24′50″N 0°45′05″E		1279551	Upload Photo	Q26568758
14, Magdalen Street	II	14, Magdalen Street			10 March 1971	TL8724683105; 52°24′50″N 0°45′06″E		1195938	Upload Photo	Q26490499
16 and 20, Magdalen Street	II	16 and 20, Magdalen Street			10 March 1971	TL8725583111; 52°24′50″N 0°45′07″E		1207807	Upload Photo	Q26502930
17 and 19, Magdalen Street	II	17 and 19, Magdalen Street			10 March 1971	TL8729783171; 52°24′52″N 0°45′09″E		1297889	Upload Photo	Q26585427
21-27, Magdalen Street	II	21-27, Magdalen Street			10 March 1971	TL8730783181; 52°24′52″N 0°45′10″E		1195898	Upload Photo	Q26490460
22, Magdalen Street	II	22, Magdalen Street			10 March 1971	TL8726283119; 52°24′50″N 0°45′07″E		1195899	Upload Photo	Q26490461
24 and 26, Magdalen Street	II	24, Magdalen Street			10 March 1971	TL8726983125; 52°24′51″N 0°45′08″E		1297890	Upload Photo	Q26585428
Template House	II	29, Magdalen Street			10 March 1971	TL8732483192; 52°24′53″N 0°45′11″E		1195900	Upload Photo	Q26490462
31, Magdalen Street	II	31, Magdalen Street			10 March 1971	TL8733283199; 52°24′53″N 0°45′11″E		1297891	Upload Photo	Q26585429
33 and 35, Magdalen Street	II	33 and 35, Magdalen Street			10 March 1971	TL8734383206; 52°24′53″N 0°45′12″E		1195901	Upload Photo	Q26490463
Whiteways	II	37, Magdalen Street			10 March 1971	TL8735183211; 52°24′53″N 0°45′12″E		1195902	Upload Photo	Q26490464
36a and 38, Magdalen Street	II	36a and 38, Magdalen Street			10 March 1971	TL8729783140; 52°24′51″N 0°45′09″E		1297892	Upload Photo	Q26585430
39 and 41, Magdalen Street	II	39 and 41, Magdalen Street			10 March 1971	TL8736083217; 52°24′53″N 0°45′13″E		1207818	Upload Photo	Q26502940
40, Magdalen Street	II	40, Magdalen Street			10 March 1971	TL8730483142; 52°24′51″N 0°45′09″E		1195903	Upload Photo	Q26490465
42, Magdalen Street	II	42, Magdalen Street			10 March 1971	TL8731083147; 52°24′51″N 0°45′10″E		1207822	Upload Photo	Q26502943
Harbord's Almshouses	II	49-59, Magdalen Street			10 March 1971	TL8739483233; 52°24′54″N 0°45′14″E		1297893	Upload Photo	Q26585431
50, 52 and 52a, Magdalen Street	II	50, 52 and 52a, Magdalen Street			10 March 1971	TL8732883156; 52°24′52″N 0°45′11″E		1279562	Upload Photo	Q26568769
54-60, Magdalen Street	II	54-60, Magdalen Street			10 March 1971	TL8734083162; 52°24′52″N 0°45′11″E		1195904	Upload Photo	Q26490466
61, Magdalen Street	II	61, Magdalen Street			10 March 1971	TL8741083244; 52°24′54″N 0°45′15″E		1279565	Upload Photo	Q26568772
Black Horse Public House	II	64, Magdalen Street	pub		10 March 1971	TL8736783176; 52°24′52″N 0°45′13″E		1297894	Black Horse Public House More images	Q20666931
3 and 4, Market Place	II*	3 and 4, Market Place			3 April 1951	TL8718883083; 52°24′49″N 0°45′03″E		1207841	Upload Photo	Q17553697
Central Hotel (part)	II	Market Place			10 March 1971	TL8720483045; 52°24′48″N 0°45′04″E		1207858	Upload Photo	Q26502973
Green Dragon Public House	II	Market Place	pub		10 March 1971	TL8720383076; 52°24′49″N 0°45′04″E		1297895	Green Dragon Public House More images	Q26585432
Guildhall	II	Market Place	city hall		10 March 1971	TL8716782998; 52°24′47″N 0°45′02″E		1207867	Guildhall More images	Q26502982
Red Lion Public House	II	Market Place	pub		10 March 1971	TL8715683047; 52°24′48″N 0°45′01″E		1207878	Red Lion Public House More images	Q26502992
Shambles Shopping Arcade	II	Market Place			10 March 1971	TL8716383028; 52°24′48″N 0°45′02″E		1195906	Upload Photo	Q26490468
Tipsy Toad Wine Bar	II	Market Place			10 March 1971	TL8719083000; 52°24′47″N 0°45′03″E		1207891	Upload Photo	Q26503005
3-17 Melford Common	II	3-17, Melford Common, IP24 2HJ			10 March 1971	TL8747283175; 52°24′52″N 0°45′18″E		1195907	Upload Photo	Q26490469
12, 14 and 16, Mill Lane	II	12, 14 and 16, Mill Lane, IP24 3BZ			10 March 1971	TL8690482762; 52°24′39″N 0°44′48″E		1207900	Upload Photo	Q26503014
22, Miller's Lane	II	22, Miller's Lane			1 December 1993	TL8682383399; 52°25′00″N 0°44′45″E		1297896	Upload Photo	Q26585433
Bank House	II	1, Minstergate			10 March 1971	TL8687483144; 52°24′52″N 0°44′47″E		1297877	Upload Photo	Q26585417
St Nicholas House	II	8, Minstergate			3 April 1951	TL8682483214; 52°24′54″N 0°44′44″E		1279518	Upload Photo	Q26568727
Former Factory of Charles Burrell and Sons	II	Minstergate			10 March 1971	TL8680383226; 52°24′54″N 0°44′43″E		1207916	Upload Photo	Q26503028
Abbey Farm Cottage	I	Monksgate			10 March 1971	TL8653183489; 52°25′03″N 0°44′29″E		1207935	Upload Photo	Q17535049
Farm Building to West of Abbey Farm Cottage	I	Monksgate			10 March 1971	TL8650083498; 52°25′04″N 0°44′28″E		1297897	Upload Photo	Q17535162
6-24, Nether Row	II	6-24, Nether Row			3 April 1951	TL8716582816; 52°24′41″N 0°45′01″E		1279505	Upload Photo	Q26568715
3, 5 and 7, Norwich Road	II	3, 5 and 7, Norwich Road			10 March 1971	TL8703683351; 52°24′58″N 0°44′56″E		1195910	Upload Photo	Q26490472
Rose Cottage	II	Now Known As Rose Cottage, Station Lane			1 December 1993	TL8674683705; 52°25′10″N 0°44′41″E		1291604	Upload Photo	Q26579703
The Railway, Formerly Known As the Railway Tavern	II	Now Known As The Railway, Station Road, IP24 1AH	pub		18 October 2013	TL8678283632; 52°25′08″N 0°44′43″E		1415365	The Railway, Formerly Known As the Railway Tavern More images	Q26490640
Nunnery Barn	I	Nunnery Bridges Road, Nunnery Place			3 April 1951	TL8730982301; 52°24′24″N 0°45′08″E		1207997	Upload Photo	Q17535060
Nunnery Gateway	II	Nunnery Drive			26 February 1987	TL8718382270; 52°24′23″N 0°45′01″E		1207969	Upload Photo	Q26503076
1, 2 and 3 Nunnery Cottages	II	1, 2 and 3 Nunnery Cottages, Nunnery Place, Nuns Bridges Road			26 February 1987	TL8725382286; 52°24′24″N 0°45′05″E		1207988	Upload Photo	Q26503095
Walls Running South from Numbers 1, 2 and 3 Nunnery Cottages	II	2 and 3 Nunnery Cottages, Nunnery Place, Nuns Bridges Road			26 February 1987	TL8725882219; 52°24′21″N 0°45′05″E		1195913	Upload Photo	Q26490476
Nuns Bridge South	II	Nuns Bridge Road			1 December 1993	TL8737682508; 52°24′31″N 0°45′12″E		1195912	Upload Photo	Q26490475
Nunnery Place Ruin Approximately 10 Metres South East of the Nunnery	II*	Nuns Bridges Road, Nunnery Place			3 April 1951	TL8731282221; 52°24′21″N 0°45′08″E		1195915	Upload Photo	Q17553669
Nuns Bridge Central	II	Nuns Bridges Road			1 December 1993	TL8738082567; 52°24′32″N 0°45′12″E		1195911	Upload Photo	Q26490474
Nuns Bridge North	II	Nuns Bridges Road			1 December 1993	TL8738182598; 52°24′33″N 0°45′12″E		1279479	Upload Photo	Q26568690
Office Immediately South of Nunnery Barn	II	Nuns Bridges Road, Nunnery Place			26 February 1987	TL8732082279; 52°24′23″N 0°45′09″E		1195914	Upload Photo	Q26490477
The Nunnery	II*	Nuns Bridges Road, Nunnery Place			3 April 1951	TL8730282260; 52°24′23″N 0°45′08″E		1208030	Upload Photo	Q17553707
Frickley Villa	II	1, Old Bury Road			10 March 1971	TL8683882958; 52°24′46″N 0°44′44″E		1208036	Upload Photo	Q26503137
3 and 5, Old Bury Road	II	3 and 5, Old Bury Road			10 March 1971	TL8683682943; 52°24′45″N 0°44′44″E		1195916	Upload Photo	Q26490478
Fulmerston's Almshouses	II*	Old Bury Road			3 April 1951	TL8682282859; 52°24′43″N 0°44′43″E		1279468	Upload Photo	Q17553749
The Old Gaol	II	4 and 6, Old Market Street			3 April 1951	TL8728882762; 52°24′39″N 0°45′08″E		1208054	Upload Photo	Q26503155
10, Old Market Street	II	10, Old Market Street			10 March 1971	TL8732482733; 52°24′38″N 0°45′10″E		1297898	Upload Photo	Q26585434
Gothic House	II	12, Old Market Street			10 March 1971	TL8733882728; 52°24′38″N 0°45′10″E		1293329	Upload Photo	Q26581273
23, Old Market Street	II	23, Old Market Street			3 June 1993	TL8735682741; 52°24′38″N 0°45′11″E		1293332	Upload Photo	Q26581276
51 and 53, Old Market Street	II	51 and 53, Old Market Street			10 March 1971	TL8747382722; 52°24′37″N 0°45′18″E		1196078	Upload Photo	Q26490631
Bidwell Brewery Building	II	Old Market Street			10 March 1971	TL8729282781; 52°24′39″N 0°45′08″E		1297823	Upload Photo	Q26585370
Dolphin Inn	II	Old Market Street	pub		3 April 1951	TL8742082715; 52°24′37″N 0°45′15″E		1297824	Dolphin Inn More images	Q26585371
Numbers 21 (the Gables) and 21a	II	21a, Old Market Street			10 March 1971	TL8733582751; 52°24′38″N 0°45′10″E		1195917	Upload Photo	Q26490479
Thetford Glass Warehouse	II	Old Market Street			10 March 1971	TL8732082770; 52°24′39″N 0°45′10″E		1196079	Upload Photo	Q26490632
Warehouse and Stables	II	Pike Lane			17 June 1993	TL8726682941; 52°24′45″N 0°45′07″E		1196080	Upload Photo	Q26490633
Thetford Railway Station	II	Platforms And Loading Gauge, Thetford Railway Station, Station Road	railway station		10 March 1971	TL8677583662; 52°25′09″N 0°44′43″E		1219218	Thetford Railway Station More images	Q2691707
4, Raymond Street	II	4, Raymond Street			10 March 1971	TL8712382963; 52°24′46″N 0°45′00″E		1196081	Upload Photo	Q26490634
6, 6a-d and 8, Raymond Street	II	6, 6a-d And 8, Raymond Street			10 March 1971	TL8713482950; 52°24′45″N 0°45′00″E		1297825	Upload Photo	Q26585372
10, Raymond Street	II	10, Raymond Street			10 March 1971	TL8713682944; 52°24′45″N 0°45′00″E		1196082	Upload Photo	Q26490635
11 and 11a, Raymond Street	II	11 and 11a, Raymond Street			10 March 1971	TL8714982959; 52°24′45″N 0°45′01″E		1297826	Upload Photo	Q26585373
The Old Rectory Guest House	II	30, Raymond Street	house		10 March 1971	TL8721282830; 52°24′41″N 0°45′04″E		1219142	The Old Rectory Guest House More images	Q26513706
District Council Offices and Attached Maltings	II	Raymond Street			10 March 1971	TL8719682885; 52°24′43″N 0°45′03″E		1196083	Upload Photo	Q26490636
Methodist Church	II	Riverside Walk			10 March 1971	TL8701583066; 52°24′49″N 0°44′54″E		1219175	Upload Photo	Q26513738
Old Mill Public House, Rudolph's Nite Spot and Old Mill Pizza House	II	Rudolph's Nite Spot And Old Mill Pizza House, School Lane	pub		10 March 1971	TL8707682872; 52°24′43″N 0°44′57″E		1219188	Old Mill Public House, Rudolph's Nite Spot and Old Mill Pizza House More images	Q26513750
Spring House	II	Spring Walk			10 March 1971	TL8713882643; 52°24′35″N 0°45′00″E		1196086	Upload Photo	Q26490639
37 and 39, St Nicholas Street	II	37 and 39, St Nicholas Street			10 March 1971	TL8679983378; 52°24′59″N 0°44′43″E		1196084	Upload Photo	Q26490637
62 and 64, St Nicholas Street	II	62 and 64, St Nicholas Street			10 March 1971	TL8681183398; 52°25′00″N 0°44′44″E		1219185	Upload Photo	Q26513748
Warehouse	II	St Nicholas Street			15 January 1971	TL8682383290; 52°24′56″N 0°44′44″E		1196085	Upload Photo	Q26490638
The Presbytery of the Roman Catholic Church of St Mary	II	St. Mary's Catholic Church, 73 Newtown, IP24 3AU			3 April 1951	TL8667382856; 52°24′43″N 0°44′36″E		1195909	Upload Photo	Q26490471
1-4 Station Cottages	II	1-4 Station Cottages, Station Lane, IP24 1AS			18 October 2013	TL8675583689; 52°25′09″N 0°44′42″E		1415378	Upload Photo	Q26676442
K6 Telephone Kiosk Adjacent to Thetford Railway Station	II	Station Road			19 January 1990	TL8677283660; 52°25′09″N 0°44′42″E		1196088	Upload Photo	Q26490641
The Railway Tavern Public House	II	Station Road	pub		10 March 1971	TL8678083632; 52°25′08″N 0°44′43″E		1196087	The Railway Tavern Public House More images	Q26490640
Former Garage Adjoining Riversdale (not Included)	II	Tanner Street			3 April 1951	TL8705782989; 52°24′46″N 0°44′56″E		1291573	Upload Photo	Q26579674
Tanner House	II	Tanner Street			1 December 1993	TL8699883041; 52°24′48″N 0°44′53″E		1219225	Upload Photo	Q26513783
School House, Thetford Grammar School	II	Thetford Grammar School, 19, Bridge Street			10 March 1971	TL8679282986; 52°24′47″N 0°44′42″E		1195951	Upload Photo	Q26490510
Thetford Signal Box	II	Thetford Station, Station Lane			26 April 2013	TL8672483687; 52°25′09″N 0°44′40″E		1414027	Upload Photo	Q26676388
13 and 15, Water Lane	II	13 and 15, Water Lane			10 March 1971	TL8679183353; 52°24′59″N 0°44′43″E		1196089	Upload Photo	Q26490643
Kingdom Hall	II	1, White Hart Street			10 March 1971	TL8689383165; 52°24′52″N 0°44′48″E		1291577	Upload Photo	Q26579678
2, 2a, 4, 4a, 6 and 6a, White Hart Street	II	2, 2a, 4, 4a, 6 and 6a, White Hart Street			10 March 1971	TL8692683209; 52°24′54″N 0°44′50″E		1196090	Upload Photo	Q26490644
Norfolk House	II	3, 3b, 3c and 3d, White Hart Street			10 March 1971	TL8689783174; 52°24′53″N 0°44′48″E		1219246	Upload Photo	Q26513801
5 and 5a, White Hart Street	II	5 and 5a, White Hart Street			10 March 1971	TL8690383186; 52°24′53″N 0°44′48″E		1291551	Upload Photo	Q26579655
7, White Hart Street	II	7, White Hart Street			10 March 1971	TL8690383197; 52°24′53″N 0°44′48″E		1196091	Upload Photo	Q26490645
8, White Hart Street	II	8, White Hart Street			10 March 1971	TL8693383218; 52°24′54″N 0°44′50″E		1219258	Upload Photo	Q26513811
9 and 11, White Hart Street	II	9 and 11, White Hart Street			1 December 1993	TL8690783206; 52°24′54″N 0°44′49″E		1196092	Upload Photo	Q26490646
10, White Hart Street	II	10, White Hart Street			3 April 1951	TL8693683223; 52°24′54″N 0°44′50″E		1291555	Upload Photo	Q26579657
14, White Hart Street	II	14, White Hart Street			10 March 1971	TL8694983246; 52°24′55″N 0°44′51″E		1297788	Upload Photo	Q32676324
15, 17, 19 and 19a, White Hart Street	II	15, 17, 19 and 19a, White Hart Street			10 March 1971	TL8691383226; 52°24′54″N 0°44′49″E		1219271	Upload Photo	Q26513824
18, White Hart Street	II	18, White Hart Street			10 March 1971	TL8695083255; 52°24′55″N 0°44′51″E		1196093	Upload Photo	Q26490647
20, White Hart Street	II	20, White Hart Street			10 March 1971	TL8695683260; 52°24′55″N 0°44′51″E		1219276	Upload Photo	Q26513830
Ancient House Museum	I	21, White Hart Street	museum		3 April 1951	TL8691883238; 52°24′55″N 0°44′49″E		1297789	Ancient House Museum More images	Q17535143
The Chantry	II	22, White Hart Street			3 April 1951	TL8696083276; 52°24′56″N 0°44′52″E		1291530	Upload Photo	Q26579635
King's Head Inn	II	27 and 29, White Hart Street	inn		10 March 1971	TL8693283258; 52°24′55″N 0°44′50″E		1196094	King's Head Inn More images	Q26490648
Thomas Paine Hotel	II	33, White Hart Street			3 April 1951	TL8696183329; 52°24′58″N 0°44′52″E		1196095	Upload Photo	Q26490649
3a, White Hart Street	II	3a, White Hart Street			10 March 1971	TL8690183181; 52°24′53″N 0°44′48″E		1297827	Upload Photo	Q26585374
Church of St Peter	II*	White Hart Street	church building		3 April 1951	TL8692783176; 52°24′53″N 0°44′50″E		1219326	Church of St Peter More images	Q17553709

== See also ==
- Grade I listed buildings in Norfolk
- Grade II* listed buildings in Norfolk

== Sources ==
- Wilson, Bill; Pevsner, Nikolaus (1999) [1962], Norfolk 2: North-West and South, The Buildings of England, New Haven and London: Yale University Press, ISBN 978-0-300-09657-6
