= Listed buildings in Dereham =

Non-Civil Parish in Norfolk, England

Dereham is a town and civil parish in the Breckland District of Norfolk, England. It contains 111 listed buildings that are recorded in the National Heritage List for England. Of these one is grade I, one is grade II* and 109 are grade II.

This list is based on the information retrieved online from Historic England.

== Key ==
Grade	Criteria
I	Buildings that are of exceptional interest
II*	Particularly important buildings of more than special interest
II	Buildings that are of special interest

== Listing ==
Name	Grade	Location	Type	Completed (Note: The date given is the date used by Historic England as significant for the initial building or that of an important part in the structure's description.)	Date designated	Grid ref. (Note: The grid reference is based on the British national grid reference system, sometimes known as OSGB36, used by the Ordnance Survey.) Geo-coordinates	Notes	Entry number (Note: The "List Entry Number" is a unique number assigned to each listed building and scheduled monument by Historic England.)	Image	Wikidata
Dillington Hall	II				20 August 1951	TF9766014686; 52°41′38″N 0°55′24″E		1342661	Upload Photo	Q26626605
Quebec Hall	II				20 August 1951	TF9857914543; 52°41′32″N 0°56′13″E		1077102	Upload Photo	Q26343444
15 and 17, Baxter Row	II	15 and 17, Baxter Row			1 August 1972	TF9892112974; 52°40′41″N 0°56′28″E		1077103	Upload Photo	Q26343448
19, Baxter Row	II	19, Baxter Row			1 August 1972	TF9892112964; 52°40′40″N 0°56′28″E		1077104	Upload Photo	Q26343452
Mortuary Chapels	II	Cemetery Road			13 October 1999	TF9902413889; 52°41′10″N 0°56′35″E		1378799	Upload Photo	Q26659121
Water Tower	II	Cemetery Road			22 June 1984	TF9911214217; 52°41′20″N 0°56′41″E		1077031	Upload Photo	Q26343200
1, Church Street	II	1, Church Street			1 August 1972	TF9888113295; 52°40′51″N 0°56′26″E		1077106	Upload Photo	Q26343459
2, Church Street	II	2, Church Street			1 August 1972	TF9881213312; 52°40′52″N 0°56′23″E		1077069	Upload Photo	Q26343335
4, Church Street	II	4, Church Street			1 August 1972	TF9886913319; 52°40′52″N 0°56′26″E		1246349	Upload Photo	Q26538772
16 and 18, Church Street	II	16 and 18, Church Street			1 August 1972	TF9881213313; 52°40′52″N 0°56′23″E		1246350	Upload Photo	Q26538773
17, Church Street	II	17, Church Street			20 August 1951	TF9880813289; 52°40′51″N 0°56′22″E		1077108	Upload Photo	Q26343467
27 Church Street	II	27, Church Street			1 August 1972	TF9875513289; 52°40′51″N 0°56′20″E		1077109	Upload Photo	Q26343470
Annex to Romany Rye Hotel	II	Church Street			1 August 1972	TF9875913312; 52°40′52″N 0°56′20″E		1342682	Upload Photo	Q26626626
Church Cottage	II	Church Street			13 October 1999	TF9874013330; 52°40′52″N 0°56′19″E		1378779	Upload Photo	Q26659104
Church House	II	Church Street			20 August 1951	TF9873813316; 52°40′52″N 0°56′19″E		1077070	Upload Photo	Q26343340
Church of St Nicholas	I	Church Street	church building		20 August 1951	TF9869113306; 52°40′52″N 0°56′16″E		1077067	Church of St Nicholas More images	Q17534461
Detached Bell Tower	II	Church Street	building		1 August 1972	TF9872013284; 52°40′51″N 0°56′18″E		1077105	Detached Bell Tower More images	Q26343455
Headstone 8 Metres South of South Transept of Church of St Nicholas	II	Church Street			13 October 1999	TF9869313288; 52°40′51″N 0°56′16″E		1378780	Upload Photo	Q26659105
Railings in Front of the Priory (number 15)	II	Church Street			13 October 1999	TF9882113293; 52°40′51″N 0°56′23″E		1378776	Upload Photo	Q26659102
St Withburgas Well (in Churchyard of St Nicholas Church)	II	Church Street	building		1 August 1972	TF9865713302; 52°40′52″N 0°56′14″E		1077068	St Withburgas Well (in Churchyard of St Nicholas Church) More images	Q26343331
The Priory	II	Church Street			20 August 1951	TF9882413284; 52°40′51″N 0°56′23″E		1077107	Upload Photo	Q26343463
21, Commercial Road	II	21, Commercial Road			13 October 1999	TF9912813160; 52°40′46″N 0°56′39″E		1378800	Upload Photo	Q26659122
St Nicholas Works	II	Cowper Road			25 July 1989	TF9906413360; 52°40′53″N 0°56′36″E		1342698	Upload Photo	Q26626642
Borrow Hall Including Forecourt Walls	II	Dumpling Green			20 August 1951	TG0046411935; 52°40′05″N 0°57′48″E		1246352	Upload Photo	Q26538775
Green Farmhouse	II	Dumpling Green, Toftwood			13 October 1999	TF9981811863; 52°40′03″N 0°57′13″E		1378759	Upload Photo	Q26659092
Grange Farmhouse Including Front Railings	II	Etling Green			13 October 1999	TG0131113748; 52°41′02″N 0°58′37″E		1378804	Upload Photo	Q26659126
Mowles Manor	II	Etling Green			1 August 1972	TG0228414354; 52°41′21″N 0°59′30″E		1077072	Upload Photo	Q26343346
Bruntons	II	2, High Street			1 August 1972	TF9890613280; 52°40′50″N 0°56′28″E		1077073	Upload Photo	Q26343350
8 and 10, High Street	II	8 and 10, High Street			1 August 1972	TF9890713253; 52°40′50″N 0°56′28″E		1342684	Upload Photo	Q26626628
19, High Street	II	19, High Street			13 October 1999	TF9892513212; 52°40′48″N 0°56′29″E		1378783	Upload Photo	Q26659107
20, High Street	II	20, High Street			1 August 1972	TF9890813204; 52°40′48″N 0°56′28″E		1169417	Upload Photo	Q26462609
26 and 28, High Street	II	26 and 28, High Street			1 August 1972	TF9891113181; 52°40′47″N 0°56′28″E		1077074	Upload Photo	Q26343354
30 and 32, High Street	II	30 and 32, High Street			1 August 1972	TF9891313168; 52°40′47″N 0°56′28″E		1077075	Upload Photo	Q26343357
31, High Street	II	31, High Street			30 May 1980	TF9893013141; 52°40′46″N 0°56′29″E		1252796	Upload Photo	Q26544629
53, 53a and 55, High Street	II	53, 53a and 55, High Street			30 May 1980	TF9892713089; 52°40′44″N 0°56′28″E		1342697	Upload Photo	Q26626641
Beech House	II	56, High Street			21 July 2000	TF9891113065; 52°40′44″N 0°56′27″E		1077076	Upload Photo	Q26343361
58 and 60, High Street	II	58 and 60, High Street			1 August 1972	TF9891213049; 52°40′43″N 0°56′27″E		1169470	Upload Photo	Q26462661
Baptist Church	II	High Street	Protestant church building		1 August 1972	TF9897613195; 52°40′48″N 0°56′31″E		1342683	Baptist Church More images	Q26626627
The Bull Hotel	II	High Street	hotel		26 January 1979	TF9892813178; 52°40′47″N 0°56′29″E		1342680	The Bull Hotel More images	Q26626624
Former Congregational Chapel - Cowper Church and Sunday School	II	London Road			1 August 1972	TF9895712969; 52°40′40″N 0°56′30″E		1169474	Upload Photo	Q26462666
2, Market Place	II	2, Market Place			1 August 1972	TF9889013295; 52°40′51″N 0°56′27″E		1077077	Upload Photo	Q26343365
3 and 4, Market Place	II	3 and 4, Market Place			1 August 1972	TF9887813324; 52°40′52″N 0°56′26″E		1077078	Upload Photo	Q26343366
5-8, Market Place	II	5-8, Market Place			1 August 1972	TF9885713358; 52°40′53″N 0°56′25″E		1342685	Upload Photo	Q26626629
11-13, Market Place	II	11-13, Market Place			1 August 1972	TF9885113399; 52°40′54″N 0°56′25″E		1169521	Upload Photo	Q26462714
14, Market Place	II	14, Market Place			1 August 1972	TF9884113441; 52°40′56″N 0°56′25″E		1342686	Upload Photo	Q26626630
15, Market Place	II	15, Market Place			1 August 1972	TF9883613448; 52°40′56″N 0°56′24″E		1306503	Upload Photo	Q26593276
17, Market Place	II	17, Market Place			1 August 1972	TF9883113454; 52°40′56″N 0°56′24″E		1077080	Upload Photo	Q26343373
Canterbury House	II	20, Market Place			1 August 1972	TF9883413480; 52°40′57″N 0°56′24″E		1169540	Upload Photo	Q26462732
Numbers 21 and 22 (cabin Restaurant) and Number 23	II	23, Market Place			1 August 1972	TF9884913481; 52°40′57″N 0°56′25″E		1306473	Upload Photo	Q26593250
24, Market Place	II	24, Market Place			1 August 1972	TF9886213486; 52°40′57″N 0°56′26″E		1077083	Upload Photo	Q26343384
29-31, Market Place	II	29-31, Market Place			1 August 1972	TF9887713422; 52°40′55″N 0°56′26″E		1169624	Upload Photo	Q26462806
Caledonian Restaurant North Portion of Barclays Bank Westminster Bank	II	33, Market Place			1 August 1972	TF9888713405; 52°40′55″N 0°56′27″E		1077088	Upload Photo	Q26343400
South Portion of Barclays Bank	II	34, Market Place			1 August 1972	TF9889413393; 52°40′54″N 0°56′27″E		1342687	Upload Photo	Q26626631
35, Market Place	II	35, Market Place, NR19 2AP			1 August 1972	TF9889513377; 52°40′54″N 0°56′27″E		1169665	Upload Photo	Q26462844
Cowper Congregational Church	II	36, Market Place, NR19 2AP			1 August 1972	TF9890913367; 52°40′53″N 0°56′28″E		1077089	Upload Photo	Q26343404
Lloyds Bank	II	38, Market Place, NR19 2AT			1 August 1972	TF9890313340; 52°40′52″N 0°56′28″E		1306417	Upload Photo	Q26593200
41, Market Place	II	41, Market Place			1 August 1972	TF9891213306; 52°40′51″N 0°56′28″E		1342688	Upload Photo	Q26626632
Assembly Room	II	Market Place			20 August 1951	TF9884113432; 52°40′55″N 0°56′25″E		1077079	Upload Photo	Q26343372
Cosy Corner Cafe	II	Market Place			1 August 1972	TF9887113433; 52°40′55″N 0°56′26″E		1077087	Upload Photo	Q26343397
Dereham Labour Party Hq	II	Market Place			1 August 1972	TF9888113464; 52°40′56″N 0°56′27″E		1306457	Upload Photo	Q26593236
Former Corn Exchange	II	Market Place	movie theater		20 August 1951	TF9885613332; 52°40′52″N 0°56′25″E		1169492	Former Corn Exchange More images	Q26462684
Front Wall of Forecourt of No 26 (hill House)	II	Market Place			1 August 1972	TF9889613484; 52°40′57″N 0°56′28″E		1077085	Upload Photo	Q26343391
Iron Railings in Front of Canterbury House	II	Market Place			1 August 1972	TF9883013472; 52°40′57″N 0°56′24″E		1077082	Upload Photo	Q26343381
Railings in Front of Cowper Congregational Church	II	Market Place, NR19 2AP			13 October 1999	TF9889313362; 52°40′53″N 0°56′27″E		1378784	Upload Photo	Q26659108
Rails of Former Cattle Stalls (in Front of Nos 20 to 24 (consec) on South Side of Footway)	II	Market Place			1 August 1972	TF9885313476; 52°40′57″N 0°56′25″E		1077084	Upload Photo	Q26343388
The Eagle Inn	II	Market Place			1 August 1972	TF9887313446; 52°40′56″N 0°56′26″E		1077086	Upload Photo	Q26343395
War Memorial	II	Market Place	war memorial		11 March 2008	TF9885513455; 52°40′56″N 0°56′25″E		1393064	War Memorial More images	Q26672252
Number 19 Market Place and Number 1 Swaffham Road	II	19, Market Place And, 1, Swaffham Road			20 August 1951	TF9880813479; 52°40′57″N 0°56′23″E		1077081	Upload Photo	Q26343377
The Maltings	II	Neatherd Lane			1 August 1972	TF9930113398; 52°40′54″N 0°56′49″E		1342708	Upload Photo	Q26626652
Northall Farmhouse	II	Northall Green			1 August 1972	TF9966014930; 52°41′43″N 0°57′11″E		1077052	Upload Photo	Q26343274
Cherry Lane Cornmill (former)	II	Norwich Lane	tower mill		1 August 1972	TG0034012972; 52°40′39″N 0°57′43″E		1342709	Cherry Lane Cornmill (former) More images	Q5328220
Dereham Maltings (crisp Malting Group)	II*	Norwich Road			27 July 2000	TF9941913130; 52°40′45″N 0°56′55″E		1246348	Upload Photo	Q17553714
1 and 3, Norwich Street	II	1 and 3, Norwich Street			1 August 1972	TF9892713231; 52°40′49″N 0°56′29″E		1077053	Upload Photo	Q26343278
5 and 7, Norwich Street	II	5 and 7, Norwich Street			1 August 1972	TF9893613232; 52°40′49″N 0°56′29″E		1342710	Upload Photo	Q26626654
9 and 11, Norwich Street	II	9 and 11, Norwich Street			1 August 1972	TF9895013233; 52°40′49″N 0°56′30″E		1077054	Upload Photo	Q26343282
13, Norwich Street	II	13, Norwich Street			1 August 1972	TF9895813233; 52°40′49″N 0°56′30″E		1077055	Upload Photo	Q26343285
15, Norwich Street	II	15, Norwich Street			1 August 1972	TF9896613232; 52°40′49″N 0°56′31″E		1342711	Upload Photo	Q26626655
19-25, Norwich Street	II	19-25, Norwich Street			1 August 1972	TF9898713229; 52°40′49″N 0°56′32″E		1342712	Upload Photo	Q26626656
Numbers 24, 26 and 28 (cock Inn)	II	24, 26, Norwich Street	inn		1 August 1972	TF9905213253; 52°40′49″N 0°56′35″E		1169727	Numbers 24, 26 and 28 (cock Inn) More images	Q26462901
Degwm House	II	31, Norwich Street			20 August 1951	TF9903813230; 52°40′49″N 0°56′35″E		1077056	Upload Photo	Q26343289
King's Head Hotel	II	Norwich Street	hotel		1 August 1972	TF9912013254; 52°40′49″N 0°56′39″E		1342713	King's Head Hotel More images	Q26626657
War Memorial Hall	II	Norwich Street			1 August 1972	TF9925413250; 52°40′49″N 0°56′46″E		1306403	Upload Photo	Q26593188
35a, 36, 37, Old Beccles Gate	II	35a, 36, 37, Old Beccles Gate			1 August 1972	TF9861313345; 52°40′53″N 0°56′12″E		1077057	Upload Photo	Q26343292
Number 12 (connaught Villa) and Number 14 (acacia Villa)	II	14, Quebec Road			3 November 1998	TF9880413698; 52°41′04″N 0°56′23″E		1386074	Upload Photo	Q26665830
Explosives Store 20 Yards South East of Tudor Lodge	II	Quebec Road			11 January 1988	TF9888513741; 52°41′05″N 0°56′28″E		1252818	Upload Photo	Q26544650
First House	II	1, Quebec Street			1 August 1972	TF9882613315; 52°40′52″N 0°56′23″E		1077058	Upload Photo	Q26343298
3 and 5, Quebec Street	II	3 and 5, Quebec Street			1 August 1972	TF9882613329; 52°40′52″N 0°56′24″E		1306370	Upload Photo	Q26593157
Clarence House	II	7 and 7a, Quebec Street			1 August 1972	TF9882613342; 52°40′53″N 0°56′24″E		1342714	Upload Photo	Q26626658
9 and 11, Quebec Street	II	9 and 11, Quebec Street			1 August 1972	TF9882513351; 52°40′53″N 0°56′24″E		1169752	Upload Photo	Q26462926
12 and 14, Quebec Street	II	12 and 14, Quebec Street			1 August 1972	TF9883913395; 52°40′54″N 0°56′24″E		1077062	Upload Photo	Q26343311
13 and 15, Quebec Street	II	13 and 15, Quebec Street			1 August 1972	TF9882413361; 52°40′53″N 0°56′23″E		1077059	Upload Photo	Q26343302
23, Quebec Street	II	23, Quebec Street			1 August 1972	TF9881813376; 52°40′54″N 0°56′23″E		1342679	Upload Photo	Q26626623
29 and 31, Quebec Street	II	29 and 31, Quebec Street			1 August 1972	TF9882313385; 52°40′54″N 0°56′23″E		1169759	Upload Photo	Q26462933
37 and 39, Quebec Street	II	37 and 39, Quebec Street			1 August 1972	TF9882313411; 52°40′55″N 0°56′24″E		1077060	Upload Photo	Q26343304
41, Quebec Street	II	41, Quebec Street			1 August 1972	TF9882113422; 52°40′55″N 0°56′23″E		1169768	Upload Photo	Q26462941
43, Quebec Street	II	43, Quebec Street			13 October 1999	TF9880913420; 52°40′55″N 0°56′23″E		1378795	Upload Photo	Q26659118
45, Quebec Street	II	45, Quebec Street			1 August 1972	TF9881913430; 52°40′55″N 0°56′23″E		1077061	Upload Photo	Q26343308
Red Lion Inn	II	Red Lion Street	inn		1 August 1972	TF9884713349; 52°40′53″N 0°56′25″E		1169774	Red Lion Inn More images	Q26462948
Heathfield	II	Sandy Lane			1 August 1972	TF9792414492; 52°41′31″N 0°55′38″E		1077065	Upload Photo	Q26343322
Heathfield Cottage	II	Sandy Lane			1 August 1972	TF9794014478; 52°41′30″N 0°55′39″E		1306350	Upload Photo	Q26593138
Humbletoft	II	Sandy Lane			1 August 1972	TF9796114189; 52°41′21″N 0°55′39″E		1077066	Upload Photo	Q26343328
Moorgate House	II	South Green			20 August 1951	TF9904312530; 52°40′26″N 0°56′33″E		1169794	Upload Photo	Q26462971
Bishop Bonners Cottages (now Museum)	II	St Withburga Lane	museum		20 August 1951	TF9873513268; 52°40′50″N 0°56′19″E		1077063	Bishop Bonners Cottages (now Museum) More images	Q26343315
Garden Wall to South of Guildhall (with Return to Wakes Lane)	II	St Withburga Lane			1 August 1972	TF9875213131; 52°40′46″N 0°56′19″E		1169790	Upload Photo	Q26462966
The Guildhall	II	St Withburga Lane			20 August 1951	TF9875413178; 52°40′47″N 0°56′19″E		1169785	Upload Photo	Q26462961
The Vicarage	II	St Withburga Lane			1 August 1972	TF9867613130; 52°40′46″N 0°56′15″E		1077064	Upload Photo	Q26343318
Milestone in Front of George Hotel	II	Swaffham Road			13 October 1999	TF9881513480; 52°40′57″N 0°56′23″E		1378797	Upload Photo	Q26659120
Hill House and Attached Boundary Wall	II	Theatre Street			20 August 1951	TF9890813492; 52°40′57″N 0°56′28″E		1306451	Upload Photo	Q26593231
Trinity Methodist Church	II	Theatre Street			13 October 1999	TF9902813687; 52°41′03″N 0°56′35″E		1378801	Upload Photo	Q26659123
Premises Adjoining, West Of, No 3 Market Place	II	West Of, No 3 Market Place, Church Street			1 August 1972	TF9886913318; 52°40′52″N 0°56′26″E		1342681	Upload Photo	Q26626625
Old Jolly Farmers	II	Yaxham Road, Toftwood			13 October 1999	TF9976811928; 52°40′06″N 0°57′11″E		1378774	Upload Photo	Q26659101

== See also ==
- Grade I listed buildings in Norfolk
- Grade II* listed buildings in Norfolk

== Sources ==
- Wilson, Bill; Pevsner, Nikolaus (1999) [1962], Norfolk 2: North-West and South, The Buildings of England, New Haven and London: Yale University Press, ISBN 978-0-300-09657-6
