= William Pilch (cricketer, born 1794) =

English cricketer

Personal information
- Born: 4 November 1794; Horningtoft, Norfolk
- Died: 4 September 1866 (aged 71); Sheffield, Yorkshire
- Relatives: Fuller Pilch (brother); Nathaniel Pilch (brother); William Pilch (nephew)

Domestic team information
- Years: Team
- 1820–1836: Norfolk
- Source: CricketArchive, 30 March 2013

William Pilch (4 November 1794 – 4 September 1866) was an English cricketer who played for Norfolk from 1820 to 1836. He was the elder brother of Fuller Pilch. Pilch is recorded in eight matches, totalling 87 runs with a highest score of 30, holding 3 catches and taking 38 wickets with a best performance of 7 wickets in one innings.

He died at an inn in Sheffield, of 'mortification of the big toe'.

== Bibliography ==
- Haygarth, Arthur (1862). Scores & Biographies, Volume 1 (1744–1826). Lillywhite.
