= Mathew Daplyn =

English cricketer

Personal information
- Full name: Mathew Daplyn
- Born: 1802; Hindringham, Norfolk, England
- Died: 4 April 1854 (aged 51/52); Hindringham, Norfolk, England
- Batting: Unknown
- Bowling: Unknown

Domestic team information
- Years: Team
- 1835: Marylebone Cricket Club
- 1833–1836: Norfolk
- 1833: Cambridge University

Career statistics
Competition	First-class
Matches	7
Runs scored	93
Batting average	7.75
100s/50s	–/–
Top score	24
Balls bowled	148
Wickets	23
Bowling average	64.00*
5 wickets in innings	3
10 wickets in match	1
Best bowling	5/?
Catches/stumpings	3/–
- Source: Cricinfo, 30 June 2013

Mathew Daplyn (1802 – 4 April 1854) was an English cricketer. Daplyn's batting and bowling styles are unknown. He was born at Hindringham, Norfolk.

While studying at the University of Cambridge, Daplyn made his debut in first-class cricket for Cambridge University against the Cambridge Town Club at Parker's Piece in 1833. It was in that same season that he made a single first-class appearance for a team of left-handed players against the Marylebone Cricket Club at Lord's, as well as making his debut for Norfolk against Yorkshire at Hyde Park Ground, Sheffield. He made two further first-class appearances for Norfolk in 1834, both against Yorkshire, while in the following two seasons he made his final two appearances in first-class cricket, playing once for the Marylebone Cricket Club in 1835 against Sussex, and for Norfolk against Yorkshire in 1836. In nine first-class matches, Daplyn scored 93 runs at an average of 7.75, with a high score of 24, while with the ball he took 23 wickets, taking a five wicket haul on three occasions and once taking a ten wicket haul in a match.

He had a son, Matthew, who was baptised at Hindringham in 1843. Daplyn died at the village of his birth on 4 April 1854.
