= Holt, Norfolk =

Town in Norfolk, England

Coordinates: 52.90°N 1.09°E

Holt
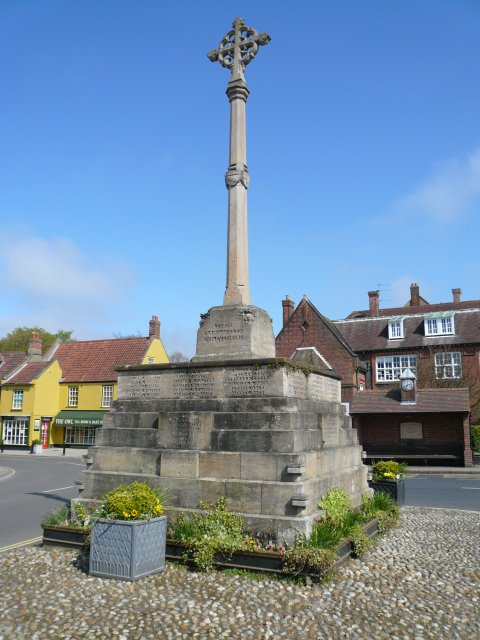
- The war memorial in Holt's market place

- Location within Norfolk
- Area: 12.19 km^{2} (4.71 sq mi)
- Population: 4,725 (2021 census)
  - Density: 388/km^{2} (1,000/sq mi)
- OS grid reference: TG078388
  - London: 127 miles
- Civil parish: Holt
- District: North Norfolk
- Shire county: Norfolk
- Region: East
- Country: England
- Sovereign state: United Kingdom
- Post town: HOLT
- Postcode district: NR25
- Dialling code: 01263
- Police: Norfolk
- Fire: Norfolk
- Ambulance: East of England
- UK Parliament: North Norfolk

Holt is a market town and civil parish in the county of Norfolk, England. The town is 23 miles (37 km) north of the city of Norwich, 10 miles (16 km) west of Cromer and 35 miles (56 km) east of King's Lynn. The town has a population of 3,550, rising and including the ward to 3,810 at the 2011 census. Holt is within the area covered by North Norfolk District Council. Holt has a heritage railway station; it is the south-western terminus of the preserved North Norfolk Railway, known as the Poppy Line.

== History ==
=== Origins ===
The most likely derivation of the name Holt is from an Anglo-Saxon word for woodland, and Holt is located on wooded high ground of the Cromer-Holt ridge at the crossing point of two ancient by-ways and as such was a natural point for a settlement to grow. The town has a mention in the great survey of 1086 known as the Domesday Book. In the survey it is described as a market town and a port with the nearby port of Cley next the Sea being described as Holt's port. It also had five watermills and twelve plough teams and as such was seen as a busy thriving viable settlement. The first Lord of the manor was Walter Giffard; it passed to Hugh, Earl of Chester, who then left it to the De Vaux family. By this time Holt had a well-established market and two annual fairs which were held on 25 April and 25 November. Over the years Holt grew as a local place of trade and commerce. The weekly market which had taken place since before the 1080s was stopped in the 1960s.

=== Great fire ===
On 1 May 1708, Holt was devastated by a fire which destroyed most of the medieval town in three hours. The fire started at Shirehall Plain and quickly spread through the timber houses of the town. The church was also badly damaged with its thatched chancel destroyed, the lead melted from the windows and the flames spreading up the steeple. Contemporary reports stated that the fire spread so swiftly that the butchers did not have time to rescue their meat from their stalls on the market. The damage to the town was estimated to be in the region of £11,000. The town subsequently received many donations from all over the country to aid reconstruction.

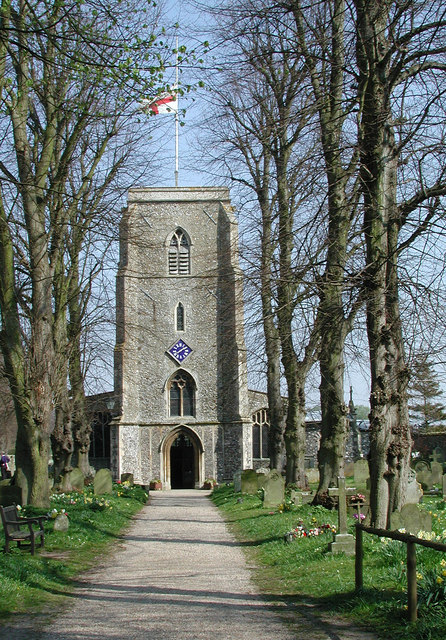
St Andrew's parish church

=== Georgian Holt ===
With most of the medieval buildings destroyed, the rebuilding made Holt notable for its abundance of Georgian buildings, that being the style of the day. However, the town repaired and retains its Norman parish church, which is dedicated to St Andrew.

=== 1968 RAF mid-air collision ===
A mid-air collision over the town occurred on the night of 19 August 1968, involving a Victor Tanker from RAF Marham and a Canberra bomber from RAF Bruggen in West Germany. This followed an electrical storm that had disabled radar systems. All seven airmen on board were killed. A memorial stone hangs inside Saint Andrew's Church.

== Churches ==
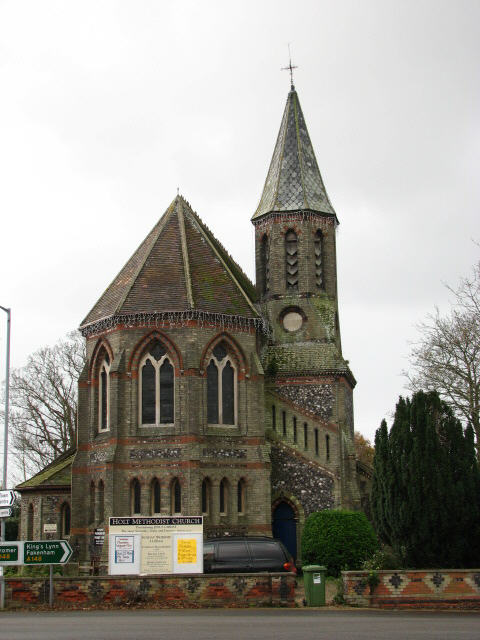
Holt Methodist Church

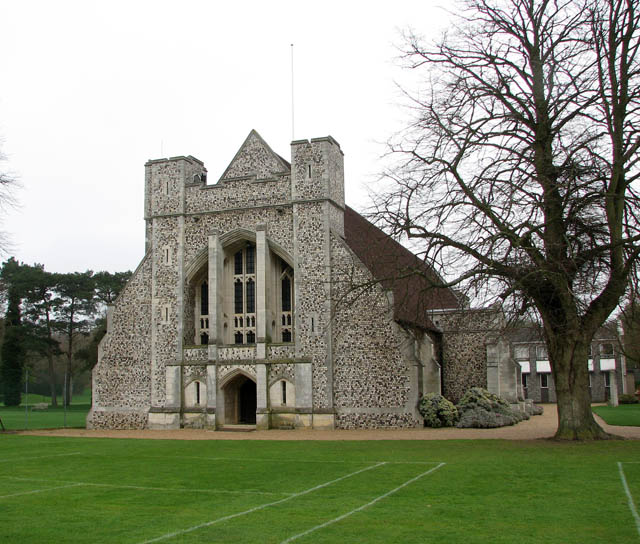
Chapel, Gresham's School

The ancient Church of England parish church of Holt is dedicated to St Andrew the Apostle and probably has late Saxon origins. It was rebuilt in the early 14th century in the Decorated Gothic style by Sir William de Nerford and his wife Petronilla, daughter of John de Vaux, and a tower was added later in the same century. The church was thatched and was badly damaged in the great Holt fire of 1708. Between 1722 and 1727 it was rebuilt, with contributions from Lord Townshend, the Prince of Wales, and Robert Walpole. The church was restored between 1862 and 1874 by William Butterfield.

The Methodist Church, on Obelisk Plain, was built between 1862 and 1863 to a design by Thomas Jeckyll, on a site donated by William Cozens-Hardy of Letheringsett Hall, who also paid most of the building costs.

The most recent religious building is the Chapel of Gresham's School, designed by Maxwell Ayrton and built in knapped flint and limestone between 1912 and 1916, with two angle turrets and an embattled parapet. This is now a Grade II listed building.

== Education ==
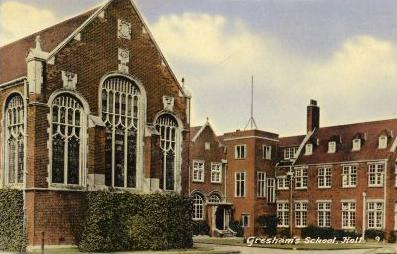
Big School, Gresham's

=== Gresham's School ===
Gresham's School, a public school founded in 1555 by Sir John Gresham, originally for boys but co-educational since 1971, is located on the north side of the town.

=== Other schools ===
Holt Community Primary School is a state primary school for children aged 4–11. The infant school was built in 1910 and the Junior School by 1928. In 1965 they were amalgamated to form Holt County Primary School. The school has been extended and developed over the years. It changed its name in 1999 to Holt Community Primary School.

There is no state secondary school in the town, so many children travel to Sheringham High School between the ages of 11 and 16.

== Local points of interest ==
=== Holt Hall ===
The hall, which stands in an 86-acre (35 ha) estate made up of ancient woodlands, lawns, lakes and gardens, was built in the 1840s and extended in the 1860s. It was owned by John Rogers, whose son Henry Burcham-Rogers inherited it from his father in 1906 and was still the owner when he died in 1945. A Grade II listed building, it was subsequently owned by Norfolk County Council, who used it as an outdoor education centre. In 2023, it was sold to Gresham's School, with funding from James Dyson, a former student, making the acquisition possible. In August 2024, despite objections from Historic England and The Victorian Society, the school was granted planning permission to demolish the north, services wing of the house and add a modern extension.

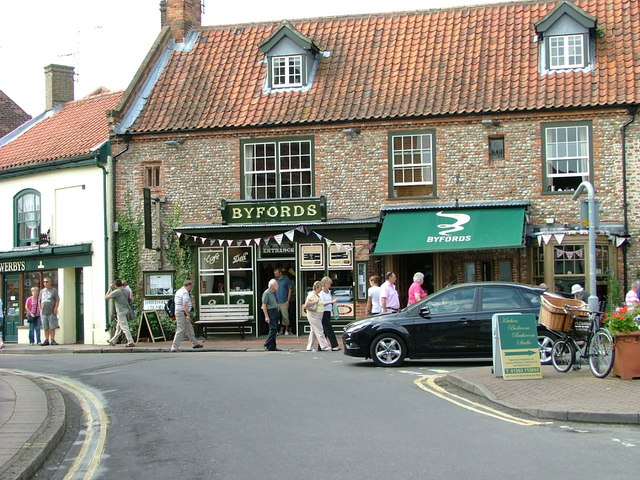
Byfords in 2012

=== Byfords ===
1–3 Shirehall Plain – The building is thought to be the oldest house in Holt (the cellar dates back to the 15th century), a survivor of the great fire of Holt in 1708 and a further fire in the building in 1906. The premises traded as a hardware shop or ironmonger's for over 100 years under the ownership of the Byford family. Byfords is now run as a café, delicatessen and B&B.

=== Blind Sam ===
Blind Sam is the name given locally to the Queen Victoria Jubilee Lantern located in Obelisk Plain. From the year of Victoria's Golden Jubilee in 1887 until 1921 it stood in the Market Place, where it had two functions, to provide light to the Market Place and to provide drinking water from two fountains at the bottom. The light was powered by the town's gas supply, which at the time was sporadic and unreliable, hence the nickname "Blind Sam". It was moved to Obelisk Plain in 1921 to make way for the war memorial. Made by ironmongers in Glasgow, it was restored in the 1990s.

=== Obelisk ===
The pineapple-topped obelisk at Holt is one of a pair of gateposts from Melton Constable Park, the other having been given to the town of Dereham in 1757. Each gatepost had the distances to various places from Holt and Dereham respectively carved into the stone. At the start of the Second World War, to avoid assisting the enemy in the event of invasion, the townspeople of Dereham dumped their obelisk down a deep well, where it remains to this day. The people of Holt whitewashed their obelisk at the start of the Second World War and it remains in good condition.

=== Chapel Yard ===
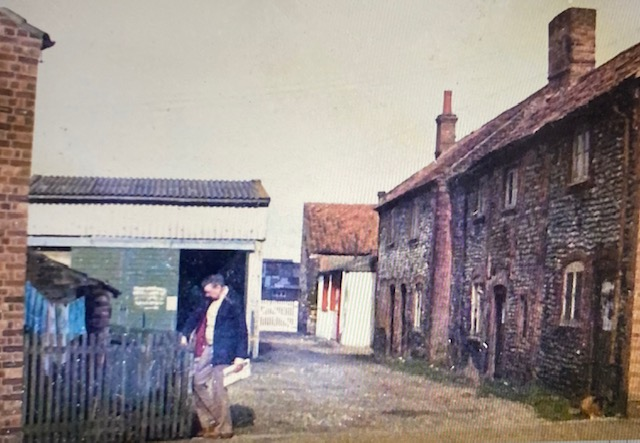
Chapel Yard in 1982: cottages 4, 5, 6 and 7 (right)

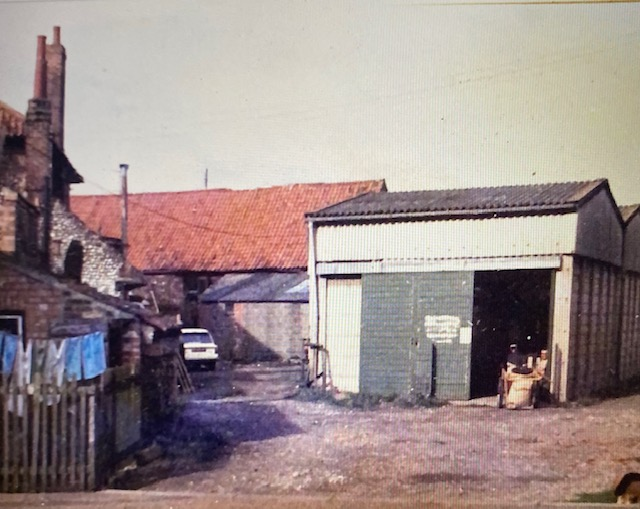
Chapel Yard in 1982: old drill hall, flint workers' cottages, now removed warehouses (right)

Chapel Yard, the first major retail development in Holt in modern times, was developed in 1983 within the conservation zone by architect Eric Goodman and Richard Webster, with removal of 1950s warehouses and adaptation of derelict flint workers' cottages, a chapel, the old fire station, and the reservists' drill hall. During renovations, Goodman discovered that the cottages at 3, 4, 5 and 6 Chapel Yard dated to the mid-16th century; they are the oldest known buildings in the conservation area and have since been given Grade II listed status. The massive chimney breasts have pockets for drying grain. Corn was discovered in pots during renovation.

Goodman added two new buildings with doors and windows inset behind a covered walkway and with pan tile roofs supported by oak buttresses, derived from a traditional 'Norfolk cart shed'. The model of a 'yard' of shops, making use of both small workers' cottages and redundant land, was later adopted for Apple Yard by Ru Bruce-Lockhart, who consulted Goodman on the design of his scheme, and for Lee's Yard, Feather Yard, Hoppers Yard and Franklyn's Yard. Goodman was also consulted on the design of a new supermarket in Holt, built in 1986 and also based on a Norfolk cart shed. The supermarket, now Budgen's, received the 1986 Graham Alan Award, an award from North Norfolk District Council which is given both for conservation and restoration and for well-designed new buildings, including those that make innovative use of traditional design forms and detailing.

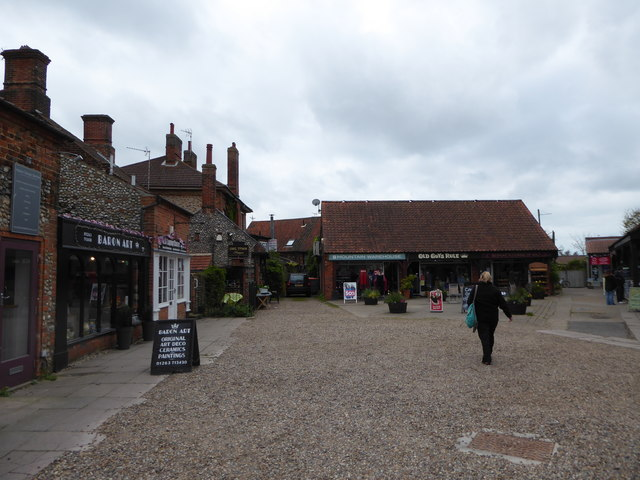
Chapel Yard in 2017

Chapel Yard itself did not receive the Graham Alan Award, because Graham Alan's son Mike Alan had consulted on the development. The judges instead sent a letter of recognition. The Norfolk Society awarded a certificate in March 1984. In addition, Historic England gave the buildings at 12 and 8 Albert Street Grade II listed status to protect the newly built environment; Goodman may be the only known design architect to receive such an accolade for a new development in North Norfolk. In 2022 the then MP for North Norfolk Duncan Baker recommended Goodman for an MBE. Chapel Yard is referenced as part of the 2021 Holt Conservation Appraisal and Management Plan.

== Former landmarks ==
=== Water tower ===
The town's water was pumped from the common land at Spout Hills to a brick water tower in Shirehall Plain. The tower was built in 1885 by Erpingham Rural Sanitary Authority and was 56 ft (17 m) high. It held 15,000 gallons of water; the water level could be read from the ground. The tower was in use until 1955 and was demolished in 1957.

=== Windmill ===
A brick-built windmill was erected in the late 18th century: when put up for sale in summer 1792 it was described as "newly built". It was used by many different owners until the early 1920s. The sails were removed in 1922 and the rest of the machinery was removed in the 1930s. The brick tower was then used for storage until deemed unsafe, and was demolished in the 1970s. There are now homes on the site, known as Mill Court.

== Amenities ==
=== Holt Country Park ===
Holt Country Park is a short walk from the town. Its history includes a horseracing course, heath, farmland, forestry and woodland garden. It is now woodland dominated with Scots pine and native broadleaves. Its rich ground flora supports wildlife including deer. The park has achieved a Green Flag Award every year since 2005.

=== Holt Lowes ===
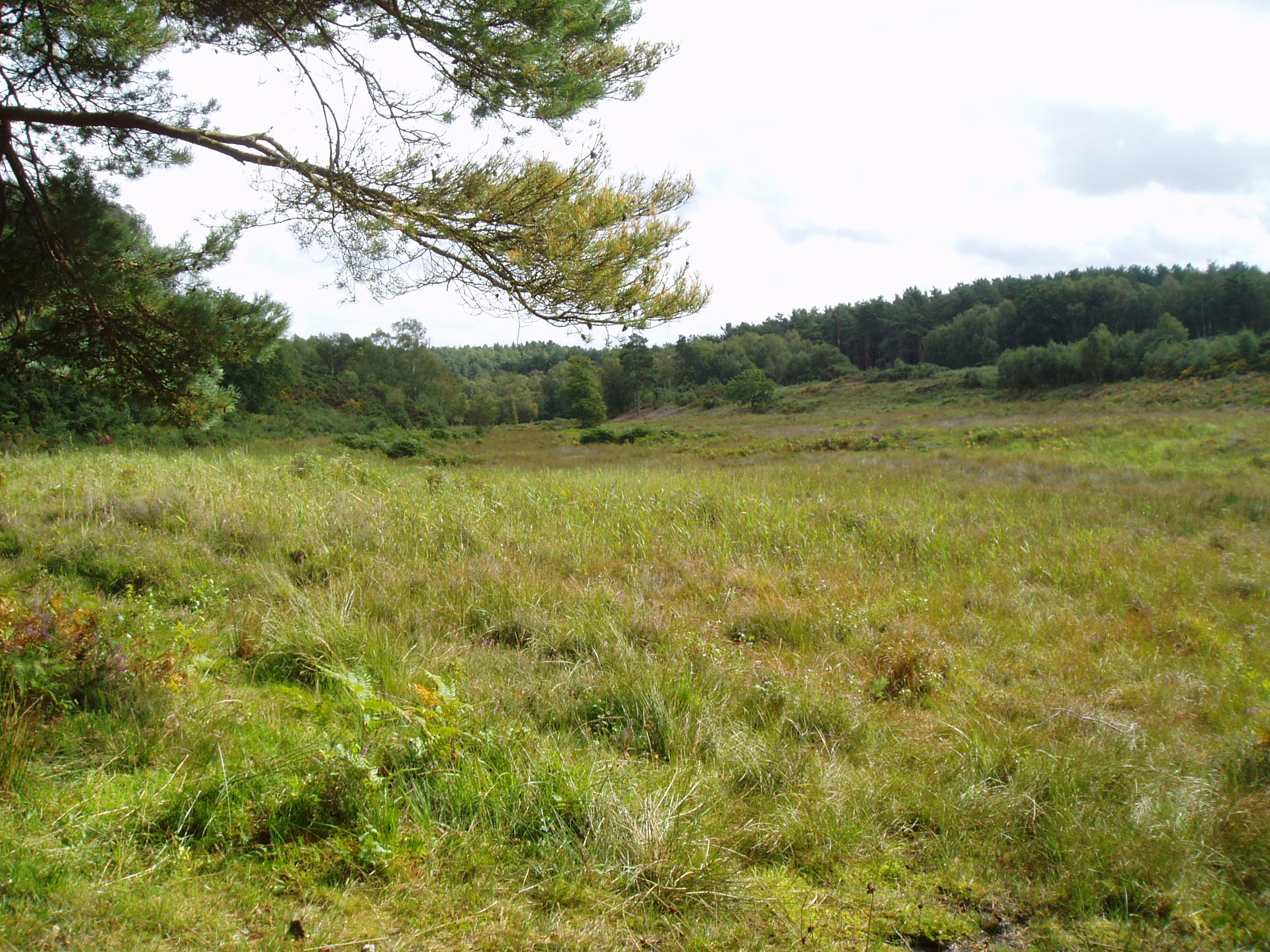
Holt Lowes

The Lowes is an area of heathland of around 120 acres (0.49 km^{2}) to the south of Holt set aside by the Holt and Letheringsett Inclosure Act 1807 (47 Geo. 3 Sess. 2. c. 19 Pr.). The poor of Holt had grazing rights for an animal and also had the right to take wood and gorse from the land for their own use. It is likely that the land was never used by the poor of Holt as the land was not wholly suitable. The Lowes was used for military training during the First World War. It is open to the public along with Holt Country Park. The Lowes has long been recognised as an important area for wildlife, with records going back to the 18th century. It was declared an SSSI in 1954 and for a while managed as a nature reserve by the Norfolk Wildlife Trust, which continues to act as managing agents for the trustees. As on all lowland heaths, there is a constant need for management to prevent the encroachment of trees. Recent work has concentrated on clearing a large part of the mixed valley mire, an area of sphagnum bog that supports plants like sundews and several species of dragonfly, including one, the keeled skimmer, found nowhere else in East Anglia.

=== Spout Hills ===
These consist of 14 acres (57,000 m^{2}) of green space, which provided the town of Holt with all of its water needs, enabling it to grow and flourish. An old reservoir still exists but the pumping station was dismantled in the 1950s.

=== Bakers & Larners ===
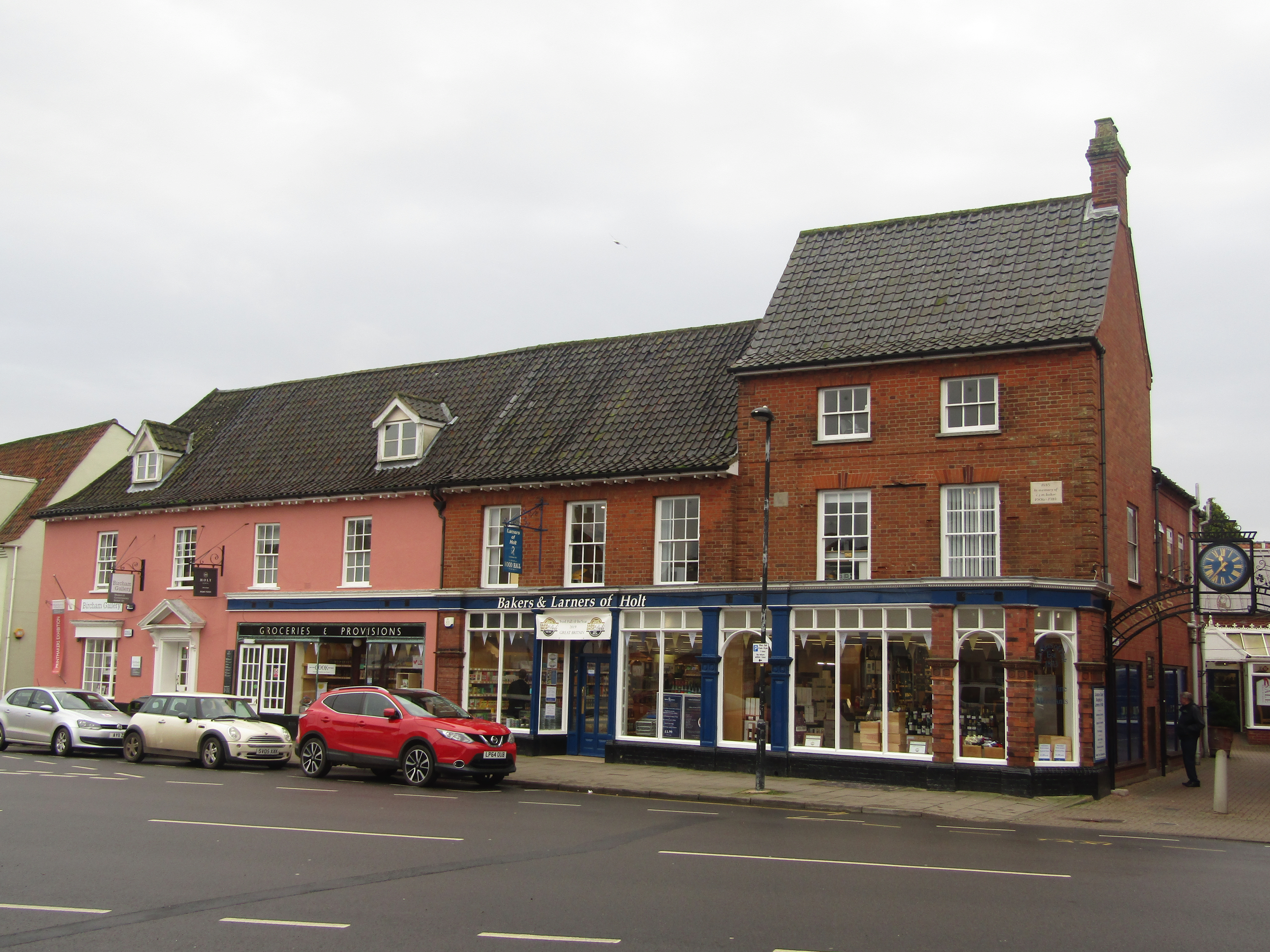
Bakers & Larners

Bakers & Larners is a department store located on Market Place. It has been continuously owned by the Baker family since the eighteenth century.

== Transport ==
=== Railway ===
The nearest railway station to Holt is in the town of Sheringham, where access to the National Rail network is provided by the Bittern Line to Norwich. Services are generally hourly and are operated by Greater Anglia.

==== History ====
Holt's original railway station, which opened in 1887, was served by the Midland & Great Northern Joint Railway. Most of this network was closed by British Railways in 1959, but the short section from Melton Constable via Holt to Sheringham (services continuing on to Cromer and Norwich) escaped closure for a few more years. It succumbed finally in 1964 when the branch was cut back to Sheringham, which is now the nearest national railway station. The station was later demolished and the site is now under the town's by-pass.

==== Heritage ====
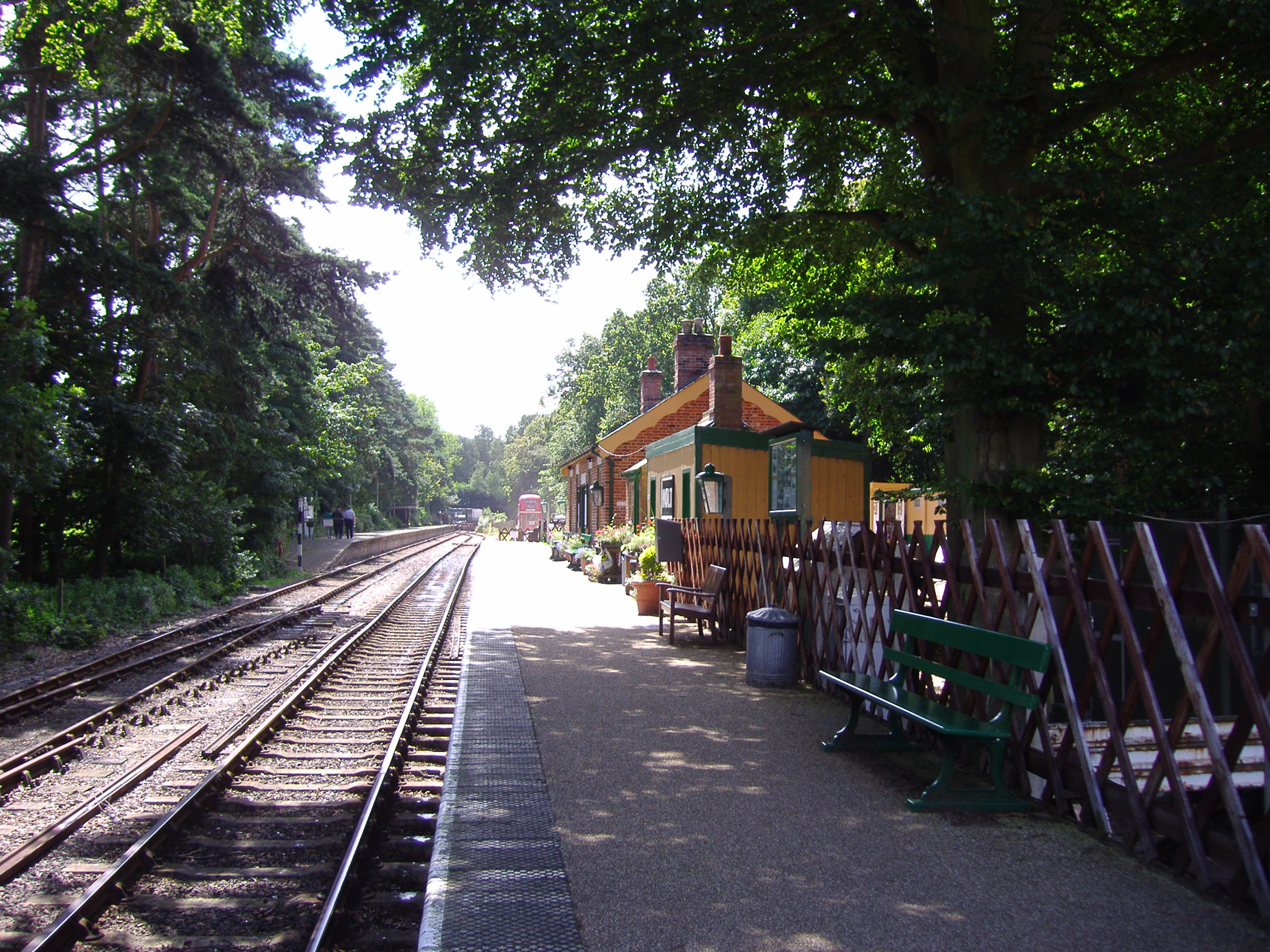
Holt's new heritage railway station

In 1965, within a year of the closure of the line, the North Norfolk Railway was formed to restore part of the line as an independent heritage steam railway. Initially, it operated between Sheringham and Weybourne; later, it was extended to the eastern edge of Holt at a new station site. A horse-drawn omnibus service, the Holt Flyer, once ran between the Railway Tavern in the town centre and the new railway station, timed to connect with trains; this has now been replaced by an AEC Routemaster bus.

==== Future ambitions ====
There are now plans by the Norfolk Orbital Railway to extend the railway back towards the town centre and on to Melton Constable and Fakenham.

=== Buses ===
Several local bus routes operate in and around Holt, provided by Sanders Coaches.

=== Roads ===
The town is on the route of the A148 King's Lynn to Cromer road.

=== Air ===
Norwich International Airport is sited in the northern outskirts of the city.

== Media ==
=== Television ===
Local news and television programmes are provided by BBC East and BBC Yorkshire and Lincolnshire on BBC One, and by ITV Anglia and ITV Yorkshire on ITV1. Television signals are received from either the Tacolneston or Belmont TV transmitters.

=== Radio ===
Local radio stations are BBC Radio Norfolk, Heart East, Amber Radio, Greatest Hits Radio East (formerly North Norfolk Radio) and Poppyland Community Radio, a community based station.

=== Newspapers ===
The town is served by the local newspapers, The Holt Chronicle, North Norfolk News and Eastern Daily Press.

== Festivals and cultural events ==
=== Holt Festival ===
The Holt Festival started in Summer 2009 as an arts festival. The events run for a week and include music, theatre, literature, cinema and art.

=== Doctor Who events ===
On Sunday 25 June 2006, Holt was "invaded" by Daleks. The event was a celebration of BBC Television's classic science fiction series Doctor Who. The Doctor Who Midsummer Invasion attracted many fans of the ever-popular show to the town as well as some of its previous stars. Organised by Planet Skaro, a local sci-fi store that has subsequently closed, the highlight of the day was a Dalek parade through the town centre.

Due to the success of the first Invasion, another science fiction themed event took place in Holt on 30 June 2007.

== Sport and recreation ==
Holt has a Rugby football club, formed in 1961. The club's first match was played against West Norfolk on Gresham's School playing field. In the early days the team used the White Lion Hotel (now closed) for their changing rooms and hospitality. In 1967 the club was able to purchase 9 acres (3.6 ha) of land on the eastern side of Bridge Road in nearby High Kelling. The club began playing their home games at their new facilities in 1969. At Bridge Road the club has three full-size pitches, six dedicated mini pitches and a clubhouse which was built in 1970. There are changing room facilities for up to 100 players. The club has three senior sides, a junior side and mini rugby sides for 6- to 18-year-olds.

Holt United Football Club was formed in 1894 and was a founder member of the North Norfolk and Norwich League, which began in 1895. In 1927 the club joined the Norwich and District League and went on to win this league on five occasions. In 1935 the club was in the Norfolk and Suffolk League and did not suffer a league defeat until December that year, when they lost to Norwich City A at Carrow Road. Holt was the first amateur team to play at the newly built Carrow Road ground. In 1985 Holt United left their ground at Jubilee Road, which was sold to finance the new Sports Centre complex on Kelling Road. For one season Holt played their matches at Gresham's School. In 1986 the club moved to their new ground at the Sports Centre. Four years later they dropped into junior football. During the past three seasons the club have remained in Division One of the Anglian Combination. At present Holt United runs three sides, the first team playing in the Anglian Combination and the Reserves and colts teams in the North East Norfolk League.

Holt Harlequins Hockey Club (formerly Cromer Hockey Club) plays at the astroturf ground at Gresham's School.

Holt has a King George's Field in memorial to King George V.

== Notable people ==
- Rex Malcolm Chaplin Dawson (1924–2021), biochemist
- Geoffrey Gillam (1905–1970), consultant cardiologist
- Dr Thomas Girdlestone (1758–1822), physician
- Sir John Gresham (1492–1556), merchant, founder of Gresham's School
- Sir Richard Gresham (1494–1549), merchant and member of parliament
- Billa Harrod (1911-2005), architectural conservationist
- John Holmes (1703–1760), educationist
- Logie Bruce Lockhart (born 1921 - 7 September 2020), writer and journalist
- Robert Pilch (1877–1957), footballer
- Sir Matthew Pinsent (born 1970), Olympic gold medallist in rowing
- Lewis Radford, Vicar of Holt, later Bishop of Goulburn in Australia
- Edmund Rogers (1823–1910), journalist and spiritualist
- Sebastian Shaw (1905–1994), actor
- Gareth Sibson (born 1977), writer and broadcaster
- Sir William Stanley (1435–1495), soldier, Lord Chamberlain
- Kieron Williamson (born 2002), landscape artist

== See also ==
- List of closed railway stations in Britain

== Bibliography ==
- Lewis Radford, History of Holt. A Brief Study of Parish, Church and School (Holt: Rounce & Wortley, 1908)
- Peter Brooks, Holt, Georgian Market Town (Cromer: Poppyland Publishing, second edition 2001, ISBN 0-946148-53-8)
