= David Pilch =

English cricketer (1943–2023)

Personal information
- Full name: David George Pilch
- Born: 2 February 1943; West Kirby, Cheshire, England
- Died: 28 September 2023 (aged 80)
- Batting: Right-handed
- Bowling: Right-arm medium
- Relatives: Robert Pilch (grandfather); William Pilch (great-great uncle)

Domestic team information
- Years: Team
- 1961–1983: Norfolk
- 1974–1975: Minor Counties North

Career statistics
Competition	List A
Matches	8
Runs scored	52
Batting average	7.42
100s/50s	0/0
Top score	20*
Balls bowled	330
Wickets	11
Bowling average	24.45
5 wickets in innings	0
10 wickets in match	0
Best bowling	3/15
Catches/stumpings	0/–
- Source: Cricinfo, 26 November 2023

David George Pilch (2 February 1943 – 28 September 2023) was an English cricketer. Pilch was a right-handed batsman who bowled right-arm medium pace. Outside of cricket, Pilch played hockey at county level for Norfolk. He was born in West Kirby, Cheshire.

Pilch made his debut for Norfolk in the 1961 Minor Counties Championship against Staffordshire. Pilch played Minor counties cricket for Norfolk from 1961 to 1983, which included 215 Minor Counties Championship appearances and a single MCCA Knockout Trophy appearance. He made his List A debut against Hampshire in the 1965 Gillette Cup. He made four further List A appearances for Norfolk, the last coming against Glamorgan in the 1983 NatWest Trophy. Primarily a bowler, Pilch took nine wickets in List A cricket for Norfolk, which came at an average of 20.00, with best figures of 3/15.

Playing for Norfolk allowed him to represent Minor Counties North, with Pilch making his debut for the team against Nottinghamshire in the 1974 Benson & Hedges Cup. He made two further List A appearances for the team, against Yorkshire and Nottinghamshire in the 1975 Benson & Hedges Cup. With the ball, he took two wickets for the team, which came at an average of 44.50, with best figures of 1/38.

His father, George Pilch, played Minor Counties cricket for Norfolk, his grandfather, Robert Pilch, played football for Tottenham Hotspur, Everton and Norwich City, and his great-great uncle, William Pilch, played first-class cricket for Kent County Cricket Club.

Pilch died on 28 September 2023, aged 80.
