= Listed buildings in Swaffham =

Non-Civil Parish in Norfolk, England

Swaffham is a town and civil parish in the Breckland District of Norfolk, England. It contains 103 listed buildings that are recorded in the National Heritage List for England. Of these two are grade I, two are grade II* and 99 are grade II.

This list is based on the information retrieved online from Historic England.

== Key ==
Grade	Criteria
I	Buildings that are of exceptional interest
II*	Particularly important buildings of more than special interest
II	Buildings that are of special interest

== Listing ==
Name	Grade	Location	Type	Completed (Note: The date given is the date used by Historic England as significant for the initial building or that of an important part in the structure's description.)	Date designated	Grid ref. (Note: The grid reference is based on the British national grid reference system, sometimes known as OSGB36, used by the Ordnance Survey.) Geo-coordinates	Notes	Entry number (Note: The "List Entry Number" is a unique number assigned to each listed building and scheduled monument by Historic England.)	Image	Wikidata
1 London Street	II	1 London Street, PE37 7DD			17 January 1973	TF8200908851; 52°38′49″N 0°41′20″E		1269633	Upload Photo	Q26559735
Assembly Rooms	II	1 Market Place, PE37 7AB			17 January 1973	TF8192108964; 52°38′52″N 0°41′16″E		1269613	Upload Photo	Q26559717
2 Market Place	II	2 Market Place, PE37 7AB			17 January 1973	TF8191208976; 52°38′53″N 0°41′15″E		1269614	Upload Photo	Q26559718
The White Hart	II	2 London Street, PE37 7DG	pub		17 January 1973	TF8196108849; 52°38′49″N 0°41′18″E		1269634	The White Hart More images	Q26559736
London House, 3 Market Place	II	3 Market Place, PE37 7AB			17 January 1973	TF8190208986; 52°38′53″N 0°41′15″E		1269615	Upload Photo	Q26559719
4 Market Place	II	4 Market Place, PE37 7AB			17 January 1973	TF8191009018; 52°38′54″N 0°41′15″E		1269616	Upload Photo	Q26559720
Town Hall and Attached Front Railings	II	4 London Street, PE37 7DQ	city hall		17 January 1973	TF8196808836; 52°38′48″N 0°41′18″E		1269635	Town Hall and Attached Front Railings More images	Q26559737
5 and 7 London Street	II	5 and 7 London Street, PE37 7DD			17 January 1973	TF8201608819; 52°38′48″N 0°41′20″E		1269636	Upload Photo	Q26559738
Former Corn Hall, 7 Market Place	II	7 Market Place, PE37 7AB	corn exchange		17 January 1973	TF8196509007; 52°38′54″N 0°41′18″E		1269617	Former Corn Hall, 7 Market Place More images	Q26559721
8, 8a and 8b Market Place	II	8, 8a and 8b Market Place, PE37 7AB			17 January 1973	TF8193209018; 52°38′54″N 0°41′16″E		1269619	Upload Photo	Q26559723
9 London Street	II	9 London Street, PE37 7DD			17 January 1973	TF8201908806; 52°38′47″N 0°41′21″E		1269637	Upload Photo	Q26559739
9 Market Place	II	9 Market Place, PE37 7AB			17 January 1973	TF8193409005; 52°38′54″N 0°41′16″E		1269620	Upload Photo	Q26559724
10 Market Place	II	10 Market Place, PE37 7AB			17 January 1973	TF8194009000; 52°38′54″N 0°41′17″E		1269621	Upload Photo	Q26559725
11 and 12 Market Place	II	11 and 12 Market Place, PE37 7AB			17 January 1973	TF8194308989; 52°38′53″N 0°41′17″E		1269622	Upload Photo	Q26559726
Ventnor House, 11 London Street	II	11 London Street, PE37 7BW			17 January 1973	TF8202208795; 52°38′47″N 0°41′21″E		1269638	Upload Photo	Q26559740
13 Market Place	II	13 Market Place, PE37 7AB			17 January 1973	TF8194508976; 52°38′53″N 0°41′17″E		1269623	Upload Photo	Q26559727
Westgate and Fernside, London Street	II	13 and 15 London Street, PE37 7DD			17 January 1973	TF8202508775; 52°38′46″N 0°41′21″E		1269639	Upload Photo	Q26559741
14 Market Place	II	14 Market Place, PE37 7AB			17 January 1973	TF8195408974; 52°38′53″N 0°41′17″E		1269624	Upload Photo	Q26559728
15 Market Place	II	15 Market Place, PE37 7AB			4 September 1972	TF8194708970; 52°38′53″N 0°41′17″E		1269625	Upload Photo	Q26559729
16 and 18 London Street	II	16 and 18 London Street, PE37 7DG			17 January 1973	TF8199808784; 52°38′47″N 0°41′19″E		1269640	Upload Photo	Q26559742
Oakleigh House	II*	16 Market Place, PE37 7QH	house		10 January 1951	TF8183109010; 52°38′54″N 0°41′11″E		1269627	Oakleigh House More images	Q17553743
Gate Piers and Flanking Walls North of 18 Market Place	II	18 Market Place, PE37 7QH			17 January 1973	TF8184709004; 52°38′54″N 0°41′12″E		1269588	Upload Photo	Q26559692
19, 19a and 19b Market Place	II	19, 19a and 19b Market Place, PE37 7LA			17 January 1973	TF8181509058; 52°38′56″N 0°41′10″E		1269585	Upload Photo	Q26559689
20 London Street	II	20 London Street, PE37 7DG			17 January 1973	TF8199908778; 52°38′46″N 0°41′19″E		1269642	Upload Photo	Q26559744
21 and 23 Market Place	II	21-23 Market Place, PE37 7LA	pub		17 January 1973	TF8183909051; 52°38′55″N 0°41′12″E		1269589	21 and 23 Market Place More images	Q26559693
22-23 Market Place and 1-8 Plowright Place	II	22-23 Market Place And 1-8 Plowright Place			17 January 1973	TF8191608921; 52°38′51″N 0°41′15″E		1269599	Upload Photo	Q26559703
25 and 25a Market Place	II	25 and 25a Market Place, PE37 7LA			17 January 1973	TF8185009050; 52°38′55″N 0°41′12″E		1269590	Upload Photo	Q26559694
26, 28 and 30 Market Place	II	26, 28, 30 Market Place, PE37 7QH			10 January 1951	TF8188308957; 52°38′52″N 0°41′14″E		1269591	Upload Photo	Q26559695
27 and 27a Market Place (currently Listed As 27 Market Place)	II	27 and 27a Market Place, PE37 7LA			17 January 1973	TF8185809050; 52°38′55″N 0°41′13″E		1269592	Upload Photo	Q26559696
29 Market Place	II	29 Market Place, PE37 7LA			17 January 1973	TF8186909049; 52°38′55″N 0°41′13″E		1269593	Upload Photo	Q26559697
31, 31b and 31c Market Place	II	31, 31b and 31c Market Place, PE37 7LA			17 January 1973	TF8188309051; 52°38′55″N 0°41′14″E		1269594	Upload Photo	Q26559698
Fitzroy House	II	32 Market Place, PE37 7QH			10 January 1951	TF8189608938; 52°38′52″N 0°41′14″E		1269595	Upload Photo	Q26559699
33 Market Place	II	33 Market Place, PE37 7LA			17 January 1973	TF8188809050; 52°38′55″N 0°41′14″E		1269596	Upload Photo	Q26559700
34 and 34a Market Place	II	34 Market Place, PE37 7QH			17 January 1973	TF8190308931; 52°38′51″N 0°41′15″E		1269597	Upload Photo	Q26559701
35 Market Place	II	35 Market Place, PE37 7LA			17 January 1973	TF8189509052; 52°38′55″N 0°41′14″E		1269598	Upload Photo	Q26559702
38 Market Place	II	38 Market Place, PE37 7QH			17 January 1973	TF8193108898; 52°38′50″N 0°41′16″E		1269600	Upload Photo	Q26559704
39 and 41 Market Place	II	39 and 41 Market Place, PE37 7LA			10 January 1951	TF8191809056; 52°38′55″N 0°41′16″E		1269601	Upload Photo	Q26559705
46 and 48 Market Place	II	46 and 48 Market Place, PE37 7QH			17 January 1973	TF8194508876; 52°38′50″N 0°41′17″E		1269602	Upload Photo	Q26559706
50, 50a and 50b Market Place	II	50, 50a and 50b Market Place, PE37 7QH			17 January 1973	TF8195108865; 52°38′49″N 0°41′17″E		1269603	Upload Photo	Q26559707
53, 55 and 57 Market Place	II	53-57 Market Place, PE37 7LE			17 January 1973	TF8197009066; 52°38′56″N 0°41′19″E		1269604	Upload Photo	Q26559708
Cranglegate, 59 Market Place	II	59 Market Place, PE37 7LE			10 January 1951	TF8197809076; 52°38′56″N 0°41′19″E		1269605	Upload Photo	Q26559709
63 Market Place	II	63 Market Place, PE37 7AQ			17 January 1973	TF8199209037; 52°38′55″N 0°41′20″E		1269563	Upload Photo	Q26559668
83 and 83a Market Place	II	83 and 83a Market Place, PE37 7AQ			17 January 1973	TF8199208958; 52°38′52″N 0°41′19″E		1269564	Upload Photo	Q26559669
85 Market Place	II	85 Market Place, PE37 7AQ			17 January 1973	TF8199708950; 52°38′52″N 0°41′20″E		1269565	Upload Photo	Q26559670
Red Lion	II	87 Market Place, PE37 7AQ	pub		17 January 1973	TF8199808942; 52°38′52″N 0°41′20″E		1269566	Red Lion More images	Q26559671
Montpelier House and Western House, 89 and 91 Market Place	II	89 and 91 Market Place, PE37 7AQ			29 March 1950	TF8199908915; 52°38′51″N 0°41′20″E		1269567	Upload Photo	Q26559672
93 and 95 Market Place	II	93 and 95 Market Place, PE37 7AQ			17 January 1973	TF8200008902; 52°38′50″N 0°41′20″E		1269568	Upload Photo	Q26559673
The Greyhound Inn	II	97 Market Place, PE37 7AQ	pub		17 January 1973	TF8200508888; 52°38′50″N 0°41′20″E		1269569	The Greyhound Inn More images	Q26559674
15a Market Place	II	15a Market Place, PE37 7AB			17 January 1973	TF8193808967; 52°38′53″N 0°41′17″E		1269626	Upload Photo	Q26559730
18 Market Place	II	PE37 7QH			10 January 1951	TF8184808992; 52°38′53″N 0°41′12″E		1269586	Upload Photo	Q26559690
20 Market Place	II	PE37 7QH			10 January 1951	TF8185508984; 52°38′53″N 0°41′12″E		1269587	Upload Photo	Q26559691
Swaffham Market Cross	I	PE37 7AB	market cross		10 January 1951	TF8195908910; 52°38′51″N 0°41′18″E		1269570	Swaffham Market Cross More images	Q17535110
Strattons Hotel	II	4, Ash Close			17 January 1973	TF8188009123; 52°38′58″N 0°41′14″E		1269666	Upload Photo	Q26559768
The Shirehall	II	1-16, Beech Close	architectural structure		17 January 1973	TF8212808644; 52°38′42″N 0°41′26″E		1269667	The Shirehall More images	Q26559769
The Church Rooms	II	Camping Land	architectural structure		17 January 1973	TF8216308831; 52°38′48″N 0°41′28″E		1269668	The Church Rooms More images	Q26559770
Church of St Peter and St Paul	I	Church Lane	church building		10 January 1951	TF8208808999; 52°38′53″N 0°41′25″E		1269628	Church of St Peter and St Paul More images	Q17535123
Gates to Churchyard of St Peter and St Paul	II	Church Lane			19 October 1995	TF8200908992; 52°38′53″N 0°41′20″E		1269629	Upload Photo	Q26559731
10, Cley Road	II	10, Cley Road			19 October 1995	TF8189408812; 52°38′48″N 0°41′14″E		1269630	Upload Photo	Q26559732
12, Cley Road	II	12, Cley Road			19 October 1995	TF8188608805; 52°38′47″N 0°41′14″E		1269631	Upload Photo	Q26559733
York House	II	15, Cley Road			19 October 1995	TF8187108762; 52°38′46″N 0°41′13″E		1269632	Upload Photo	Q26559734
Shirley House	II	23, London House			10 January 1951	TF8203308738; 52°38′45″N 0°41′21″E		1269643	Upload Photo	Q26559745
Thornton House	II	17, London Street			17 January 1973	TF8202808757; 52°38′46″N 0°41′21″E		1269641	Upload Photo	Q26559743
25, London Street	II	25, London Street			19 October 1995	TF8203408722; 52°38′44″N 0°41′21″E		1269644	Upload Photo	Q26559746
27, London Street	II	27, London Street			19 October 1995	TF8203708710; 52°38′44″N 0°41′21″E		1269645	Upload Photo	Q26559747
39, London Street	II	39, London Street			19 October 1995	TF8208908680; 52°38′43″N 0°41′24″E		1269646	Upload Photo	Q26559748
40, 42 and 44, London Street	II	40, 42 and 44, London Street			19 October 1995	TF8203008661; 52°38′43″N 0°41′21″E		1269647	Upload Photo	Q26559749
Holly House Flats A-g	II	62, London Street			15 July 1996	TF8205408576; 52°38′40″N 0°41′22″E		1269648	Upload Photo	Q26559750
Boundary Wall South of Number 62 (holly House)	II	London Street			17 January 1973	TF8206608550; 52°38′39″N 0°41′23″E		1269649	Upload Photo	Q26559751
Swaffham Methodist Church	II	London Street, PE37 7DD			17 January 1973	TF8201808840; 52°38′48″N 0°41′21″E		1269606	Upload Photo	Q26559710
4-16, Lynn Street	II	4-16, Lynn Street			17 January 1973	TF8178109082; 52°38′56″N 0°41′08″E		1269607	Upload Photo	Q26559711
Swaffham War Memorial	II	Lynn Street	war memorial		6 November 2019	TF8195209026; 52°38′54″N 0°41′17″E		1466754	Swaffham War Memorial More images	Q97362661
Church Cottage	II	6, Mangate Street			17 January 1973	TF8210909043; 52°38′55″N 0°41′26″E		1269608	Upload Photo	Q26559712
Barn and Stock Houses with Enclosing Wall North West of Manor Farmhouse	II	Mangate Street			17 January 1973	TF8220309119; 52°38′57″N 0°41′31″E		1269610	Upload Photo	Q26559714
Manor Farmhouse Including Attached Wing to North	II	Mangate Street			10 January 1951	TF8226709048; 52°38′55″N 0°41′34″E		1269609	Upload Photo	Q26559713
Stable Block and Cart Shed North West of Manor Farmhouse	II	Mangate Street			17 January 1973	TF8225309088; 52°38′56″N 0°41′34″E		1269611	Upload Photo	Q26559715
Town Pound	II	Mangate Street			19 October 1995	TF8209509049; 52°38′55″N 0°41′25″E		1269612	Upload Photo	Q26559716
Front Wall to North of Numbers 16 and 18 Oakleigh House	II	Market Place			17 January 1973	TF8182209029; 52°38′55″N 0°41′11″E		1269584	Upload Photo	Q26559688
K6 Telephone Kiosk to the North of the Former Corn Hall	II	Market Place, PE37 7AB			25 July 1989	TF8196409025; 52°38′54″N 0°41′18″E		1269618	Upload Photo	Q26559722
Crown Cottage	II	North Pickenham Road			19 October 1995	TF8279208527; 52°38′37″N 0°42′01″E		1269571	Upload Photo	Q26559675
Wood Farmhouse	II	North Pickenham Road			19 October 1995	TF8279908644; 52°38′41″N 0°42′02″E		1269572	Upload Photo	Q26559676
Beech House	II	Northwell Pool Road			17 January 1973	TF8201709263; 52°39′02″N 0°41′21″E		1269573	Upload Photo	Q26559677
Gradys Hotel	II	Norwich Road			17 January 1973	TF8233508836; 52°38′48″N 0°41′37″E		1269574	Upload Photo	Q26559678
Manor House Including Attached Service Range to East	II*	Norwich Road			17 January 1973	TF8241909030; 52°38′54″N 0°41′42″E		1269575	Upload Photo	Q17553722
Churchyard Walls East of White Lodge Including Churchyard Gates at East End	II	St Peters Churchyard			17 January 1973	TF8214108960; 52°38′52″N 0°41′27″E		1269577	Upload Photo	Q26559680
Churchyard Walls to West of White Lodge	II	St Peters Churchyard			17 January 1973	TF8203208945; 52°38′52″N 0°41′22″E		1269578	Upload Photo	Q26559681
White Lodge	II	St Peters Churchyard			17 January 1973	TF8205608942; 52°38′52″N 0°41′23″E		1269576	Upload Photo	Q26559679
George Hotel	II	1 and 3, Station Street	hotel		17 January 1973	TF8200609096; 52°38′57″N 0°41′20″E		1269579	George Hotel More images	Q5540760
Eversley House	II	8, Station Street			17 January 1973	TF8197909117; 52°38′57″N 0°41′19″E		1269580	Upload Photo	Q26559683
12, Station Street	II	12, Station Street			17 January 1973	TF8197509144; 52°38′58″N 0°41′19″E		1269581	Upload Photo	Q26559684
14, Station Street	II	14, Station Street			17 January 1973	TF8197609152; 52°38′58″N 0°41′19″E		1269582	Upload Photo	Q26559686
Fincham House	II	15, Station Street			17 January 1973	TF8199209161; 52°38′59″N 0°41′20″E		1269583	Upload Photo	Q26559687
17, 17a and 19, Station Street	II	17, 17a and 19, Station Street			17 January 1973	TF8199009178; 52°38′59″N 0°41′20″E		1269541	Upload Photo	Q26559647
White Lion Inn	II	20, Station Street			17 January 1973	TF8197409168; 52°38′59″N 0°41′19″E		1269542	Upload Photo	Q26559648
21, Station Street	II	21, Station Street			17 January 1973	TF8199009186; 52°39′00″N 0°41′20″E		1269543	Upload Photo	Q26559649
Orwell House	II	22, Station Street			17 January 1973	TF8197409192; 52°39′00″N 0°41′19″E		1269544	Upload Photo	Q26559650
Glaisdale	II	23, Station Street			17 January 1973	TF8199009194; 52°39′00″N 0°41′20″E		1269545	Upload Photo	Q26559651
Aston House and Dalton House	II	24, Station Street			10 January 1951	TF8195909209; 52°39′00″N 0°41′18″E		1269546	Upload Photo	Q26559652
Point House	II	25, Station Street			17 January 1973	TF8199409264; 52°39′02″N 0°41′20″E		1269548	Upload Photo	Q26559654
Baptist Chapel and Hall	II	Station Street			19 October 1995	TF8194309317; 52°39′04″N 0°41′18″E		1269549	Upload Photo	Q26559655
Boundary Walls to East and North of Numbers 24 and 26	II	Station Street			17 January 1973	TF8197609214; 52°39′00″N 0°41′19″E		1269547	Upload Photo	Q26559653
Carol House	II	Watton Road			19 October 1995	TF8308307051; 52°37′49″N 0°42′14″E		1269550	Upload Photo	Q26559656
Holmwood House	II	White Cross Road			25 March 1996	TF8237608623; 52°38′41″N 0°41′39″E		1269551	Upload Photo	Q26559657
Gate Piers to Whitsands Road and Boundary Wall South-west of 20 Market Place	II	Whitsands Road, PE37 7BY			17 January 1973	TF8178808948; 52°38′52″N 0°41′09″E		1269552	Upload Photo	Q26559658

== See also ==
- Grade I listed buildings in Norfolk
- Grade II* listed buildings in Norfolk

== Sources ==
- Wilson, Bill; Pevsner, Nikolaus (1999) [1962], Norfolk 2: North-West and South, The Buildings of England, New Haven and London: Yale University Press, ISBN 978-0-300-09657-6
