= Nathaniel Pilch =

English cricketer

Personal information
- Born: 4 September 1793; Brisley, Norfolk
- Died: 1881 (aged 87–88); Erpingham, Norfolk
- Relatives: Fuller Pilch (brother); William Pilch (brother); William Pilch (son)

Domestic team information
- Years: Team
- 1820–1836: Norfolk
- Source: CricketArchive, 30 March 2013

Nathaniel Pilch (4 September 1793 – 1881) was an English cricketer who played for Norfolk from 1820 to 1836. He was the elder brother of Fuller Pilch. Pilch is recorded in six matches, totalling 173 runs with a highest score of 52, holding 6 catches and taking 3 wickets.

== Bibliography ==
- Haygarth, Arthur (1862). Scores & Biographies, Volume 1 (1744–1826). Lillywhite.
