= Brisley =

Village in Norfolk, England

Coordinates: 52.755°N 0.888°E

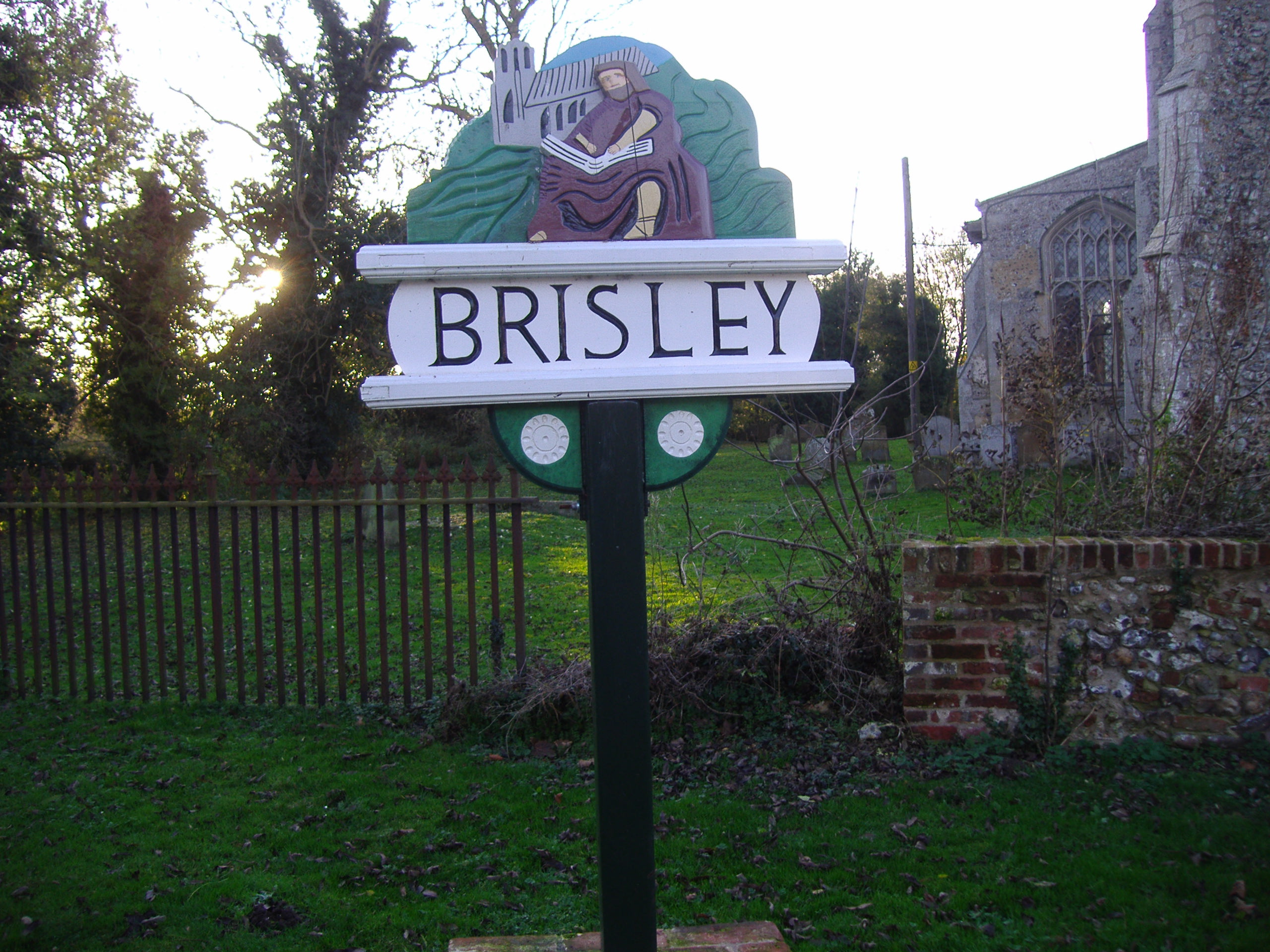
- Brisley Village Sign

- Location within Norfolk
- Area: 4.90 km^{2} (1.89 sq mi)
- Population: 296 (2021)
  - Density: 60/km^{2} (160/sq mi)
- OS grid reference: TF950214
- District: Breckland
- Shire county: Norfolk
- Region: East
- Country: England
- Sovereign state: United Kingdom
- Post town: DEREHAM
- Postcode district: NR20
- Dialling code: 01362
- Police: Norfolk
- Fire: Norfolk
- Ambulance: East of England
- UK Parliament: Mid Norfolk
- Website: http://www.brisleyvillage.co.uk/

Brisley is a village and civil parish in the English county of Norfolk. It is 6 miles (9.7 km) north of Dereham and 19 miles (31 km) north-west of Norwich.

== History ==
Brisley's name is of Anglo-Saxon origin but it does not appear in the Domesday Book.

In 1898, a Methodist chapel was built in Brisley. It has been converted into a private dwelling.

In 1942, a Bristol Blenheim of No. 84 Squadron RAF crashed in the village pond after a raid on Cologne during Operation Millenium. All three crewmembers were killed and a small memorial was erected in their honour.

== Geography ==
At the 2021 census, Brisley has a population of 296, a slight increase from the 2011 census.

The junction between the B1145, between King's Lynn and Mundesley, and the B1146, between Fakenham and Dereham, is located in the village.

Amenities within the village include Brisly Bell public house. Brisley Cricket Club play home matches on the village green.

== St. Bartholomew's Church ==
Brisley's parish church is dedicated to Saint Bartholomew and dates from the 15th century. It was built in the perpendicular gothic style and includes wall paintings of Saint Andrew and Saint Christopher as well as a set of royal arms from the reign of King George II and a stained-glass depiction of the crucifixion of Christ designed by Charles Clutterbuck. The crypt was used as a holding cell for prisoners on their way to Norwich.

== Notable people ==
- Richard Taverner (1505–1575) author and religious dissenter, born in Brisley.
- Nathaniel Pilch (1793–1881) Norfolk cricketer, born in Brisley.
- Fuller Pilch (1804–1870) Norfolk and Kent cricketer, grew-up in Brisley.
- George Englebright (1805–1877) Norfolk cricketer, died in Brisley.
- Edward Ash (1842–1909) schoolmaster and Cambridge University cricketer, born in Brisley.
