= Horningtoft =

Village in Norfolk, England

Coordinates: 52.771°N 0.868°E

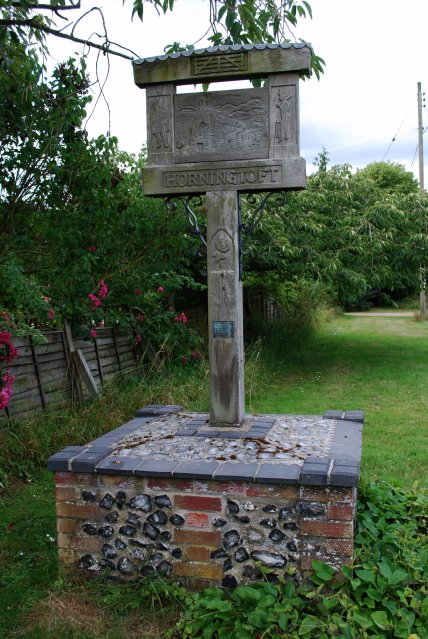
- Horningtoft Village Sign

- Location within Norfolk
- Area: 2.21 sq mi (5.7 km^{2})
- Population: 157 (2021 census)
  - Density: 71/sq mi (27/km^{2})
- OS grid reference: TF935231
- Civil parish: Horningtoft
- District: Breckland
- Shire county: Norfolk
- Region: East
- Country: England
- Sovereign state: United Kingdom
- Post town: DEREHAM
- Postcode district: NR20
- Dialling code: 01328
- UK Parliament: Mid Norfolk
- Website: http://horningtoft.org.uk/parishcouncil.html

Horningtoft is a village and civil parish in the English county of Norfolk.

Horningtoft is located 8 miles (13 km) north of Dereham and 21 miles (34 km) north-west of Norwich.

== History ==
Horningtoft's name is of Anglo-Saxon origin and derives from the Old English for the curtilage of the people of the horn.

In the Domesday Book, Horningtoft is listed as a settlement of 16 households in the hundred of Laundich. In 1086, the village was part of the East Anglian estates of King William I.

== Geography ==
According to the 2021 census, Horningtoft has a population of 157 people which shows an increase from the 127 people recorded in the 2011 census.

== St. Edmund's Church ==
Horningtoft's parish church is dedicated to Saint Edmund the Martyr and dates from the Thirteenth Century. St. Edmund's is located on Church Road and has been Grade II listed since 1984. The church no longer holds Sunday service but is part of the Upper Wensum Benefice.

St. Edmund's Churchtower collapsed in the late Eighteenth Century.

== Governance ==
Horningtoft is part of the electoral ward of Hermitage for local elections and is part of the district of Breckland.

The village's national constituency is Mid Norfolk which has been represented by the Conservative's George Freeman MP since 2010.

== Notable residents ==
- Fuller Pilch- (1804-1870) Norfolk and Kent cricketer, born in Horningtoft.

== War Memorial ==
Horningtoft's war memorials are two brass plaques in St. Edmund's Church which list the following names for the First World War:

Rank	Name	Unit	Date of death	Burial/Commemoration
Pte.	Thomas Annison	15th Bn., Queen's Royal Regiment	4 Feb. 1917	St. Edmund's Churchyard
Pte.	Miles Riches	11th Bn., Suffolk Regiment	22 Mar. 1918	Arras Memorial

The following names were added after the Second World War:

Rank	Name	Unit	Date of death	Burial/Commemoration
LCpl.	Alfred W. Makins	6th Bn., Queen's Own Royal Regiment	15 Apr. 1943	Medjez-El-Bab Memorial
Pte.	Laura M. Collinson	Auxiliary Territorial Service	29 Apr. 1944	Fakenham Cemetery
