= William Pilch (cricketer, born 1820) =

English cricketer (1820–1882)

Personal information
- Born: 18 June 1820; Brinton, Norfolk, England
- Died: 11 January 1882 (aged 61); Canterbury, Kent, England
- Batting: Right-handed
- Relatives: Nathaniel Pilch (father); Fuller Pilch (uncle); William Pilch (uncle); David Pilch (great-great-nephew)

Domestic team information
- Years: Team
- 1840–1854: Kent

Career statistics
Competition	First-class
Matches	52
Runs scored	719
Batting average	8.07
100s/50s	0/0
Top score	38
Balls bowled	88
Wickets	17
Bowling average	6.60
5 wickets in innings	0
10 wickets in match	0
Best bowling	3/7
Catches/stumpings	33/–
- Source: CricketArchive, 25 April 2020

William Pilch (18 June 1820 – 11 January 1882) was an English cricketer who played first-class cricket for Kent County Cricket Club, the Players, teams calling themselves "England" and other teams in a professional cricket career that extended from 1840 to 1857. He was a member of a famous cricketing family: his father was Nathaniel Pilch, and the great Fuller Pilch and an older William Pilch were his uncles. He was born at Brinton, Norfolk and died at Canterbury, Kent.

== Bibliography ==
- Carlaw, Derek (2020). Kent County Cricketers, A to Z: Part One (1806–1914) (PDF). Cardiff: ACS.
