= Fuller Pilch =

English cricketer (1804-1870)

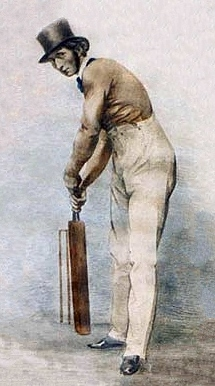

Personal information
- Born: 17 March 1804; Horningtoft, Norfolk, England
- Died: 1 May 1870 (aged 66); Canterbury, Kent, England
- Height: 6 ft 1/2 in (1.84 m)
- Batting: Right-handed
- Bowling: Right arm slow

Domestic team information
- Years: Team
- 1820–1836: Norfolk
- 1830–1847: Suffolk
- 1830–1844: Surrey
- 1836–1854: Kent
- 1837–1842: Sussex
- 1842–1845: Hampshire

Fuller Pilch (17 March 1804 – 1 May 1870) was an English cricketer active from 1820 to 1854. He was a right-handed batsman who bowled at a slow pace with a roundarm action. Pilch played in a total of 229 important matches for a large number of teams, although he appeared most frequently for the Kent County cricket team. He is remembered as a pioneer of forward play in batting and for a shot named after him, called "Pilch's poke".

== Early life ==
Pilch was born in Horningtoft, Norfolk, England as the third son of a cobbler named Nathaniel Pilch and his wife Frances (née Fuller). They had been married at Brisley and returned to live there when Pilch was young.

Pilch worked as a tailor before he followed in the footsteps of his two elder brothers, Nathaniel and William, and became a professional cricketer.

== Cricket career ==
Pilch's first appearance at Lord's was a three-day match in July 1820, playing for Norfolk. He then went to Sheffield to play cricket and earn his living as a tailor.

By the late 1820s, he was seen as the finest batsman in England and acquired the nickname, "the non pareil [unrivalled] hitter".

He appeared 23 times in Gentlemen v Players matches.

In 1833, in highly publicised single wicket matches, Pilch twice defeated Tom Marsden, another prominent batsman of the time.

Demand for his services as a cricketer led him to move to Town Malling, Kent in 1835 and receive a salary of 100 pounds a year. There he kept a tavern named the Cricketers’ Inn, attached to the cricket ground.

Pilch moved to Canterbury in 1842 where he kept the Saracen's Head. He served as the first groundsman of the St Lawrence Ground from 1847 to 1868.

== Style and technique ==
Pilch was described as "the greatest batsman ever known until the appearance of W. G. Grace". An early pioneer of batting, Pilch's method of playing the ball forward is seen as an early manifestation of modern batting practices. The main characteristic of his batting was his forward play, using a shot that was called "Pilch's poke".

Writing in 1862 in his Scores and Biographies, Arthur Haygarth called Pilch "the best batsman that has ever yet appeared". Haygarth further wrote: "His style of batting was very commanding, extremely forward, and he seemed to rush to the best bowling by his long forward play before it had time to shoot or rise, or do mischief by catches".

Though his statistics may seem fairly ordinary as reflected by modern standards, the ten centuries he amassed throughout his entire club and playing career were hailed as "remarkable" in the context of the roundarm bowling and poorly maintained cricket pitches he encountered during his career.

As to the question of how Pilch would compare with the greatest of his successors, editor Sydney Pardon wrote in W. G. Grace's obituary in the 1916 edition of Wisden Cricketers' Almanack:

A story is told of a cricketer who had regarded Fuller Pilch as the final word in batting, being taken in his old age to see Mr. Grace bat for the first time. He watched the great man for a quarter of an hour or so and then broke out into an expression of boundless delight. 'Why', he said, 'this man scores continuously from balls that old Fuller would have been thankful to stop'.

Pilch died at Canterbury in 1870. He never married.

== Legacy ==
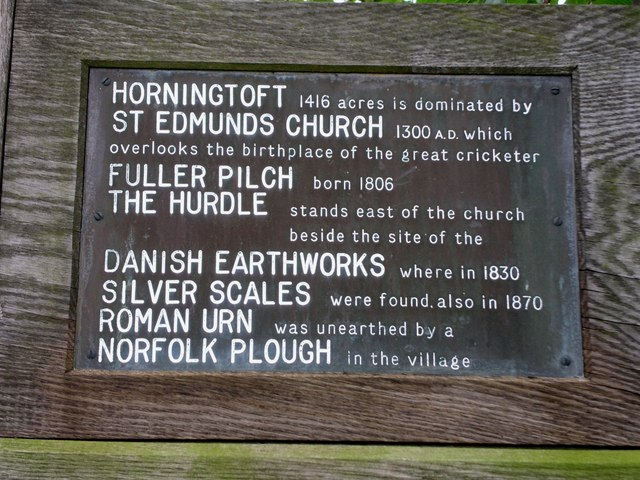
Pilch is remembered on the village sign at Horningtoft

Along with his two brothers, Pilch's nephew William Pilch also played cricket.

In June 2008, it was reported in The Times that Pilch's grave in St Gregory's churchyard in Canterbury was preventing the development of the churchyard into a Canterbury Christ Church University concert hall, as it could not be located for removal. Soon afterwards, the grave was located through the use of an old photograph and the memories of local people.

In the novel Flashman's Lady by George MacDonald Fraser, Pilch is caught and bowled by Harry Flashman in a fictional game at Lord's between Rugby Old Boys and Kent in 1842.

Pilch is mentioned in the song "Gentlemen and Players" on the 2009 cricket concept album The Duckworth Lewis Method, created by Irish duo Thomas Walsh and Neil Hannon.
