= List of civil parishes in Norfolk =

A map of parishes in Norfolk (2010)

This is a list of civil parishes in the ceremonial county of Norfolk, England. There are 540 civil parishes.

Population figures are unavailable for some of the smallest parishes.

King's Lynn, Great Yarmouth and Norwich are unparished.

| Civil parish | Civil parish population 2011 | Area (km^{2}) 2011 | District | Pre 1974 District |
|---|---|---|---|---|
| Acle | 2,824 | 9.38 | Broadland | Blofield and Flegg Rural District |
| Alburgh | 410 | 6.42 | South Norfolk | Depwade Rural District |
| Alby with Thwaite | 245 | 5.81 | North Norfolk | Erpingham Rural District |
| Aldborough and Thurgarton | 578 | 7.15 | North Norfolk | Erpingham Rural District |
| Aldeby | 422 | 12.50 | South Norfolk | Loddon Rural District |
| Alderford | | | Broadland | St Faiths and Aylsham Rural District |
| Alpington | 477 | 2.18 | South Norfolk | Loddon Rural District |
| Anmer | | | King's Lynn and West Norfolk | Docking Rural District |
| Antingham | 355 | 6.12 | North Norfolk | Erpingham Rural District |
| Ashby St Mary | 316 | 2.03 | South Norfolk | Loddon Rural District |
| Ashby with Oby | | | Great Yarmouth | Blofield and Flegg Rural District |
| Ashill | 1,411 | 12.26 | Breckland | Swaffham Rural District |
| Ashmanhaugh | 189 | 4.82 | North Norfolk | Smallburgh Rural District |
| Ashwellthorpe and Fundenhall | 750 | 9.74 | South Norfolk | Depwade Rural District |
| Aslacton | 434 | 4.88 | South Norfolk | Depwade Rural District |
| Attleborough (town) | 10,482 | 21.90 | Breckland | Wayland Rural District |
| Attlebridge | 223 | 9.36 | Broadland | St Faiths and Aylsham Rural District |
| Aylmerton | 458 | 6.86 | North Norfolk | Erpingham Rural District |
| Aylsham (town) | 6,016 | 17.52 | Broadland | St Faiths and Aylsham Rural District |
| Baconsthorpe | 215 | 5.53 | North Norfolk | Erpingham Rural District |
| Bacton | 1,194 | 9.17 | North Norfolk | Smallburgh Rural District |
| Bagthorpe with Barmer | | | King's Lynn and West Norfolk | Docking Rural District |
| Banham | 1,481 | 16.17 | Breckland | Wayland Rural District |
| Barford | 547 | 4.38 | South Norfolk | Forehoe and Henstead Rural District |
| Barnham Broom | 590 | 7.24 | South Norfolk | Forehoe and Henstead Rural District |
| Barsham | 232 | 19.40 | North Norfolk | Walsingham Rural District |
| Barton Bendish | 210 | 15.92 | King's Lynn and West Norfolk | Downham Rural District |
| Barton Turf | 467 | 10.84 | North Norfolk | Smallburgh Rural District |
| Barwick | | | King's Lynn and West Norfolk | Docking Rural District |
| Bawburgh | 595 | 5.82 | South Norfolk | Forehoe and Henstead Rural District |
| Bawdeswell | 828 | 4.87 | Breckland | Mitford and Launditch Rural District |
| Bawsey | 216 | 6.80 | King's Lynn and West Norfolk | Freebridge Lynn Rural District |
| Beachamwell | 339 | 22.15 | Breckland | Swaffham Rural District |
| Bedingham | 221 | 5.52 | South Norfolk | Loddon Rural District |
| Beeston Regis | 1,062 | 2.78 | North Norfolk | Erpingham Rural District |
| Beeston St. Andrew | | | Broadland | St Faiths and Aylsham Rural District |
| Beeston with Bittering | 566 | 10.80 | Breckland | Mitford and Launditch Rural District |
| Beetley | 1,396 | 11.02 | Breckland | Mitford and Launditch Rural District |
| Beighton | 436 | 7.63 | Broadland | Blofield and Flegg Rural District |
| Belaugh | 134 | 7.45 | Broadland | St Faiths and Aylsham Rural District |
| Belton with Browston | 3,805 | 8.31 | Great Yarmouth | Lothingland Rural District |
| Bergh Apton | 442 | 8.05 | South Norfolk | Loddon Rural District |
| Besthorpe | 778 | 8.87 | Breckland | Wayland Rural District |
| Billingford | 253 | 7.36 | Breckland | Mitford and Launditch Rural District |
| Binham | 292 | 11.52 | North Norfolk | Walsingham Rural District |
| Bintree | 329 | 5.99 | Breckland | Mitford and Launditch Rural District |
| Bircham | 448 | 24.82 | King's Lynn and West Norfolk | Docking Rural District |
| Blakeney | 801 | 12.38 | North Norfolk | Walsingham Rural District |
| Blickling | 113 | 8.62 | Broadland | St Faiths and Aylsham Rural District |
| Blo' Norton | 251 | 4.62 | Breckland | Wayland Rural District |
| Blofield | 3,316 | 9.41 | Broadland | Blofield and Flegg Rural District |
| Bodham | 484 | 6.80 | North Norfolk | Erpingham Rural District |
| Booton | 196 | 11.52 | Broadland | St Faiths and Aylsham Rural District |
| Boughton | 227 | 5.48 | King's Lynn and West Norfolk | Downham Rural District |
| Bracon Ash | 460 | 9.84 | South Norfolk | Forehoe and Henstead Rural District |
| Bradenham | 700 | 16.55 | Breckland | Swaffham Rural District |
| Bradwell | 10,528 | 9.47 | Great Yarmouth | Lothingland Rural District |
| Bramerton | 301 | 2.06 | South Norfolk | Forehoe and Henstead Rural District |
| Brampton | 191 | 4.78 | Broadland | St Faiths and Aylsham Rural District |
| Brancaster | 797 | 18.19 | King's Lynn and West Norfolk | Docking Rural District |
| Brandiston | | | Broadland | St Faiths and Aylsham Rural District |
| Brandon Parva, Coston, Runhall and Welborne | 401 | 11.98 | South Norfolk | Forehoe and Henstead Rural District |
| Bressingham | 887 | 15.77 | South Norfolk | Depwade Rural District |
| Brettenham | 555 | 33.83 | Breckland | Wayland Rural District |
| Bridgham | 335 | 11.06 | Breckland | Wayland Rural District |
| Briningham | 130 | 4.96 | North Norfolk | Walsingham Rural District |
| Brinton | 222 | 6.13 | North Norfolk | Walsingham Rural District |
| Brisley | 281 | 4.90 | Breckland | Mitford and Launditch Rural District |
| Briston | 2,439 | 11.96 | North Norfolk | Walsingham Rural District |
| Brockdish | 681 | 9.15 | South Norfolk | Depwade Rural District |
| Brooke | 1,399 | 11.92 | South Norfolk | Loddon Rural District |
| Broome | 458 | 5.91 | South Norfolk | Loddon Rural District |
| Brumstead | | | North Norfolk | Smallburgh Rural District |
| Brundall | 4,019 | 4.39 | Broadland | Blofield and Flegg Rural District |
| Bunwell | 1,024 | 10.11 | South Norfolk | Depwade Rural District |
| Burgh and Tuttington | 322 | 6.70 | Broadland | St Faiths and Aylsham Rural District |
| Burgh Castle | 1,150 | 6.03 | Great Yarmouth | Lothingland Rural District |
| Burgh St. Peter | 274 | 8.41 | South Norfolk | Loddon Rural District |
| Burnham Market | 877 | 18.43 | King's Lynn and West Norfolk | Docking Rural District |
| Burnham Norton | 173 | 14.81 | King's Lynn and West Norfolk | Docking Rural District |
| Burnham Overy | 134 | 2.89 | King's Lynn and West Norfolk | Docking Rural District |
| Burnham Thorpe | 144 | 9.56 | King's Lynn and West Norfolk | Docking Rural District |
| Burston and Shimpling | 568 | 9.17 | South Norfolk | Depwade Rural District |
| Buxton with Lamas | 1,684 | 8.74 | Broadland | St Faiths and Aylsham Rural District |
| Bylaugh | | | Breckland | Mitford and Launditch Rural District |
| Caister-on-Sea | 8,901 | 3.92 | Great Yarmouth | Blofield and Flegg Rural District |
| Caistor St Edmund and Bixley | 433 | 11.97 | South Norfolk | Forehoe and Henstead Rural District |
| Cantley, Limpenhoe and Southwood | 733 | 12.90 | Broadland | Blofield and Flegg Rural District |
| Carbrooke | 2,073 | 12.66 | Breckland | Wayland Rural District |
| Carleton Rode | 785 | 10.91 | South Norfolk | Depwade Rural District |
| Carleton St. Peter | | | South Norfolk | Loddon Rural District |
| Castle Acre | | | King's Lynn and West Norfolk | Freebridge Lynn Rural District |
| Castle Rising | 216 | 8.65 | King's Lynn and West Norfolk | Freebridge Lynn Rural District |
| Caston | 443 | 6.37 | Breckland | Wayland Rural District |
| Catfield | 943 | 9.69 | North Norfolk | Smallburgh Rural District |
| Cawston | 1,640 | 17.03 | Broadland | St Faiths and Aylsham Rural District |
| Chedgrave | 1,051 | 3.52 | South Norfolk | Loddon Rural District |
| Choseley | | | King's Lynn and West Norfolk | Docking Rural District |
| Claxton | 291 | 7.26 | South Norfolk | Loddon Rural District |
| Clenchwarton | 2,171 | 12.59 | King's Lynn and West Norfolk | Marshland Rural District |
| Cley next the Sea | 437 | 8.19 | North Norfolk | Erpingham Rural District |
| Cockley Cley | 232 | 25.52 | Breckland | Swaffham Rural District |
| Colby | 494 | 8.34 | North Norfolk | Erpingham Rural District |
| Colkirk | 588 | 10.60 | Breckland | Mitford and Launditch Rural District |
| Colney | 153 | 3.77 | South Norfolk | Forehoe and Henstead Rural District |
| Coltishall | 1,503 | 7.27 | Broadland | St Faiths and Aylsham Rural District |
| Congham | 241 | 11.70 | King's Lynn and West Norfolk | Freebridge Lynn Rural District |
| Corpusty and Saxthorpe | 697 | 12.73 | North Norfolk | Erpingham Rural District |
| Costessey (town) | 12,463 | 12.39 | South Norfolk | Forehoe and Henstead Rural District |
| Cranwich | | | Breckland | Swaffham Rural District |
| Cranworth | 419 | 20.63 | Breckland | Mitford and Launditch Rural District |
| Crimplesham | 298 | 12.08 | King's Lynn and West Norfolk | Downham Rural District |
| Cringleford | 2,963 | 4.11 | South Norfolk | Forehoe and Henstead Rural District |
| Cromer (town) | 7,683 | 4.35 | North Norfolk | Cromer Urban District |
| Crostwick | | | Broadland | St Faiths and Aylsham Rural District |
| Croxton | 445 | 18.96 | Breckland | Wayland Rural District |
| Denton | 326 | 10.11 | South Norfolk | Depwade Rural District |
| Denver | 890 | 10.61 | King's Lynn and West Norfolk | Downham Rural District |
| Deopham | 541 | 9.79 | South Norfolk | Forehoe and Henstead Rural District |
| Dereham (town) | 18,609 | 21.51 | Breckland | East Dereham Urban District |
| Dersingham | 4,640 | 14.50 | King's Lynn and West Norfolk | Docking Rural District |
| Dickleburgh and Rushall | 1,472 | 14.31 | South Norfolk | Depwade Rural District |
| Didlington | | | Breckland | Swaffham Rural District |
| Dilham | 319 | 6.55 | North Norfolk | Smallburgh Rural District |
| Diss (town) | 7,572 | 5.32 | South Norfolk | Diss Urban District |
| Ditchingham | 1,635 | 8.56 | South Norfolk | Loddon Rural District |
| Docking | 1,200 | 25.79 | King's Lynn and West Norfolk | Docking Rural District |
| Downham Market (town) | 9,994 | 5.20 | King's Lynn and West Norfolk | Downham Market Urban District |
| Downham West | 286 | 8.44 | King's Lynn and West Norfolk | Downham Rural District |
| Drayton | 5,489 | 5.56 | Broadland | St Faiths and Aylsham Rural District |
| Dunton | 126 | 15.55 | North Norfolk | Walsingham Rural District |
| Earsham | 882 | 12.65 | South Norfolk | Depwade Rural District |
| East Beckham | | | North Norfolk | Erpingham Rural District |
| East Carleton | 343 | 4.96 | South Norfolk | Forehoe and Henstead Rural District |
| Harling | 2,142 | 6.90 | Breckland | Wayland Rural District |
| East Rudham | 541 | 17.94 | King's Lynn and West Norfolk | Docking Rural District |
| East Ruston | 595 | 13.35 | North Norfolk | Smallburgh Rural District |
| East Tuddenham | 517 | 8.47 | Breckland | Mitford and Launditch Rural District |
| East Walton | | | King's Lynn and West Norfolk | Freebridge Lynn Rural District |
| East Winch | 779 | 19.95 | King's Lynn and West Norfolk | Freebridge Lynn Rural District |
| Easton | 1,514 | 6.25 | South Norfolk | Forehoe and Henstead Rural District |
| Edgefield | 385 | 10.07 | North Norfolk | Erpingham Rural District |
| Ellingham | | | South Norfolk | Loddon Rural District |
| Elsing | 244 | 6.34 | Breckland | Mitford and Launditch Rural District |
| Emneth | 2,617 | 11.77 | King's Lynn and West Norfolk | Marshland Rural District |
| Erpingham | 700 | 12.21 | North Norfolk | Erpingham Rural District |
| Fakenham (town) | 7,617 | 9.04 | North Norfolk | Walsingham Rural District |
| Felbrigg | 193 | 6.30 | North Norfolk | Erpingham Rural District |
| Felmingham | 561 | 7.68 | North Norfolk | Smallburgh Rural District |
| Felthorpe | 745 | 8.70 | Broadland | St Faiths and Aylsham Rural District |
| Feltwell | 2,825 | 52.16 | King's Lynn and West Norfolk | Downham Rural District |
| Field Dalling | 285 | 12.87 | North Norfolk | Walsingham Rural District |
| Filby | 765 | 5.80 | Great Yarmouth | Blofield and Flegg Rural District |
| Fincham | 496 | 12.03 | King's Lynn and West Norfolk | Downham Rural District |
| Fleggburgh | 948 | 11.98 | Great Yarmouth | Blofield and Flegg Rural District |
| Flitcham with Appleton | 276 | 22.94 | King's Lynn and West Norfolk | Freebridge Lynn Rural District |
| Flordon | 281 | 3.74 | South Norfolk | Forehoe and Henstead Rural District |
| Fordham | | | King's Lynn and West Norfolk | Downham Rural District |
| Forncett | 1,126 | 10.76 | South Norfolk | Depwade Rural District |
| Foulden | 430 | 12.95 | Breckland | Swaffham Rural District |
| Foulsham | 1,021 | 12.56 | Broadland | St Faiths and Aylsham Rural District |
| Foxley | 285 | 6.66 | Breckland | Mitford and Launditch Rural District |
| Framingham Earl | 871 | 2.56 | South Norfolk | Forehoe and Henstead Rural District |
| Framingham Pigot | 153 | 2.57 | South Norfolk | Forehoe and Henstead Rural District |
| Fransham | 433 | 12.14 | Breckland | Mitford and Launditch Rural District |
| Freethorpe | 995 | 9.51 | Broadland | Blofield and Flegg Rural District |
| Frettenham | 740 | 6.33 | Broadland | St Faiths and Aylsham Rural District |
| Fring | | | King's Lynn and West Norfolk | Docking Rural District |
| Fritton and St. Olaves | 524 | 7.51 | Great Yarmouth | Lothingland Rural District |
| Fulmodeston | 442 | 15.04 | North Norfolk | Walsingham Rural District |
| Garboldisham | 969 | 35.72 | Breckland | Wayland Rural District |
| Garvestone, Reymerston and Thuxton | 660 | 14.52 | Breckland | Mitford and Launditch Rural District |
| Gateley | | | Breckland | Mitford and Launditch Rural District |
| Gayton | 1,432 | 22.84 | King's Lynn and West Norfolk | Freebridge Lynn Rural District |
| Geldeston | 397 | 3.40 | South Norfolk | Loddon Rural District |
| Gillingham | 676 | 8.21 | South Norfolk | Loddon Rural District |
| Gimingham | 513 | 6.00 | North Norfolk | Erpingham Rural District |
| Gissing | 252 | 8.11 | South Norfolk | Depwade Rural District |
| Gooderstone | 363 | 11.29 | Breckland | Swaffham Rural District |
| Great and Little Plumstead | 3,135 | 11.04 | Broadland | Blofield and Flegg Rural District |
| Great Cressingham | 421 | 21.74 | Breckland | Swaffham Rural District |
| Great Dunham | 344 | 11.48 | Breckland | Mitford and Launditch Rural District |
| Great Ellingham | 1,132 | 11.14 | Breckland | Wayland Rural District |
| Hockham | 603 | 13.36 | Breckland | Wayland Rural District |
| Great Massingham | 902 | 17.17 | King's Lynn and West Norfolk | Freebridge Lynn Rural District |
| Great Melton | 163 | 10.24 | South Norfolk | Forehoe and Henstead Rural District |
| Great Moulton | 751 | 5.66 | South Norfolk | Depwade Rural District |
| Great Snoring | 143 | 6.85 | North Norfolk | Walsingham Rural District |
| Great Witchingham | 496 | 1.97 | Broadland | St Faiths and Aylsham Rural District |
| Gresham | 401 | 8.69 | North Norfolk | Erpingham Rural District |
| Gressenhall | 1,050 | 10.53 | Breckland | Mitford and Launditch Rural District |
| Grimston | 1,980 | 18.08 | King's Lynn and West Norfolk | Freebridge Lynn Rural District |
| Griston | 1,540 | 5.62 | Breckland | Wayland Rural District |
| Guestwick | 207 | 10.14 | Broadland | St Faiths and Aylsham Rural District |
| Guist | 250 | 8.93 | Breckland | Mitford and Launditch Rural District |
| Gunthorpe | 244 | 8.82 | North Norfolk | Walsingham Rural District |
| Haddiscoe | 487 | 19.90 | South Norfolk | Loddon Rural District |
| Hainford | 989 | 6.94 | Broadland | St Faiths and Aylsham Rural District |
| Hales | 469 | 3.99 | South Norfolk | Loddon Rural District |
| Halvergate | 607 | 24.59 | Broadland | Blofield and Flegg Rural District |
| Hanworth | 169 | 8.74 | North Norfolk | Erpingham Rural District |
| Happisburgh | 889 | 9.63 | North Norfolk | Smallburgh Rural District |
| Hardingham | 267 | 9.78 | Breckland | Mitford and Launditch Rural District |
| Harpley | 338 | 9.29 | King's Lynn and West Norfolk | Freebridge Lynn Rural District |
| Haveringland | 283 | 12.05 | Broadland | St Faiths and Aylsham Rural District |
| Heacham | 4,750 | 13.76 | King's Lynn and West Norfolk | Docking Rural District |
| Heckingham | 179 | 4.46 | South Norfolk | Loddon Rural District |
| Hedenham | 240 | 10.06 | South Norfolk | Loddon Rural District |
| Helhoughton | 346 | 6.83 | North Norfolk | Walsingham Rural District |
| Hellesdon | 10,957 | 5.24 | Broadland | St Faiths and Aylsham Rural District |
| Hellington | | | South Norfolk | Loddon Rural District |
| Hemblington | 332 | 3.03 | Broadland | Blofield and Flegg Rural District |
| Hempnall | 1,292 | 14.82 | South Norfolk | Depwade Rural District |
| Hempstead | 177 | 7.19 | North Norfolk | Erpingham Rural District |
| Hempton | 505 | 2.15 | North Norfolk | Walsingham Rural District |
| Hemsby | 3,275 | 7.04 | Great Yarmouth | Blofield and Flegg Rural District |
| Hethersett | 5,691 | 10.92 | South Norfolk | Forehoe and Henstead Rural District |
| Hevingham | 1,260 | 11.66 | Broadland | St Faiths and Aylsham Rural District |
| Heydon | 222 | 16.22 | Broadland | St Faiths and Aylsham Rural District |
| Heywood | 222 | 9.56 | South Norfolk | Diss Urban District |
| Hickling | 935 | 16.20 | North Norfolk | Smallburgh Rural District |
| High Kelling | 536 | 1.46 | North Norfolk | Erpingham Rural District |
| Hilborough | 243 | 58.63 | Breckland | Swaffham Rural District |
| Hilgay | 1,341 | 33.35 | King's Lynn and West Norfolk | Downham Rural District |
| Hillington | 400 | 19.54 | King's Lynn and West Norfolk | Freebridge Lynn Rural District |
| Hindolveston | 598 | 16.75 | North Norfolk | Walsingham Rural District |
| Hindringham | 457 | 13.72 | North Norfolk | Walsingham Rural District |
| Hingham | | | South Norfolk | Forehoe and Henstead Rural District |
| Hockering | 711 | 8.10 | Breckland | Mitford and Launditch Rural District |
| Hockwold cum Wilton | 1,195 | 31.05 | King's Lynn and West Norfolk | Downham Rural District |
| Hoe and Worthing | 241 | 9.25 | Breckland | Mitford and Launditch Rural District |
| Holkham | 220 | 22.20 | North Norfolk | Walsingham Rural District |
| Holme Hale | 494 | 10.69 | Breckland | Swaffham Rural District |
| Holme next the Sea | 239 | 7.21 | King's Lynn and West Norfolk | Docking Rural District |
| Holt (town) | 3,810 | 12.19 | North Norfolk | Erpingham Rural District |
| Holverston | 155 | 4.48 | South Norfolk | Forehoe and Henstead Rural District |
| Honing | 312 | 8.80 | North Norfolk | Smallburgh Rural District |
| Honingham | 358 | 10.55 | Broadland | St Faiths and Aylsham Rural District |
| Hopton on Sea | 2,988 | 5.57 | Great Yarmouth | Lothingland Rural District |
| Horning | 1,098 | 10.72 | North Norfolk | Smallburgh Rural District |
| Horningtoft | 127 | 5.73 | Breckland | Mitford and Launditch Rural District |
| Horsey | | | North Norfolk | Smallburgh Rural District |
| Horsford | 4,163 | 16.56 | Broadland | St Faiths and Aylsham Rural District |
| Horsham St. Faith and Newton St. Faith | 1,724 | 7.33 | Broadland | St Faiths and Aylsham Rural District |
| Horstead with Stanninghall | 1,184 | 14.37 | Broadland | St Faiths and Aylsham Rural District |
| Houghton | | | King's Lynn and West Norfolk | Docking Rural District |
| Hoveton | 1,759 | 10.09 | North Norfolk | Smallburgh Rural District |
| Howe | | | South Norfolk | Loddon Rural District |
| Hunstanton (town) | 4,229 | 2.26 | King's Lynn and West Norfolk | Hunstanton Urban District |
| Ickburgh | 309 | 30.67 | Breckland | Swaffham Rural District |
| Ingham | | | North Norfolk | Smallburgh Rural District |
| Ingoldisthorpe | 849 | 11.26 | King's Lynn and West Norfolk | Docking Rural District |
| Ingworth | | | North Norfolk | Erpingham Rural District |
| Itteringham | 125 | 8.20 | North Norfolk | Erpingham Rural District |
| Kelling | 177 | 8.00 | North Norfolk | Erpingham Rural District |
| Kempstone | | | Breckland | Mitford and Launditch Rural District |
| Kenninghall | 941 | 14.85 | Breckland | Wayland Rural District |
| Keswick and Intwood | 444 | 5.52 | South Norfolk | Forehoe and Henstead Rural District |
| Ketteringham | 178 | 6.50 | South Norfolk | Forehoe and Henstead Rural District |
| Kettlestone | 197 | 7.55 | North Norfolk | Walsingham Rural District |
| Kilverstone | | | Breckland | Wayland Rural District |
| Kimberley and Carleton Forehoe | 154 | 9.33 | South Norfolk | Forehoe and Henstead Rural District |
| Kirby Bedon | 198 | 7.82 | South Norfolk | Forehoe and Henstead Rural District |
| Kirby Cane | 434 | 9.78 | South Norfolk | Loddon Rural District |
| Kirstead | 279 | 4.19 | South Norfolk | Loddon Rural District |
| Knapton | 364 | 5.80 | North Norfolk | Smallburgh Rural District |
| Langham | 372 | 7.07 | North Norfolk | Walsingham Rural District |
| Langley with Hardley | 488 | 15.09 | South Norfolk | Loddon Rural District |
| Lessingham | 566 | 7.48 | North Norfolk | Smallburgh Rural District |
| Letheringsett with Glandford | 232 | 8.19 | North Norfolk | Erpingham Rural District |
| Lexham | 146 | 9.73 | Breckland | Mitford and Launditch Rural District |
| Leziate | 592 | 11.37 | King's Lynn and West Norfolk | Freebridge Lynn Rural District |
| Lingwood and Burlingham | 2,643 | 9.39 | Broadland | Blofield and Flegg Rural District |
| Litcham | 618 | 7.89 | Breckland | Mitford and Launditch Rural District |
| Little Barningham | 111 | 5.05 | North Norfolk | Erpingham Rural District |
| Little Cressingham | 374 | 6.13 | Breckland | Swaffham Rural District |
| Little Dunham | 297 | 7.49 | Breckland | Mitford and Launditch Rural District |
| Little Ellingham | 250 | 6.24 | Breckland | Wayland Rural District |
| Little Massingham | | | King's Lynn and West Norfolk | Freebridge Lynn Rural District |
| Little Melton | 897 | 2.75 | South Norfolk | Forehoe and Henstead Rural District |
| Little Snoring | 619 | 7.31 | North Norfolk | Walsingham Rural District |
| Little Witchingham | 2,367 | 14.98 | Broadland | St Faiths and Aylsham Rural District |
| Loddon (town) | 2,648 | 13.71 | South Norfolk | Loddon Rural District |
| Long Stratton (town) | 4,424 | 10.49 | South Norfolk | Depwade Rural District |
| Longham | 224 | 5.40 | Breckland | Mitford and Launditch Rural District |
| Ludham | 1,276 | 12.05 | North Norfolk | Smallburgh Rural District |
| Lynford | 179 | 24.72 | Breckland | Swaffham Rural District |
| Lyng | 807 | 7.99 | Breckland | Mitford and Launditch Rural District |
| Marham | 3,531 | 14.85 | King's Lynn and West Norfolk | Downham Rural District |
| Marlingford and Colton | 378 | 6.62 | South Norfolk | Forehoe and Henstead Rural District |
| Marsham | 734 | 7.40 | Broadland | St Faiths and Aylsham Rural District |
| Marshland St. James | 1,209 | 25.69 | King's Lynn and West Norfolk | Marshland Rural District |
| Martham | 3,569 | 11.80 | Great Yarmouth | Blofield and Flegg Rural District |
| Matlask | 139 | 5.45 | North Norfolk | Erpingham Rural District |
| Mattishall | 2,617 | 11.89 | Breckland | Mitford and Launditch Rural District |
| Mautby | 383 | 16.43 | Great Yarmouth | Blofield and Flegg Rural District |
| Melton Constable | 618 | 6.96 | North Norfolk | Walsingham Rural District |
| Merton | 133 | 5.94 | Breckland | Wayland Rural District |
| Methwold | 1,502 | 49.12 | King's Lynn and West Norfolk | Downham Rural District |
| Middleton | 1,450 | 13.01 | King's Lynn and West Norfolk | Freebridge Lynn Rural District |
| Mileham | 563 | 11.66 | Breckland | Mitford and Launditch Rural District |
| Morley | 1,241 | 8.21 | South Norfolk | Forehoe and Henstead Rural District |
| Morningthorpe and Fritton | 267 | 7.74 | South Norfolk | Depwade Rural District |
| Morston | | | North Norfolk | Walsingham Rural District |
| Morton on the Hill | | | Broadland | St Faiths and Aylsham Rural District |
| Mulbarton | 3,521 | 5.34 | South Norfolk | Forehoe and Henstead Rural District |
| Mundesley | 2,758 | 2.59 | North Norfolk | Erpingham Rural District |
| Mundford | 1,526 | 8.32 | Breckland | Swaffham Rural District |
| Mundham | 177 | 6.31 | South Norfolk | Loddon Rural District |
| Narborough | 1,094 | 14.05 | Breckland | Swaffham Rural District |
| Narford | | | Breckland | Swaffham Rural District |
| Neatishead | 565 | 7.71 | North Norfolk | Smallburgh Rural District |
| Necton | 1,923 | 15.48 | Breckland | Swaffham Rural District |
| Needham | 309 | 4.69 | South Norfolk | Depwade Rural District |
| New Buckenham | 460 | 1.73 | Breckland | Wayland Rural District |
| Newton by Castle Acre | 848 | 13.18 | Breckland | Swaffham Rural District |
| Newton Flotman | 1,489 | 4.87 | South Norfolk | Forehoe and Henstead Rural District |
| Nordelph | 405 | 16.57 | King's Lynn and West Norfolk | Downham Rural District |
| North Creake | 386 | 14.99 | King's Lynn and West Norfolk | Docking Rural District |
| North Elmham | 1,433 | 25.33 | Breckland | Mitford and Launditch Rural District |
| North Lopham | 623 | 8.17 | Breckland | Wayland Rural District |
| North Pickenham | 472 | 10.15 | Breckland | Swaffham Rural District |
| North Runcton | 549 | 5.99 | King's Lynn and West Norfolk | Freebridge Lynn Rural District |
| North Tuddenham | 335 | 9.41 | Breckland | Mitford and Launditch Rural District |
| North Walsham (town) | 12,634 | 17.27 | North Norfolk | North Walsham Urban District |
| North Wootton | 2,445 | 20.06 | King's Lynn and West Norfolk | Freebridge Lynn Rural District |
| Northrepps | 886 | 10.65 | North Norfolk | Erpingham Rural District |
| Northwold | 1,085 | 19.72 | King's Lynn and West Norfolk | Downham Rural District |
| Norton Subcourse | 298 | 9.05 | South Norfolk | Loddon Rural District |
| Old Buckenham | 1,270 | 20.06 | Breckland | Wayland Rural District |
| Old Catton | 6,108 | 2.33 | Broadland | St Faiths and Aylsham Rural District |
| Old Hunstanton | 628 | 7.39 | King's Lynn and West Norfolk | Docking Rural District |
| Ormesby St. Margaret with Scratby | 3,974 | 7.24 | Great Yarmouth | Blofield and Flegg Rural District |
| Ormesby St. Michael | 302 | 4.21 | Great Yarmouth | Blofield and Flegg Rural District |
| Oulton | 193 | 10.58 | Broadland | St Faiths and Aylsham Rural District |
| Outwell | 2,083 | 12.21 | King's Lynn and West Norfolk | Marshland Rural District |
| Overstrand | 1,030 | 1.57 | North Norfolk | Erpingham Rural District |
| Ovington | 256 | 6.44 | Breckland | Wayland Rural District |
| Oxborough | 228 | 13.24 | Breckland | Swaffham Rural District |
| Paston | 239 | 5.54 | North Norfolk | Smallburgh Rural District |
| Pentney | 544 | 10.39 | King's Lynn and West Norfolk | Freebridge Lynn Rural District |
| Plumstead | 128 | 5.17 | North Norfolk | Erpingham Rural District |
| Poringland | 3,802 | 6.32 | South Norfolk | Forehoe and Henstead Rural District |
| Postwick with Witton | 404 | 8.29 | Broadland | Blofield and Flegg Rural District |
| Potter Heigham | 1,043 | 9.94 | North Norfolk | Smallburgh Rural District |
| Pudding Norton | 252 | 5.95 | North Norfolk | Walsingham Rural District |
| Pulham Market | 977 | 12.08 | South Norfolk | Depwade Rural District |
| Pulham St. Mary | 892 | 12.26 | South Norfolk | Depwade Rural District |
| Quidenham | 560 | 22.51 | Breckland | Wayland Rural District |
| Rackheath | 1,972 | 7.52 | Broadland | St Faiths and Aylsham Rural District |
| Raveningham | 162 | 8.05 | South Norfolk | Loddon Rural District |
| Raynham | 330 | 16.75 | North Norfolk | Walsingham Rural District |
| Redenhall with Harleston (town) | 4,641 | 13.73 | South Norfolk | Depwade Rural District |
| Reedham | 1,207 | 12.19 | Broadland | Blofield and Flegg Rural District |
| Reepham (town) | 2,709 | 19.09 | Broadland | St Faiths and Aylsham Rural District |
| Repps with Bastwick | 391 | 5.06 | Great Yarmouth | Blofield and Flegg Rural District |
| Riddlesworth | | | Breckland | Wayland Rural District |
| Ringland | 250 | 5.05 | Broadland | St Faiths and Aylsham Rural District |
| Ringstead | 324 | 11.13 | King's Lynn and West Norfolk | Docking Rural District |
| Rockland St. Mary | 810 | 5.50 | South Norfolk | Forehoe and Henstead Rural District |
| Rocklands | 722 | 10.97 | Breckland | Wayland Rural District |
| Rollesby | 946 | 5.91 | Great Yarmouth | Blofield and Flegg Rural District |
| Roudham and Larling | 301 | 15.20 | Breckland | Wayland Rural District |
| Rougham | 141 | 10.85 | Breckland | Mitford and Launditch Rural District |
| Roughton | 934 | 7.23 | North Norfolk | Erpingham Rural District |
| Roydon | 357 | 4.62 | King's Lynn and West Norfolk | Freebridge Lynn Rural District |
| Roydon | 2,450 | 5.22 | South Norfolk | Depwade Rural District |
| Runcton Holme | 657 | 13.81 | King's Lynn and West Norfolk | Downham Rural District |
| Runton | 1,667 | 5.06 | North Norfolk | Erpingham Rural District |
| Ryburgh | 694 | 10.04 | North Norfolk | Walsingham Rural District |
| Ryston | 178 | 18.30 | King's Lynn and West Norfolk | Downham Rural District |
| Saham Toney | 1,507 | 16.51 | Breckland | Swaffham Rural District |
| Salhouse | 1,486 | 8.92 | Broadland | St Faiths and Aylsham Rural District |
| Salle | | | Broadland | St Faiths and Aylsham Rural District |
| Salthouse | 201 | 6.02 | North Norfolk | Erpingham Rural District |
| Sandringham | 437 | 26.48 | King's Lynn and West Norfolk | Freebridge Lynn Rural District |
| Saxlingham Nethergate | 688 | 8.55 | South Norfolk | Forehoe and Henstead Rural District |
| Scarning | 2,906 | 14.13 | Breckland | Mitford and Launditch Rural District |
| Scole | 1,367 | 14.90 | South Norfolk | Depwade Rural District |
| Scottow | 1,424 | 8.59 | North Norfolk | Smallburgh Rural District |
| Scoulton | 246 | 9.02 | Breckland | Wayland Rural District |
| Sculthorpe | 751 | 8.52 | North Norfolk | Walsingham Rural District |
| Sea Palling | 655 | 19.07 | North Norfolk | Smallburgh Rural District |
| Sedgeford | 613 | 23.99 | King's Lynn and West Norfolk | Docking Rural District |
| Seething | 365 | 6.78 | South Norfolk | Loddon Rural District |
| Shelfanger | 378 | 6.99 | South Norfolk | Depwade Rural District |
| Shelton and Hardwick | 298 | 8.90 | South Norfolk | Depwade Rural District |
| Sheringham (town) | 7,367 | 3.72 | North Norfolk | Sheringham Urban District |
| Shernborne | | | King's Lynn and West Norfolk | Docking Rural District |
| Shipdham | 2,057 | 18.69 | Breckland | Mitford and Launditch Rural District |
| Shotesham | 562 | 14.50 | South Norfolk | Forehoe and Henstead Rural District |
| Shouldham Thorpe | 165 | 5.87 | King's Lynn and West Norfolk | Downham Rural District |
| Shouldham | 605 | 16.04 | King's Lynn and West Norfolk | Downham Rural District |
| Shropham | 405 | 11.12 | Breckland | Wayland Rural District |
| Sidestrand | | | North Norfolk | Erpingham Rural District |
| Sisland | | | South Norfolk | Loddon Rural District |
| Skeyton | 207 | 5.28 | North Norfolk | Smallburgh Rural District |
| Sloley | 257 | 3.04 | North Norfolk | Smallburgh Rural District |
| Smallburgh | 509 | 5.02 | North Norfolk | Smallburgh Rural District |
| Snetterton | 201 | 8.94 | Breckland | Wayland Rural District |
| Snettisham | 2,570 | 23.36 | King's Lynn and West Norfolk | Docking Rural District |
| Somerton | 289 | 8.26 | Great Yarmouth | Blofield and Flegg Rural District |
| South Acre | 115 | 24.22 | Breckland | Swaffham Rural District |
| South Creake | 516 | 20.18 | King's Lynn and West Norfolk | Docking Rural District |
| South Lopham | 393 | 7.91 | Breckland | Wayland Rural District |
| South Pickenham | | | Breckland | Swaffham Rural District |
| South Walsham | 845 | 11.38 | Broadland | Blofield and Flegg Rural District |
| South Wootton | 4,247 | 8.50 | King's Lynn and West Norfolk | Freebridge Lynn Rural District |
| Southery | 1,324 | 18.12 | King's Lynn and West Norfolk | Downham Rural District |
| Southrepps | 815 | 8.45 | North Norfolk | Erpingham Rural District |
| Sparham | 341 | 13.66 | Breckland | Mitford and Launditch Rural District |
| Spixworth | 3,718 | 7.36 | Broadland | St Faiths and Aylsham Rural District |
| Spooner Row | | | South Norfolk | Wymondham Urban District |
| Sporle with Palgrave | 1,011 | 17.21 | Breckland | Swaffham Rural District |
| Sprowston (town) | 14,691 | 9.46 | Broadland | St Faiths and Aylsham Rural District |
| Stalham (town) | 3,149 | 7.30 | North Norfolk | Smallburgh Rural District |
| Stanfield | 162 | 3.80 | Breckland | Mitford and Launditch Rural District |
| Stanford | | | Breckland | Swaffham Rural District |
| Stanhoe | 289 | 20.38 | King's Lynn and West Norfolk | Docking Rural District |
| Starston | 331 | 9.02 | South Norfolk | Depwade Rural District |
| Stibbard | 346 | 6.68 | North Norfolk | Walsingham Rural District |
| Stiffkey | 209 | 8.76 | North Norfolk | Walsingham Rural District |
| Stockton | | | South Norfolk | Loddon Rural District |
| Stody | 185 | 7.99 | North Norfolk | Erpingham Rural District |
| Stoke Ferry | 1,020 | 9.15 | King's Lynn and West Norfolk | Downham Rural District |
| Stoke Holy Cross | 1,572 | 9.27 | South Norfolk | Forehoe and Henstead Rural District |
| Stokesby with Herringby | 330 | 8.50 | Great Yarmouth | Blofield and Flegg Rural District |
| Stow Bardolph | 1,230 | 24.57 | King's Lynn and West Norfolk | Downham Rural District |
| Stow Bedon and Breckles | 290 | 13.68 | Breckland | Wayland Rural District |
| Stradsett | | | King's Lynn and West Norfolk | Downham Rural District |
| Stratton Strawless | 580 | 7.14 | Broadland | St Faiths and Aylsham Rural District |
| Strumpshaw | 634 | 11.69 | Broadland | Blofield and Flegg Rural District |
| Sturston | | | Breckland | Swaffham Rural District |
| Suffield | 129 | 5.94 | North Norfolk | Erpingham Rural District |
| Surlingham | 725 | 7.32 | South Norfolk | Forehoe and Henstead Rural District |
| Sustead | 215 | 6.84 | North Norfolk | Erpingham Rural District |
| Sutton | 1,163 | 6.34 | North Norfolk | Smallburgh Rural District |
| Swaffham (town) | 7,258 | 29.57 | Breckland | Swaffham Urban District |
| Swafield | 315 | 6.43 | North Norfolk | Smallburgh Rural District |
| Swainsthorpe | 360 | 3.38 | South Norfolk | Forehoe and Henstead Rural District |
| Swannington | 366 | 10.70 | Broadland | St Faiths and Aylsham Rural District |
| Swanton Abbott | 565 | 9.63 | North Norfolk | Smallburgh Rural District |
| Swanton Morley | 2,100 | 11.14 | Breckland | Mitford and Launditch Rural District |
| Swanton Novers | 239 | 5.45 | North Norfolk | Walsingham Rural District |
| Swardeston | 619 | 3.95 | South Norfolk | Forehoe and Henstead Rural District |
| Syderstone | 445 | 9.94 | King's Lynn and West Norfolk | Docking Rural District |
| Tacolneston | 825 | 6.45 | South Norfolk | Depwade Rural District |
| Tasburgh | 1,149 | 3.71 | South Norfolk | Depwade Rural District |
| Tattersett | 962 | 11.38 | North Norfolk | Walsingham Rural District |
| Taverham | 10,142 | 8.70 | Broadland | St Faiths and Aylsham Rural District |
| Terrington St Clement | 4,125 | 47.20 | King's Lynn and West Norfolk | Marshland Rural District |
| Terrington St. John | 891 | 8.26 | King's Lynn and West Norfolk | Marshland Rural District |
| Tharston and Hapton | 793 | 9.26 | South Norfolk | Depwade Rural District |
| Themelthorpe | | | Broadland | St Faiths and Aylsham Rural District |
| Thetford (town) | 24,340 | 29.55 | Breckland | Thetford Municipal Borough |
| Thompson | 343 | 9.20 | Breckland | Wayland Rural District |
| Thornage | 192 | 5.12 | North Norfolk | Erpingham Rural District |
| Thornham | 496 | 19.55 | King's Lynn and West Norfolk | Docking Rural District |
| Thorpe Market | 289 | 5.89 | North Norfolk | Erpingham Rural District |
| Thorpe St Andrew (town) | 14,556 | 7.08 | Broadland | Blofield and Flegg Rural District |
| Thurlton | 779 | 5.20 | South Norfolk | Loddon Rural District |
| Thurne | 212 | 8.27 | Great Yarmouth | Blofield and Flegg Rural District |
| Thurning | | | North Norfolk | Walsingham Rural District |
| Thursford | 205 | 6.02 | North Norfolk | Walsingham Rural District |
| Thurton | 567 | 3.18 | South Norfolk | Loddon Rural District |
| Thwaite | | | South Norfolk | Loddon Rural District |
| Tibenham | 494 | 13.34 | South Norfolk | Depwade Rural District |
| Tilney All Saints | 573 | 11.42 | King's Lynn and West Norfolk | Marshland Rural District |
| Tilney St. Lawrence | 1,576 | 20.48 | King's Lynn and West Norfolk | Marshland Rural District |
| Titchwell | | | King's Lynn and West Norfolk | Docking Rural District |
| Tittleshall | 406 | 13.82 | Breckland | Mitford and Launditch Rural District |
| Tivetshall | 591 | 11.55 | South Norfolk | Depwade Rural District |
| Toft Monks | 348 | 6.87 | South Norfolk | Loddon Rural District |
| Topcroft | 265 | 7.76 | South Norfolk | Loddon Rural District |
| Tottenhill | 219 | 5.90 | King's Lynn and West Norfolk | Downham Rural District |
| Tottington | | | Breckland | Wayland Rural District |
| Trimingham | 485 | 3.63 | North Norfolk | Erpingham Rural District |
| Trowse with Newton | 862 | 4.49 | South Norfolk | Forehoe and Henstead Rural District |
| Trunch | 909 | 5.49 | North Norfolk | Smallburgh Rural District |
| Tunstead | 744 | 11.32 | North Norfolk | Smallburgh Rural District |
| Twyford | | | Breckland | Mitford and Launditch Rural District |
| Upper Sheringham | 209 | 6.12 | North Norfolk | Erpingham Rural District |
| Upton with Fishley | 702 | 8.81 | Broadland | Blofield and Flegg Rural District |
| Upwell | 2,750 | 27.65 | King's Lynn and West Norfolk | Marshland Rural District |
| Wacton | 302 | 4.54 | South Norfolk | Depwade Rural District |
| Walcott | 548 | 0.72 | North Norfolk | Smallburgh Rural District |
| Walpole Cross Keys | 518 | 4.03 | King's Lynn and West Norfolk | Marshland Rural District |
| Walpole Highway | 701 | 10.48 | King's Lynn and West Norfolk | Marshland Rural District |
| Walpole | 1,804 | 19.22 | King's Lynn and West Norfolk | Marshland Rural District |
| Walsingham | 819 | 18.98 | North Norfolk | Walsingham Rural District |
| Walsoken | 1,485 | 12.54 | King's Lynn and West Norfolk | Marshland Rural District |
| Warham | 193 | 13.21 | North Norfolk | Walsingham Rural District |
| Watlington | 2,455 | 6.84 | King's Lynn and West Norfolk | Downham Rural District |
| Watton (town) | 7,202 | 7.20 | Breckland | Wayland Rural District |
| Weasenham All Saints | 223 | 12.55 | Breckland | Mitford and Launditch Rural District |
| Weasenham St. Peter | 169 | 5.79 | Breckland | Mitford and Launditch Rural District |
| Weeting-with-Broomhill | 1,839 | 25.16 | Breckland | Swaffham Rural District |
| Wellingham | 554 | 5.61 | Breckland | Mitford and Launditch Rural District |
| Wells-next-the-Sea (town) | 2,165 | 10.83 | North Norfolk | Wells next the Sea Urban District |
| Welney | 542 | 20.56 | King's Lynn and West Norfolk | Downham Rural District |
| Wendling | 313 | 5.25 | Breckland | Mitford and Launditch Rural District |
| Wereham | 660 | 8.59 | King's Lynn and West Norfolk | Downham Rural District |
| West Acre | 260 | 25.31 | King's Lynn and West Norfolk | Freebridge Lynn Rural District |
| West Beckham | 289 | 6.14 | North Norfolk | Erpingham Rural District |
| West Caister | 175 | 6.81 | Great Yarmouth | Blofield and Flegg Rural District |
| West Dereham | 450 | 13.51 | King's Lynn and West Norfolk | Downham Rural District |
| West Rudham | 288 | 19.44 | King's Lynn and West Norfolk | Docking Rural District |
| West Walton | 1,731 | 15.64 | King's Lynn and West Norfolk | Marshland Rural District |
| West Winch | 2,735 | 8.02 | King's Lynn and West Norfolk | Freebridge Lynn Rural District |
| Weston Longville | 339 | 11.24 | Broadland | St Faiths and Aylsham Rural District |
| Westwick | | | North Norfolk | Smallburgh Rural District |
| Weybourne | 543 | 6.80 | North Norfolk | Erpingham Rural District |
| Wheatacre | 118 | 4.38 | South Norfolk | Loddon Rural District |
| Whinburgh and Westfield | 342 | 7.56 | Breckland | Mitford and Launditch Rural District |
| Whissonsett | 488 | 5.57 | Breckland | Mitford and Launditch Rural District |
| Wicklewood | 922 | 8.75 | South Norfolk | Forehoe and Henstead Rural District |
| Wickmere | 158 | 7.07 | North Norfolk | Erpingham Rural District |
| Wiggenhall St. Germans | 1,373 | 18.42 | King's Lynn and West Norfolk | Downham Rural District |
| Wiggenhall St. Mary Magdalen | 729 | 17.55 | King's Lynn and West Norfolk | Downham Rural District |
| Wighton | 222 | 11.93 | North Norfolk | Walsingham Rural District |
| Wimbotsham | 664 | 5.96 | King's Lynn and West Norfolk | Downham Rural District |
| Winfarthing | 503 | 10.80 | South Norfolk | Depwade Rural District |
| Winterton-on-Sea | 1,278 | 5.38 | Great Yarmouth | Blofield and Flegg Rural District |
| Witton | 318 | 9.77 | North Norfolk | Smallburgh Rural District |
| Wiveton | 127 | 4.25 | North Norfolk | Walsingham Rural District |
| Wood Dalling | 209 | 9.89 | Broadland | St Faiths and Aylsham Rural District |
| Wood Norton | 217 | 6.99 | North Norfolk | Walsingham Rural District |
| Woodbastwick | 399 | 18.83 | Broadland | Blofield and Flegg Rural District |
| Woodton | 482 | 8.85 | South Norfolk | Loddon Rural District |
| Wormegay | 359 | 12.18 | King's Lynn and West Norfolk | Downham Rural District |
| Worstead | 922 | 10.65 | North Norfolk | Smallburgh Rural District |
| Wortwell | 561 | 4.60 | South Norfolk | Depwade Rural District |
| Wramplingham | 115 | 3.47 | South Norfolk | Forehoe and Henstead Rural District |
| Wreningham | 528 | 6.24 | South Norfolk | Forehoe and Henstead Rural District |
| Wretham | 374 | 32.25 | Breckland | Wayland Rural District |
| Wretton | 369 | 4.70 | King's Lynn and West Norfolk | Downham Rural District |
| Wroxham | 1,502 | 2.30 | Broadland | St Faiths and Aylsham Rural District |
| Wymondham (town) | 14,405 | 44.31 | South Norfolk | Wymondham Urban District |
| Yaxham | 772 | 6.64 | Breckland | Mitford and Launditch Rural District |
| Yelverton | 173 | 2.21 | South Norfolk | Loddon Rural District |

== See also ==
- Catch-land
- List of civil parishes in England
- List of places in Norfolk
