= History of parliamentary constituencies and boundaries in Norfolk =

The ceremonial county of Norfolk returned nine MPs to the UK Parliament. Under the 2023 review of Westminster constituencies, coming into effect for the 2024 general election, the boundary commission proposed 10 constituencies, including one which is shared with the county of Suffolk.

== Number of seats ==
The table below shows the number of MPs representing Norfolk at each major redistribution of seats affecting the county.

Year	County seats^{1}	Borough seats^{1}	Total
Prior to 1832	2	10	12
1832–1868	4	8	12
1868–1885	6	4	10
1885–1918	6	4	10
1918–1950	5	3	8
1950–1974	6	2	8
1974–1983	5	2	7
1983–2010	6	2	8
2010–2024	7	2	9
2024–present	8	2	10^{2}

^{1}Prior to 1950, seats were classified as County Divisions or Parliamentary Boroughs. Since 1950, they have been classified as County or Borough Constituencies.

^{2}Includes one cross-county border constituency shared with Suffolk.

== Timeline ==
County seat Borough seat

Constituency	Prior to 1832	1832–1868	1868–1885	1885–1918	1918–1950	1950–1974	1974–1983	1983–2010	2010–2024	2024–present
Norfolk	1290–1832 (2 MPs)									
Norwich	1295–1950 (2 MPs)									
Norwich North						1950–present				
Norwich South						1950–present				
Broadland									2010–2024	
Broadland and Fakenham										2024–present
North Norfolk			1868–1885 (2 MPs)	1885–present						
East Norfolk		1832–1868 (2 MPs)		1885–1950						
Great Yarmouth	1295–1868 (2 MPs)			1885–1950		1950–present				
South Norfolk			1868–1885 (2 MPs)	1885–present						
Waveney Valley (part)										2024–present
Mid Norfolk				1885–1918				1983–present		
Central Norfolk						1950–1974				
Thetford	1529–1868 (2 MPs)									
West Norfolk		1832–1885 (2 MPs)								
South West Norfolk				1885–present						
North West Norfolk				1885–1918			1974–present			
King's Lynn	1295–1885 (2 MPs)			1885–1918	1918–1974					
Castle Rising	1558–1832 (2 MPs)									

== Boundary reviews ==
Prior to 1832	Since 1290, the Parliamentary County of Norfolk along with all other English counties regardless of size or population, had elected two MPs (Knights of the Shire) to the House of Commons. The county also included five Parliamentary Boroughs, namely Castle Rising, Great Yarmouth (partly in Suffolk), King's Lynn, Norwich and Thetford, all returning two MPs (burgesses) each.	
1832	The Reform Act 1832 radically changed the representation of the House of Commons, with the county being divided into the Eastern and Western Divisions, both returning two MPs. The Borough of Castle Rising was abolished.	
1868	Under the Representation of the People Act 1867, the county was further divided. The Eastern Division was abolished and redistributed to the North and South Divisions, which both also included small areas transferred from the Western Division. Thetford's representation was reduced to one MP and Great Yarmouth was disenfranchised for corruption. Thetford was then also disenfranchised under the Representation of the People (Scotland) Act 1868, which had resulted in a net increase of seven seats in Scotland, offset by the disenfranchisement of seven English Boroughs.	
1885	Under the Redistribution of Seats Act 1885, the three two-member county divisions were replaced by six single-member constituencies, namely the Eastern, Mid, Northern, North-Western, Southern and South-Western Divisions. Great Yarmouth was re-established as a single-member Borough and the representation of the Borough of King's Lynn was reduced to one MP. Norwich continued to elect two MPs.	Norfolk 1885–1918
1918	Under the Representation of the People Act 1918, the Parliamentary Borough of King's Lynn was abolished and reconstituted as a county division, absorbing the abolished North-Western Division, with the exception of Fakenham and surrounding areas, which were transferred to the Northern Division. The Mid Division was also abolished, with northern areas, including East Dereham, being transferred to the South-Western Division, and southern areas to the Southern Division. The Eastern Division was expanded southwards, gaining the Rural District of Loddon and Clavering from the Southern Division. Other minor changes to align boundaries with those of local authorities.	Norfolk 1918–1950
1950	The Representation of the People Act 1948 resulted in the abolition of the Eastern Division, with its contents being distributed as follows: northern areas, including North Walsham and the Rural District of Smallburgh to North Norfolk; southern areas (Rural District of Loddon) returned to South Norfolk; eastern areas (the bulk of the Rural District of Blofield and Flegg) included in the new county constituency of Yarmouth, together with the abolished Parliamentary Borough of Great Yarmouth; and; western areas (former Rural District of St Faith's, and the village of Thorpe St Andrew) included in the new county constituency of Central Norfolk.; Central Norfolk also included areas to the north (former Rural District of Aylsham) and south (Rural District of Forehoe and Henstead), transferred from the Northern and Southern divisions respectively. The two-member Borough of Norwich was also abolished, and divided into the single-member borough constituencies of Norwich North and Norwich South. The Municipal Borough of Thetford was transferred from South West Norfolk to South Norfolk. Other minor changes to align boundaries with those of local authorities. There were no changes for the 1955 general election under the First Periodic Review of Westminster Constituencies.	Norfolk 1950–1974
1974	Under the Second Periodic Review, representation was decreased back down to seven MPs with the abolition of Central Norfolk. Northern and central areas (Rural District of St Faith's and Aylsham) were transferred to North Norfolk; southern areas returned to South Norfolk (Rural District of Forehoe and Henstead); and Thorpe St Andrew transferred to Yarmouth. King's Lynn was replaced by North West Norfolk, which also incorporated Wells-next-the-Sea and the Rural District of Walsingham, including Fakenham, transferred from North Norfolk.	Norfolk 1974–1983
1983	The Third Review, which reflected the changes to local authorities arising from the Local Government Act 1972, but did not come into effect until the 1983 general election. Norfolk's representation was restored to eight MPs with the re-establishment of Mid Norfolk which was made up as follows: eastern areas transferred from Yarmouth; central areas (including Aylsham) transferred from North Norfolk; and; western areas (including East Dereham) transferred from South West Norfolk.; Yarmouth was formally renamed Great Yarmouth and incorporated the small area, including Bradwell, which had been transferred from Suffolk to Norfolk under the local government reorganisation and was previously part of the constituency of Lowestoft. Other changes included: Thetford and areas comprising the former Rural District of Wayland, including Attleborough, transferred from South Norfolk to South West Norfolk; Wells-next-the-Sea and areas comprising the former Rural District of Walsingham, including Fakenham, transferred back from North West Norfolk to North Norfolk; Norwich North gained suburban areas now part of the District of Broadland, including Thorpe St Andrew from Yarmouth and Hellesdon and Sprowston from North Norfolk; Southern parts of Norwich North transferred to Norwich South.	Norfolk 1983–1997
1997	The Fourth Review resulted in only minor changes to increase the electorates of the two Norwich constituencies. The District of Broadland wards of Drayton and Taverham were transferred from Mid Norfolk to Norwich North and the District of South Norfolk wards of Cringleford and Colney, and New Costessey were transferred from South Norfolk to Norwich South.	Norfolk 1997–2010
2010	In the Fifth Review the Boundary Commission for England recommended that Norfolk's representation be increased to nine MPs, with the creation of the constituency of Broadland, based on the District of Broadland wards which had previously comprised a majority of Mid Norfolk, as well as Drayton and Taverham, transferred back from Norwich North. It also included Fakenham and surrounding areas, transferred once again from North Norfolk. Mid Norfolk now comprised the District of Breckland wards in the previous version of the constituency with additional wards, including Watton and Attleborough, transferred from South West Norfolk. Six District of South Norfolk wards, including Wymondham, were transferred from the constituency of South Norfolk. Cringleford and Colney (but not New Costessey) were transferred back from Norwich South to South Norfolk and a small area in the south-west of North West Norfolk was transferred to South West Norfolk.	Norfolk 2010–2024
2024	For the 2023 Periodic Review of Westminster constituencies, which redrew the constituency map ahead of the 2024 United Kingdom general election, the Boundary Commission for England opted to combine Norfolk with Suffolk as a sub-region of the East of England region, with the creation of the cross-county boundary constituency of Waveney Valley, which incorporated areas transferred from South Norfolk to the north of the River Waveney, including the towns of Diss and Harleston. To compensate South Norfolk, Wymondham was transferred back in from Mid Norfolk. Apart from changes to align with new ward boundaries, the only other adjustment was to move Drayton (but not Taverham) back from Broadland (renamed Broadland and Fakenham) to Norwich North once again.	Norfolk 2024–present

== See also ==
- List of parliamentary constituencies in Norfolk
