= Swaffham Rural District =

Former local government area in the UK

Coordinates: 52.57°N 0.69°E

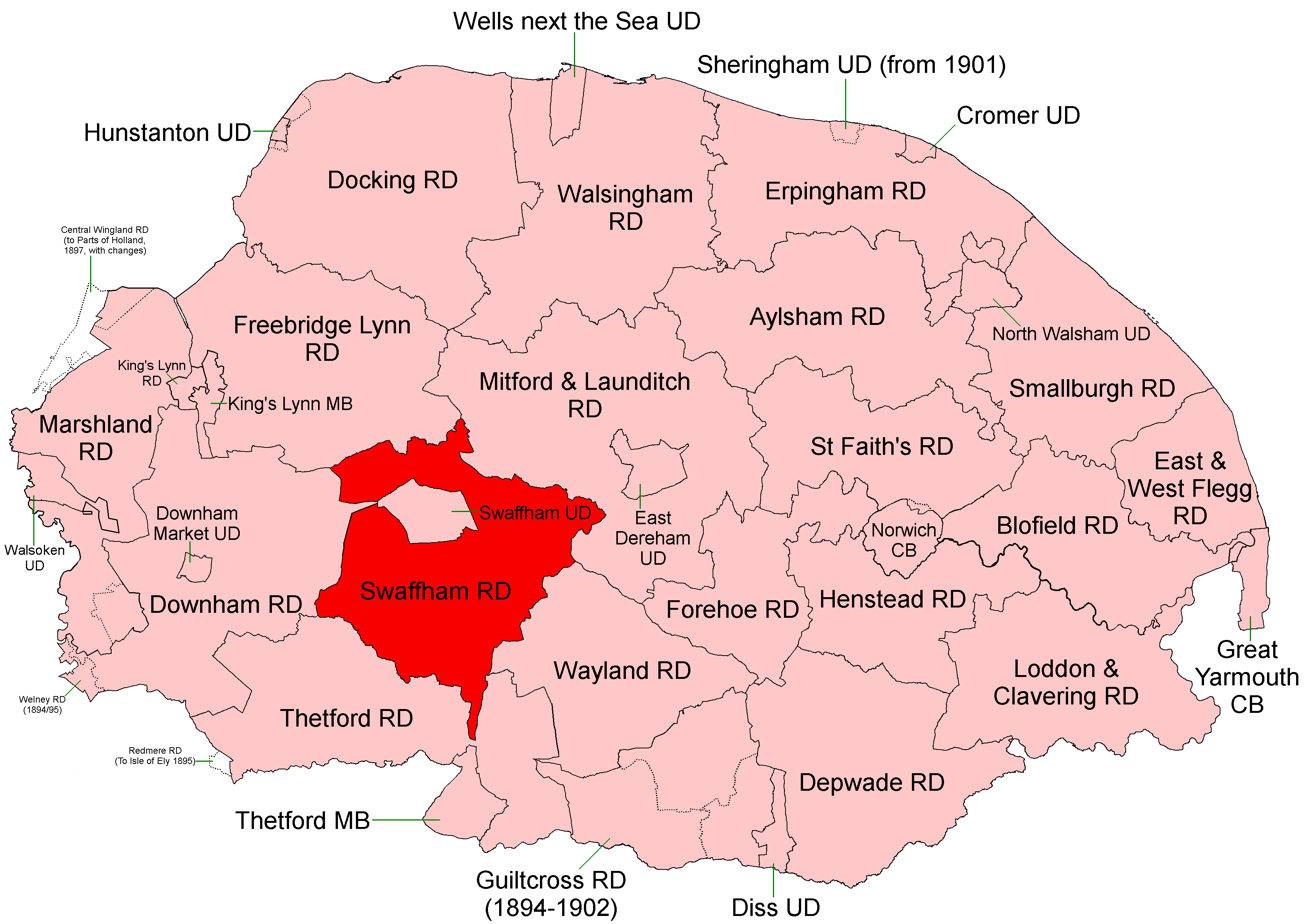
Boundaries in 1894

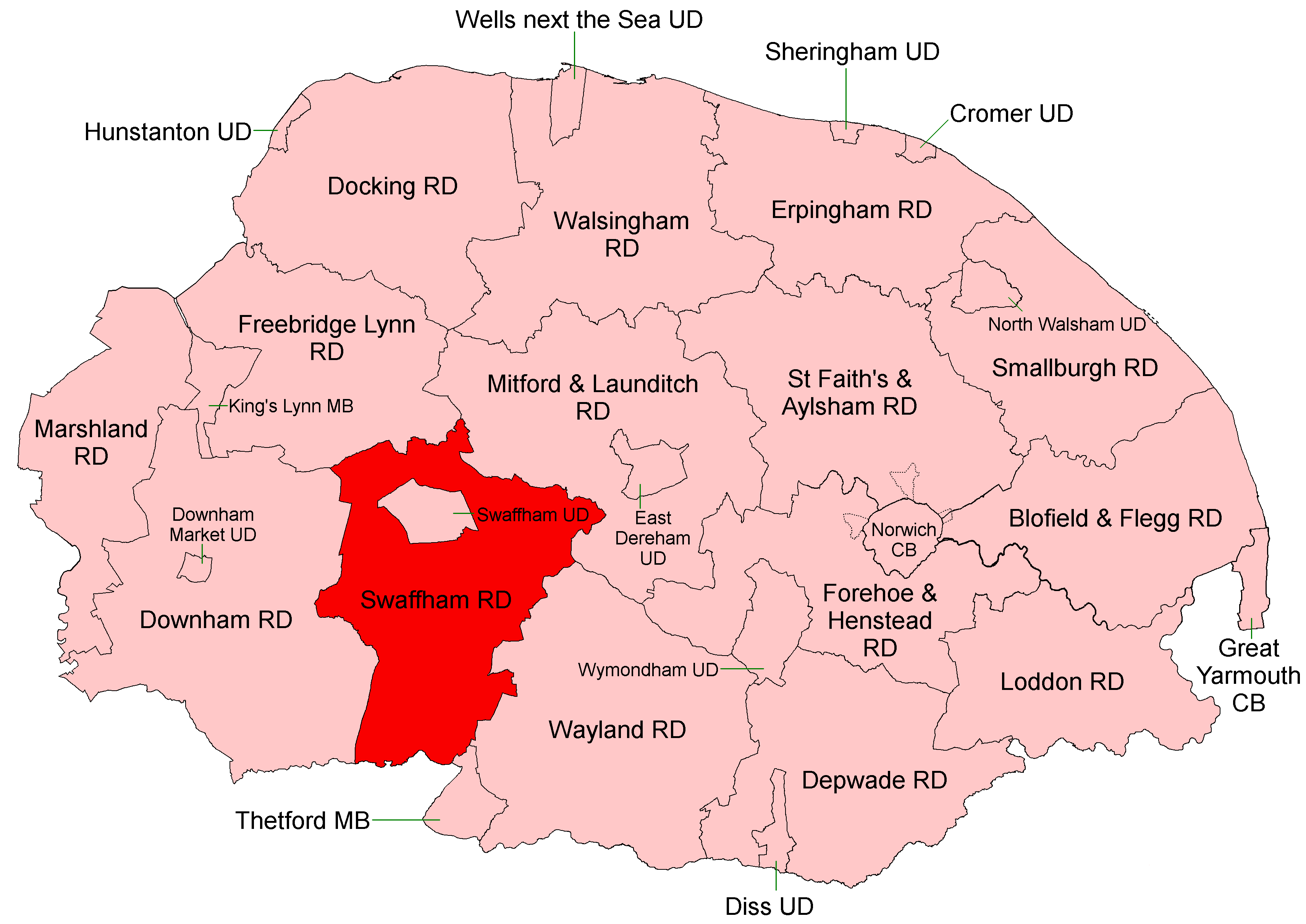
Boundaries in 1935

Swaffham Rural District was a rural district in Norfolk, England from 1894 to 1974.

It was formed under the Local Government Act 1894 based on the Swaffham rural sanitary district. It almost completely encircled Swaffham Urban District.

In 1935 it took in a small part of Downham Rural District to complete the encirclement of urban Swaffham. It also took in the central section of the disbanded Thetford Rural District.

In 1974, the district was abolished under the Local Government Act 1972, and became part of the Breckland district.

== Statistics ==
Year	Area (ha)	Population	Density (pop/ha)
1911	30,172	7,571	0.25
1921	30,172	7,237	0.24
1931	30,172	6,769	0.22
1951	37,724	10,606	0.28
1961	37,724	9,164	0.24

== Parishes ==
Parish	From	To	Notes
Ashill			
Beachamwell	1935		Merger of Beechamwell and Shingham
Beechamwell		1935	
Bodney		1935	Added to Hilborough
Bradenham	1952		Merger of East Bradenham and West Bradenham
Buckenham Tofts		1935	Added to Stanford
Caldecote		1935	Added to Oxborough
Cockley Cley			
Colveston		1935	Added to Didlington
Cranwich	1935		Formerly Thetford RD
Didlington			
East Bradenham		1952	Component of Bradenham
Foulden			
Gooderstone			
Great Cressingham			
Hilborough			
Holme Hale			
Houghton on the Hill		1935	Added to North Pickenham
Ickburgh			
Langford		1935	Added to Ickburgh
Little Cressingham			
Lynford	1935		Formerly Thetford RD (including Santon and West Tofts)
Mundford	1935		Formerly Thetford RD
Narborough			
Narford			
Necton			
Newton by Castle Acre			
North Pickenham			
Oxborough			
Saham Toney			
Shingham		1935	Component of Beachamwell
South Acre			
South Pickenham			
Sporle with Palgrave			
Stanford			
Sturston	1935		Formerly Thetford RD
Threxton		1935	Added to Little Cressingham
Weeting with Broomhill	1935		Formerly Thetford RD
West Bradenham		1952	Component of Bradenham
