= Marshland Rural District =

Former local government area in the UK

Coordinates: 52.65°N 0.24°E

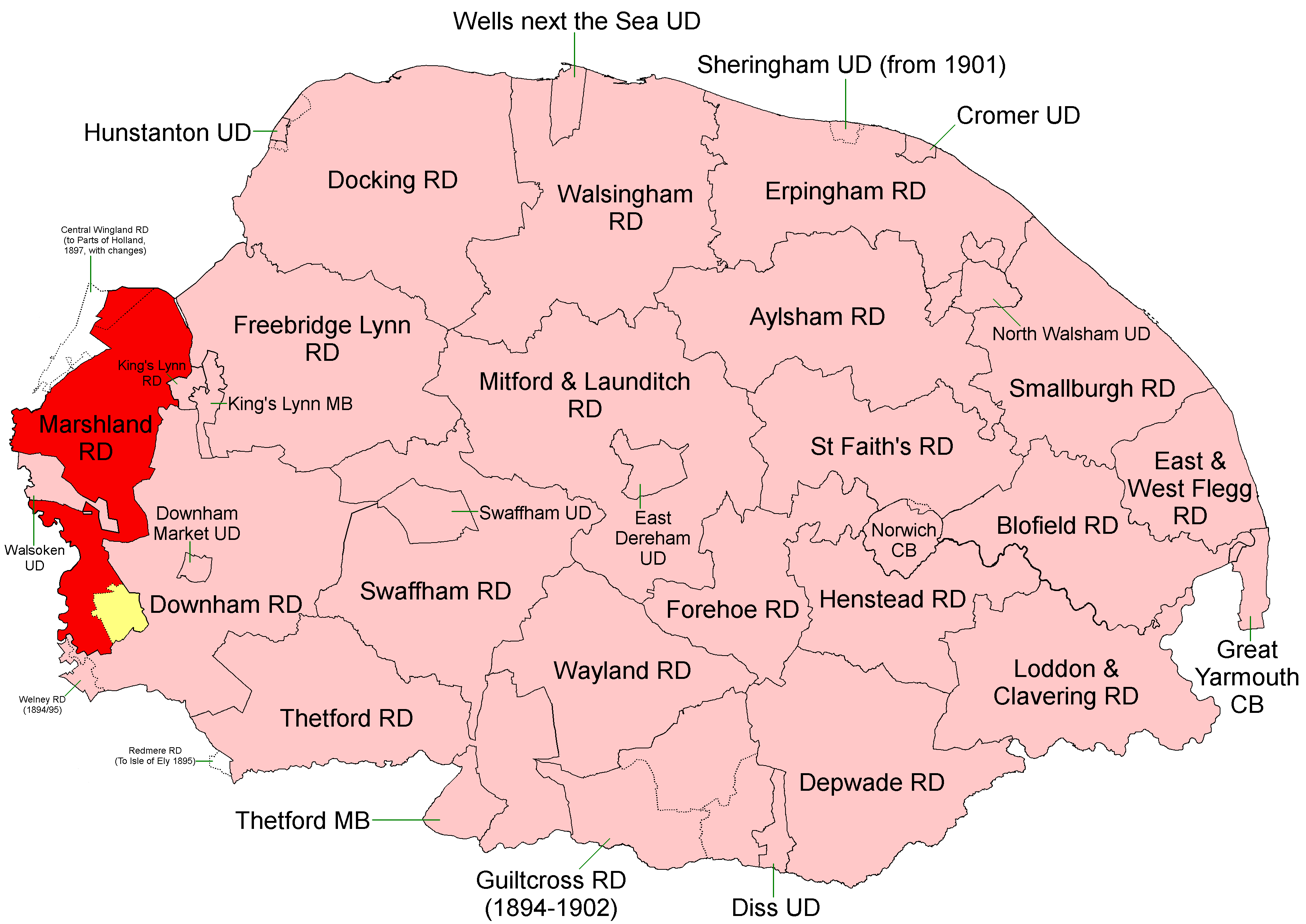
Boundaries in 1894. 1930 reduction in yellow.

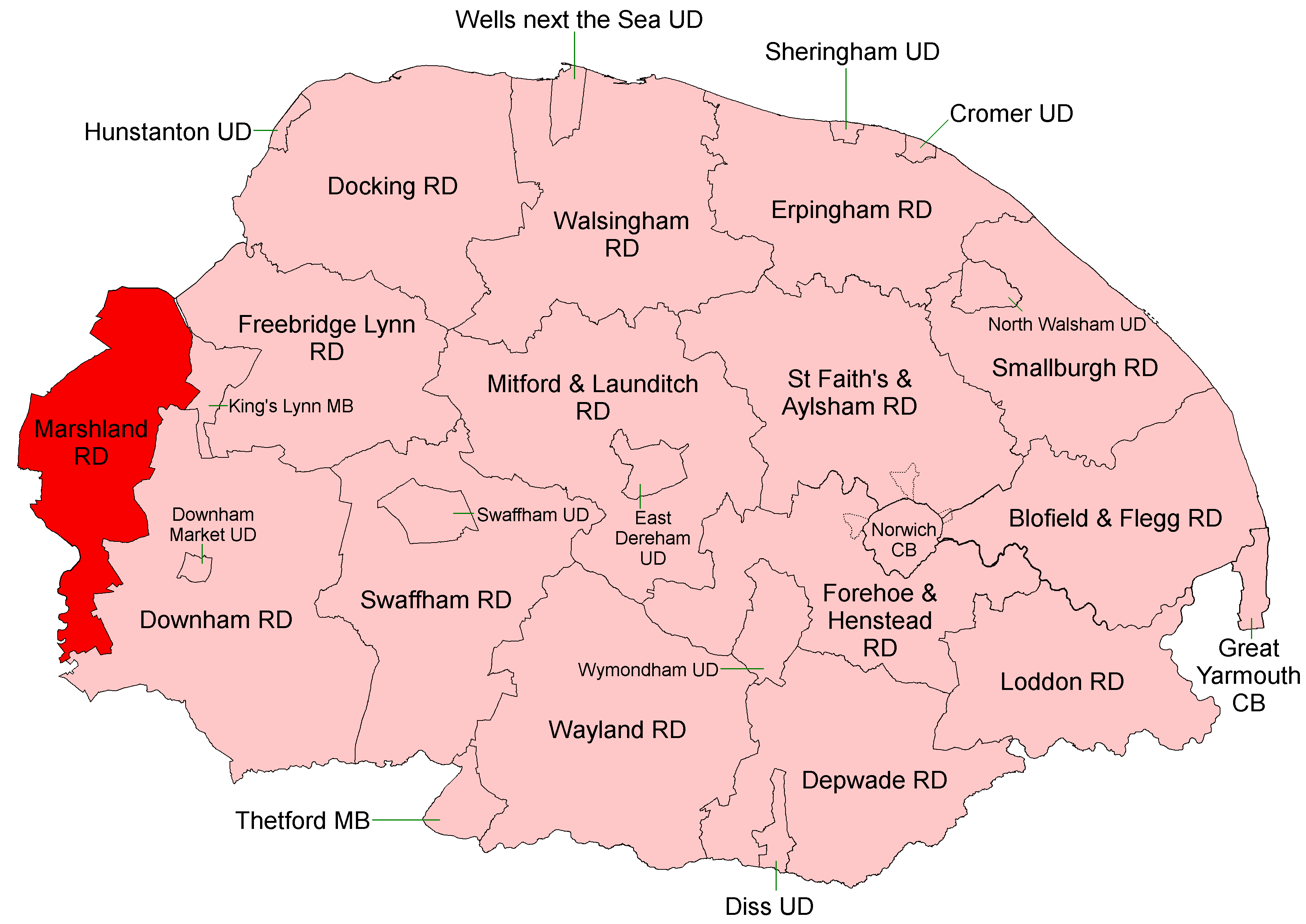
Boundaries in 1935

Marshland Rural District was a rural district in Norfolk, England from 1894 to 1974.

It was formed under the Local Government Act 1894 based on the Marshland rural sanitary district, and was named after the Freebridge Marshland hundred. It covered an area to the west of King's Lynn on the borders of Lincolnshire and the Isle of Ely.

In 1930 a new parish of Nordelph was created in Downham RD, taking land mostly out of the Marshland RD parishes of Upwell and Outwell.

During the period 1933-1935 it absorbed most of the area of the disbanded Walsoken Urban District, with other minor boundary changes.

In 1974, the district was abolished under the Local Government Act 1972, and became part of the West Norfolk district.

== Statistics ==
Year	Area (ha)	Population	Density (pop/ha)
1911	22,085	12,382	0.56
1921	22,085	15,589	0.71
1931	20,676	14,130	0.68
1951	22,890	16,570	0.72
1961	22,890	16,994	0.74

== Parishes ==
Parish	From	To	Notes
Clenchwarton			
Emneth			
Marshland St James	1935		Created from parts of 11 parishes
Outwell			
Terrington St Clement			
Terrington St John			
Tilney All Saints			
Tilney St Lawrence			
Tilney with Islington		1935	Most to Tilney St Lawrence, some to Marshland St James
Upwell			
Walpole St Andrew			
Walpole St Peter			
Walsoken	1934		Previously Walsoken UD
West Walton			
