= Depwade Rural District =

Former local government area in the UK

Coordinates: 52.43°N 1.23°E

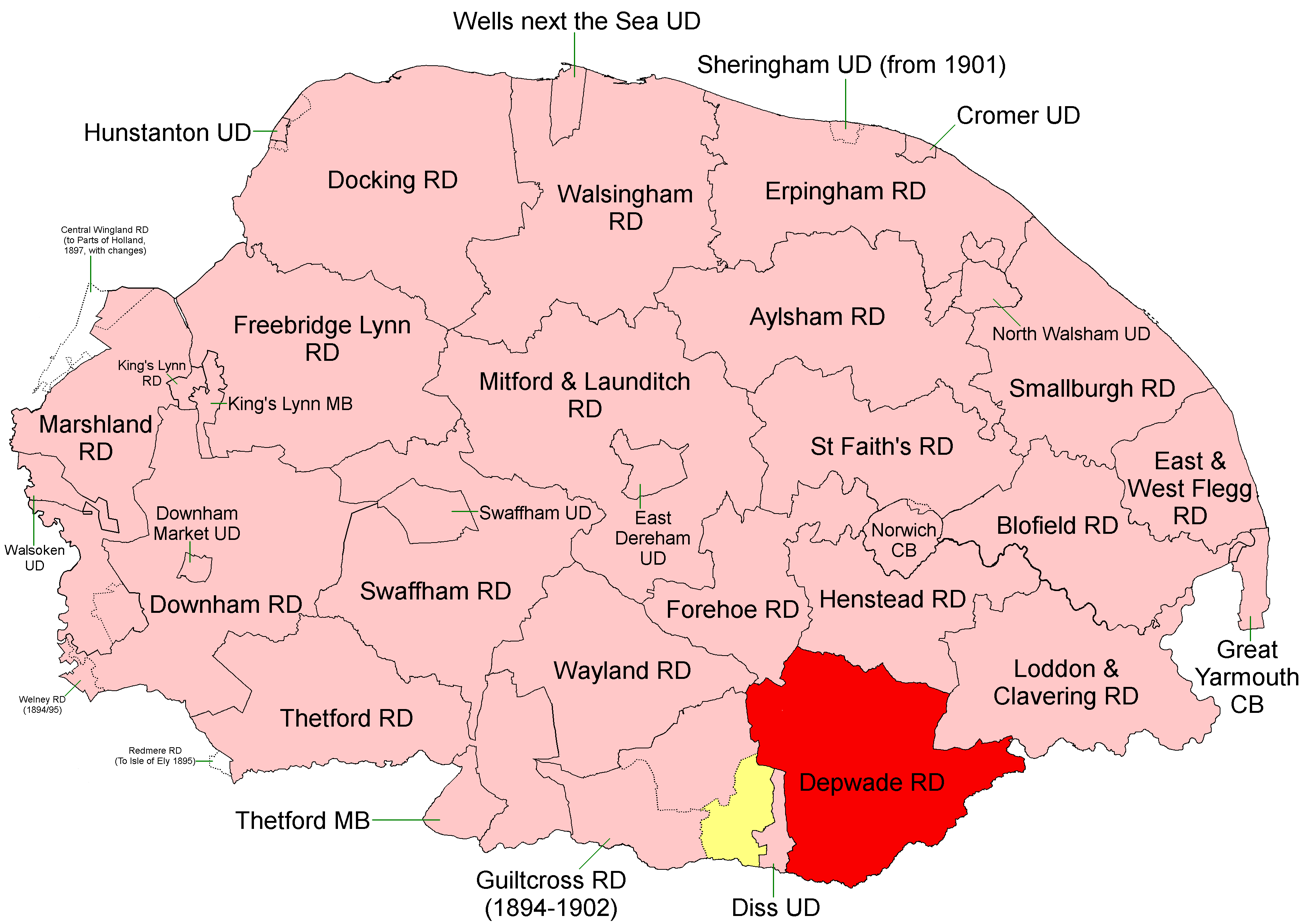
Boundaries in 1894. 1902 extension in yellow

Depwade Rural District was a rural district in Norfolk, England from 1894 to 1974.

It was formed under the Local Government Act 1894 based on the Depwade rural sanitary district, taking its name from the ancient Depwade hundred. It lay to the east of Diss Urban District.

In 1902 it took in the eastern part of the disbanded Guiltcross Rural District, thus completely encircling Diss except where that town bordered on Suffolk.

Thereafter its borders were unchanged until 1974, when the district was abolished under the Local Government Act 1972 and became part of the South Norfolk district.

== Statistics ==
| Year | Area (ha) | Population | Density (pop/ha) |
|---|---|---|---|
| 1911 | 32,271 | 19,933 | 0.62 |
| 1921 | 32,271 | 18,989 | 0.59 |
| 1931 | 32,271 | 17,690 | 0.55 |
| 1951 | 32,271 | 18,161 | 0.56 |
| 1961 | 32,271 | 17,332 | 0.54 |

== Parishes ==
| Parish | From | To | Notes |
|---|---|---|---|
| Alburgh | | | |
| Ashwellthorpe | | | |
| Aslacton | | | |
| Billingford | | 1935 | Added to Scole |
| Bressingham | 1902 | | Formerly Guiltcross RD |
| Brockdish | | | |
| Bunwell | | | |
| Burston | | | |
| Carleton Rode | | | |
| Denton | | | |
| Dickleburgh | | | |
| Earsham | | | |
| Fersfield | 1902 | 1935 | Formerly Guiltcross RD |
| Forncett | 1935 | | Merger of next 2 parishes |
| Forncett St Mary | | 1935 | |
| Forncett St Peter | | 1935 | |
| Fritton | | 1935 | Added to Morning Thorpe |
| Fundenhall | | 1935 | Added to Ashwellthorpe |
| Gissing | | | |
| Hapton | | 1935 | Added to Tharston |
| Hardwick | | 1935 | Added to Shelton |
| Hempnall | | | |
| Long Stratton | 1935 | | Merger of Stratton St Mary and Stratton St Michael |
| Morning Thorpe | | | |
| Moulton St Michael | | | |
| Needham | | | |
| Pulham Market | | | Pulham St Mary Magdalene before 1947 |
| Pulham St. Mary | | | Pulham St Mary the Virgin before 1947 |
| Redenhall with Harleston | | | |
| Roydon | 1902 | | Formerly Guiltcross RD |
| Rushall | | 1935 | Added to Dickleburgh |
| Scole | | | |
| Shelfanger | 1902 | | Formerly Guiltcross RD |
| Shelton | | | |
| Shimpling | | 1935 | Added to Burston |
| Starston | | | |
| Stratton St Mary | | 1935 | Component of Long Stratton |
| Stratton St Michael | | 1935 | Component of Long Stratton |
| Tacolneston | | | |
| Tasburgh | | | |
| Tharston | | | |
| Thelveton | | 1935 | Added to Scole |
| Thorpe Abbots | | 1935 | Added to Brockdish |
| Tibenham | | | |
| Tivetshall St Margaret | | | |
| Tivetshall St Mary | | | |
| Wacton | | | |
| Winfarthing | 1902 | | Formerly Guiltcross RD |
