= Docking Rural District =

Former district in Norfolk, England, UK

Coordinates: 52.90°N 0.60°E

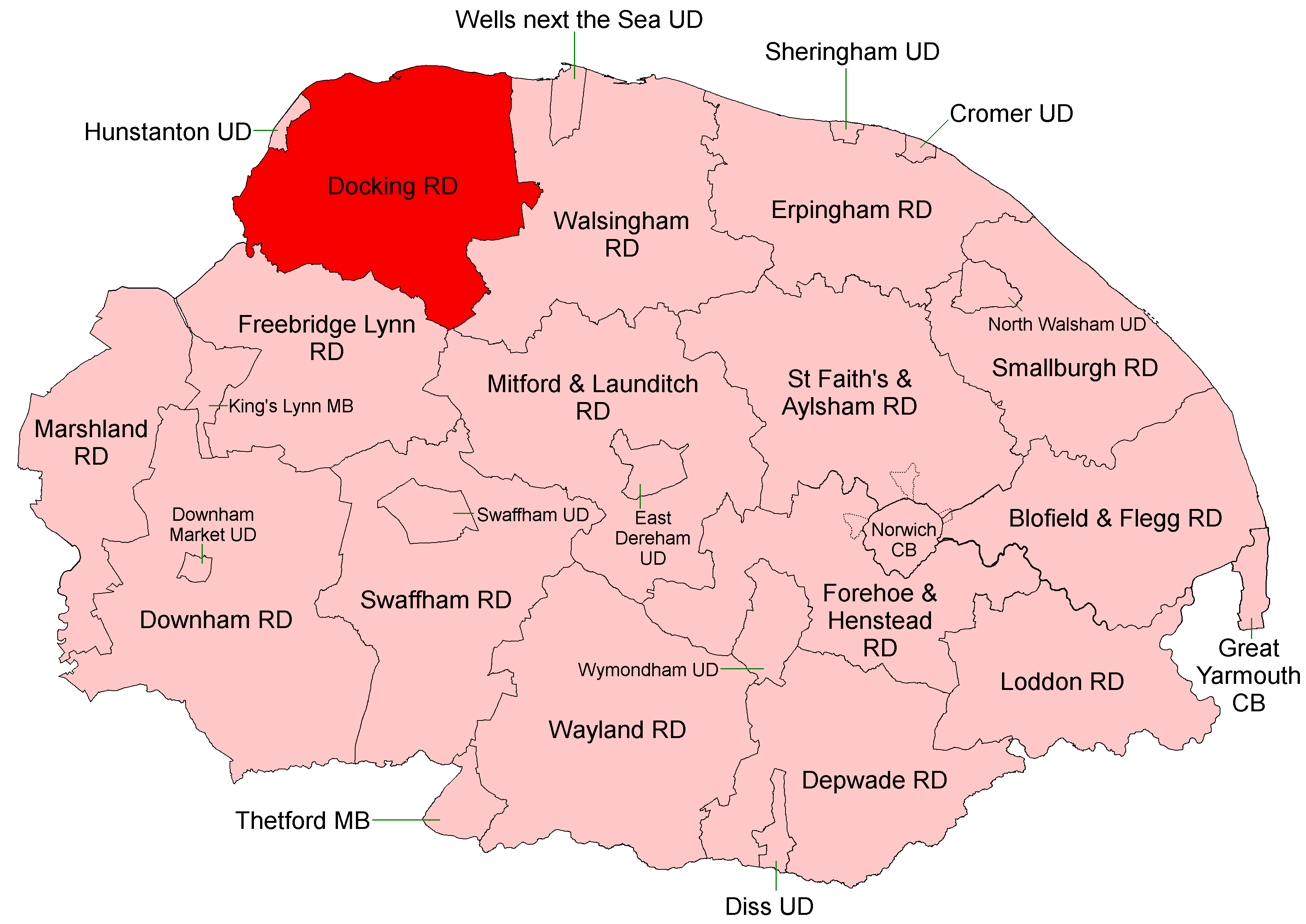
Boundaries in 1935

Docking Lynn Rural District was a rural district in Norfolk, England from 1894 to 1974.

It was formed under the Local Government Act 1894 based on the Docking rural sanitary district. It covered an area south and east of Hunstanton.

The only changes to its boundaries during its 80 years of existence were caused by a series of expansions of Hunstanton Urban District (1902, 1925 & 1928). In 1974, the district was abolished under the Local Government Act 1972, and became part of the West Norfolk district.

== Parishes ==
Parish	From	To	Notes
Anmer			
Bagthorpe		1935	Component of Bagthorpe with Barmer
Bagthorpe with Barmer	1935		Merger
Barmer		1935	Component of Bagthorpe with Barmer
Barwick			
Bircham	1935		Merger of Bircham Newton, Bircham Toft & Great Bircham
Bircham Newton		1935	Component of Bircham
Bircham Tofts		1935	Component of Bircham
Brancaster			
Burnham Deepdale		1935	Added to Brancaster
Burnham Market	1929		Burnham Westgate + Burnham Sutton...
Burnham Norton			
Burnham Overy			
Burnham Sutton com Burnham Ulph		1929	Component of Burnham Market
Burnham Thorpe			
Burnham Westgate		1929	Component of Burnham Market
Choseley			
Dersingham			
Docking			
East Rudham			
Fring			
Great Bircham		1935	Component of Bircham
Heacham			
Heywood			
Holme next the Sea			
Houghton			
Ingoldisthorpe			
North Creake			
Old Hunstanton			Known as Hunstanton before 1953
Ringstead			
Sedgeford			
Shernborne			
Snettisham			
South Creake			
Stanhoe			
Syderstone			
Thornham			
Titchwell			
Waterden		1953	Added to South Creake
West Rudham			
