= Erpingham Rural District =

Former local government district in Norfolk, United Kingdom

Coordinates: 52.86°N 1.19°E

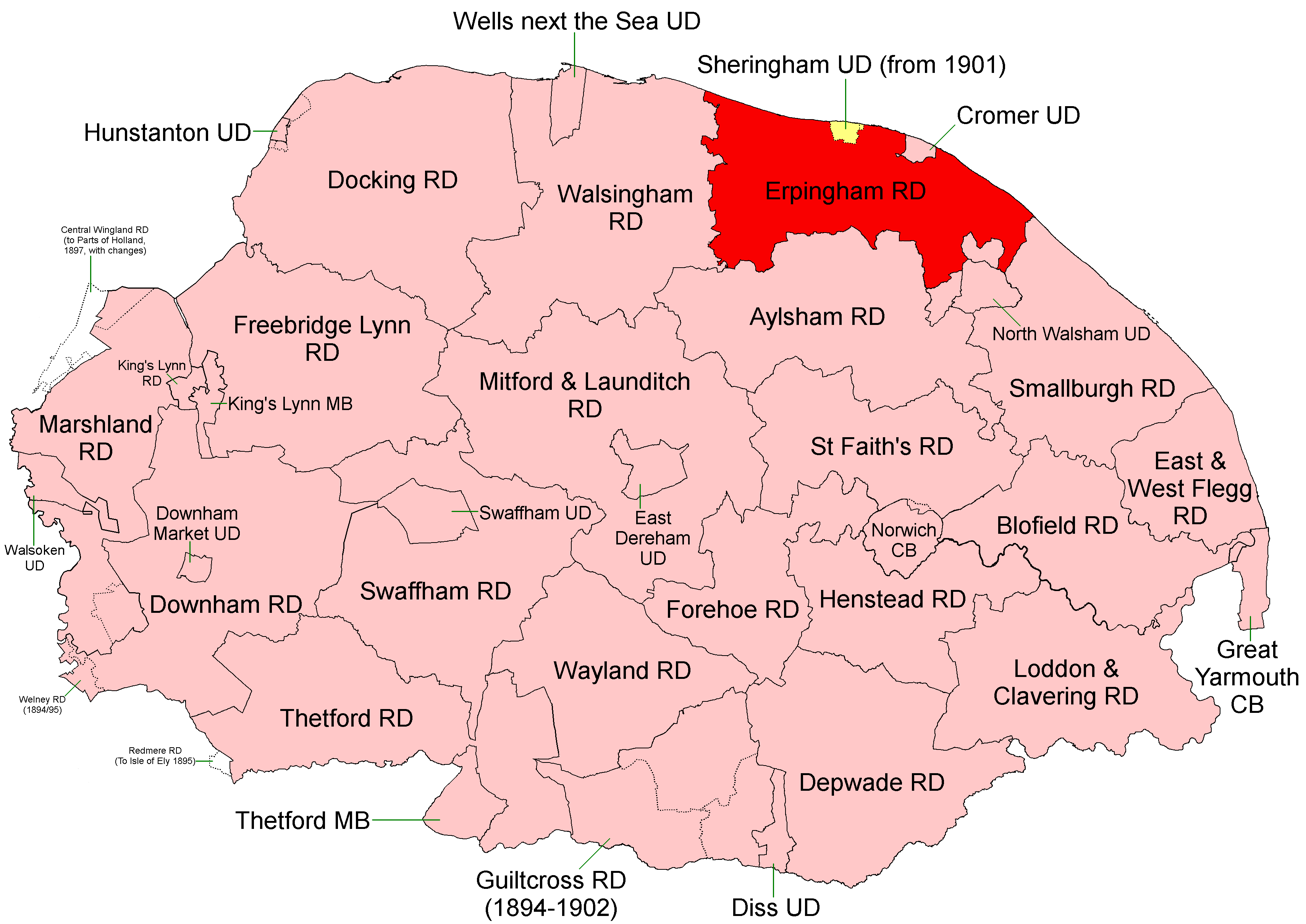
Boundaries in 1894. 1902 extension in yellow

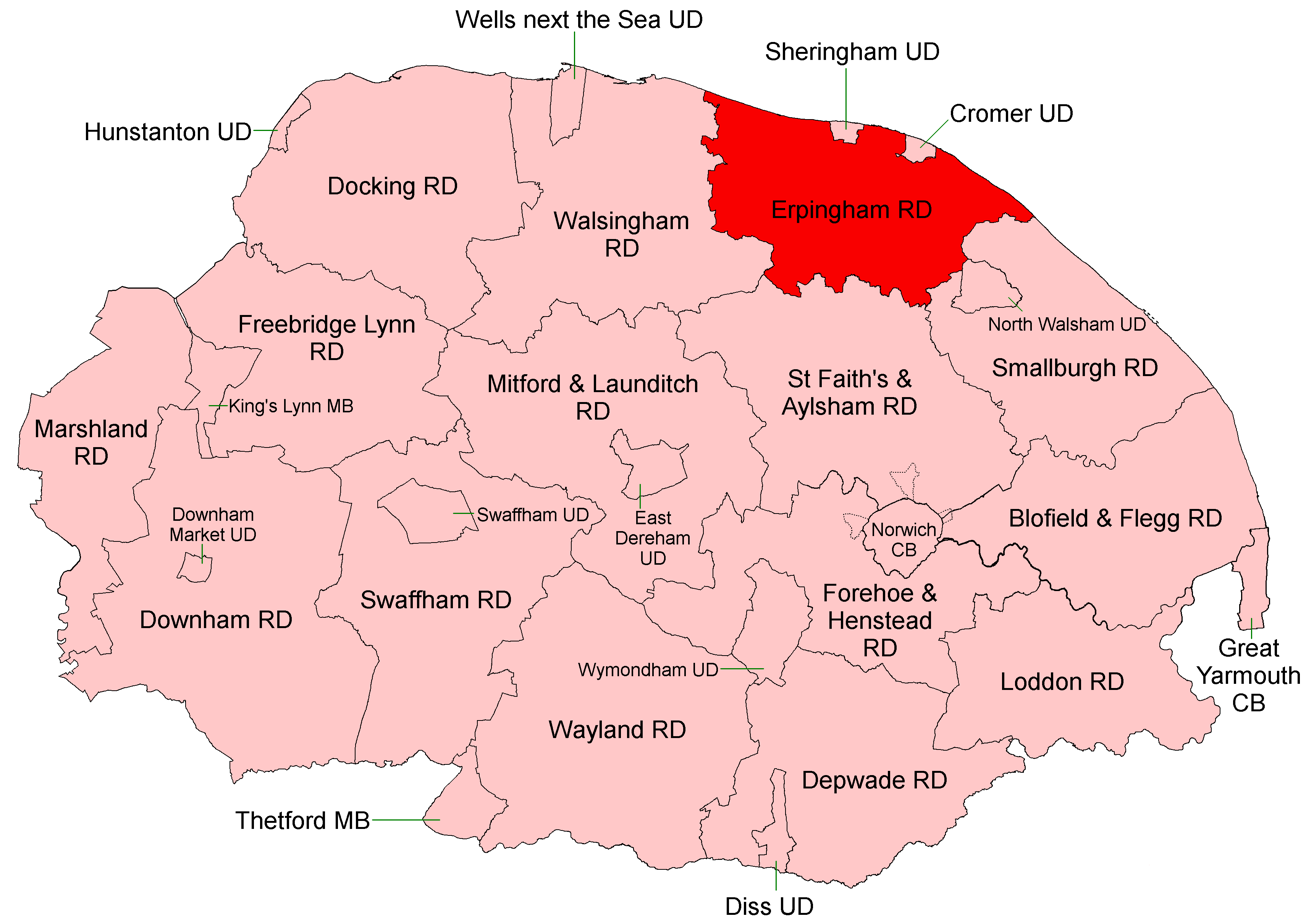
Boundaries in 1935

Erpingham Rural District was a rural district in Norfolk, England, from 1894 to 1974.

It was formed under the Local Government Act 1894 and was based on the Erpingham rural sanitary district, taking its name from the ancient North and South Erpingham hundreds – but initially did not include some parishes from these hundreds, including Erpingham parish itself. The Rural District (RD) lay on the north coast of Norfolk around the Urban Districts of Cromer and, later, Sheringham (created 1901, extended 1914).

In 1935, Erpingham RD took in several parishes from Aylsham Rural District, and ceded smaller areas to Walsingham and Smallburgh RDs.

In 1974, the district was abolished under the Local Government Act 1972, and became part of the North Norfolk district.

== Statistics ==
Year	Area (ha)	Population	Density (pop/ha)
1911	25,179	17,137	0.68
1921	25,158	17,890	0.71
1931	25,158	17,018	0.68
1951	28,777	19,516	0.68
1961	28,773	18,479	0.64

== Parishes ==
Parish	From	To	Notes
Alby with Thwaite	1935		Formerly Aylsham RD
Aldborough			
Antingham			
Aylmerton			
Baconsthorpe			
Barningham Norwood		1935	Added to Gresham
Barningham Winter		1935	Added to Matlask
Beeston Regis			
Bessingham		1935	Added to Sustead
Bodham			
Briston		1935	To Walsingham RD
Cley next the Sea			
Colby	1935		Formerly Aylsham RD (including Banningham)
Corpusty	1935		Formerly Aylsham RD (including Saxthorpe)
East Beckham			
Edgefield			
Erpingham	1935		Formerly Aylsham RD (including Calthorpe)
Felbrigg			
Gimingham			
Glandford with Bayfield		1935	See Letheringsett with Glandford
Gresham			
Gunton		1935	Added to Hanworth
Hanworth			
Hempstead			
High Kelling			
Holt			
Hunworth		1935	Added to Stody
Ingworth	1935		Formerly Aylsham RD
Itteringham	1935		Formerly Aylsham RD (including Mannington)
Kelling			
Knapton		1935	To Smallburgh RD
Letheringsett		1935	See Letheringsett with Glandford
Letheringsett with Glandford	1935		Merger of Letheringsett and Glandford with Bayfield
Little Barningham	1935		Formerly Aylsham RD
Matlask			
Metton		1935	Added to Sustead
Mundesley			
Northrepps			
Overstrand			
Plumstead			
Roughton			
Runton			
Salthouse			
Sheringham		1901	Partly formed Sheringham UD, rest as Upper Sheringham
Sidestrand			
Southrepps			
Stody			
Suffield			
Sustead			
Thornage			
Thorpe Market			
Thurgarton		1935	Added to Aldborough
Trimingham			
Trunch		1935	To Smallburgh RD
Upper Sheringham	1901		Formerly part of Sheringham parish
West Beckham			
Weybourne			
Wickmere			Formerly Aylsham RD (including Wolterton)
