= Freebridge Lynn Rural District =

Former local government area in the UK

Coordinates: 52.73°N 0.53°E

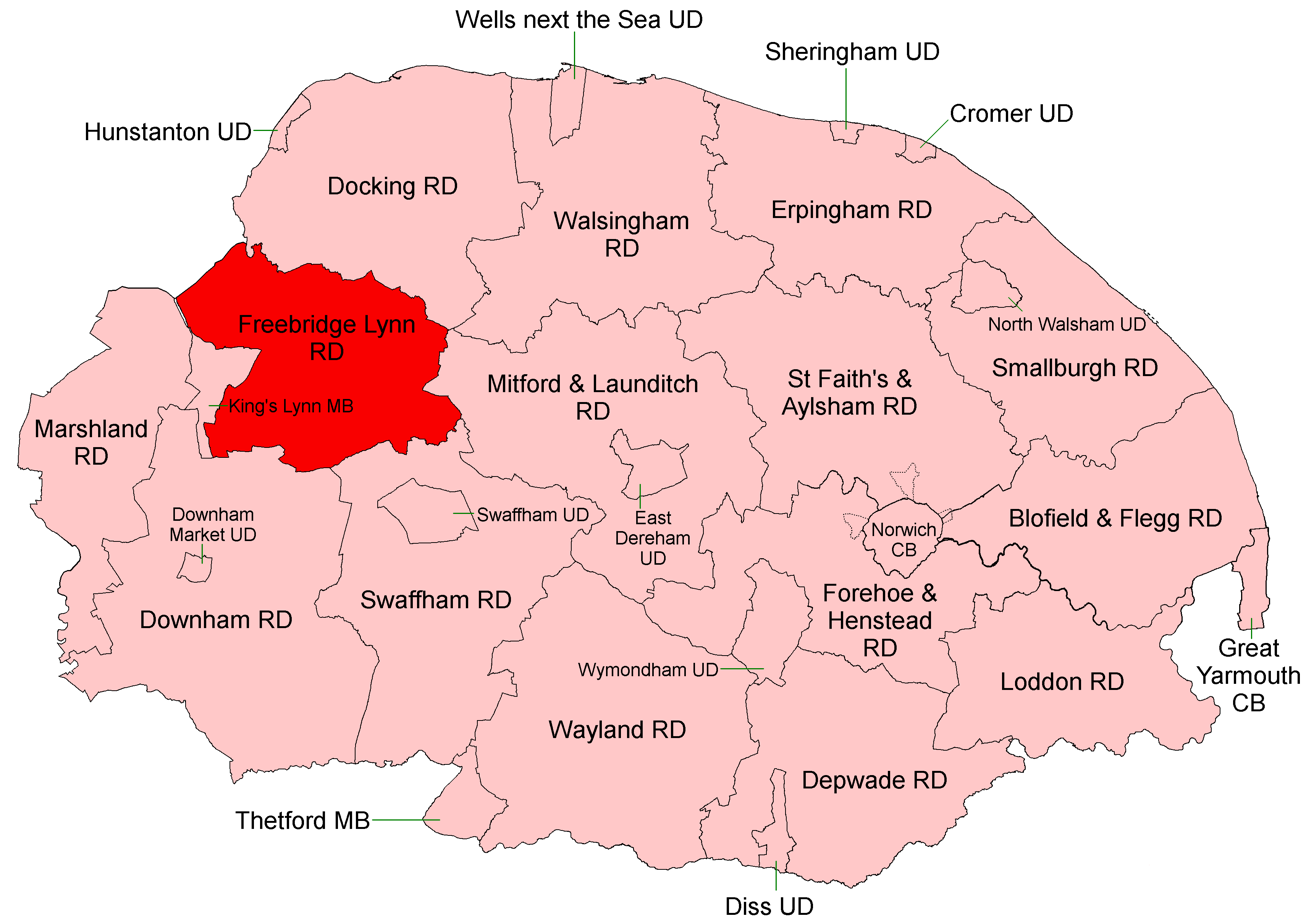
Boundaries in 1935

Freebridge Lynn Rural District was a rural district in Norfolk, England from 1894 to 1974.

It was formed under the Local Government Act 1894 based on the Freebridge Lynn rural sanitary district, and was named after the Freebridge Lynn hundred. It covered an area to the east of King's Lynn.

It was reduced somewhat in 1935 when under a County Review Order, the civil parishes of Gaywood and North Lynn became part of the borough of King's Lynn.

In 1974, the district was abolished under the Local Government Act 1972, and became part of the West Norfolk district.

== Parishes ==
Parish	From	To	Notes
Ashwicken		1935	Added to Leziate
Babingley		1935	Added to Sandringham
Bawsey			
Castle Acre			
Castle Rising			
Congham			
East Walton			
East Winch			
Flitcham with Appleton			
Gayton			
Gayton Thorpe		1935	Added to Gayton
Gaywood		1935	Transferred to King's Lynn MB
Great Massingham			
Grimston			
Harpley			
Hillington			
Leziate			
Little Massingham			
Middleton			
Mintlyn		1935	Added to Bawsey
North Lynn		1935	Transferred to King's Lynn MB
North Runcton			
North Wootton			
Pentney			
Roydon			
Sandringham			
Setchey		1935	Added to West Winch
South Wootton			
West Acre			
West Bilney		1935	Added to East Winch
West Newton		1935	Added to Sandringham
West Winch			
Wolferton		1935	Added to Sandringham
