= Mitford and Launditch Rural District =

Former local government area in the UK

Coordinates: 52.69°N 0.90°E

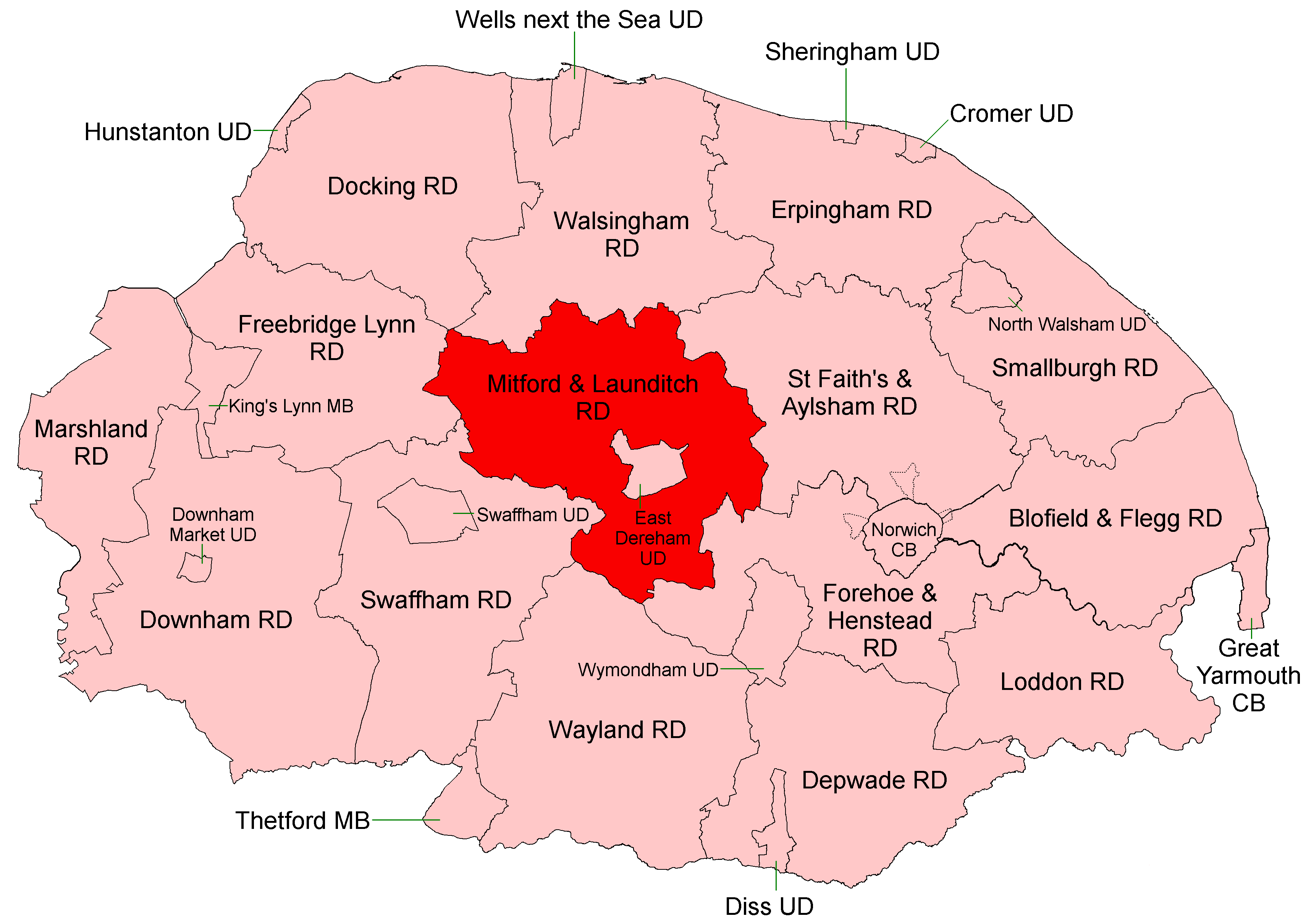
Boundaries on 1935 map.

Mitford and Launditch Rural District was a rural district in Norfolk, England from 1894 to 1974.

It was formed under the Local Government Act 1894 based on the Mitford and Launditch rural sanitary district, taking its name from the two ancient hundreds of Mitford and Launditch. It completely encircled East Dereham Urban District.

The district was abolished under the Local Government Act 1972 and became part of the Breckland district. Its boundaries never changed during its 80 year existence.

== Statistics ==
| Year | Area (ha) | Population | Density (pop/ha) |
|---|---|---|---|
| 1911 | 41,429 | 18,698 | 0.45 |
| 1921 | 41,429 | 17,945 | 0.43 |
| 1931 | 41,429 | 17,107 | 0.41 |
| 1951 | 41,429 | 18,113 | 0.44 |
| 1961 | 41,429 | 17,651 | 0.43 |

== Parishes ==
| Parish | From | To | Notes |
|---|---|---|---|
| Bawdeswell | | | |
| Beeston with Bittering | | | |
| Beetley | | | |
| Billingford | | | |
| Bintree | | | |
| Brisley | | | |
| Bylaugh | | | |
| Colkirk | | | |
| Cranworth | | | |
| East Bilney | | 1935 | Added to Beetley |
| East Lexham | | 1935 | Component of Lexham |
| East Tuddenham | | | |
| Elsing | | | |
| Foxley | | | |
| Fransham | 1935 | | Merger of Great Fransham and Ltttle Fransham |
| Garvestone | | | |
| Gateley | | | |
| Great Dunham | | | |
| Great Fransham | | 1935 | Component of Fransham |
| Gressenhall | | | |
| Guist | | | |
| Hardingham | | | |
| Hockering | | | |
| Hoe | | | |
| Horningtoft | | | |
| Kempstone | | | |
| Letton | | 1935 | Added to Cranworth |
| Lexham | 1935 | | Merger of East Lexham and West Lexham |
| Litcham | | | |
| Little Dunham | | | |
| Little Fransham | | 1935 | Component of Fransham |
| Longham | | | |
| Lyng | | | |
| Mattishall | | | |
| Mattishall Burgh | | 1935 | Added to Mattishall |
| Mileham | | | |
| North Elmham | | | |
| North Tuddenham | | | |
| Oxwick and Pattesley | | 1935 | Added to Colkirk |
| Reymerston | | 1935 | Added to Garveston |
| Rougham | | | |
| Scarning | | | |
| Shipdham | | | |
| Southburgh | | 1935 | Added to Cranworth |
| Sparham | | | |
| Stanfield | | | |
| Swanton Morley | | | |
| Thuxton | | 1935 | Added to Garveston |
| Tittleshall | | | |
| Twyford | | | |
| Weasenham All Saints | | | |
| Weasenham St Peter | | | |
| Wellingham | | | |
| Wendling | | 1935 | Component of Lexham |
| West Lexham | | | |
| Westfield | | 1935 | Component of Whinburgh |
| Whinburgh | | | |
| Whissonsett | | | |
| Woodrising | | 1935 | Added to Cranworth |
| Worthing | | 1935 | Added to Hoe |
| Yaxham | | | |
