= Loddon and Clavering Rural District =

Former local government area in the UK

Coordinates: 52.53°N 1.48°E

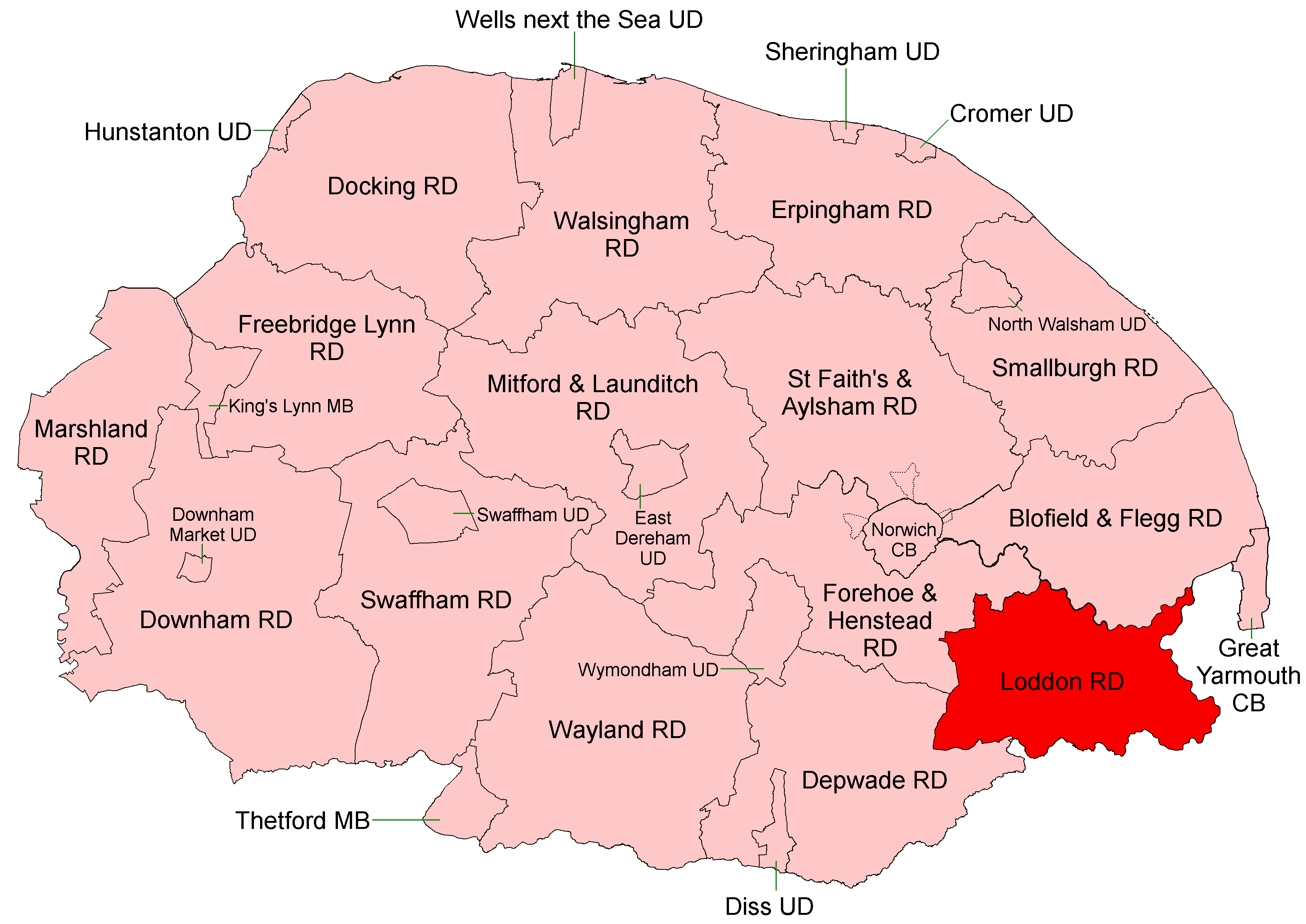
Boundaries in 1935

Loddon and Clavering Rural District was a rural district in Norfolk, England from 1894 to 1935, continuing, with very slight boundary changes, as Loddon Rural District until 1974.

It was formed under the Local Government Act 1894 based on the Loddon and Clavering rural sanitary district, and took its name from the ancient hundreds of Loddon and Clavering. It lay in the south-east corner of the county.

In 1974, the district was abolished under the Local Government Act 1972, and became part of the South Norfolk district.

== Statistics ==
Year	Area (ha)	Population	Density (pop/ha)
1911	24,392	12,550	0.51
1921	24,392	12,135	0.50
1931	24,392	11,822	0.48
1951	24,446	12,581	0.51
1961	24,446	12,113	0.50

== Parishes ==
Parish	From	To	Notes
Aldeby			
Alpington			
Ashby St Mary			
Bedingham			
Bergh Apton			
Brooke			
Broome			
Burgh St Peter			
Carleton St Peter			
Chedgrave			
Claxton			
Ditchingham			
Ellingham			
Geldeston			
Gillingham			
Haddiscoe			
Hales			
Hardley		1935	Component of Langley with Hardley
Heckingham			
Hedenham			
Hellington			
Howe			
Kirby Cane			
Kirstead			
Langley		1935	See next
Langley with Hardley	1935		Merger
Loddon			
Mundham			
Norton Subcourse			
Raveningham			
Seething			
Sisland			
Stockton			
Thorpe-next-Haddiscoe		1935	Added to Haddiscoe
Thurlton			
Thurton			
Thwaite			
Toft Monks			
Topcroft			
Wheatacre			
Woodton			
Yelverton			
