= Smallburgh Rural District =

Former local government district in Norfolk, United Kingdom

Coordinates: 52.77°N 1.51°E

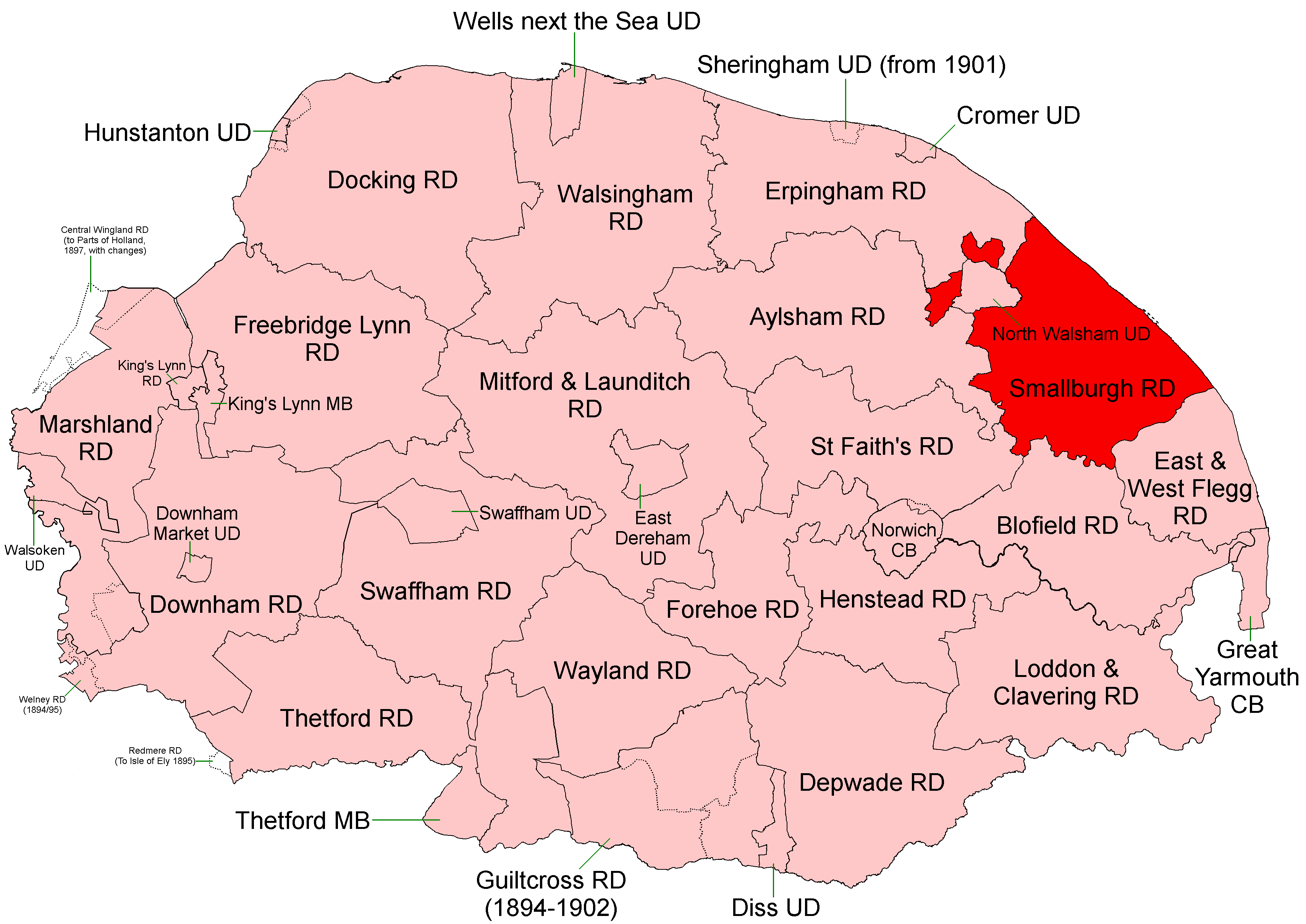
Boundaries in 1894.

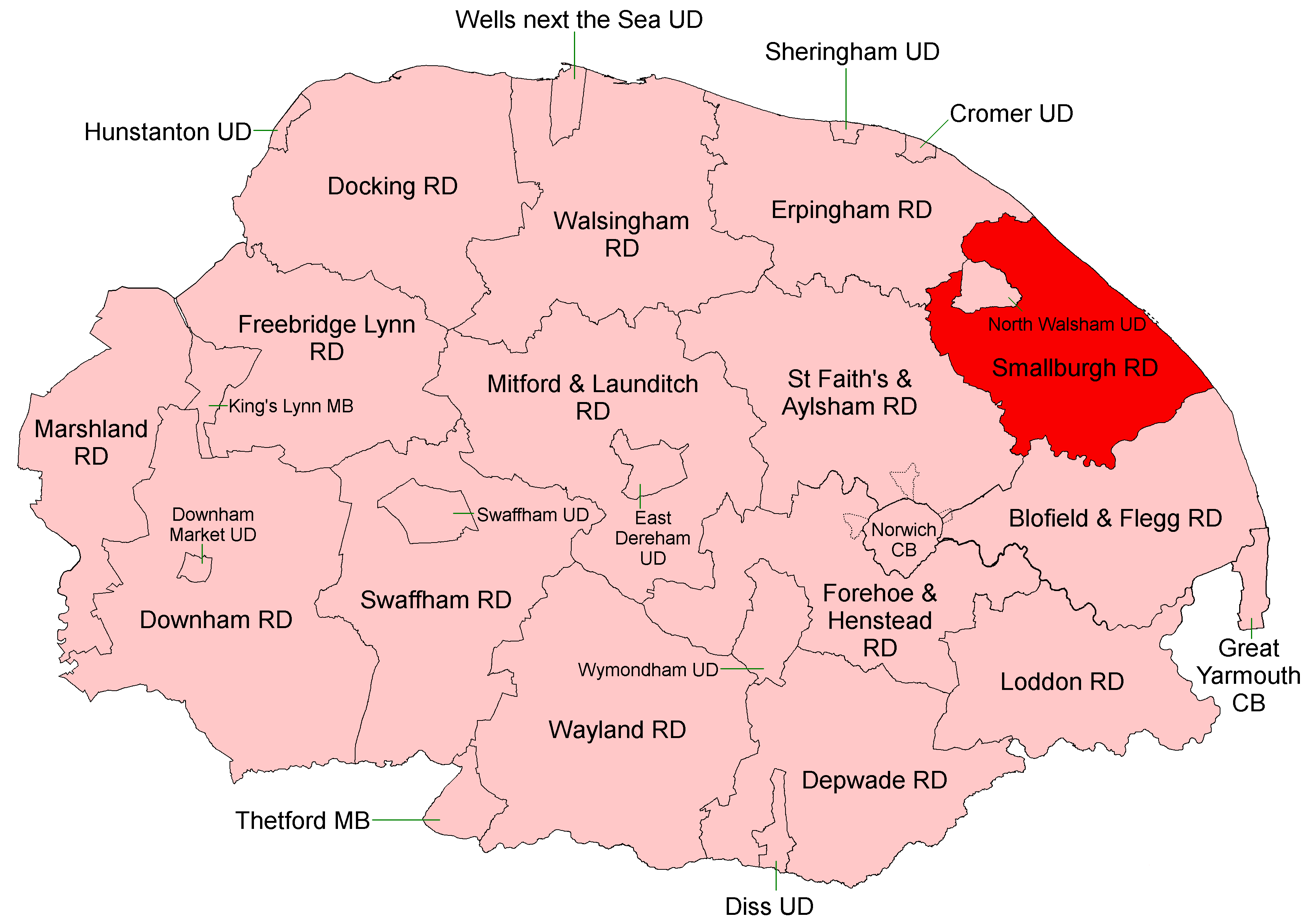
Boundaries in 1935

Smallburgh Rural District was a rural district in Norfolk, England from 1894 to 1974.

It was formed under the Local Government Act 1894 based on the Smallburgh rural sanitary district. Lying to the south-east of North Walsham it originally had two small areas detached from it main body.

In 1935 it took in parts of Aylsham and Erpingham RDs, thus joining up into a single extent.

In 1974, the district was abolished under the Local Government Act 1972, and became part of the North Norfolk district.

== Statistics ==
| Year | Area (ha) | Population | Density (pop/ha) |
|---|---|---|---|
| 1911 | 25,345 | 13,424 | 0.53 |
| 1921 | 25,345 | 13,905 | 0.55 |
| 1931 | 25,345 | 13,986 | 0.55 |
| 1951 | 28,335 | 18,429 | 0.65 |
| 1961 | 28,335 | 17,376 | 0.61 |

== Parishes ==
| Parish | From | To | Notes |
|---|---|---|---|
| Ashmanhaugh | | | |
| Bacton | | | |
| Barton Turf | | | |
| Beeston St Lawrence | | 1935 | Added to Ashmanhaugh |
| Bradfield | | 1935 | Added to Swafield |
| Brumstead | | | |
| Catfield | | | |
| Crostwight | | 1935 | Added to Honing |
| Dilham | | | |
| East Ruston | | | |
| Edingthorpe | | 1935 | Added to Bacton |
| Felmingham | | | |
| Happisburgh | | | |
| Hempstead with Eccles | | 1935 | Added to Lessingham |
| Hickling | | | |
| Honing | | | |
| Horning | | | |
| Horsey | | | |
| Hoveton | 1935 | | Merger of 2 following parishes |
| Hoveton St John | | 1935 | |
| Hoveton St Peter | | 1935 | |
| Ingham | | | |
| Irstead | | | |
| Knapton | | | Formerly Erpingham RD. From 1935-1950 included in Paston |
| Lessingham | | | |
| Ludham | | | |
| Neatishead | | | |
| Palling | | | |
| Paston | | | |
| Potter Heigham | | | |
| Ridlington | | 1935 | Added to Witton |
| Sco Ruston | | 1935 | Added to Tunstead |
| Scottow | 1935 | | Formerly Aylsham RD |
| Sea Palling | | | |
| Skeyton | 1935 | | Formerly Aylsham RD |
| Sloley | | | |
| Smallburgh | | | |
| Stalham | | | |
| Sutton | | | |
| Swafield | | | |
| Swanton Abbott | 1935 | | Formerly Aylsham RD |
| Trunch | 1935 | | Formerly Erpingham RD |
| Tunstead | | | |
| Walcott | | 1935 | Added to Happisburgh |
| Waxham | | 1935 | Added to Palling |
| Westwick | | | |
| Witton | | | |
| Worstead | | | |
