= Downham Rural District =

Former local government area in the UK

Coordinates: 52.58°N 0.44°E

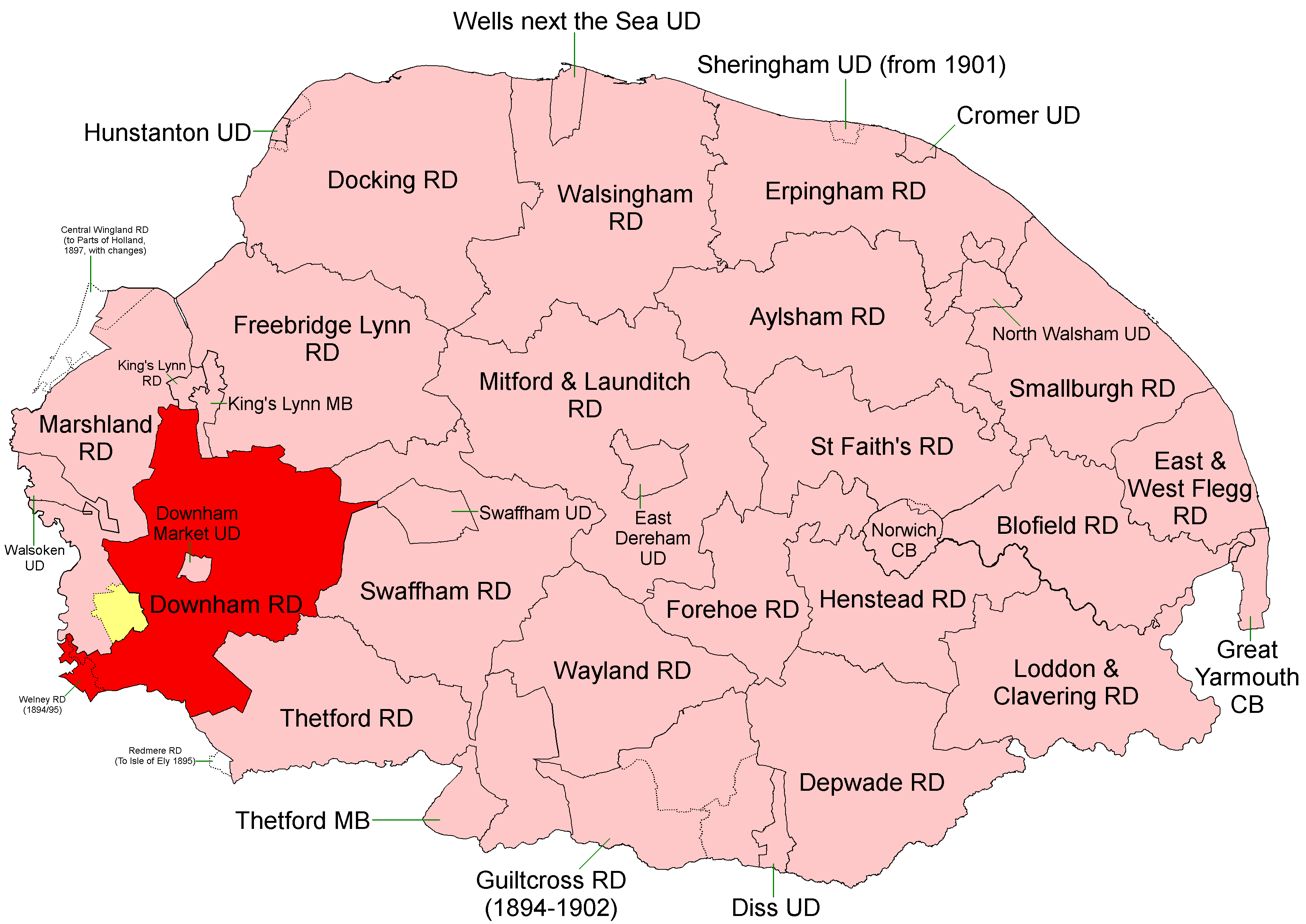
Boundaries in 1894. 1930 extension in yellow.

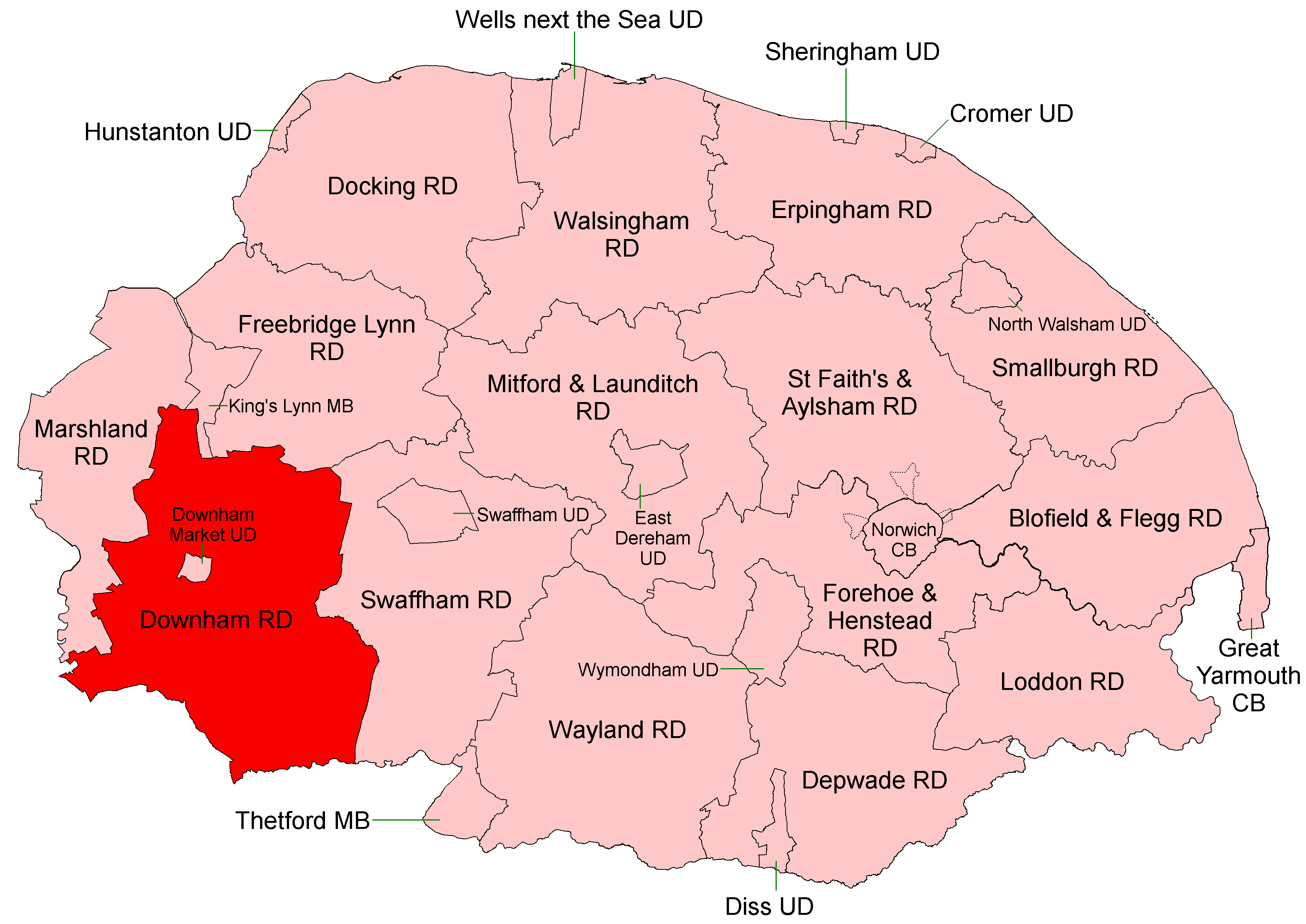
Boundaries in 1935

Downham Rural District was a rural district in Norfolk, England from 1894 to 1974.

It was formed under the Local Government Act 1894 based on the Downham rural sanitary district. It completely encircled Downham Market Urban District.

In 1930 a new parish of Nordelph was created in Downham RD, taking land mostly out of the Marshland RD parish of Upwell.

Several changes were made to its boundaries in 1935. In particular, it took in four large (in area terms) parishes from the disbanded Thetford Rural District.

In 1974, the district was abolished under the Local Government Act 1972, and became part of the West Norfolk district, renamed King's Lynn and West Norfolk in 1981.

== Welney Rural District ==
Welney Rural District was (at least nominally) a short-lived entity created in 1894 containing one parish, West Welney, which had been in Downham RSD but lay in the Isle of Ely rather than Norfolk. Its population at the time was about 500. In 1895 the parish was transferred to Norfolk, and Welney RD was absorbed by Downham RD. There does not appear to be any evidence that it ever actually functioned.

== Statistics ==
Year	Area (ha)	Population	Density (pop/ha)
1911	33,156	15,527	0.47
1921	33,156	14,660	0.44
1931	34,565	15,503	0.45
1951	50,243	24,496	0.49
1961	50,243	23,655	0.47

== Parishes ==
Parish	From	To	Notes
Barton Bendish			
Bexwell		1935	Added to Ryston
Boughton			
Crimplesham			
Denver			
Downham West			
Feltwell	1935		Formerly Thetford RD
Fincham			
Fordham			
Hilgay			
Hockwold cum Wilton	1935		Formerly Thetford RD
Marham			
Methwold	1935		Formerly Thetford RD
Nordelph	1930		Created from parts of Denver, Downham West & Stow Bardolph and from Outwell and Upwell in Marshland RD
Northwold	1935		Formerly Thetford RD
Runcton Holme			
Ryston			
Ryston with Roxham		1935	Added to Ryston
Shouldham			
Shouldham Thorpe			
Southery			
Stoke Ferry			
Stow Bardolph			
Stradsett			
Tottenhill			
Watlington			
Welney			
Wereham			
West Dereham			
West Welney	1895	1935	Welney RD 1894-95. Added to Welney 1935
Wiggenhall St Germans			As "Wiggenhall St German" before 1935
Wiggenhall St Mary Magdalen			
Wiggenhall St Mary the Virgin			
Wiggenhall St Peter		1935	Added to Wiggenhall St Germans
Wimbotsham			
Wormegay			
Wretton			
