= Walsingham Rural District =

Former local government area in the UK

Coordinates: 52.90°N 0.94°E

Walsingham
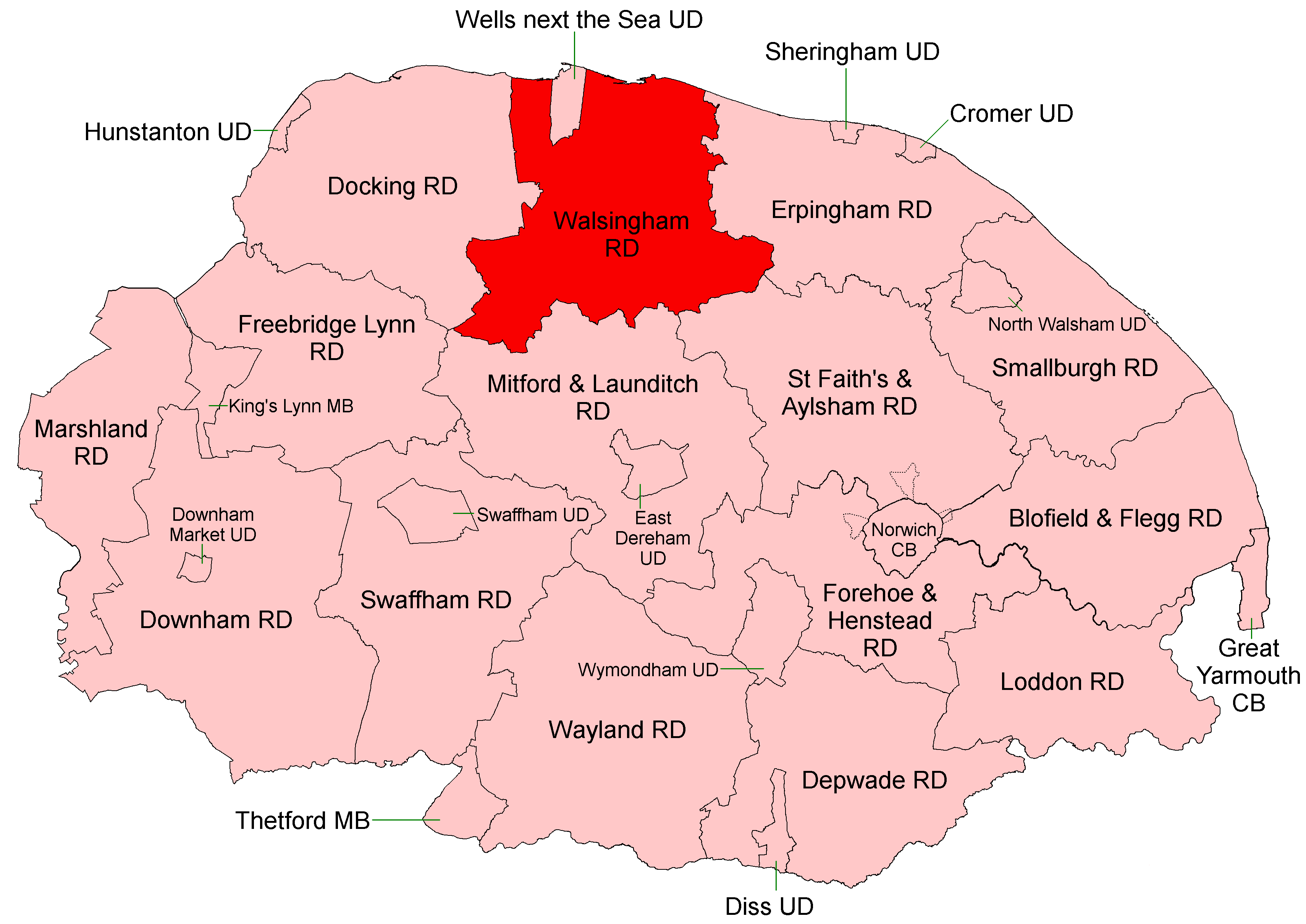
- Boundaries from 1935
- History
  - Created: 1894
  - Abolished: 1974
  - Succeeded by: North Norfolk
- Status: Rural district
  - HQ: Fakenham
- Coat of arms of the rural district council

Walsingham Rural District was a rural district in the county of Norfolk, England. It was created in 1894. On 1 April 1935 it was enlarged by the addition of the parishes of Hindolveston, Thurning, Wood Norton (from the disbanded Aylsham Rural District) and Briston (from the Erpingham Rural District). Although named after Walsingham, the Council was based at Baron's Hall in Fakenham. On 1 April 1974 it was abolished under the Local Government Act 1972, and has since formed part of the District of North Norfolk.

== Statistics ==
Year	Area (ha)	Population	Density (pop/ha)
1911	32,374	17,250	0.53
1921	32,374	16,214	0.50
1931	32,374	15,815	0.49
1951	35,944	22,893	0.64
1961	35,944	20,890	0.58

== Parishes ==
Parish	From	To	Notes
Alethorpe		1935	Added to Little Snoring
Bale		1935	Added to Gunthorpe
Barney		1935	Component of Fulmodeston
Barsham	1935		Merger of East, North & West Barsham and Houghton St Giles
Binham			
Blakeney			
Briningham			
Brinton			
Briston	1935		Formerly Erpingham RD
Cockthorpe		1935	Added to Binham
Dunton	1935		Merger of Dunton cum Doughton, Shereford & Toftrees
Dunton cum Doughton		1935	Component of Dunton
East Barsham		1935	Component of Barsham
East Raynham		1935	Component of Raynham
Egmere		1935	Added to Great Walsingham
Fakenham			
Field Dalling			
Fulmodeston	1935		Merger of Barney, Fulmodeston cum Croxton & Thursford
Fulmodeston cum Croxton		1935	Component of Fulmodeston
Great Ryburgh			
Great Snoring			
Great Walsingham			
Gunthorpe			
Helhoughton			
Hempton			
Hindolveston	1935		Formerly Aylsham RD
Hindringham			
Holkham			
Houghton St Giles		1935	Component of Barsham
Kettlestone			
Langham			
Little Ryburgh			
Little Snoring			
Little Walsingham			
Melton Constable			
Morston			
North Barsham		1935	Component of Barsham
Pensthorpe		1935	Added to Kettlestone
Pudding Norton			
Quarles		1935	Added to Great Walsingham
Raynham	1935		Merger of East, South & West Raynham
Saxlingham		1935	Added to Field Dalling
Sculthorpe			
Sharrington		1935	Added to Brinton
Shereford		1935	Component of Dunton
South Raynham		1935	Component of Raynham
Stibbard			
Stiffkey			
Swanton Novers			
Tatterford		1935	Added to Tattersett
Tattersett			
Testerton		1935	Added to Pudding Norton
Thurning	1935		Formerly Aylsham RD
Thursford			From 1935 to 1950 part of Fulmodeston
Toftrees		1935	Component of Dunton
Warham			
West Barsham		1935	Component of Barsham
West Raynham		1935	Component of Raynham
Wighton			
Wiveton			
Wood Norton	1935		Formerly Aylsham RD
