= Wayland Rural District =

Former Rural District in Norfolk, England

Coordinates: 52.54°N 0.88°E

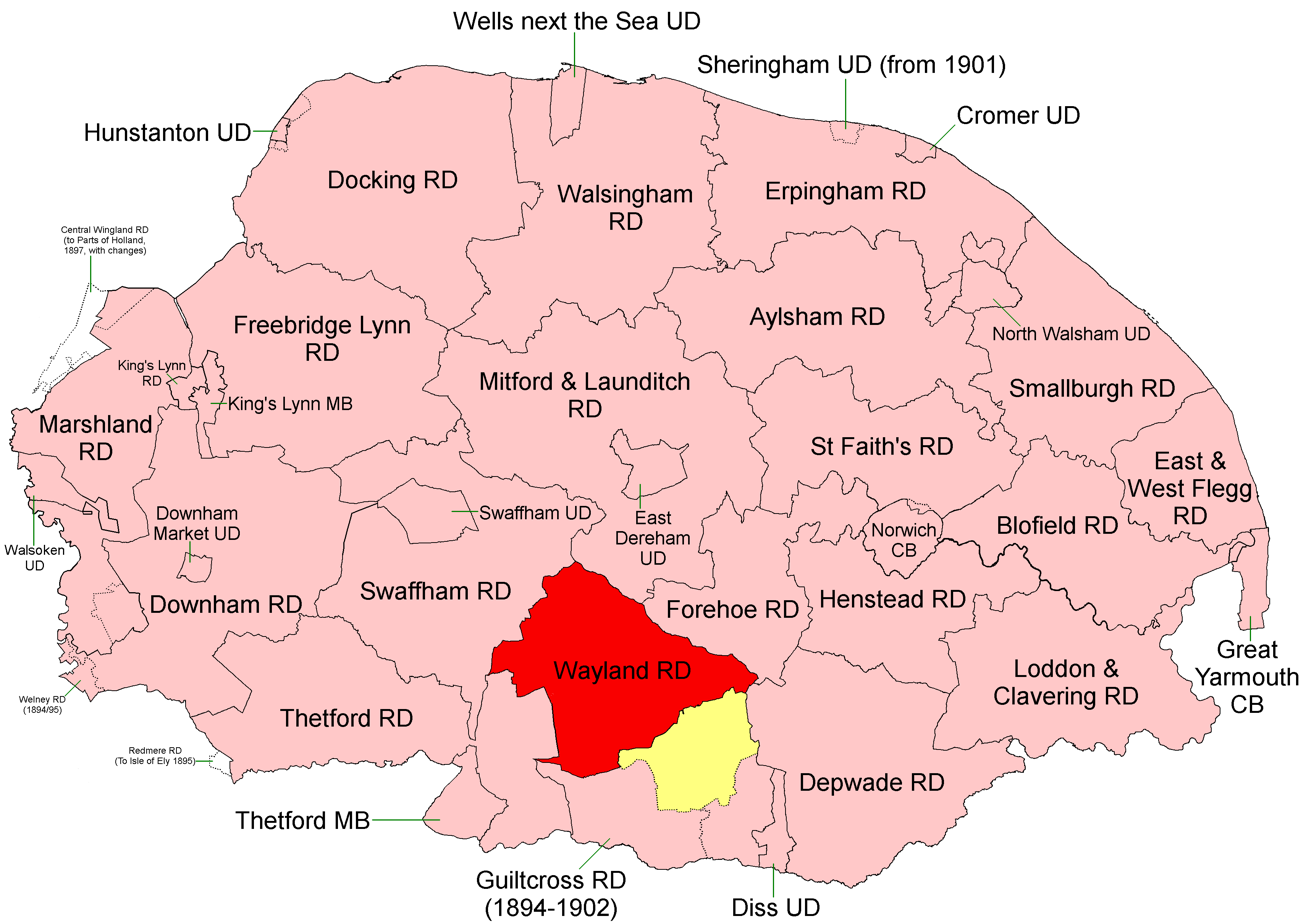
Boundaries in 1894. 1902 extension in yellow

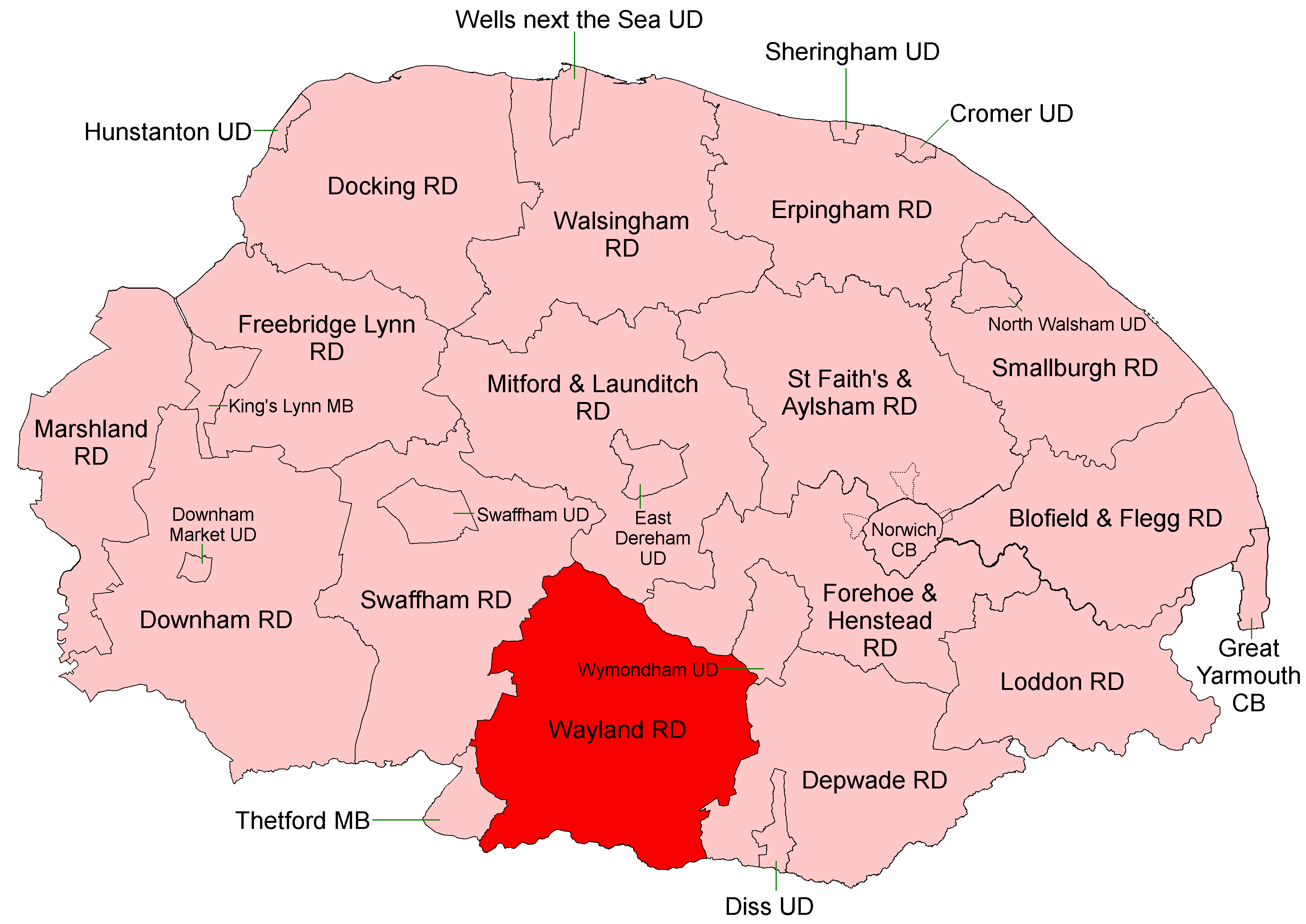
Boundaries in 1935

Wayland Rural District was a rural district in Norfolk, England from 1894 to 1974.

It was formed under the Local Government Act 1894 based on the Wayland rural sanitary district, taking its name from the ancient Wayland hundred. It lay in the central southern part of the county.

In 1902 it took in the northern part of the disbanded Guiltcross Rural District, and in 1935 the eastern section of the disbanded Thetford Rural District (much of which had also been transferred from Guiltcross RD).

In 1974, the district was abolished under the Local Government Act 1972, and became part of the Breckland district.

== Statistics ==
Year	Area (ha)	Population	Density (pop/ha)
1911	27,832	14,425	0.52
1921	27,832	13,121	0.47
1931	27,832	13,150	0.47
1951	43,254	20,643	0.48
1961	43,254	19,413	0.45

== Parishes ==
Parish	From	To	Notes
Attleborough			
Banham	1902		Formerly Guiltcross RD
Besthorpe			
Blo' Norton	1935		Formerly Thetford RD (ex Guiltcross RD)
Breckles		1935	Added to Stow Bedon
Brettenham	1935		Formerly Thetford RD
Bridgham	1935		Formerly Thetford RD (ex Guiltcross RD)
Carbrooke			
Caston			
Croxton	1935		Formerly Thetford RD
Garboldisham	1935		Formerly Thetford RD (ex Guiltcross RD)
Great Ellingham			
Griston			
Hargham		1935	Added to Quidenham
East Harling			Merger of East Harling and West Harling (from Thetford RD, ex Guiltcross RD)
Great Hockham			
Illington		1935	Added to Wretham
Kenninghall	1902		Formerly Guiltcross RD
Kilverstone	1935		Formerly Thetford RD
Larling		1935	Added to Roudham
Little Ellingham			
Merton			
New Buckenham	1902		Formerly Guiltcross RD
North Lopham	1935		Formerly Thetford RD (ex Guiltcross RD)
Old Buckenham	1902		Formerly Guiltcross RD
Ovington			
Quidenham	1902		Formerly Guiltcross RD
Riddlesworth	1935		Formerly Thetford RD (ex Guiltcross RD)
Rocklands	1935		Merger of next 2 parishes
Rockland All Saints and St Andrew		1935	
Rockland St Peter		1935	
Roudham			
Scoulton			
Shropham			
Snetterton			
South Lopham	1935		Formerly Thetford RD (ex Guiltcross RD)
Stow Bedon			
Thompson			
Tottington			
Watton			
Wilby	1902	1935	Formerly Guiltcross RD. Added to Quidenham
Wretham	1935		Formerly Thetford RD
