= Wayland, Norfolk =

Historic hundred in the district of Breckland, county Norfolk, England

Coordinates: 52.53°N 0.89°E

Wayland is an area in the district of Breckland within the English county of Norfolk. It is situated approximately 20 miles west of Norwich.

The area is a historic hundred, and was originally called Wanelunt, or Waneland. It centres on the town of Watton, and encompasses the villages of Ashill, Carbrooke, Caston, Great Cressingham, Great Hockham, Griston, Little Cressingham with Threxton, Merton, Ovington, Saham Toney, Scoulton, Stow Bedon with Breckles, and Thompson.

The area is crossed by the Peddars Way, a 46-mile footpath that follows the route of a Roman road, and is the location of Wayland Wood, famed as the setting for the Babes in the Wood legend.

Wayland has a local newspaper and many local businesses. The Chamber of Commerce also maintains an information directory of local organisations contact details.
