= Lopham =

Lopham may refer to:

- North Lopham
- South Lopham
