= Ashill, Norfolk =

Village in Norfolk, England

Coordinates: 52.602°N 0.782°E

Ashill
- Location within Norfolk
- Area: 12.26 km^{2} (4.73 sq mi)
- Population: 1,508 (2021 Census)
  - Density: 123/km^{2} (320/sq mi)
- OS grid reference: TF885041
- District: Breckland
- Shire county: Norfolk
- Region: East
- Country: England
- Sovereign state: United Kingdom
- Post town: THETFORD
- Postcode district: IP25
- Dialling code: 01760
- Police: Norfolk
- Fire: Norfolk
- Ambulance: East of England
- UK Parliament: South West Norfolk
- Website: https://ashillparishcouncil.norfolkparishes.gov.uk/

Ashill (pronounced Ash-ill) is a village and civil parish in Breckland, Norfolk, England. The civil parish had a population of 1,508 at the 2021 Census. Its historic centre includes a green and duck pond, and the parish church, the Church of St Nicholas, is a Grade I listed medieval building.

== History ==
The name Ashill derives from the Old English words æsc and lēah, meaning "ash-tree wood"; it was recorded in the Domesday Book as Asscelea. In 1086, Ashill was listed in the hundred of Wayland and had a recorded population of 44 households.

Panworth Ditch, also known as Devil's Dyke, is a linear earthwork on Ashill Common. Norfolk Heritage Explorer describes it as being of uncertain date, possibly Iron Age, Roman or Early Saxon. Historic England lists Devil's Dyke, Ashill, as a scheduled monument.

The village centre includes a green and pond; according to a local history account, drovers travelling to Swaffham market stayed overnight on the green while their cattle grazed and drank from the pond.

== Geography ==
Ashill is a civil parish in the Breckland district of Norfolk. The parish covers 12.26 km^{2} (4.73 sq mi).

The parish borders Saham Toney, Great Cressingham, Holme Hale, North Pickenham and South Pickenham. Ashill Common lies within the parish, and the village green and village common are used as public open spaces.

== Demography ==
At the 2021 Census, Ashill civil parish had a population of 1,508 and 705 households. This was an increase from 1,411 at the 2011 Census and 1,426 at the 2001 Census.

== Community and amenities ==
Ashill Voluntary Controlled Primary School is a Church of England primary school for children aged 4 to 11, with a capacity of 109 places. The first school in Ashill opened in 1848, funded by money raised by Reverend Bartholomew Edwards. In 1876, the National Society built a school house and adjoining classroom, and the school became Ashill National School. A kitchen was added in 1947, and the school house was taken over by Norfolk Education Committee in 1957 before being sold in 1979. The present school building opened in 1989, with an extension to the hall, kitchen and office space completed in November 2019.

Ashill Community Centre includes a large hall, small hall, stage, meeting room, kitchen and parking. The adjacent playing field has a football pitch, tennis court, basketball court, outdoor gym equipment and children's play facilities. The village also has allotments maintained by the parish council.

The AVA Call In is a community building beside the village pond and near the green. It is run by AVA, Ashill Village Aid, a charity set up in 1978 to support residents through a network of volunteers and contacts. The flint-and-brick building hosts village clubs and activities, and is home to the Village Archive and History Group, whose archive holds documents and photographs relating to Ashill.

The village has a pub and restaurant, The White Hart, and a convenience store, Ashill Food & Wine.

== Church of St Nicholas ==
The parish church of Ashill is the Church of England Church of St Nicholas, on Church Street. It is a medieval building, constructed mainly of flint with ashlar and some brick dressings. The church is Grade I listed and was first listed on 23 June 1960.

The building has a west tower, nave with south aisle, south porch, chancel and north vestry. Historic England records the west tower as early 14th-century, while the two-storey south porch is 15th-century. Inside, the church includes a six-bay south arcade, piscinae in the south aisle and chancel, and a 19th-century chancel screen incorporating fragments of a medieval screen. The church also contains medieval stained-glass fragments in the north nave windows, as well as later 19th-century glass by Lavers, Barraud and Westlake.

Francis Blomefield's history of Norfolk records that the church was dedicated to St Nicholas and that Ashill had both a rector and a vicar in the medieval period before becoming a rectory before 1300. St Nicholas is part of the Ashill Group in Breckland deanery, within the Diocese of Norwich.
