= Caston =

Village and civil parish in Norfolk, England

Coordinates: 52.543°N 0.883°E

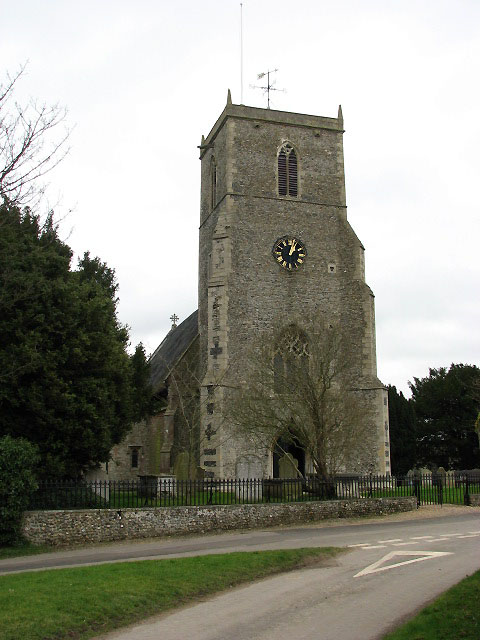
- Church of the Holy Cross

- Location within Norfolk
- Area: 6.37 km^{2} (2.46 sq mi)
- Population: 480 (2021)
  - Density: 75/km^{2} (190/sq mi)
- OS grid reference: TL955978
- Civil parish: Caston
- District: Breckland
- Shire county: Norfolk
- Region: East
- Country: England
- Sovereign state: United Kingdom
- Post town: ATTLEBOROUGH
- Postcode district: NR17
- Dialling code: 01953
- Police: Norfolk
- Fire: Norfolk
- Ambulance: East of England
- UK Parliament: Mid Norfolk

Caston is a village and civil parish in the English county of Norfolk. It is 3 miles (4.8 km) south-east of Watton, 5 miles (8.0 km) north-west of Attleborough, and 18 miles (29 km) west of Norwich.

At the 2021 census, the village had a population of 480, an increase from 443 at the 2011 census.

== History ==
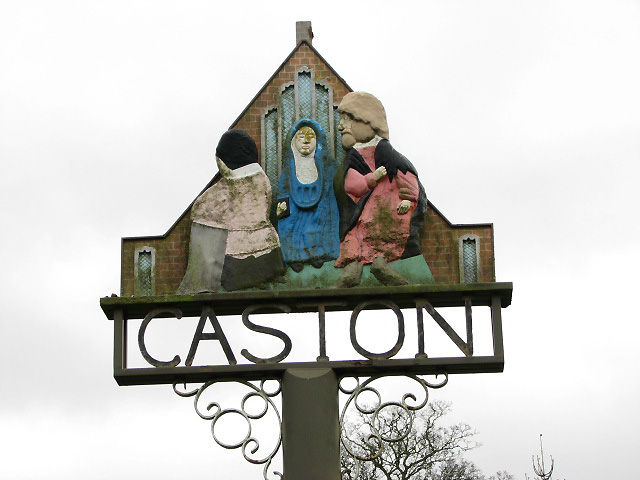
Village sign

Caston's name derives from the Old English for "Catt's enclosure", with Catt, referring to wild cats, probably being a nickname. In the Domesday Book the village is recorded as a settlement of 57 households in the hundred of Wayland; a church and a mill were recorded. It was divided between the estates of William the Conqueror and William de Warenne.

The three-tiered base of a medieval stone cross close to the church is the remains of a cross which is thought to have been a waypoint for pilgrims travelling to Walsingham Priory. The shaft was removed in the 19th century by which point it had become dangerous. The remains are a scheduled monument.

During the sixteenth century, Caston was the residence of Edward Gilman, who was one of the earliest recorded ancestors of Abraham Lincoln.

By 1848, the village had a population of 513. Caston Windmill was built in the nineteenth century for Edward Wyer. Today, the mill is in private ownership and is Grade II listed.

== Amenities ==
The Church of the Holy Cross dates from the 13th century, although an older church probably stood on the same site. The building has been Grade I listed since 1958. The church was heavily restored in 1850s and features several medieval stained-glass roundels which were re-set after damage during the Second World War. The church also has a grand candelabra, believed to have come which originally from Hampton Court Palace via Cheshunt in Hertfordshire.

Caston school is a voluntary aided primary school. It serves the village and surrounding area. After leaving primary school, children usually transfer to Wayland Academy in Watton.
