= Roudham =

Former civil parish in Norfolk, England

Coordinates: 52.447°N 0.876°E

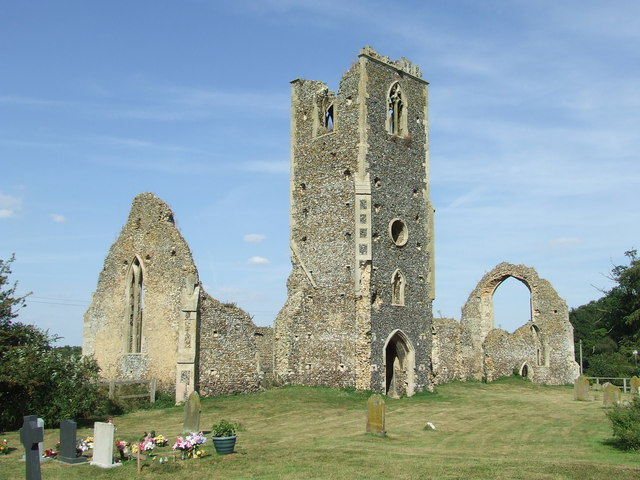
- St Andrew's Church, Roudham

- Location within Norfolk
- OS grid reference: TL955871
- Civil parish: Roudham and Larling
- District: Breckland
- Shire county: Norfolk
- Region: East
- Country: England
- Sovereign state: United Kingdom
- Post town: NORWICH
- Postcode district: NR16
- Dialling code: 01953
- UK Parliament: South West Norfolk

Roudham is a small settlement and former civil parish, now in the parish of Roudham and Larling, in the Breckland district of the county of Norfolk, England. It lies about 6 miles (10 km) north-east of Thetford, to the south of the A11 road towards Norwich.

There are remains of a medieval settlement. The Breckland line, opened in 1845, passes just north of Roudham. In 1869, when a branch was built northward to Swaffham, Roudham Junction railway station was opened about 2 miles (3 km) to the west. The branch and the station closed in 1964.

About a mile east of the settlement, next to Harling Road station, is an area of light industry. Among the businesses there is St George's Distillery, a producer of English single malt whisky.

The parish is centred round the ruinous remains of St Andrew's Church, abandoned in 1736 after a destructive fire. Although it stands to this day with all its walls at their original height, the structure of the building is weak. The church remains a significant monument in the landscape, although due to its weak condition, it has had to be cordoned off due to the danger of it collapsing.

== Civil parish ==
On 1 April 1935, the parish of Larling was merged with Roudham. On 14 August 2000, the new parish was renamed to "Roudham & Larling". In 1931 the parish of Roudham (prior to the merge) had a population of 151.
