= Wayland Wood =

Site of Special Scientific Interest near Watton, Norfolk, England

Coordinates: 52.560315°N 0.839050°E

- Site of Special Scientific Interest
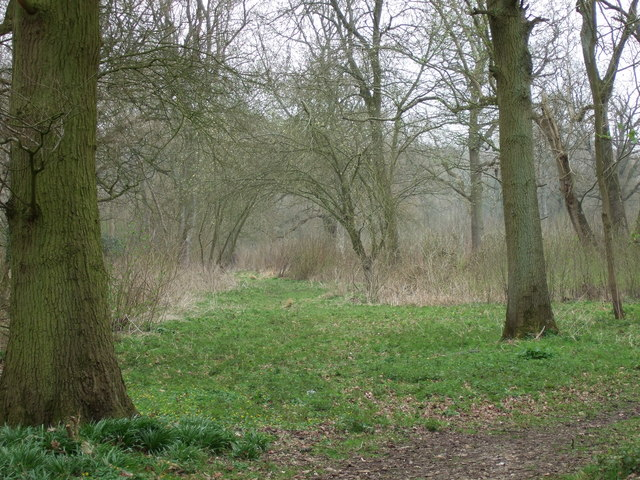
- Location of Wayland Wood.
- Area of search: Norfolk
- Grid reference: TL 925 996
- Interest: Biological
- Area: 31.7 hectares (78 acres)
- Notification date: 1983
- Location map: Magic Map

Wayland Wood is a 31.7-hectare (78-acre) biological Site of Special Scientific Interest near to Watton in Norfolk, England. It is a Nature Conservation Review site, Grade 2, and it is managed by the Norfolk Wildlife Trust.

== Habitat ==
The wood covers an area of 84 acres (34 hectares) and is located .6 mi (1 km) south of the town of Watton, Norfolk on the A1075 road to Thetford. It is a designated Site of Special Scientific Interest and features oak, ash, hazel and bird cherry trees, and is also the home to a golden pheasant population. The wood is also the only known location in Norfolk where the yellow star-of-Bethlehem grows.

== Babes in the Wood ==
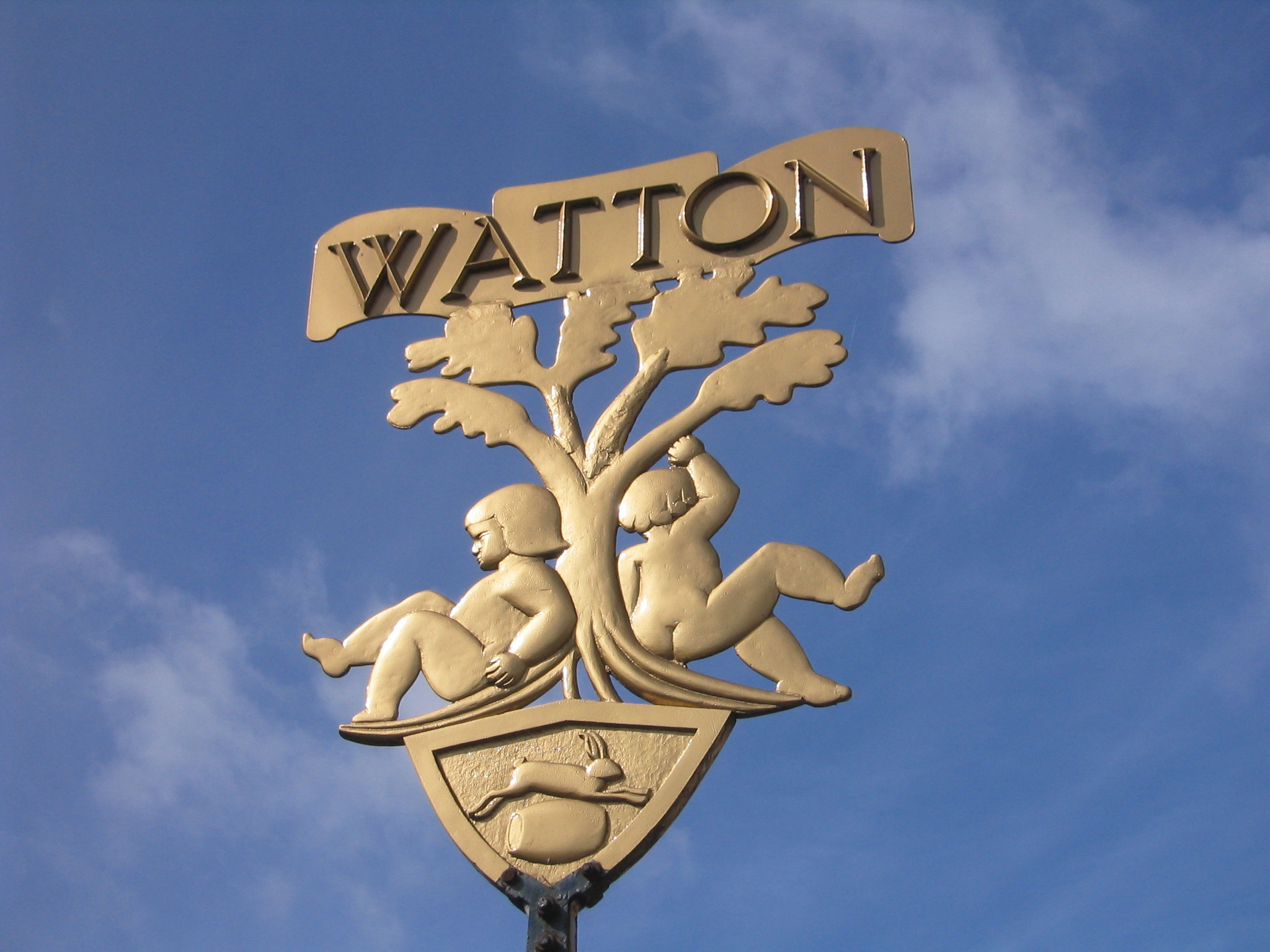
Watton Town Sign

Wayland Wood is also the setting of the centuries-old tale of Babes in the Wood, a brother and sister who were abandoned to die in the woodland. The legend tells that these two children were left in the care of their uncle at Griston Hall on the edge of the woods, following the death of their parents. On reaching maturity they were to inherit their father's fortune, but should they pass before this time the wealth would go directly to the uncle. The uncle abandons the two children to stake his claim to the wealth. Their ghosts supposedly haunt the forest. In 1879, the tree that the babes had reputedly been left under was struck by lightning. The strength of the legend had grown to such an extent that people visited the area for souvenirs.
