= Great Cressingham Fen =

Protected area in Norfolk, England

Coordinates: 52.586°N 0.725°E

- Site of Special Scientific Interest
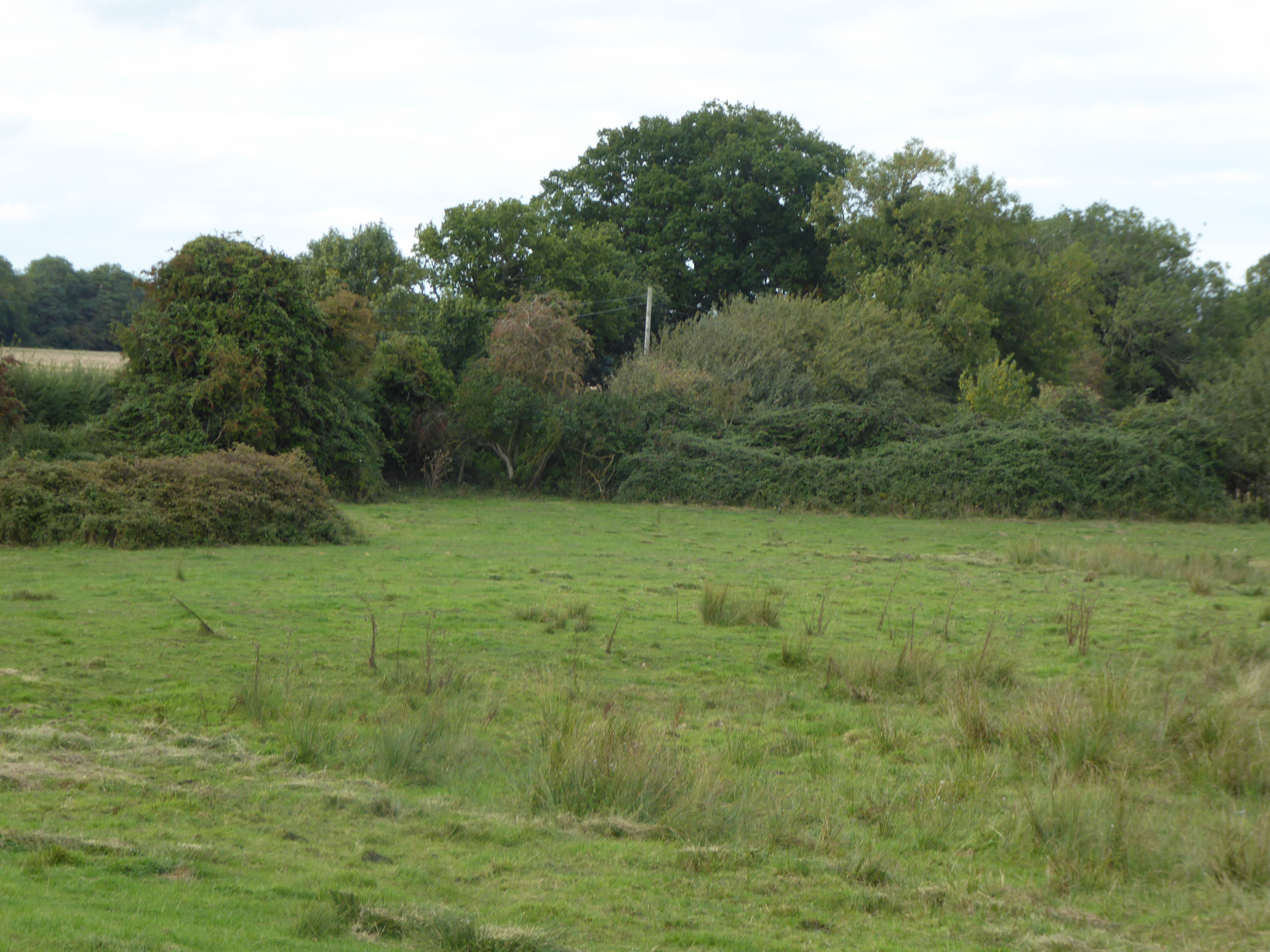
- Location of Great Cressingham Fen.
- Area of search: Norfolk
- Grid reference: TF 847 022
- Interest: Biological
- Area: 14.3 hectares (35 acres)
- Notification date: 1988
- Location map: Magic Map

Great Cressingham Fen is a 14.3-hectare (35-acre) biological Site of Special Scientific Interest near Great Cressingham in Norfolk, England. It is part of the Norfolk Valley Fens Special Area of Conservation.

This calcareous spring-fed valley has a variety of vegetation types, ranging from dry unimproved grassland on high slopes to tall fen where the springs emerge at the valley bottom. There is a diverse range of flora, including some uncommon species. Plants in the valley bottom include water mint and southern marsh orchid.

The site is private land with no public access.
