= Hooks Well Meadows, Great Cressingham =

UK Site of Special Scientific Interest

Coordinates: 52.577°N 0.710°E

- Site of Special Scientific Interest
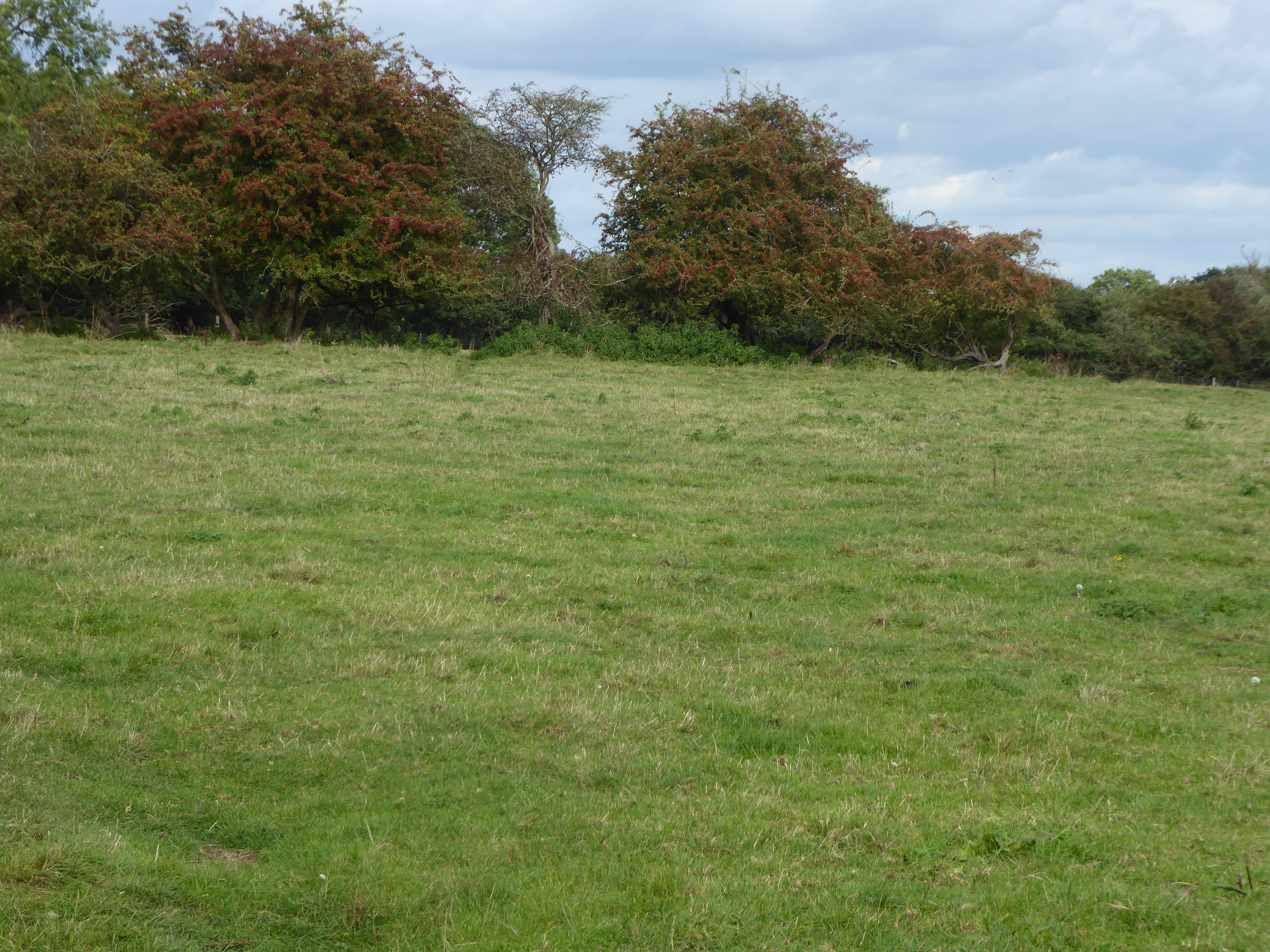
- Location of Hooks Well Meadows, Great Cressingham.
- Area of search: Norfolk
- Grid reference: TF 837 011
- Interest: Biological
- Area: 15.6 hectares (39 acres)
- Notification date: 1991
- Location map: Magic Map

Hooks Well Meadows, Great Cressingham is a 15.6-hectare (39-acre) biological Site of Special Scientific Interest near Great Cressingham in Norfolk, England.

This site has had a long history of traditional management. The diverse habitats include fen meadow, herb-rich wet grassland, acidic flushes, dry calcareous grassland and wet alder woodland, which has carpets of sphagnum mosses.

The site is a Ministry of Defence training area with no public access.
