= Wayland Hall =

Municipal building in Watton, Norfolk, England

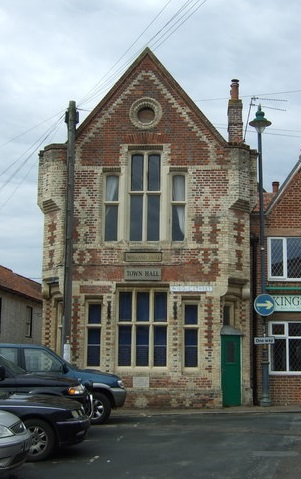
- Wayland Hall

- Shown in Norfolk
- 52.5718°N 0.8256°E
- Location: Middle Street, Watton

History
- Built: 1853

Site notes
- Architect: Edward Buckton Lamb
- Architectural style: Gothic Revival style

Listed Building – Grade II
- Official name: Wayland Hall
- Designated: 31 August 1983
- Reference no.: 1076779

Wayland Hall, also known as Watton Town Hall, is a community events venue in Middle Street, Watton, Norfolk, England: the structure, which also accommodates a local history museum, is a grade II listed building.

== History ==
In the mid-19th century, a group of local businessmen decided to form a company to raise funds for the erection of an events venue in the town: the site they selected was on the north side of what was then the Market Place. The foundation stone was laid by Lady Walsingham of Merton Hall on 26 April 1853. The building was designed by Edward Buckton Lamb in the Gothic Revival style, built in red and buff bricks with stone dressings and was completed later that year. The name chosen for the building, Wayland Hall, recalled the location of the town and its town hall within the ancient Wayland Hundred.

The design involved a symmetrical main frontage with a single bay facing onto the Market Place; there was a three-light casement window flanked by single-light windows on the ground floor, a two-light casement window flanked by shorter single-light windows on the first floor and a gable containing an oculus above. The corners were canted and featured bartizan-type structures on the first floor. Internally, the principal rooms were the reading room on the ground floor and the main hall, which featured a hammerbeam roof, on the first floor.

Petty session hearings were held in the building once a fortnight in the 19th century and one of the rooms was converted into a cinema so that silent films could be shown in 1933. During the Second World War, the US Eighth Air Force used the airfield at RAF Watton as an air depot and the United States Air Force subsequently presented a shield and an accompanying commemorative plaque to the town: these were later installed in the building. In the 1950s, a public library was established in the building and, following local government re-organisation in 1974, the new town council acquired the building, converted one of the rooms into a council chamber and also established its own offices in the building.

A programme of works, funded by the Heritage Lottery Fund, to convert two of the rooms in the building into a local history museum was completed in March 2018. A room on the ground floor became a research room and a room on the first floor was used as an exhibition area. Items in the collection include a model of a human skeleton, records relating to the manorial court of Watton Hall and memorabilia from RAF Watton. The memorabilia from RAF Watton had its origins in the Wartime Watton Museum which was established in the 1980s but closed when many of buildings on the airfield were demolished to make for the Blenheim Grange Housing Estate. The collection also includes an axe which is thought to be up to 600,000 years old.
