= Ovington, Norfolk =

Civil parish in Norfolk, England

Coordinates: 52.58621°N 0.84011°E

Ovington
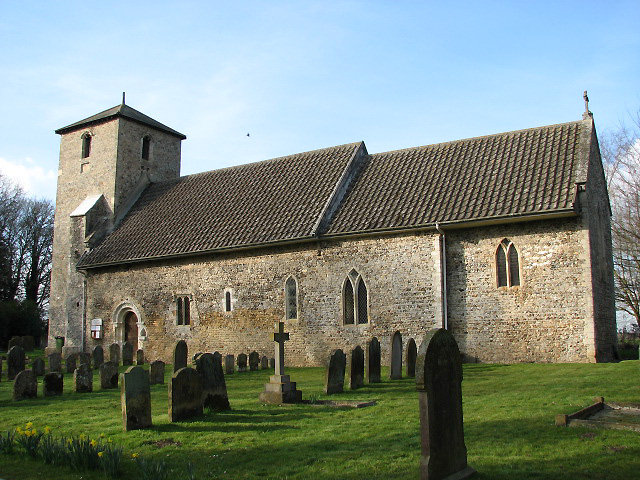
- John the Evangelist, Ovington

- Location within Norfolk
- Area: 6.44 km^{2} (2.49 sq mi)
- Population: 256 (2011)
  - Density: 40/km^{2} (100/sq mi)
- OS grid reference: TF925025
- Civil parish: Ovington
- District: Breckland
- Shire county: Norfolk
- Region: East
- Country: England
- Sovereign state: United Kingdom
- Post town: THETFORD
- Postcode district: IP25
- Dialling code: 01953
- Police: Norfolk
- Fire: Norfolk
- Ambulance: East of England

Ovington is a civil parish in the English county of Norfolk. It covers an area of 6.44 km^{2} (2.49 sq mi) and had a population of 239 in 92 households at the 2001 census, increasing to a population of 256 in 101 households at the 2011 Census. It is in the district of Breckland.

Ovington is represented by the Saham Toney ward of Breckland District Council and the Watton Division of Norfolk County Council.

== History ==
The village name means 'Farm/settlement connected with Ufa'. Ovington came under Saham at the time of the 1086 Domesday Book but by 1202 was established as a separate manor, held by Roger Bozun. It stayed in the Bozun family until the mid 16th century, and it latterly became the property of the University of Cambridge.

The Church of St John the Evangelist is a Grade II* listed building, dating from about 1300, and restored in 1867. The records of rectors start in 1304.

The former Crown public house and former Methodist Chapel are now private residences.

== Clubs ==
The long established ladies' group, gardener's and bowls clubs are active in Ovington. More recently an Allotment Association has been formed cultivating land behind the church.

== Fairs ==
Ovington holds a Christmas Bazaar in the Village Hall and a summer fete in the grounds surrounding the hall.
