= Saham Toney Windmill =

Windmill in Saham Toney, Norfolk, England

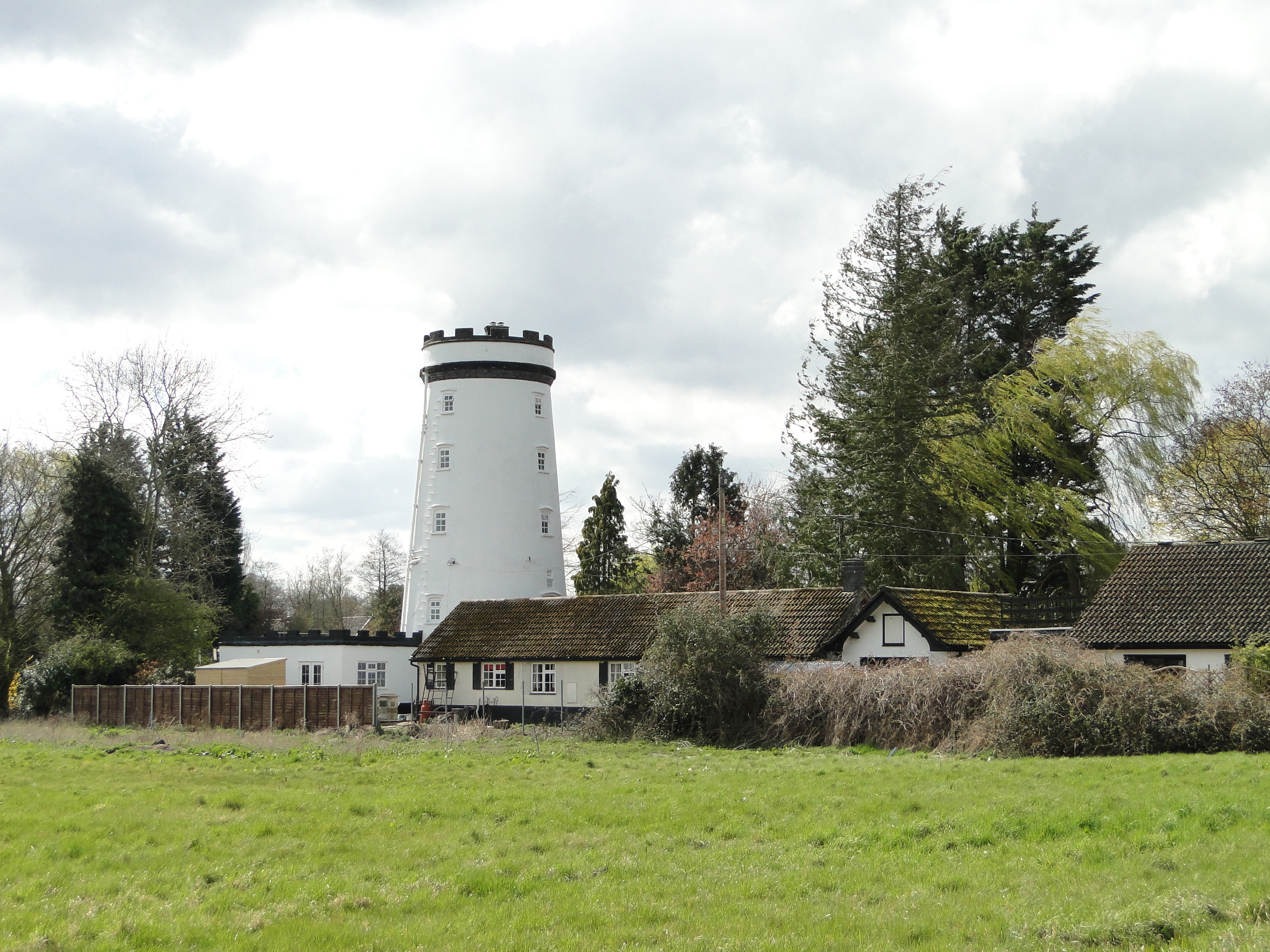
- Saham Toney Windmill, April 2019
- Interactive map of Saham Toney Windmill

Origin
- Mill name: Saham Toney Windmill
- Mill location: Saham Toney, Norfolk, United Kingdom
- Grid reference: TF 9081 0188
- Coordinates: 52°34′52″N 0°48′52″E
- Year built: 1828

Information
- Purpose: Corn mill
- Type: Tower mill
- Storeys: Six storeys
- No. of sails: Four
- Type of sails: Patent sails
- Windshaft: Cast iron
- Winding: Fantail
- Fantail blades: Eight
- No. of pairs of millstones: Two pairs

Saham Toney Windmill is a tower mill that was built in 1828. It worked until about 1904, then became derelict. It was converted to residential use in 1948, retaining some machinery.

== History ==
Saham Toney Windmill was built by John Bristow in 1824. He was still at the mill in 1842, but had retired by 1845. His son John Jr. took the mill, running it until c. 1880. The mill was taken by Robert Bristow. The mill had ceased working by 1904. Latterly, it had worked on only two sails.

The derelict mill still retained its cap and two sails in 1944. C.1948, it was dismantled by Smithdale's, millwrights of Acle, Norfolk. A bridge tree from Saham Toney was installed in Caston Windmill. In 1948, it was converted to residential use. In 1960, the tower was truncated by one storey. In 1981, an extension was added to the mill. C.1995, the mill was bought by pop singer Shakin' Stevens. It was advertised for sale in 2013 and again in 2015.

== Description ==
Saham Toney Windmill is a six-storey tower mill. The tower is about 50 feet (15 m) tall. It has a boat shape cap with a petticoat. Four double patent sails were carried on a cast iron windshaft. The mill was winded by and eight-bladed fantail. Two pairs of French Burr millstones were driven underdrift. The 8 feet 6 inches (2.59 m) diameter great spur wheel survives.
