= Thompson, Norfolk =

Village and civil parish in Norfolk, England

Coordinates: 52.533°N 0.835°E

Thompson
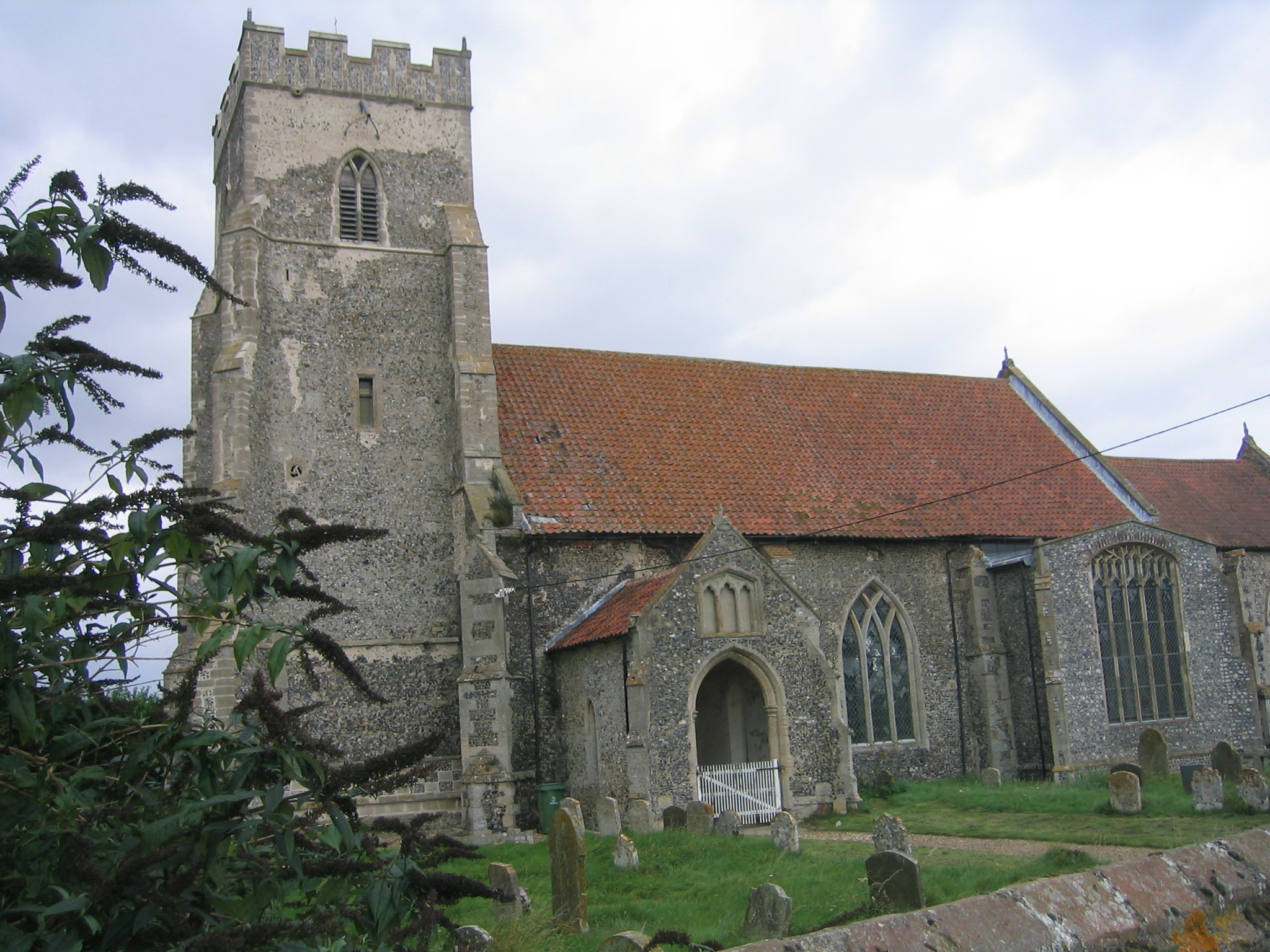
- St Martin's Church, Thompson

- Location within Norfolk
- Area: 9.20 km^{2} (3.55 sq mi)
- Population: 343 (2011 census)
  - Density: 37/km^{2} (96/sq mi)
- OS grid reference: TL923965
- Civil parish: Thompson, Norfolk
- District: Breckland
- Shire county: Norfolk
- Region: East
- Country: England
- Sovereign state: United Kingdom
- Post town: THETFORD
- Postcode district: IP24
- Dialling code: 01953
- Police: Norfolk
- Fire: Norfolk
- Ambulance: East of England
- Website: thompsonparish.gov.uk//

Thompson is a civil parish in the English county of Norfolk. It covers an area of 9.20 km^{2} (3.55 sq mi) and including Tottington had a population of 341 in 147 households at the 2001 census, increasing to 343 in 155 households at the 2011 Census. For the purposes of local government, the parish falls within the district of Breckland.

Thompson is a relatively secluded village, located amongst acres of woodland, with the nearest town being Watton.

In this region the name Thompson is believed to have Danish origins, as it was part of the Danelaw after centuries of invasion. The village is recorded in the Domesday Book of 1086 as Tomesteda and Tomestuna.
