= Roudham and Larling =

Civil parish in Norfolk, England

Coordinates: 52.45668°N 0.90874°E

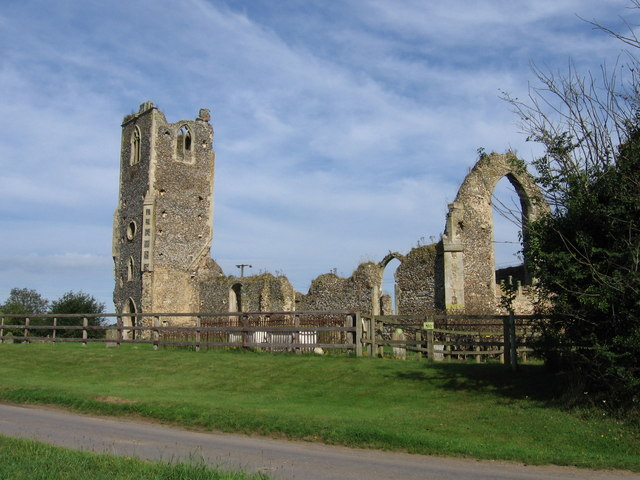
- Ruins of St Andrew's Church

- Location within Norfolk
- Area: 15.20 km^{2} (5.87 sq mi)
- Population: 301 (2001)
  - Density: 20/km^{2} (52/sq mi)
- OS grid reference: TL977882
  - London: 94.8 miles
- Civil parish: Roudham and Larling
- District: Breckland
- Shire county: Norfolk
- Region: East
- Country: England
- Sovereign state: United Kingdom
- Post town: NORWICH
- Postcode district: NR16
- Dialling code: 01953
- Police: Norfolk
- Fire: Norfolk
- Ambulance: East of England
- UK Parliament: South West Norfolk

Roudham and Larling is a civil parish in the English county of Norfolk. It includes the villages of Roudham and Larling. It covers an area of 15.20 km^{2} (5.87 sq mi) and had a population of 278 in 119 households at the 2001 census, increasing to a population of 301 in 119 households at the 2011 Census. For the purposes of local government, it falls within the district of Breckland. River Thet flows next to Roudham and Larling.

== History ==
The parish of Roudham and Larling is formed from the two ancient parishes which centred round the churches of St Andrew in Roudham and St Botolph in Larling. Up until 1894 all the duties usually performed by a local government were fulfilled by the churches, until the Local Government Act of 1984 which created civil parishes alongside ecclesiastical ones. The two parishes were known as separate ones for many years, when on 14 August 2000 at the request of Breckland council who declared a Notice of the Change of the Parish Name, making the civil parish now be more commonly known as Roudham and Larling.

The name Roudham has been thought to be derived from the old English meaning 'homestead where rue plants are grown.' A decline in population during the late Medieval period meant the village was abandoned and is now considered one of the best examples of a deserted Medieval settlement in Norfolk. After extensive archaeological research and the research into medieval findings it appears that the village of Roudham was thriving off the production of flint tools such as scrapers and arrowheads. For the early part the parish was a busy place, and judging by many barns and farmhouses it would have been heavily involved in agriculture. In the 19th century the Norfolk Railway opened which had a major impact on commuting into the area as well as the significant improvements in trade. The railway is still in use and has connections to the major towns and villages nearby.

The most recent archaeological findings date back to the First and Second World War. The Harling Road was used as one of the bases for fighter aircraft in First World War, and in the Second World War it was the base for the US army's 513th Ordnance Company, who maintained heavy armoured vehicles. The majority of the area is now used as a wasteland, with only a few buildings remaining after the War.

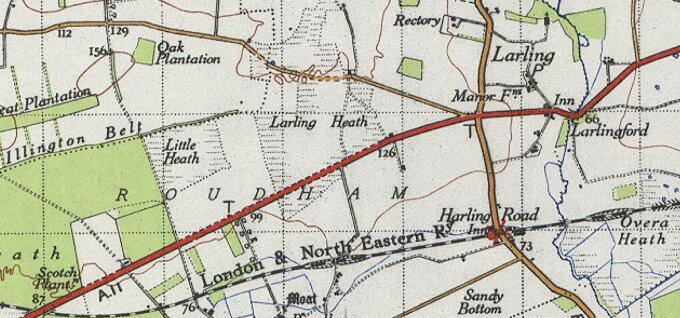
A 20th century map of Roudham and Larling

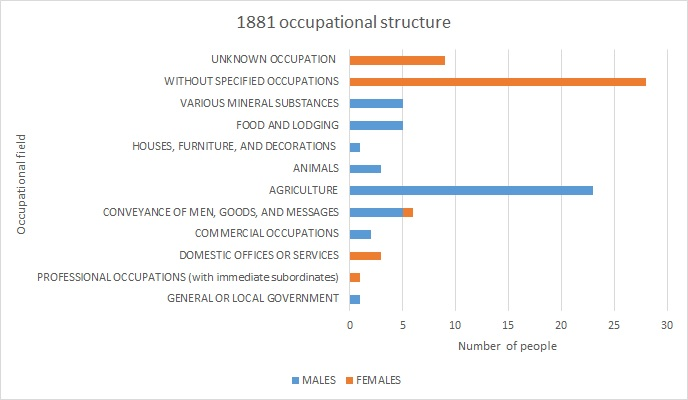
Occupational Structure of Roudham and Larling 1881

== Demography ==
In 1881, the main occupation of the parish was agriculture with 23% of men working within that sector, of the women, the most common occupations revolved around domestic services or offices with 3% of the women working within that sector. It does appear however that as much as 29% of women were without specified occupations, and it would appear that the men would be the main bread winners in households. The occupation structure of Roudham and Larling as of 2011 still remains highly orientated around agriculture and manual labour. The 2011 census shows that approximately 40% out of 180 in the age group of being economically active being employed in the Agricultural, Forestry and Fishing industry. The industry which shows to have increased and now employs the most residents is 'Wholesale and Retail Trade; Repair of Motor Vehicles and Motor Cycles' at 54% of the working population.

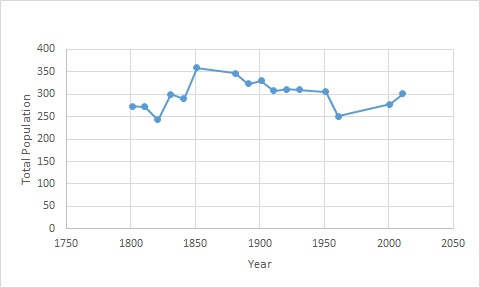
Total population from 1801–2011 from census data

The only prominent religion in Roudham and Larling is Christianity at approximately 66% of the population. The ethnic composition of the parish is dominated by 'White; English/Welsh/Scottish/Northern Irish/British' with 95.3% of a total population of 301 people falling into that group.

== Education ==
The parish does not have a local village school, but there are several schools in nearby villages such as; The New Eccles Hall School, Great Hockam Primary School, Eccles Hargham and Wilby CofE Primary School. The school in closest proximity to the civil parish is East Harling Primary School and Nursery. It is approximately 3 km away and is for ages 3–11. The latest reports from May 2015 show that 224 pupils attended the school in total, ranging from pre-school to year 6. The most recent report from November 2014, rated the school as 'Requiring Improvement.'

== Tourist Attractions ==
=== Ruins of St Andrew's Church ===
See Roudham

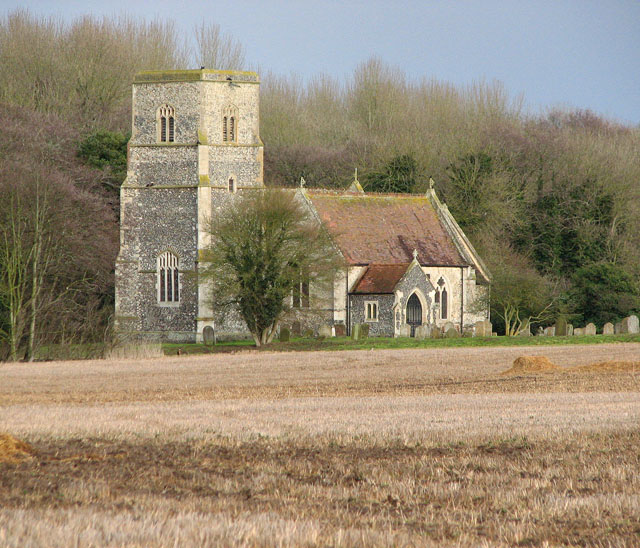
St Ethelbert's Church

=== St Ethelbert Church ===
See Larling#The Parish Church of Saint Ethelbert
