= Shaun Bailey (cricketer) =

English cricketer

Personal information
- Full name: Shaun Peter Bailey
- Born: 19 February 1990 (age 36); Norwich, Norfolk, England
- Nickname: Bud
- Batting: Right-handed
- Bowling: Right-arm fast-medium
- Role: Bowler

Domestic team information
- Years: Team
- 2007–2009: Norfolk
- 2008: Northamptonshire (squad no. 28)

Career statistics
| Competition | First-class |
|---|---|
| Matches | 1 |
| Runs scored | 18 |
| Batting average | 9 |
| 100s/50s | 0/0 |
| Top score | 15 |
| Balls bowled | 156 |
| Wickets | 3 |
| Bowling average | 42.33 |
| 5 wickets in innings | 0 |
| 10 wickets in match | 0 |
| Best bowling | 2/119 |
| Catches/stumpings | 1/- |
- Source: CricInfo, 20 May 2022

Shaun Peter Bailey (born 19 February 1990) is an English cricketer. He is a right-handed batsman and a right-arm medium-fast bowler who played for Northamptonshire.

Bailey was born at Norwich and made his cricketing debut in the East Anglian Premier Cricket League for Swardeston at the age of thirteen. He was educated at Hockham School and Wayland Community High School, first played for Northamptonshire's Second XI in the 2005 Second XI Championship. Following an appearance in the 2007 MCCA Trophy, Bailey made his only first-class appearance in 2008. After failing to break into the first team, he left Northamptonshire at the end of the 2009 season.
