= Weasenham St Peter =

Village in Norfolk, England

Coordinates: 52°45′58″N 0°44′51″E

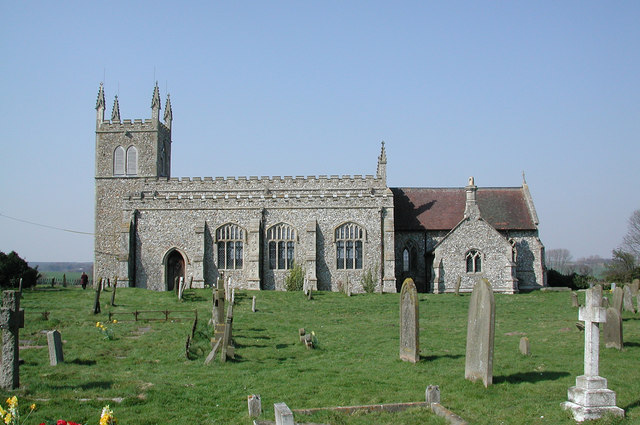
- St Peter's Church, Weasenham St Peter

- Location within Norfolk
- Area: 5.79 km^{2} (2.24 sq mi)
- Population: 169 (2011 census)
  - Density: 29/km^{2} (75/sq mi)
- OS grid reference: TF855222
- Civil parish: Weasenham St Peter
- District: Breckland
- Shire county: Norfolk
- Region: East
- Country: England
- Sovereign state: United Kingdom
- Post town: KING'S LYNN
- Postcode district: PE32
- Police: Norfolk
- Fire: Norfolk
- Ambulance: East of England

Weasenham St Peter is a village and civil parish in the English county of Norfolk. It covers an area of 5.79 km^{2} (2.24 sq mi) and had a population of 166 in 85 households at the 2001 census, increasing to a population of 169 in 86 households at the 2011 Census. For the purposes of local government, it falls within the district of Breckland.

The village's name means 'Weosa's homestead or village'.
