= Wellingham =

Village in Norfolk, England

Coordinates: 52.76597°N 0.77036°E

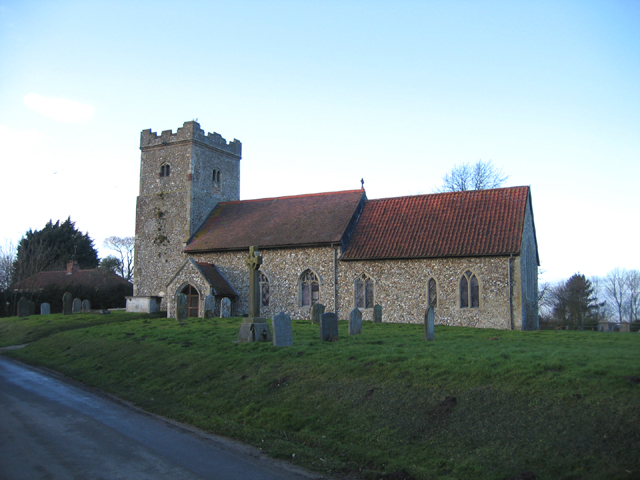
- St Andrew's Church, Wellingham

- Location within Norfolk
- Area: 4.39 km^{2} (1.69 sq mi)
- Population: (2001 census)
- OS grid reference: TF870223
- Civil parish: Wellingham
- District: Breckland
- Shire county: Norfolk
- Region: East
- Country: England
- Sovereign state: United Kingdom
- Post town: KING'S LYNN
- Postcode district: PE32
- Police: Norfolk
- Fire: Norfolk
- Ambulance: East of England

Wellingham is a village and civil parish in the English county of Norfolk. It covers an area of 4.39 km^{2} (1.69 sq mi) and had a population of 55 in 27 households at the 2001 census. At the 2011 Census the population remained less than 100 and was included in the civil parish of Weasenham All Saints. For the purposes of local government, it falls within the district of Breckland.

The villages name origin is uncertain, 'homestead/village at Welling (= spring/stream place)' or perhaps, 'homestead/village of the Wellingas (= dwellers at the spring/stream)'.
