= South Lopham =

Coordinates: 52.39254°N 1.00129°E

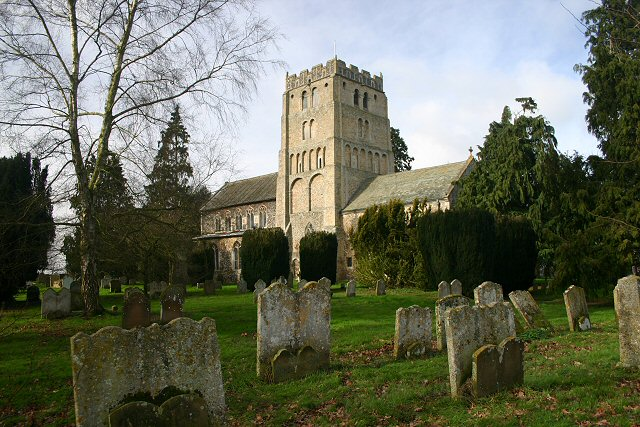
- St Andrew's Church, South Lopham

- Location within Norfolk
- Area: 7.91 km^{2} (3.05 sq mi)
- Population: 371 (2001 census)
  - Density: 47/km^{2} (120/sq mi)
- OS grid reference: TM043814
- Civil parish: South Lopham
- District: Breckland
- Shire county: Norfolk
- Region: East
- Country: England
- Sovereign state: United Kingdom
- Post town: DISS
- Postcode district: IP22
- Dialling code: 01379
- Website: https://south-lophampc.norfolkparishes.gov.uk/

South Lopham is a village and civil parish in the English county of Norfolk. It covers an area of 7.91 km^{2} (3.05 sq mi) and had a population of 371 in 157 households at the 2001 census. For the purposes of local government, it falls within the district of Breckland.

== History ==
In the 1950s evidence for occupation of the area dating back to Neolithic and Bronze Age times was found in the locality in the form of a Neolithic polished flint axe head and a quartzite stone axe hammer (Neolithic or Bronze Age).

The settlement is first recorded in the Domesday Book of 1086 as Lopham, held by Roger Bigod, later becoming known as Lopham Parva to mirror the existing village of Lopham Magna (now North Lopham), and then finally becoming known by its present name of South Lopham. The name Lopham originates from the Old English for 'Loppa's homestead'.

The manor house in the vicinity of the two Lophams was held by the Bigod lords until 1302 when the land was surrendered to the crown. In 1310 King Edward I in turn granted the manor to his brother Thomas of Brotherton who became Earl of Norfolk in 1313. The manor passed to Brotherton's daughter in 1375 who was subsequently created Countess of Norfolk in 1313. On her death in 1399 it passed to her grandson Thomas de Mowbray, first Duke of Norfolk, remaining with the Mowbrays until 1506 when it passed to the Howard family. It was eventually sold in 1872 to Henry Edwin Garrod of Diss.

From the earliest Domesday records the vicinity of the Lophams was noted as ploughland. Agriculture has continued to be the principle occupation in the area throughout its history including arable, cattle and sheep farming on the manorial land, common land, freeholdings and copyholdings.

There is evidence of linen production in the Lophams from 1400. The villages became famous for the quality of their linen in the 19th century before the decline of this cottage industry in favour of mechanised production.

When the Reverend Francis Blomefield wrote about the Lophams in 1739, he said that

This town is remarkable among the Country People for the three WONDERS, (as they call them) the First is, the Selfgrown Stile, being a tree grown in such a manner, and serves as such in a common Foot Path...the Second is the Ox-foot Stone, which lies in a meadow so called...The Third is called Lopham Ford, at the place the Ouse and Waveney have their rise...

=== Church of St Andrew ===
The church, originally dedicated to St Nicholas, is a Grade I listed building of rubblestone and flint with a central tower dating from c.1120. It retains evidence of earlier origin in the form of a high round window in the nave suggestive of a large Saxon church. The south aisle and chancel are 14th century and the south porch 15th century. The central Norman tower has Romanesque arcades on each side, and its position gives the church a cruciform layout, also in the nave is a chest dating from .c950 AD. The battlemented parapet was added in the 15th century. Restorations were carried out in 1866 and 1874.
