= HM Prison Wayland =

Men's prison near Griston, Norfolk, England

HMP Wayland
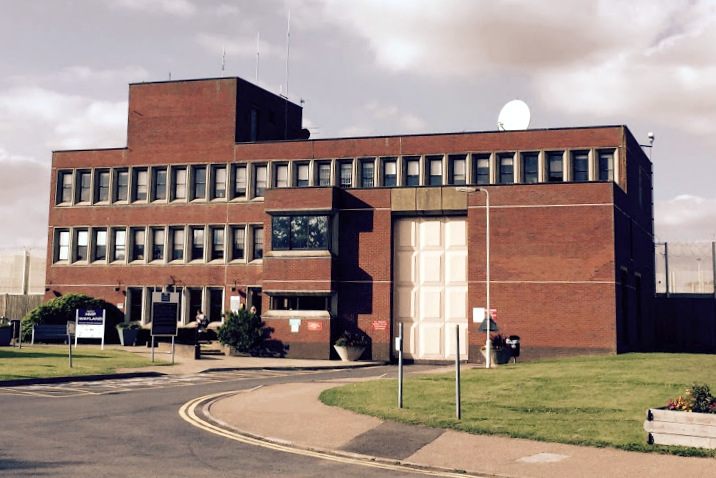
- Main Entrance to HMP Wayland

- Location in Norfolk
- Location: Griston, Norfolk; 52°33′14″N 0°51′29″E
- Security class: Adult Male/Category C
- Population: 1017 (December 2008)
- Opened: 1985
- Managed by: HM Prison Services
- Governor: Kevin Clark
- Website: Wayland at justice.gov.uk

HM Prison Wayland is a Category C men's prison, located near the village of Griston in Norfolk, England. The prison is operated by His Majesty's Prison Service.

== History ==
Wayland prison opened in 1985, and has been enlarged on three occasions. In 2007 the prison was enlarged again, when new pre-fabricated cells for up to 300 extra prisoners were moved into the Wayland Prison complex, as well as new workshops and other facilities.

In October 2007, a report from the Independent Monitoring Board claimed that prisoners at Wayland were being given inadequate mental health care by the NHS. The board criticised the Norfolk & Waveney Mental Health Trust for removing a specialist mental health nurse at the prison. However the report praised the jail's governor and prison staff for their preparations to open the new prison blocks at Wayland.

In November 2009, an inspection report from His Majesty's Chief Inspector of Prisons stated that an increased use of force was being used at Wayland Prison. Inspectors were also concerned that the healthcare department and reception facilities for new inmates were not adequate for the increased number of prisoners at the jail. However, the report described the prison as performing "reasonably well" overall.

In August 2016 the prison governor, Paul Cawkwell, was severely beaten by an inmate in the canteen.

An edition of BBC Radio 4 topical discussion programme Any Questions? was broadcast from the prison in September 1991, with the audience consisting of prisoners and prison officers.

== The prison today ==
Wayland is a Category C prison for adult males. It now comprises 14 residential units and one segregation unit. The majority of the accommodation at the prison is single cell with shared accommodation on the induction unit and in selected cells within the main wings.

The prison provides a range of workshops and training facilities as well as an education department which focuses on basic key skills. There is a visitors' centre offering refreshments and a play area for prisoners' children in the visits room. This is supervised and managed by the Ormiston Children and Families Trust.

== Notable (former) inmates ==
- Jerome Samuels participated in Gordon Ramsay behind bars show.
- Jeffrey Archer was an inmate from August until October 2001, as a result of his high-profile perjury conviction. His diary, from his time in the prison, is published in 'Prison Diary 2: Wayland - Purgatory'
- Charlie Gilmour, stepson of Pink Floyd guitarist, David Gilmour served 4 months at HMP Wayland in 2011.
- Khalid Masood, the perpetrator of the 2017 Westminster attack, spent two years at the prison.
- Reggie Kray
- Pete Doherty
- Patrick Mackay, a serial killer charged with the murders of three people. He served from June 2008 until November 2017.
