= Weasenham All Saints =

Civil parish in Norfolk, England

Coordinates: 52.7582°N 0.74036°E

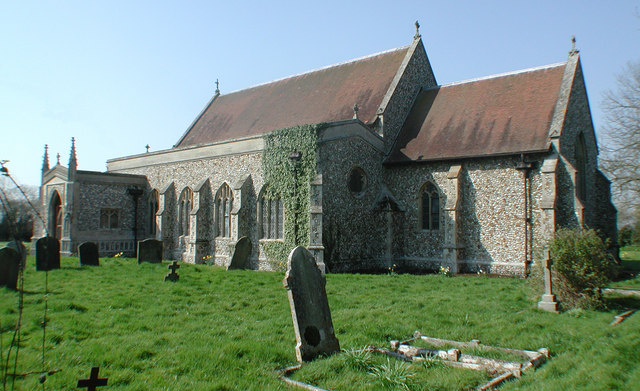
- All Saints’ Church, Weasenham All Saints

- Location within Norfolk
- Area: 8.16 km^{2} (3.15 sq mi)
- Population: 223 (2011 census)
  - Density: 27/km^{2} (70/sq mi)
- OS grid reference: TF850213
- Civil parish: Weasenham All Saints
- District: Breckland
- Shire county: Norfolk
- Region: East
- Country: England
- Sovereign state: United Kingdom
- Post town: KING'S LYNN
- Postcode district: PE32
- Police: Norfolk
- Fire: Norfolk
- Ambulance: East of England

Weasenham All Saints is a civil parish in the English county of Norfolk. It covers an area of 8.16 km^{2} (3.15 sq mi) and had a population of 178 in 76 households at the 2001 census, including Wellingham and increasing to a population of 223 in 87 households at the 2011 Census. For the purposes of local government, it falls within the district of Breckland.

The village's name means 'Weosa's homestead/village'.
