= Larling =

Village in Norfolk, England

Coordinates: 52.4695°N 0.916897°E

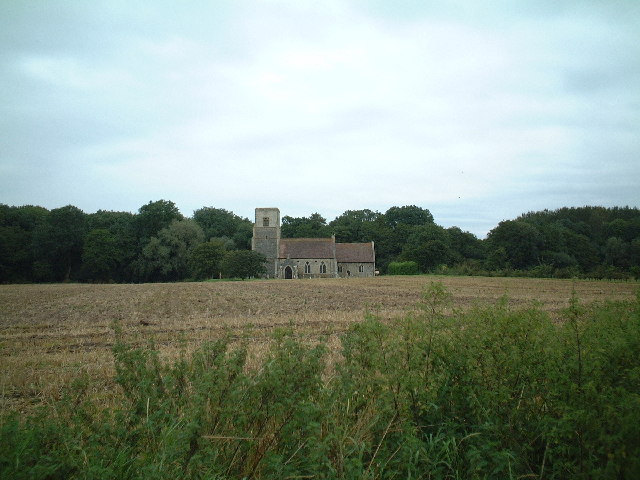
- St. Ethelbert's Church

- Location within Norfolk
- OS grid reference: TL9889
  - London: 94 miles (151 km)
- Civil parish: Roudham and Larling
- District: Breckland
- Shire county: Norfolk
- Region: East
- Country: England
- Sovereign state: United Kingdom
- Post town: NORWICH
- Postcode district: NR16
- Dialling code: 01953
- Police: Norfolk
- Fire: Norfolk
- Ambulance: East of England
- UK Parliament: South West Norfolk

Larling is a village and former civil parish, now in the parish of Roudham and Larling, in the Breckland district, in the English county of Norfolk.

Larling is located 8.5 miles (13.7 km) north-east of Thetford and 21.4 miles (34.4 km) south-west of Norwich.

== History ==
Larling's name is of Anglo-Saxon origin and derives from the Old English for Lyrel's people.

In the Domesday Book, Larling is listed as a settlement of 20 households in the hundred of Shropham. In 1086, the village was divided between the East Anglian estates of William de Warenne and Ulfkil.

In 1931 the parish had a population of 159. On 1 April 1935 the parish was abolished and merged with Roudham.

During the Second World War, an emergency runway was built on Larling Heath.

== St. Ethelbert's Church ==
Larling's former parish church is dedicated to Saint Ethelbert and dates from the Twelfth Century. St. Ethelbert's is located just off Sallow Lane and has been Grade I listed since 1958. The church holds Sunday service twice a month.

St. Ethelbert's holds an imposing Norman doorframe and was restored in the Victorian era which saw the installation of several stained-glass windows installed by Clayton and Bell.

== Shrubb Family ==
Shrubb family is one of the longest-running communal communities in England. Founded in 1970 in a 17th-century cottage near the old A11 and the Angel pub, the membership and fortunes of the community have fluctuated over the years, but the ethos of low-impact living and environmental harmony has persisted.

Shrubb is listed on the Diggers and Dreamers online directory, and there is a video of the early days at Shrubb on YouTube titled 'Shrubb Family 1973 part 1 & 2'. Shrubb is featured in "Communes in Britain" by Andrew Rigby, 1974. As of recent years the membership of the group has fluctuated and has been left with around 6 members.

== Governance ==
Larling is part of the electoral ward of Harling & Heathlands for local elections and is part of the district of Breckland.

The village's national constituency is South West Norfolk which has been represented by Labour's Terry Jermy MP since 2024.
