= Scoulton =

Village in Norfolk, England

Coordinates: 52.5657°N 0.9291°E

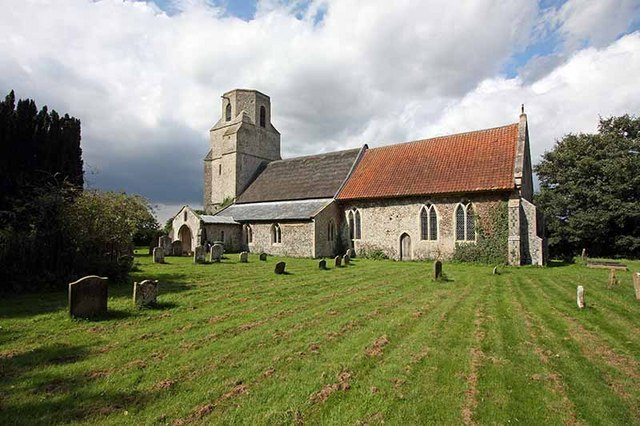
- Holy Trinity Church, Scoulton

- Location within Norfolk
- Area: 9.02 km^{2} (3.48 sq mi)
- Population: 246 (2011 Census)
  - Density: 27/km^{2} (70/sq mi)
- OS grid reference: TF9800
- District: Breckland
- Shire county: Norfolk
- Region: East
- Country: England
- Sovereign state: United Kingdom
- Post town: NORWICH
- Postcode district: NR9
- Dialling code: 01953
- Police: Norfolk
- Fire: Norfolk
- Ambulance: East of England

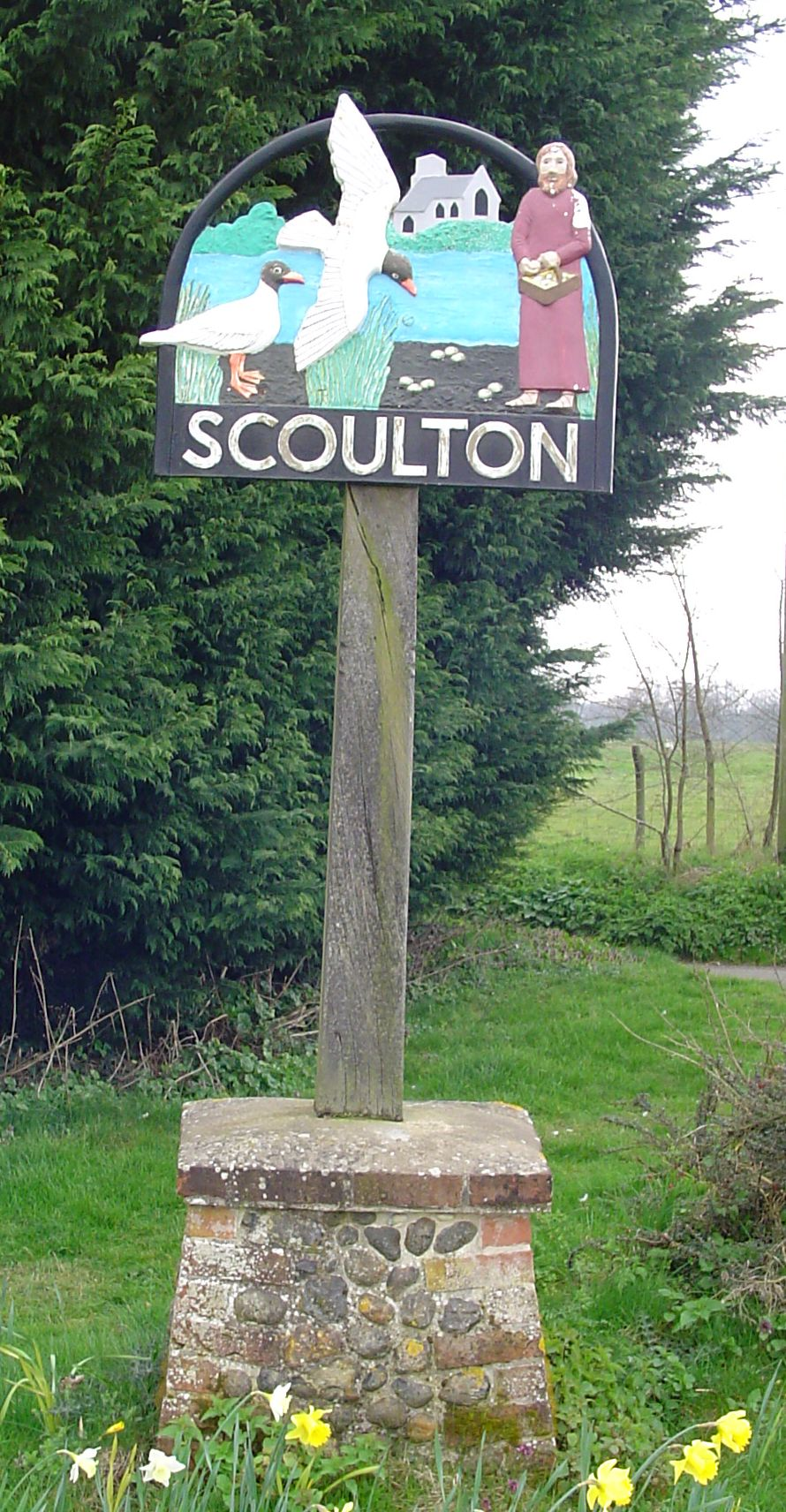
Signpost in Scoulton

Scoulton is a small village and civil parish in the county of Norfolk, England, situated 16 miles (26 km) west of the city of Norwich and 21 miles (34 km) north-north-east of Thetford.

The villages name means 'Skuli's farm/settlement'

Scoulton lies on the main road between Norwich and the market town of Watton. Increasingly a dormitory for workers in Norwich's insurance and other service industries, it was traditionally agricultural, relying particularly on the production of sugar beet and on pig farming. It has a fine, partially thatched Saxon church.

The civil parish has an area of 9.02 km^{2} (3.48 sq mi) and in 2011 had a population of 246 in 99 households. The population is split between two main areas of settlement and a number of small, isolated farms. For the purposes of local government, the parish falls within the district of Breckland.

Scoulton is known for its artificial and heavily wooded lake or "mere", which was the product of extensive flint quarrying and a breeding ground of the black-headed gull. Large numbers of eggs were harvested in the Middle Ages. The gull colony survived until at least the 1950s. The harvested eggs formed the basis of a now obsolete dish known as Scoulton Pie. The collection of these eggs is depicted on the village sign.

== Notes ==
http://kepn.nottingham.ac.uk/map/place/Norfolk/Scoulton
