= Wayland Academy, Watton =

Wayland Academy

Location
- Merton Road; Watton, Norfolk, IP25 6BA; England; 52°33′57″N 0°49′25″E

Information
- Type: Academy
- Trust: Inspiration Trust before 1 January 2020,Transforming Education in Norfolk (TEN)
- Department for Education URN: 137949 Tables
- Ofsted: Reports
- Principal: Lucy Austin
- Gender: Mixed
- Age: 11 to 16
- Enrolment: 556
- Houses: Carter (yellow), Chapman (green), Boudica (red) and Lincoln (blue)
- Website: www.inspirationtrust.org/wayland-academy

Wayland Academy (formerly Wayland Community High School) is a small mixed secondary school located in Watton in the English county of Norfolk. It is part of the Inspiration Trust, having been part of the Transforming Education in Norfolk Trust group of schools until January 2020.

== History ==
The school was converted to academy status in August 2012, and was previously a community school under the direct control of Norfolk County Council. The school continues to coordinate with Norfolk County Council for admissions.

== Academics ==
The schools offers GCSEs and BTECs as programmes of study, with some courses offered in conjunction with Easton & Otley College and City College Norwich.

== Notable former pupils ==
=== Wayland Community High School ===
- Shaun Bailey, cricketer
- Caroline Flack (1979-2020), television presenter
