= North Lopham =

Village in Norfolk, England

Coordinates: 52.40259°N 0.99139°E

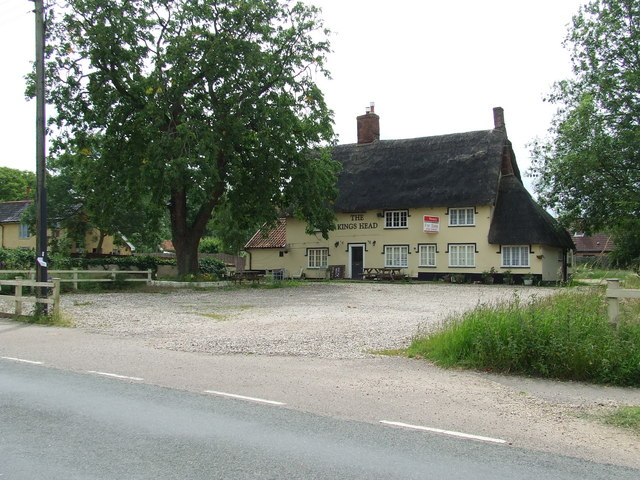
- The Kings Head Pub

- Location within Norfolk
- Area: 8.17 km^{2} (3.15 sq mi)
- Population: 623
  - Density: 76/km^{2} (200/sq mi)
- OS grid reference: TM035824
- Civil parish: North Lopham
- District: Breckland
- Shire county: Norfolk
- Region: East
- Country: England
- Sovereign state: United Kingdom
- Post town: DISS
- Postcode district: IP22
- Dialling code: 01379
- Police: Norfolk
- Fire: Norfolk
- Ambulance: East of England
- Website: http://www.northlopham.info/

North Lopham is a village and civil parish in the English county of Norfolk.

It covers an area of 8.17 km^{2} (3.15 sq mi) and had a population of 623 in 255 households at the 2011 census. For the purposes of local government, it falls within the district of Breckland. The church of St. Nicholas is situated within North Lopham, along Church Lane. St. Nicholas's church was described in 1870 as:

"The church was built by W. Bigod; has a Norman porch; exhibits, on the exterior and round the buttresses, many Latin inscriptions."

== History ==
North Lopham was first mentioned in the Little Domesday Book of 1086 and was referred to as 'Lopham Alia'. This Latin name can be translated into 'Another Lopham'. The name Lopham originates from the Old English for 'Loppa's homestead'. The earliest known building within the parish was a Roman villa located in the east of the village. This was discovered through Roman materials, such as pottery, and coins being found as a result of ploughing and metal detecting. During the 16th century, North Lopham was noted for the production of fine linen, as was common in the areas surrounding Thetford and Diss at the time. This production continued through the 17th and 18th centuries as was described by William White's 1845 Gazetteer:

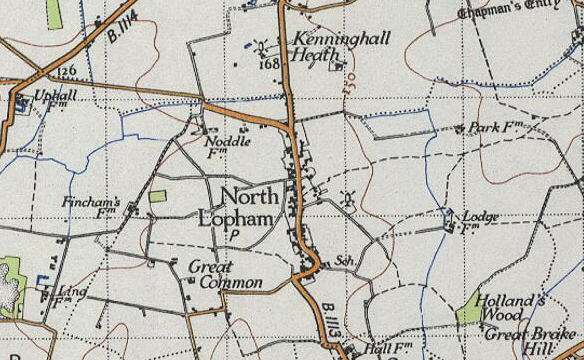
A 20th-century map of North Lopham, Breckland.

"the two villages have long been famous for the manufacture of linen or hempen cloth"

Yet, this successful industry faced competition from high volume machinery located in 'textile towns'. As a result, North Lopham's last production of linen was in 1910. In 1831, the parish had a population of 807 and contained a total of 121 houses. Within North Lopham, there are a total of seventeen properties which are on the National Heritage List including the grade one listed St. Nicholas's church and the grade two listed Wesleyen Chapel. In 1834, North Lopham became part of the Guiltcross Union which consisted of a total of eleven workhouses within Wayland, Thetford and Depwade. A work house was erected in North Lopham in 1836. In 1881, the main industry of the parish was agriculture, with 29% of the population of 674 working within this sector. Census data for the parish dates back to 1801, with the earliest figure for population being 588. The population decreased from 832 in 1851 to 461 in 1961.The population was at its lowest in parish history in 1961. The overall trend for the parish population is a gradual decrease until 1961, followed by an increase to 668 in 2019.

== Demography ==
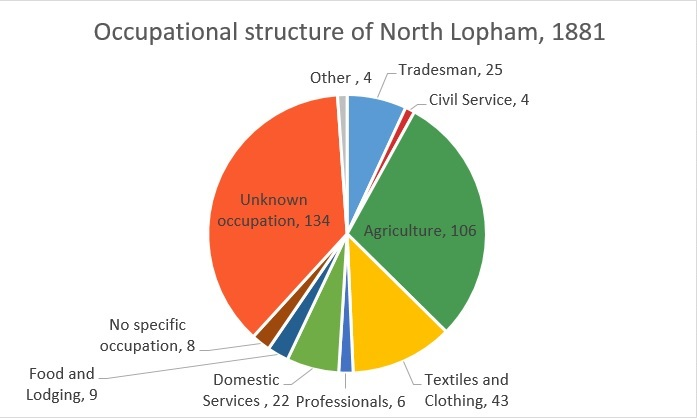
The Occupational Structure of North Lopham as shown by the Census of Population of 1881.

The occupational structure of North Lopham as of 2011 has seen reductions in the percentage of individuals working within the agricultural sector: only three percent of 623 people. The 2011 census shows that the industrial sector which employs the most residents of North Lopham is: 'Wholesale and Retail Trade; Repair of Motor Vehicles and Motor Cycles'. This industry employs eight percent of the population of the parish (16% of the working population).

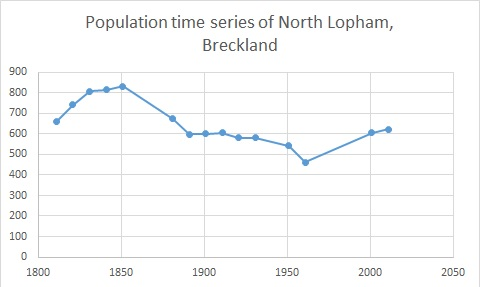
The total population of the North Lopham Civil Parish, Breckland, using the Census Population data from the years 1811–2011.

Few religions exist within North Lopham in 2011, the most common being Christianity, at 66% of the population. Ethnic composition within the parish is dominated by the group 'White; English/Welsh/Scottish/Northern Irish/British' with 97.6% of the population of 623 falling within the group. The next ethnic group with the greatest percentage is 'White; Other white' which accounts for 1.32% of the population.

== Education ==
St. Andrew's Lopham CE VA Primary School in North Lopham is named after the patron saint of Scotland, St. Andrew. It is located on The Street and is for ages 4–11. As of May 2015, 65 students attended the school across seven year groups. The most recent Ofsted report, 25 October 2012, for the primary school put its overall rating at 'Good'. North Lopham does not have a library; instead Norfolk County Council provide the parish with a mobile library service which stops at five different locations on the route CEN445, which continues on to South Lopham. The mobile library visits North Lopham every four weeks.

== Landmarks ==
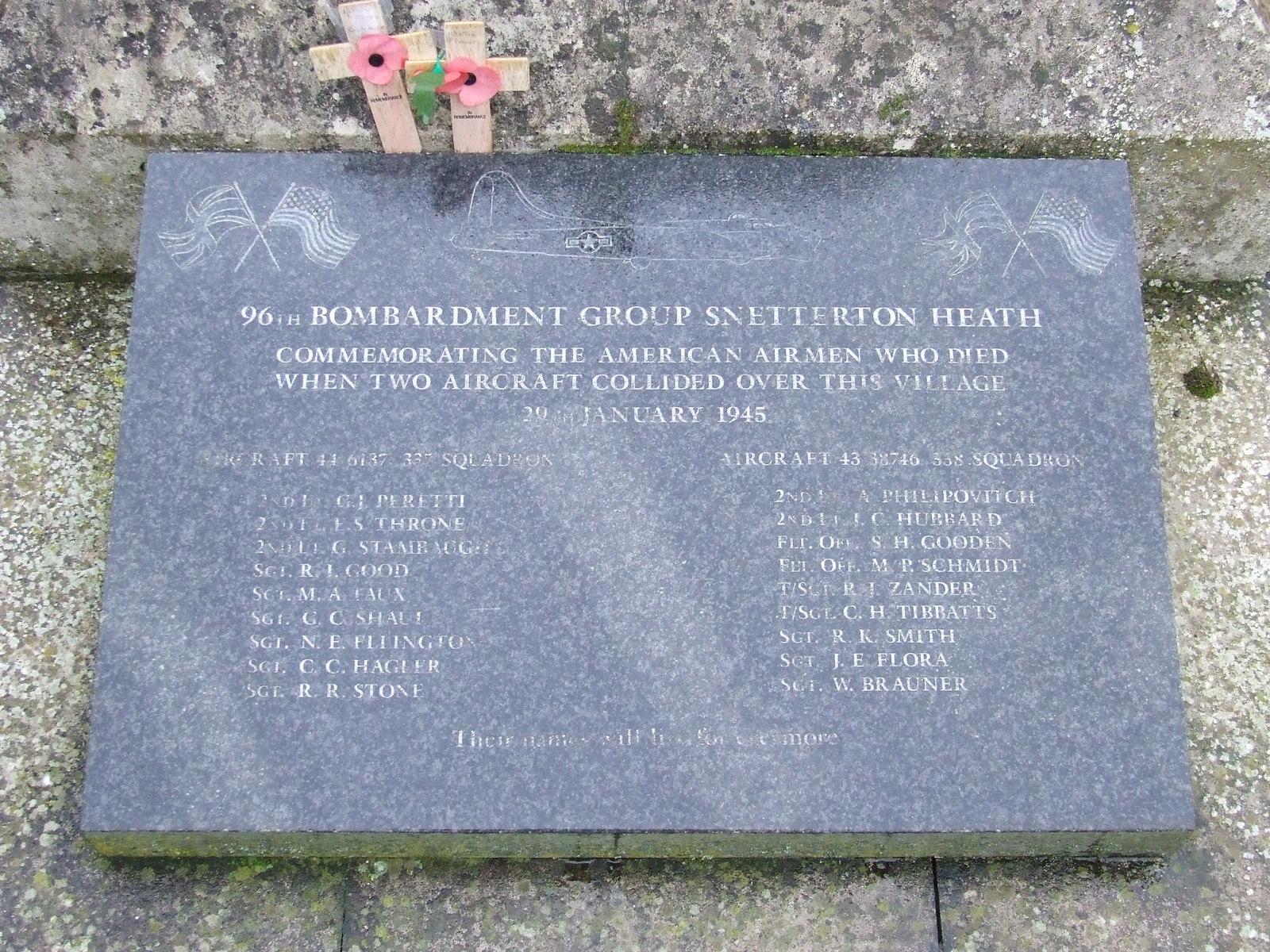
Memorial to Air Crash – geograph.org.uk – 1702081

=== Memorial to American air crash ===
On 29 January 1945, 18 American servicemen died when two aircraft collided over the village. The airmen belonged to the 96th bombardment group which was based in Snetterton, Norfolk, during the Second World War. A memorial, designed by Richard Vere, now stands in North Lopham to commemorate the incident.

=== War Memorial ===
Located along The Street, the stone obelisk stands to commemorate those who fought in the First World War (1914–1918) and the Second World War (1939–1945). The base of the memorial contains the names of the 38 men and an inscription which reads: "In Memory of the Men of North Lopham who gave their lives for their Country 1914–1919. There's some corner of a foreign field that is forever England. In memory of the Men of North Lopham who gave their lives for their country in the World War 1939–1945. Greater love hath no man than this."

=== Church of St. Nicholas ===
This church, constructed in the Middle Ages, consists of a 14th-century nave with the south isle and porch being constructed in the middle of the 14th century. The west tower was constructed in three stages and was completed in 1526. During the 19th century, alterations were made to the structure including all the roofs and the north vestry. The church is a grade one listed building under the Planning Act (Listed Buildings and Conservation Areas) of 1990 and was first listed in July 1958. The church is constructed of partly rendered flint and has a plain tiled roof.
