= Griston =

Village in Norfolk, England

Coordinates: 52.558°N 0.8665°E

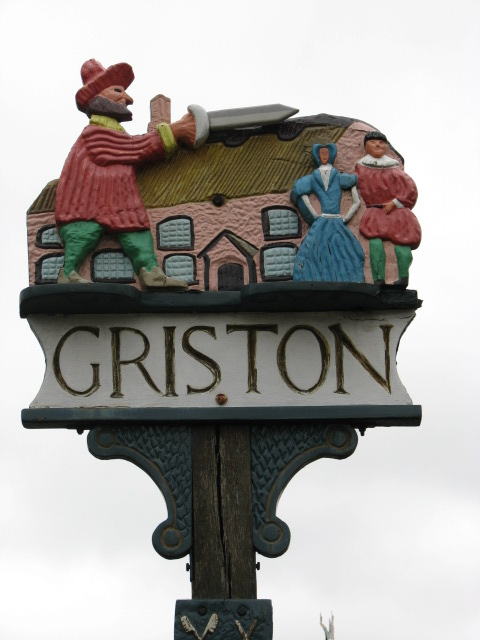
- Griston village sign

- Location within Norfolk
- Area: 2.17 sq mi (5.6 km^{2})
- Population: 1,816 (2021 census)
  - Density: 837/sq mi (323/km^{2})
- OS grid reference: TL944994
- Civil parish: Griston
- District: Breckland
- Shire county: Norfolk
- Region: East
- Country: England
- Sovereign state: United Kingdom
- Post town: THETFORD
- Postcode district: IP25
- Dialling code: 01953
- Police: Norfolk
- Fire: Norfolk
- Ambulance: East of England
- UK Parliament: Mid Norfolk

Griston is a village and civil parish in the English county of Norfolk.

Griston is located 1.9 miles (3.1 km) south-east of Watton and 19 miles (31 km) west of Norwich.

== History ==
Griston's name is of Viking origin and derives from the Old Norse for either Griss' farm or settlement or young pig farm or settlement.

In the Domesday Book, Griston is listed as a settlement of 29 households in the hundred of Wayland. In 1086, the village was part of the East Anglian estates of King William I, William de Warenne, Roger Bigod, Ralph Baynard and John, nephew of Waleran.

Griston Hall was built in the Sixteenth Century and by the Nineteenth Century had been converted into several separate dwellings. Griston Hall and nearby Wayland Woods are the setting for the story of the 'Babes in the Woods' stories where a malicious uncle sent two children into the woods to die so he could steal their inheritance. It is rumoured that the cries of the children can still be heard in the woods today.

During the Second World War, parts of the parish made up RAF Watton which was used by both the United States Army Air Force and Royal Air Force.

== Geography ==
According to the 2021 census, Griston has a population of 1,816 people which shows an increase from the 1,540 people recorded in the 2011 census.

== Church of St Peter and St Paul ==
Griston's parish church is dedicated to Saint Peter and Saint Paul and dates from the Fifteenth Century. The church is located within the village on Church Road and has been Grade I listed since 1983. St. Peter & St. Paul's is no longer for Sunday services.

The church was restored in the Victorian era by John Bond Pearce but still features medieval stone angels and stained-glass windows. The church also features an American flag which was gifted by the servicemen serving at RAF Watton who used the churchtower as a landmark when returning home.

== Amenities ==
Within the village there is a home for the elderly called Thorp House and the Category C HM Prison Wayland.

The Waggon & Horses pub has stood in the village since 1836. The pub remains open.

== Watton and Griston Link ==
As part of the Sustrans Connect2 project proposals are in place to create a cycling and walking route between Griston and the market town of Watton. The new route would follow the boundary of the Watton airfield and provide a shorter, traffic free alternative to the A1075. Norfolk County Council have allocated a £40,000 contribution towards funding of the scheme. A schematic map of the scheme has been published online.

== Governance ==
Griston is part of the electoral ward of All Saints & Wayland for local elections and is part of the district of Breckland.

The village's national constituency is Mid Norfolk which has been represented by the Conservative's George Freeman MP since 2010.

== War Memorial ==
Griston's war memorial is a marble plaque inside the Church of St. Peter & St. Paul which lists the following names in the First World War:

Rank	Name	Unit	Date of death	Burial/Commemoration
Cpl.	John Knights	4th Bn., East Lancashire Regiment	10 Aug. 1915	Helles Memorial
Pte.	Walter Alderton	1st Bn., Essex Regiment	16 Jun. 1917	Südfriedhof
Pte.	William A. Coe	1st Bn., Norfolk Regiment	14 Sep. 1914	La Ferté Memorial
Pte.	Walter Quadling	1st Bn., Norfolk Regt.	4 Nov. 1917	Tyne Cot
Pte.	Clement Crisp	11th Bn., Suffolk Regiment	3 Apr. 1917	Saint Nicolas Cemetery
Pte.	John W. Vout	13th Bn., Yorkshire Regiment	30 Apr. 1917	Fifteen Ravine Cemetery
Pte.	E. George Brett	Yorkshire Regiment	21 Nov. 1916	Griston Churchyard

The following names were added after the Second World War:

Rank	Name	Unit	Date of death	Burial/Commemoration
LCpl.	George E. Bunn	2nd Bn., Royal Norfolk Regiment	27 May 1940	Dunkirk Memorial
Pte.	Frederick J. Newby	6th Bn., Royal Norfolks	8 Jan. 1944	Chungkai War Cemetery
