= Breckland District =

Coordinates: 52°38′N 0°59′E

- Non-metropolitan district
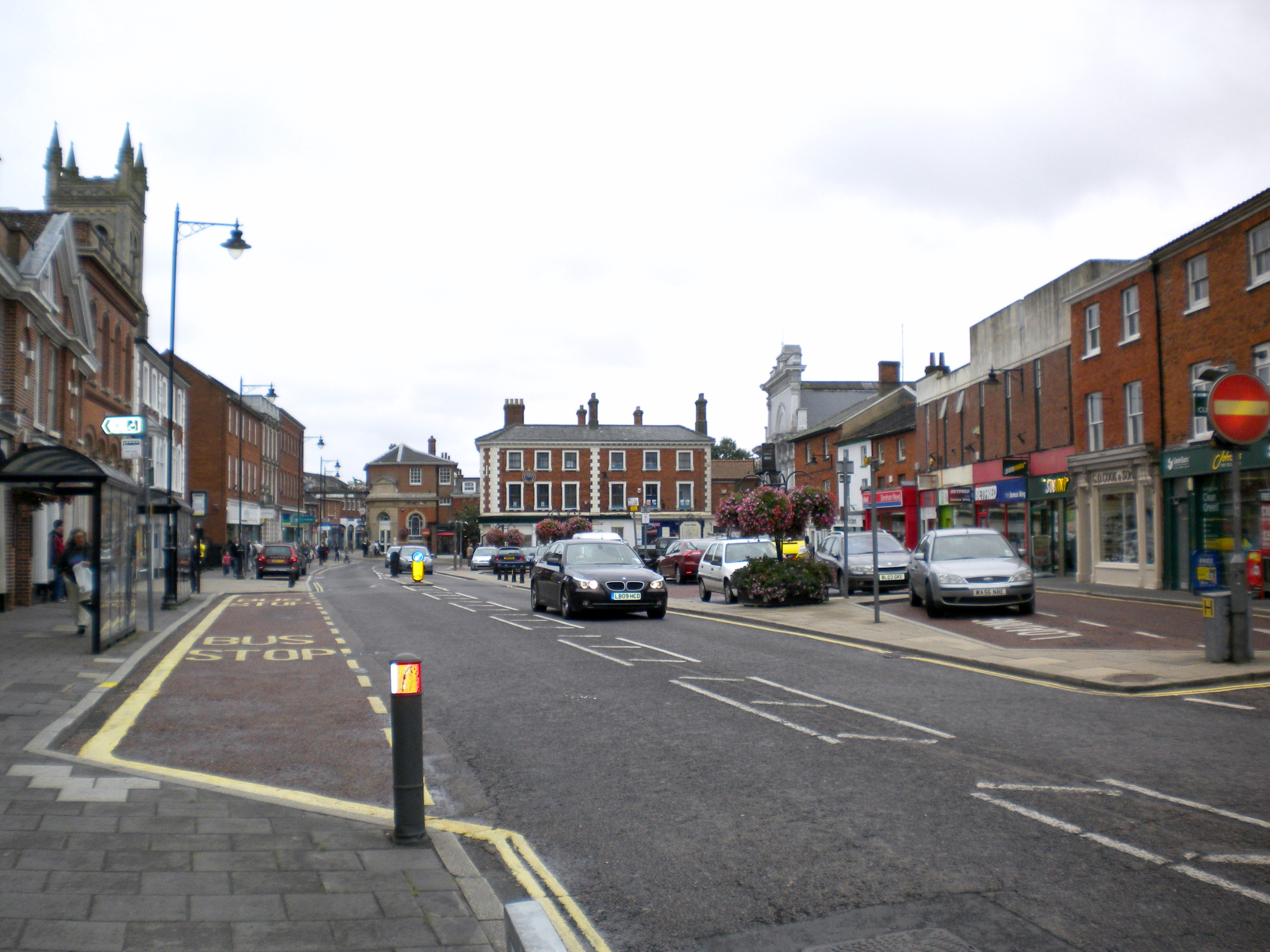
- Dereham, the administrative centre of the district and the second-largest settlement in the district

- Breckland shown within Norfolk
- Sovereign state: United Kingdom
- Constituent country: England
- Region: East of England
- Non-metropolitan county: Norfolk
- Status: Non-metropolitan district
- Admin HQ: Dereham
- Incorporated: 1 April 1974

Government
  - Type: Non-metropolitan district council
  - Body: Breckland District Council
  - MPs: George Freeman; Terry Jermy

Area
  - Total: 503.9 sq mi (1,305.1 km^{2})
  - Rank: 17th (of 296)

Population (2024)
  - Total: 146,620
  - Rank: 157th (of 296)
  - Density: 290.97/sq mi (112.34/km^{2})

Ethnicity (2021)
  - Ethnic groups: List: 96.5% White; 1.4% Mixed; 0.9% Asian; 0.6% Black; 0.6% other

Religion (2021)
  - Religion: List: 50% Christianity; 42.1% no religion; 7.4% other; 0.5% Islam
- Time zone: UTC0 (GMT)
  - Summer (DST): UTC+1 (BST)
- ONS code: 33UB (ONS); E07000143 (GSS)
- OS grid reference: TG018081

Breckland is a local government district in Norfolk, England. Its council is based in Dereham, although the largest town is Thetford. The district also includes the towns of Attleborough, Swaffham and Watton, along with numerous villages and surrounding rural areas.

The district derives its name from the Breckland landscape region, a gorse-covered sandy heath of south Norfolk and north Suffolk. The term "Breckland" dates back to at least the 13th century.

The neighbouring districts are King's Lynn and West Norfolk, North Norfolk, Broadland, South Norfolk, Mid Suffolk and West Suffolk.

== History ==
The district was created on 1 April 1974 under the Local Government Act 1972, covering six former districts which were all abolished at the same time:

- East Dereham Urban District
- Mitford and Launditch Rural District
- Swaffham Rural District
- Swaffham Urban District
- Thetford Municipal Borough
- Wayland Rural District

The new district was named Breckland after the distinctive landscape which covers parts of the area. The name was chosen following a competition organised by the outgoing authorities which invited local schools, organisations and individuals to put forward suggested names.

In March 2026, the government announced plans to abolish the district in 2028 as part of local government reorganisation across Norfolk. These proposals were withdrawn in September 2026.

== Governance ==
Breckland Council

Type
- Type: Non-metropolitan district

Leadership
- Chair: Nigel Wilkin, Conservative since 21 May 2026
- Leader: Sam Chapman-Allen, Conservative since 16 May 2019
- Chief Executive: Maxine O'Mahony since 2021

Structure
- Seats: 49 councillors
- Political groups: Administration (29) Conservative (29) Other parties (20) Labour (9) Reform UK (5) Green (1) Independent (5)

Elections
- Last election: 4 May 2023

Meeting place
- Elizabeth House, Walpole Loke, Dereham, NR19 1EE

Website
- www.breckland.gov.uk

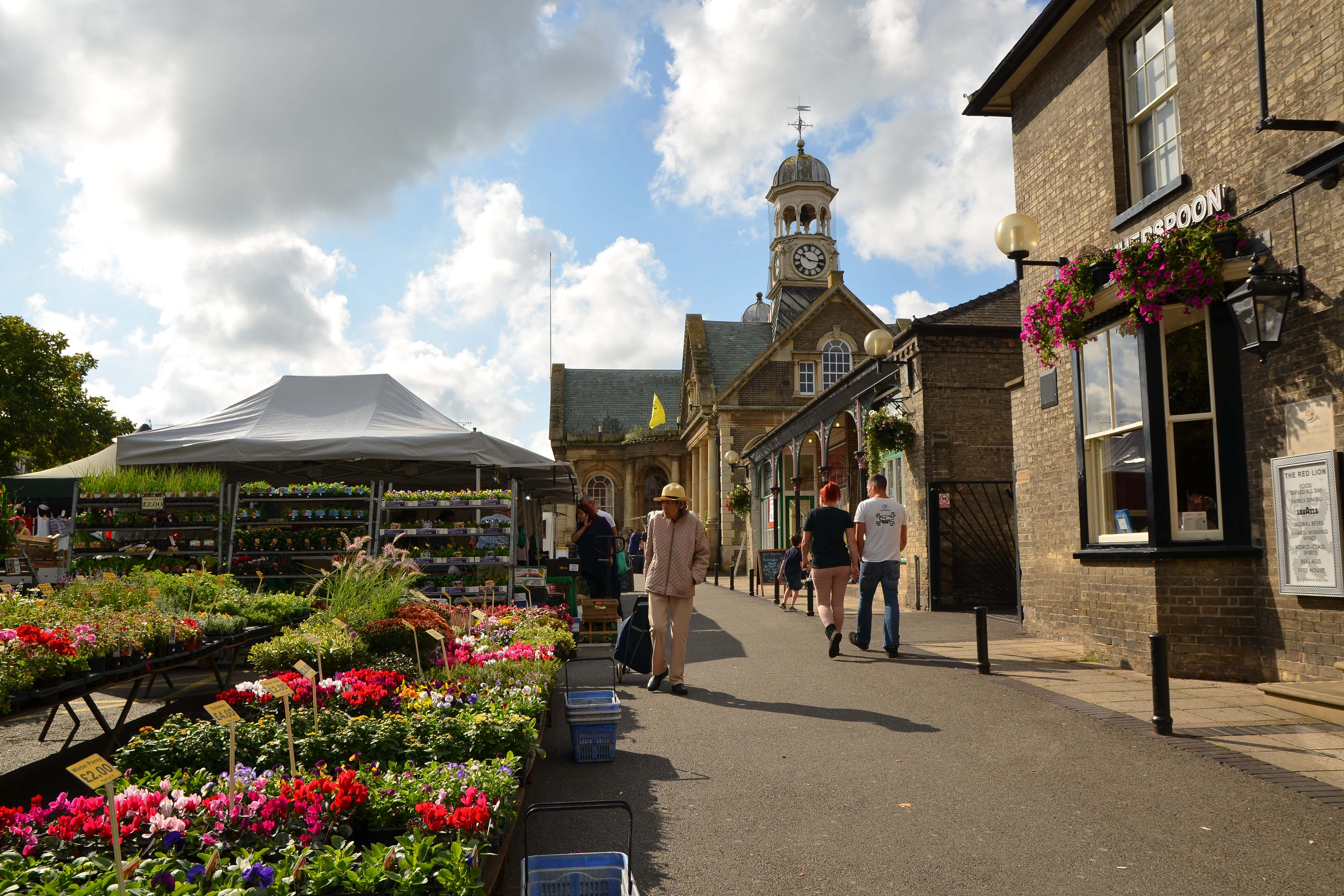
Thetford is the largest settlement in the district

Breckland District Council, which styles itself "Breckland Council", provides district-level services. County-level services are provided by Norfolk County Council. The whole district is also covered by civil parishes, which form a third tier of local government.

=== Political control ===
The council has been under Conservative majority control since 1999.

The first election to the council was held in 1973, initially operating as a shadow authority alongside the outgoing authorities until the new arrangements took effect on 1 April 1974. Political control of the council since 1974 has been as follows:

Party in control	Years
No overall control	1974–1979
Conservative	1979–1995
No overall control	1995–1999
Conservative	1999–present

=== Leadership ===
The leaders of the council since 1998 have been:

Councillor	Party	From	To
Cliff Jordan	Conservative	1998	2005
William Nunn	Conservative	2005	5 Sep 2013
Michael Wassell	Conservative	11 Sep 2013	31 Mar 2016
William Nunn	Conservative	31 Mar 2016	16 May 2019
Sam Chapman-Allen	Conservative	16 May 2019	

=== Composition ===
Following the 2023 election, and subsequent by-elections and changes of allegiance up to July 2026, the composition of the council was:

Party	Councillors
Conservative	29
Labour	9
Reform	5
Green	1
Independent	5
Total	49

Three of the independent councillors sit with the Green councillor as the "Independent and Green Group".

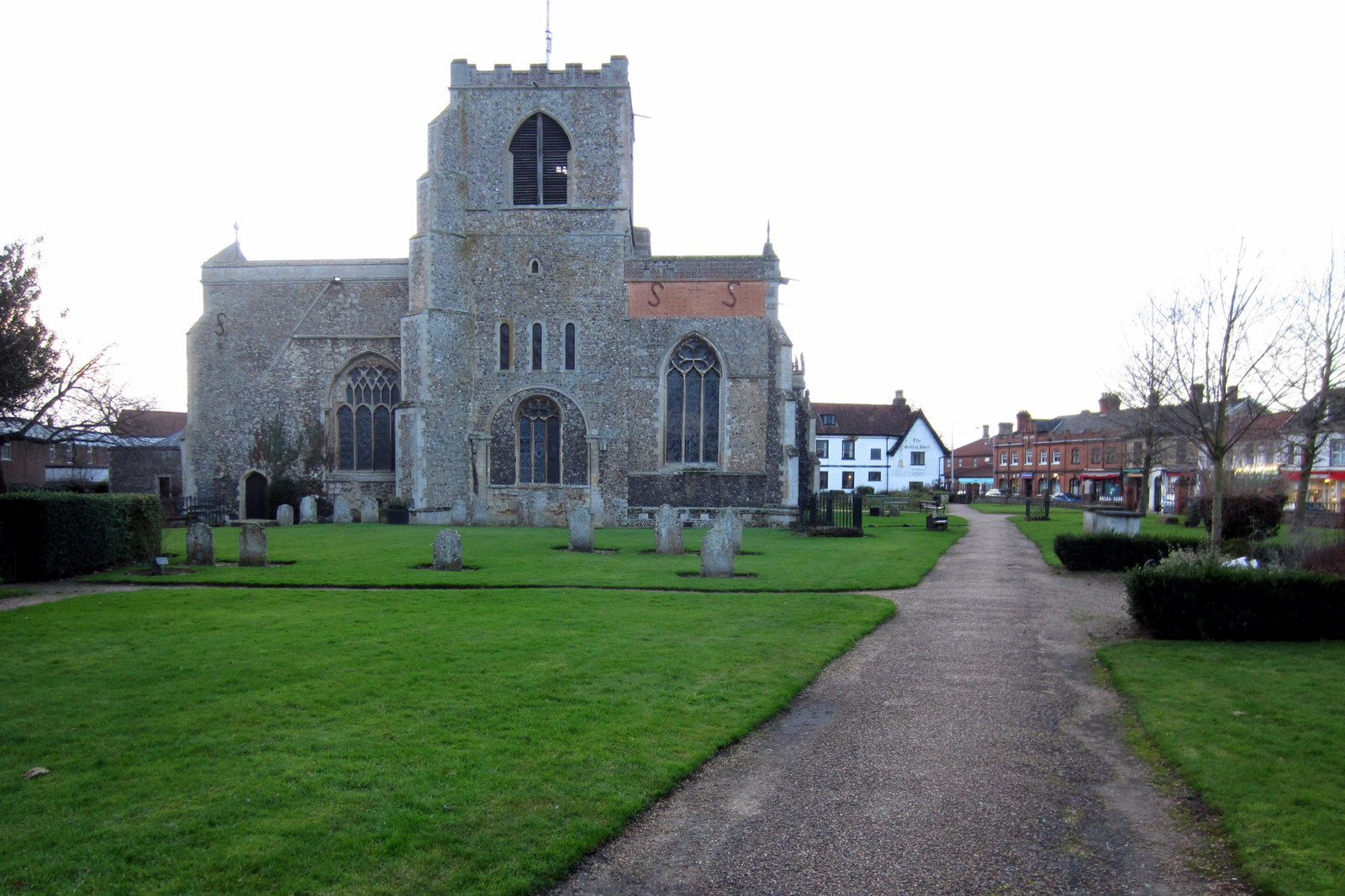
Attleborough, the third-largest settlement in the district

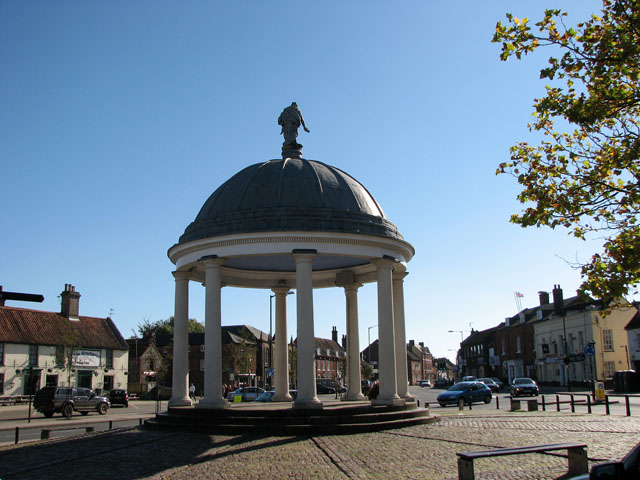
Swaffham, the fourth-largest settlement in the district

=== Elections ===
Since the last boundary changes in 2015 the council has comprised 49 councillors representing 27 wards, with each ward electing one, two or three councillors. Elections are held every four years.

==== UK Youth Parliament ====
Although the UK Youth Parliament is an apolitical organisation, the elections are run in a way similar to that of the Local Elections. The votes come from 11 to 18 year olds and are combined to make the decision of the next, 2 year Member of Youth Parliament. The elections are run at different times across the country with Breckland's typically being in early Spring and bi-annually.

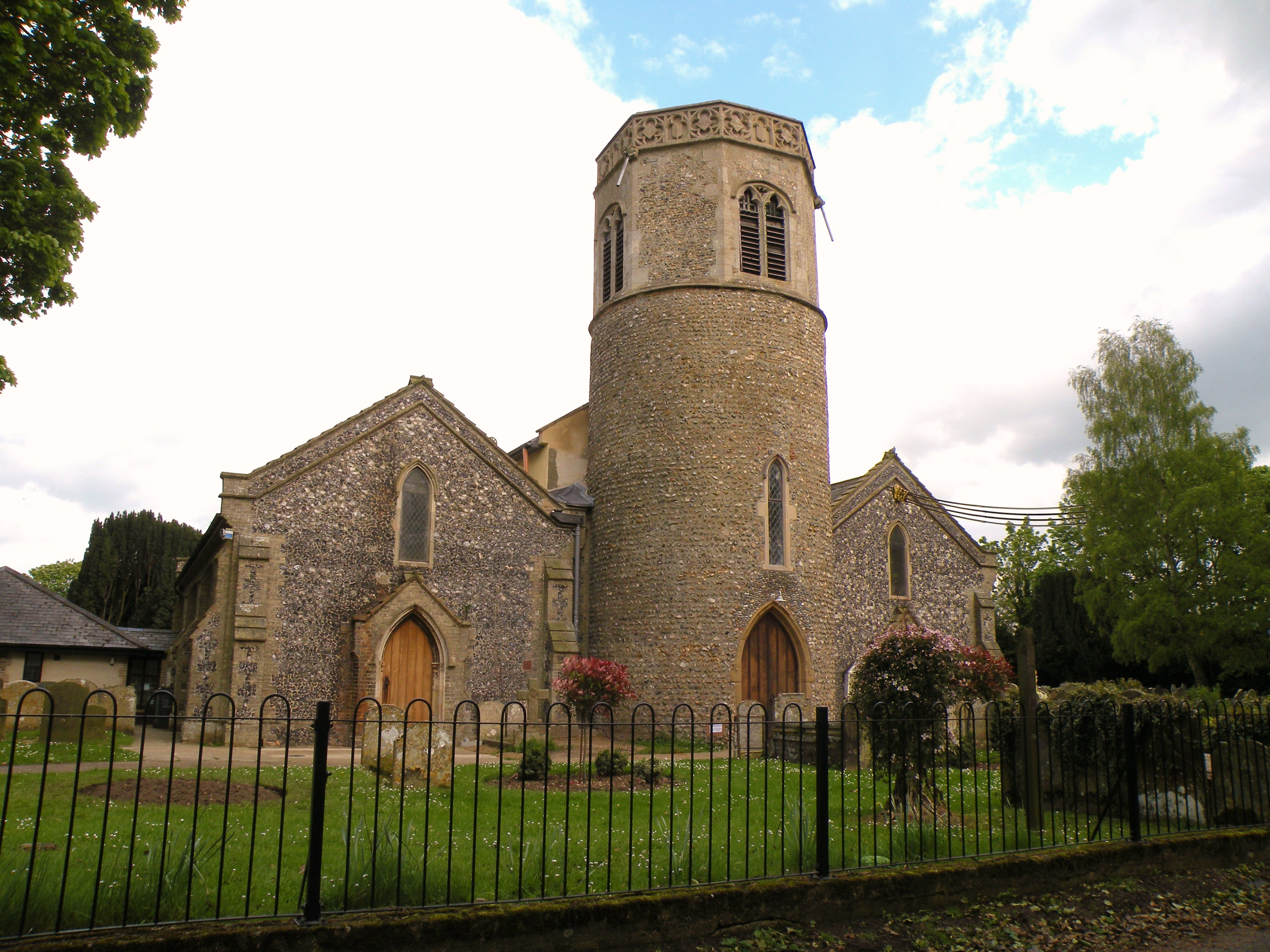
St Mary's Church, Watton, the fifth-largest settlement in the district

=== Premises ===
The council has its headquarters at Elizabeth House, a modern office building on the edge of Dereham; the council moved its main offices there in 2003. Prior to that it had been based at the Guildhall on St Withburga Lane in Dereham, which had previously been the offices of Mitford and Launditch Rural District Council, one of the council's predecessors.

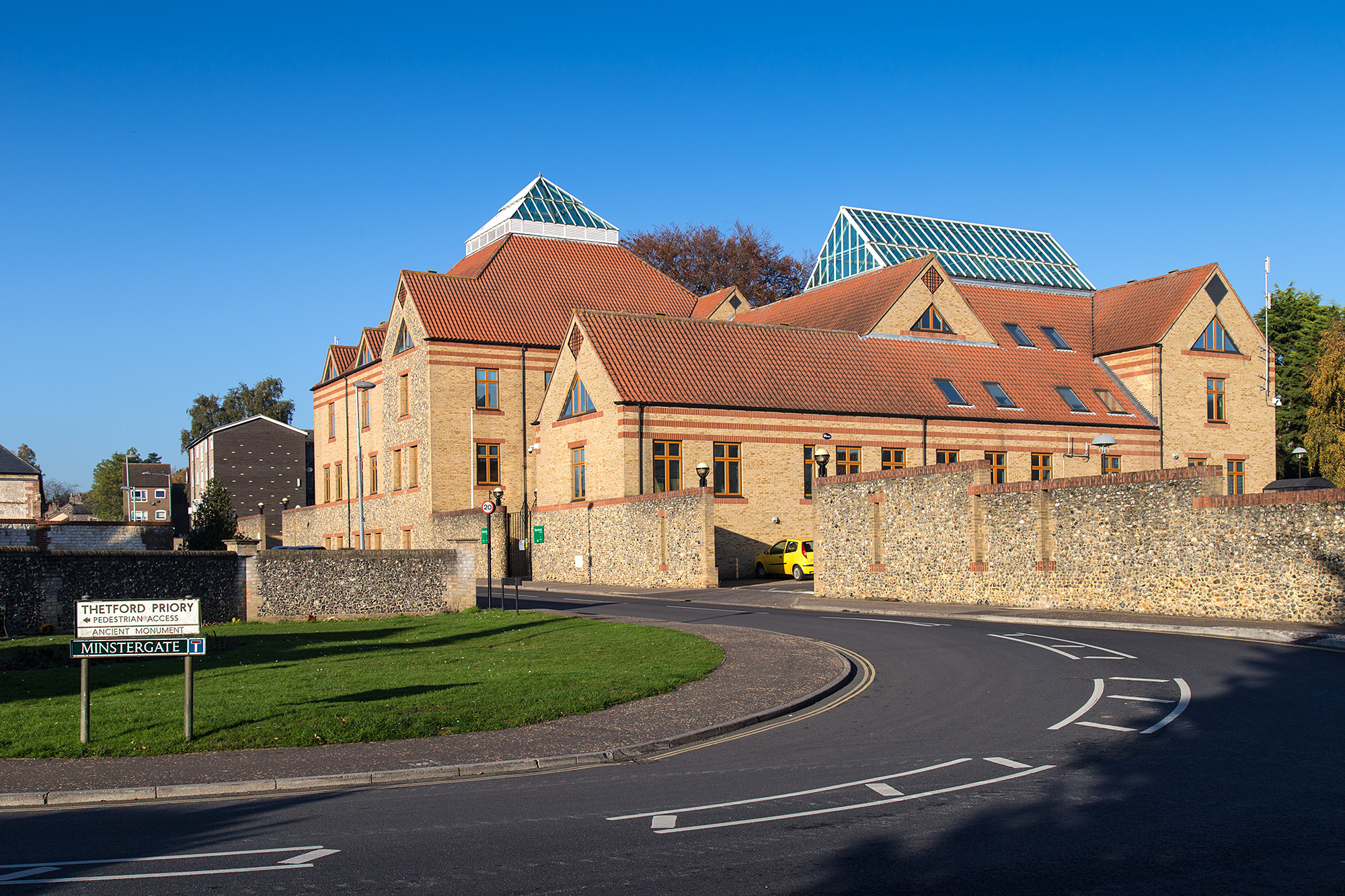
Breckland House, St Nicholas Street, Thetford: Council's area office in Thetford, built 1992.

The council also maintains an area office at Breckland House on St Nicholas Street in Thetford, which was completed in 1992 and formally opened on 20 May 1993 by Elizabeth II.

== Towns and parishes ==
The district is entirely divided into 113 civil parishes. The parish councils for Attleborough, Dereham, Swaffham, Thetford and Watton have declared their parishes to be towns, allowing them to take the style "town council". Some of the smaller parishes have a parish meeting rather than a parish council. The parishes are:

- Ashill, Attleborough
- Banham, Bawdeswell, Beachamwell, Beeston with Bittering, Beetley, Besthorpe, Billingford, Bintree, Blo' Norton, Bradenham, Brettenham, Bridgham, Brisley, Bylaugh
- Carbrooke, Caston, Cockley Cley, Colkirk, Cranwich, Cranworth, Croxton
- Didlington, Dereham
- East Tuddenham, Elsing
- Foulden, Foxley, Fransham
- Garboldisham, Garvestone, Gateley, Gooderstone, Great Cressingham, Great Dunham, Great Ellingham, Great Hockham, Gressenhall, Griston, Guist
- Hardingham, Harling, Hilborough, Hockering, Hoe, Holme Hale, Horningtoft
- Ickburgh
- Kempstone, Kenninghall, Kilverstone
- Lexham, Litcham, Little Cressingham, Little Dunham, Little Ellingham, Longham, Lynford, Lyng
- Mattishall, Merton, Mileham, Mundford
- Narborough, Narford, Necton, New Buckenham, Newton by Castle Acre, North Elmham, North Lopham, North Pickenham, North Tuddenham
- Old Buckenham, Ovington, Oxborough
- Quidenham
- Riddlesworth, Rocklands, Rockland St Peter, Roudham and Larling, Rougham
- Saham Toney, Scarning, Scoulton, Shipdham, Shropham, Snetterton, South Acre, South Lopham, South Pickenham, Sparham, Sporle with Palgrave, Stanfield, Stanford, Stow Bedon, Sturston, Swaffham, Swanton Morley,
- Thetford, Thompson, Tittleshall, Tottington, Twyford
- Watton, Weasenham All Saints, Weasenham St. Peter, Weeting-with-Broomhill, Wellingham, Wendling, Whinburgh and Westfield, Whissonsett, Wretham
- Yaxham
