= Watton, Norfolk =

Town in Norfolk, England

Coordinates: 52.57127°N 0.82586°E

Watton
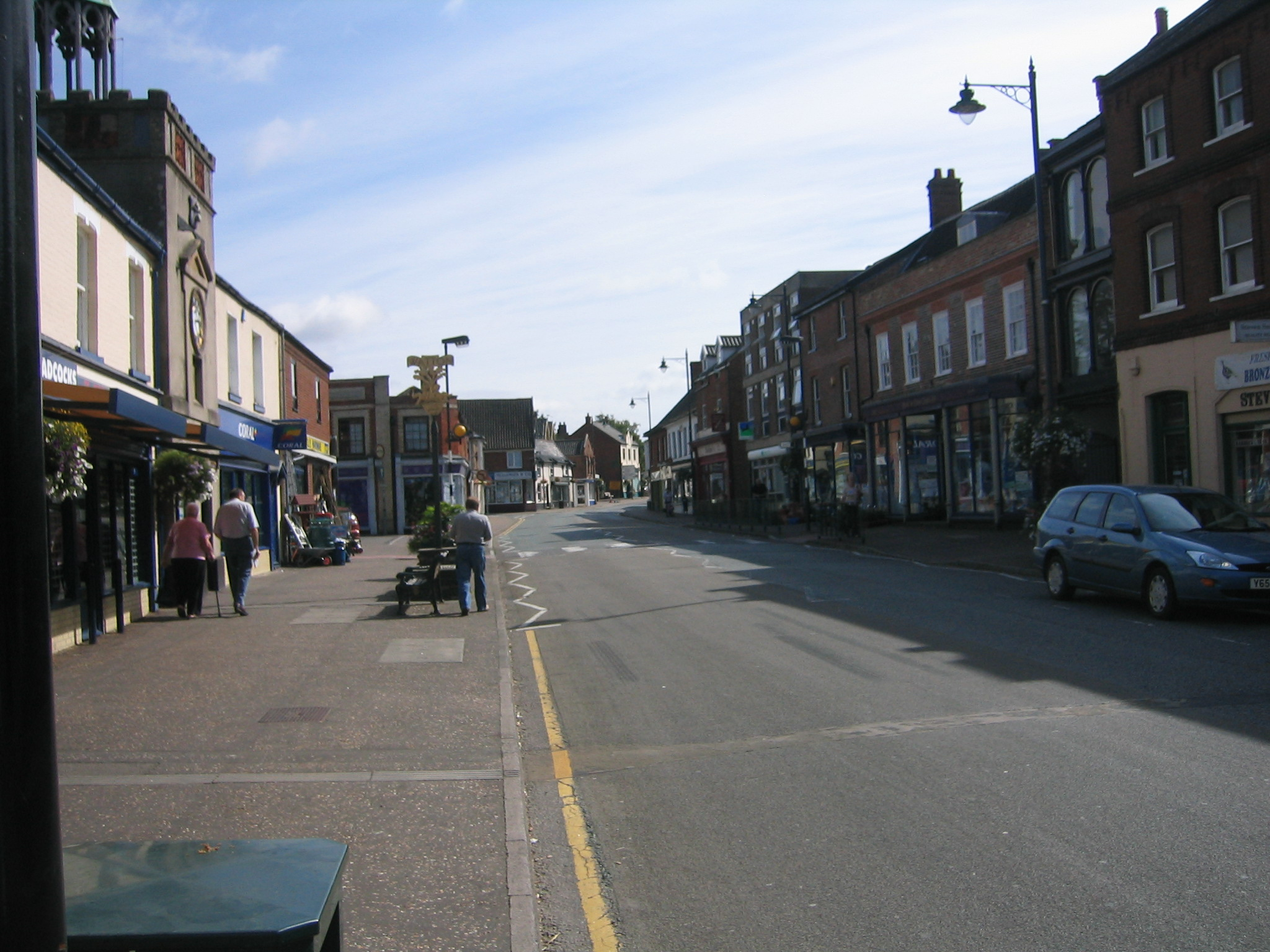
- Watton town centre

- Location within Norfolk
- Area: 7.20 km^{2} (2.78 sq mi)
- Population: 7,202 (2011 Census)
  - Density: 1,000/km^{2} (2,600/sq mi)
- OS grid reference: TF916008
- District: Breckland
- Shire county: Norfolk
- Region: East
- Country: England
- Sovereign state: United Kingdom
- Post town: THETFORD
- Postcode district: IP25
- Dialling code: 01953
- Police: Norfolk
- Fire: Norfolk
- Ambulance: East of England
- UK Parliament: Mid Norfolk

Watton is a market town in the Breckland district of Norfolk, England, about 25 miles (40 km) west-southwest of Norwich and 15 miles (24 km) northeast of Thetford. The annual Wayland Agricultural Show in its west is one of the oldest one-day such shows in England.

== Correct pronunciation ==
"Wottun"

== History ==
The towns name means 'Wada's farm/settlement'.

At the time of Edward the Confessor, Watton consisted of two manors, the head manor held by the freewoman Aldred, and the other held by Ralf FitzWalter, which was a gift of the King. By 1139 it was in the possession of Robert de Vaux. After passing to various descendants, Richard de Rupella (elsewhere Rokele) was granted the manor in 1249 as a reward for his service as a knight, and it came to be known as Rokele's Manor. In 1414, Watton fell under John, Lord Roos of Hamlak, and by 1462 the manors were owned by Richard Rosse and Robert Wessingham.

In 1608, Sir Edward Barkham bought Curson's manor (parcels of Watton Hall and Rokele manors), and in 1632 he was cited as the lord of Watton Hall, which he kept until after 1660. On 25 April 1674 a great fire broke out destroying sixty houses, the Butchers Shambles and other buildings, amounting to an estimated £7450 (equivalent to £1,200,000 in 2025) in structural damage. The town was rebuilt, and was visited by Thomas Baskerville in 1681 who noted the new buildings and a new bowling green at the "George" inn.

RAF Watton opened on 4 January 1939 under Command Group Captain F. J. Vincent. Between July 1944 and August 1945 it was used by the US 25th Bomber Group, a reconnaissance team. Command № 199 Squadron was based there in the early 1950s and operations ended in 1963. In 1995, part of the camp was sold to make way for the Blenheim Grange housing estate.

== Geography ==
Watton is 13 miles (21 km) northeast of Thetford and about 25 miles (40 km) southwest of Norwich; somewhat more by road. The A1075 Dereham-Thetford road and the B1108 Brandon-Norwich Road meet at a crossroads at Watton.

Saham Toney lies to the northwest, Ovington to the north, Carbrooke to the northeast and Griston to the southeast.

== Landmarks ==
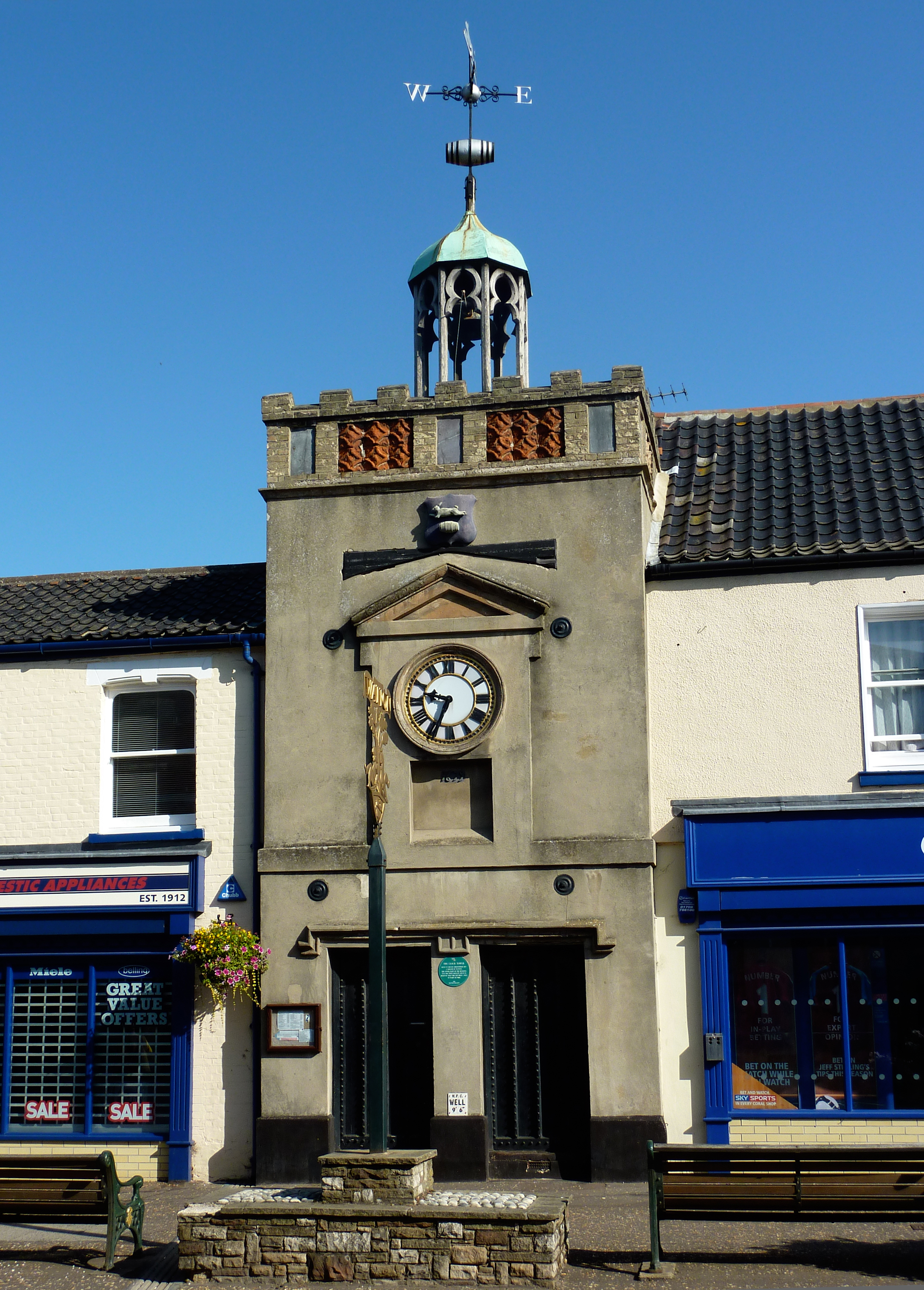
Watton Clock Tower

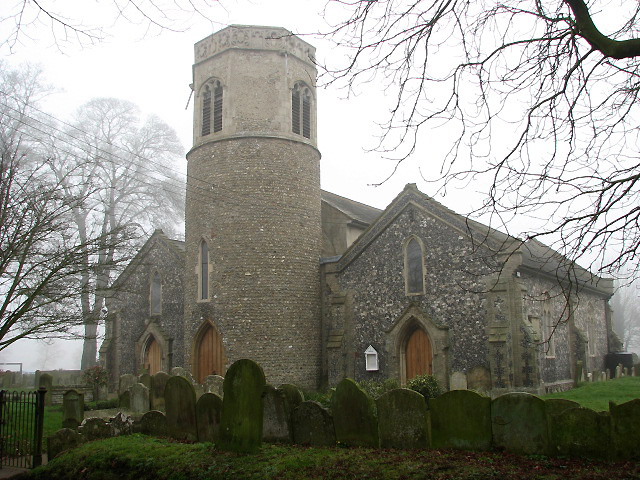
St Mary's Parish Church

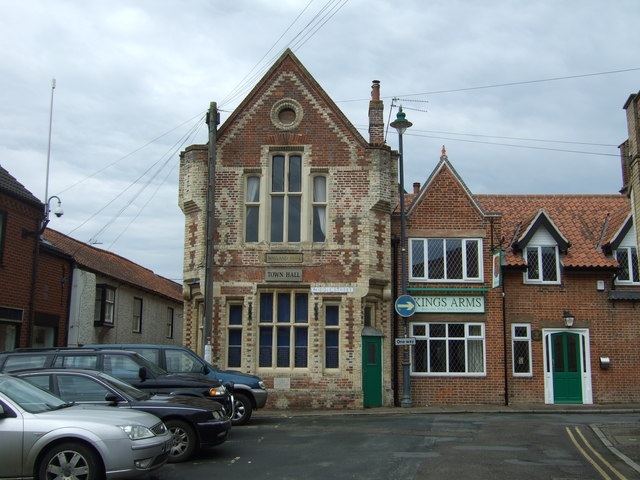
Wayland Hall

Watton High Street contains a distinctive Clock Tower which was built in 1679 by wealthy local merchant Christopher Hey after the fire of 1674, with a bell designed to act like an alarm bell to surrounding villages. In 1827 a new clock was installed, and the tower cemented, and in 1935 the clock face was updated to celebrate the Silver Jubilee of King George V and Queen Mary. Following a leak and the clock failing in 2015, it underwent restoration in 2017.

St Mary's Parish Church, at the end of Church Road to the north of the main road in Watton is dated to between 1100 and 1135 in the Norman and Gothic styles. It was originally dedicated to St Giles, but in the early 15th century it was rededicated to St Mary. In the 1840s it underwent significant alterations, with the aisles widened to accommodate up to 480 people. The six bells in the round tower were financed in 1899. In 2012 it was announced that the church was due to undergo a £500,000 refurbishment.

Wayland Hall, also known as Watton Town Hall, is the local community meeting place: it was completed in 1853.

== Culture ==
The Wayland Agricultural Show in western Watton is one of the oldest one-day agricultural shows in England, operational since at least 1880. The event features nationally rare livestock, cattle, pigs, sheep, fur, feather, many marquees and trade stands, displays of classic cars, vintage tractors, gun dogs, falconry and carriage rides, and many equestrian events. The event attracts up to 10,000 visitors annually. It was held in August, but in 2019 the organizers moved it to May Day weekend due to families often being away on holiday during August.

== Media ==
Local news and television programmes are provided by BBC East and ITV Anglia. Television signals are received from the Tacolneston TV transmitter. Local radio stations are BBC Radio Norfolk, Heart East, and Greatest Hits Radio Norfolk & North Suffolk. The town's local newspaper is the Watton and Swaffham Times.

== Education ==
Wayland Academy on Merton Road was converted to academy status in August 2012, and was previously a community school under the direct control of Norfolk County Council.

== Sport ==
Watton United F.C. was established in 1888. In the 2015–16 season the team won Anglian Combination Division Three, and a 3rd place finish the following season in Division Two in 2016–17 saw them win promotion to Anglian Combination Division One. Richmond Park Golf Club is between Watton and Saham Toney. In 2019 it was announced that the club will be transformed into a luxury private resort, with the addition of a 60-bedroom hotel, gym, spa and swimming pools.

== Transport ==
A station at Watton, on the Thetford & Watton Railway, opened in October 1869 and closed in June 1964 as part of the Beeching cuts. The line itself was closed in April 1965. In 2018, more than 900 residents signed a petition to look at a new station and train service in Watton.

The A1075 is the main road through Watton, connecting it to Thetford and Dereham.
