= Saham Toney =

Village in Norfolk, England

Coordinates: 52.58261°N 0.80333°E

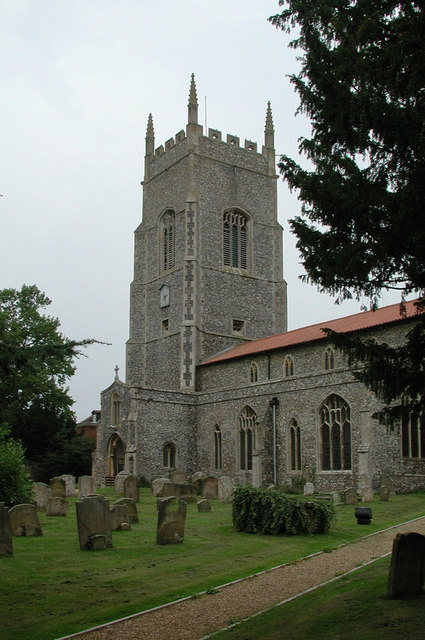
- St George's parish church, Saham Toney

- Location within Norfolk
- Area: 16.51 km^{2} (6.37 sq mi)
- Population: 1,507 (2011 census)
  - Density: 91/km^{2} (240/sq mi)
- OS grid reference: TF899020
  - London: 101 miles (163 km)
- Civil parish: Saham Toney
- District: Breckland
- Shire county: Norfolk
- Region: East
- Country: England
- Sovereign state: United Kingdom
- Post town: THETFORD
- Postcode district: IP25
- Dialling code: 01953
- Police: Norfolk
- Fire: Norfolk
- Ambulance: East of England

Saham Toney is a village and a civil parish in the English county of Norfolk. The village is 14.5 miles (23.3 km) north of Thetford, 27.3 miles (43.9 km) west of Norwich and 101 miles (163 km) north-east of London. The village lies 13.1 miles (21.1 km) west of the town of Attleborough. The nearest railway station is at Attleborough for the Breckland Line which runs between Cambridge and Norwich. The nearest airport is Norwich International Airport. The civil parish has an area of 16.51 km^{2} (6.37 sq mi) and in 2001 had a population of 1,565 in 680 households, reducing to 1,507 in 679 households at the 2011 Census. For the purposes of local government, the parish falls within the district of Breckland.

== History ==
There is evidence that Saham Toney was close to a significant Romano-British settlement. The Peddars Way footpath, partly using remaining Roman roads, passes close to the village.

The village derives part of its name from the 13-acre (53,000 m^{2}) mere that is in the parish. The mere is well stocked with fish, especially two species of eel; one noted for its delicious, and the other for its nauseous, flavour, also one is of a peculiar shape. There are also large pike in the mere. The privately owned mere, which is dangerous, is thought to be as old as the last ice age. Access is by special permission of the owner only.

Saham Toney Windmill is a tower mill that was built in 1824 and has been converted to residential use. It was owned from 1995 to 2015 by pop singer Shakin' Stevens.

== Etymology ==
Saham Toney derives the first part of its name from the Old English meaning homestead by the lake. However, Toney refers to the fact the land was owned by Ralph de Toeni, standard-bearer of William I, in the period shortly after the Norman conquest.

== Village amenities ==
Amenities in the village include a public house, hotel and Parker's VC C of E Primary school attended by over 100 pupils.

== The Parish Church of Saint George ==
The parish church of Saint George is constructed from flint and has a 15th-century tower containing six bells and a clock. The church has some very beautiful stained glass windows, the east window of the chancel portrays the Last Supper; this was a gift by the Rev. W. H. Parker, who restored the whole building at considerable expense in 1864. The nave arcades, clerestory, and part of the chancel date from the 14th century.

== Notable residents ==
Former British Prime Minister John Major was evacuated to the village from 1944 to 1945 as an infant during World War II.

Frank Lee Woodward (1871–1952), an English educationist, Pali scholar, author and theosophist.
