= Great Cressingham =

Village in Norfolk, England

Coordinates: 52.565608°N 0.76455°E

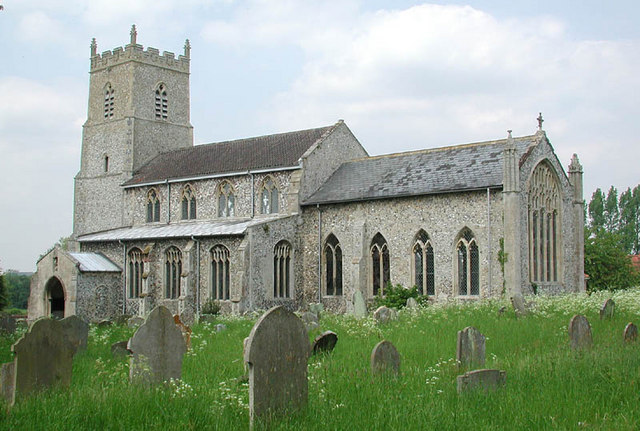
- St. Michael's Churchyard

- Location within Norfolk
- Area: 8.39 sq mi (21.7 km^{2})
- Population: 439 (2021 census)
  - Density: 52/sq mi (20/km^{2})
- OS grid reference: TF850015
- District: Breckland
- Shire county: Norfolk
- Region: East
- Country: England
- Sovereign state: United Kingdom
- Post town: Thetford
- Postcode district: IP25
- Dialling code: 01760
- Police: Norfolk
- Fire: Norfolk
- Ambulance: East of England
- UK Parliament: South West Norfolk

Great Cressingham is a village and civil parish in the English county of Norfolk.

Great Cressingham is located 6 miles (10 km) south of Swaffham and 24 miles (39 km) west of Norwich.

== History ==
Great Cressingham's name is of Anglo-Saxon origin and derives from the Old English for the larger settlement of Cressa's people.

In the Domesday Book of 1086, Great Cressingham is listed as a settlement of 49 households in the hundred of South Greenhoe. In 1086, the village was part of the East Anglian estates of Count Alan of Brittany, William d'Ecouis, Bishop of Thetford and Ralph de Tosny.

Priory Farm is the former site of a Fifteenth Century manor house which was owned by the Priory of Norwich.

A school was founded in Great Cressingham in 1840, it was closed in 1992. After its closure, the school was bought by Tom & Sally North who restored the school to its Victorian state and keep it open for educational visits.

The Olde Windmill Inn has been open in the village since 1789.

== Geography ==
According to the 2021 census, Great Cressingham has a population of 439 people which shows an increase from the 421 people recorded in the 2011 census.

Great Cressingham is located along the course of the River Wissey.

== St. Michael's Church ==
Great Cressingham's parish church is dedicated to Saint Michael and dates from the Fifteenth Century. St. Michael's is located on Watton Road and has been Grade I listed since 1960. St. Michael's is no longer open for Sunday services.

St. Michael's features a good range of Fifteenth Century stained-glass from Norwich and several brass and marble memorials, largely to the Rysle family.

== Governance ==
Great Cressingham is part of the electoral ward of Ashill for local elections and is part of the district of Breckland.

The village's national constituency is South West Norfolk which has been represented by Labour's Terry Jermy MP since 2024.

== War Memorial ==
Great Cressingham War Memorial is a granite wheel cross with a sword of sacrifice inside St. Michael's Churchyard. The memorial lists the following names for the First World War:

Rank	Name	Unit	Date of death	Burial/Commemoration
Cpl.	George R. Cockerill	1st Bn., Norfolk Regiment	11 Oct. 1917	Tyne Cot
LCpl.	Cecil Newton	9th Bn., Norfolk Regt.	15 Sep. 1916	Thiepval Memorial
Gnr.	Arthur J. Buckle	47 Div Ammo Col., Royal Field Artillery	5 May 1917	Lijssenthoek Cemetery
Gnr.	Charles E. Reynolds	7th Bty., Royal Garrison Artillery	21 Jun. 1918	St. Omer Cemetery
Pte.	Bertie Garrod	2nd Bn., Bedfordshire Regiment	9 Apr. 1917	Bucquoy Road Cemetery
Pte.	Robert J. Reynolds	1st Bn., Cambridgeshire Regiment	31 Jul. 1917	Menin Gate
Pte.	Thomas E. Cockerill	13th Bn., East Surrey Regiment	25 Mar. 1918	Bac-du-Sud Cemetery
Pte.	William J. Anthony	1st Bn., Norfolk Regiment	27 Jul. 1916	Thiepval Memorial
Pte.	Hubert A. Alderton	3/5th Bn., Norfolk Regt.	25 Sep. 1917	St. Michael's Churchyard
Pte.	Alec J. Matthews	9th Bn., Norfolk Regt.	4 Feb. 1917	Vermelles Cemetery
Pte.	Bertie Sutton	1st Bn., Northamptonshire Regiment	9 May 1915	Le Touret Memorial
Spr.	Albert G. Hoggett	208th Coy., Royal Engineers	9 Aug. 1916	Flatiron Copse Cemetery
