= Wissington, Norfolk =

Sugar factory in Norfolk, England

Coordinates: 52.550251°N 0.449442°E

Wissington
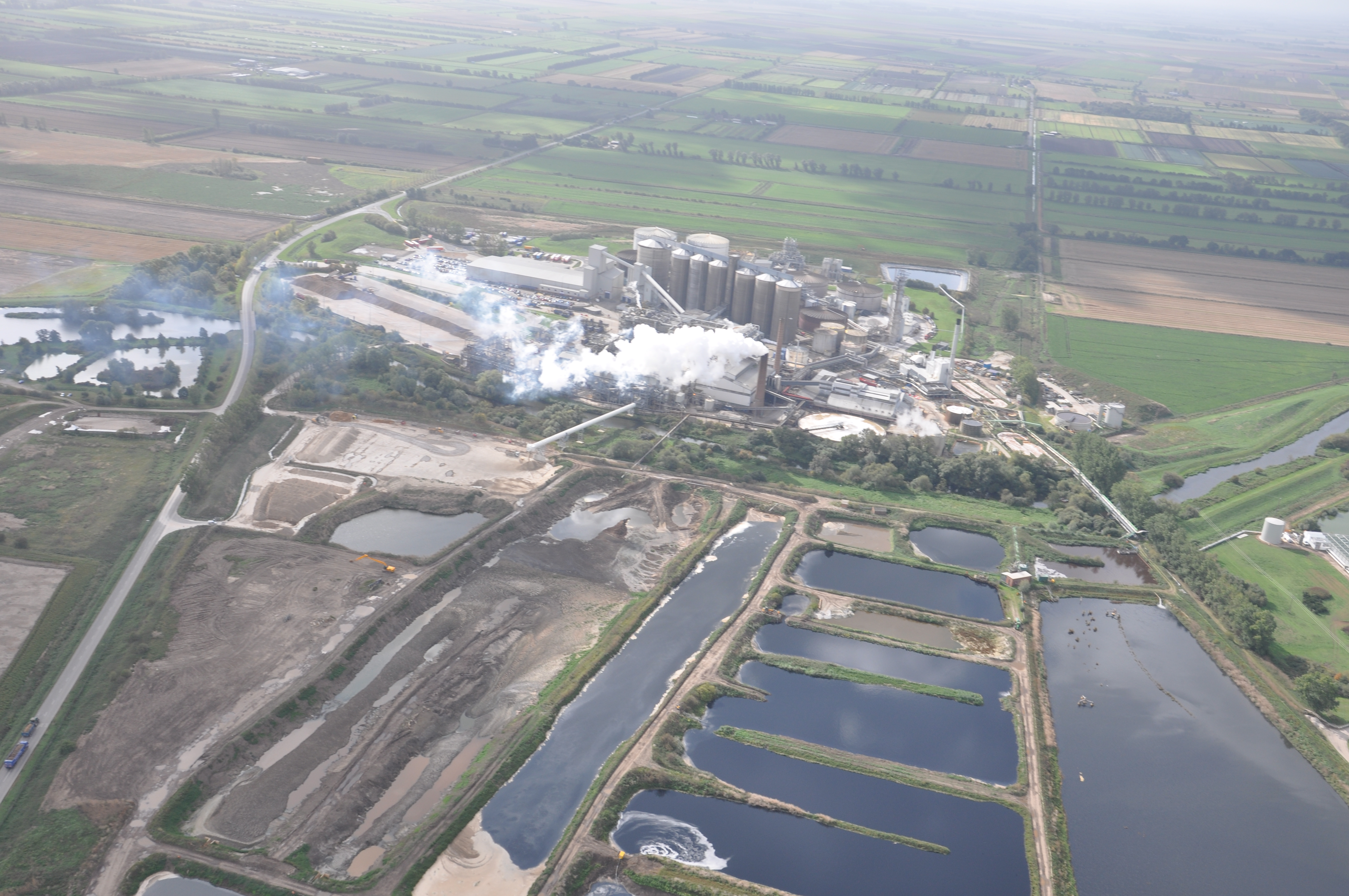
- Wissington Sugar Factory from the north. The River Wissey runs from left to right.

- Location within Norfolk
- Shire county: Norfolk
- Region: East
- Country: England
- Sovereign state: United Kingdom
- Post town: KING'S LYNN
- Postcode district: PE33
- Dialling code: 01366
- Police: Norfolk
- Fire: Norfolk
- Ambulance: East of England

Wissington is a former hamlet in Norfolk. It is the site of British Sugar's largest sugar factory in the UK; it is also the largest in Europe. There has been a sugar factory there since 1925. None of the rest of the hamlet remains, other than the name. British Sugar has opened the UK's first bioethanol plant here.

== History ==
=== Before 1900 ===
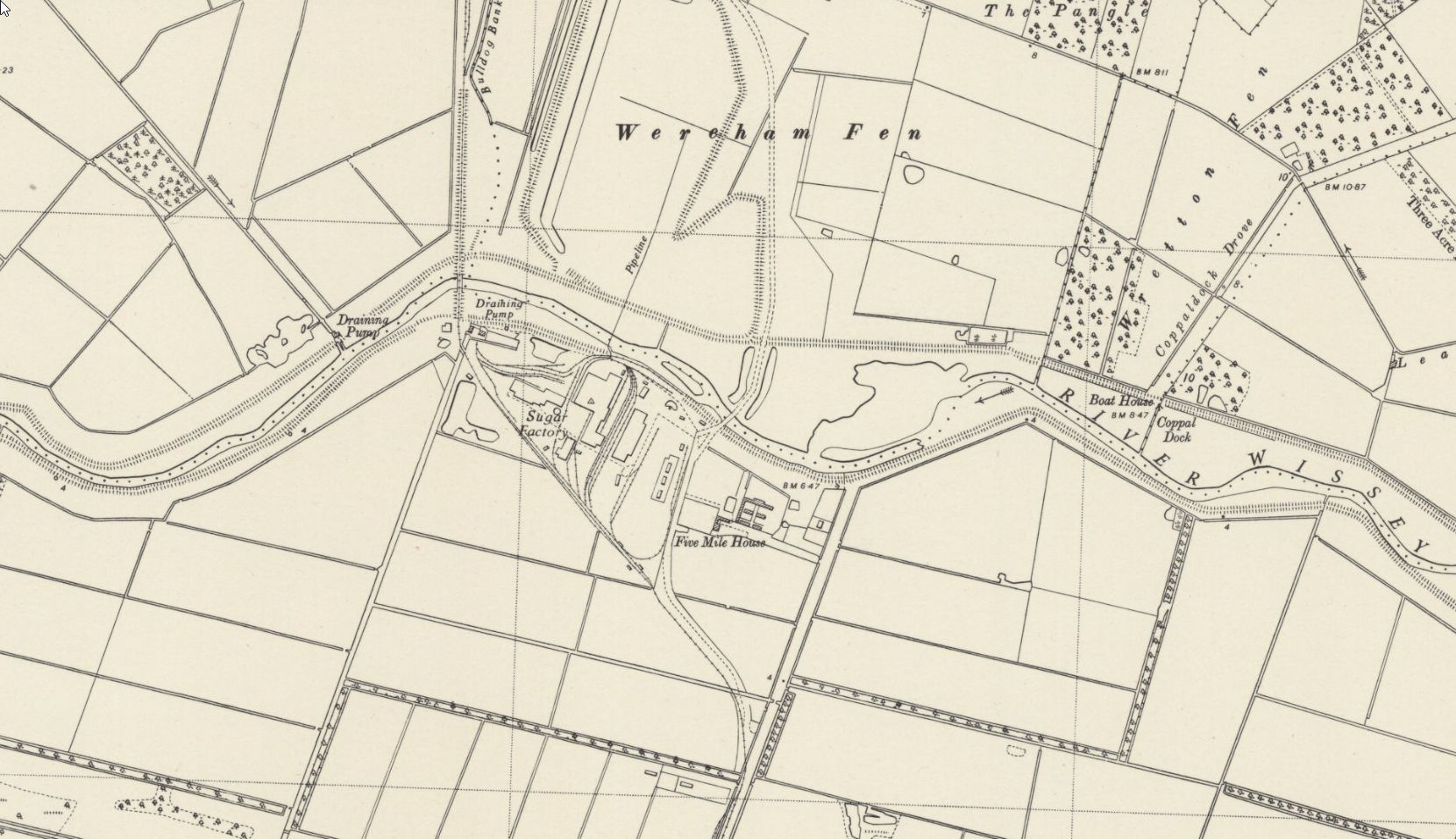
Wissington on a 1950 map

The site called Wissington was a hamlet on the south bank of the River Wissey. In 1884, it had a ferry house and the Five Mile House. The name Five Mile House points to the latter being an inn. It happened to be located about five miles from the confluence of the River Wissey with the Ouse, but that might be a coincidence.

The navigable river Wissey traditionally provided cheap transport for the area. Downstream this was mainly agricultural produce. Upstream, this included things like wine, salt, sea fish, timber, and bricks. Transport was provided by small open barges called lighters. These formed trains of about five vessels drawn by horses.

Due to the competition by rail and road links, commercial traffic on the river decreased rapidly in the second half of the nineteenth century. It would virtually cease by the 1920s.

=== 20th century ===
In the early twentieth century, Arthur Keeble, a farmer and businessman bought a large estate of fenland south of the river Wissey. Inspired by Wissey town, he named his estate Wissington. He intended to produce ammonia out of the nitrogen-rich Fenland peat. Keeble built an ammonia factory and his own Wissington Light Railway to support its operation.

==== Wissington Light Railway ====
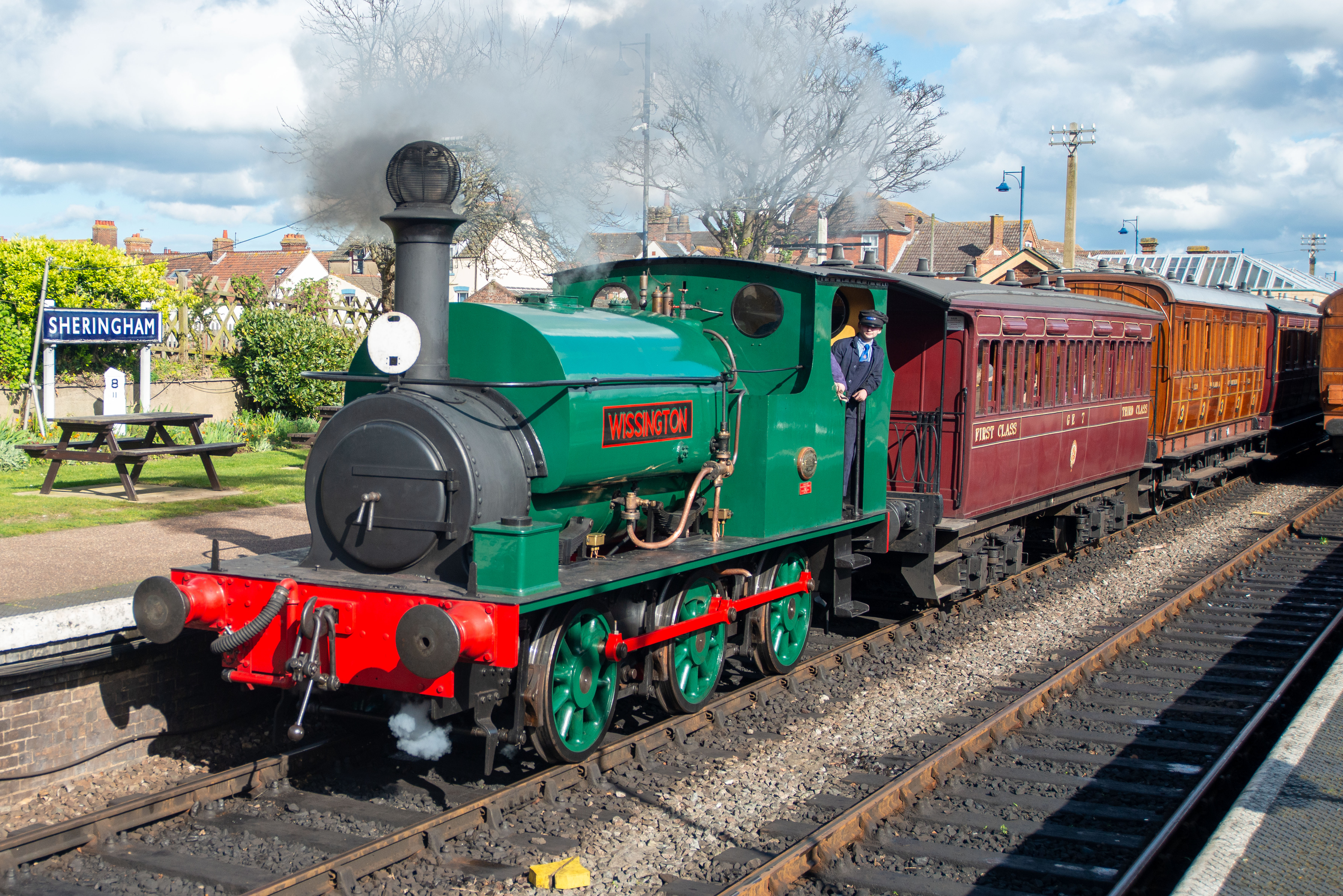
Locomotive Wissington

The Wissington Light Railway was built in 1905, and opened on 30 November 1905. It was built by Arthur Keeble to support his ammonia factory, but it also served local farms. It even carried passengers on Lynn and Downham market days. North of Wissington, it left the Downham and Stoke Ferry Railway at Abbey Junction, which was located near Station Farm. The line then crossed the river, and continued for some 10 miles (16 km) to a terminus at Poppylot. The line was unusual, in that it was not authorised either by an act of Parliament or by a light railway order.

When the sugar factory was built in 1925, there was no road access to it. The owners of the factory leased the Wissington line. They extended it with another 8 miles (13 km) of track, which ensured that sugar beet could reach the plant in sufficient volume to make it efficient. During World War II, the Ministry of Agriculture deemed that the factory was of strategic importance and took responsibility for it from March 1941. It drafted in Italian prisoners of war to refurbish the railway.

After the war, the Ministry bought the railway in 1947, and ran it themselves. In 1957 they closed the lines to the south of the factory, as most sugar beet was by then delivered to the factory by road. Final closure came in 1982 when improvements to the line (by this point operation was between Denver near Downham Market and Wissington) were required. Some of the steam engines used on the line have been preserved. These being Hudswell Clarke No. 1700 'Wissington' at the North Norfolk Railway, No. 1539 'Derek Crouch' (also by Hudswell Clarke) at the Nene Valley Railway and Manning Wardle No. 1532 'Newcastle' at the Beamish Museum.

==== Wissington Sugar Factory ====
In 1918, William Towler bought Keeble's land. He extended the railway and in 1925, his efforts led to the foundation of the Wissington Sugar Factory. British Sugar Manufacturers was the founding company. In 1936, it merged with 15 other companies to form British Sugar Corporation. This company still manages the plant.

==== Pulled barges on the Wissey ====
The foundation of the sugar factory led to a revival of commercial navigation on the Wissey. Three tugs, named Hilgay, Littleport and Wissington, and 24 steel barges of 20 tons capacity, were used to transport goods for the factory. This entailed bringing products of the factory to King's Lynn and returning with coal for the factory.

These barges were also used to bring sugar beet to the factory. Farmers would bring the beet to public landing places of Stoke Ferry and Hilgay as well as to private ones. This was done by horse and cart. The final step was to get the beet over the high river bank. A movie made about the Dutch Halfweg sugar factory in the 1930s depicts harvesting beet and loading them onto barges.

==== Roads ====
During World War II, Italian prisoners of war constructed the first road to the factory.

== Today ==
The plant is now supplied by lorry, collecting product from 50 miles (80 km) radius. In 2007, Wissington was the site of the UK's first bioethanol power plant, the excess heat from which was used to heat on-site greenhouses that produced 70 million tomatoes each year; in 2017, the greenhouses switched to producing cannabis sativa plants for medicine production.
