= Stoke Ferry railway station =

Former railway station in England

Stoke Ferry
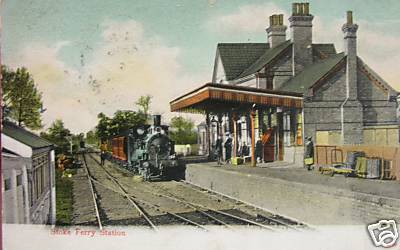

General information
- Location: Stoke Ferry, King's Lynn and West Norfolk; England
- Coordinates: 52.5677°N 0.5176°E
- Grid reference: TL706996
- Platforms: 1

Other information
- Status: Disused

History
- Original company: Downham and Stoke Ferry Railway
- Pre-grouping: Great Eastern Railway
- Post-grouping: London and North Eastern Railway

Key dates
- 1 August 1882: Station opens
- 22 September 1930: Closed to passengers
- 1965: closed for freight
Location

Stoke Ferry is a closed railway station in Norfolk. It was the terminus of a 7 1/4-mile (11.7 km) branch line from Denver which opened on 1 August 1882 and finally closed to all traffic in 1965.

== History ==
The Downham and Stoke Ferry Railway opened on 1 August 1882, and Stoke Ferry station opened with the line.

Bradshaw's Railway Guide 1922 shows a service of 4 trains a day on weekdays only between Stoke Ferry and Downham on the Great Eastern Railway's Cambridge to King's Lynn line.

The village of Stoke Ferry lies on the River Wissey and the station was on the southern edge of the village.

The station closed to passengers on 22 September 1930.

== Routes ==
Preceding station	Disused railways	Following station
Terminus	Great Eastern Railway; Stoke Ferry Branch	Abbey and West Dereham; Line and station closed

== See also ==
- List of closed railway stations in Norfolk
- Ryston
- Abbey and West Dereham
