= Pickenham =

Pickenham may refer to:

- South Pickenham
- North Pickenham
