= Ouse Bridge railway station =

Former railway station in England

Ouse Bridge

General information
- Location: Fordham, King's Lynn and West Norfolk; England
- Coordinates: 52.5629°N 0.3480°E
- Grid reference: TL592985

Other information
- Status: Disused

History
- Original company: East Anglian Railways
- Pre-grouping: Great Eastern Railway

Key dates
- 25 October 1847: Opened as Ouze Bridge
- April 1854: Renamed Ouse Bridge
- 1 January 1864: Closed
Location

Ouse Bridge railway station was a railway station in Norfolk, England.

== History ==
The Lynn and Ely Railway (L&ER) had opened between King's Lynn and Downham on 27 October 1846. On 25 October 1847, the line was extended to Ely; but in the meantime, on 22 July 1847, the L&ER had amalgamated with the Lynn and Dereham Railway and the Ely and Huntingdon Railway to form the East Anglian Railways. The station was opened with the line to Ely, and was originally named Ouze Bridge. It was approximately halfway between Denver and Hilgay Fen, which opened at the same time.

The station was renamed Ouse Bridge in April 1854, and closed on 1 January 1864.

== Route ==
Preceding station	Historical railways	Following station
Hilgay; Line open, station closed	Great Eastern Railway; Fen Line	Denver; Line open, station closed
