= Kettlestone =

Village in Norfolk, England

Coordinates: 52.84724°N 0.92228°E

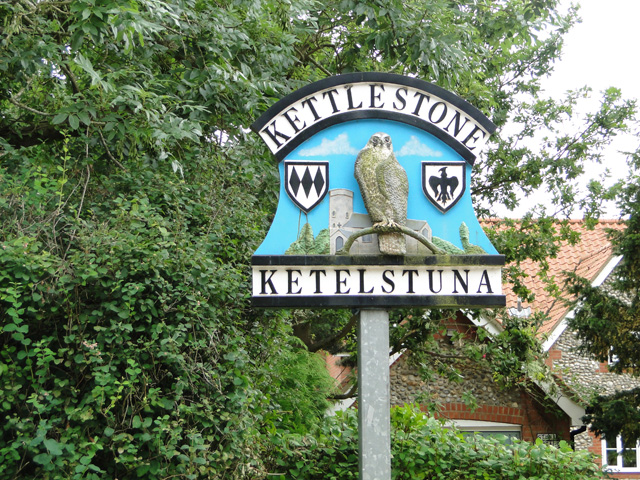
- Kettlestone Village Sign

- Location within Norfolk
- Area: 2.92 sq mi (7.6 km^{2})
- Population: 193 (2021 census)
  - Density: 66/sq mi (25/km^{2})
- OS grid reference: TF968317
- Civil parish: Kettlestone
- District: North Norfolk
- Shire county: Norfolk
- Region: East
- Country: England
- Sovereign state: United Kingdom
- Post town: FAKENHAM
- Postcode district: NR21
- Dialling code: 01328
- Police: Norfolk
- Fire: Norfolk
- Ambulance: East of England
- UK Parliament: Broadland and Fakenham

Kettlestone is a village and civil parish in the English county of Norfolk. The civil parish also includes the hamlet of Pensthorpe.

Kettlestone is located 5 miles (8.0 km) east of Fakenham and 22 miles (35 km) north-west of Norwich.

== History ==
Kelling's name is of Anglo-Saxon origin and derives from the Old English for Ketil's settlement.

In the Domesday Book, Kettlestone is listed as a settlement of 4 households in the hundred of Gallow. In 1086, the village was part of the East Anglian estates of William de Warenne.

The body of a man by the name of William Anthony was gibbeted at Gibbet Piece (TF96012919) on Kettlestone Common from around March 1792. His bones remained in the gibbet for decades, being the subject of a painting in 1822. In 1830 the bones were buried, the gibbet was dismantled, and its wood was made into gates for the porch of the nearby church which themselves no longer survive.

In 1958, an observation post for the Royal Observer Corps was built in the parish which closed ten years later.

== Geography ==
According to the 2021 census, Kettlestone has a population of 193 people which shows a decrease from the 197 people recorded in the 2011 census.

Pensthorpe Natural Park is located in the civil parish, along the River Wensum.

== All Saints' Church ==
Kettlestone's parish church has a late-13th or early-14th century octagonal tower, one of only six of this shape in Norfolk. All Saints holds numerous memorials from the 18th century. Its south porch and chancel dates from the 19th century and was built by Frederick Preedy. It is located on The Street and has been Grade II listed since 1959. The church is no longer open for Sunday service and is part of the Way-Maker Benefice.

== Governance ==
Kettlestone is part of the electoral ward of Stibbard for local elections and is part of the district of North Norfolk. The village's national constituency is Broadland and Fakenham which has been represented by the Conservative Party's Jerome Mayhew MP since 2019.

== War memorial ==
Kettlestone War Memorial is a latin-cross memorial in All Saints' Churchyard which lists the following names for the First World War:

Rank	Name	Unit	Date of death	Burial/Commemoration
Sgt.	Sidney Harrison MM	15th Bn., Durham Light Infantry	26 Oct. 1918	Delsaux Farm Cemetery
Pte.	Albert Harrison	50th (Calgary) Bn., CEF	2 Sep. 1918	Dury Crucifix Cemetery
Pte.	Thomas Williamson	4th Bn., Grenadier Guards	27 Sep. 1915	Loos Memorial
Pte.	Frank W. Moore	7th Bn., Norfolk Regiment	12 Aug. 1916	Thiepval Memorial
Pte.	Frederick P. Lacey	8th Bn., Norfolk Regt.	5 Oct. 1916	Connaught Cemetery
Pte.	George Colman	9th Bn., Norfolk Regt.	16 Sep. 1916	Corbie Cemetery
Pte.	Sidney Green	9th Bn., Norfolk Regt.	17 Mar. 1916	Lijssenthoek Cemetery
Rfn.	Walter Blunkett	Queen Victoria's Bn., London Regt.	13 Aug. 1917	Hooge Crater Cemetery
