= Wissington =

Wissington may refer to:

- Wissington, Suffolk
- Wissington, Norfolk
