= Hilgay =

Village in Norfolk, England

Coordinates: 52.559°N 0.390°E

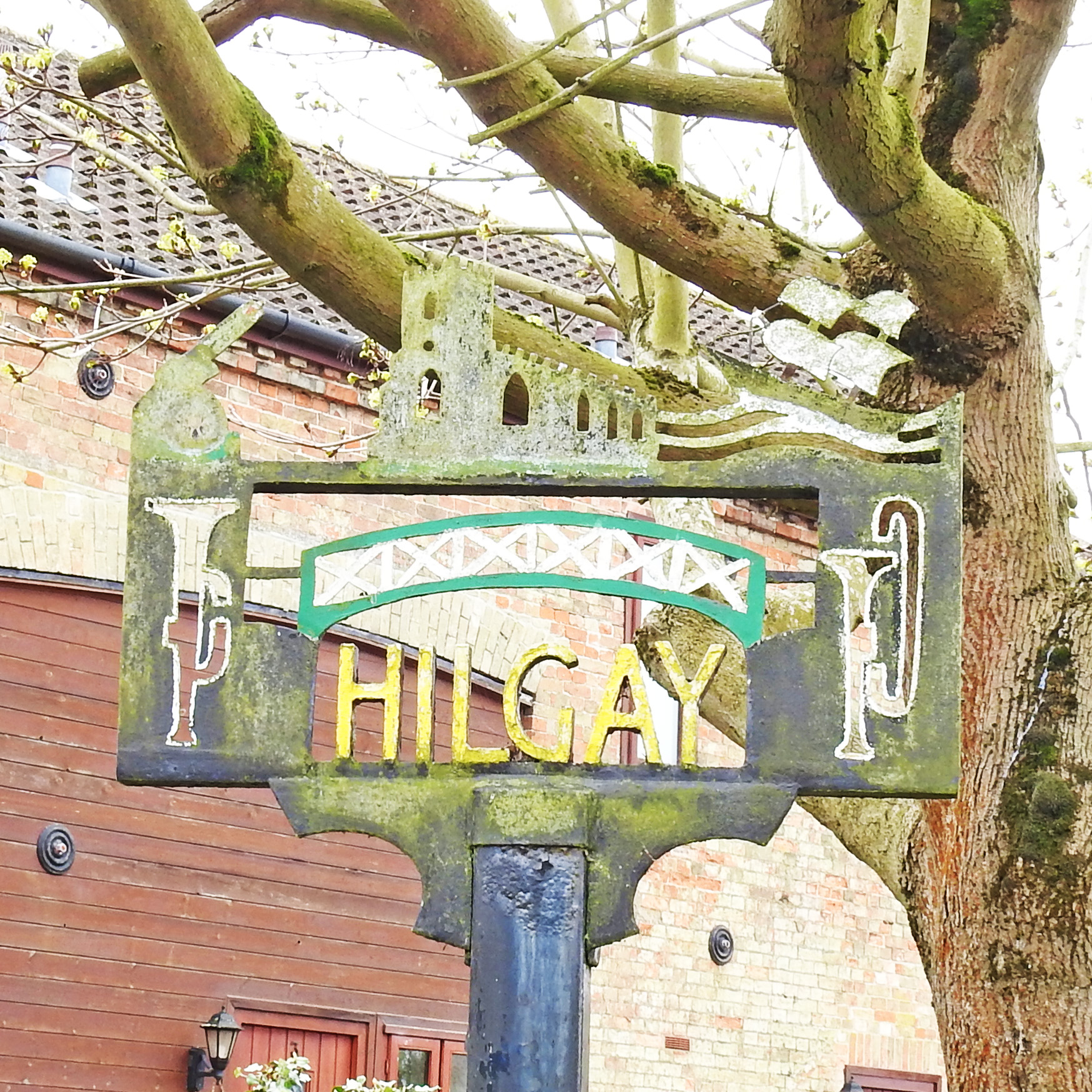
- Hilgay Village Sign

- Location within Norfolk
- Area: 12.88 sq mi (33.4 km^{2})
- Population: 1,346 (2021 census)
  - Density: 105/sq mi (41/km^{2})
- OS grid reference: TL621983
- Civil parish: Hilgay
- District: King's Lynn and West Norfolk
- Shire county: Norfolk
- Region: East
- Country: England
- Sovereign state: United Kingdom
- Post town: DOWNHAM MARKET
- Postcode district: PE38
- Dialling code: 01366
- UK Parliament: South West Norfolk

Hilgay is a village and civil parish in the English county of Norfolk. The civil parish also includes the hamlet of Ten Mile Bank.

Hilgay is located 4 miles (6 km) south of Downham Market and 38 miles (61 km) west of Norwich, close to the course of the River Wissey and River Great Ouse.

== History ==
Hilgay's name is of Anglo-Saxon origin and derives from the Old English for the island of Hydla's people.

In the Domesday Book, Hilgay is recorded as a settlement of 55 households in the hundred of Clackclose. In 1086, the village was divided between the estates of King William I, William de Warenne, Roger Bigod, Bury St Edmunds Abbey, St Etheldreda's Abbey, St Benedict's Abbey and Hermer de Ferrers.

In 1291, Modney Priory, a Benedictine cell of St Benedict's Abbey in Ramsey was built in the parish. The priory was dissolved by King Henry VIII in 1539.

A 19th-century iron lattice bridge was built in the parish, known as Ten Mile Bank Bridge. The bridge was demolished in 2004.

In 2018, nine one-metre square test pits were dug as part of an archaeological investigation. The report was published in 2019.

Hilgay railway station opened in 1847 on the Fen line, between Cambridge and King's Lynn. The station closed in 1963 but at one point operated 'Hiams Tramway' which provided a rail link for agricultural produce.

== Geography ==
According to the 2021 census, Hilgay has a population of 1,346 people which shows a decrease from the 1,341 people listed in the 2011 census.

Hilgay is located close to the courses of the River Wissey and River Great Ouse. The A10, between London and King's Lynn, passes through the village.

== All Saints' Church ==
Hilgay's parish church dates from the 18th century and is located within the village on Church Road. All Saints' has been Grade II listed since 1959 and still holds regular Sunday service as part of the Ouse Valley Benefice.

All Saints was heavily restored by George Edmund Street in the 1860s and features a large Victorian marble font.

== Amenities ==
Primary schools at Hilgay and Ten Mile Bank are both run by the Diocese of Ely multi-academy trust. In November 2023, plans were put forward to amalgamate the two schools and close the Ten Mile Bank site, owing to low numbers of pupils.

A Hilgay village sign was erected in 1987. The musical instruments on it are displayed in honour of Hilgay Silver Band, which was still going strong over 100 years after its formation around 1896. Its original members were agricultural workers from the local area. A Manby mortar is also represented. The bridge depicted between the two instruments is Hilgay Old Bridge. The bridge was built in 1899 to transport traffic from the centre of the village over the River Wissey to the north. A small plaque attached to the bottom of the supporting post states the village sign was 'Erected by Hilgay Parish Council 1987'.

Hilgay Parish Council are responsible for the local allotments, cemetery and defibrillator.

== Notable residents ==
- Phineas Fletcher- (1582-1650) poet and Rector of Hilgay from 1621.
- Captain George William Manby- (1765-1854) author and inventor, lived in Hilgay.

== Governance ==
Hilgay is part of the electoral ward of Feltwell for local elections and is part of the district of King's Lynn and West Norfolk

The village's national constituency is South West Norfolk which has been represented by Labour's Terry Jermy MP since 2024.

== War memorial ==
Hilgay War Memorial is a large Latin cross atop a shaft surrounded by a chain-link fence located at the junction of Church Road and High Street which was erected in 1920. The memorial lists the following names for the First World War:

Rank	Name	Unit	Date of death	Burial/Commemoration
Lt.	Michael G. Stocks	2nd Bn., Grenadier Guards	10 Nov. 1914	Zillebeke Churchyard
Lt.	Francis E. Levita	4th Queen's Own Hussars	12 Oct. 1914	Méteren Cemetery
2Lt.	Louis E. J. Maude	11th Bn., K.O.Y.L.I.	1 Jul. 1916	Gordon Dump Cemetery
Sjt.	Walter S. Tuddenham	5th Bn., Norfolk Regiment	19 Apr. 1917	Gaza War Cemetery
LCpl.	John T. Harnwell	1st Bn., Norfolk Regt.	27 Jul. 1916	Thiepval Memorial
Gnr.	Ernest Rolfe	298th Bde., Royal Field Artillery	24 Apr. 1918	Pernois Cemetery
Pnr.	John W. A. Cockerton	Railway Division, Royal Engineers	25 May 1919	Deir al-Balah Cemetery
Pte.	John W. Anderson	2nd Bn., Bedfordshire Regiment	21 Mar. 1918	Pozières Memorial
Pte.	George H. Carnell	2nd Bn., Bedfordshire Regt.	8 May 1918	Tyne Cot
Pte.	Charles W. Eagle	3rd Bn., Bedfordshire Regt.	7 Nov. 1918	All Saints' Churchyard
Pte.	Jabez Stokes	13th Bn., Essex Regiment	13 Nov. 1916	Thiepval Memorial
Pte.	Albert Horton	2nd Bn., Royal Irish Fusiliers	4 May 1915	Menin Gate
Pte.	Ernest R. Burton DCM	1st Bn., Norfolk Regiment	14 Mar. 1915	Spoilbank Cemetery
Pte.	George S. Dearsley	1st Bn., Norfolk Regt.	29 Oct. 1914	Le Touret Memorial
Pte.	Thomas G. Dent	1st Bn., Norfolk Regt.	25 Sep. 1916	Thiepval Memorial
Pte.	William H. Burton	2nd Bn., Norfolk Regt.	15 Apr. 1915	Basra War Cemetery
Pte.	Bertie Hall	5th Bn., Norfolk Regt.	12 Aug. 1915	Helles Memorial
Pte.	Robert Anderson	9th Bn., Norfolk Regt.	20 Nov. 1917	Cambrai Memorial
Pte.	William A. Carnell	9th Bn., Norfolk Regt.	25 Oct. 1918	St Sever Cemetery
Pte.	Percy R. Everitt	9th Bn., Norfolk Regt.	10 Oct. 1915	Lijssenthoek Cemetery
Pte.	William H. Harnwell	9th Bn., Norfolk Regt.	15 Sep. 1916	Thiepval Memorial
Pte.	William Rust	9th Bn., Norfolk Regt.	21 Dec. 1915	New Irish Farm Cemetery
Pte.	Charles H. Green	10th Bn., Norfolk Regt.	20 Mar. 1916	Colchester Cemetery
Pte.	William Rolfe	2nd Bn., Northumberland Fusilers	21 Jul. 1917	Baghdad War Cemetery
Pte.	Charles Clements	2nd Bn., Suffolk Regiment	15 Sep. 1915	Menin Gate
Pte.	Alfred E. Bosworth	7th Bn., Suffolk Regt.	3 Jul. 1916	Blighty Valley Cemetery
Pte.	Albert H. Holman	13th Bn., Tank Corps	25 Apr. 1918	Tyne Cot
Pte.	Walter F. Carnell	3rd Bn., Training Reserve	15 Aug. 1917	All Saints' Churchyard
Pte.	John W. Bland	6th Bn., Queen's Royal Regiment	4 Apr. 1917	Faubourg Cemetery
Pte.	Frank H. Holman	7th Bn., Queen's Royal Regt.	29 Sep. 1916	Connaught Cemetery
Pte.	John W. Holman	1st Bn., Wiltshire Regiment	25 Sep. 1915	Menin Gate
Pte.	James H. Crane	3rd Bn., Worcestershire Regiment	14 Oct. 1916	Railway Dugouts Ground
Rfn.	Walter B. Holman	1st Bn., King's Royal Rifle Corps	28 Nov. 1917	Cambrai Memorial
Rfn.	Alfred Marsh	7th Bn., West Yorkshire Regiment	11 Oct. 1918	Wellington Cemetery

The following names were added after the Second World War:

Rank	Name	Unit	Date of death	Burial/Commemoration
StSgt.	Philip H. Bushell	Electrical and Mechanical Engineers	3 Mar. 1944	Beach Head Cemetery
FSgt.	Thomas A. Betts	No. 461 Squadron RAAF (Sunderland)	12 Aug. 1942	Runnymede Memorial
Cpl.	Walter Clifton	Royal Army Service Corps	4 Jul. 1943	King Tom Cemetery
LAC	William H. Gill	No. 202 Squadron RAF (Sunderland)	5 Jun. 1941	Runnymede Memorial
AS	Donald W. Sparrow	HMS Quebec (shore establishment)	15 Nov. 1942	Chatham Naval Memorial
Gnr.	Alfred D. Howlett	Royal Artillery	30 Apr. 1943	All Saints' Churchyard
Pte.	Oliver V. Howlett	4th Bn., Royal Norfolk Regiment	11 Feb. 1942	Kranji War Cemetery
