= West Dereham =

Village in Norfolk, England

Coordinates: 52°34′49″N 0°26′44″E

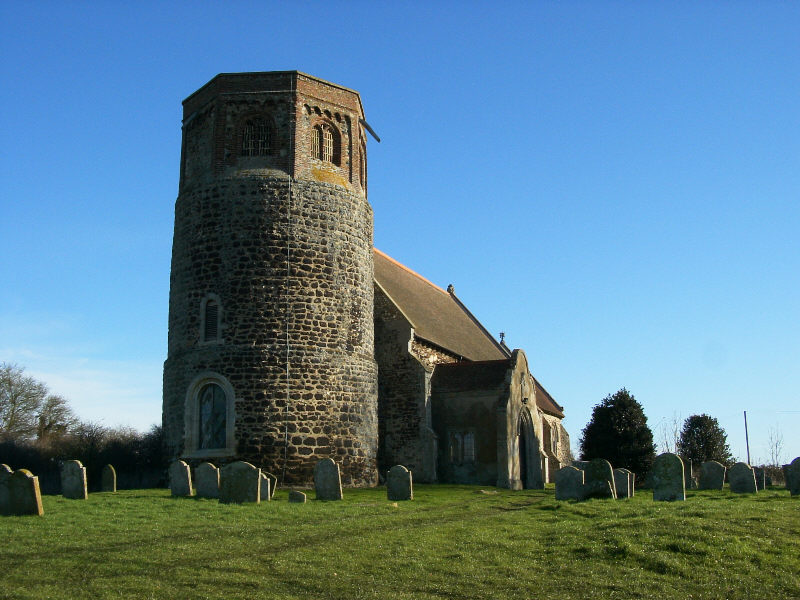
- Church of St Andrew

- Location within Norfolk
- Area: 13.51 km^{2} (5.22 sq mi)
- Population: 450
  - Density: 33/km^{2} (85/sq mi)
- OS grid reference: TF 656 009
- Civil parish: West Dereham
- District: King's Lynn and West Norfolk
- Shire county: Norfolk
- Region: East
- Country: England
- Sovereign state: United Kingdom
- Post town: KING'S LYNN
- Postcode district: PE33
- Police: Norfolk
- Fire: Norfolk
- Ambulance: East of England

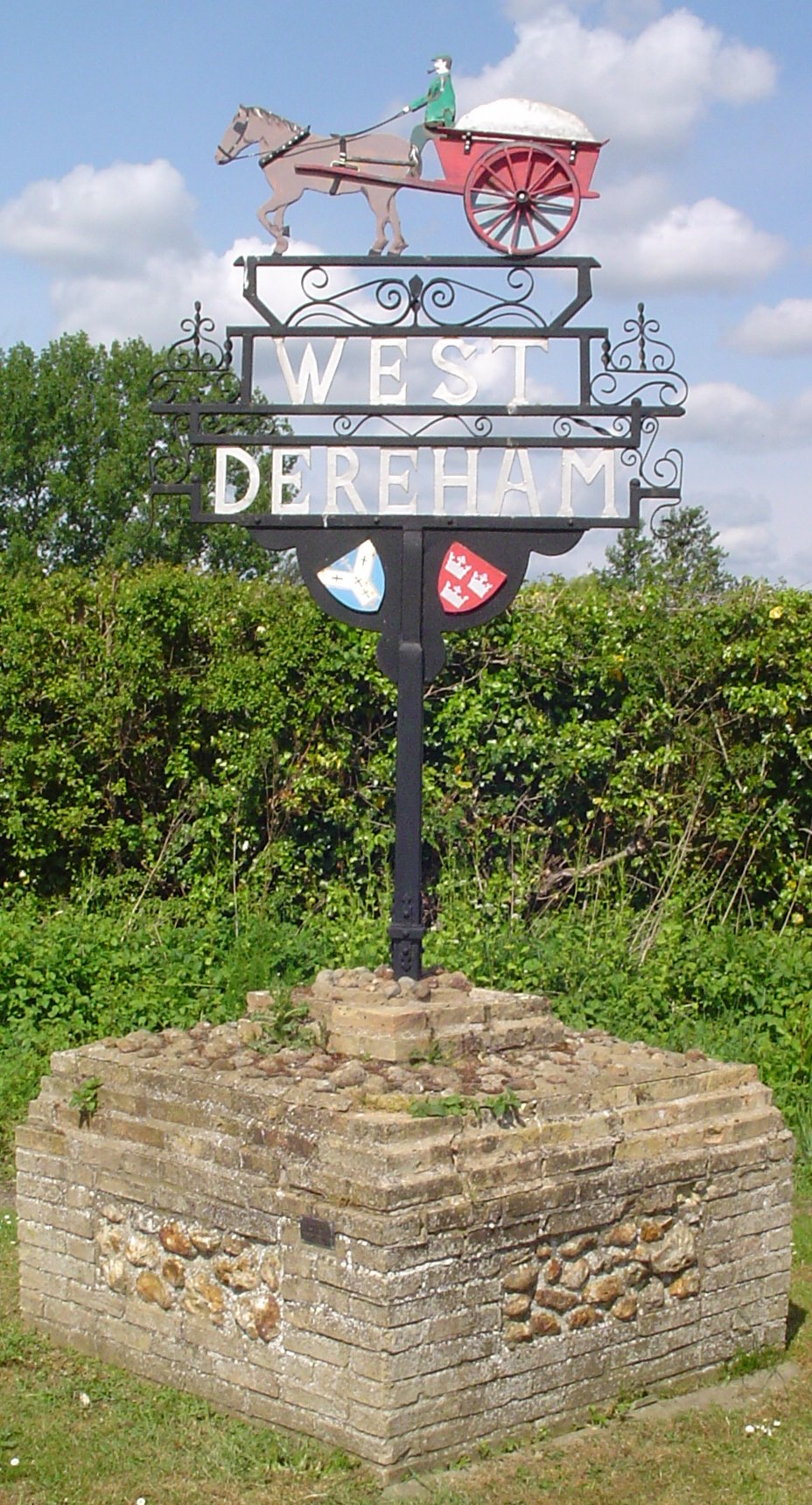
Signpost in West Dereham

West Dereham is a village and civil parish in the English county of Norfolk. It covers an area of 13.51 km^{2} (5.22 sq mi) and had a population of 450 at the 2011 Census. For the purposes of local government, it falls within the district of King's Lynn and West Norfolk.

In local dialect, it may be pronounced "Deerum", or "Dareum" (the emphasis is placed upon the vowel in the first syllable).

== Geographical and historical overview ==
It is situated some 4 miles (6.4 km) east of the town of Downham Market, 12 miles (19 km) south of the larger town of King's Lynn and 37 miles (60 km) west of the city of Norwich. The village should not be confused with the mid-Norfolk town of Dereham (sometimes also called East Dereham), which lies about 25 miles (40 km) away.

St Mary's Abbey, West Dereham, was founded in 1188 by Hubert Walter, Dean of York, at his birthplace.

Between 1882 and 1930 the village was served by Abbey and West Dereham railway station, on the line between Downham Market and Stoke Ferry.

== Church of St Andrew ==
The church of St Andrew is a Grade I listed building. It is one of 124 existing round-tower churches in Norfolk.
