= Denver railway station =

Denver railway station may refer to:

- Union Station (Denver) in Colorado, United States
- Denver railway station (England), in Denver, Norfolk, United Kingdom
