= Hilgay railway station =

Former railway station in England

Coordinates: 52.5396°N 0.3416°E

Hilgay

General information
- Location: Hilgay, Norfolk; England
- Grid reference: TL589961
- Platforms: 2

Other information
- Status: Disused

History
- Original company: Lynn and Ely Railway; East Anglian Railways
- Pre-grouping: Great Eastern Railway
- Post-grouping: London and North Eastern Railway

Key dates
- 25 October 1847: Opened as Hilgay Fen
- 1 October 1896: Renamed Hilgay
- 4 November 1963: Closed to passengers
- 13 July 1964: closed for freight
Location

Hilgay railway station was a station in Hilgay, Norfolk, United Kingdom which is now closed. It was on the Fen Line between King's Lynn and Cambridge. It was closed in 1963 along with nearby Stow Bardolph.

== Hiams Siding and Hiams Tramway ==
One mile south of Hilgay station, Hiams Siding provided an interchange with the narrow gauge Hiams Tramway, an agricultural tramway which extended 3 km west on a zigzag alignment to the west across the fields of the Hiams Estate to Willow Glen Farm.

== Accident ==
- On 1 June 1939, a passenger train, hauled by LNER D16 4-4-0 No. 8783, was in collision with a lorry on an occupation crossing just north of the station and was derailed.

== Route ==
Preceding station	Disused railways	Following station
Littleport; Line and station open	Great Eastern Railway; Fen Line	Ouse Bridge; Line open, station closed
