= Shipdham =

Village in Norfolk, England

Coordinates: 52.628°N 0.894°E

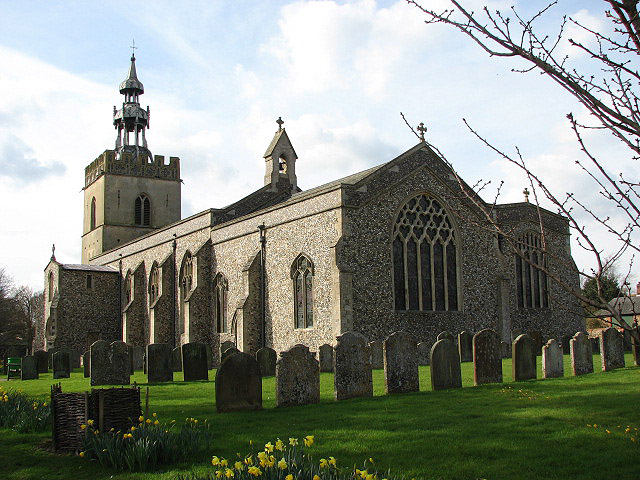
- All Saints Church, Shipdham

- Location within Norfolk
- Area: 18.69 km^{2} (7.22 sq mi)
- Population: 2,057 (2011 census)
  - Density: 110/km^{2} (280/sq mi)
- OS grid reference: TF958073
- Civil parish: Shipdham
- District: Breckland
- Shire county: Norfolk
- Region: East
- Country: England
- Sovereign state: United Kingdom
- Post town: THETFORD
- Postcode district: IP25
- Dialling code: 01362
- Police: Norfolk
- Fire: Norfolk
- Ambulance: East of England
- UK Parliament: Mid Norfolk

Shipdham is a village and civil parish in the Breckland district, in Norfolk, England, approximately 5 miles (8.0 km) south-south-west of Dereham. In the 2001 census the parish had a population of 2,145 in 899 households, falling at the 2011 Census to a population of 2,057 in 899 households. It covers an area of 18.69 km^{2} (7.22 sq mi). It is also known to be the longest village in Norfolk.

The villages name means 'flock of sheep homestead/village'.

The River Yare rises to the east of the village and flows east, while the River Wissey rises to the north and flows westwards.

Shipdham Airfield (formerly RAF Shipdham) is located east of the village.

The village was struck by an F1/T2 tornado on 23 November 1981, as part of the record-breaking nationwide tornado outbreak on that day.

== Bibliography ==
- Fisher, Stuart (2013). British River Navigations. Adlard Coles Nautical. ISBN 978-1-4729-0084-5.
