= Ryston railway station =

Former railway station in England

Coordinates: 52.5728°N 0.3848°E

Ryston
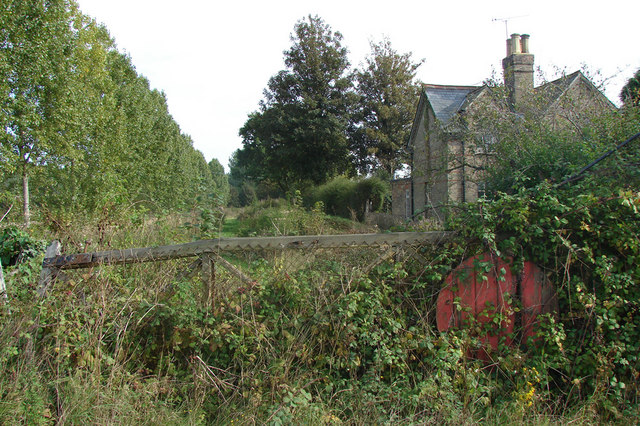

General information
- Location: Fordham, King's Lynn and West Norfolk; England
- Grid reference: TL617999
- Platforms: 1

Other information
- Status: Disused

History
- Original company: Downham and Stoke Ferry Railway
- Pre-grouping: Great Eastern Railway
- Post-grouping: London and North Eastern Railway

Key dates
- 1 August 1882: Station opens
- 22 September 1930: Closed to passengers
- 28 December 1964: closed for freight
Location

Ryston railway station was a railway station serving Fordham, Norfolk. It was on a branch line from Denver.

== History ==
The Downham and Stoke Ferry Railway opened on 1 August 1882, and Ryston station opened with the line. Passengers services were withdrawn on 22 September 1930, and the line closed to all traffic in 1982.

== Route ==
Preceding station	Disused railways	Following station
Abbey and West Dereham; Line and station closed	Great Eastern Railway; Stoke Ferry Branch	Denver; Line and station closed

== See also ==
- Abbey and West Dereham
