= Stoke Ferry Windmill =

Windmill in Stoke Ferry, Norfolk, England

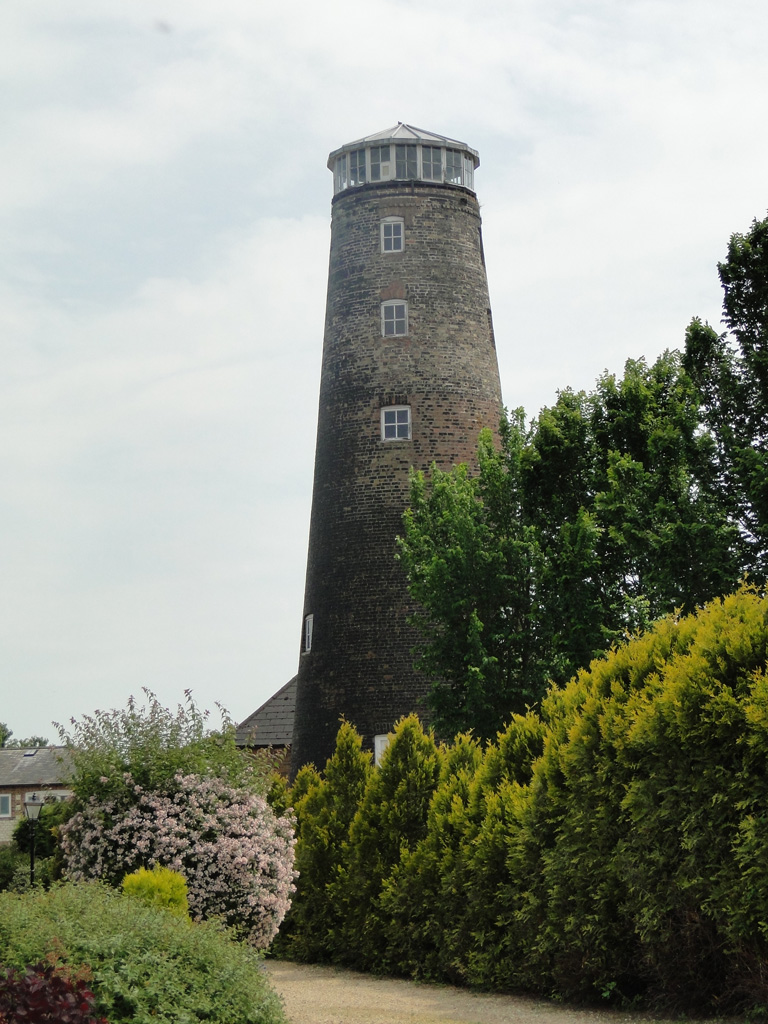
- Stoke Ferry Windmill, June 2015
- Interactive map of Stoke Ferry Windmill

Origin
- Mill name: Stoke Ferry Windmill
- Mill location: Stoke Ferry, Norfolk, United Kingdom
- Grid reference: TF 7014 0049
- Coordinates: 52°34′32″N 0°30′31″E
- Year built: C.1862

Information
- Purpose: Corn mill
- Type: Tower mill
- Storeys: Seven storeys
- No. of sails: Four
- Type of sails: Spring patent sails
- Windshaft: Cast iron
- Winding: Fantail
- Fantail blades: Eight
- Auxiliary power: Portable engine, later steam engine
- No. of pairs of millstones: Three pairs, plus two pairs driven by steam only

Stoke Ferry Windmill is a tower mill in Stoke Ferry, Norfolk, United Kingdom. It was built in the 1860s. The mill worked into the 1930s, then became derelict. It was converted to a restaurant in 1980, and to residential use in 1986.

== History ==
The first mill on the site was a post mill. It was marked on the 1824 Ordnance Survey map of Norfolk. William Pollard was the occupier from 1836 to 1846. He was followed by his son, William Jr., from 1850 to 1868. The post mill was replaced by a tower mill c. 1862.

In May 1873, Pollard defaulted on the mortgage on the tower mill, which was offered for sale by auction. The mill had five floors and a portable engine was used as auxiliary power. Pollard was declared bankrupt in June 1873. He continued as miller until at least 1879, but had left the mill by 1883. John Nix was the miller until about 1900. The mill was damaged in a gale on 24 March 1895.. In 1900, two sails from Bentley Mill, South Weald, Essex were erected on the mill. The work was carried out by Hunts, millwrights of Soham, Cambridgeshire. The mill was probably raised by two floors at this time (1895-1900). Ted Sharp was the miller from 1904 to 1936, latterly by steam. The mill had lost two sails and its fantail by June 1936. One of the sails fell off that November, falling on the Mill House and injuring the occupants.

An attempt to demolish the mill in the 1950s was unsuccessful. The mill was sold in 1980 to Roger Wright, who converted it to a restaurant. The mill was listed Grade II on 11 December 1985. Use as a restaurant ended in 1986 and the mill was then converted to residential use.

== Description ==
Stoke Ferry Windmill is a seven storey tower mill, originally built as a five storey mill. The tower is about 58 feet (18 m) tall. It had an ogee cap which was 17 feet 0 inches (5.18 m) diameter. Four double patent sails were carried on a cast iron windshaft. One pair had twelve bays of three shutters, the other pair had eleven bays of three shutters. The mill was winded by and eight-bladed fantail. Three pairs of millstones were driven underdrift. A steam mill attached to the mill drove two pairs of millstones. The mill retains the oak upright shaft with cast iron wallower, crown wheel, great spur wheel and stone nuts.
