= Phineas Fletcher =

English poet (1582–1650)

Phineas Fletcher (8 April 1582 – 13 December 1650) was an English poet, elder son of Giles Fletcher, and brother of Giles the Younger. He was born at Cranbrook, Kent, and was baptized on 8 April 1582.

== Life ==
He was admitted a scholar of Eton, and in 1600 entered King's College, Cambridge. He graduated B.A. in 1604, and M.A. in 1608, and was one of the contributors to Sorrow's Joy (1603). His pastoral drama, Sicelides, or Piscatory, was written (1614) for performance before James I, but only produced after the king's departure at King's College.

He had been ordained priest and before 1611 became a fellow of his college, but he left Cambridge before 1616, apparently because certain emoluments were refused him. He became chaplain to Sir Henry Willoughby, who presented him in 1621 to the rectory of Hilgay, Norfolk, where he married and spent the rest of his life.

== Works ==
Phineas Fletcher wrote throughout his life. At his death he left behind a body of literature larger than that of his Renaissance contemporaries: in fact, his work rivals in size the canons of Spenser and Milton. The collected works of Phineas Fletcher include three volumes of religious prose, an epic, an epyllion, a drama, several medium-length verse narratives, pastoral eclogues, verse epistles, epithalamia, hymns, psalms, translations, various songs, occasional pieces, lyrics, and devotional poems. In scope, variety, and quality, his writings are second to none of that age.

In 1627 he published Locustae, vel Pietas Jesuitica (The Locusts or Apollyonists), two parallel poems in Latin and English furiously attacking the Jesuits. Alexander Balloch Grosart saw in this work one of the sources of Milton's conception of Satan. Next year appeared an erotic poem, Brittain's Ida, with Edmund Spenser's name on the title page. It is certainly not by Spenser, and is printed by Grosart with the works of Phineas Fletcher. Sicelides was printed in 1631.

In 1632 appeared two theological prose treatises, The Way to Blessedness and Joy in Tribulation, and in 1633 his magnum opus, The Purple Island. The book was dedicated to his friend Edward Benlowes, and included his Piscatorie Eclogues and other Poetical Miscellanies. He died in 1650 in Hilgay, Norfolk, and his will was proved by his widow on 13 December that year.

The Purple Island, or the Isle of Man, is a poem in twelve cantos describing allegorically the physiological structure of the human body and the mind of man. The intellectual qualities are personified, while the veins are rivers, the bones the mountains of the island, the whole analogy being worked out with great ingenuity. The manner of Spenser is preserved throughout, but without the digressions of The Faerie Queene. The Piscatory Eclogues are pastorals, the characters of which are represented as fisher boys on the banks of the Cam, and are interesting for the light they cast on the biography of the poet himself (Thyrsil) and his father (Thelgon).

... the influence of Phineas Fletcher and his brother Giles is far greater than has generally been realized. Together they founded a distinct school of poetry which outlived the chilling influence of the Restoration.....In Milton's day, most of the Cantabrigians, Crashaw, Joseph Beaumont, Thomas Robinson, and others wrote more or less in their manner. In his boyhood Milton was enlisted in the School of the Fletchers and their influence is traceable even in his mature poems. Any study of Spenserian material in Milton, should include an elaborate examination of the work of the School of the Fletchers. — H. E. Cory, 1912.

A complete edition of Phineas Fletcher's works (4 vols.) was privately printed by Alexander Balloch Grosart (Fuller Worthies Library, 1869).

The standard work available in print remains Frederick S. Boas, The poetical Works of Giles and Phineas Fletcher (Cambridge University Press 1908).

In Dinah Craik's 1856 novel, John Halifax, Gentleman, the fictional characters Abel Fletcher, a tanner, and his son Phineas are descendants of 'Phineas Fletcher, who wrote the "Purple Island"', in which descent they recognise they 'originally came of a good stock'.
