= Stoke Ferry =

Village in Norfolk, England

Coordinates: 52.5667°N 0.5167°E

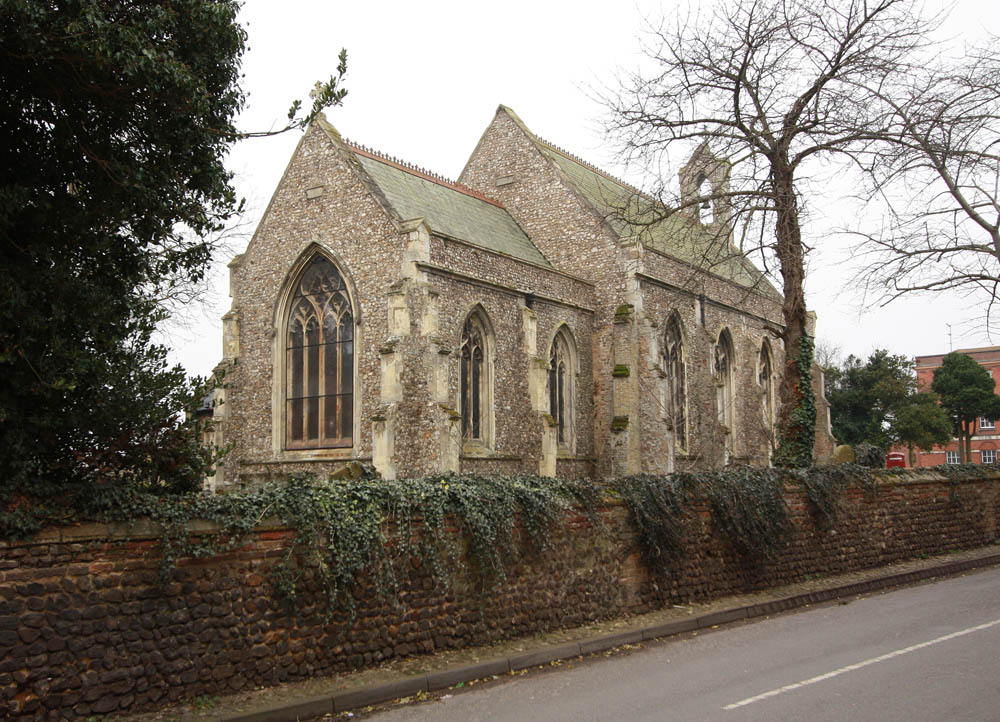
- All Saints, Stoke Ferry

- Location within Norfolk
- Area: 9.15 km^{2} (3.53 sq mi)
- Population: 1,020
  - Density: 111/km^{2} (290/sq mi)
- OS grid reference: TL706995
- Civil parish: Stoke Ferry
- District: King's Lynn and West Norfolk
- Shire county: Norfolk
- Region: East
- Country: England
- Sovereign state: United Kingdom
- Post town: KING'S LYNN
- Postcode district: PE33
- Dialling code: 01366
- Police: Norfolk
- Fire: Norfolk
- Ambulance: East of England
- UK Parliament: South West Norfolk

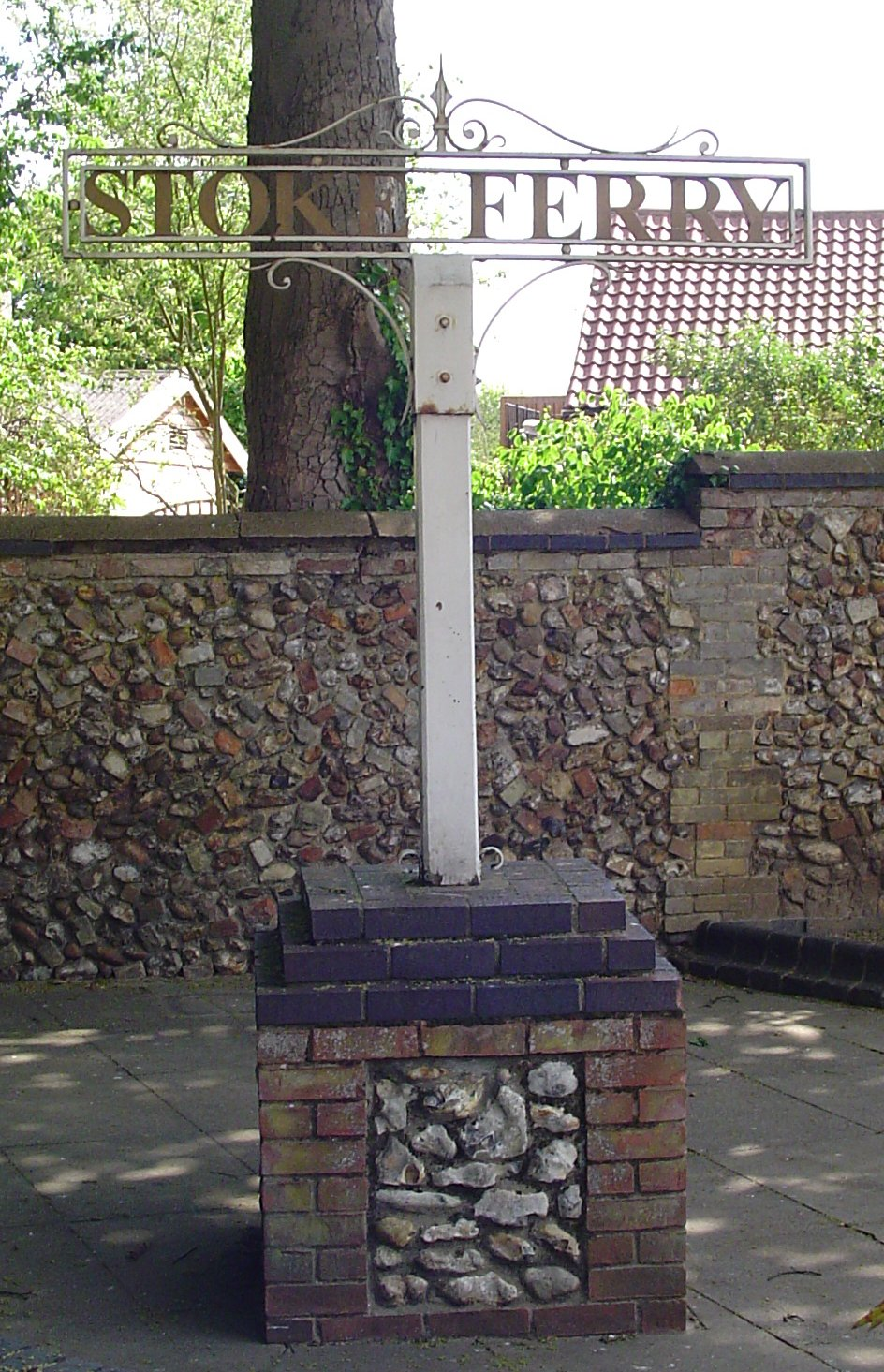
Village sign in Stoke Ferry

Stoke Ferry is a village and civil parish in the English county of Norfolk, 6.5 miles southeast of Downham Market. The village lies on the River Wissey, previously known as the River Stoke.

== The village ==
Stoke Ferry covers an area of 9.15 km^{2} (3.53 sq mi) and had a population of 896 in 358 households as of the 2001 UK Census, the population increasing to 1,020 at the 2011 UK Census. For the purposes of local government, it falls within the district of King's Lynn and West Norfolk.

All Saints' Church, a Grade II listed building, was rebuilt by William Donthorn. It is no longer used for church services and was owned by Kit Hesketh-Harvey until his death in 2023. Stoke Ferry Windmill was built in the 1860s. It worked until the 1930s, then became derelict. It was converted to a restaurant in 1980, then to residential use in 1986, retaining most of its machinery.

The village has many small businesses such as two takeaway shops, a hairdresser, wood yard, DIY hardware shop & metalworks workshop, funeral directors, and a corner shop. There is also a thriving community-owned pub, The Blue Bell Pub-Cafe which was bought by the local community on 30 June 2021 and, after extensive refurbishment reopened on 4 June 2022. Stoke Ferry Hall is a Grade II* listed building.

== Historical references ==
In 1805, Stoke Ferry is described as being "distant from London 88 miles 2 furlongs; on the Stoke river, which is navigable to this place from the Ouse. Fair, December 6...on the right, 5 m is the seat of Robert Wilson, esq. Inn, Crown."

The village was serving as a post town (under the name "Stoke") by 1775; the name had been changed to "Stoke Ferry" by 1816. A type of postmark known as an undated circle was issued to the village in 1828, and it had a Penny Post service, under Brandon (in Suffolk), between 1835 and 1840.

It once had its own railway station, the terminus of the Downham and Stoke Ferry Railway, a branch from the main line between Cambridge and King's Lynn. It closed to passengers in 1930 but remained open for goods until 1965. From the early 2000s it was used as a wood yard which moved to its new home on Boughton Road North. The site of the old station is currently being developed as a housing complex which will retain its Grade II listed buildings.

There is still a blacksmith's shop, Thomas B. Bonnett, in the heart of the village that has been trading over 100 years. As well as ironwork, they also sell hardware, plumbing supplies, timber and steel. As well as a hairdresser's, there are takeaways and many other small businesses that help make Stoke Ferry such a vibrant village.
