= South Pickenham =

Village in Norfolk, England

Coordinates: 52.6039°N 0.7419°E

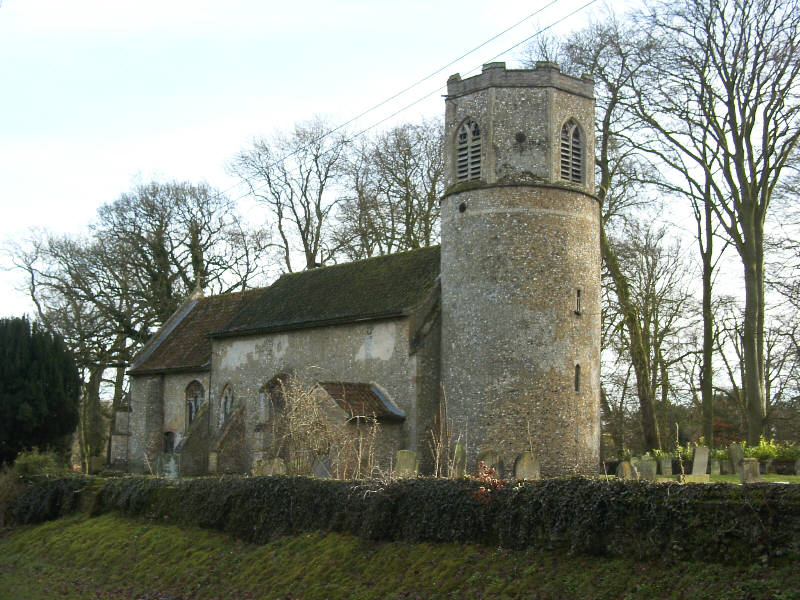
- All Saints CofE church

- Location within Norfolk
- Area: 7.58 km^{2} (2.93 sq mi)
- Population: 101 (2001 census)
  - Density: 13/km^{2} (34/sq mi)
- OS grid reference: TF8504
- Civil parish: South Pickenham
- District: Breckland
- Shire county: Norfolk
- Region: East
- Country: England
- Sovereign state: United Kingdom
- Post town: Swaffham
- Postcode district: PE37
- Dialling code: 01760
- Police: Norfolk
- Fire: Norfolk
- Ambulance: East of England
- UK Parliament: South West Norfolk

South Pickenham is a small village and civil parish in the Breckland district of Norfolk, England. It has an area of 758 hectares (2.93 square miles) and it had a population of 101 in 40 households at the 2001 census. This had dropped to an estimated 85 as at the 2007/2008 Breckland yearbook. The Parish Council Tax (Band D) 1 April 2007 was £28.75. It was once in the Hundred of South Greenhoe. At the 2011 Census the village population had again fallen to less than 100 and was included in the civil parish of Cockley Cley.

== Geographical overview ==
The village is about 4 miles south east of Swaffham and 2 miles from its sister village North Pickenham. The village is centered on the Grade II listed Pickenham Hall, still the landlord for much of the village, which is owned by the Arumugam Packiri family. The original hall was designed by William Donthorne but between 1902 and 1905 architect Robert Weir Schultz extensively rebuilt and enlarged the hall, incorporating the previous house, in the style of the Arts and Crafts movement.

The Stanford Training Area lies to the south of the parish.

The historic church of All Saints is one of 124 existing round-tower churches in Norfolk, 185 nationwide and five within a 9-mile radius.

The restored church of Saint Mary's at Houghton on the Hill is nearby. Historically part of North Pickenham since 1725, a Pastoral Order was raised transferring it to South Pickenham as a Chapel of Ease in 1992.

The 46-mile Peddars Way runs to the east, within the parish boundaries, aside the course of the River Wissey.

South Pickenham Estate Co. Ltd., a large arable and livestock farming company, is based in the village.
