= Abbey and West Dereham railway station =

Disused railway station in Norfolk, England

Coordinates: 52.57035°N 0.44350°E

Abbey and West Dereham
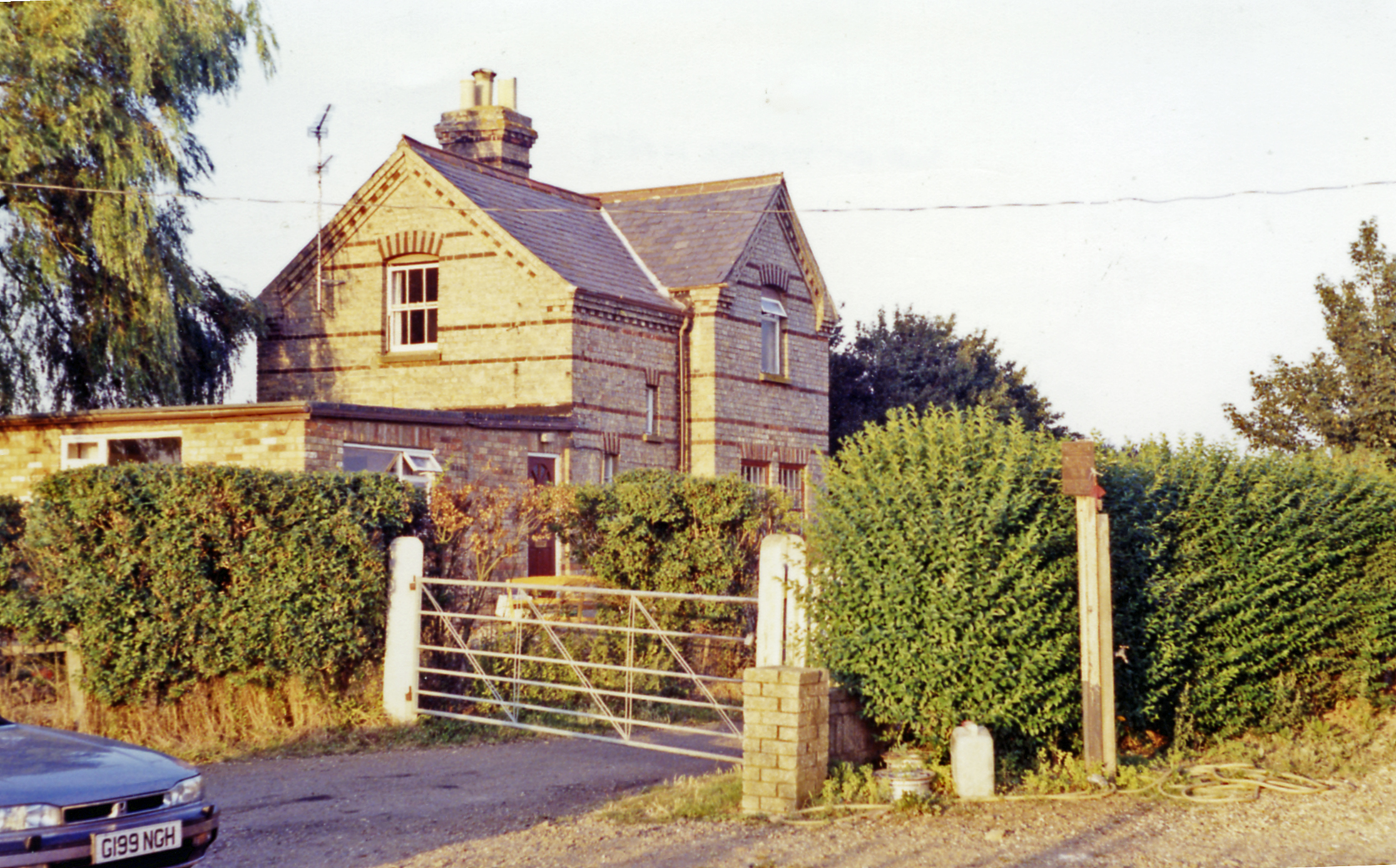
- Remains of the station seen in 1991

General information
- Location: West Dereham, King's Lynn and West Norfolk; England
- Grid reference: TL656997
- Platforms: 1

Other information
- Status: Disused

History
- Opened: 1 August 1882
- Original company: Downham and Stoke Ferry Railway
- Pre-grouping: Great Eastern Railway
- Post-grouping: London and North Eastern Railway

Key dates
- 1 January 1886: Renamed Abbey for West Dereham
- 1 July 1923: Renamed Abbey and West Dereham
- 22 September 1930: Station closed to passengers
- 31 January 1966: closed for freight traffic
Location

Abbey and West Dereham railway station was a railway station on the line between Downham Market and Stoke Ferry. It served the village of West Dereham and the nearby St Mary's Abbey, in Norfolk, England. It was located south of the village on what is currently Station Road.

== History ==
Opened as Abbey by the Downham and Stoke Ferry Railway on 1 August 1882, the line was run from the beginning by the Great Eastern Railway (GER). The station was renamed twice: on 1 January 1886 it became Abbey for West Dereham; and in 1923 as a result of the Grouping the GER became part of the London and North Eastern Railway and the new owners renamed the station Abbey and West Dereham, this occurring on 1 July 1923. The station closed to passenger traffic on 22 September 1930.

The line became part of the Eastern Region of British Railways on nationalisation in 1948.

== Notes ==
Preceding station	Disused railways	Following station
Stoke Ferry; Line and station closed	Great Eastern Railway; Stoke Ferry Branch	Ryston; Line and station closed
