= Houghton on the Hill, Norfolk =

Coordinates: 52.6138°N 0.7584°E

Houghton on the Hill
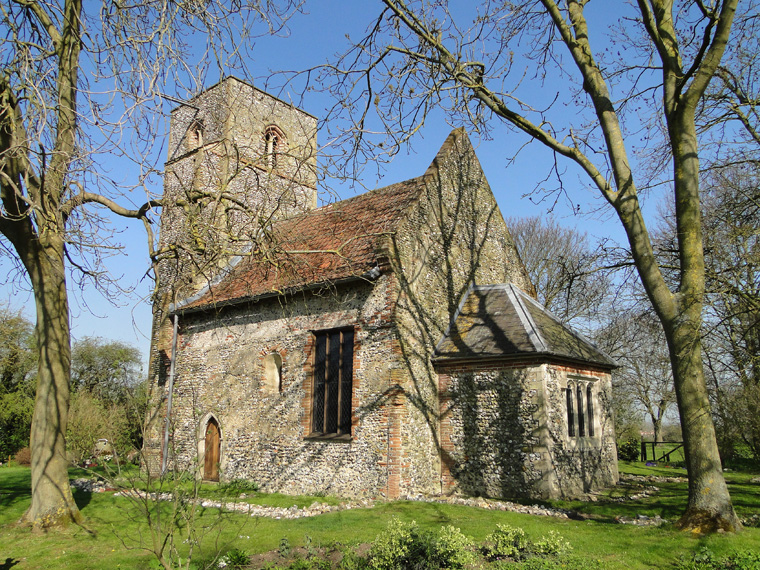
- St Mary's Church, Houghton on the Hill

- Location within Norfolk
- Population: 0
- OS grid reference: TF868053
- Civil parish: North Pickenham
- District: Breckland
- Shire county: Norfolk
- Region: East
- Country: England
- Sovereign state: United Kingdom
- Post town: Swaffham
- Postcode district: PE37
- Dialling code: 01760
- Police: Norfolk
- Fire: Norfolk
- Ambulance: East of England
- UK Parliament: South West Norfolk

Houghton on the Hill is a deserted medieval village and former civil parish, now in the parish of North Pickenham in the Breckland district of Norfolk, England, notable for its Grade I listed church. The only surviving buildings are a farm and St Mary's Church. The church was rescued in the 1990s after being left in a ruinous state. During the restoration some wall paintings dating from about the time of the Domesday Book were discovered; these are the earliest-known large-system wall paintings in the country. The restoration was driven by the efforts of one man, Bob Davey MBE. The church is supported by a charitable trust 'The Friends of St Mary's', who open the church on a regular basis and provide guided tours. In 1931 the parish had a population of 21.

== History ==
There is evidence of habitation in this area going back to prehistoric times, with flint tools and a Bronze Age spearhead being found in local fields. The village was located close to the Peddars Way Roman road, and a large villa and, possibly, a temple were located nearby.

The village is mentioned in the Domesday Book, being owned by Reynold, son of Ivo. A man called Herlwin held land in Houghton from Reynold. The present nave of the church was built at this time, and the paintings inside probably date from this period.

Francis White's History, Gazetteer and Directory of Norfolk of 1854, states that the parish consisted of 10 houses, with 50 residents and 600 acres of land. During the First World War, the church was damaged when a Zeppelin dropped a bomb close to the churchyard. The church was abandoned in 1937. The last derelict cottages were demolished in the 1990s.

On 1 April 1935 the parish was abolished and merged with North Pickenham.

Bob Davey of North Pickenham started the rescuing of the ivy-covered roofless ruin in 1992. He received the MBE in the 2006 Birthday Honours "for services to Church Restoration in Norfolk". Davey died on 4 March 2021, aged 91 and his life and the restoration of the church were discussed on BBC Radio 4's obituary programme Last Word in April 2021.

== St Mary's Church wall paintings ==
Extensive polychrome wall paintings were noticed during restoration in 1996, and it soon became evident that they were of major significance. Romanesque wall paintings are very rare, and certain aspects of the iconography, particularly the quatrefoil cross on God's knee on the east wall, have given rise to a date of around 1090, or late 11th century.

The best-preserved scheme is on the east wall, which depicts the Last Judgment. Over the arch of the chancel, we see the Trinity, comprising Father, Son, and Holy Spirit, set within a triple mandorla. Beneath and to the left are the souls of the saved, and to the right, probably the souls of the damned (one seemingly wearing a crown).

Further down and to the left are a well-preserved set of figures holding scrolls, which might be construed as apostles or saints, and to the right a badly damaged matching group of figures that some have interpreted as demons. Beneath and to the left is a scene depicting the Raising of the Dead.

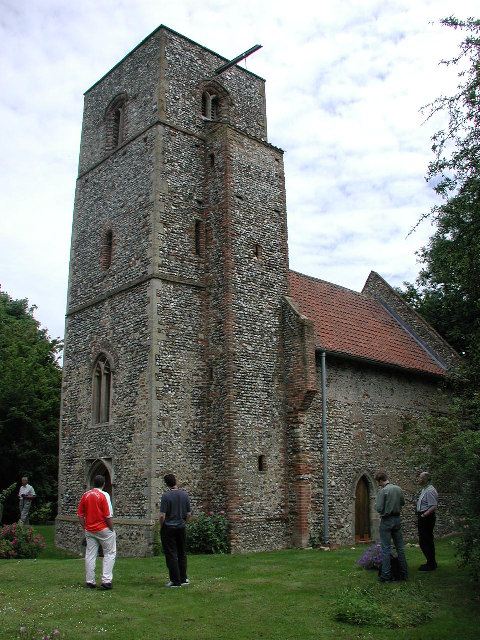
St Mary's Church

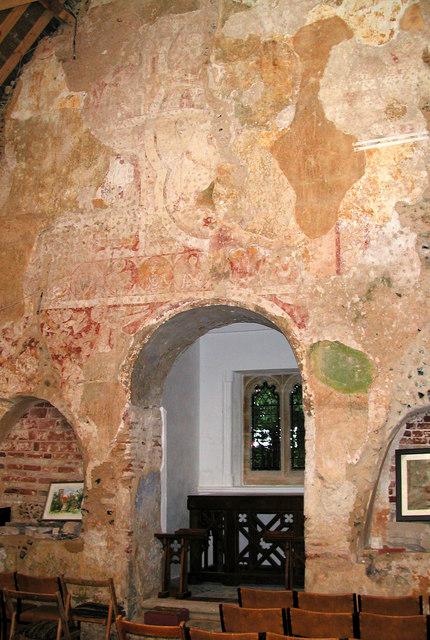
11th-century wall painting in St Mary's Church
