= River Wissey =

River in Norfolk, England

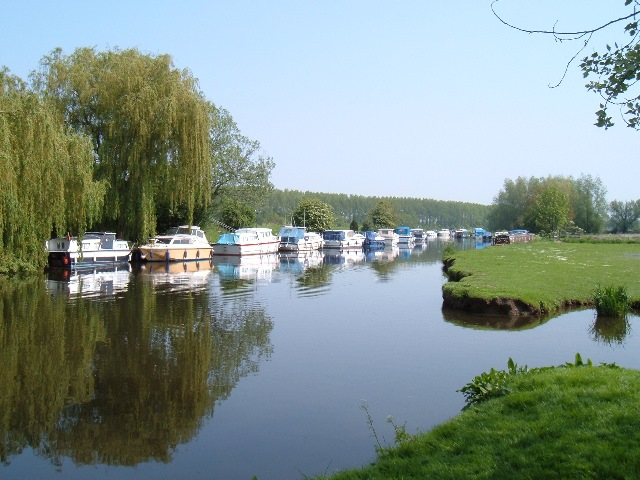
- The river at Hilgay

Location
- Country: England
- County: Norfolk

Physical characteristics
- Source
  - location: Shipdham
  - coordinates: 52.6381°N 0.8900°E
  - elevation: 70 m (230 ft)
- Mouth: River Great Ouse
  - location: Fordham
  - coordinates: 52.5661°N 0.3436°E
  - elevation: 4 m (13 ft)
- Length: 31 mi (50 km)

The River Wissey is a river in Norfolk, eastern England. It is a chalk river which rises near Bradenham, and flows for nearly 31 miles (50 km) to join the River Great Ouse at Fordham. The lower 11.2 miles (18.0 km) are navigable. The upper reaches are notable for a number of buildings of historic interest, which are close to the banks. The river passes through the parkland of the Arts and Crafts Pickenham Hall, and further downstream, flows through the Army's Stanford Training Area (STANTA), which was created in 1942 by evacuating six villages. The water provided power for at least two mills, at Hilborough and Northwold. At Whittington, the river becomes navigable, and is surrounded by fenland. A number of pumping stations pump water from drainage ditches into the higher river channel.

Although navigation is known to have taken place since at least the time of the Domesday Book, there is less documentary evidence than for other neighbouring rivers, as there was no centre of population at the head of the navigation. A sugar-beet factory was built on the banks in 1925 at Wissington, which could only be accessed by river or railway, and started a period of relative prosperity, which ended in 1943, when the first road to reach the factory was built. All use of the river is now by pleasure craft.

== Course ==
The river is a tributary of the Great Ouse, rising at Shipdham, near East Bradenham in Norfolk, and flowing for nearly 31 miles (50 km) through Necton, North Pickenham, South Pickenham, Great Cressingham, Ickburgh, Northwold and Stoke Ferry before joining the Great Ouse south of Downham Market, specifically in the small parish of Fordham. Its course has altered, as it originally flowed to Wisbech, which derives its name from the river, and historically, it has also been known as the River Stoke or Stoke River. The source, to the north of Shipdham, is close to the 260-foot (79 m) contour, and is close to the source of the River Yare, which flows in the opposite direction.

=== Upper reaches ===
To the south of the stream is Manor Farm, a Grade II listed building dating from the sixteenth century, although extended and refaced over the following 200 years. Much of the original timber frame has been replaced by brick. Associated with the farm are some ancient fishponds. The course continues to the west, passing the Grade I listed Huntingfield Hall farmhouse, again dating from the sixteenth century, but with nineteenth-century alterations, and then flowing along the northern edge of Bradenham. The parish church is separated from the main centre of population by the river. It is a medieval building, constructed of flint, ashlar masonry and brick, much of it dating from the fourteenth century, though parts are a little earlier. To the west of the village is a small sewage treatment plant, located on the south bank, after which it passes to the north of Holme Hale and to the south of Necton. It turns to the south to pass under Station Road at Erneford Bridge, close to Erneford House, which is constructed of colourwashed bricks with a pantile roof and dates from 1700. It passes under a disused railway bridge, and continues to the east of North Pickenham, where the parish church of St Andrew was substantially rebuilt in 1863, but retains its earlier tower and north transept.

At South Pickenham, the river passes through the parkland of Pickenham Hall, which covers an area of 139 acres (56 ha). It is marked on Faden's county map of 1797, and was extended in the mid-nineteenth century. Much of it is grassland with ancient oaks. 11 acres (4.5 ha) are laid out as gardens and pleasure grounds, leading down to the river, which has been widened at this point. A rustic oak bridge dating from the early 1900s links the gardens to the park. The hall itself was built between 1902 and 1905 by the Arts and Crafts architect Robert Weir Schultz for the banker G W Taylor. The previous house, dating from around 1830, could not be preserved, as it was found to be unstable during the rebuild. At Great Cressingham, the former manor house sits on the east bank. It is Grade I listed, and includes moulded brick monograms belonging to John and Elizabeth Jenny, who bought the house in 1542. Turning briefly to the south-west, Home Lane crosses the river by a ford at Hilborough. To the south of the hamlet is Hilborough Mill and the miller's house, dating from 1819. Most of the machinery is still in place, although the paddles are missing from the cast iron waterwheel.

Further south is Bodney Hall farmhouse, which dates from the sixteenth century, with alterations made in the eighteenth and nineteenth centuries. There are ancient fish ponds marked on the Ordnance Survey map. The river then passes through a danger area, which is used by the army for training purposes. During the Second World War, the area was the location of RAF Bodney. The river passes Langford Church, a Grade I listed medieval building containing a monument to Sir Nicholas Garrard, which was designed by Christopher Horsnaile senior in baroque style in 1727. The windows are covered with corrugated iron sheets, because the building is within the Army's Stanford Training Area. A tributary, which rises near Merton and flows through a large lake called Stanford Water, joins the Wissey from the east. The nearby village of Stanford was one of six evacuated to make way for the Stanford Training Area in 1942.

Beyond the junction, the river turns to the west, and passes gravel pits near Ickburgh. Near the bridge under the A1065 road is Bridge House, remodelled as a pair of semi-detached houses in the nineteenth century, but still containing parts of the original leper chapel dating from the thirteenth century. Passing to the north of Mundford, the channel turns to the north-west, and passes between the lakes of Didlington Hall on the north bank and those formed by sand and gravel extraction to the south. Two sluices mark the location of Northwold watermill, which was demolished some time after 1938. The River Gadder, which rises to the north-east of Cockley Cley, and its distributary, the Oxborough Drain, enter the Wissey on its north bank. To the north of Whittington, there is a disused pumping station by the junction with the Stringside Drain, and the river becomes navigable. It is now just 7 feet (2 m) above sea level.

=== Lower reaches ===
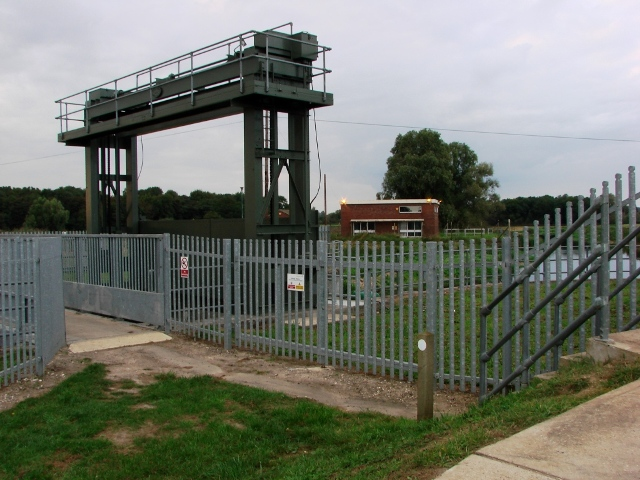
The sluice which controls flow from the River Wissey into the cut-off channel, with a pumping station in the background

The Stringside Drain flows into the river from the north, just upstream from the A134 bridge at Whittington. This forms the present head of navigation, as boats up to at least 60 feet (18 m) can use the junction to turn round. Below the bridge, a wharf served the maltings owned by Whitbread in the 19th century. A footpath runs along the northern bank of the river, and is in good condition from Whittington to Wissington. Stoke Ferry, with its fine windmill sits close to the northern bank of the river, protected from it by flood banks. Below the village is the junction with the Cut-off Channel, a 28-mile (45 km) drain running from Barton Mills on the River Lark to Denver along the south-eastern edge of the Fens, which was constructed in the 1950s and 1960s. During times of flood it carries the head waters of the River Lark, the Little Ouse and the River Wissey to Denver Sluice on the River Great Ouse. A guillotine sluice isolates the main channel of the river when flood water is diverted into the Cut-off Channel, and the river then passes over the channel in a concrete aqueduct.

Close to the junction is a pumping station which pumps water from the river to the Stoke Ferry drinking water treatment works. The United Kingdom's first two-way enclosed fish pass was installed in 2012 to enable fish to negotiate the flood defenses, and reach spawning grounds further upstream. It was funded by the Environment Agency, while Anglian Water supply the energy to operate it from the treatment works. It is similar in design to many in the Netherlands, but the siphon has been modified to enable a wider variety of fish species to use it.

Methwold Lode flows in from the south, and the river is then constrained by wide flood banks on both sides of the river. Wissington bridge is relatively new, as there was no road access to the sugar-beet factory below it when it was built in 1925. The road to the factory has since been bypassed, with the newer bridge providing more headroom than the old. At Hilgay, the Cut-off Channel passes very close to the river, with Snowre Hall, a 15th-century building containing some of the earliest domestic brickwork in England on its northern bank.

Hilgay, the largest village on the river, sits on a raised isle, some 66 feet (20 m) above the surrounding fenland. Its elevation has become more pronounced as the draining of the fenland has caused the ground to shrink. It was notable in Saxon and early Norman times for the large numbers of fish and eels found there. Hilgay Old Bridge still crosses the river, but the newer A10 bypass also crosses just below it. The final landmark before the junction with the Great Ouse is the railway bridge carrying the Ely to King's Lynn line over the river.

The river below Whittington passes through fenland, and is embanked to separate it from the lower-lying land on either side. Drainage of the land is managed by internal drainage boards (IDBs), and there are several pumping stations which pump water from drainage ditches into the river channel. Land to the north of the river from Stringside Drain to its mouth is managed by the Stoke Ferry Internal Drainage Board. To the south, the area from Whittington to the Methwold Drain is managed by the Northwold IDB, and from there to the mouth is managed by the Southery and District IDB. They control a much larger area, and the southern border of the IDB is formed by the River Little Ouse.

== History ==
The "ey" part of the name means "river" thus the name is tautological. Documentary evidence for the history of the river is scarce, compared to the neighbouring River Lark and River Little Ouse, both of which had a sizeable town at the head of navigation, whereas the Wissey does not. The Wissey is mentioned in the Domesday Book of 1086, when it was navigable from "Oxenburgh" to King's Lynn and Cambridge, and there are remains of a medieval settlement near the river at Oxborough Ferry. It was mentioned in 1575, when the Commissioners of Sewers, meeting at King's Lynn, ruled that it should be cleared and made wider between Stokebridge and Whittington, and that the bridge at Stoke Ferry should be repaired. This bridge was contentious, as the Abbot of Ely lost the ferry tolls when it was built. He destroyed it, to protect his income, but was required to re-instate it by the Hundred Court.

There were wharfs at Oxborough Hithe in the 1750s, handling trade in coal and grain, and evidence of boathouses 1-mile (1.6 km) further upstream at Northwold. The only Act of Parliament which covered the Wissey was passed in 1814, and this was more concerned with drainage than with navigation. Commissioners were appointed, who had responsibility for drainage in the parishes of Northwold, Stoke Ferry, Wereham, West Dereham and Wretton. They were empowered to widen the river between Hilgay Creek's End and Stoke Bridge, with the cost being borne by local landowners. They could also levy tolls on anyone using the north bank, although they could only use such tolls to repair the bank.

Trade continued to the wharf at Oxborough Hithe and to another at Stoke Ferry until at least 1858, and may have continued for years afterwards, as the railway from Denver did not arrive until 1882. A barge called Wissey was operated by J Coston from Hilgay, which was known to have reached Cambridge in 1896 and 1898. In the 1930s, A Jackson was trading corn from Stoke Ferry, while one of the busiest times for the river was between 1925 and 1943. Wissington sugar-beet factory was opened in 1925, and until 1941 could only be reached by river or by the Wissington Light Railway, which crossed the river at the western edge of the factory. The site was then requisitioned by the Ministry of Agriculture who used Italian prisoners of war to refurbish the railway and construct roads to the factory. Three tugs, named Hilgay, Littleport and Wissington were used to pull a fleet of 24 steel barges, which were used to take the sugar to King's Lynn during the winter months and to bring coal in the reverse direction during the summer.

== Points of interest ==
Point	Coordinates (Links to map resources)	OS Grid Ref	Notes
Mouth (Jn with Great Ouse)	52.5662°N 0.3438°E	TL589990	
Wissington Railway Bridge	52.5537°N 0.4451°E	TL658979	disused - by Sugar Factory
Connection to Cut Off Channel	52.5614°N 0.5109°E	TL702989	
Stringside Drain	52.5669°N 0.5353°E	TL719995	Head of navigation
Northwold Bridge	52.5396°N 0.6095°E	TL770967	
A1065 Mundford Bridge	52.5180°N 0.6627°E	TL807944	
Great Cressingham Bridge	52.5821°N 0.7247°E	TF846017	
Source near Bradenham	52.6382°N 0.8896°E	TF956084	

== Water quality ==
The Environment Agency measure the water quality of the river systems in England. Each is given an overall ecological status, which may be one of five levels: high, good, moderate, poor and bad. There are several components that are used to determine this, including biological status, which looks at the quantity and varieties of invertebrates, angiosperms and fish. Chemical status, which compares the concentrations of various chemicals against known safe concentrations, is rated good or fail.

The water quality of the River Wissey was as follows in 2019.

Section	Ecological Status	Chemical Status	Length	Catchment	Channel
Wissey - Upper	Moderate	Fail	13.2 miles (21.2 km)	33.85 square miles (87.7 km^{2})	
Wissey - Lower	Moderate	Fail	16.1 miles (25.9 km)	29.37 square miles (76.1 km^{2})	heavily modified

The reasons for the water quality being less than good include discharge from sewage treatment works, runoff of nutrients from agricultural land, and physical modification of the channel, which inhibits the free movement of fish in particular. Like most rivers in the UK, the chemical status changed from good to fail in 2019, due to the presence of polybrominated diphenyl ethers (PBDE) and perfluorooctane sulphonate (PFOS), neither of which had previously been included in the assessment.

== Bibliography ==
- Blair, Andrew Hunter (2006). The River Great Ouse and tributaries. Imray Laurie Norie and Wilson. ISBN 978-0-85288-943-5.
- Boyes, John; Russell, Ronald (1977). The Canals of Eastern England. David and Charles. ISBN 978-0-7153-7415-3.
- Fisher, Stuart (2013). British River Navigations. Adlard Coles Nautical. ISBN 978-1-4729-0084-5.
- Thirsk, Joan (2002). Rural England. Oxford University Press. ISBN 978-0-19-860619-2.
