= Spoilbank Cemetery =

WWI CWGC cemetery in Ypres, Belgium

Spoilbank
- Commonwealth War Graves Commission
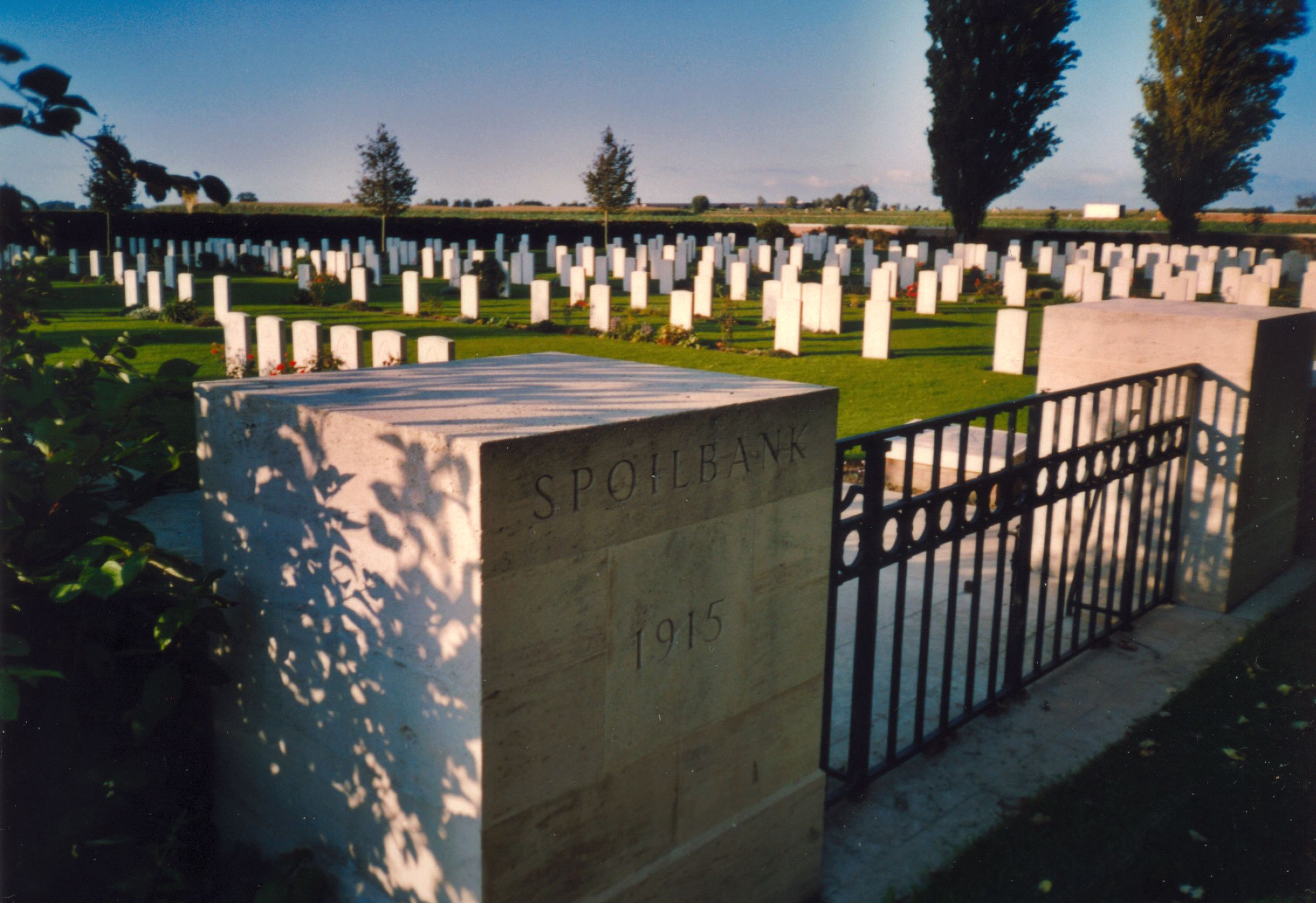
- Used for those deceased 1915–1918
- Established: February 1915
- Location: 50°49′13″N 2°53′57″E near Ypres, West Flanders, Belgium
- Designed by: Sir Edwin Lutyens
- Total burials: 520
- Unknowns: 125

Burials by nation
- Allied Powers: United Kingdom: 426; Canada: 16; Australia: 67

Burials by war
- World War I: 520

Spoilbank is a Commonwealth War Graves Commission burial ground for the dead of the First World War located in the Ypres Salient on the Western Front.

The cemetery grounds were assigned to the United Kingdom in perpetuity by the King of Belgium in recognition of the sacrifices made by the British Empire in the defence and liberation of Belgium during the war.

== Foundation ==
Commonwealth troops began using the site as a cemetery in February 1915. The cemetery is named after the bank of spoil left over from the digging of the Ypres-Comines canal, which was strategically important in the relatively flat Flemish countryside.

The cemetery is also referred to as Gordon Terrace Cemetery and Chester Farm Lower Cemetery.

There are special markers for eleven soldiers (ten British and one Australian) who are known or believed to be buried in the cemetery but whose actual plot was lost or destroyed. These stones usually have the Rudyard Kipling-derived footnote "Their glory shall not be blotted out".

The cemetery was designed by Sir Edwin Lutyens upon enlargement after the war when graves were concentrated from the nearby battlefields.

== Notable graves ==
The cemetery has the graves of two brothers, George and John Keating, who were both killed on 17 February 1915. They are buried next to each other.

The cemetery also has the grave of Private R H Reeves, who was killed on 8 October 1915 by a grenade. He was 15 years old.
