= Downham and Stoke Ferry Railway =

Branch line in western Norfolk, England

Overview
- Locale: King's Lynn and West Norfolk
- Dates of operation: 1882–1898
- Successor: Great Eastern Railway

Technical
- Track gauge: 4 ft 8 1/2 in (1,435 mm) standard gauge
- Length: 7 miles (11 km)

The Downham and Stoke Ferry Railway was a branch line in western Norfolk, England.

== History ==
Downham and Stoke Ferry Railway Act 1879
- Act of Parliament
- Parliament of the United Kingdom
- Long title: An Act for authorising the construction of a Railway from the Ely and Lynn Branch of the Great Eastern Railway to Stoke Ferry; and for other purposes.
- Citation: 42 & 43 Vict. c. clxxxviii

Dates
- Royal assent: 24 July 1879

Text of statute as originally enacted

The Downham and Stoke Ferry Railway (D&SF) was just over 7 miles (11 km) long. It was authorised by the Downham and Stoke Ferry Railway Act 1879 (42 & 43 Vict. c. clxxxviii) on 24 July 1879, and opened on 1 August 1882, being worked by the Great Eastern Railway (GER). It ran from a junction with the GER at Denver (to the south of Downham), to a terminus at Stoke Ferry. There were two intermediate stations: Ryston and Abbey (latterly known as Abbey and West Dereham).

== Ownership changes ==
On 6 August 1897 the Great Eastern Railway (General Powers) Act 1897 (60 & 61 Vict. c. xcv) authorised the GER to absorb the D&SF, which they did on 1 January 1898. Being part of the GER, the line passed to the London and North Eastern Railway (LNER) at the Grouping on 1 January 1923.

When the railways were nationalised in 1948 operation of the line became the responsibility of British Railways Eastern Region.

== Closure ==
The LNER withdrew the passenger service on 22 September 1930.

Freight services were withdrawn from:

- Denver (13 July 1964)
- Ryston (28 December 1964)
- Abbey (31 January 1966) and
- Stoke Ferry (19 July 1965).

The section between Abbey and Stoke Ferry was abandoned in 1965 but traffic continued to the Wissington Light Railway until 1982.

== Wissington Light Railway ==
At Abbey and West Dereham, a privately owned line, the Wissington Light Railway, branched off. It opened c. 1905, mostly closed in 1957, and finally closed in 1982.
