= North Pickenham =

Village in Norfolk, England

Coordinates: 52.6275°N 0.753611°E

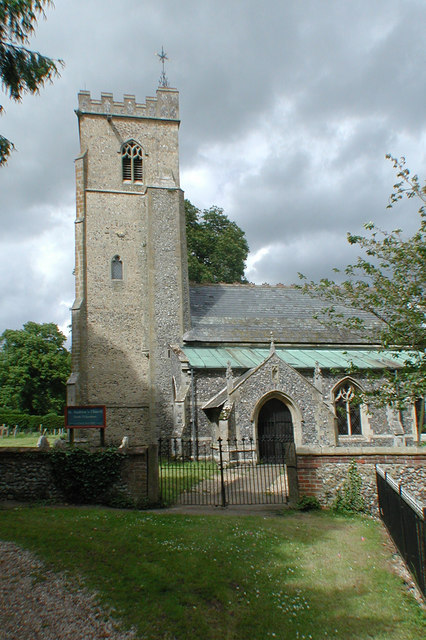
- St Andrew's church

- Location within Norfolk
- Area: 10.15 km^{2} (3.92 sq mi)
- Population: 472 UK census 2011
  - Density: 47/km^{2} (120/sq mi)
- OS grid reference: TF8646606864
- District: Breckland
- Shire county: Norfolk
- Region: East
- Country: England
- Sovereign state: United Kingdom
- Post town: SWAFFHAM
- Postcode district: PE37
- Dialling code: 01760
- Police: Norfolk
- Fire: Norfolk
- Ambulance: East of England
- UK Parliament: South West Norfolk

North Pickenham is a village in the Breckland district of mid-Norfolk, East Anglia, England. It lies three miles from the Georgian market town of Swaffham.

At the 2001 census it had a population of 500 and an area of 1,015 hectares (3.92 square miles) reducing to 472 at the 2011 Census. Norfolk (pop. 832,400) has about one-thirtieth of the population density of Central London, the tenth lowest density county in the country, with 38% of the county's population living in the three major urban areas of Norwich (194,200), Great Yarmouth (66,400) and King's Lynn (40,700).

== Geographical overview ==
The River Wissey cuts through the village at Houghton Lane bridge, following the course of Meadow Lane, close to the river's source at Bradenham. Its sister village South Pickenham is two miles away through pretty, narrow country lanes.

North Pickenham has a Parish Council Tax (Band D).

== History ==
The village is after its Saxon leader Pinca, Pica or maybe Piccea with ham meaning homestead, it became a pagan Anglo Saxon settlement in the 5th century AD. It remained part of a Saxon kingdom until the Norman Conquest in 1066 when it became part of the honour of the Earl of Richmond, Yorkshire. The old village sign showed a Saxon (left) and a Norman (right) warrior (see Great Britain in the Middle Ages) with Richmond Castle and the river Wissey in the background; The sign was designed by Ben Ripper, a local historian, and carved by Steve Eggleton. A new village statue by Tom Yorke replaced the deteriorating old sign and was unveiled by the incumbent MP George Freeman on 22 October 2010. Due to an insect infestation the statue was removed in 2018 and in 2020 the old village sign was refurbished and re-erected in its place.

It was once in the Hundred of South Greenhoe.

The former Royal Air Force station, RAF North Pickenham, was located nearby hosting American B-24 Liberator bombers during World War II. In the late 1950s and early 1960s three PGM-17 Thor nuclear missiles were located here with early cases of CND acts of civil disobedience. The airbase is now the site of a turkey farm owned by Bernard Matthews, a karting circuit and a ten-turbine wind farm run by North Pickenham Wind Farm LLP. A 'stealth blade', which is trying to be invisible to aviation radar, was tested on one of the turbines here in October 2009. In February 2009 Bernard Matthews detailed plans to put two turbines at the airfield site, an independent development to the eight turbines that were already there.

== Amenities ==
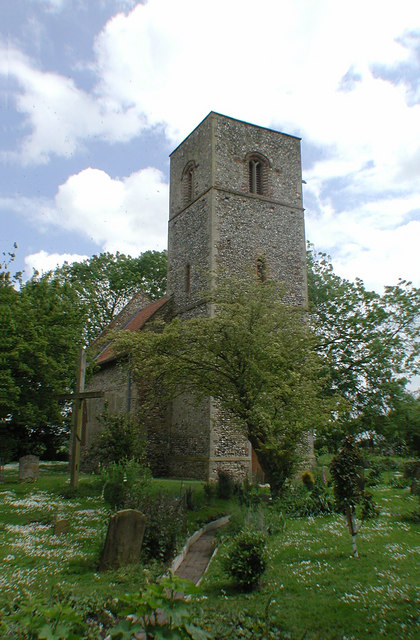
St Mary's Church, Houghton on the Hill

North Pickenham had a school with its own wind turbine. It is now closed and became a community hub. Its namesake, at the centre of the village, is St Andrew's church in the Benefice of Necton

Adjacent to the church was a freehouse pub called the Blue Lion which, with recent surveys and listed buildings visits, suggest it dates from the late 18th century with documented licensees from the mid-19th century. It closed in 2024 and is now a detached house.

The lost village of Houghton on the Hill is in the civil parish. Houghton includes the restored church of St Mary's, with its outstanding 11th century wall paintings, instigated by Bob Davey MBE.

The 46-mile Peddars Way footpath runs through the village, 19 miles from its south eastern start in Suffolk. The Peddars Way starts at Knettishall Heath Country Park and follows the route of a Roman road to Holme-next-the-Sea on the Norfolk coast north of Hunstanton. At Holme the Peddars Way meets the Norfolk Coast Path as it runs east along the north Norfolk coast, designated as an Area of Outstanding Natural Beauty, to the Victorian seaside resort of Cromer.

The annual local village show was reinstated in 2007. It raises funds for the church and highlights the growing and making skills of local residents.
