= Fordham, Norfolk =

Village in Norfolk, England

Coordinates: 52.571238°N 0.383148°E

Fordham
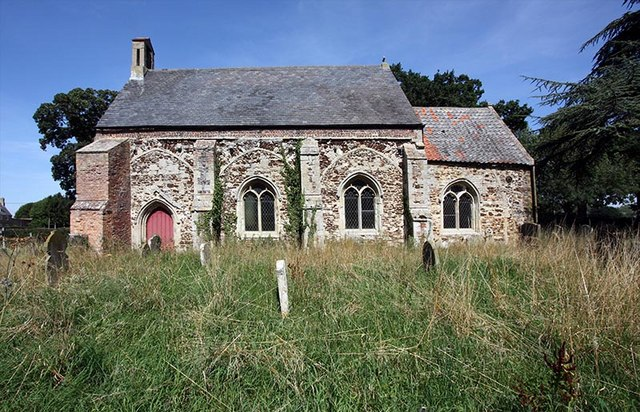
- St Mary's Church, Fordham

- Location within Norfolk
- Area: 3.45 sq mi (8.9 km^{2})
- OS grid reference: TL616997
  - London: 76 miles (122 km)
- Civil parish: Fordham
- District: King's Lynn and West Norfolk
- Shire county: Norfolk
- Region: East
- Country: England
- Sovereign state: United Kingdom
- Post town: DOWNHAM MARKET
- Postcode district: PE38
- Dialling code: 01366
- Police: Norfolk
- Fire: Norfolk
- Ambulance: East of England
- UK Parliament: South West Norfolk

Fordham is a small village and civil parish in the English county of Norfolk.

Fordham is located 2.2 miles (3.5 km) south of Downham Market and 39 miles (63 km) west of Norwich, located along the A10 between London and King's Lynn and close to the confluence of the River Wissey and River Great Ouse.

== History ==
Fordham's name is of Anglo-Saxon origin and derives from the Old English for a village or homestead close to a ford, likely across the River Great Ouse.

The parish of Fordham has been the site of discovery for several significant Bronze Age artefacts, including a hammer, a decorated sword and a socketed axehead.

In the Domesday Book, Fordham is listed as a settlement of 22 households in the hundred of Clackclose. In 1086, the village was divided between the East Anglian estates of St Benedict's Abbey, Ralph Baynard, Henry de Ferrers, Reginald, son of Ivo and the Abbey of St Etheldreda, Ely.

Snore Hall dates from the Medieval period and was originally built as a timber-framed, fortified manor-house. The building that stands today was built in early sixteenth century, with extensions made in the eighteenth and twentieth centuries. The hall has a good example of a sixteenth-century priest hole, and was the site of a council convened by King Charles I during the English Civil War.

There were once three pubs in Fordham including the Green Dragon which suffered from a severe fire in 1803 which consumed a nearby granary as well.

During the Second World War, several defences were built in Fordham to protect the railway line against a possible German invasion.

== Geography ==
Due to the small size of Fordham's population, it is not listed separately in the census.

Fordham is located along the A10, between London and King's Lynn, and close to the confluence of the River Wissey and River Great Ouse.

== St Mary's Church ==
Fordham's parish church is dedicated to Saint Mary and dates from the late-Thirteenth Century. St. Mary's is located on a small track off the A10 and has been Grade II listed since 1951.

St. Mary's suffered from a major collapse in the Eighteenth Century which caused significant damage to the nave and tower. Today, the church is in the care of the Friends of Friendless Churchless but is closed for repairs.

== Governance ==
Fordham is part of the electoral ward of Denver for local elections and is part of the district of King's Lynn and West Norfolk

The village's national constituency is South West Norfolk which has been represented by Labour's Terry Jermy MP since 2024.

== War Memorial ==
Fordham shares a war memorial with the nearby villages of Denver, Ryston and Bexwell. The memorial takes the form of a stone cross atop an octagonal plinth, located on Denver's village green. The memorial lists the following men who died during the First World War:

| Rank | Name | Unit | Date of death | Burial/Commemoration |
|---|---|---|---|---|
| Sgt. | Harry Dungay | 1st Bn., Lincolnshire Regiment | 1 Nov. 1914 | Menin Gate |
| LCpl. | Robert Dungay | 7th Bn., Bedfordshire Regiment | 16 Nov. 1916 | Regina Trench Cemetery |
| Pte. | Herbert Fuller | 1st Bn., Cambridgeshire Regiment | 22 Mar. 1918 | Pozières Memorial |
| Pte. | Alfred Symonds | 1st Bn., Cambridgeshire Regt. | 17 Feb. 1917 | Wimereux Cemetery |
| Pte. | Frank Plaice | 17th Bn., Liverpool Regiment | 12 Oct. 1916 | Thiepval Memorial |
| Pte. | Harold S. Tingay | 1/8th Bn., West Yorkshire Regiment | 20 Oct. 1917 | Wimereux Cemetery |
| Pte. | James Pope | 1/5th Bn., York and Lancaster Regiment | 12 Apr. 1918 | Cabaret Rouge Cemetery |

The following names were added following the Second World War:

| Rank | Name | Unit | Date of death | Burial/Commemoration |
|---|---|---|---|---|
| Spr. | Leslie Holman | 251 Coy., Royal Engineers | 9 Nov. 1943 | Kranji War Memorial |
