= Connaught Cemetery =

WWI CWGC cemetery in Somme, France

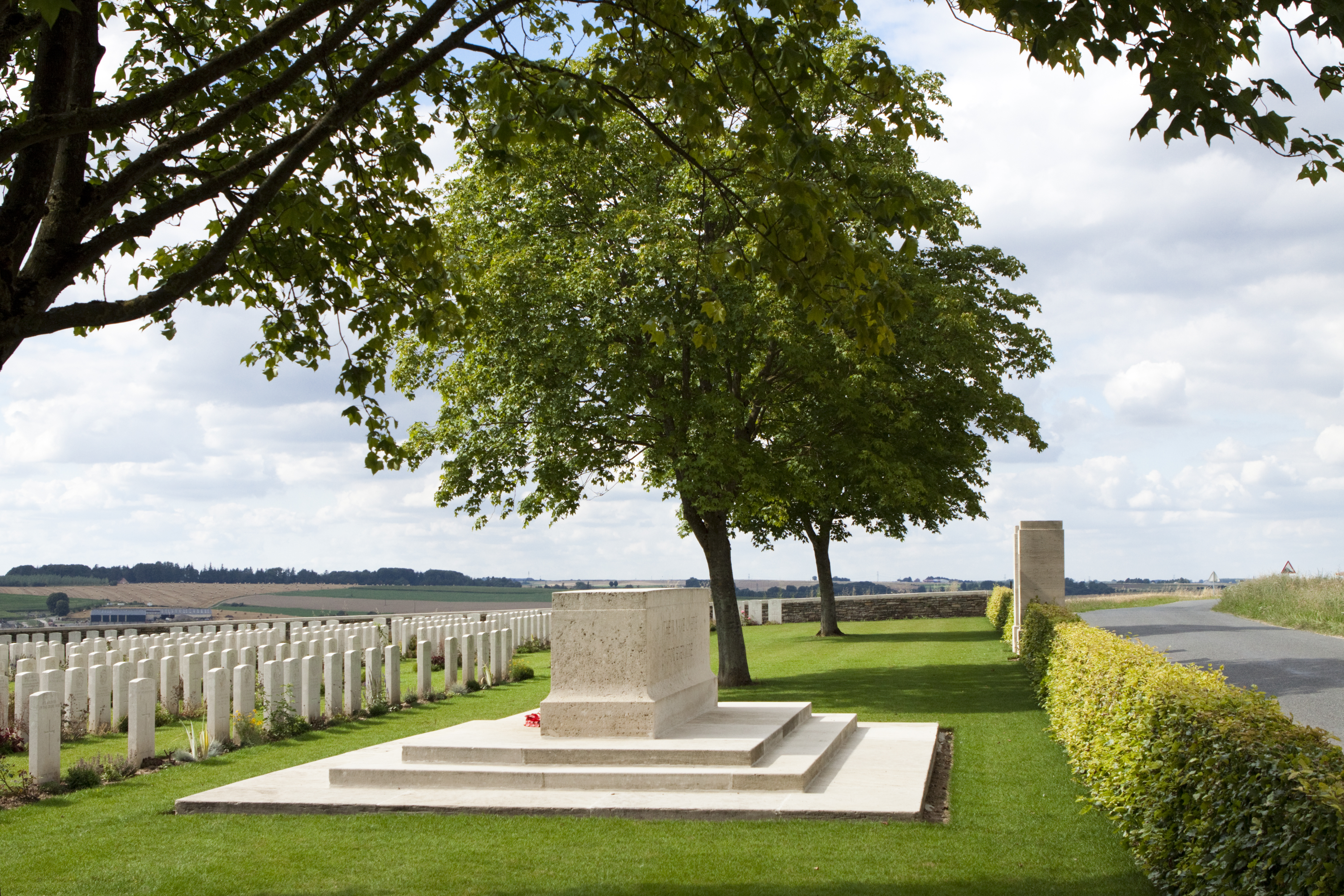

Details
- Established: Autumn 1916
- Location: Thiepval, Somme, France
- Country: British and Commonwealth
- Coordinates: 50°03′32″N 2°40′50″E
- Type: Military
- Owned by: Commonwealth War Graves Commission
- No. of graves: 1268 total, 646 identified
- Website: cwgc.org
- Find a Grave: Connaught Cemetery

The Connaught Cemetery is a cemetery located in the Somme region of France commemorating British and Commonwealth soldiers who fought in the Battle of the Somme in World War I. The cemetery contains mainly those who died near the village of Thiepval from Autumn 1916 until the end of the war in November 1918 with a brief exception between March and August 1918.

== Location ==
The cemetery is located approximately 1 kilometer along the D73 road out of Thiepval, which is approximately 8 kilometers northeast of Albert, France. Geographically, it is located at the edge of Thiepval Wood near a formation known as Ulster Tower. Nearby is the Mill Road Cemetery, also from World War I.

=== Statistics ===
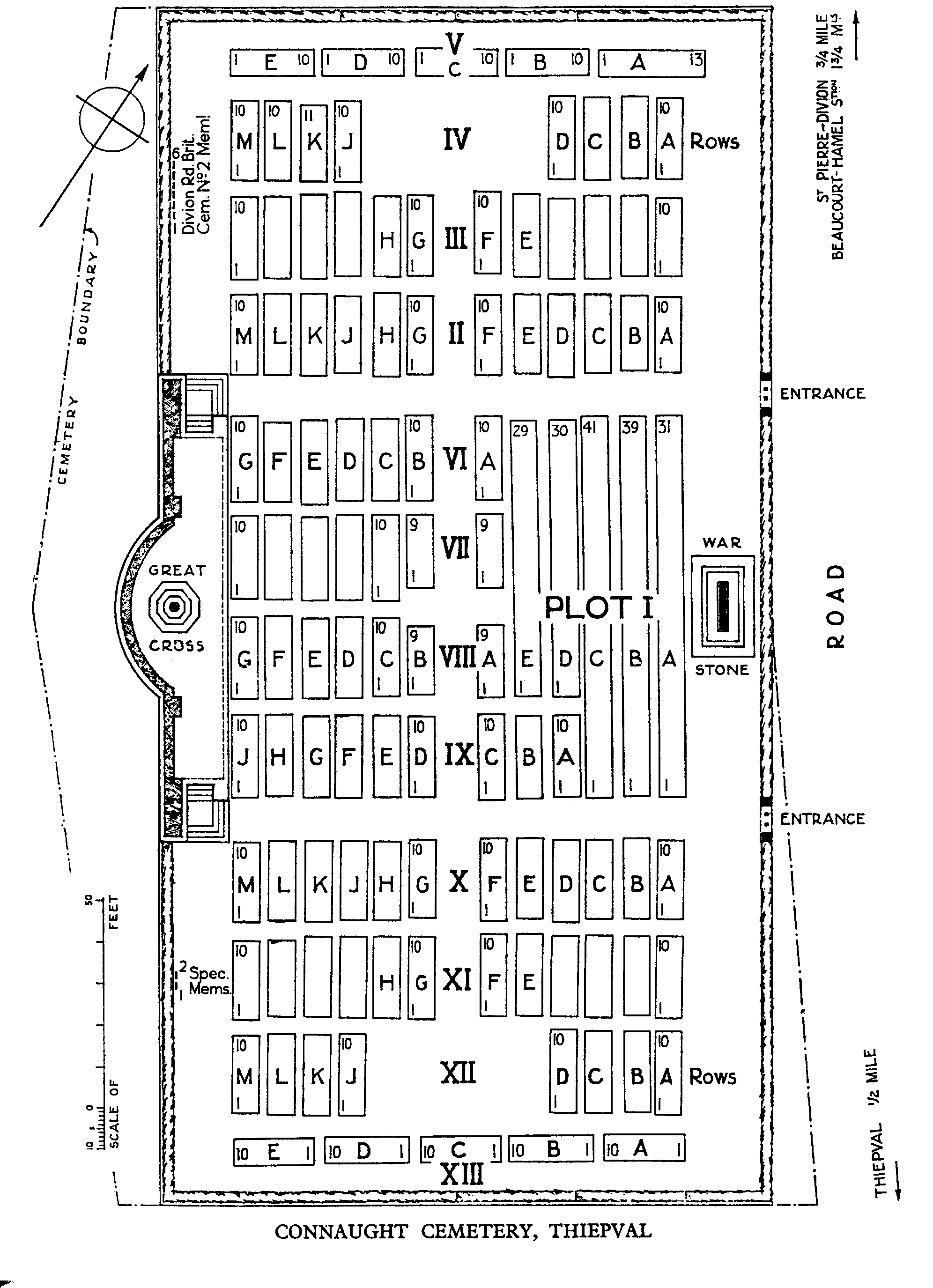
Connaught Cemetery Plan

There are now 1,268 Commonwealth soldiers buried in the cemetery, of which 646 are identified. All of the identified casualties are British.

Burials by Unit
Unit	#	Unit	#
Royal Inniskilling Fusiliers	84	Duke of Wellington (West Riding Regiment)	54
Lancashire Fusiliers	54	Royal Irish Rifles	40
Notts. & Derbyshire Regiment	32	West Yorkshire Regiment	28
Gloucestershire Regiment	26	Black Watch	24
North Staffordshire Regiment	17	Royal Navy Division - infantry	16
Royal West Kent Regiment	16	South Lancashire Regiment	15
Queen's - Royal West Surrey Regiment	14	Bedfordshire Regiment	12
Cambridgeshire Regiment	11	Machine Gun Corps	11
Royal Sussex Regiment	11	East Surrey Regiment	10
Royal Engineers	10	Cheshire Regiment	9
Dorsetshire Regiment	9	Northumberland Fusiliers	9
Hertfordshire Regiment	8	Middlesex Regiment	8
Hampshire Regiment	7	Loyal North Lancs Regiment	7
South Staffordshire Regiment	7	East Yorkshire Regiment	6
King's Royal Rifle Corps	6	Royal Warwickshire	6
Norfolk Regiment	5	Rifle Brigade	5
Royal Fusiliers	5	Buffs - East Kent Regiment	4
Leicestershire Regiment	4	Royal Field Artillery	4
East Lancashire Regiment	3	King's Own Royal Lancaster Regiment	3
King's Own Yorkshire Light Infantry	3	Worcestershire Regiment	3
York & Lancaster Regiment	3	Royal Army Service Corps	2
Suffolk Regiment	2	Welsh Regiment	2
Border Regiment	1	Monmouthshire Regiment	1
Northamptonshire Regiment	1	Royal Dragoons, attached South Lancashire Regiment	1
Wiltshire Regiment	1		
