= Denver railway station (England) =

Disused railway station in England

Coordinates: 52.582°N 0.356°E

Denver
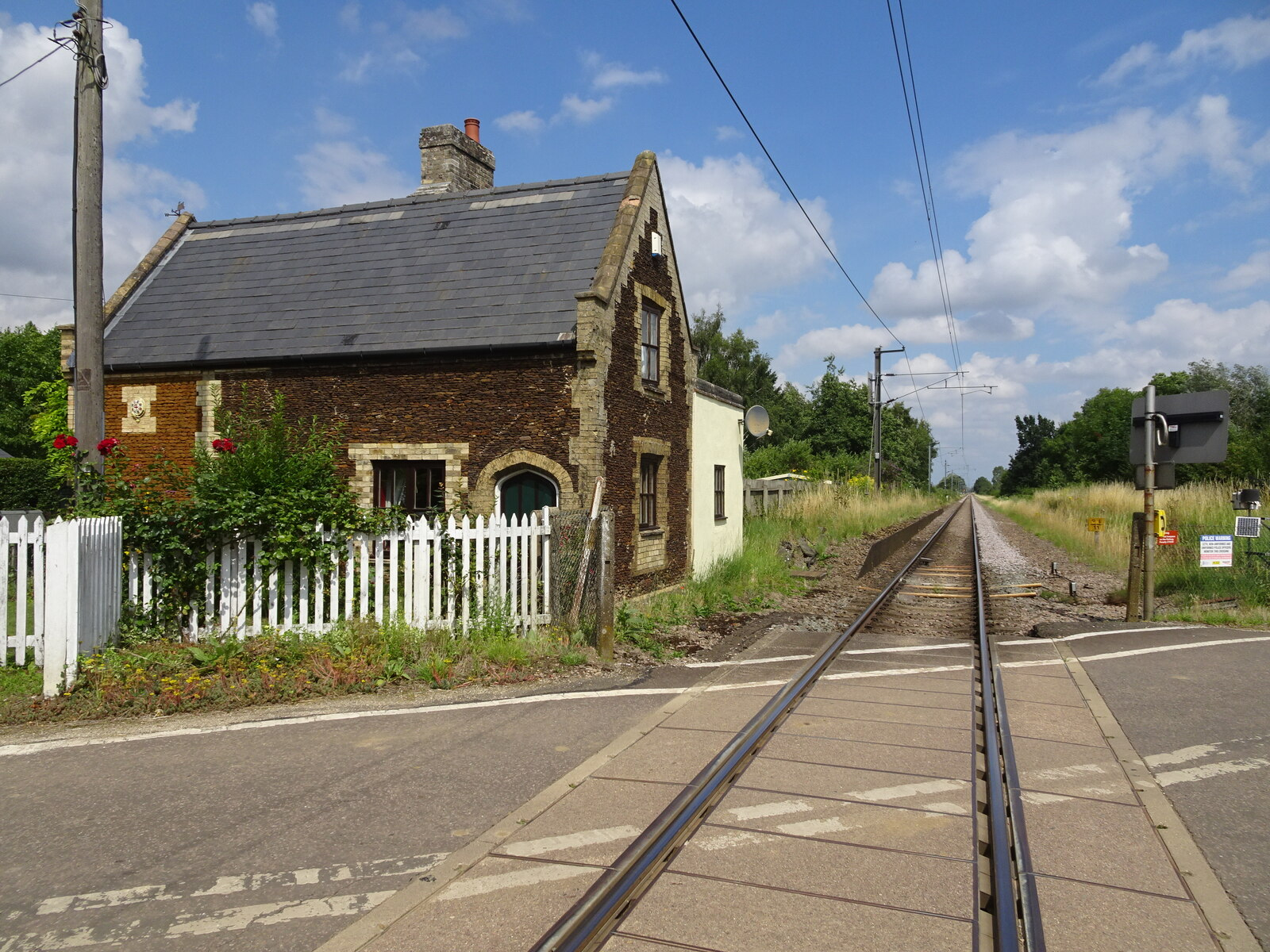
- Site of the station in 2021. The station building is on the left and the northbound platform is visible near the centre of the photo.

General information
- Location: Denver, King's Lynn and West Norfolk; England
- Grid reference: TF597008
- Platforms: 2

Other information
- Status: Disused

History
- Original company: East Anglian Railways
- Pre-grouping: Great Eastern Railway
- Post-grouping: London and North Eastern Railway

Key dates
- 1 January 1847: Opened as Denver Road Gate
- 25 October 1847: Renamed Denver
- 1 February 1870: Closed
- 1 July 1885: Re-opened
- 22 September 1930: Closed for passengers
- 13 July 1964: closed for freight
Location

Denver railway station (originally opened as Denver Road Gate) was a station in Denver, Norfolk on the Great Eastern Railway route between King's Lynn and Cambridge, commonly known as the Fen Line. It was also the beginning of a small branch to Stoke Ferry.

== History ==
The Lynn and Ely Railway (L&ER) had opened between King's Lynn and Downham on 27 October 1846. Two months later, on New Years Day 1847, the Lynn & Ely Railway was extended to Denver Road Gate Station. On 25 October 1847, the line was extended to Ely; but in the meantime, on 22 July 1847, the L&ER had amalgamated with the Lynn and Dereham Railway and the Ely and Huntingdon Railway to form the East Anglian Railways. The station was opened with the line to Ely. It closed on 1 February 1870, re-opened on 1 July 1885, and finally closed on 22 September 1930.

As of January 2024 the station building is a private house and both platforms are still standing.

== Routes ==
Preceding station	Historical railways	Following station
Ouse Bridge; Line open, station closed	Great Eastern Railway; Fen Line	Downham; Line and station open
	Disused railways	
Ryston; Line and station closed	Great Eastern Railway; Stoke Ferry Branch	Terminus
