= Hundreds of Norfolk =

Traditional administrative subdivision of Norfolk, England

Map of the hundreds of Norfolk

Between the 10th and the 19th centuries the hundreds of Norfolk and the boroughs of Norwich, King's Lynn, Thetford and Great Yarmouth were the administrative units of the English county of Norfolk. Each hundred had a separate council that met each month to rule on local judicial and taxation matters.

The system of dividing shires into hundreds was established in East Anglia following the conquest by Wessex in the early 10th century. The boundaries described at the time of the Domesday Survey of 1086 remained largely unchanged up to the 1970s. The 36 Domesday hundreds were subdivided into leets, now lost, and the boroughs of Norwich and Thetford ranked as separate hundreds, while Great Yarmouth was the chief town of three hundreds. Two of Thetford's parishes now lie partially in Norfolk with the remainder in Suffolk. The Domesday hundred of Emneth is now included in Freebridge, which was split into Freebridge-Lynn and Freebridge-Marshland. Docking hundred was then incorporated into Smithdon, and the boundary between Brothercross and Gallow hundreds was changed. By the 19th century there were 33 hundreds.

The leet court boundaries were more fluid and transient than the hundred court boundaries. At the time of Domesday, the parishes of the hundreds of Brothercross and Gallow "were strangely intermixed".

== Sites of hundred courts ==
The hundred courts were held at various sites across the county:

Name of hundred	Site of hundred court
Brothercross	At the cross by the ford over the Burnham
Clackclose	Clackclose Hill on Stradsett common
Depwade	At the "deep ford" over the Tas
Earsham	At an encampment near Earsham church.
Eynsford	Reepham
Forehoe	Parish of Carleton Forehoe
Freebridge	At Flitcham Burgh, afterwards at an oak at Gaywood and still later at an oak at Wiggenhall St Germans
Gallow	In the 15th century at Fakenham and in the 16th century at Longfield Stone
Greenhoe	By the tumuli on the London road to Swaffham
Grimeshoe	At a tumulus between Brandon and Norwich
Humbleyard	Parish of Swardeston
Launditch	At the crossing of the Norwich road with the long ditch between Longham and Beeston
Mitford	In 1639, at "Brokpit"
North Erpingham	At Guneby Gate near Gunton
Smithdon	Parish of Bircham Magna
South Erpingham	At Cawston Park Gate
Taverham	Frettenham Hill

== Parishes ==
In 1845 the hundreds of Norfolk contained the following parishes.

Hundred	Area	Parishes
Blofield	19,666 acres (79.59 km^{2})	Blofield, Braydeston, Brundall, Buckenham, Cantley, Freethorpe, Great Plumstead, Hassingham, Limpenhoe, Lingwood, Little Plumstead, North Burlingham, Postwick, South Burlingham, Southwood, Strumpshaw, Thorpe, Witton
Brothercross	19,169 acres (77.57 km^{2})	Burnham Deepdale, Burnham Sutton and Burnham Ulph, Burnham Norton, Burnham Overy, Burnham Thorpe, Burnham Westgate, North Creake, South Creake, Waterden
Clackclose	84,333 acres (341.28 km^{2})	Barton Bendish, Beachamwell, Bexwell, Boughton, Crimplesham, Denver, Downham Market, Fincham, Fordham, Hilgay, Holme next Runcton, Marham, Outwell, Roxham, Ryston, Shingham, Shouldham, Shouldham Thorpe, South Runcton, Southery, Stoke Ferry, Stow Bardolph, Stradsett, Thorpland, Tottenhill, Upwell, Watlington, Welney, Wereham, West Dereham, Wimbotsham, Wormegay, Wretton
Clavering	29,844 acres (120.77 km^{2})	Aldeby, Bergh Apton, Brooke, Burgh St. Peter, Ellingham, Geldeston, Gillingham All Saints and St. Mary, Haddiscoe, Hales, Heckingham, Howe, Kirby Cane, Norton Subcourse, Raveningham, Stockton, Thorpe, Thurlton, Toft Monks, Wheatacre
Depwade	30,491 acres (123.39 km^{2})	Ashwellthorpe, Aslacton, Bunwell, Carleton Rode, Forncett St Mary, Forncett St Peter, Fritton, Fundenhall, Great Moulton, Hapton, Hardwick, Hempnall, Morningthorpe, Shelton, Stratton St. Mary, Stratton St. Michael, Tacolneston, Tasburgh, Tharston, Tibenham, Wacton
Diss	23,628 acres (95.62 km^{2})	Bressingham, Burston, Dickleburgh, Diss, Fersfield, Frenze, Gissing, Roydon, Scole, Shelfanger, Shimpling, Thelveton, Thorpe Parva, Tivetshall St. Margaret, Tivetshall St. Mary, Winfarthing
Earsham	24,564 acres (99.41 km^{2})	Alburgh, Billingford, Brockdish, Denton, Earsham, Mendham, Needham, Pulham Market, Pulham St Mary, Redenhall with Harleston, Rushall, Starston, Thorpe Abbotts, Wortwell
East Flegg	11,556 acres (46.77 km^{2})	Caister, Filby, Great Yarmouth, Mautby, Ormesby St. Margaret, Ormesby St. Michael, Runham, Scratby, Stokesby with Herringby, Thrigby
Eynesford	46,637 acres (188.73 km^{2})	Alderford, Bawdeswell, Billingford, Bintree, Brandiston, Bylaugh, Elsing, Foulsham, Foxley, Great Witchingham, Guestwick, Guist, Hackford, Haveringland, Hindolveston, Little Witchingham, Lyng, Morton on the Hill, Reepham, Ringland, Salle, Sparham, Swannington, Themelthorpe, Thurning, Twyford, Weston Longville, Whitwell, Wood Dalling, Wood Norton
Forehoe	39,042 acres (158.00 km^{2})	Barford, Barnham Broom, Bawburgh, Bowthorpe, Brandon Parva, Carleton Forehoe, Colton, Costessey, Coston, Crownthorpe, Deopham, Easton, Hackford, Hingham, Honingham, Kimberley, Marlingford, Morley St. Botolph, Morley St. Peter, Runhall, Welborne, Wicklewood, Wramplingham, Wymondham
Freebridge-Lynn	68,366 acres (276.67 km^{2})	Anmer, Ashwicken, Babingley, Bawsey, Castle Acre, Castle Rising, Congham, Dersingham, East Walton, East Winch, Flitcham, Gayton, Gayton Thorpe, Gaywood, Great Massingham, Grimstone, Harpley, Hillington, King's Lynn, Leziate, Little Massingham, Middleton, Mintlyn, North Runcton, North Wootton, Pentney, Roydon, Sandringham, Setchey, South Wootton, West Acre, West Bilney, West Newton, West Winch, Wolferton
Freebridge-Marshland	53,908 acres (218.16 km^{2})	Clenchwarton, Emneth, Marshland St James, North Lynn, St Peter West Lynn, Terrington St. Clement, Terrington St. John, Tilney All Saints, Tilney St. Lawrence, Tilney cum Islington, Walpole St. Andrew, Walpole St. Peter, Walsoken, West Walton, Wiggenhall St. Germans, Wiggenhall St. Mary Magdalen, Wiggenhall St. Mary the Virgin, Wiggenhall St. Peter
Gallow	42,480 acres (171.9 km^{2})	Alethorpe, Bagthorpe, Barmer, Broomsthorpe, Dunton, East Barsham, East Raynham, East Rudham, Fakenham, Fulmodeston, Great Ryburgh, Helhoughton, Hempton, Kettlestone, Little Ryburgh, Little Snoring, New Houghton, North Barsham, Pensthorpe, Pudding Norton, Sculthorpe, Shereford, South Raynham, Stibbard, Syderstone, Tatterford, Tattersett, Testerton, Toftrees, West Barsham, West Raynham, West Rudham
Grimshoe	57,309 acres (231.92 km^{2})	Buckenham Tofts, Colveston, Cranwich, Croxton, Feltwell, Hockwold cum Wilton, Igborough, Lynford, Methwold, Mundford, Northwold, Santon, Stanford, Sturston, Weeting All Saints, West Tofts
Guiltcross	26,828 acres (108.57 km^{2})	Banham, Blo' Norton, East Harling, Garboldisham, Gasthorpe, Kenninghall, North Lopham, Quidenham, Riddlesworth, Rushford, Snarehill, South Lopham, West Harling
Happing	26,780 acres (108.4 km^{2})	Brumstead, Catfield, East Ruston, Happisburgh, Hempstead, Hickling, Horsey, Ingham, Lessingham, Ludham, Sea Palling, Potter Heigham, Stalham, Sutton, Walcott, Waxham
Henstead	19,086 acres (77.24 km^{2})	Arminghall, Bixley, Bramerton, Caistor St Edmund, Framingham Earl, Framingham Pigot, Holverstone, Kirby Bedon, Poringland, Rockland St. Mary, Saxlingham Nethergate, Saxlingham Thorpe, Shottesham All Saints, Shotesham, Stoke Holy Cross, Surlingham, Trowse, Whitlingham, Yelverton
Holt	35,294 acres (142.83 km^{2})	Bale, Bayfield, Blakeney, Bodham, Briningham, Brinton, Briston, Cley-next-the-Sea, Edgefield, Glandford, Gunthorpe, Hempstead, Holt, Hunworth, Kelling, Langham, Letheringsett, Melton Constable, Morston, Salthouse, Saxlingham, Sharrington, Stody, Swanton Novers, Thornage, Weybourne, Wiveton
Humbleyard	21,355 acres (86.42 km^{2})	Bracon Ash, Colney, Cringleford, Dunston, East Carlton, Flordon, Great Melton, Hethel, Hethersett, Intwood, Keswick, Ketteringham, Little Melton, Markshall, Mulbarton, Newton Flotman, Swainsthorpe, Swardeston, Wreningham
Launditch	56,006 acres (226.65 km^{2})	Beeston All Saints, Beetley, Brisley, Colkirk, Dillington, East Bilney, East Lexham, Gateley, Great Dunham, Great Fransham, Gressenhall, Hoe, Horningtoft, Kempstone, Litcham, Little Bittering, Little Dunham, Little Fransham, Longham, Mileham, North Elmham, Oxwick, Pattesley, Rougham, Scarning, Stanfield, Swanton Morley, Tittleshall, Weasenham All Saints, Weasenham St. Peter, Wellingham, Wendling, West Lexham, Whissonsett, Worthing
Loddon	27,838 acres (112.66 km^{2})	Alpington, Ashby, Bedingham, Broome, Carleton St. Peter, Chedgrave, Claxton, Ditchingham, Hardley, Hedenham, Hellington, Kirstead, Langley, Loddon, Mundham, Seething, Sisland, Thurton, Thwaite St. Mary, Topcroft, Woodton
Mitford	32,133 acres (130.04 km^{2})	Cranworth, East Dereham, East Tuddenham, Garvestone, Hardingham, Hockering, Letton, Mattishall, Mattishall Burgh, North Tuddenham, Reymerston, Shipdham, Southburgh, Thuxton, Westfield, Whinbergh, Wood Rising, Yaxham
North Erpingham	33,393 acres (135.14 km^{2})	Aldborough, Antingham, Aylmerton, Barningham Town, Barningham Norwood, Beeston Regis, Bessingham, Cromer, East Beckham, Felbrigg, Gimingham, Gresham, Gunton, Hanworth, Knapton, Matlask, Metton, Mundesley, North Repps, Overstrand, Plumstead, Roughton, Runton, Sheringham, Sidestrand, South Repps, Suffield, Sustead, Thorpe Market, Thurgarton, Trimingham, Trunch
North Greenhoe	30,483 acres (123.36 km^{2})	Barney, Binham, Cockthorpe, Egmere, Field Dalling, Great Snoring, Great Walsingham, Hindringham, Holkham, Houghton-in-Dale, Little Walsingham, Quarles, Stiffkey, Thursford, Warham All Saints, Warham St. Mary, Wells-next-the-Sea, Wighton
Shropham	44,944 acres (181.88 km^{2})	Attleborough, Besthorpe, Brettenham, Bridgham, East Wretham, Eccles, Great Ellingham, Hargham, Hockham, Illington, Kilverstone, Larling, New Buckenham, Old Buckenham, Rockland All Saints, Rockland St. Andrew, Roudham, Shropham, Snetterton, West Wretham, Wilby
Smithdon	43,786 acres (177.20 km^{2})	Barwick, Bircham Newton, Bircham Tofts, Brancaster, Choseley, Docking, Fring, Great Bircham, Great Ringstead, Heacham, Holme-next-the-Sea, Hunstanton, Ingoldisthorpe, Sedgeford, Shernborne, Snettisham, Stanhoe, Thornham, Titchwell
South Erpingham	48,058 acres (194.48 km^{2})	Alby with Thwaite, Aylsham, Baconsthorpe, Banningham, Barningham Parva, Belaugh, Blickling, Booton, Brampton, Burgh, Buxton, Calthorpe, Cawston, Colby, Coltishall, Corpusty, Erpingham, Great Hautboys, Hevingham, Heydon, Ingworth, Irmingland, Itteringham, Lammas with Little Hautboys, Mannington, Marsham, Oulton, Oxnead, Saxthorpe, Scottow, Skeyton, Stratton Strawless, Swanton Abbott, Tuttington, West Beckham, Wickmere, Wolterton
South Greenhoe	57,921 acres (234.40 km^{2})	Bodney, Caldecote, Cockley Cley, Didlington, East Bradenham, Foulden, Gooderstone, Great Cressingham, Hilborough, Holme Hale, Houghton-on-the-Hill, Langford, Little Cressingham, Narborough, Narford, Necton, Newton, North Pickenham, Oxborough, South Pickenham, Southacre, Sporle with Palgrave, Swaffham, West Bradenham
Taverham	30,600 acres (124 km^{2})	Attlebridge, Beeston St. Andrew, Catton, Crostwick, Drayton, Felthorpe, Frettenham, Hainford, Hellesdon, Horsford, Horsham St. Faith, Horstead with Stanninghall, Newton St. Faith, Rackheath, Salhouse, Spixworth, Sprowston, Taverham, Wroxham
Tunstead	34,696 acres (140.41 km^{2})	Ashmanhaugh, Bacton, Barton Turf, Beeston St. Lawrence, Bradfield, Crostwight, Dilham, Edingthorpe, Felmingham, Honing, Horning, Hoveton, Irstead, Neatishead, North Walsham, Paston, Ridlington, Sco Ruston, Sloley, Smallburgh, Swafield, Tunstead, Westwick, Witton, Worstead
Walsham	24,058 acres (97.36 km^{2})	Acle, Beighton, Fishley, Halvergate, Hemblington, Moulton, Ranworth-with-Panxworth, Reedham, South Walsham, Tunstall, Upton, Wickhampton, Woodbastwick
Wayland	31,076 acres (125.76 km^{2})	Ashill, Breckles, Carbrooke, Caston, Griston, Little Ellingham, Merton, Ovington, Rockland St. Peter, Saham Toney, Scoulton, Stow Bedon, Thompson, Threxton, Tottington, Watton
West Flegg	13,479 acres (54.55 km^{2})	Ashby, Billockby, Burgh St. Margaret, Burgh St. Mary, Clippesby, East Somerton, Hemsby, Martham, Oby, Repps with Bastwick, Rollesby, Thurne, West Somerton, Winterton-on-Sea

In addition the following four towns were considered as separate boroughs.

Borough	Acres
Great Yarmouth	1,270 acres (5.1 km^{2})
King's Lynn	2,720 acres (11.0 km^{2})
Norwich	6,630 acres (26.8 km^{2})
Thetford	6,976 acres (28.23 km^{2})

== See also ==
- History of Norfolk
- List of hundreds of England and Wales
