= Beeston =

Beeston may refer to:

== People ==
- Beeston (surname)

== Places in the United Kingdom ==
- Beeston, Bedfordshire, a hamlet
- Beeston, Cheshire, a village and civil parish
  - Beeston Castle
  - Beeston Castle and Tarporley railway station
- Beeston, Leeds, West Yorkshire, a suburb of Leeds
  - Beeston railway station (West Yorkshire)
- Beeston, Norfolk, a village
- Beeston Regis
- Beeston St Andrew
- Beeston St Lawrence, a former parish which is now part of Ashmanhaugh
- Beeston with Bittering
- Beeston Beck (Norfolk), a minor watercourse
- Beeston, Nottinghamshire, a town in Nottinghamshire
  - Beeston railway station
  - Beeston (UK Parliament constituency)
  - Beeston Urban District
- Beeston Tor, Staffordshire

== Other uses ==
- Beeston Brewery Company, a brewery based in Beeston, Nottinghamshire (1880–1922)

== See also ==
- Breaston, Derbyshire
