= Beachamwell =

Village and civil parish in the Breckland district of Norfolk, England

Coordinates: 52.619°N 0.591°E

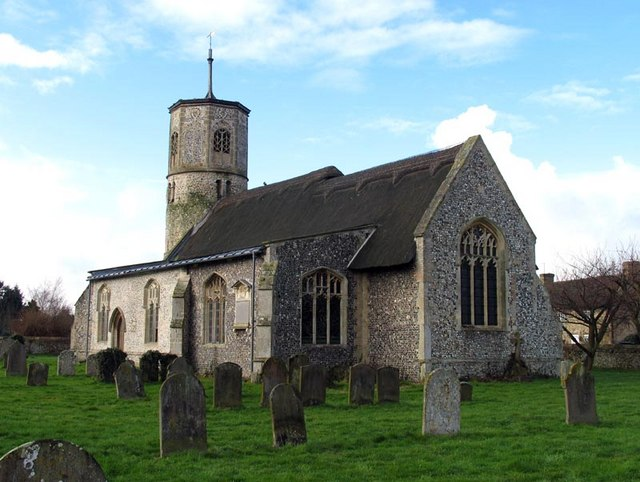
- St Mary's Church, Beachamwell

- Location within Norfolk
- Area: 22.15 km^{2} (8.55 sq mi)
- Population: 334 (2001 census); 339 (2011 Census)
  - Density: 15/km^{2} (39/sq mi)
- Civil parish: Beachamwell
- District: Breckland
- Shire county: Norfolk
- Region: East
- Country: England
- Sovereign state: United Kingdom
- Post town: SWAFFHAM
- Postcode district: PE37
- Dialling code: 01366
- Police: Norfolk
- Fire: Norfolk
- Ambulance: East of England
- UK Parliament: South West Norfolk

Beachamwell is a village and civil parish in the Breckland district of Norfolk, England about 5 miles (8.0 km) south west of Swaffham and 10 miles (16 km) east of Downham Market. It has four ancient churches, two of them in ruins. The former parish of Shingham is now part of the parish.

The name as spelt is the official one, but the alternative Beechamwell is found in modern publications as well as in historical sources. The correct spelling was a source of dispute in the village, until a parish council meeting in 1977 decided the matter.

== Geography ==
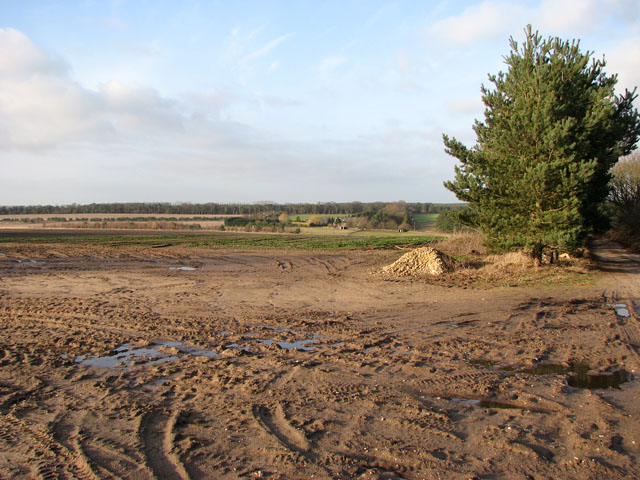
Farmland at Beachamwell Warren

The village is at the northern extremity of the Breckland and so its soil is light and sandy, free-draining and easily losing its fertility. This made traditional farming difficult, and so the north of the parish is occupied by Beachamwell Warren, once one of the most important mediaeval rabbit warrens in the Breckland. Some of the boundary earthworks can still be traced. However, the historical heathland here has mostly been lost, and the parish land use is now mostly either modern arable farming or conifer plantations, with a few semi-natural woodland areas – especially along a brook marking the southern boundary of the parish. The topography is flat.

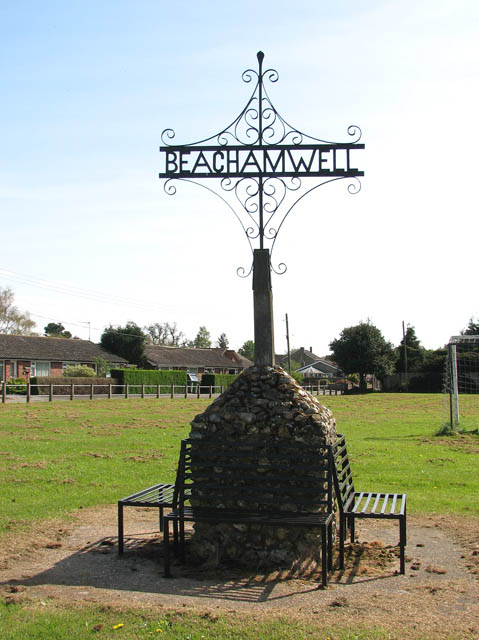
Beachamwell village green with village sign.

The location is isolated, and the main access is a country lane running south-west of Swaffham, looping north-west to join the A1122 east of Fincham. The core of the village itself is south of this lane, around a rectangular village green, with the church of St Mary at the west end and a pub at the east end. The former post office is just beyond the church, at 24–25.

The village includes the deer park of Beachamwell Hall. The mansion was rebuilt in 1906 after a fire, but the original 18th-century stables, ice-house and ha-ha survive.

To the east of the village is the hamlet of Shingham, which used to be a separate parish and which retains its own church building, St Botolph's. The hamlet of Drymere is strung along the road to Swaffham. It was created for forestry workers when the Warren was afforested. According to the 2011 census the village had a population then of 339, including Shingham.

== History ==
The parish has been the source of a rich collection of archaeological finds, mostly obtained by fieldwalking or metal-detecting. The light, easily worked soil was attractive to Neolithic farmers, and large numbers of worked flints have been recovered. A possible cursus exists just south-west of the All Saints church ruin.

A small menhir of uncertain date, called the Cowell Stone, marks the meeting point of the parishes of Beachamwell, Swaffham and Narborough. It has been moved a short distance from its original location, on a track leading north of the A1122 to Narford, and is no longer upright.

Numbers of Bronze Age artifacts have also been found, notably a copper alloy hammer near Lodge Farm. There are at least nine round barrows in the parish, and two of these are noted on the Ordnance Survey: South-east of Shingham, and at Hangour Hill on the A1122. The latter location had at least one other barrow, and could have been a cemetery. Iron Age pottery has been found in fieldwalking, also a possible chariot linchpin near the Roman road mentioned below.

=== Roman period ===
The A1122 to the east of Fincham follows the course of a Roman road that connected the Fen Causeway with Venta Icenorum (the present Caistor St Edmund), and ran through Beachamwell Warren. Roman-era finds have been rich, but no remains of Roman buildings have been identified. A trove of four pewter dishes were found during ploughing at Shingham Farm to the west of Shingham Wood in 1968, and a very unusual T-shaped brooch decorated with red enamel in the same general area in 1995. Two coin hoards were found in the 19th century. A site near the village called Decoy Close revealed a Roman cemetery with five burials, and also a rich assemblage of finds from the Neolithic through all eras into the Mediaeval.

=== Saxon and medieval development ===
The Devil's Dyke is a linear bank and ditch running in an almost straight line from Narborough to near Oxborough, parallel to the western boundary of the parish, and this is postulated as an early Saxon boundary marker. The date is not conclusive, however. The “Decoy Close” site mentioned above is postulated as an early Saxon burial ground owing to the richness of the metalwork finds here, but no burials have been found yet.

The church of St Mary is described as originally late Saxon, although the listed building description does not commit as to whether any of the surviving fabric is of this date.

The Domesday Book of 1086 listed three Saxon settlements in the present parish: Bicham (Beacham), Wella (Well) and Shingham. There was a church in Bicham, taken to be St Mary's. Wella had two mills and was around the later church of All Saints, which was not mentioned in Domesday – although a fragment of a Saxon stone cross was found incorporated into later fabric here. These two places were in the Hundred of Clackclose. Shingham was very small, with two households. Its settlement was in the Hundred of Clackclose, but part of the parish was in the Hundred of South Greenhow with the brook running through it being the boundary.

Beacham and Well consolidated to become Beachamwell when the settlements became contiguous in the early Middle Ages. Deserted medieval village earthworks around the All Saints church ruin, and in what is now Nut Wood, indicate that the resulting village was at least twice the size that it is now. There were three manors, called Well-Hall, Chervile’s and Ashfield and Joce’s; the latter two were named after families which had held them. Chervile's Manor included that part of Shingham in the Clackclose Hundred, and also had St Mary's Church.

All Saints’ church was built in the 12th century, as was Shingham church. However St John's seems to have been a later foundation, since the first rector (priest in charge) was recorded in 1304 and the surviving fabric is of that period. It was attached to Well-Hall Manor.

The farming of rabbits on an industrial scale at Beachamwell Warren was first recorded in about 1275, and continued in importance for five hundred years.

=== Early modern period ===
At the Reformation, there were four territorial parishes in the present parish area: Beachamwell St Mary, Beachamwell St John, Beachamwell All Saints and Shingham. However, St John's church did not survive. It was still in use in 1535, but abandoned by 1552. Despite this, because the priest-in-charge was a rector, he had a guaranteed income from the property, so a rector were appointed to the ruined church until 1723. The post was a sinecure. In about 1750, the antiquary Francis Blomefield paid a visit, and found that some poor people were living in huts within the ruin.

All Saints’ church also seems to have fallen into decay, but it was restored in 1612 by Thomas Athow, the Lord of the manor of Well-Hall, and the family used it as a mausoleum. However, it was abandoned in 1688 when the roof collapsed. The problem allegedly arose when the Athow family sold the manor, for the new Lord declined to accept responsibility for the upkeep of the whole church (the Lord of the manor was responsible for the chancel only). The church was in ruins by 1721, and Blomefield was indignant about the dereliction when he visited around 1750.

The three manors were consolidated into one country estate by 1760, based on Beachamwell Hall, which was rebuilt and provided with an ornamental deer-park. The Warren was enclosed by Act of Parliament in 1777; although rabbits were still reared, it was recorded in 1785 that much of the Warren had been arable farmland for some time. The Beachamwell Estate owned almost all the land in the Beachamwell and Shingham parishes, in the form of a few large tenant farms (there was only one in Shingham, called Shingham Farm).

In 1765, the rector of St Mary's found two Nottingham alabaster relief sculptures under the floor of the church's chancel. Francis Blomefield saw these, and described them as painted and gilded. One depicted the Deposition from the Cross, and the other showed St Peter. These were probably from one or both of the two altars in the church in medieval times, and were hidden at the Reformation. Their present whereabouts seem to be unknown.

In 1685 a Huguenot family named Motteux had fled Rouen in France for the City of London, in response to the Edict of Fontainebleau of that year ending any toleration of Calvinism in France. They did well (Peter Anthony Motteux was a noted playwright), and a descendant named John Motteux bought the Estate in 1780. He was a keen gardener, and propagated a new variety of eating apple called Beachamwell Seedling. This still exists and is available (2021) as a heritage variety.

John died in 1793, and his son inherited who was also called John.

=== 19th century ===
Shingham church was united with St Mary's in 1800, becoming a chapel of ease.

John Motteux the younger was a beneficent landlord, and improved the village. The timber-framed cottages were replaced with brick ones, beginning in 1815 (which is why the domestic buildings in the village lack interest). In 1832 the south aisle of St Mary's church was extended by him, and given a new lead roof. In 1835 he provided a school, the village's first. He died in 1843, and his monument is in the church.

The village pub, called the Cooper's Arms, was first licensed in 1846.

In 1851 the Estate was sold to Joshua Fielden, a descendant of the parliamentarian John Fielden and a member of a family running a cotton spinning and weaving business as Fielden Brothers at Waterside Mill, Todmorden, Lancashire. The Estate was originally bought as an investment, but Joshua's son (also called Joshua) contracted an “unsuitable” marriage and was banished to here as the resident squire in 1875. He hated it so much that he drank himself to death in 1892, but his widow inherited, remarried and her descendants kept possession until 1966.

In 1871, the population of the three Beachamwell parishes was 376 and Shingham had 78. The village had a post office, a shop, a shoemaker, a resident surgeon, the pub and a smithy next door. The pub was a beerhouse (it didn't sell wine or spirits), and the publican was also the blacksmith. The school was extended in 1875. Unusually, school dinners were provided at the pub until 1972 when the village hall took over as a venue.

In 1883, Shingham church's roof was reported as being in thatch over the nave, and slate over the chancel. Only the latter was in use as a mortuary chapel for the graveyard, but the former was derelict. Services had ceased, and the altar was moved to St Mary's.

A reading room was opened in a village cottage in 1891. A Wesleyan Methodist chapel was opened in 1892, on the lane to Shingham.

The Local Government Act 1894 created the civil parish and parish council of Beachamwell by merging the three ancient parishes, to be part of the Swaffham Rural District Council.

=== 20th century ===
In 1902 a fire completely destroyed the Hall, and this was rebuilt in 1906 in the Queen Anne style by the architects Wimperis and Best. No photograph of the old mansion has been traced, so it is not known if the rebuilding resembled the original edifice.

In 1911, the roofless nave of Shingham church was re-roofed in corrugated iron, subsequently replaced with copper sheeting. It was then used for services until 1941.

After the First World War, a demobbed army hut was acquired for use as a village hall and re-erected on the village green.

In 1924 the Forestry Commission bought 800 acres (320 hectares) of the former Warren from the Beachamwell Estate, and planted conifers on it. The forestry workers were provided with the new hamlet of Drymere, built along the road to Swaffham.

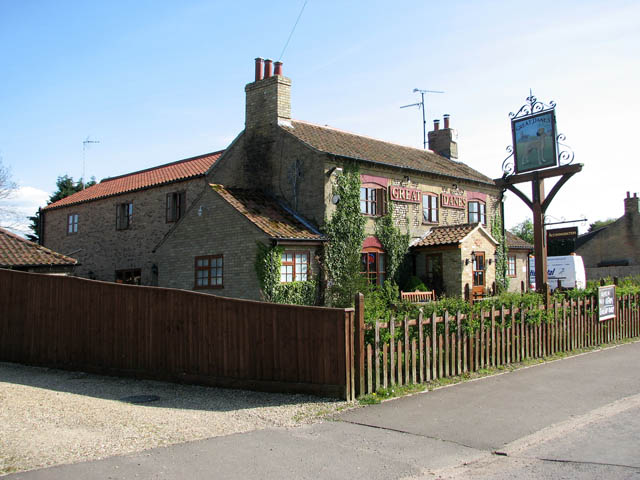
The Great Danes pub

In 1927 the Cooper's Arms (formerly a free house) was bought by the Norwich brewers Steward & Patteson. It had the nickname of the “Hole in the Wall”, because of a hatch allowing the sale of takeaway beer to those waiting outside.

The 1926 revision of the Ordnance Survey documented the beginning of the 20th-century expansion of the village, which lead to a ribbon of housing along the east side of Chestnut Walk as far as the Swaffham Road junction.

In 1935 Shingham civil parish was annexed to that of Beachamwell, creating the parish boundaries extant today.

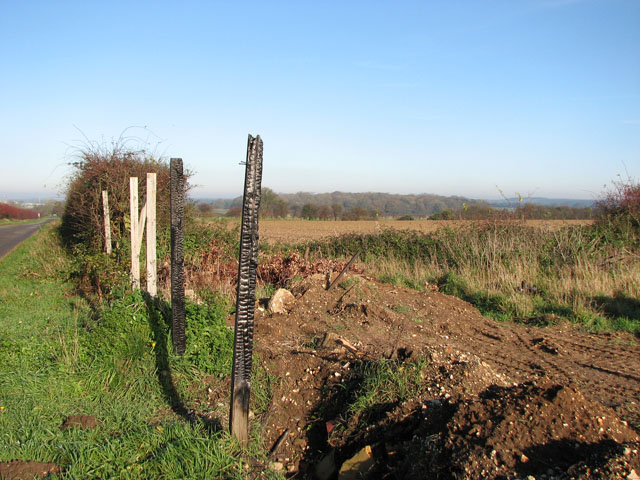
Site of a Royal Observer Corps Monitoring Post

The Royal Observer Corps had a monitoring post on a lane called Narborough Hill (east side), which had an Orlit A post. This was in operation during the Cold War, from 1959 to 1991.

In 1963, a proper village hall was built to replace the old army hut, and was named the Memorial Hall so as to do duty as the village's war memorial. It took over as a venue for school dinners from the pub in 1972, and continued this function until 1983.

In 1967, the pub became the property of Watneys Brewery of London when it took over Steward & Patteson Brewery. Watneys closed the pub in 1974, part of a deeply resented policy of closing down village pubs by the company which had a monopoly in Norfolk. However, the pub here was re-opened as a free house called the “Great Danes Head” in 1977. It was again renamed as the “Great Dane Country Inn” in 2004.

In 1976, the ownership of Shingham church was transferred to the Estate and so it ceased to be a working church. It had been disused since 1941. However the graveyard was kept and is now the cemetery of St Mary's, because the latter's own graveyard is full.

In 1996 the school had to close down, owing to the number of children attending having dropped to nine.

=== 21st century ===
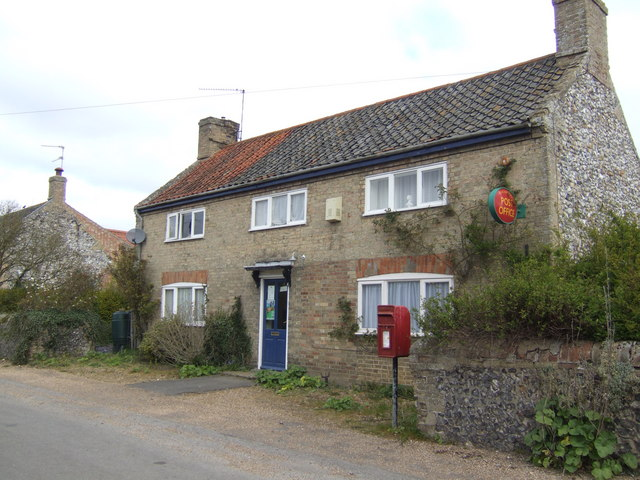
Beachamwell post office at the end of its life, 2009

The Post Office became unviable economically, and so was closed down. It was replaced by a mobile post office, visiting the village for twenty minutes or so on four days a week.

The lead roof on the south aisle of the church, re-laid by John Motteux the younger in 1832, was stolen in 2019, and this closed the church until repairs could be undertaken. Scaffolding was put up to aid the lead installation. The congregation had already dwindled to single figures by then, and was incapable of maintaining the building on its own. So, it was decided to abandon regular services and only hold them on the major feasts of the Christian calendar. It was hoped, however, to keep the church open daily for visitors with the help of a rota of volunteers.

The church was gutted by fire in February 2022, losing its thatched roof.

== Governance ==
Beachamwell Parish Council has a limited responsibility for local amenities, and advises Breckland District Council as regards planning and service issues. The parliamentary constituency is South West Norfolk.

== Social amenities ==
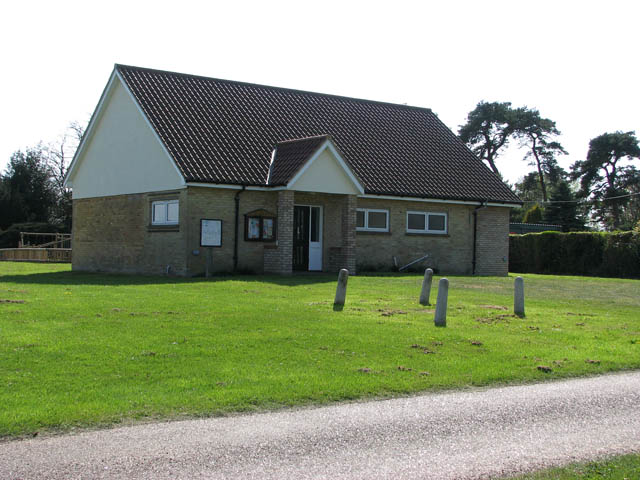
Beachamwell Village Hall

The village's main social amenity is the village hall. The village green is used as a recreation ground. The village has no other amenities.

== Transport ==
The nearest railway station is Downham Market. There is no connecting bus service. Before its railway closed in 1968, Swaffham station was closest. The village's bus service, number 31, is run by West Norfolk Community Transport and operates on a Saturday only.

== St Mary's church ==
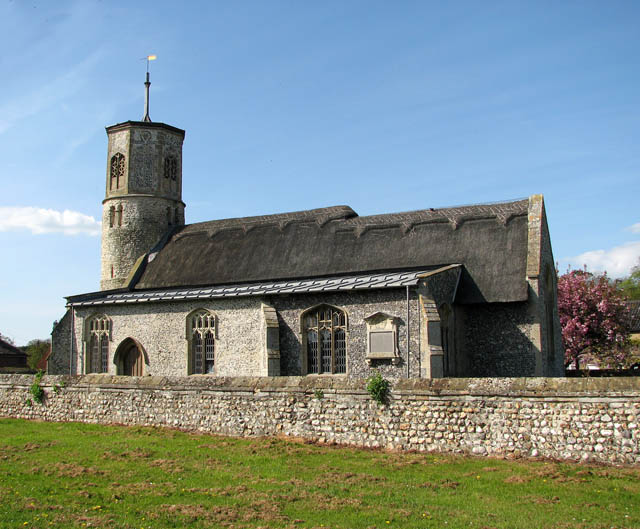
St Mary's Church. Its thatched roof was destroyed by fire in February 2022.

Beachamwell St. Mary is a Grade I listed building, and one of 124 existing round-tower churches in Norfolk. St Mary's is the last surviving working church of the four that once served this parish territory. It is in the Diocese of Ely. A significant fire destroyed the roof on 2 February 2022.

It was previously considered that the extant church was constructed in the late Saxon period, but new evidence indicates that the tower at least was erected post-Conquest. However, the nave interior suggests that the tower was added to a pre-existing building which probably dates to the late Saxon period. The church was substantially re-modelled in the Perpendicular style in a campaign covering the 14th and early 15th centuries. This involved the addition of a south aisle, a decorative north doorway with a porch, replacement windows and a new bell-chamber for the tower. There was a restoration in 1832, and another one of the chancel at the end of the 19th century.

The tower is a flint cylinder, formerly rendered, which displays evidence that it was built in two stages because there is a slight setback about halfway up. A two-light Perpendicular window faces west from the ground floor. The original sound-holes are very small and in pairs, one pair for each cardinal direction and in different styles. Those facing west and north have triangular tops, while those facing east and south have arched tops. The pair facing west has a dividing colonnette in the form of a bulbous baluster and with oversized astragal mouldings. The pair facing north have a dividing slab which is a re-used late Saxon grave-slab with carved interlace.

A replacement bell-chamber was built in the 14th century. This is octagonal, in fine flintwork using split flints and with flushwork in limestone. Four faces each have a two-light sound-hole, the bottom part blocked with brickwork and the rest given a brickwork lattice in the form of tessellated equilateral triangles. The other four sides each have flushwork in the form of two-light window tracery. There are two bells in the tower which are dated to c. 1499. First reports after the fire indicate that they are undamaged.

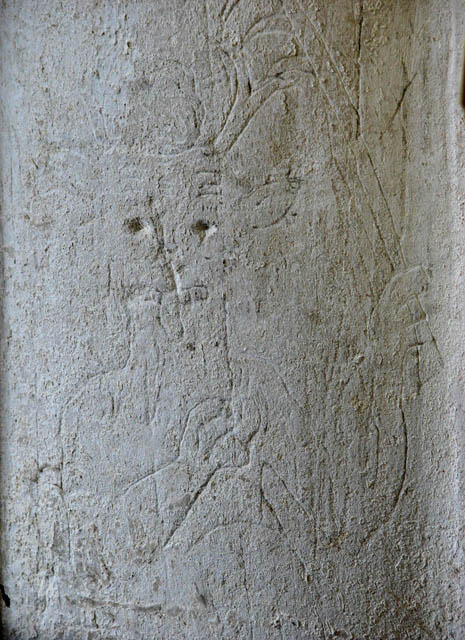
St Mary's church – The Beachamwell Devil

The church is famous for its medieval graffiti, most of all for the depiction of a devil on the medieval arcade column, known as the 'Beachamwell Devil'. Also there a lady in a wimple, and an apparent inventory of building materials used by masons in construction.

The thatched roof of the church caught alight on 2 February 2022. The fire is believed to have been started by a spark from lead welding that was being carried out by workmen on the roof. The church was extensively damaged with the thatched roof, windows and fittings destroyed. Most of the written records and most of the valuable items were recovered intact, although the Baptismal records were lost.

== St Botolph, Shingham ==
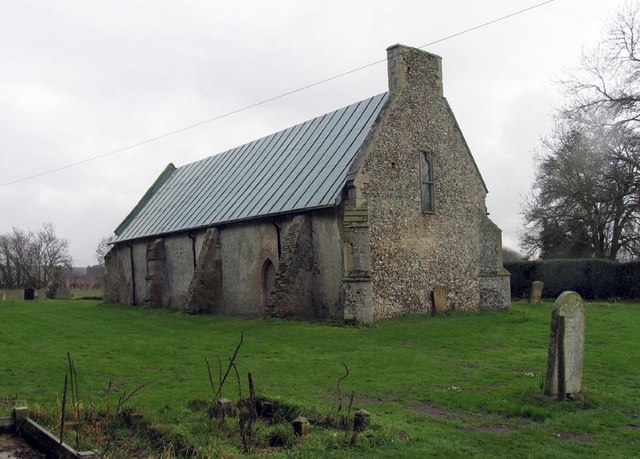
St Botolph's, Shingham from the north-west

Shingham church is a Grade I listed building. The dedication is to St Botolph. It was built in the 12th century, but was substantially modified in the 14th century, with lesser works in the previous and subsequent centuries. It was originally a parish church, but was united with St Mary's in 1800, becoming a chapel of ease. In 1883, the church's roof was reported as being in thatch over the nave, and slate over the chancel, with the chancel being used as a mortuary chapel for the graveyard. Services had ceased, and the altar was moved to St Mary's.

In 1911, the nave was re-roofed in corrugated iron, subsequently replaced with copper sheeting which also replaced the slate chancel roof. It was used for services until 1941, when it became disused again. In 1976, the ownership of the redundant building was transferred to the Estate and so it ceased to be a working church. The graveyard was kept and is now the cemetery of St Mary's, because the latter's own graveyard is full.

== Listed buildings ==
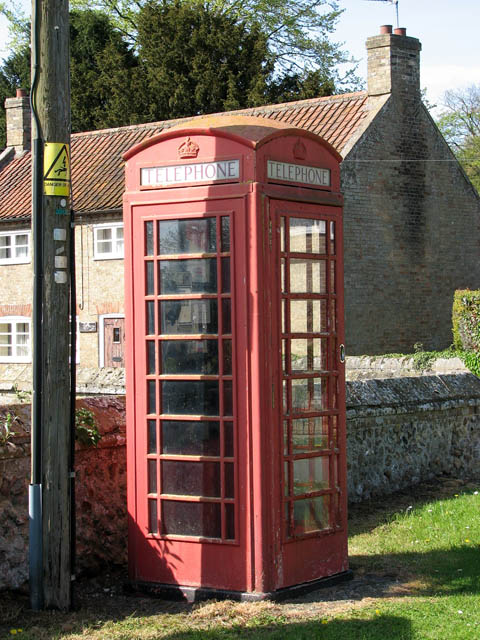
Beachamwell red phone box, a Listed Building.

The parish has nine listed buildings. The churches of St Mary and St Botolph are Grade I. The two ruined churches are Grade II, as are the phone box and the two crosses. Two pairs of the semi-detached estate cottages around the green, built by John Motteux in 1832, have been listed. These are numbers 26–27, and 28–29.

Beachamwell Hall of 1906, with its late 18th-century stables, is not listed. Neither is Beachamwell School, south of the church, from 1835 but extended in 1875.

=== Ruined church of All Saints ===
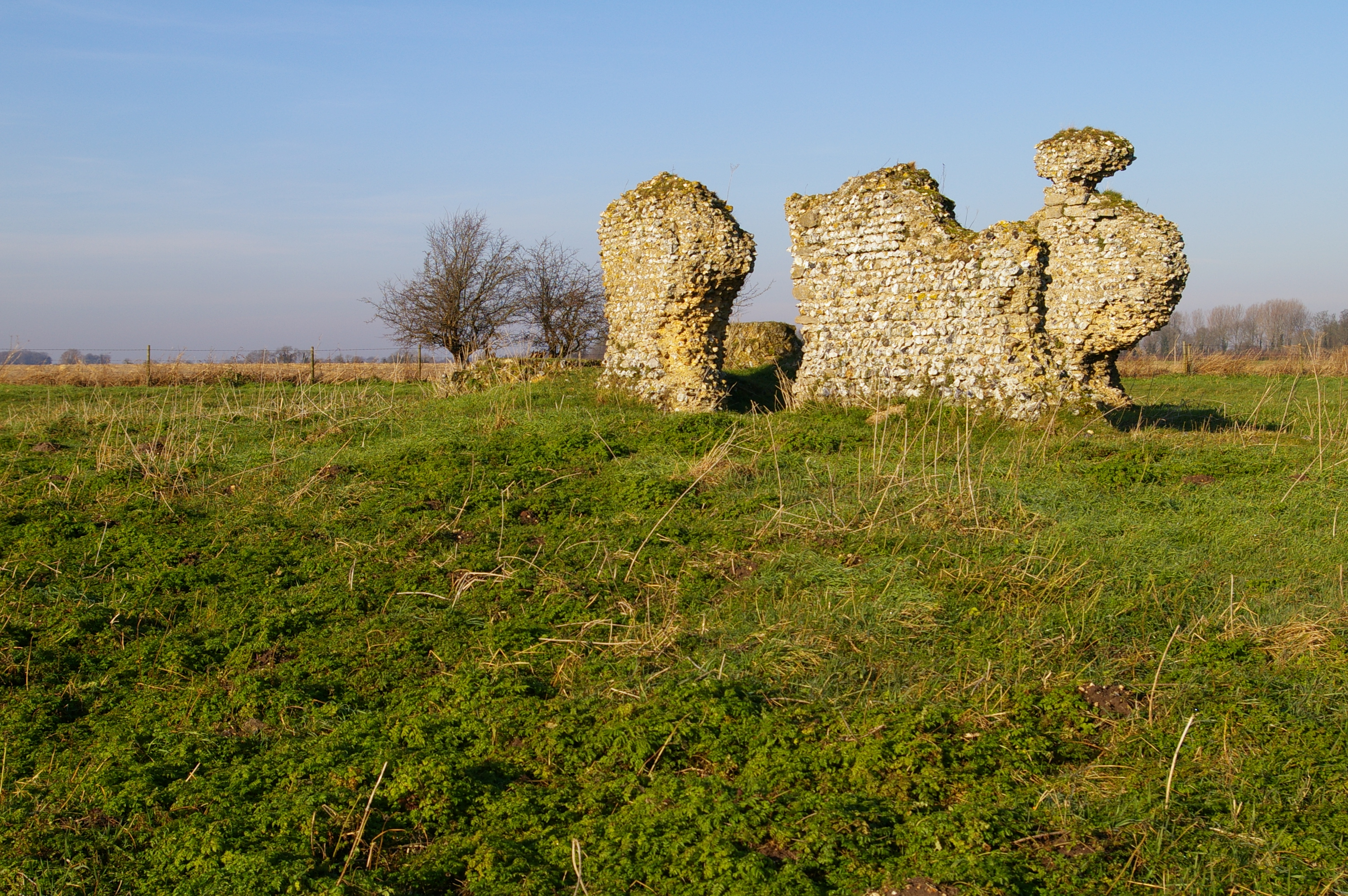
The ruins of All Saints' Church from the south.

Beachamwell All Saints' Church was built in the 12th century, but stonework found in the ruin indicates that it was remodelled in the 14th and 15th centuries. After the Reformation it seems to have fallen into decay and there is evidence of a fire, but it was restored in 1612 by Thomas Athow, the Lord of the manor of Well-Hall. His family then used it as a mausoleum. However, it was abandoned again in 1688 when the roof collapsed.

The ruin is a Grade II listed building.

=== Ruined church of St John ===
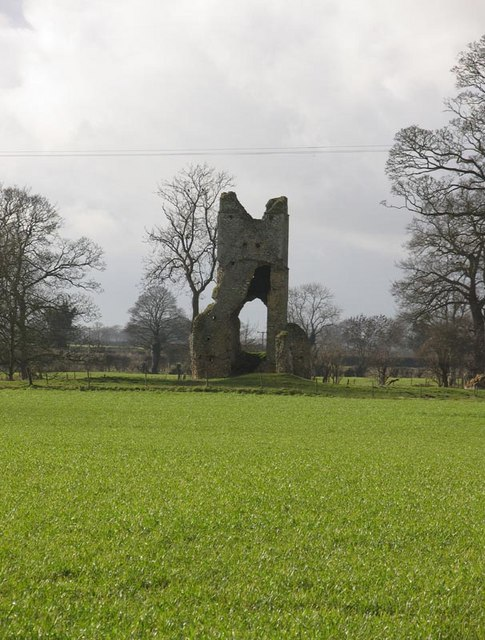
St John's Church, Beachamwell.

St John's church seems to have been a late medieval foundation, with the first rector recorded in 1304 and the surviving fabric is of that period. It was still in use in 1535, but abandoned by 1552. However, because the priest-in-charge was a rector, he had a guaranteed income from the property, so a rector were appointed to the ruined church until 1723. The post was a sinecure. In about 1750, the antiquary Francis Blomefield paid a visit, and found that some poor people were living in huts within the ruin.

The ruin is in a field south of St John's Farm. There is no public access, although it is visible at a distance from the lane. The tower and a fragment of the north wall of the nave remain Attached to the tower on both sides are remains of the nave west wall. The plan of the rest of the church is not discernible in the grass, but Blomefield estimated the building to have been 66 feet (20 metres) in length.

The tower is in flint, with ashlar dressings. All the accessible stonework has been robbed, leaving gaping voids where the tower arch and a large west window used to be. The ruin is a Grade II listed building.

=== Crosses ===
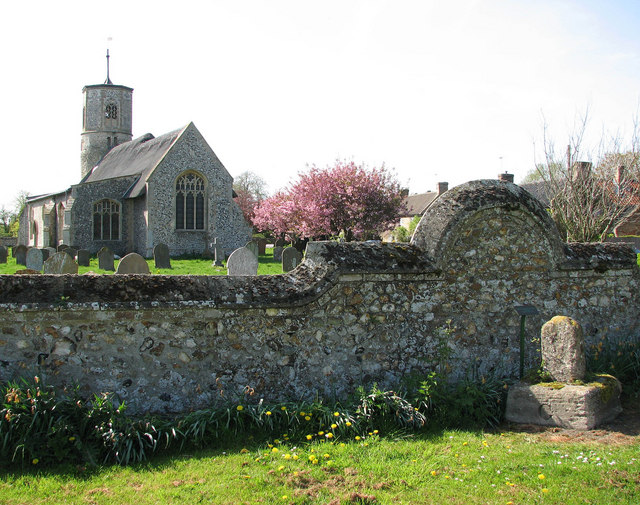
Beachamwell Village Cross

The village is unusual in having two wayside crosses. Both are Grade II Listed.

The central one is close to the east wall of the churchyard, near the phone box. It has been moved twice. Originally it stood at the other end of the village green, near the pub, but in the mid 19th century it was appropriated as a boundary marker for the glebe and moved 733 yards (670 metres) north-east. In 1984 it was moved again, to the present site. What remains is a socket stone about 28 inches (71 cm) square, and the base of the shaft which is rectangular in cross-section – about 13 inches (33 cm) long, 7 inches (18 cm) wide and 22 inches (56 cm) high. A G for “Glebe” is incised on the south-east face of the socket stone.

The northern cross is located just west of the junction of Chestnut Walk and the Swaffham Road, just north of the roadway here. However, this cross has been moved as well. Originally it stood on a low mound nearer the road, but was knocked over by a cart in 1910 and so moved back. The mound has vanished. The socket stone is about 28 inches (71 cm) square, and has sunk into the ground. The cross shaft is square below and octagonal above, 13.5 inches (34 cm) square at the base and 55 inches (140 cm) high.
