= Stradsett =

Village in Norfolk, England

Coordinates: 52.61785°N 0.45885°E

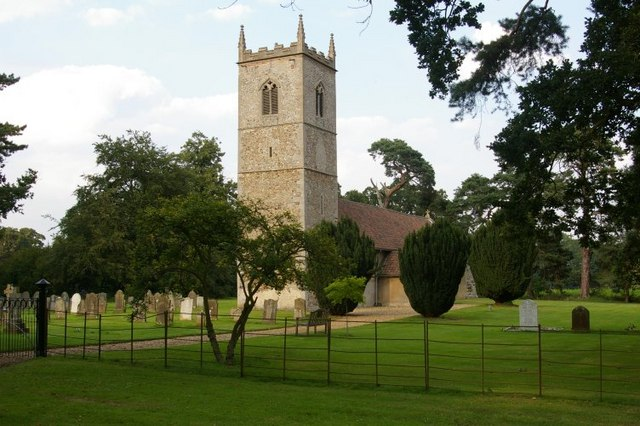
- Saint Mary's parish church, Stradsett.

- Location within Norfolk
- Area: 5.45 km^{2} (2.10 sq mi)
- Population: 60 (parish, 2001 census)
  - Density: 11/km^{2} (28/sq mi)
- OS grid reference: TF6605
  - London: 96.4 miles (155.1 km)
- Civil parish: Stradsett
- District: King's Lynn and West Norfolk
- Shire county: Norfolk
- Region: East
- Country: England
- Sovereign state: United Kingdom
- Post town: King's Lynn
- Postcode district: PE33
- Dialling code: 01366
- Police: Norfolk
- Fire: Norfolk
- Ambulance: East of England
- UK Parliament: South West Norfolk

Stradsett is a village and civil parish in the English county of Norfolk The village is 40.8 miles (65.7 km) west of Norwich, 11.3 miles (18.2 km) south of King's Lynn and 96.4 miles (155.1 km) north of London. The nearest town is Downham Market which is 3.5 miles (5.6 km) west of the parish. The village is located on the A1122 which runs between Outwell and Swaffham. The A134 between King's Lynn and Colchester also passes through the parish. The nearest railway station is at Downham Market for the Fen Line which runs between King's Lynn and Cambridge. The nearest airport is Norwich International Airport. The parish of Stradsett, in the 2001 census, has a population of 60. For the purposes of local government, the parish falls within the district of King's Lynn and West Norfolk. At the 2011 Census the population remained less than 100 and was included in the civil parish of Crimplesham.

== Description ==
The village and parish of Stradsett is situated in the west of Norfolk. The parish has an area of 543 hectares which is largely devoted to agricultural activity and is dominated by the estate of Stradsett Park. Stradsett Hall is the ancestral home of Sir Jeremy Bagge, 7th Baronet and former High Sheriff of Norfolk. The parish is bordered to the north by the parish of Shouldham Thorpe, west and south by Crimplesham and Fincham to the east

The name Stradsett is thought to be a hybrid of the Latin strata for road and the Old English saeta of place, thought to mean place by a Roman road. This name arose from the fact that the part of the Roman road known as the Fen Causeway ran through the parish.

The hundred court of Clackclose hundred was held at Clackclose Hill on Stradsett common;
