= Bittering =

Bittering may refer to:

- Bittering agent
- Bittering, Norfolk
