= Wereham =

Coordinates: 52.586°N 0.480°E

- Location within Norfolk
- Area: 8.59 km^{2} (3.32 sq mi)
- Population: 660 (2011 census)
  - Density: 77/km^{2} (200/sq mi)
- OS grid reference: TF680016
- District: King's Lynn and West Norfolk
- Shire county: Norfolk
- Region: East
- Country: England
- Sovereign state: United Kingdom
- Post town: KING'S LYNN
- Postcode district: PE33
- Dialling code: 01366
- Police: Norfolk
- Fire: Norfolk
- Ambulance: East of England
- UK Parliament: South West Norfolk

Wereham is a small village and civil parish in the English county of Norfolk.

== Location ==
Wereham lies in the Wissey valley and is on the main A134 road; it is some five miles to the east of the town of Downham Market and thirteen miles from King's Lynn. Neighbouring villages include Boughton, Fincham, Crimplesham, West Dereham, Wretton and Stoke Ferry.

== History ==
The villages name means 'Homestead/village on the River Wigor' or 'hemmed-in land by the River Wigor'. Wigor may be an older name for the River Wissey.

The former Benedictine alien priory of St Winwaloe is now Winnold House. It lies a mile north of the village. A large fair was held on St Winnold's Day (3 March); the fair moved to Downham Market in 1798.

In the centre of the village is the pond - known locally as the pit. Nearby on the village green, the village sign depicts 'Billy the Seal', one of Wereham's most famous residents from the 1920s.

== Facilities ==
Wereham once had four pubs: the George and Dragon, The Crown, The Nags Head and The Chequers; however, only the George and Dragon remains. The village also had a school which closed in the 1980s.

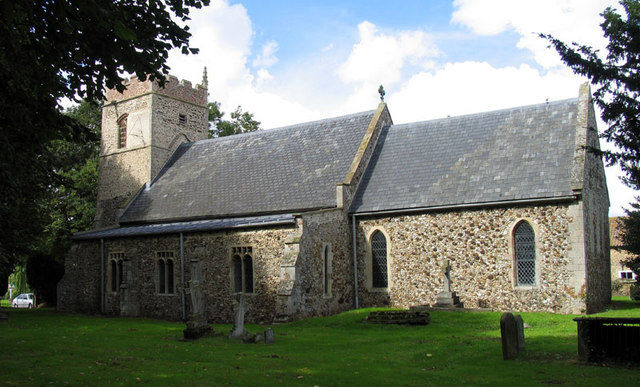
St Margaret of Antioch, Wereham

The Parish Church, dedicated to St Margaret of Antioch, is in the centre of the village.

2018 will see the completion of the 1st UK Passivhaus village hall www.werehamvillagehall.co.uk Passivhaus buildings provide a high level of occupant comfort while using very little energy for heating and cooling.
