= Winnold House =

Coordinates: 52.6073°N 0.4917°E

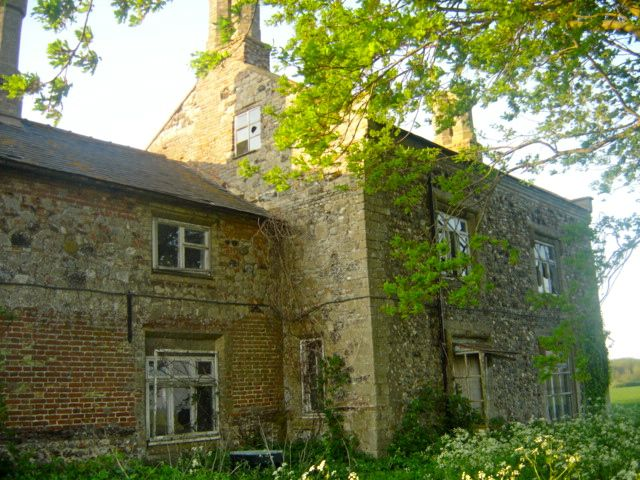
- Winnold House, the south facade, as seen from the south-western driveway

- Location within Norfolk
- Former names: St Winwaloe Priory

General information
- Type: House
- Location: Wereham, King's Lynn, United Kingdom
- Completed: 1199

Technical details
- Floor count: 3

Listed Building – Grade II*
- Official name: Winnold House, Wereham
- Designated: 9 July 1951
- Reference no.: 1077747

Winnold House, formerly the Benedictine Priory of St Winwaloe, is a country house in the parish of Wereham in Norfolk, England. The house is constructed from the remaining fragments of a former Benedictine priory. The priory was founded in 1199 and was dissolved in 1321. It was demolished in 1539, and the surviving fragments were incorporated into a house sometime in the 17th century; it was rebuilt in the mid-19th century. It is a Grade II* listed building.

== History ==
The St Winwaloe's Priory was founded by the earls of Clare during the reign of Richard I in the late twelfth century. It was dedicated to Winwaloe (also known as Guenolo or Winnold), a Breton saint who flourished about 550 CE, and whose body was enshrined in the Abbey of St Salvius and St Winwaloe, Monsterol (now Montreuil-sur-Mer) in the diocese of Amiens in France. It was an alien priory of Monsterol.

The earliest extant deed of the priory is one of 1199, whereby L., prior of St Winwaloe, with the consent and advice of his brother, Remigius, abbot of Monsterol, granted a toft and eleven acres to Robert de Stradesete. In 1270, there was an exchange of lands in Wereham between the abbot and convent of Wereham and the abbot and convent of St Salvin's of Monsterol, acting on behalf of the priory of St Winwaloe. At the time, the priory held lands in three Norfolk parishes, with the annual value of £7.

In 1321, the abbot and convent of Monsterol sold the priory to Hugh Scarlet of Lincoln, who conveyed it to Elizabeth de Clare, the foundress of Clare College, Cambridge. In 1336 she conveyed the manor and lands of the priory to the abbot and convent of West Dereham on the condition that he would find a chaplain to say daily mass in the chapel of St Winwaloe for the souls of Gilbert, earl of Clare, and of Elizabeth and her ancestors and heirs forever. Ten years later, Elizabeth granted the custody of the priory to her friend, John de Brauncestre.

At the dissolution of the manor of Winwaloe, late belonging to the abbey of Wereham, came to the crown, and was granted to Thomas Guybon and William Mynn.

A large fair was held on St Winnold's Day (3 March); the fair moved to Downham Market in 1798.

== Architecture ==
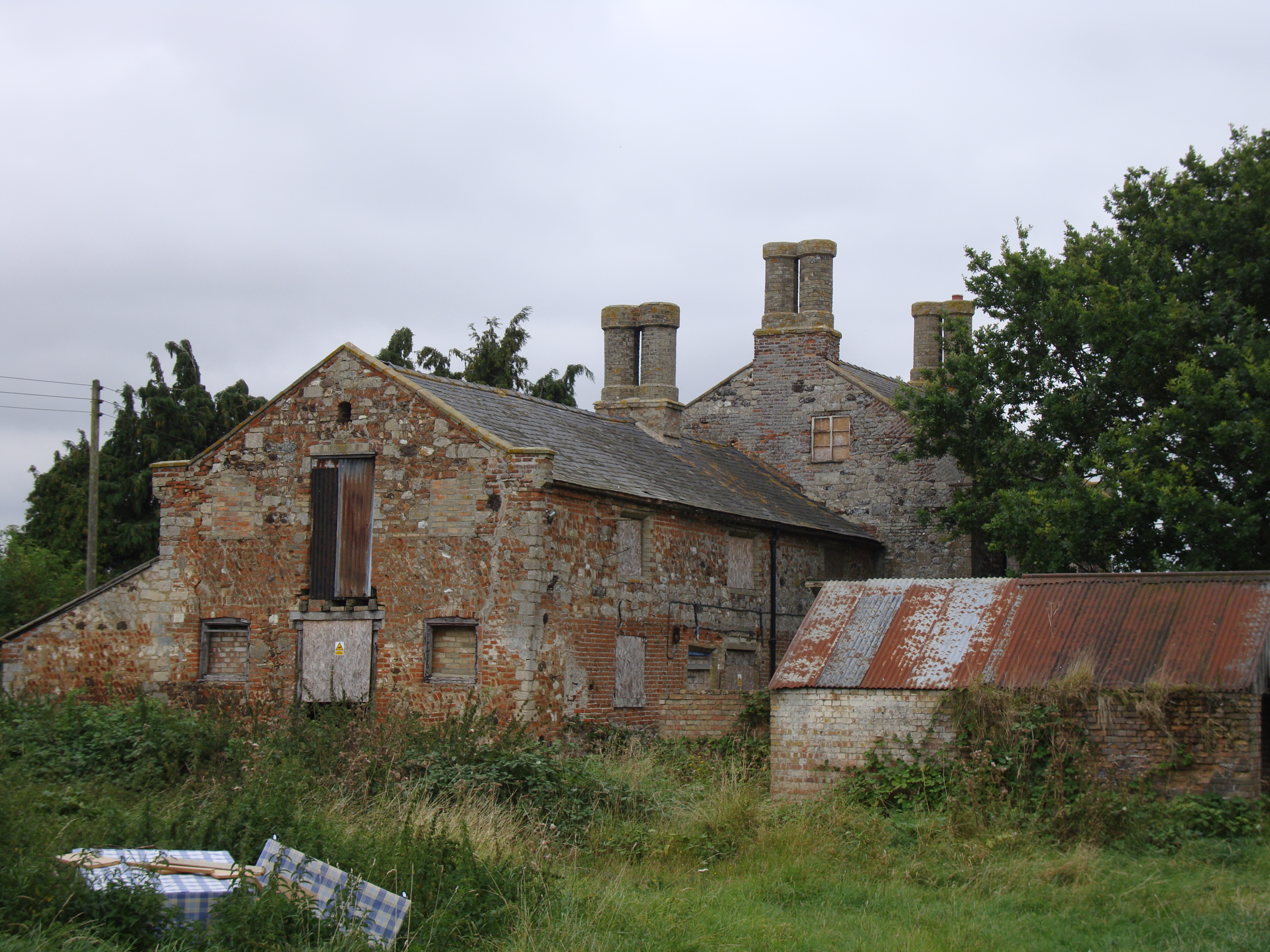
Winnold House

The remains of the priory can be seen on many of the walls of the house.

=== Design ===
The priory's stonework is ashlar and coping, and the roof is composed of slate. South front of two storeys in two bays. 20th-century door and porch to left. Windows are 3-light cross casements under re-used square hoods on head stops. Triangular stops to first floor casements. Moulded ashlar eaves cornice below gabled roof with 19th-century internal end stacks carrying twin octagonal gault brick flues. Gable ends on kneelers. East wall with remains of external stack, flat buttress to left and clasping buttress to right, the latter being the remains of a 12th-century pier: single shaft to left and on north face multi-shafted above set-off. Two set-offs to the east gable wall, remains of one 12th-century lancet, and a 17th-century attic window. North elevation with 12th-century string course at first floor, flat central buttress, and remains of annulated engaged column to the right. Three inserted casements and door. Dentil eaves cornice. To the west, an early 19th-century brick and ashlar extension in two storeys. 19th- and 20th-century casements, gabled slate roof and ridge stack right of centre with paired octagonal gault brick flues.
