= Sir Thomas Dereham, 4th Baronet =

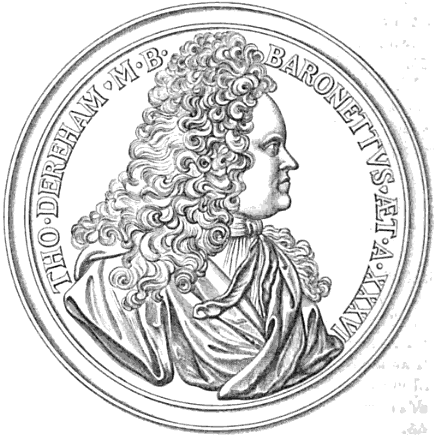
- Medal of Thomas Dereham aged 36 by Massimiliano Soldani Benzi
- Born: 1678; West Dereham Abbey, Norfolk, England
- Died: 16 January 1738 (aged 59–60); Rome, Italy
- Known for: Informal Jacobite ambassador to Rome

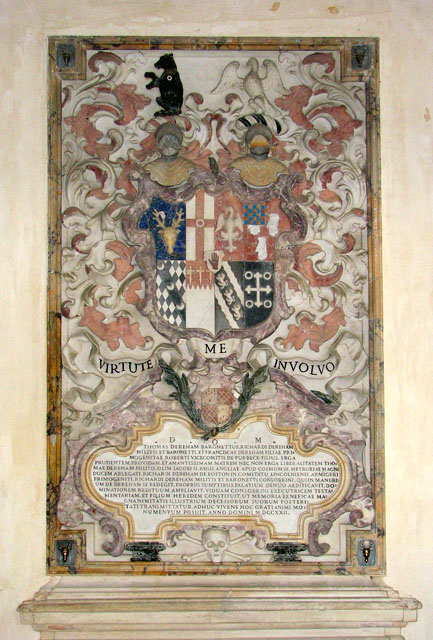
Monument in West Dereham Church, Norfolk, made in Florence and erected in 1722 by the 4th Baronet, in memory of his cousin and benefactor Sir Thomas Dereham, Knight (d.1697) envoy to the Court of Tuscany

Sir Thomas Dereham, 4th Baronet (or Derham) (ca. 1678–1739), FRS, was an English baronet who spent most of his life in Italy, where he acted as an informal representative for the Old Pretender, known as James III to his supporters.

== Origins ==
Sir Thomas Dereham was born in West Dereham Abbey, Norfolk, the son and heir of Sir Richard Dereham, 3rd Baronet, by his wife Frances Villiers (alias Wright, Howard, Danvers), a daughter of Robert Danvers, Viscount Purbeck (1624-1674) (alias Wright, Howard, Villiers) the illegitimate son of Frances Coke (probably by Sir Robert Howard of Clun Castle, Shropshire), the estranged wife of John Villiers, 1st Viscount Purbeck.

== Career ==
He was an English soldier and landowner who briefly sat in the House of Commons in 1659 and 1660. The illegitimate child of a notorious liaison, Danvers had at least four different names, changed his religion four times, and sided according to circumstances with Royalists, Parliamentarians, the restored monarchy, and its opponents. Dereham was an Anglo-Catholic. He was given into the care of his cousin, Sir Thomas Dereham, Knight (d.1697) envoy to Cosimo III de' Medici, Grand Duke of Tuscany. He later inherited the property of his cousin. He was educated in Florence at the court of Cosimo III de' Medici, Grand Duke of Tuscany.

=== Jacobite representative ===
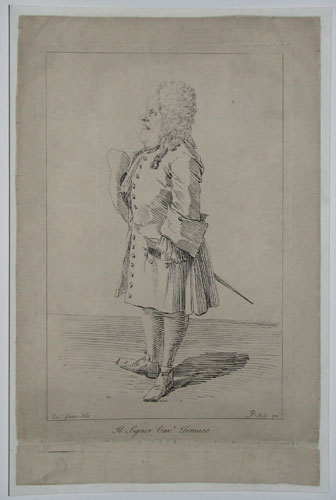
Caricature of Sir Thomas Dereham engraved by Arthur Pond and published in 1741

Dereham moved to Rome where he acted on behalf of the Old Pretender, James Francis Edward Stuart, known as James III to his supporters, in dealings with Pope Clement XII and the local English community who supported the Stuart cause. For many years Dereham was a close friend of Clement XII and his nephew, Cardinal Andrea Corsini. In March 1733 Baron Philipp von Stosch, a resident of Rome who was paid to report on events to the English government, wrote that, "Sir Thomas Dereham is playing the part of the Pope's favourite, and is extremely influential with Cardinal Corsini." Stosch said he acted as a Minister and considered that he was "protector of the British nation."

=== Scientific interests ===
Dereham became a Fellow of the Royal Society in 1720. He sent regular reports on Italian science from Italy to the Royal Society. In 1722 he entered into a correspondence with James Jurin, secretary of the Royal Society, and with Sir Isaac Newton, President of the Society, in which he offered to act as an intermediary in "opening a Philosophical Communication between two nations, among both which have been, & are so many generous spirits, as you say, united in the same noble design, for the common benefit, & information of mankind." He reported on the development of the Academy of the Institute of Sciences and the Arts of Bologna, recently founded by Luigi Ferdinando Marsigli, and of the society being developed in Milan, promoted by Celia Grillo Borromeo. Dereham undertook a translation into Italian of the Philosophical Transactions of the Royal Society, whose first volume appeared in 1729.

Dereham assisted when a decision was made in 1739 to place orders with the London-based instrument maker Jonathan Sisson for a 3 feet (0.91 m) telescope, a 3 feet (0.91 m) mural quadrant and a 2 feet (0.61 m) portable quadrant for the Bologna Institute of Science.

=== Death ===
He died unmarried in Rome on 16 January 1739 aged sixty-five, and was buried in the Venerable English College, in Rome (San Tommaso di Canterbury (Rome)), where survives his monument sculpted by Della Valle (1698-1768) and Ferdinando Fuga (1699 – 1782). He left an endowment to be administered by the "de Propaganda Fide" college in Rome to support to English students as Roman Catholic missionaries in Rome.

Baronetage of England
| Preceded by Richard Dereham | Baronet (of West Dereham); 1710–1739 | Extinct |
