= St Winwaloe's Church =

St Winwaloe's Church may refer to:

- St Winwaloe's Church, Gunwalloe, a parish church in Cornwall, England
- St Winwaloe's Church, Poundstock, a parish church in Cornwall, England

== See also ==
- St Winwaloe's Priory, a former priory in Norfolk, England
- St Wynwallow's Church, Landewednack, a parish church in Cornwall, England
