= Richard Dereham =

Richard Dereham may refer to:

- Richard Dereham (Cambridge), List of chancellors of the University of Cambridge
- Sir Richard Dereham, 3rd Baronet (1644–c. 1710) of the Dereham baronets

== See also ==
- Dereham (surname)
