= Derek Klein =

- Born: April 1954
- Died: May 2024 (aged 70); Norwich
- Education: Westminster School
- Occupations: Accountant and stamp dealer
- Known for: Fraud

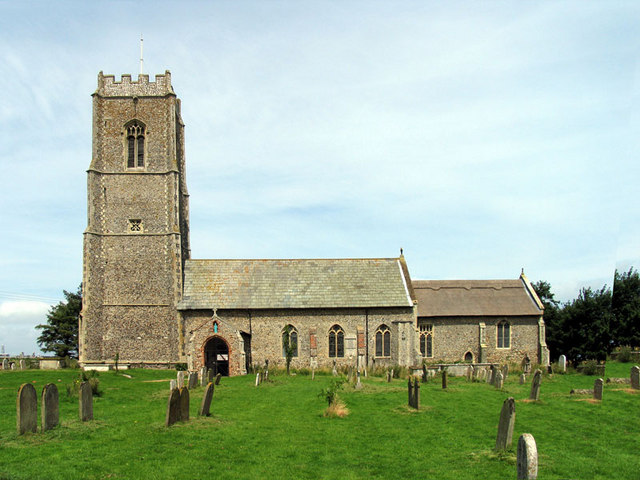
St Andrew's Church, Bacton

Derek Klein (April 1954 – May 2024) was a British postage stamp dealer, collector and accountant, who spent 16 months in jail in 2007-08 for stealing over decades, as their treasurer, £70,000 from two church parishes in Norfolk. In an unusual court ruling, the judge at his trial allowed him to repay the money he had stolen through the gradual piecemeal sale of the stamps he had bought with the proceeds of his fraud, instead of potentially yielding less at auction.

== Fraud ==
Over a period of 14 years, Klein stole about £13,000 from St Peter's in Ridlington and £57,000 from St Andrew's in Bacton, both in Norfolk, England. He was treasurer of both churches.

He used the money for "an internet gambling addiction and his obsession with stamps". In the preceding years he had gambled £350,000 and lost 90% of it. It was heard in court that Klein's nickname on one of the internet gambling sites he used was "The Bishop".

In 2008, Klein pleaded guilty at his trial at Norwich Crown Court. He persuaded the judge, who had wanted to sell Klein's entire collection at auction, to let him sell it piecemeal on online auction site eBay, saying that he could raise four times as much. In 2013, the decision was vindicated when Klein finished paying off his debt. Had Klein not been successful, he would have had to spend two more years in prison. He said after his trial "It was never my intention to deprive the churches of the money on a permanent basis. Unfortunately, my side of the story did not really come out in court because I pleaded guilty."

Klein's collection of 100,000 first day covers weighed about three tons.
