= Fersfield =

Village in Norfolk, England

Coordinates: 52.4034°N 1.0341°E

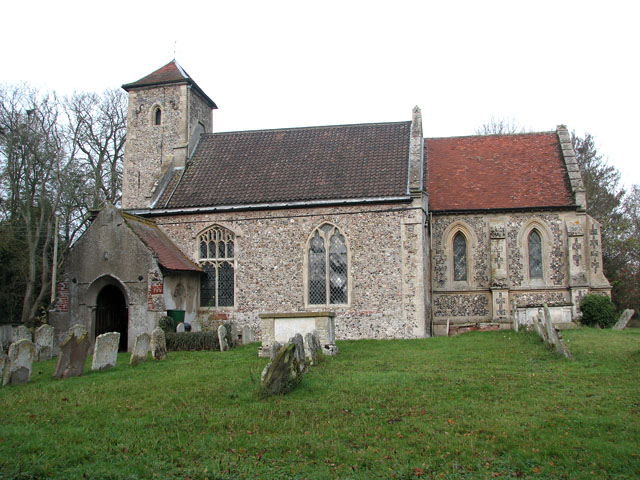
- St Andrew's Church

- Location within Norfolk
- OS grid reference: TM064827
- Civil parish: Bressingham
- District: South Norfolk
- Shire county: Norfolk
- Region: East
- Country: England
- Sovereign state: United Kingdom
- Post town: DISS
- Postcode district: IP22
- Dialling code: 01379
- Police: Norfolk
- Fire: Norfolk
- Ambulance: East of England
- UK Parliament: Waveney Valley

Fersfield is a village and former civil parish, now in the parish of Bressingham, in the South Norfolk district, in the English county of Norfolk.

Fersfield is located 3.8 miles (6.1 km) north-west of Diss and 19 miles (31 km) south-west of Norwich.

== History ==
Fersfield's name is of Anglo-Saxon origin and derives from the Old English for an area of open land where heifers were kept.

In the Domesday Book, Fersfield is listed as a settlement of 26 households in the hundred of Diss. In 1086, the village was divided between the East Anglian estates of King William I and Robert Malet.

In 1705, the antiquarian and historian Reverend Francis Blomefield was born in Fersfield. He served as Rector of Fersfield from 1729 until his death in 1752, during which time he wrote a comprehensive history of Norfolk and discovered some of the Paston Letters. Blomefield lived for most of his life in the Old Rectory.

In 1868, The Crown (a pub) opened in Fersfield which became incredibly popular with Irish workers building RAF Fersfield during the Second World War; the pub eventually closed in 1956.

On 1 April 1935 the parish was abolished and merged with Bressingham.

== Geography ==
In 1931 the parish had a population of 194, this was the last time separate population statistics for Fersfield were collected as the parish was merged into Bressingham in 1935.

== St. Andrew's Church ==
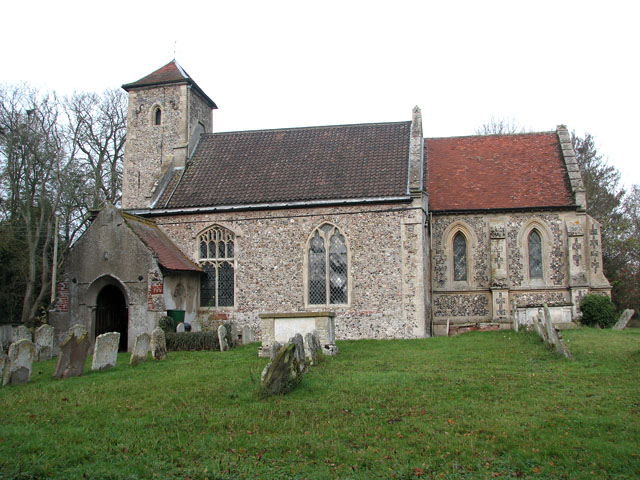
St Andrew's church

Fersfield's church is dedicated to Saint Andrew with the exterior dating from the Fourteenth and Fifteenth Centuries, with the interior largely the product of the Nineteenth Century. St. Andrew's is located on 'The Street' within the village and has been Grade I listed since 1959.

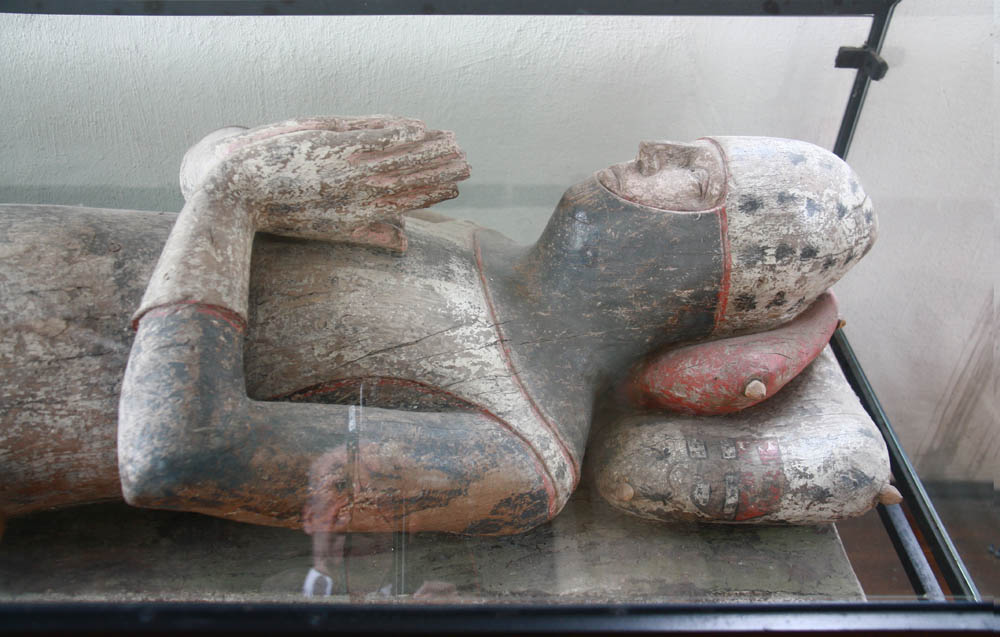
Wooden effigy of Sir Robert du Bois, retaining much of its original paint

The stained-glass inside St. Andrew's takes the form of several roundels, likely from the Continent, depicting Saint Andrew, Saint Gregory and the Eagle of Saint John. The font dates from the Norman Conquest with St. Andrew's also holding memorials to the Norman knight, Robert du Bois and the English antiquarian and historian, Francis Blomefield. The church also has a set of royal arms from the reign of Queen Anne.

== RAF Fersfield ==
RAF Fersfield was built in 1943 for use by various formations from the Royal Air Force and the United States Army Air Forces on strategic-bombing missions of Continental Europe. Fersfield was the departure site for the mission that led to the death of Lt. Joseph P. Kennedy, Jr., the brother of future U.S. President, John F. Kennedy. After the Second World War, RAF Fersfield was briefly used as a venue for motor racing until it reverted to agricultural use.

== Governance ==
Fersfield is part of the electoral ward of Bressingham & Burston for local elections and is part of the district of South Norfolk.

The village's national constituency is Waveney Valley which has been represented by the Green Party's Adrian Ramsay since 2024.

== Notable residents ==
- Francis Blomefield (1705–1752) – Rector of Fersfield, antiquarian and historian

== War Memorial ==
Fersfield's war memorial takes the form of a Celtic cross atop a square plinth located in St. Andrew's Churchyard. Fundraising for the memorial was led by Rev. C. E. Woode and it was unveiled on 13 February 1921, in the presence of a Colonel Mornement and Bertram Pollock, Bishop of Norwich. The memorial lists the following names for the First World War:

Rank	Name	Unit	Date of death	Burial/Commemoration
Cpl.	Thornton Allum	1/4th Bn., Norfolk Regiment	2 Nov. 1917	Jerusalem Memorial
Pte.	Arthur T. Vincent	1/5th Bn., Norfolk Regt.	19 May 1917	Haifa War Cemetery
Pte.	Oscar E. Anderson	7th Bn., Norfolk Regt.	3 Mar. 1919	St. Nicholas' Churchyard, Bracon Ash
Pte.	Jesse Hoskins	8th Bn., Queen's Royal Regiment	1 Jul. 1916	Thiepval Memorial
