= Francis Blomefield =

English antiquarian (1705–1752)

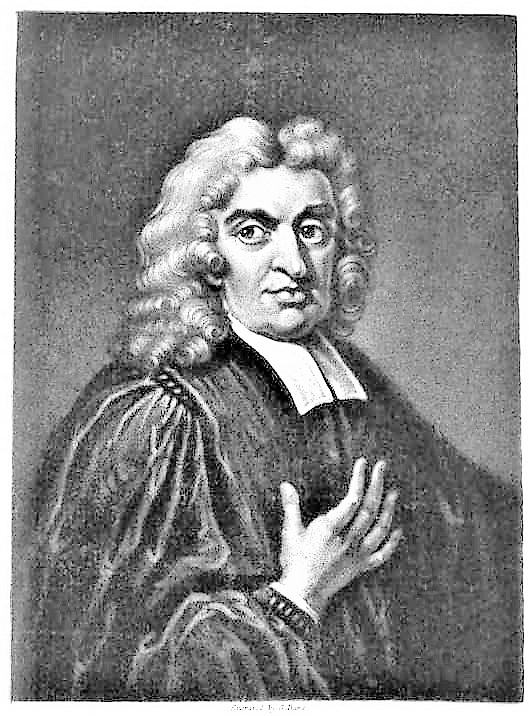
The likeness of Blomefield depicted in the form of the astronomer John Flamsteed, whom he was said to resemble, 1805 (Note: No true portrait of Blomefield exists. The portrait of Flamsteed was included as the frontispiece to the first volume of the quarto edition of An Essay Towards a Topographical History of the County of Norfolk (1805), with an appropriate disclaimer.)

Rev. Francis Blomefield (23 July 1705 – 16 January 1752), FSA, Rector of Fersfield in Norfolk, was an English antiquarian who wrote a county history of Norfolk: An Essay Towards a Topographical History of the County of Norfolk. It includes detailed accounts of the City of Norwich, the Borough of Thetford and all parishes in the southernmost Hundreds of Norfolk, but he died before completing it. This was done by a friend, Rev. Charles Parkin. The Norfolk historian Walter Rye related that although no portrait of him was known to exist, Blomefield closely resembled the astronomer John Flamsteed, whose portrait was used to depict Blomefield on the frontispiece of one of his volumes. His history of Norfolk was reissued in London in 11 volumes by William Miller in 1805–1810, the last seven being by Parkin.

== Origins ==
Francis Blomefield was born in the parish of Fersfield in the south of Norfolk on 23 July 1705, the eldest son of Henry Blomefield (1680-1732) of Winley Wood and Marketfield (free tenements which he purchased in 1724) within that parish and manor. He was described by the Norfolk historian Walter Rye as "a gentleman of independent means" and held a share of the advowson of Fersfield, to which he presented his son in 1729. His mother was Alice Batch (1677–1729), the daughter and heiress of John Batch, of King's Lynn in Norfolk. The Blomefield family had been established at Fersfield for at least six generations and claimed descent from Sir Henry Broumflete / Bromefilde, sent in 1433 by King Henry VI as one of the delegation to the Council of Basle.

== Career ==
Blomefield was educated at the grammar schools at Diss and Thetford in Norfolk. In April 1724 he was admitted to Caius College, Cambridge, where he graduated with a Bachelor of Arts degree in 1727 and a Master of Arts degree in 1728. He was ordained a priest on 27 July 1729 by Thomas Tanner, then Chancellor of the Diocese of Norwich, later Bishop of St Asaph. Two days later, on 29 July 1729 he was appointed Rector of Hargham in Norfolk, by the patron Thomas Hare, and shortly afterwards on 13 September 1729 was appointed by his father, whose turn it was at that time as patron, as Rector of Fersfield.

As a boy of 15, Blomefield began recording monumental inscriptions from churches he visited in Norfolk, Suffolk and later Cambridgeshire. Whilst at college, he also kept genealogical and heraldic notes on local families. Soon after leaving university, he was collecting materials for an account of the antiquities of Cambridgeshire, but in 1732, this project was deferred when he was given access to the antiquary Peter Le Neve's collection of materials for the history of Norfolk by Le Neve's executor "Honest Tom" Martin.

A map of the hundreds of Norfolk during the 19th century

In July 1733, Blomefield published his proposals for An Essay towards a Topographical History of Norfolk. While collecting information for his history, he discovered some of the Paston Letters. By 1736, he was ready to begin putting the results of his researches into type, assisted by his friend Charles Parkin, Rector of Oxborough. At the end of 1739, the first volume of Blomefield’s History of Norfolk was completed; it was printed using his press at Fersfield, acquired for the purpose. The second volume, consisting of a detailed history of Norwich, was begun in 1741 and completed by 1745. The production of this volume took more than four years, and Blomefield seems to have lived in the city while it was being printed.

In 1751, Blomefield published Collectanea Cantabrigiensia, his Cambridgeshire notes. A fire is said to have destroyed the press and printing room, along with all the copies of his first volume, forcing Blomefield to start his work again.

He encountered many problems with his printers and engravers, and temporarily lost his notes for the volume about Diss Hundred when they were sent away for correction. He was two-thirds through his third volume of the history of Norfolk and had covered about 40 per cent of the county, when he contracted smallpox on a visit to London and died in Fersfield in January 1752.

== Marriage and issue ==
On 1 September 1732, Blomefield married Mary Womock, daughter of Rev. Lawrence Womock, Rector of Castor by Yarmouth in Norfolk and Vicar of Buxton, a cousin of Lawrence Womock, Bishop of St Davids. An earlier Lawrence "Womack" had been Rector of Fersfield in 1609–1642, being preceded as such by Henry Womack and succeeded by Arthur Womack. By his wife Francis Blomefield had three daughters, two of whom survived to adulthood,. The four included Elizabeth Blomefield (born 1733), and Alice Blomefield (1735–1735), who died in infancy.

== Succession ==
In 1871, Blomefield's property – worth more than £7000 – was inherited by a distant cousin, Rev. Leonard Jenyns, a clergyman and naturalist. It included 140 acres (57 hectares) of land near the town of Diss in Norfolk. As a condition of inheritance, Jenyns was required to change his surname to Blomefield.

== Completion of the History of Norfolk ==
The history of the remaining areas of Norfolk was completed by Blomefield's friend, the Rev. Charles Parkin in 1753–1765, but not in Blomefield's detailed and accurate manner. The remainder of volume 3 and two further volumes were published in King's Lynn between 1769 and 1775. The entire work was subsequently reprinted in 11 quarto volumes by the London publisher William Miller in London between 1805 and 1810.

According to Rye, Parkin died before the volumes were sent to be published – they had to be completed by "some bookseller's hack" in King's Lynn.

== Assessment ==
Blomefield's History of Norfolk was both detailed and largely reliable and comparable with the best county histories of the period. There is little doubt that in compiling his book Blomefield had frequent recourse to existing historical collections of the antiquary Peter Le Neve, John Kirkpatrick of Norwich and the Bishop of St Asaph, Thomas Tanner, his own work being to some extent one of expansion and addition, despite some extensive collections of his own.

According to Rye, writing for the Dictionary of National Biography in 1886, Blomefield's volumes are "an enduring monument of hard disinterested work, for it was wholly a labour of love, and as far as the facts chronicled it is usually very trustworthy." However, Rye also noted that Blomefield believed – and published – the fabricated accounts in a series of family histories, and that the work contained numerous errors, lacked details and failed to provide accurate etymological definitions.

David Stoker, writing for the revised Oxford Dictionary of National Biography in 2004, felt that Rye had treated Blomefield's reputation "shabbily", emphasising his personal failings and the inevitable errors and misinterpretations in his history. Stoker concludes, "Given the period and circumstances in which [Blomefield] was at work, and the immensity of his task, his was a great achievement. His weakness was in underestimating what he had taken on. There has as yet been no other history of Norfolk on a comparable scale, and it remains the standard work."

Hassell Smith and Roger Virgoe in 1994 saw Blomefield's History "one of the great county histories and... still the only major history of Norfolk.... [T]he volumes on Norwich still remain the fullest account of the development of the institutions and antiquities, secular and ecclesiastical, of the city."

== Works ==
An Essay Towards a Topographical History of the County of Norfolk containing a description of the towns, villages and hamlets, with the foundations of monasteries, churches, chapels, chantries, and other religious buildings, and an account of the ancient and present state of all the rectories, vicarages, donatives and impropriations, their former and present patrons and incumbents with their several valuations in the king's books whether discharged or not; likewise, an historical account of the castles, seats and manors, their present and ancient owners together with the epitaphs, inscriptions, and arms, in all the parish churches and chapels with several draughts of churches, monuments, arms, ancient ruins and other relicks of antiquity collected out of ledger books, registers, records, evidences, deeds, court rolls and other authentick memorials.
11 volumes published by William Miller, 1805–1810:

- Volume 1, London, 1805 (Hundreds of Diss, Shropham and Guiltcross)(archive.org text) (British History Online text)
- Volume 2, London, 1805 (Hundreds of Grimshoe, Wayland and Forehoe and Borough of Thetford) 2 (archive.org text) (British History Online text) index]
- Volume 3, London, 1806, The History of the City and County of Norwich, Part 1 (British History Online text)
- Volume 4, London, 1806, The History of the City and County of Norwich, Part 2 (archive.org text)] (British History Online text)
- Volume 5, London, 1806, Hundreds of Depwade, Earsham, Henstead and Humble (archive.org text) (British History Online text) index
- Volume 6, London, 1807 (Hundreds of South Erpingham and South Greenhoe) (British History Online text)
- Volume 7 (by Charles Parkin), London, 1807 (Hundreds of Brother Cross, Gallow, Blofield, Clackclose) (archive.org text) (British History Online text) index
- Volume 8 (by Charles Parkin), London, 1808 (Hundreds of Clavering, Eynford, Freebridge and North Erpingham) (archive.org text) (British History Online text) index
- Volume 9 (by Charles Parkin), London, 1808 (Hundreds of Freebridge, Happing, Holt, Launditch and North Greenhow (archive.org text) (British History Online text) index
- Volume 10 (by Charles Parkin), London, 1809 (Hundreds of Launditch, Loddon, Mitford, Smethdon and Taverham) (archive.org text) (British History Online text) index
- Volume 11 (by Charles Parkin), London, 1810 (Hundreds of West Flegg, East Flegg, Walsham and Tunstead) (archive.org text) (British History Online text) index

== Sources ==
- Blomefield, Francis (1805). Essay Towards A Topographical History of the County of Norfolk. Vol. 1. London: W. Miller. OCLC 4343091.
- Rye, Walter (1886). "Blomefield, Francis". Dictionary of National Biography. Vol. 5.
- Smith, Hassell; Virgoe, Roger (1994). "Norfolk". In Currie, C. R. J.; Lewis, C. P. (eds.). English County Histories: a guide. Stroud: Alan Sutton. ISBN 0-7509-0289-2.
- Stoker, David (2004). "Blomefield, Francis (1705–1752)". Oxford Dictionary of National Biography (online ed.). Oxford University Press. doi:10.1093/ref:odnb/2663. (Subscription or UK public library membership required.)
- Stoker, David (2019). "Reprinting Blomefield's 'History of Norfolk'". Norfolk Archaeology. 48: 224–230.

== External links to works ==
- History of Norfolk at British History Online
- Collectanea Cantabrigiensa (1751) at the Internet Archive
