= Beeston (surname) =

Beeston is a surname. Notable people with the surname include:

- Alfred Felix Landon Beeston (1911–1995), professor of Arabic
- Carl Beeston (born 1967), English footballer
- Christopher Beeston (c. 1579 – 1638), actor
- James Beeston (1778-?), English cricketer
- John Beeston, an alternative name of James Beeston, cricketer
- Julian Beeston, English musician
- Kevin Beeston (born 1962), Welsh businessman
- Paul Beeston (born 1945), Canadian baseball executive
- W Beeston (Middlesex cricketer) (fl. 1789–1799)
- William Beeston (c. 1606 – 1682), actor
