= Alan Bloom =

British horticulturist (1906–2005)

Alan Bloom MBE
- Born: Alan Herbert Vauser Bloom; 19 November 1906; Over, Cambridgeshire, England
- Died: 31 March 2005 (aged 98); Bressingham, Norfolk, England
- Occupation: Plantsman

Alan Herbert Vauser Bloom MBE (19 November 1906 – 31 March 2005) was a British horticulturist and steam engine enthusiast. During his life he created over 170 new varieties of hardy perennial plants. These and Alpine plants and conifers were his specialities. He invented the garden feature of freestanding island beds, set in open lawn. He wrote some 30 books and appeared on radio and television.

He was the founder of Bressingham Steam and Gardens in Norfolk, England.

== Career ==
Alan Bloom was the son of a market gardener at Over, Cambridgeshire. Aged seventeen he left school and learned his craft working in various nurseries. In 1926 aged twenty he rejoined his father at Oakington, transforming the family business to a wholesale nursery. Four years later, Blooms Nurseries had become one of the largest English nurseries of its kind. He exhibited at the Royal Horticultural Society's Chelsea Flower Show for the first time in 1931, and was awarded the Society's Victoria Medal of Honour in 1972.

During World War II he grew crops in the fens. In 1946 he purchased Bressingham Hall and 228 acres (0.92 km^{2}) of land at Bressingham. In September 1947, following a destructive gale in March, he left this for Vancouver Island, with his partner Violet Holt, his children and their half sister Phillipa (Ship Aquitania dep 8 September 1948); leaving the Bressingham nursery in the hands of an agent but returned twenty months later. Between 1950 and 1962 he continued to develop Bressingham Gardens.

In 1962 he began to collect steam engines, some of which had been recently retired from British Railways. His two sons Robert and Adrian, from his marriage to Doris Heavens, joined him in the nursery business. In 1968 they opened the Bressingham Steam Museum alongside the nursery.

In 1985 they began the Blooms of Bressingham company, which expanded worldwide with heathers and conifers alongside the core perennial production business. In 1995 Robert Bloom was killed in a car accident. The Garden centre was taken over and merged with the larger Wyevale chain of garden centres. The Blooms of Bressingham nursery was sold to Meredith and Sons Blooms Ltd, which gradually abandoned the large nursery area, whilst the original perennial nursery continues today to be part of the Bloom family business 'Blooms nurseries Ltd', as do the gardens, which were mainly developed by Adrian Bloom from 1963 onwards, expanding them to 17 acres.

== Awards ==
- 1997 – MBE
- 1971 – Victoria Medal
- Veitch Memorial Medal

== Bibliography ==
The Farm in the Fen, 1944
Hardy plants of Distinction, W.H. Collingridge Ltd, 1965,
The Fens, 1953,
The Skaters of the Fens, 1958,
"Hardy Perennials", Faber & Faber Ltd, 1957,
"Perennials for trouble-free Gardening", Faber & Faber, 1960,
"Alpines for trouble-free Gardening", Faber & Faber, 1961,
"Alpine Plants of Distinction", Collingridge Books, 1968,
Alan Bloom's Hardy Perennials, 1991, Anova Books, ISBN 0-7136-8039-3
Alan Bloom's Selected Garden Plants, 1968, Jarrold Publishing, ISBN 0-85306-040-1
Alpines for Your Garden, Intl Specialized Book Service Inc, 1980, ISBN 0-938804-01-4
Bicker's Broad, Bretland Studios Ltd, ISBN 0-904774-00-7 (with Tim Hunt)
Blooms of Bressingham: Choosing the Best Hardy Plants for Your Garden, HarperCollins Publishers Limited, ISBN 0-00-412329-8 (with Adrian Bloom)
Come You Here, Boy!: Autobiography of a Gardener, Aidan Publishing, Ellis, ISBN 0-85628-260-X
Garden Alpines, Aidan Publishing, Ellis, 1994, ISBN 0-85628-254-5
Hardy Plants and Alpines, Burall Floraprint, Limited, ISBN 0-903001-62-4
Locomotives of British Railways, Jarrold Publishing, ISBN 0-85306-939-5
Locomotives of the London and North Eastern Railway, Jarrold Publishing, ISBN 0-85306-920-4 (with D. C. Williams)
Locomotives of the Southern Railway, Jarrold Publishing, ISBN 0-85306-886-0
Locomotives of the Great Western Railway, Jarrold Publishing, ISBN 0-85306-837-2
Making the Best of Alpines, Burall Floraprint, Limited, 1975, ISBN 0-903001-07-1
Moisture Gardening, Faber & Faber, Limited, 1966 ISBN 0-571-06904-5
Perennials for Your Garden, Scribner, ISBN 0-684-13952-9
Perennials in Island Beds, Faber & Faber, Limited, 1977, ISBN 0-571-10892-X
A Plantsman's Perspective: Plants, People and Places, HarperCollins Publishers Limited, ISBN 0-00-412262-3
Plantsman's Progress, Dalton Limited, Terence, ISBN 0-900963-67-0
Prelude to Bressingham, Dalton Limited, Terence, ISBN 0-900963-60-3
Steam Alive: The Story of Bressingham Steam Museum, Picton Publishing, ISBN 0-948251-56-5
Steam Engines at Bressingham: The Story of a Live Steam Museum, Faber & Faber, Limited, ISBN 0-571-10867-9
Two Hundred Fifty Years of Steam, I P C Science & Technology Press, Limited, ISBN 0-437-01400-2
Your Book of Traction Engines, Faber & Faber, Limited, ISBN 0-571-10413-4
