= Ridlington, Norfolk =

Village in Norfolk, England

Coordinates: 52.82605°N 1.4817°E

Ridlington
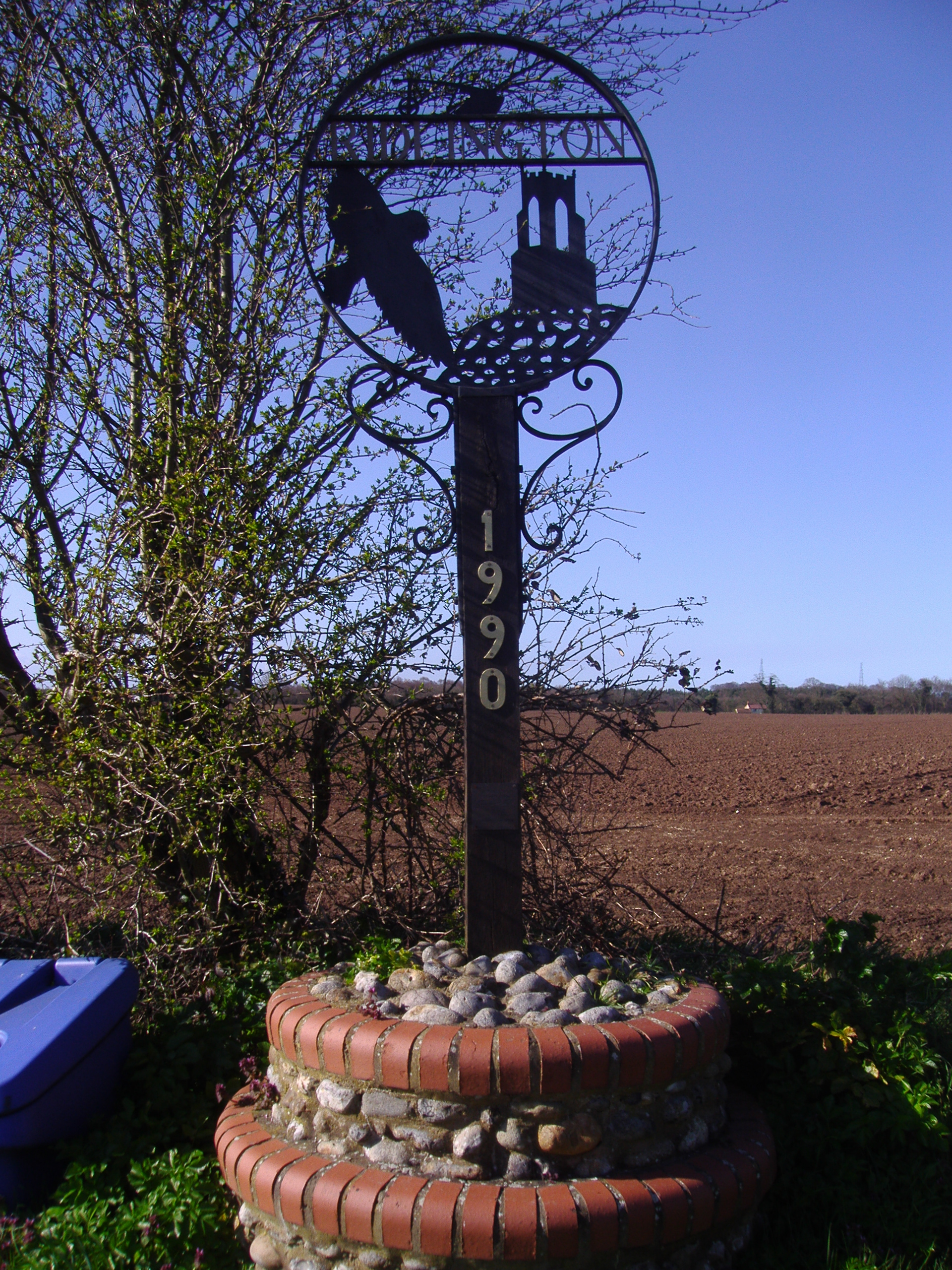
- The Village sign

- Location within Norfolk
  - London: 138 miles (222 km)
- Civil parish: Witton
- District: North Norfolk
- Shire county: Norfolk
- Region: East
- Country: England
- Sovereign state: United Kingdom
- Post town: NORTH WALSHAM
- Postcode district: NR28
- Dialling code: 01692
- Police: Norfolk
- Fire: Norfolk
- Ambulance: East of England

Ridlington is a village and former civil parish, now in the parish of Witton, in the North Norfolk district, in the county of Norfolk, England. The village is 19.7 miles (31.7 km) north-east of Norwich, 13 miles (21 km) south east of Cromer and 138 miles (222 km) north-east of London. The village lies 4.6 miles (7.4 km) east of the town of North Walsham.The nearest railway station is at North Walsham for the Bittern Line which runs between Cromer and Norwich. The nearest airport is Norwich International Airport. The civil parish was merged into Witton on 1 April 1935. In 1931 the civil parish had a population of 180.

== Description ==
The village of Ridlington is in the eastern part of the large parish of Witton. The name Ridlington is thought to derive from the Old English for Hrethel’s people’s enclosure. The village is surrounded by land largely in arable use. Many of the fields were owned by a single landowner, John Owles.

=== The Domesday Book ===
Ridlington has an entry in the Domesday Book of 1085 where its population, land ownership and productive resources were extensively detailed along with the other settlement of Witton In the survey Ridlington is recorded by the name of Ridlinketuna, in the hundred of Tunstead. The main tenants being Ranulf brother of Ilger. The survey also indicate the presence of a priest in Witton. Despite the evidence for Saxon activity in Witton, the settlement does not appear to have been particularly populous or valuable, and Ridlington even less so. Despite the mention of a priest, there is no listing of a church or chapel in the settlements.

The Church of St Peter Ridlington

The exquisite tower, with its four Evangelist pinnacles, was built by Thomas Stacy, who died 11 April 1411.

The General History of Norfolk 1829, by John Stacy, records his tomb in the chancel, with a brass plate inscribed:

Presbyter hic stratus quidam jacet intumulatus Vir bonus et gratus Thomas Stacy vocitatus Cantor Subtilis pueris Magnus Relevator Et Campanilis, Ridlington, erat fabricator M.Anno C. quator bis XI, ruit iste Luce bis X et I April stet sibi Christe . Amen

Translated:

A Priest lies here A good and generous man called Thomas Stacy A great singer and child of the Redeemer And he was the builder of Ridlington Bell Tower In 1411, he stood before Christ on 11 April. Amen

The inscription was lost when a German Zeppelin bomb damaged the Chancel end of the Church, around midnight on 24/25 April 1916.

== Gallery ==
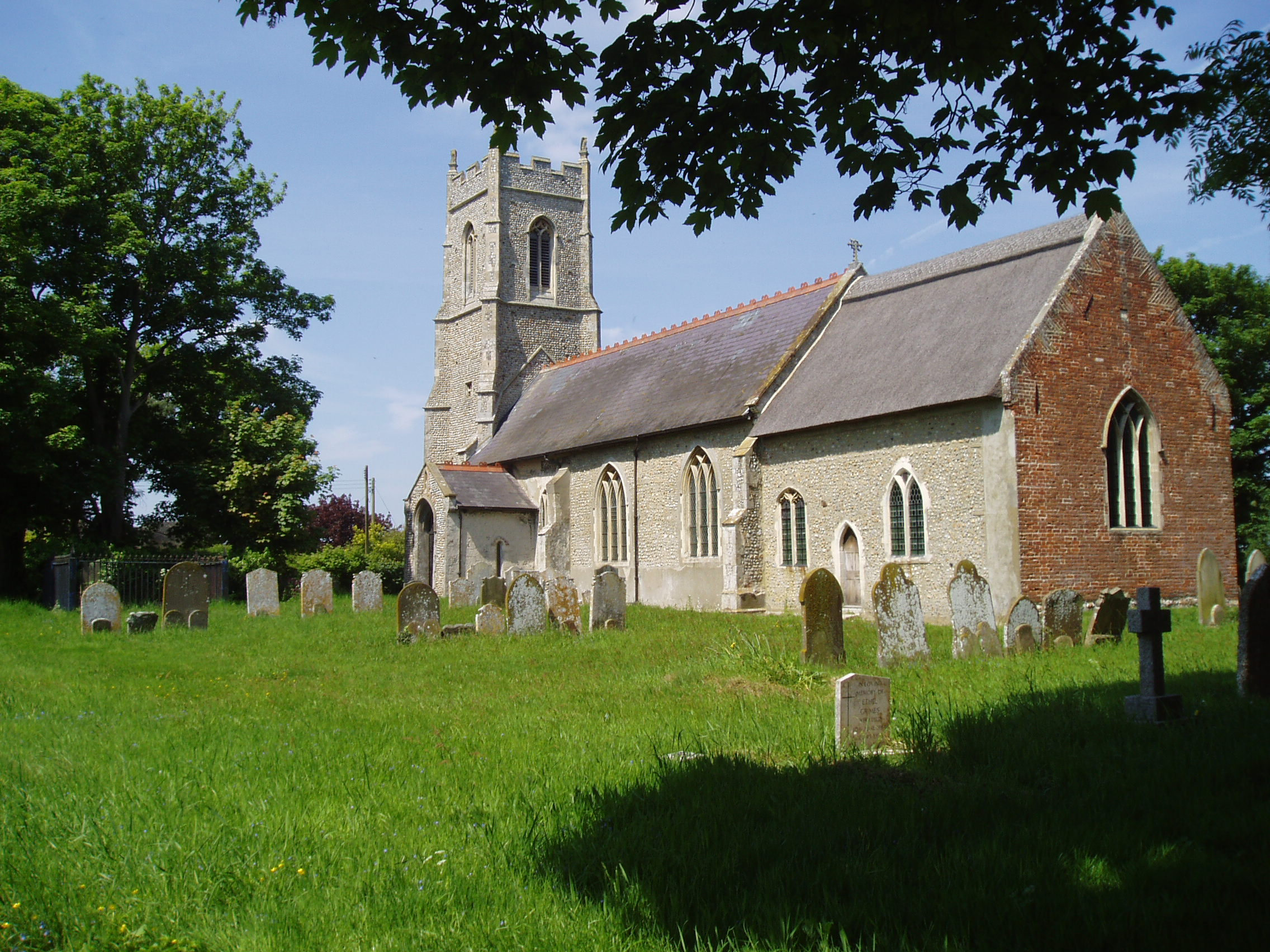
parish church of Saint Peter, Ridlington
