= Quarles =

Quarles is a surname, and may refer to:

- Benjamin Arthur Quarles (1904–1996), historian, administrator, scholar, educator
- Christina Quarles (born 1985), artist
- Donald A. Quarles (1894–1959), communications engineer, executive
- Francis Quarles (1592–1644), poet
- Greenfield Quarles (1847–1921), soldier, judge
- James Minor Quarles (1823–1901), American politician
- John Quarles (1624–1665), poet
- Joseph V. Quarles (1843–1911), American politician
- Julian Minor Quarles (1848–1929), American politician
- Nancy L. Quarles (born 1951), American politician
- Randal Quarles (born 1957), managing director
- Ryan Quarles (born 1983), American politician
- Shelton Quarles (born 1971), sportsman
- Tunstal Quarles (1781–1856)
- William Andrew Quarles (1825–1893), American lawyer, politician, railroad executive from Tennessee
- William D. Quarles Jr. (born 1948), American jurist
- William Quarles (cricketer) (1800–1879), English cricketer
- Quarles, Quarles de Quarles or Quarles van Ufford, a Dutch noble family of English descent.

Quarles was a pseudonym used by Edgar Allan Poe for 'The Raven'.

Quarles is a place, and may refer to:

- Quarles, Norfolk, England
- Quarles, Missouri, United States
- Quarles Range, a mountain range in Antarctica

== See also ==
- Quarles & Brady LLP, U.S. law firm
- New York v. Quarles, a 1984 U.S. Supreme Court case
