= Witton, North Norfolk =

Village in Norfolk, England

Coordinates: 52.82838°N 1.47207°E

Witton
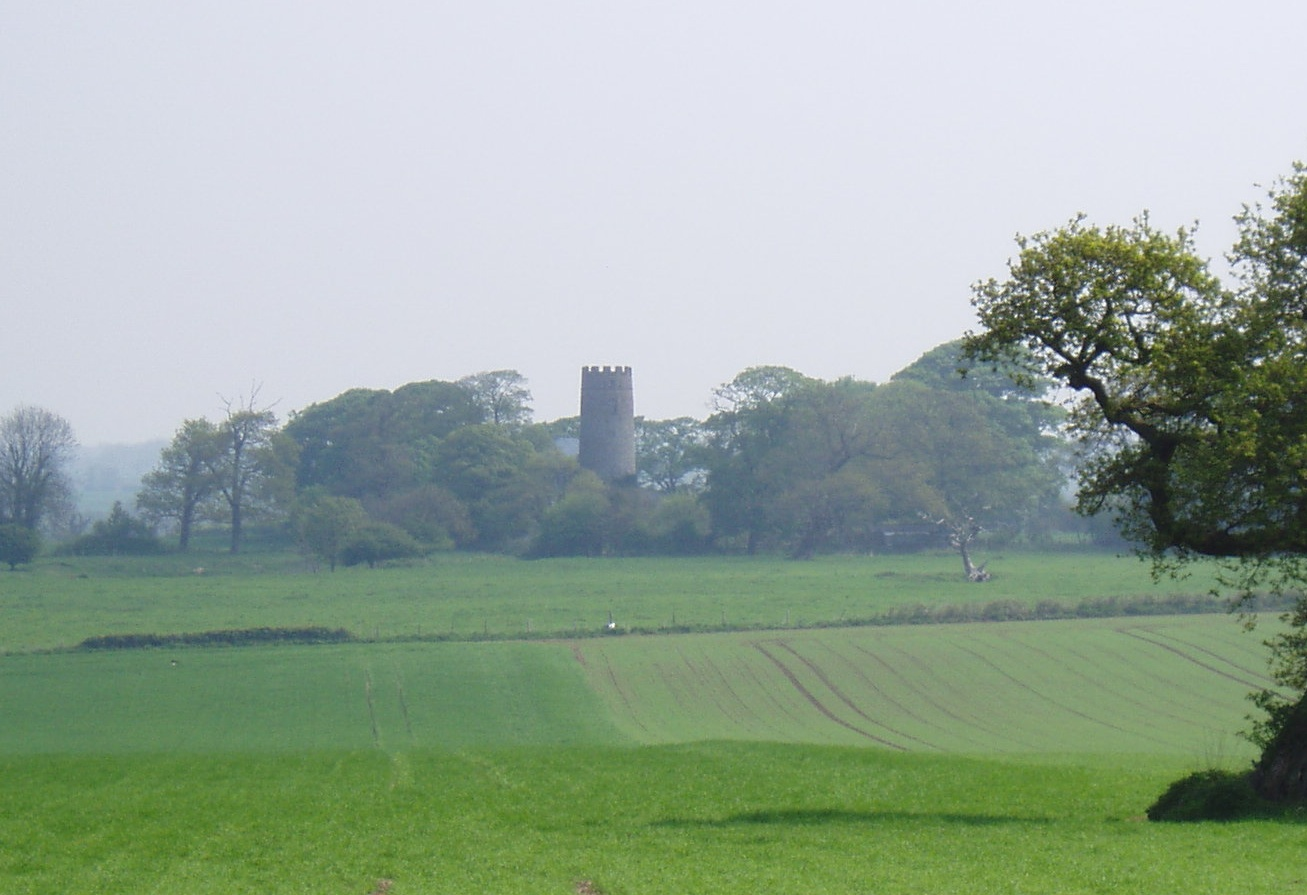
- A view of Witton Church

- Location within Norfolk
- Area: 9.77 km^{2} (3.77 sq mi)
- Population: 318 (2011)
  - Density: 33/km^{2} (85/sq mi)
- OS grid reference: TG340313
- Civil parish: Witton
- District: North Norfolk
- Shire county: Norfolk
- Region: East
- Country: England
- Sovereign state: United Kingdom
- Post town: NORTH WALSHAM
- Postcode district: NR28
- Police: Norfolk
- Fire: Norfolk
- Ambulance: East of England

Witton is a village and civil parish in the English county of Norfolk. It is located 8 km (5.0 mi) east of the town of North Walsham and 30 km (19 mi) north of the city of Norwich. It should not be confused with the quite different Norfolk village of similar name in the parish of Postwick with Witton, some 8 km (5.0 mi) east of Norwich.

The villages name means 'wood farm/settlement'.

The civil parish (officially known as Witton) also includes the village of Ridlington and has an area of 9.77 km^{2} (3.77 sq mi) and in the 2001 census had a population of 298 in 134 households, increasing to a population of 318 in 141 households at the 2011 Census. For the purposes of local government, the parish falls within the district of North Norfolk.

The parish church of St. Margaret has a round tower, making it one of the many round-towered churches in Norfolk and Suffolk.
