= Bittering, Norfolk =

Hamlet in Norfolk, England

Coordinates: 52.720°N 0.875°E

Bittering
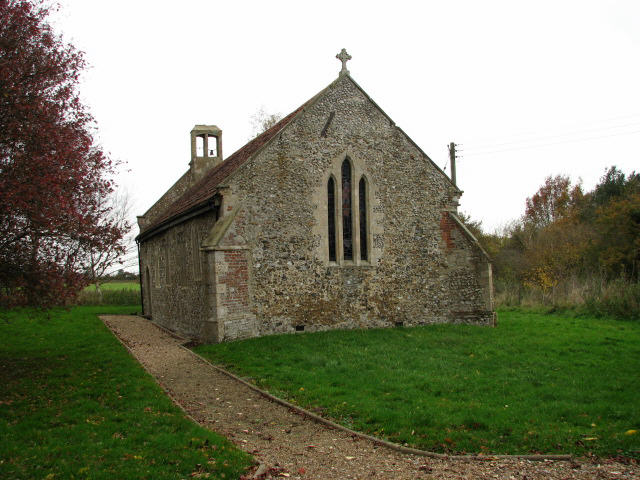
- St Peter's church

- Location within Norfolk
- OS grid reference: TF9389817569
- Civil parish: Beeston with Bittering
- District: Breckland
- Shire county: Norfolk
- Region: East
- Country: England
- Sovereign state: United Kingdom
- Post town: Dereham
- Postcode district: NR19
- Dialling code: 01362
- UK Parliament: Mid Norfolk

Bittering is a hamlet and former civil parish in the English county of Norfolk. It is the site of a deserted medieval village and now forms part of the civil parish of Beeston with Bittering in Breckland District. It is around 2 miles (3.2 km) north-east of Beeston, 4 miles (6.4 km) north-west of Dereham, and 19 miles (31 km) north-west of Norwich.

== History ==
In the Domesday Book of 1086, Bittering was listed as a settlement of six households in the hundred of Laundich and was part of the estates of William the Conqueror. The deserted medieval village site of Little Bittering, also known as Bittering Parva, includes a number of earthworks and moated sites and is a scheduled monument. The village, which is to the north of the course of a Roman road, was small, with less than ten households in 1428, and by the middle of the 16th century the village was essentially depopulated; by the beginning of the 17th century the church was recorded as having only nine communicants. The site of Great Bittering is also depopulated. Now forming part of Gressenhall, the village church was lost by the early 16th century.

A moated, medieval manor house stood close to the seat of the deserted village. This was demolished and Manor House, a farm house dating from around 1700, built on the site. Bittering Hall was built in the 19th century to the south of the site of the former village. It was demolished in the late 20th century, and the site has since been used for gravel and sand quarrying.

The parish was combined with Beeston in the early 20th century.

== Churches ==
The former parish church is dedicated to St Peter and St Paul. It dates from the 12th-century and includes a medieval rood screen and a 13th-century font. The church was considered to be "derelict" by 1954 but was restored and, although declared redundant in the 1970s, occasional services are held in the building. The building is Grade II* listed.

Close to the former village site, in Spread Oak Wood, is a small Roman Catholic chapel constructed by Paul Hodác, originally from Czechoslovakia. The building was built during the 1970s and 80s and first used for mass in 1983. Hodác died in 2002 and the land is now owned by an aggregates company.

== Governance ==
Bittering is part of the electoral ward of Launditch for local elections and is part of the district of Breckland. It falls within the Mid Norfolk parliamentary constituency.

== Notes ==
- Francis White, History, Gazetteer, and Directory, of Norfolk (1845, reprinted 1969) pp. 327–329
