= Beeston with Bittering =

Civil parish in the Breckland district of Norfolk, England

Coordinates: 52.714°N 0.840°E

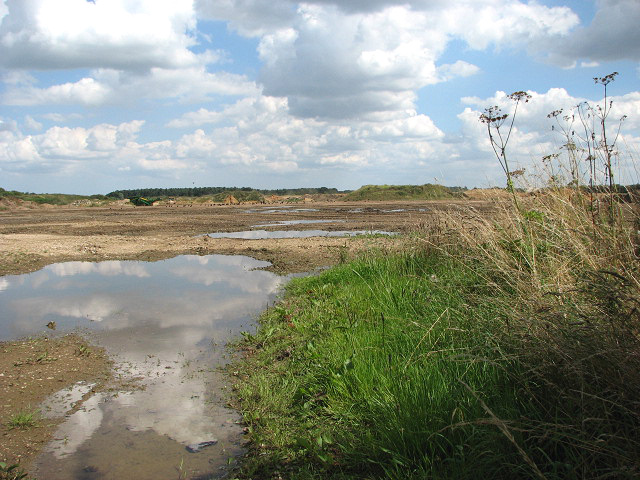
- Sand and gravel extraction site

- Location within Norfolk
- Area: 10.80 km^{2} (4.17 sq mi)
- Population: 505 (2001 census); 566 (2011)
  - Density: 47/km^{2} (120/sq mi)
- OS grid reference: TF919166
- District: Breckland
- Shire county: Norfolk
- Region: East
- Country: England
- Sovereign state: United Kingdom
- Post town: KING'S LYNN
- Postcode district: PE32
- Police: Norfolk
- Fire: Norfolk
- Ambulance: East of England

Beeston with Bittering is a civil parish in the Breckland district of Norfolk, England. According to the 2001 census it had a population of 505, increasing to 566 at the 2011 census. It includes the village of Beeston and the former parish of Bittering.
