= James Beeston =

English cricketer

James Beeston (born 17 September 1778) was an English professional cricketer who made 24 known appearances in historically important matches from 1794 to 1808. He was mainly associated with Middlesex.

== Bibliography ==
- Haygarth, Arthur (1996) [1862]. Scores & Biographies, Volume 1 (1744–1826). Kennington: Frederick Lillywhite. ISBN 978-19-00592-23-9.
