= West Dereham Abbey =

Monastery in Norfolk, England

Coordinates: 52.5781°N 0.4503°E

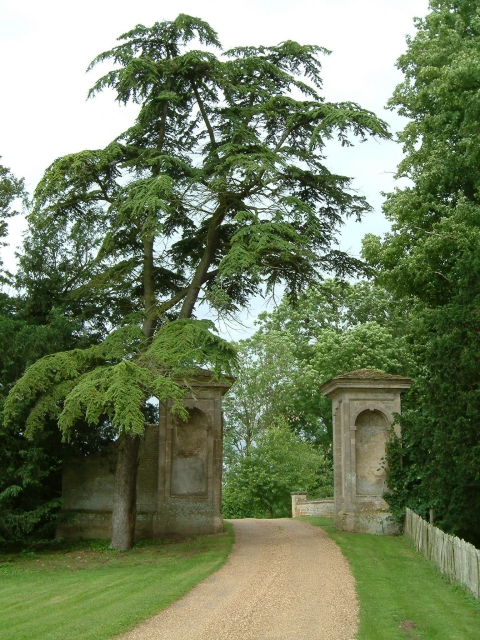
Gate piers to St Mary's Abbey (1697)

West Dereham Abbey was an abbey in Norfolk, England.

St Mary's Abbey, West Dereham, was founded in 1188 by Hubert Walter, Dean of York, at his birthplace. It was to be a daughter house of Welbeck Abbey, Nottinghamshire, for canons regular of the Premonstratensian order.
The canons were to pray for the souls of the founder and his parents, his brothers and sisters and all his relatives and friends. It was surrounded by a moat and was to become one of the larger religious houses in Norfolk, with up to twenty six canons in the late 13th century, and was also quite wealthy, with extensive estates.

The last recorded Bishop's visitation took place 10 August 1503. Bishop Redman of Ely found several insufficiently taught; therefore he recalled Brother Robert Watton from the university, to be joined in office with the prior, and diligently to teach his brethren. Thomas Fychele was removed from the subpriorship for his negligence in his duty; otherwise the condition and discipline of the house were good.

Leading up to the Dissolution of the Monasteries, Thomas Cromwell's agent Sir John Prise reported in 1536: the canons were all lacking self-restraint, and were ready to confess themselves as such, longing to marry, and believing that the king had been divinely sent on earth to bring this about. He then in 1538 petitioned Cromwell for the lands for himself. However, following the Dissolution of the Monasteries in 1539, the site and associated lands were granted by Henry VIII to Thomas Dereham of Crimplesham.

A house built on the site in the later 16th century was altered and extended in the 1690s by Thomas Dereham on his return from Italy, where he had been envoy to the court of the Grand Duke of Tuscany. This house was largely demolished in around 1810, the remaining part being converted to a farmhouse, the ruins of which were restored in the 1990s. The remains are Grade II* listed. Almost all the abbey buildings have been demolished, but buried foundations survive and can be seen as cropmarks on aerial photographs, as can other earthworks and fishponds.
