= Bressingham =

Village in Norfolk, England

Coordinates: 52.386°N 1.049°E

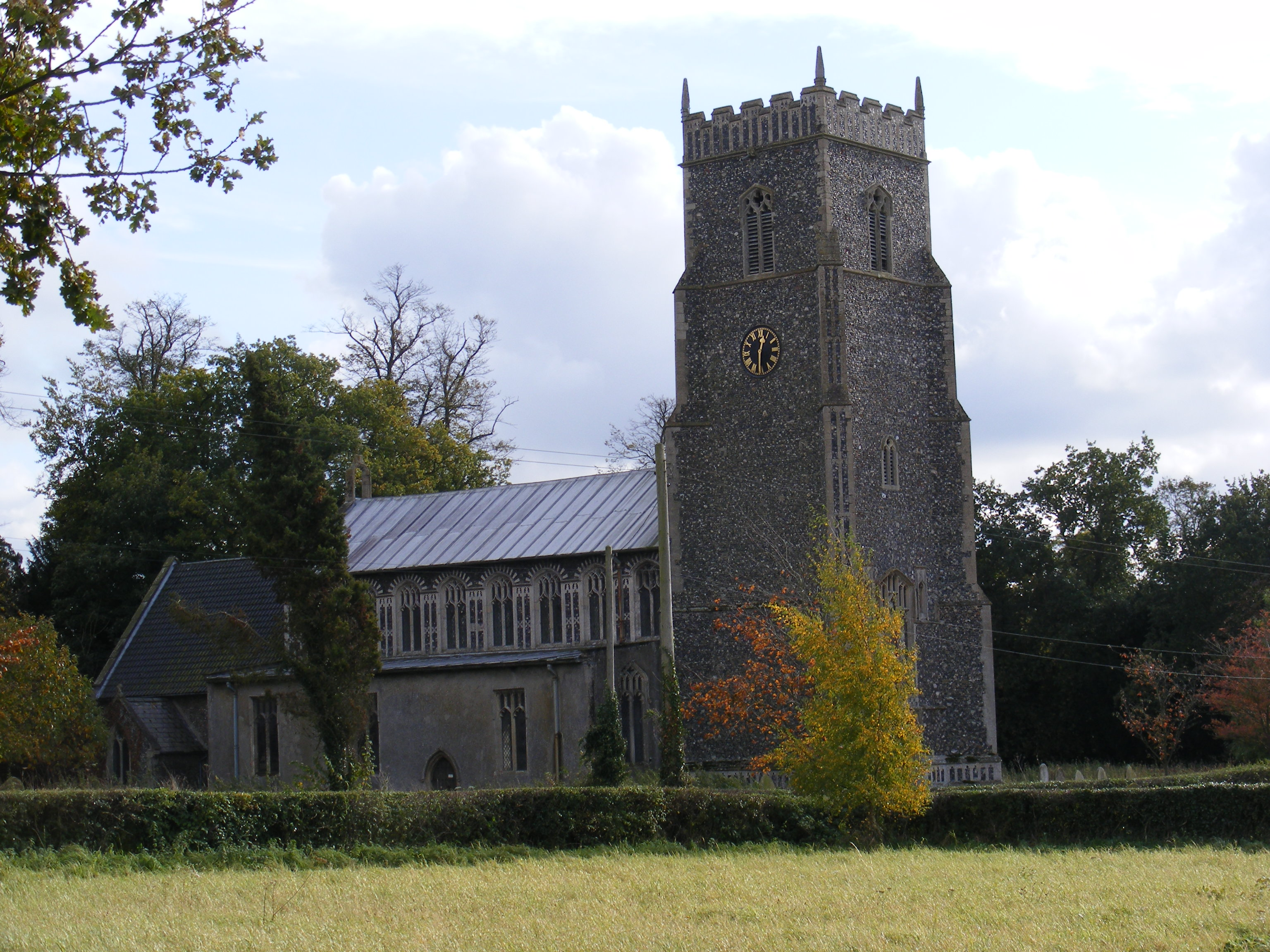
- Church of St John the Baptist, Bressingham

- Location within Norfolk
- Area: 15.76 km^{2} (6.08 sq mi)
- Population: 872 (2021)
  - Density: 55/km^{2} (140/sq mi)
- OS grid reference: TM0780
- Civil parish: Bressingham
- District: South Norfolk
- Shire county: Norfolk
- Region: East
- Country: England
- Sovereign state: United Kingdom
- Post town: DISS
- Postcode district: IP22
- Dialling code: 01379
- Police: Norfolk
- Fire: Norfolk
- Ambulance: East of England
- UK Parliament: Waveney Valley

Bressingham is a village and civil parish in the English county of Norfolk. It is 2.1 miles (3.4 km) north-west of Diss and 19 miles (31 km) south-west of Norwich.

== History ==
Bressingham's name is of Anglo-Saxon origin. It is mentioned in the Domesday Book of 1086 as consisting of 47 households, which placed it in the largest 20% of settlements. At this time, Bressingham was divided between the land of William the Conqueror (2 acres of meadow, 6 pigs and woodland) and Bury St Edmunds Abbey (16 acres of meadow, 26 pigs and woodland).

From 1804, Bressingham had a thriving Amicable Society with upwards of 30 members agreeing to a rudimentary form of life insurance. The society conducted its meetings in the Chequers pub. A Methodist chapel was built in Bressingham in 1900.

== Geography ==
Bressingham Parish is bordered to the south by the River Waveney and is bisected by the A1066 road, between Thetford and Diss. Amenities within the village include a village shop and village hall. The local playing field is operated by Diss Town Football Club.

According to the 2021 census, Bressingham has a population of 872 people which shows a slight decrease from the 887 people recorded in the 2011 census.

== Church of St John the Baptist ==
Bressingham's parish church is dedicated to John the Baptist and was constructed in the late-13th century. The church was significantly remodelled in the 16th and 19th centuries and boasts both elaborate pew carvings, which have been damaged by iconoclasts in the 16th century and stained glass installed by J & J King. Additionally, within the church there is a set of royal arms dating from the reign of King Charles II and a 19th-century funeral bier. The building is Grade I.

== Bressingham Steam and Gardens ==
Bressingham Steam Museum and Gardens is located within the village. Established by Alan Bloom in the 1940s, the gardens were later developed to include several narrow gauge railway lines with a number of different types of steam engines and vehicles. It is also the home of a Dad's Army exhibition.

== Governance ==
Bressingham is part of the electoral ward of Bressingham and Burston for local elections and is part of the district of South Norfolk. It is part of the Waveney Valley parliamentary constituency.
