= Shouldham Thorpe =

Village in Norfolk, England

Coordinates: 52.645°N 0.455°E

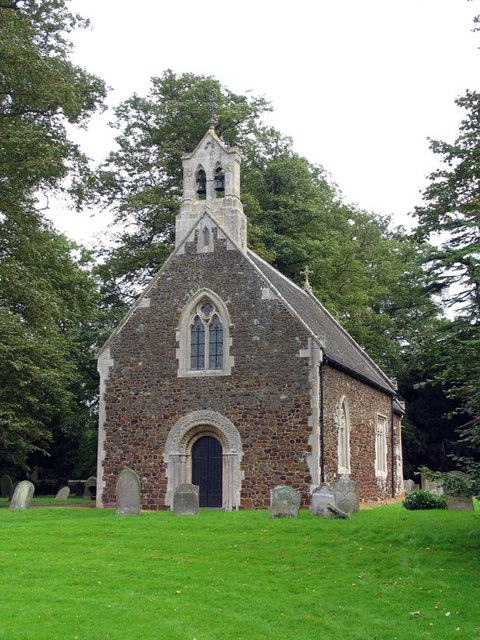
- St Mary the Virgin, Shouldham Thorpe

- Location within Norfolk
- Area: 5.87 km^{2} (2.27 sq mi)
- Population: 165
  - Density: 28/km^{2} (73/sq mi)
- OS grid reference: TF661080
- Civil parish: Shouldham Thorpe
- District: King's Lynn and West Norfolk
- Shire county: Norfolk
- Region: East
- Country: England
- Sovereign state: United Kingdom
- Post town: KING'S LYNN
- Postcode district: PE33
- Police: Norfolk
- Fire: Norfolk
- Ambulance: East of England

Shouldham Thorpe is a village and civil parish in the English county of Norfolk. It covers an area of 5.87 km^{2} (2.27 sq mi) and had a population of 157 in 66 households at the 2001 census, the population increasing to 165 at the 2011 Census. For the purposes of local government, it falls within the district of King's Lynn and West Norfolk. It contains a church (St Mary the Virgin) also in picture.

The villages name means 'Shouldham's outlying farm/settlement'. Shouldham meaning 'homestead/village with an obligation'.

Fodderston Mill was built in 1830 and worked until c.1904. The tower survives, converted to residential use.

== Notes ==
http://kepn.nottingham.ac.uk/map/place/Norfolk/Shouldham%20Thorpe http://kepn.nottingham.ac.uk/map/place/Norfolk/Shouldham
