= Dereham baronets =

Extinct baronetcy in the Baronetage of England

The Dereham Baronetcy, of West Dereham in the County of Norfolk, was a title in the Baronetage of England. It was created on 8 June 1661 for Thomas Dereham. The fourth Baronet was a Fellow of the Royal Society. The title became extinct on his death in 1739.

== Dereham Baronets, of West Dereham (1661) ==
- Sir Thomas Dereham, 1st Baronet (c. 1600–1668)
- Sir Henry Dereham, 2nd Baronet (c. 1643–1682)
- Sir Richard Dereham, 3rd Baronet (1644–c. 1710)
- Sir Thomas Dereham, 4th Baronet (c. 1678–1739)
