= Beeston, Norfolk =

Village in the county of Norfolk, England

Coordinates: 52.708°N 0.827°E

Beeston
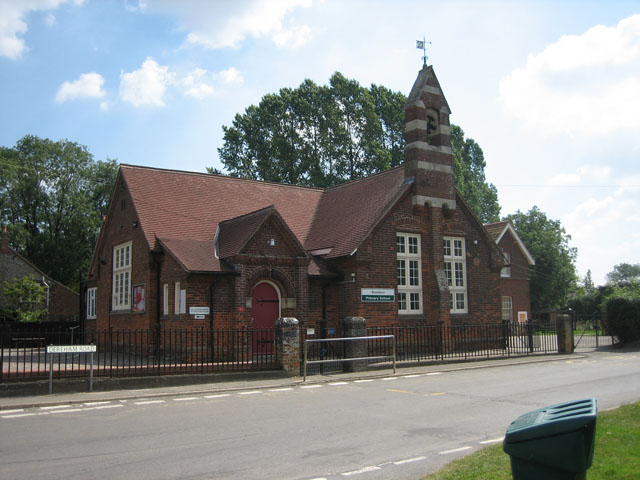
- Beeston Primary School

- Location within Norfolk
- Population: 566
- Civil parish: Beeston with Bittering
- District: Breckland
- Shire county: Norfolk
- Region: East
- Country: England
- Sovereign state: United Kingdom
- Post town: KING'S LYNN
- Postcode district: PE32
- Dialling code: 01328

Beeston is a village in the county of Norfolk, England, in the civil parish of Beeston with Bittering, west of Dereham and south of Fakenham. It may also be known as Beeston All Saints or Beeston-next-Mileham to distinguish it from the three other villages in Norfolk named Beeston.

Sir William Calthorpe made presentations to the rectory of Beeston in 1460, 1481 and 1492.

Keith Skipper, Eastern Daily Press journalist and champion of the Norfolk dialect, was born in the village.
