= Fincham =

Village in Norfolk, England

Coordinates: 52.63010°N 0.48826°E

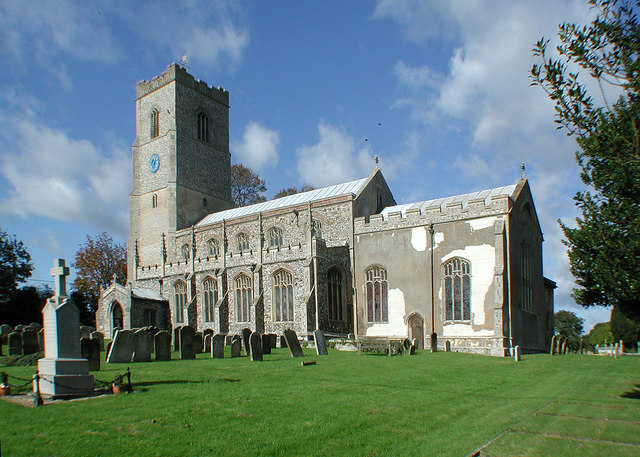
- St. Martin's Church

- Location within Norfolk
- Area: 4.65 sq mi (12.0 km^{2})
- Population: 496 (2011)
  - Density: 107/sq mi (41/km^{2})
- OS grid reference: TF685065
- District: King's Lynn and West Norfolk
- Shire county: Norfolk
- Region: East
- Country: England
- Sovereign state: United Kingdom
- Post town: KING'S LYNN
- Postcode district: PE33
- Dialling code: 01366
- Police: Norfolk
- Fire: Norfolk
- Ambulance: East of England
- UK Parliament: South West Norfolk

Fincham is a village and civil parish in the English county of Norfolk.

Fincham is located 9.4 miles (15.1 km) south of King's Lynn and 34 miles (55 km) west of Norwich.

== History ==
Fincham's name is of Anglo-Saxon origin and derives from the Old English for a homestead or settlement with an abundance of finches.

The Roman Fen Causeway once ran through Fincham meaning the parish has yielded numerous Roman artefacts including three separate hoards of silver coins, a curious figure of a hare and hound and a bust of Jupiter. The foundations of a Roman building have been discovered in the north of the parish, which have been excavated by Norfolk Heritage in the 1990s.

The parish has also yielded many artefacts from the Anglo-Saxon period including rare coins dating from the reign of King Rædwald and another that was minted in Maastricht. With later coins found dating from the reigns of King Cnut and Æthelred the Unready.

In the Domesday Book, Fincham is listed as a settlement of 164 households in the hundred of Clackclose. In 1086, the village was divided between the East Anglian estates of William de Warenne, Hermer de Ferrers, Bury St Edmunds Abbey, St. Etheldreda's Abbey, Ralph Baynard and Reginald, son of Ivo.

Fincham Hall is a manor-house dating from the Fifteenth and Sixteenth Centuries, with an earlier octagonal brick tower. Today, the hall is available for tourists to rent on Airbnb. Talbot Hall was built in Eighteenth Century and was notable for hosting an impressive collection of orchids currently displayed in Kew Botanical Gardens.

== Geography ==
According to the 2021 census, Fincham has a population of 514 people which shows an increase from the 496 people listed in the 2011 census.

Most of Fincham village is a dedicated conservation area due to its distinct rural character.

== St. Martin's Church ==
Fincham's parish church is dedicated to Saint Martin, with the exterior of the church dating from the Fifteenth Century and the interior being the remains of an extensive Nineteenth Century restoration. St. Martin's is located within the village on the High Street and has been Grade I listed since 1959. St. Martin's font is famous throughout Norfolk due to the fact it stands on four separate legs and depicts scenes from The Gospel of Christ.

Fincham once had another church, dedicated to Saint Michael, but this fell into disuse and was subsequently demolished in the mid-Nineteenth Century.

== Amenities ==
Though at one time Fincham was home to five public houses, today only one remains- 'The Swan'. The pub has stood on its current site since the late-Eighteenth Century and today operates as a freehouse.

Fincham Memorial Hall is located close to the Village Green, and is the venue for monthly car boot sales and the annual Village Fete. The hall has been severely damaged twice in recent memory, once after an illegal rave and secondly by flooding in Winter of 2010.

As of 2016, the village was home to a petrol station and a hairdressing salon.

In 2005, the Fincham Chorus was formed by people from Fincham and the surrounding area. To date, they have staged several concerts and performed at one wedding, as well as taking part in the Christmas carol services. To date, they have raised over £10,000 for St Martin's Church restoration fund.

== Governance ==
Feltwell is part of the electoral ward of Airfield for local elections and is part of the district of King's Lynn and West Norfolk

The village's national constituency is South West Norfolk which has been represented by Labour's Terry Jermy MP since 2024.

== War memorial ==
Fincham War Memorial is a square plinth topped with a crucifix, made from Portland stone and located inside St. Martin's Churchyard. The memorial was restored in 2012 with the partition chains around the memorial being stolen in 2013 and subsequently replaced. The memorial lists the following names for the First World War:

Rank	Name	Unit	Date of death	Burial/Commemoration
Lt.	William Crane	General List	13 Mar. 1918	St. Mary's Church
Sgt.	George Harvey	1st Bn., Norfolk Regiment	8 Nov. 1918	Les Baraques Cemetery
Cpl.	Philip J. Laws	9th Bn., Yorkshire Regiment	15 Jan. 1916	Calais Southern Cemetery
LCpl.	Ernest Lankfer	18th Bn., Highland Light Infantry	26 Oct. 1917	Tyne Cot
LCpl.	Sydney Bacon	1st Bn., Norfolk Regiment	19 Dec. 1914	Menin Gate
Gnr.	Bertie W. Sculpher	322nd Bty., Royal Garrison Artillery	18 Jul. 1917	Ravenna War Cemetery
Pte.	Thomas Utting	4th Bn., Bedfordshire Regiment	10 Apr. 1916	Ladywell Cemetery
Pte.	George Nelson	2nd Bn., Cheshire Regiment	15 Apr. 1918	Doiran Memorial
Pte.	Isaac Sculpher	1st Bn., Coldstream Guards	26 Jan. 1915	Cabaret-Rouge Cemetery
Pte.	Harry Jude	1st Bn., East Surrey Regiment	15 Sep. 1916	Thiepval Memorial
Pte.	Robert Secker	1st Bn., Essex Regiment	13 Aug. 1915	Helles Memorial
Pte.	Albert G. Bly	1st Bn., Norfolk Regiment	16 Jul. 1915	Étaples Military Cemetery
Pte.	Bert Bell	7th Bn., Norfolk Regt.	22 Jul. 1917	Duisans British Cemetery
Pte.	Arthur Elliott	8th Bn., Norfolk Regt.	9 Nov. 1917	Dozinghem Cemetery
Pte.	Charles R. Wilding	8th Bn., Norfolk Regt.	5 Dec. 1915	Norfolk Cemetery
Pte.	Ralph H. Bacon	9th Bn., Norfolk Regt.	21 Mar. 1918	Arras Memorial
Pte.	Jotham A. Bywater	9th Bn., Norfolk Regt.	26 Sep. 1915	Loos Memorial
Pte.	Benjamin J. Barker	6th Bn., Northamptonshire Regiment	17 Feb. 1917	Regina Trench Cemetery
Pte.	Robert R. Bellham	2nd Bn., Royal Sussex Regiment	15 Jul. 1916	Thiepval Memorial
Pte.	Fred W. E. Upshaw	2/5th Bn., West Yorkshire Regiment	20 Jul. 1918	Marfaux Cemetery
Rfn.	Percy W. Bacon	13th Bn., King's Royal Rifle Corps	21 Mar. 1918	Tyne Cot
Rfn.	John Johnson	13th Bn., K.R.R.C.	13 Jun. 1916	Thiepval Memorial

The following names were added following the Second World War:

Rank	Name	Unit	Date of death	Burial/Commemoration
FO	Hugh Mason DFM (Note: FO Mason was awarded the DFM in November 1941, likely for long service.)	No. 83 Squadron RAF	27 Apr. 1944	Durnbach War Cemetery
Cpl.	Douglas E. G. Drew	1st Bn., Suffolk Regiment	31 May 1940	Oostvleteren Churchyard
Pte.	Alan M. Lambert	1st Bn., Royal Norfolk Regiment	6 Jun. 1944	Hermanville War Cemetery
Pte.	James W. Cameron	5th Bn., Royal Norfolks	26 Jun. 1943	Kanchanaburi War Cemetery
