= Crimplesham =

Village in Norfolk, England

Coordinates: 52.60602°N 0.43520°E

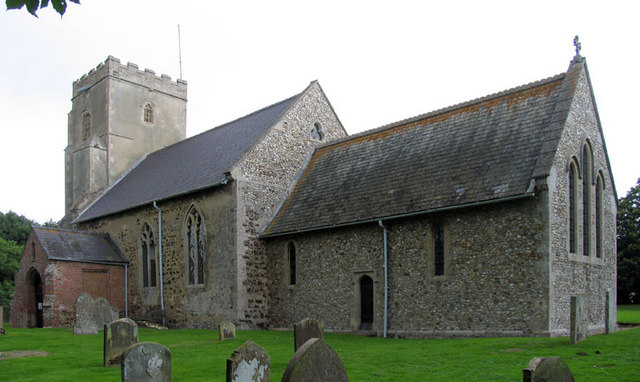
- St. Mary's Church

- Location within Norfolk
- Area: 12.08 km^{2} (4.66 sq mi)
- Population: 344 (2021)
  - Density: 28/km^{2} (73/sq mi)
- OS grid reference: TF650037
  - London: 132km
- Civil parish: Crimplesham
- District: King's Lynn and West Norfolk
- Shire county: Norfolk
- Region: East
- Country: England
- Sovereign state: United Kingdom
- Post town: KING'S LYNN
- Postcode district: PE33
- Dialling code: 01366
- Police: Norfolk
- Fire: Norfolk
- Ambulance: East of England
- UK Parliament: South West Norfolk

Crimplesham is a village and civil parish in the English county of Norfolk.

It is situated 2.5 miles (4.0 km) east of Downham Market, 12 miles (19 km) and 37 miles (60 km) west of the city of Norwich.

== History ==
Crimplesham's name is of Anglo-Saxon origin and derives from the Old English for Crymple's homestead or farmstead.

In the Domesday Book, Crimplesham is recorded as a settlement of 28 households in the hundred of Clackclose. In 1086, the village formed part of the estate of Reginald, son of Ivo. Additionally, the Domesday Book tells us that the landowner of Crimplesham in 1066 was Aelgyth, a woman.

During the Nineteenth Century, Crimplesham Manor was owned by the Bagges, with Crimplesham Hall being remodelled in the 1880s by Alfred Waterhouse at the expense of John Grant Morris. Crimplesham Hall stills stands today and is Grade II listed.

Furthermore, Crimplesham was a centre for Abolitionist Movement with records showing how Elizabeth Doyle of Crimplesham Hall inviting freed slaves to Crimplesham to meet the local schoolchildren.

Part of the parish fell within the grounds of RAF Downham Market during the Second World War, which was used by Pathfinder Squadrons.

== Geography ==
According to the 2021 census, Crimplesham has a population of 344 people which shows an increase from the 298 people listed in the 2011 census.

The A1122, between Outwell and Swaffham, runs through the Parish of Crimplesham.

== St. Mary's Church ==
Crimplesham's parish church is dedicated to Saint Mary and dates from the Twelfth Century. St. Mary's is located on Church Road and has been Grade II listed since 1959.

St. Mary's was further built throughout the Medieval era with a major restoration in the Victorian era. The church boasts a surviving Medieval rood screen.

== Notable residents ==
- Francis Dereham- (c.1509-1541) Tudor courtier, born in Crimplesham.

== Governance ==
Crimplesham is part of the electoral ward of Airfield for local elections and is part of the district of King's Lynn and West Norfolk.

The village's national constituency is South West Norfolk which has been represented by the Labour Party's Terry Jermy MP.

== War Memorial ==
Crimplesham War Memorial is a paper roll of honour and a further wooden plaque to the Wade Brothers listed below, both located in St. Mary's Churchyard. The memorial lists the following names for the First World War:

Rank	Name	Unit	Date of death	Burial/Commemoration
Pte.	Walter Bowman	51st Coy., Machine Gun Corps	14 Nov. 1916	Contay Cemetery
Pte.	Frederick A. Wade	7th Bn., Norfolk Regiment	2 Nov. 1915	Loos Memorial
Pte.	Frank Wade	7th Bn., Norfolk Regt.	13 Oct. 1915	Loos Memorial
Rfn.	Henry Sayers	16th Bn., King's Royal Rifle Corps	15 Apr. 1918	Ploegsteert Memorial

Crimplesham has no memorial for the Second World War, although the following men from the village died in the conflict:

Rank	Name	Unit	Date of death	Burial
PO	Anthony M. Dillon	No. 229 Squadron RAF	17 May 1940	Mons Cemetery
A1C	Francis C. Reeves	No. 907 (Balloon) Squadron RAF	12 Nov. 1940	Brookwood Cemetery
Pte.	Kenneth D. Bland	4th Bn., Royal Norfolk Regiment	17 Mar. 1942	Kranji War Cemetery
