= Listed buildings in King's Lynn and West Norfolk =

Protected structures in Norfolk, England

There are around 1,500 listed buildings in the King's Lynn and West Norfolk district, which are buildings of architectural or historic interest.

- Grade I buildings are of exceptional interest.
- Grade II* buildings are particularly important buildings of more than special interest.
- Grade II buildings are of special interest.

The lists follow Historic England’s geographical organisation, with entries grouped by county, local authority, and parish (civil and non-civil). The following lists are arranged by parish.

Parish	List of listed buildings	Grade I	Grade II*	Grade II	Total
Anmer	Listed buildings in Anmer, Norfolk				
Bagthorpe with Barmer	Listed buildings in Bagthorpe with Barmer				
Barton Bendish	Listed buildings in Barton Bendish				
Barwick	Listed buildings in Barwick, Norfolk				
Bawsey	Listed buildings in Bawsey				
Bircham	Listed buildings in Bircham				
Boughton	Listed buildings in Boughton, Norfolk				
Brancaster	Listed buildings in Brancaster				
Burnham Market	Listed buildings in Burnham Market				
Burnham Norton	Listed buildings in Burnham Norton				
Burnham Overy	Listed buildings in Burnham Overy				
Burnham Thorpe	Listed buildings in Burnham Thorpe				
Castle Acre	Listed buildings in Castle Acre				
Castle Rising	Listed buildings in Castle Rising				
Choseley	Listed buildings in Choseley				
Clenchwarton	Listed buildings in Clenchwarton				
Congham	Listed buildings in Congham				
Crimplesham	Listed buildings in Crimplesham				
Denver	Listed buildings in Denver, Norfolk				
Dersingham	Listed buildings in Dersingham				
Docking	Listed buildings in Docking, Norfolk				
Downham Market	Listed buildings in Downham Market				
Downham West	Listed buildings in Downham West				
East Rudham	Listed buildings in East Rudham				
East Walton	Listed buildings in East Walton				
East Winch	Listed buildings in East Winch				
Emneth	Listed buildings in Emneth				
Feltwell	Listed buildings in Feltwell				
Fincham	Listed buildings in Fincham, Norfolk				
Flitcham with Appleton	Listed buildings in Flitcham with Appleton				
Fordham	Listed buildings in Fordham, Norfolk				
Fring	Listed buildings in Fring, Norfolk				
Gayton	Listed buildings in Gayton, Norfolk				
Great Massingham	Listed buildings in Great Massingham				
Grimston	Listed buildings in Grimston, Norfolk				
Harpley	Listed buildings in Harpley, Norfolk				
Heacham	Listed buildings in Heacham				
Hilgay	Listed buildings in Hilgay				
Hillington	Listed buildings in Hillington, Norfolk				
Hockwold cum Wilton	Listed buildings in Hockwold cum Wilton				
Holme next the Sea	Listed buildings in Holme next the Sea				
Houghton	Listed buildings in Houghton, Norfolk				
Hunstanton	Listed buildings in Hunstanton				
Ingoldisthorpe	Listed buildings in Ingoldisthorpe				
King's Lynn	Listed buildings in King's Lynn	13	38	258	309
Leziate	Listed buildings in Leziate				
Little Massingham	Listed buildings in Little Massingham				
Marham	Listed buildings in Marham				
Marshland St. James	Listed buildings in Marshland St. James				
Methwold	Listed buildings in Methwold				
Middleton	Listed buildings in Middleton, Norfolk				
Nordelph	Listed buildings in Nordelph				
North Creake	Listed buildings in North Creake				
North Runcton	Listed buildings in North Runcton				
Northwold	Listed buildings in Northwold				
North Wootton	Listed buildings in North Wootton, Norfolk				
Old Hunstanton	Listed buildings in Old Hunstanton				
Outwell	Listed buildings in Outwell				
Pentney	Listed buildings in Pentney				
Ringstead	Listed buildings in Ringstead, Norfolk				
Roydon	Listed buildings in Roydon, King's Lynn and West Norfolk				
Runcton Holme	Listed buildings in Runcton Holme				
Ryston	Listed buildings in Ryston				
Sandringham	Listed buildings in Sandringham, Norfolk				
Sedgeford	Listed buildings in Sedgeford				
Shernborne	Listed buildings in Shernborne				
Shouldham	Listed buildings in Shouldham				
Shouldham Thorpe	Listed buildings in Shouldham Thorpe				
Snettisham	Listed buildings in Snettisham				
South Creake	Listed buildings in South Creake				
Southery	Listed buildings in Southery				
South Wootton	Listed buildings in South Wootton				
Stanhoe	Listed buildings in Stanhoe				
Stoke Ferry	Listed buildings in Stoke Ferry				
Stow Bardolph	Listed buildings in Stow Bardolph				
Stradsett	Listed buildings in Stradsett				
Syderstone	Listed buildings in Syderstone				
Terrington St. Clement	Listed buildings in Terrington St Clement				
Terrington St. John	Listed buildings in Terrington St. John				
Thornham	Listed buildings in Thornham, Norfolk				
Tilney All Saints	Listed buildings in Tilney All Saints				
Tilney St. Lawrence	Listed buildings in Tilney St. Lawrence				
Titchwell	Listed buildings in Titchwell				
Tottenhill	Listed buildings in Tottenhill				
Upwell	Listed buildings in Upwell				
Walpole	Listed buildings in Walpole, Norfolk				
Walpole Cross Keys	Listed buildings in Walpole Cross Keys				
Walpole Highway	Listed buildings in Walpole Highway				
Walsoken	Listed buildings in Walsoken				
Watlington	Listed buildings in Watlington, Norfolk				
Welney	Listed buildings in Welney				
Wereham	Listed buildings in Wereham				
West Acre	Listed buildings in West Acre, Norfolk				
West Dereham	Listed buildings in West Dereham				
West Rudham	Listed buildings in West Rudham				
West Walton	Listed buildings in West Walton				
West Winch	Listed buildings in West Winch				
Wiggenhall St. Germans	Listed buildings in Wiggenhall St. Germans				
Wiggenhall St. Mary Magdalen	Listed buildings in Wiggenhall St. Mary Magdalen				
Wimbotsham	Listed buildings in Wimbotsham				
Wormegay	Listed buildings in Wormegay				
Wretton	Listed buildings in Wretton				
Wordwell	Listed buildings in Wordwell				
Worlington	Listed buildings in Worlington, Suffolk				

== See also ==
- Grade I listed buildings in Norfolk
- Grade II* listed buildings in Norfolk

== Sources ==
- Wilson, Bill; Pevsner, Nikolaus (1999) [1962], Norfolk 2: North-West and South, The Buildings of England, New Haven and London: Yale University Press, ISBN 978-0-300-09657-6
