= 2027 King's Lynn and West Norfolk Borough Council election =

2027 English local government election

- 6 May 2027

All 55 seats to King's Lynn & West Norfolk Borough Council 28 seats needed for a majority
Leader	(Note: Alistair Beales was leader of the Independent Partnership group. Charles Joyce was the leader of the West Norfolk Independent group.)	Richard Blunt	Julian Kirk
Party	Independent	Conservative	Reform
Leader's seat	(Note: Alistair Beales was a sitting councillor for Massingham with Castle Acre ward. Charles Joyce was a sitting councillor for South & West Lynn ward.)	Walsoken, West Walton & Walpole	Walsoken, West Walton & Walpole
Last election	18 seats, 29.3%	21 seats, 37.0%	Did not stand
Current seats	23 (Note: Of the 23 Independent councillors before the election, 17 sat in the Independent Partnership group, 3 sat in the West Norfolk Independent group, 2 sat in The Progressive group, and 1 was non-aligned.)	17	7
Leader	Joshua Osborne	Alistair Beales (Note: Leader of the Independent Partnership group.)	Alistair Beales
Party	Labour	Liberal Democrats	Your Party
Leader's seat	Downham Old Town	Massingham with Castle Acre	Massingham with Castle Acre
Last election	11 seats, 18.3%	3 seats, 6.0%	Did not exist
Current seats	5	2 (Note: The 2 Liberal Democrat councillors sat in the Independent Partnership group.)	1
Party	Green
Last election	2 seats, 5.1%
Current seats	0
Incumbent Leader
Alistair Beales
Independent
No overall control (Note: Independent–Liberal Democrats–Your Party minority coalition.)

The 2027 King's Lynn and West Norfolk Borough Council election will be held on 6 May 2027 to elect members of King's Lynn and West Norfolk Borough Council in Norfolk, England. This will be on the same day as other local elections held across the United Kingdom.

== Background ==
=== Local government reorganisation ===
Due to proposed structural changes to local government in England, the 2023 election would have been the final election to the council before it was abolished and replaced by West Norfolk Council, a unitary authority. However, on 7 September 2026, the government announced it was withdrawing plans for the planned restructuring pending review. Following this announcement, local elections due to be held in 2027 under the existing local electoral calendar would proceed.

== Summary ==
=== Election result ===
2027 King's Lynn and West Norfolk Borough Council election
Party	Candidates	Seats	Gains	Losses	Net gain/loss	Seats %	Votes %	Votes	+/−
Independent		23							
Conservative		17							
Reform		7							
Labour		5							
Liberal Democrats		2							
Your Party		1							
Green		0							
