= 1979 West Norfolk District Council election =

1979 English local election

- 3 May 1979

All 60 seats to West Norfolk District Council 31 seats needed for a majority
- Registered: 89,012
- Turnout: ~48.5% (▲8.2%)

	First party	Second party
Party	Conservative	Labour
Seats won	42	15
Seat change	▲5	▲2
Popular vote	48,076	42,003
Percentage	49.5%	43.2%
Swing	▲2.2%	▲4.7%
	Third party	Fourth party
Party	Independent	Ind. Conservative
Seats won	3	0
Seat change	▼4	▼3
Popular vote	4,976	356
Percentage	5.1%	0.4%
Swing	▼5.2%	▼2.6%
Control before election
Conservative
Control after election
Conservative

The 1979 West Norfolk District Council election took place on 3 May 1979 to elect members of West Norfolk District Council in Norfolk, England. This was on the same day as the 1979 general election and other local elections.

== Summary ==
=== Election result ===
1979 West Norfolk District Council election
Party	Candidates	Seats	Gains	Losses	Net gain/loss	Seats %	Votes %	Votes	+/−
Conservative	59	42	11	4	▲5	70.0	49.5	48,076	+2.2
Labour	28	15	3	1	▲2	25.0	43.2	42,003	+4.7
Independent	8	3	2	8	▼4	5.0	5.1	4,976	–5.2
Liberal	3	0	0	0	Steady	0.0	1.1	1,042	+0.3
Independent Labour	1	0	0	0	Steady	0.0	0.8	741	N/A
Ind. Conservative	1	0	0	3	▼3	0.0	0.4	356	–2.6

22 Conservatives and 1 Independent were elected unopposed.

== Ward results ==
Incumbent councillors standing for re-election are marked with an asterisk (*). Changes in seats do not take into account by-elections or defections.

=== Airfield ===
Airfield (2 seats)
Party	Candidate	Votes	%	±%
Conservative	J. Bagge*	Unopposed		
Conservative	H. Harris*	Unopposed		
Registered electors		2,572		
Conservative gain from Independent				
Conservative hold				

=== Burnham ===
Burnham
Party	Candidate	Votes	%	±%
Conservative	E. Coke*	Unopposed		
Registered electors		1,366		
Conservative gain from Independent				

=== Clenchwarton ===
Clenchwarton
Party	Candidate	Votes	%	±%
Conservative	R. Kerkham*	521	43.9	
Independent	J. Jones	351	29.6	
Labour	F. Mallett	315	26.5	
Majority		170	14.3	
Turnout		1,187	80.7	
Registered electors		1,471		
Conservative hold		Swing		

=== Creake ===
Creake
Party	Candidate	Votes	%	±%
Conservative	J. Negus	Unopposed		
Registered electors		1,347		
Conservative gain from Independent				

=== Denton ===
Denton (3 seats)
Party	Candidate	Votes	%	±%
Conservative	A. Spencer	1,608	53.2	
Conservative	M. Jones*	1,545	51.1	
Conservative	G. Peat	1,527	50.5	
Labour	J. Waterfall	1,417	46.8	
Turnout		~3,025	74.5	
Registered electors		4,060		
Conservative hold				
Conservative hold				
Conservative hold				

=== Dersingham ===
Dersingham (2 seats)
Party	Candidate	Votes	%	±%
Conservative	W. Greenwood*	Unopposed		
Conservative	I. Stockwell*	Unopposed		
Registered electors		3,037		
Conservative hold				
Conservative hold				

=== Docking ===
Docking
Party	Candidate	Votes	%	±%
Labour	M. Howard*	668	60.3	
Conservative	E. Coker	439	39.7	
Majority		229	20.6	
Turnout		1,107	78.6	
Registered electors		1,409		
Labour hold		Swing		

=== Emneth ===
Emneth
Party	Candidate	Votes	%	±%
Conservative	N. Terrington*	Unopposed		
Registered electors		1,493		
Conservative gain from Independent				

=== Gayton ===
Gayton
Party	Candidate	Votes	%	±%
Conservative	I. Major*	767	66.0	
Labour	M. Carden*	396	34.0	
Majority		371	32.0	
Turnout		1,163	81.8	
Registered electors		1,422		
Conservative gain from Ind. Conservative		Swing		

=== Lynn South West ===
Lynn South West (2 seats)
Party	Candidate	Votes	%	±%
Labour	D. Benefer*	1,007	44.1	
Labour	W. Baker*	969	42.4	
Independent Labour	H. Temby	741	32.4	
Conservative	D. Chesney	538	23.5	
Conservative	P. Brunker	505	22.1	
Turnout		~2,285	79.0	
Registered electors		2,892		
Labour hold				
Labour hold				

=== Mershe Lande ===
Mershe Lande
Party	Candidate	Votes	%	±%
Conservative	H. Goose*	839	71.3	
Independent	W. Morton	338	28.7	
Majority		501	42.6	
Turnout		1,177	74.3	
Registered electors		1,584		
Conservative gain from Ind. Conservative		Swing		

=== Middleton ===
Middleton
Party	Candidate	Votes	%	±%
Conservative	J. Lemon*	Unopposed		
Registered electors		1,423		
Conservative gain from Independent				

=== No. 1 (Kings Lynn: Gaywood) ===
No. 1 (Kings Lynn: Gaywood) (6 seats)
Party	Candidate	Votes	%	±%
Conservative	T. Swann	3,658	39.6	
Conservative	F. Barton*	3,652	39.5	
Conservative	D. Garwood*	3,563	38.6	
Labour	G. Shelton	3,488	37.7	
Labour	P. Wilkinson	3,471	37.6	
Labour	A. Burch	3,431	37.1	
Labour	K. West*	3,303	35.7	
Labour	G. Falcini	3,275	35.4	
Labour	T. Coy	3,251	35.2	
Conservative	A. Daubney	3,216	34.8	
Conservative	R. Sharp*	3,196	34.6	
Conservative	G. Ison*	3,097	33.5	
Independent	J. Loveless	2,080	22.5	
Turnout		~9,226	83.6	
Registered electors		11,032		
Conservative hold				
Conservative hold				
Conservative hold				
Labour gain from Conservative				
Labour gain from Conservative				
Labour gain from Conservative				

=== No. 2 (Kings Lynn: North) ===
No. 2 (Kings Lynn: North) (4 seats)
Party	Candidate	Votes	%	±%
Labour	F. Juniper	2,198	74.5	
Labour	A. Panks	2,158	73.2	
Labour	E. Panks*	2,020	68.6	
Labour	M. Pantling	1,926	65.4	
Conservative	K. Hudd	751	25.5	
Conservative	M. Kelly*	741	25.1	
Conservative	A. Stopforth	689	23.4	
Conservative	E. Morrison*	671	22.8	
Turnout		~2,950	61.2	
Registered electors		4,820		
Labour hold				
Labour hold				
Labour hold				
Labour hold				

=== No. 5 (Kings Lynn: Chase & Central) ===
No. 5 (Kings Lynn: Chase & Central) (3 seats)
Party	Candidate	Votes	%	±%
Conservative	B. Barton*	1,268	58.1	
Conservative	F. Cork*	1,166	53.4	
Conservative	R. Fraulo	1,095	50.1	
Labour	P. Richards	915	41.9	
Labour	J. Dunton*	798	36.6	
Labour	L. Coy*	734	33.6	
Turnout		~2,184	65.4	
Registered electors		3,337		
Conservative hold				
Conservative hold				
Conservative hold				

=== No. 6 (Downham Market) ===
No. 6 (Downham Market) (2 seats)
Party	Candidate	Votes	%	±%
Conservative	L. Brown*	1,844	54.0	
Conservative	J. Bostock*	1,558	45.6	
Labour	G. Howells	961	28.1	
Liberal	A. Robson	608	17.8	
Turnout		~3,414	93.2	
Registered electors		3,663		
Conservative hold				
Conservative hold				

=== No. 7 (Hunstanton) ===
No. 7 (Hunstanton) (2 seats)
Party	Candidate	Votes	%	±%
Conservative	C. Legge*	Unopposed		
Conservative	L. Brown*	Unopposed		
Registered electors		3,407		
Conservative gain from Independent				
Conservative hold				

=== No. 9 (Heacham) ===
No. 9 (Heacham) (2 seats)
Party	Candidate	Votes	%	±%
Conservative	E. Gidney*	1,521	57.6	
Conservative	V. Stapley	1,255	47.5	
Labour	J. Wells*	1,121	42.4	
Turnout		~2,644	78.4	
Registered electors		3,372		
Conservative hold				
Conservative gain from Labour				

=== No. 17 (Stoke Ferry) ===
No. 17 (Stoke Ferry)
Party	Candidate	Votes	%	±%
Conservative	F. Cowieson*	Unopposed		
Registered electors		1,393		
Conservative hold				

=== No. 18 (Denver) ===
No. 18 (Denver)
Party	Candidate	Votes	%	±%
Independent	J. Sharpe	833	70.8	
Conservative	A. Johnson	344	29.2	
Majority		489	41.6	
Turnout		1,177	81.3	
Registered electors		1,447		
Independent gain from Conservative		Swing		

=== No. 19 (Wimbotsham) ===
No. 19 (Wimbotsham)
Party	Candidate	Votes	%	±%
Conservative	H. Blakey	384	38.6	
Independent	S. Boughen	362	36.4	
Liberal	R. Frost	248	24.9	
Majority		22	2.2	
Turnout		994	78.5	
Registered electors		1,267		
Conservative hold		Swing		

=== No. 20 (Welney) ===
No. 20 (Welney)
Party	Candidate	Votes	%	±%
Conservative	H. Rose*	Unopposed		
Registered electors		1,217		
Conservative hold				

=== No. 25 (South Wootton) ===
No. 25 (South Wootton)
Party	Candidate	Votes	%	±%
Conservative	L. Dutton*	Unopposed		
Registered electors		2,181		
Conservative hold				

=== No. 26 (North Wootton) ===
No. 26 (North Wootton)
Party	Candidate	Votes	%	±%
Conservative	R. Spencer*	Unopposed		
Registered electors		1,485		
Conservative hold				

=== No. 27 (Massingham) ===
No. 27 (Massingham)
Party	Candidate	Votes	%	±%
Labour	J. Tilbury*	717	64.1	
Conservative	A. Everett	402	35.9	
Majority		315	28.2	
Turnout		1,119	81.2	
Registered electors		1,378		
Labour hold		Swing		

=== No. 28 (Grimston) ===
No. 28 (Grimston)
Party	Candidate	Votes	%	±%
Conservative	J. Reader*	Unopposed		
Registered electors		1,661		
Conservative hold				

=== No. 40 (Outwell & Upwell) ===
No. 40 (Outwell & Upwell) (2 seats)
Party	Candidate	Votes	%	±%
Conservative	E. Feary*	Unopposed		
Conservative	J. Shepherd*	Unopposed		
Registered electors		2,247		
Conservative hold				
Conservative hold				

=== North Coast ===
North Coast
Party	Candidate	Votes	%	±%
Conservative	H. Middleton*	Unopposed		
Registered electors		1,775		
Conservative hold				

=== Priory ===
Priory
Party	Candidate	Votes	%	±%
Labour	G. Sandle*	485	52.2	
Conservative	R. Peck	444	47.8	
Majority		41	4.4	
Turnout		929	80.8	
Registered electors		1,150		
Labour hold		Swing		

=== Rudham ===
Rudham
Party	Candidate	Votes	%	±%
Labour	B. Seaman*	498	59.4	
Conservative	J. Mickleburgh*	341	40.6	
Majority		157	18.8	
Turnout		839	80.6	
Registered electors		1,041		
Labour hold		Swing		

=== Snettisham ===
Snettisham
Party	Candidate	Votes	%	±%
Conservative	F. Barwick*	Unopposed		
Registered electors		1,750		
Conservative gain from Independent				

=== Spellowfields ===
Spellowfields (2 seats)
Party	Candidate	Votes	%	±%
Conservative	J. Howling*	1,328	48.0	
Conservative	J. Wright	1,196	43.2	
Labour	W. Cowen	827	29.9	
Ind. Conservative	W. Gent	356	12.9	
Independent	S. Cruickshank	253	9.1	
Turnout		~2,765	93.2	
Registered electors		2,967		
Conservative hold				
Conservative hold				

=== St. Lawrence ===
St. Lawrence
Party	Candidate	Votes	%	±%
Conservative	W. Garner	733	61.3	
Labour	J. Castle	463	38.7	
Majority		270	22.6	
Turnout		1,196	78.3	
Registered electors		1,527		
Conservative gain from Independent		Swing		

=== St. Margarets ===
St. Margarets
Party	Candidate	Votes	%	±%
Labour	A. West	529	44.1	
Conservative	H. Bolt*	484	40.4	
Liberal	B. Goldstone	186	15.5	
Majority		45	3.7	
Turnout		1,199	79.0	
Registered electors		1,517		
Labour hold		Swing		

=== Ten Mile ===
Ten Mile
Party	Candidate	Votes	%	±%
Labour	J. Simper*	662	50.0	
Conservative	R. Legge	661	50.0	
Majority		1	0.0	
Turnout		1,323	74.7	
Registered electors		1,771		
Labour hold		Swing		

=== The Walpoles ===
The Walpoles
Party	Candidate	Votes	%	±%
Independent	E. Kemp*	759	58.9	
Conservative	K. Cousins*	529	41.1	
Majority		230	17.8	
Turnout		1,288	77.5	
Registered electors		1,663		
Independent gain from Ind. Conservative		Swing		

=== Watlington ===
Watlington
Party	Candidate	Votes	%	±%
Conservative	P. Haynes*	Unopposed		
Registered electors		1,540		
Conservative hold				

=== West Walton ===
West Walton
Party	Candidate	Votes	%	±%
Independent	F. Jude*	Unopposed		
Registered electors		1,034		
Independent hold				

=== West Winch ===
West Winch
Party	Candidate	Votes	%	±%
Conservative	R. Nichols*	Unopposed		
Registered electors		1,865		
Conservative hold				

=== Wiggenhall ===
Wiggenhall
Party	Candidate	Votes	%	±%
Conservative	J. Turrell*	Unopposed		
Registered electors		1,429		
Conservative hold				
