= Listed buildings in King's Lynn =

Non-Civil Parish in Norfolk, England

King's Lynn is a town and unparished area in the King's Lynn and West Norfolk district of Norfolk, England. It contains 309 listed buildings that are recorded in the National Heritage List for England. Of these 13 are grade I, 38 are grade II* and 258 are grade II.

This list is based on the information retrieved online from Historic England.

== Key ==
Grade	Criteria
I	Buildings that are of exceptional interest
II*	Particularly important buildings of more than special interest
II	Buildings that are of special interest

== Listing ==
Name	Grade	Location	Type	Completed (Note: The date given is the date used by Historic England as significant for the initial building or that of an important part in the structure's description.)	Date designated	Grid ref. (Note: The grid reference is based on the British national grid reference system, sometimes known as OSGB36, used by the Ordnance Survey.) Geo-coordinates	Notes	Entry number (Note: The "List Entry Number" is a unique number assigned to each listed building and scheduled monument by Historic England.)	Image	Wikidata
1, Aickman's Yard	II	1, Aickman's Yard			7 June 1972	TF6160220160; 52°45′18″N 0°23′35″E		1298202	Upload Photo	Q26585720
3,4, Aickman's Yard	II	3, 4, Aickman's Yard			7 June 1972	TF6158620148; 52°45′17″N 0°23′34″E		1195333	Upload Photo	Q26489922
Wall 12 Metres East of River Bank	II	Aickman's Yard			26 July 1993	TF6153420172; 52°45′18″N 0°23′32″E		1298203	Upload Photo	Q26585721
25, All Saints Street	II	25, All Saints Street			7 June 1972	TF6193419537; 52°44′57″N 0°23′52″E		1195334	Upload Photo	Q26489923
26, All Saints Street	II	26, All Saints Street			7 June 1972	TF6194119535; 52°44′57″N 0°23′52″E		1298164	Upload Photo	Q26585686
27,28, All Saints Street	II	27, 28, All Saints Street			7 June 1972	TF6194719534; 52°44′57″N 0°23′53″E		1195335	Upload Photo	Q26489924
29, All Saints Street	II	29, All Saints Street			7 June 1972	TF6195419532; 52°44′57″N 0°23′53″E		1195336	Upload Photo	Q26489925
30, All Saints Street	II	30, All Saints Street			7 June 1972	TF6195819530; 52°44′57″N 0°23′53″E		1298165	Upload Photo	Q26585687
31-35, All Saints Street	II	31-35, All Saints Street			7 June 1972	TF6197219523; 52°44′57″N 0°23′54″E		1195337	Upload Photo	Q26489926
36, All Saints Street	II	36, All Saints Street			7 June 1972	TF6198519515; 52°44′56″N 0°23′55″E		1291483	Upload Photo	Q26579595
Ruins of St James Chapel, Ancillary Buildings	II	Ancillary Buildings, County Court Road			26 July 1993	TF6215519779; 52°45′05″N 0°24′04″E		1195306	Upload Photo	Q26489897
Austin House	II	15, Austin Street			1 December 1951	TF6189220404; 52°45′25″N 0°23′51″E		1219444	Upload Photo	Q26513988
15a, Austin Street	II	15a, Austin Street			7 June 1972	TF6190620398; 52°45′25″N 0°23′52″E		1298166	Upload Photo	Q26585688
North Gateway to Friary Precinct	II	Austin Street			1 December 1951	TF6184820382; 52°45′25″N 0°23′49″E		1291449	Upload Photo	Q26579564
St John's Terrace and Attached Area Railings	II	3-13, Blackfriars Road			7 June 1972	TF6221120007; 52°45′12″N 0°24′07″E		1195338	Upload Photo	Q26489927
Belgrave Hotel	II	14, Blackfriars Road			7 June 1972	TF6224720017; 52°45′12″N 0°24′09″E		1291453	Upload Photo	Q26579568
Kings Lynn Railway Station	II	Blackfriars Road	dead-end railway station		24 August 2001	TF6228420064; 52°45′14″N 0°24′11″E		1389399	Kings Lynn Railway Station More images	Q285604
The Church of St John the Evangelist	II	Blackfriars Road	church building		19 October 2004	TF6226019972; 52°45′11″N 0°24′10″E		1391201	The Church of St John the Evangelist More images	Q26670570
Stepney Chapel	II	Blackfriars Street			7 June 1972	TF6208720005; 52°45′12″N 0°24′01″E		1298167	Upload Photo	Q26585689
Greenland Fishery House	II*	28, Bridge Street	house		1 December 1951	TF6188219623; 52°45′00″N 0°23′49″E		1219470	Greenland Fishery House More images	Q17555276
30, Bridge Street	II	30, Bridge Street			1 December 1951	TF6188719609; 52°44′59″N 0°23′50″E		1195339	Upload Photo	Q26489928
31, Bridge Street	II	31, Bridge Street			1 December 1951	TF6188819604; 52°44′59″N 0°23′50″E		1219491	Upload Photo	Q26514032
32, Bridge Street	II	32, Bridge Street			1 December 1951	TF6188719599; 52°44′59″N 0°23′49″E		1195340	Upload Photo	Q26489929
33,34, Bridge Street	II	33, 34, Bridge Street			1 December 1951	TF6188719591; 52°44′59″N 0°23′49″E		1219507	Upload Photo	Q26514048
35, Bridge Street	II	35, Bridge Street			1 December 1951	TF6188519583; 52°44′59″N 0°23′49″E		1298168	Upload Photo	Q26585690
36, Bridge Street	II	36, Bridge Street			1 December 1951	TF6188419578; 52°44′58″N 0°23′49″E		1219509	Upload Photo	Q26514050
37, Bridge Street	II	37, Bridge Street			1 December 1951	TF6188319573; 52°44′58″N 0°23′49″E		1291443	Upload Photo	Q26579558
Religious Society of Friends Meeting House	II	38, Bridge Street			7 June 1972	TF6188119560; 52°44′58″N 0°23′49″E		1195341	Upload Photo	Q26489930
North Guannock Gate and Portion of Town Wall	II*	Broad Walk	gate		1 December 1951	TF6246019731; 52°45′03″N 0°24′20″E		1219520	Upload Photo	Q17555282
Cannon Bollard Immediately South East of the Exorcists House	II	Immediately South East Of No 7 (the Exorcists House), Chapel Lane, King's Lynn, PE30 1QJ			15 April 1977	TF6186320422; 52°45′26″N 0°23′50″E		1219532	Upload Photo	Q26514072
The Exorcists House	II	7, Chapel Lane, King's Lynn, PE30 1QJ	house		1 December 1951	TF6185820425; 52°45′26″N 0°23′49″E		1298169	The Exorcists House More images	Q26585691
25, Chapel Street	II	25, Chapel Street			7 June 1972	TF6183220274; 52°45′21″N 0°23′48″E		1195342	Upload Photo	Q26489931
Westgate House	II	42, Chapel Street			1 December 1951	TF6183920318; 52°45′22″N 0°23′48″E		1195343	Upload Photo	Q26489932
5,6, Church Lane	II	5, 6, Church Lane			7 June 1972	TF6201619523; 52°44′57″N 0°23′56″E		1291381	Upload Photo	Q26579501
Church of All Saints	II*	Church Lane	church building		1 December 1951	TF6204019570; 52°44′58″N 0°23′58″E		1195345	Church of All Saints More images	Q17555079
Gates from Church Lane Into Churchyard of All Saints	II	Church Lane			7 June 1972	TF6202719550; 52°44′57″N 0°23′57″E		1219651	Upload Photo	Q26514182
17,18, Church Street	II*	17, 18, Church Street			7 June 1972	TF6181819761; 52°45′04″N 0°23′46″E		1219670	Upload Photo	Q17555292
Friarscot	II	Church Street			1 December 1951	TF6182119706; 52°45′03″N 0°23′46″E		1195346	Upload Photo	Q26489934
Ruins of St James' Chapel	II	County Court Road			1 December 1951	TF6214319799; 52°45′05″N 0°24′03″E		1298188	Upload Photo	Q26585707
The Former Courthouse Including Railings to Facade	II	County Court Road, King's Lynn, PE30 5EJ			7 June 1972	TF6211919766; 52°45′04″N 0°24′02″E		1210671	Upload Photo	Q26505716
Old Battery House	II	Crossbank Road			3 August 2009	TF6131620993; 52°45′45″N 0°23′22″E		1393405	Upload Photo	Q26672570
Ferry House and Ferryside	II	2, Ferry Square, West Lynn			1 December 1951	TF6119420330; 52°45′24″N 0°23′14″E		1195307	Upload Photo	Q26489898
8, Ferry Square	II	8, Ferry Square, West Lynn			7 June 1972	TF6121520297; 52°45′22″N 0°23′15″E		1298189	Upload Photo	Q26585708
Crown and Mitre Public House	II	Ferry Street, King's Lynn, PE30 1LJ			1 December 1951	TF6152820277; 52°45′21″N 0°23′32″E		1195308	Crown and Mitre Public House More images	Q26489899
33, Friars Street	II	33, Friars Street			7 June 1972	TF6205419392; 52°44′52″N 0°23′58″E		1298190	Upload Photo	Q26585709
47,49, Friars Street	II	47, 49, Friars Street			26 July 1993	TF6207219351; 52°44′51″N 0°23′59″E		1195309	Upload Photo	Q26489900
Gate, Gate Piers and Railings to St Margaret's Churchyard	II	Gate Piers And Railings To St Margaret's Churchyard, St Margaret's Place			7 June 1972	TF6172619796; 52°45′06″N 0°23′41″E		1195392	Upload Photo	Q26489975
Swan Inn	II	4, Gayton Road, Gaywood			7 June 1972	TF6347820466; 52°45′25″N 0°25′16″E		1298191	Upload Photo	Q26585710
22 and 24, Gayton Road	II	22 and 24, Gayton Road			7 June 1972	TF6358920465; 52°45′25″N 0°25′22″E		1195310	Upload Photo	Q26489901
The Old Rectory	II	26, Gayton Road, Gaywood			7 June 1972	TF6368120436; 52°45′24″N 0°25′27″E		1219737	Upload Photo	Q26514262
Field House	II	47, Gayton Road, Gaywood			7 June 1972	TF6374220477; 52°45′26″N 0°25′30″E		1219758	Upload Photo	Q26514281
Church of St Faith	II*	Gayton Road, Gaywood	church building		1 December 1951	TF6361520396; 52°45′23″N 0°25′23″E		1195311	Church of St Faith More images	Q17555032
Almshouses (gaywood Hospital)	II	Gaywood Road, PE30 2PY			1 December 1951	TF6291820430; 52°45′25″N 0°24′46″E		1219806	Upload Photo	Q26514323
Bridge at East Gate	II	Gaywood Road			1 December 1951	TF6235420368; 52°45′24″N 0°24′16″E		1291272	Upload Photo	Q17646444
Gates and Gate Piers to King Edward Vii High School	II	Gaywood Road			7 June 1972	TF6297620474; 52°45′26″N 0°24′49″E		1219834	Upload Photo	Q26514350
King Edward Vii High School	II*	Gaywood Road			7 June 1972	TF6297420417; 52°45′24″N 0°24′49″E		1195312	Upload Photo	Q17555049
Porter's Lodge at King Edward Vii High School	II	Gaywood Road			7 June 1972	TF6293120463; 52°45′26″N 0°24′47″E		1298193	Upload Photo	Q26585712
Statue of King Edward Vii at King Edward Vii High School	II	Gaywood Road			7 June 1972	TF6300220427; 52°45′25″N 0°24′50″E		1219865	Upload Photo	Q26514376
Wall and Gates to Almshouse	II	Gaywood Road			7 June 1972	TF6290720461; 52°45′26″N 0°24′45″E		1298192	Upload Photo	Q26585711
Elmer Lodge	II	81, Goodwins Road			7 June 1972	TF6262919472; 52°44′54″N 0°24′29″E		1195313	Upload Photo	Q26489902
1-11, Guanock Place	II	1-11, Guanock Place			7 June 1972	TF6225219233; 52°44′47″N 0°24′08″E		1291266	Upload Photo	Q26579397
Fife Fishing Disaster Monument at Hardwick Cemetery	II	Hardwick Road			3 January 2006	TF6248218976; 52°44′38″N 0°24′20″E		1391461	Upload Photo	Q26670824
1,2, High Street	II	1, 2, High Street			7 June 1972	TF6177119845; 52°45′07″N 0°23′44″E		1195314	Upload Photo	Q26489903
23, High Street	II	23, High Street			7 June 1972	TF6178919999; 52°45′12″N 0°23′45″E		1219899	Upload Photo	Q26514405
26, High Street	II	26, High Street			7 June 1972	TF6178320025; 52°45′13″N 0°23′45″E		1298194	Upload Photo	Q26585713
37, High Street	II	37, High Street			7 June 1972	TF6176920067; 52°45′14″N 0°23′44″E		1291213	Upload Photo	Q26579349
38,39, High Street	II	38, 39, High Street			7 June 1972	TF6176820075; 52°45′15″N 0°23′44″E		1219979	Upload Photo	Q26514481
48-51, High Street	II	48-51, High Street			1 December 1951	TF6175220145; 52°45′17″N 0°23′43″E		1195315	Upload Photo	Q26489904
52, High Street	II	52, High Street			7 June 1972	TF6175020161; 52°45′17″N 0°23′43″E		1291207	Upload Photo	Q26579345
53,53a, High Street	II	53, 53a, High Street			7 June 1972	TF6174920167; 52°45′18″N 0°23′43″E		1298195	Upload Photo	Q26585714
54, High Street	II	54, High Street			7 June 1972	TF6175020175; 52°45′18″N 0°23′43″E		1220008	Upload Photo	Q26514508
56, High Street	II	56, High Street			7 June 1972	TF6174520203; 52°45′19″N 0°23′43″E		1195316	Upload Photo	Q26489905
61,62, High Street	II	61, 62, High Street			7 June 1972	TF6174120236; 52°45′20″N 0°23′43″E		1298196	Upload Photo	Q26585715
81,81a,81b, High Street	II*	81, 81a, 81b, High Street			1 December 1951	TF6172920159; 52°45′17″N 0°23′42″E		1195317	Upload Photo	Q17555055
82, High Street	II	82, High Street			7 June 1972	TF6173120145; 52°45′17″N 0°23′42″E		1220064	Upload Photo	Q26514562
83,84, High Street	II	83, 84, High Street			7 June 1972	TF6173320136; 52°45′17″N 0°23′42″E		1291160	Upload Photo	Q26579299
102,103b, High Street	II	102, 103b, High Street			7 June 1972	TF6176519990; 52°45′12″N 0°23′44″E		1195318	Upload Photo	Q26489906
56a, High Street	II	56a, High Street			1 December 1951	TF6175320201; 52°45′19″N 0°23′43″E		1220012	Upload Photo	Q26514512
The Red Barn, Immediately South West of the Guildhall in Courtyard	II	Immediately South West Of The Guildhall In Courtyard, King Street			26 July 1993	TF6159520220; 52°45′20″N 0°23′35″E		1195294	Upload Photo	Q26489885
Length of Town Wall	II*	Kettlewell Lane			1 December 1951	TF6231720460; 52°45′27″N 0°24′14″E		1298197	Upload Photo	Q17555443
1, King Street	II	1, King Street			7 June 1972	TF6162320059; 52°45′14″N 0°23′36″E		1291147	Upload Photo	Q26579287
3, King Street	II	3, King Street			1 December 1951	TF6162320069; 52°45′15″N 0°23′36″E		1195319	Upload Photo	Q26489907
4, King Street	II	4, King Street			1 December 1951	TF6164720069; 52°45′15″N 0°23′38″E		1298198	Upload Photo	Q26585716
5, King Street	II*	5, King Street			1 December 1951	TF6162120084; 52°45′15″N 0°23′36″E		1220161	Upload Photo	Q17555298
6, King Street	II	6, King Street			1 December 1951	TF6164720078; 52°45′15″N 0°23′38″E		1195320	Upload Photo	Q26489908
Medieval Merchant's House	II*	7, 9, King Street			1 December 1951	TF6162020096; 52°45′16″N 0°23′36″E		1291131	Upload Photo	Q17555402
Chancery House	II	8, King Street			1 December 1951	TF6164620084; 52°45′15″N 0°23′38″E		1195322	Upload Photo	Q26489911
10, King Street	II	10, King Street			1 December 1951	TF6164620093; 52°45′15″N 0°23′38″E		1220245	Upload Photo	Q26514730
11, King Street	II	11, King Street			1 December 1951	TF6162020111; 52°45′16″N 0°23′36″E		1195324	Upload Photo	Q26489913
14,14a, King Street	II	14, 14a, King Street			7 June 1972	TF6164620122; 52°45′16″N 0°23′38″E		1195325	Upload Photo	Q26489914
15, King Street	II*	15, King Street			1 December 1951	TF6162020141; 52°45′17″N 0°23′36″E		1195285	Upload Photo	Q17555027
16,18, King Street	II	16, 18, King Street			1 December 1951	TF6164520132; 52°45′17″N 0°23′38″E		1195286	Upload Photo	Q26489877
Wood House	II	17, King Street			1 December 1951	TF6162120148; 52°45′17″N 0°23′36″E		1195287	Upload Photo	Q26489878
19, King Street	II	19, King Street			1 December 1951	TF6162220155; 52°45′17″N 0°23′36″E		1298220	Upload Photo	Q26585736
20, King Street	II	20, King Street			1 December 1951	TF6164620140; 52°45′17″N 0°23′38″E		1195288	Upload Photo	Q26489879
Old School Court	II	21, King Street			1 December 1951	TF6162120176; 52°45′18″N 0°23′36″E		1298221	Upload Photo	Q26585737
23,25, King Street	II	23, 25, King Street			1 December 1951	TF6162920196; 52°45′19″N 0°23′37″E		1195290	Upload Photo	Q26489881
24,26, King Street	II	24, 26, King Street			1 December 1951	TF6165020161; 52°45′18″N 0°23′38″E		1220396	Upload Photo	Q26514871
Museum of Social History	II*	27, King Street			1 December 1951	TF6163020208; 52°45′19″N 0°23′37″E		1298222	Upload Photo	Q17555453
28,30,32, King Street	I	28, 30, 32, King Street			1 December 1951	TF6165220175; 52°45′18″N 0°23′38″E		1195291	Upload Photo	Q17536417
Shakespeare House	II	29, King Street			1 December 1951	TF6163620232; 52°45′20″N 0°23′37″E		1220443	Upload Photo	Q26514918
34, King Street	II	34, King Street			7 June 1972	TF6165220188; 52°45′18″N 0°23′38″E		1220455	Upload Photo	Q26514928
36, King Street	II	36, King Street			7 June 1972	TF6165220195; 52°45′19″N 0°23′38″E		1195292	Upload Photo	Q26489883
40,42, King Street	II	40, 42, King Street			1 December 1951	TF6165320206; 52°45′19″N 0°23′38″E		1220457	Upload Photo	Q26514929
46, King Street	II	46, King Street			24 May 1971	TF6165820223; 52°45′20″N 0°23′38″E		1298184	Upload Photo	Q26585703
48, King Street	II	48, King Street			1 December 1951	TF6165820233; 52°45′20″N 0°23′38″E		1220472	Upload Photo	Q26514944
13a, King Street	II	13a, King Street			1 December 1951	TF6160820128; 52°45′17″N 0°23′36″E		1291070	Upload Photo	Q26579218
15a, King Street	II*	15a, King Street			1 December 1951	TF6162020128; 52°45′17″N 0°23′36″E		1298219	Upload Photo	Q17555449
3a, King Street	II	3a, King Street			1 December 1951	TF6162320076; 52°45′15″N 0°23′36″E		1220151	Upload Photo	Q26514645
Cannon Bollard at Junction of Ferry Lane	II	King Street			15 April 1977	TF6163420188; 52°45′18″N 0°23′37″E		1195293	Upload Photo	Q26489884
Cannon Bollard at South East Corner of Carriage Arch Under No 10	II	King Street			15 April 1977	TF6164720098; 52°45′16″N 0°23′38″E		1195323	Upload Photo	Q26489912
Cannon Bollard at South West Corner of Carriage Arch Under No 10	II	King Street			15 April 1977	TF6164120097; 52°45′16″N 0°23′37″E		1220279	Upload Photo	Q26514761
Dental Surgery 22 Metres West South West of Nos 7 and 9	II	King Street			7 June 1972	TF6157420087; 52°45′15″N 0°23′34″E		1195321	Upload Photo	Q26489909
Guildhall of St George	I	King Street	theatre building		1 December 1951	TF6161820224; 52°45′20″N 0°23′36″E		1290960	Guildhall of St George More images	Q17536541
Health Centre 29 Metres West of Nos 7 and 9	II	King Street			9 December 1988	TF6156520096; 52°45′16″N 0°23′33″E		1220239	Upload Photo	Q26514725
Health Centre 5 Metres South West of Nos 7 and 9	II*	King Street			9 December 1988	TF6159220086; 52°45′15″N 0°23′35″E		1220209	Upload Photo	Q17555305
King's Lynn Centre for the Arts and King's Lynn Players Rehearsal Rooms	II	King Street			1 December 1951	TF6157020232; 52°45′20″N 0°23′34″E		1220487	Upload Photo	Q26514957
Purfleet Bridge	II	King Street			26 July 1993	TF6164220028; 52°45′13″N 0°23′37″E		1220585	Upload Photo	Q26515051
Railings to Forecourt of No 21 (old School Court)	II	King Street			7 June 1972	TF6163120180; 52°45′18″N 0°23′37″E		1195289	Upload Photo	Q26489880
Riverside Rooms Restaurant Including Watergate	II	King Street			1 December 1951	TF6151720240; 52°45′20″N 0°23′31″E		1298185	Upload Photo	Q26585704
The White Barn	II	King Street			7 June 1972	TF6160420209; 52°45′19″N 0°23′35″E		1291011	Upload Photo	Q26579169
Railings, Wall and Lamp Standard in Front of Bank House	II	King's Staithe Square			26 July 1993	TF6160919960; 52°45′11″N 0°23′35″E		1195296	Upload Photo	Q26489887
Duke's Head Hotel	II	5 - 6 Tuesday Market Place, King's Lynn, PE30 1JS	hotel		1 December 1951	TF6174320295; 52°45′22″N 0°23′43″E		1212229	Duke's Head Hotel More images	Q5312714
Tudor Rose Hotel	II*	10 - 11 St Nicholas Street, King's Lynn, PE30 1LR	hotel		1 December 1951	TF6176620413; 52°45′26″N 0°23′44″E		1298153	Tudor Rose Hotel More images	Q17555436
St Ann's House, 14, 16 and 18 St Ann's Street, and Attached Garden Wall to the Rear	II	14, 16 &18 St Ann's Street, King's Lynn, PE30 1LT			1 December 1951	TF6177820480; 52°45′28″N 0°23′45″E		1195421	Upload Photo	Q26489997
18-19 Purfleet Quay, Cellars, and Attached Wall to the East (formerly Listed As Offices of Robert Freakley and Associates)	II	18-19 Purfleet Quay, King's Lynn, PE30 1HP			1 December 1951	TF6157520059; 52°45′14″N 0°23′34″E		1195415	Upload Photo	Q26489992
Corn Exchange	II	20 Tuesday Market Place, King's Lynn, PE30 1JW	corn exchange		1 December 1951	TF6160620329; 52°45′23″N 0°23′36″E		1212488	Corn Exchange More images	Q26507447
Bank Chambers and Outbuilding to Rear	II	23 Tuesday Market Place, King's Lynn, PE30 1JW			1 December 1951	TF6167120250; 52°45′20″N 0°23′39″E		1297929	Upload Photo	Q26585463
26 St Nicholas Street	II	26 St Nicholas Street, King's Lynn, PE30 1LY			4 December 1970	TF6180120403; 52°45′25″N 0°23′46″E		1195395	Upload Photo	Q26489977
Globe Hotel	II	31 King Street, King's Lynn, PE30 1EZ			1 December 1951	TF6161620255; 52°45′21″N 0°23′36″E		1298223	Upload Photo	Q26585738
33 to 39 St James' Street, Including Premises Occupied by Kwik Fit	II	33-39 St. James Street, King's Lynn, PE30 5BZ			7 February 2019	TF6198319840; 52°45′07″N 0°23′55″E		1459413	Upload Photo	Q61654464
Lattice House	II*	37-41 Chapel Street, King's Lynn, PE30 1EG	pub		1 December 1951	TF6181420329; 52°45′23″N 0°23′47″E		1291415	Lattice House More images	Q17555417
78 Chapel Street	II	78 Chapel Street, King's Lynn, PE30 1EF			7 June 1972	TF6182020411; 52°45′25″N 0°23′47″E		1291370	Upload Photo	Q26579490
Listergate, 80 Chapel Street and Associated Boundary Wall	II	80 Chapel Street, King's Lynn, PE30 1EF			7 June 1972	TF6182420424; 52°45′26″N 0°23′48″E		1195344	Upload Photo	Q26489933
Chapel of St Nicholas	I	King's Lynn, PE30 1NH	chapel		1 December 1951	TF6185320455; 52°45′27″N 0°23′49″E		1210545	Chapel of St Nicholas More images	Q17536467
Former Police Call Box	II	60a Wootton Road, King's Lynn, PE30 4EX			17 November 2022	TF6363420757; 52°45′35″N 0°25′25″E		1478659	Upload Photo	Q122214018
Gaywood War Memorial Clock Tower	II	King's Lynn, PE30 4PR	war memorial		23 November 2015	TF6342620471; 52°45′26″N 0°25′13″E		1427282	Gaywood War Memorial Clock Tower More images	Q26677336
Our Lady of the Annunciation and Attached Presbytery, King's Lynn	II	King's Lynn, PE30 5HQ	church building		7 November 2022	TF6222319428; 52°44′53″N 0°24′07″E		1481880	Our Lady of the Annunciation and Attached Presbytery, King's Lynn More images	Q112221504
Sommerfeld and Thomas Warehouse	II	King's Lynn	architectural structure		1 December 1951	TF6167819687; 52°45′02″N 0°23′39″E		1195401	Sommerfeld and Thomas Warehouse More images	Q26489982
The Conservancy Board and Pilots' Office	II	King's Lynn, PE30 1LJ			7 June 1972	TF6155620303; 52°45′22″N 0°23′33″E		1195305	Upload Photo	Q26489896
1, King's Staithe Lane	II	1, King's Staithe Lane			4 December 1970	TF6165119954; 52°45′11″N 0°23′38″E		1220611	Upload Photo	Q26515077
3,3a, King's Staithe Square	II	3, 3a, King's Staithe Square			1 December 1951	TF6162119970; 52°45′11″N 0°23′36″E		1290882	Upload Photo	Q26579050
4,5, King's Staithe Square	II	4, 5, King's Staithe Square			1 December 1951	TF6162219959; 52°45′11″N 0°23′36″E		1298186	Upload Photo	Q26585705
Bank House	II*	King's Staithe Square			1 December 1951	TF6160419948; 52°45′11″N 0°23′35″E		1220654	Upload Photo	Q17555308
The Bank	II	King's Staithe Square			1 December 1951	TF6159819964; 52°45′11″N 0°23′35″E		1290849	Upload Photo	Q26579020
5, Littleport Street	II	5, Littleport Street			7 June 1972	TF6226820349; 52°45′23″N 0°24′11″E		1195297	Upload Photo	Q26489888
17, Littleport Street	II	17, Littleport Street			7 June 1972	TF6231820378; 52°45′24″N 0°24′14″E		1220738	Upload Photo	Q26515192
Hob in the Well Public House	II	Littleport Street			26 July 1993	TF6234520349; 52°45′23″N 0°24′15″E		1298187	Hob in the Well Public House More images	Q26585706
Length of Town Wall	II*	Littleport Terrace			1 December 1951	TF6237220264; 52°45′20″N 0°24′17″E		1220776	Upload Photo	Q17555316
Former Lloyd's Bank, 1 Tuesday Market Place	II	Lloyds Tsb Bank Plc, 1 Tuesday Market Place, King's Lynn, PE30 1JU			28 August 2018	TF6173520264; 52°45′21″N 0°23′43″E		1450427	Upload Photo	Q66479053
23,24, London Road	II	23, 24, London Road			7 June 1972	TF6225219491; 52°44′55″N 0°24′09″E		1195298	Upload Photo	Q26489889
25, London Road	II	25, London Road			7 June 1972	TF6225519481; 52°44′55″N 0°24′09″E		1290784	Upload Photo	Q26578961
32-35, London Road	II	32-35, London Road			7 June 1972	TF6228719413; 52°44′53″N 0°24′10″E		1195299	Upload Photo	Q26489890
Charford House and Attached Railings	II	49, London Road			7 June 1972	TF6227019311; 52°44′49″N 0°24′09″E		1220844	Upload Photo	Q26515287
Buckingham Terrace	II	60-77a, London Road			1 December 1951	TF6221019236; 52°44′47″N 0°24′06″E		1195300	Upload Photo	Q26489891
79, London Road	II	79, London Road			7 June 1972	TF6224719333; 52°44′50″N 0°24′08″E		1290764	Upload Photo	Q26578944
88, London Road	II	88, London Road			7 June 1972	TF6225819373; 52°44′51″N 0°24′09″E		1195301	Upload Photo	Q26489893
89,90, London Road	II	89, 90, London Road			1 December 1951	TF6225919384; 52°44′52″N 0°24′09″E		1290754	Upload Photo	Q26578935
No 91 and Attached Railings	II	91, London Road			7 June 1972	TF6225919395; 52°44′52″N 0°24′09″E		1220942	Upload Photo	Q26515378
92,93,94, London Road	II	92, 93, 94, London Road			1 December 1951	TF6225819408; 52°44′53″N 0°24′09″E		1195302	Upload Photo	Q26489894
95,96,97, London Road	II	95, 96, 97, London Road			1 December 1951	TF6223419454; 52°44′54″N 0°24′08″E		1220999	Upload Photo	Q26515433
104, London Road	II	104, London Road			7 June 1972	TF6218819521; 52°44′56″N 0°24′05″E		1195303	Upload Photo	Q26489895
105, London Road	II	105, London Road			7 June 1972	TF6218319531; 52°44′57″N 0°24′05″E		1221002	Upload Photo	Q26515434
Kings Lynn Library	II	London Road, King's Lynn, PE30 5EZ			20 April 1982	TF6207919728; 52°45′03″N 0°24′00″E		1195423	Upload Photo	Q26489999
London Road Methodist Church	II	London Road, King's Lynn, PE30 5PT			7 June 1972	TF6212019784; 52°45′05″N 0°24′02″E		1210689	Upload Photo	Q26505734
The South Gate, King's Lynn	I	London Road, King's Lynn, PE30 5EU	gate		1 December 1951	TF6219919157; 52°44′45″N 0°24′05″E		1195304	The South Gate, King's Lynn More images	Q17536421
Bishop's Terrace	II	71-77, Lynn Road, Gaywood			1 December 1951	TF6341620485; 52°45′26″N 0°25′13″E		1195429	Upload Photo	Q26490004
1-8, Market Lane	II	1-8, Market Lane			4 December 1970	TF6178120339; 52°45′23″N 0°23′45″E		1298133	Upload Photo	Q26585659
The Lynn Museum (formerly the Union Baptist Chapel)	II	Market Street			17 July 2000	TF6200820054; 52°45′14″N 0°23′57″E		1382343	Upload Photo	Q26662392
Hampton Court	I	1, 3, 5, Nelson Street	merchant's house		1 December 1951	TF6173519740; 52°45′04″N 0°23′42″E		1195430	Hampton Court More images	Q17536459
2, Nelson Street	II*	2, Nelson Street	building		1 December 1951	TF6174519746; 52°45′04″N 0°23′42″E		1195431	2, Nelson Street More images	Q17555188
4,6, Nelson Street	II	4, 6, Nelson Street			1 December 1951	TF6175519733; 52°45′04″N 0°23′43″E		1195432	Upload Photo	Q26490006
8,10, Nelson Street	II	8, 10, Nelson Street			1 December 1951	TF6176219724; 52°45′03″N 0°23′43″E		1195433	Upload Photo	Q26490007
9, Nelson Street	II*	9, Nelson Street	building		1 December 1951	TF6174619722; 52°45′03″N 0°23′42″E		1195434	9, Nelson Street More images	Q17555210
Burnham House and Attached Walls	II*	11, 13, Nelson Street			1 December 1951	TF6175519709; 52°45′03″N 0°23′43″E		1195435	Upload Photo	Q17555223
12, Nelson Street	II	12, Nelson Street			1 December 1951	TF6177019717; 52°45′03″N 0°23′43″E		1195436	Upload Photo	Q26490008
14-20, Nelson Street	II	14-20, Nelson Street			7 June 1972	TF6178119708; 52°45′03″N 0°23′44″E		1195437	Upload Photo	Q26490009
15,17, Nelson Street	II*	15, 17, Nelson Street			1 December 1951	TF6177619686; 52°45′02″N 0°23′44″E		1221095	Upload Photo	Q17555322
Oxley House	II*	19, Nelson Street			1 December 1951	TF6179119672; 52°45′02″N 0°23′45″E		1298134	Upload Photo	Q17555433
22-28, Nelson Street	II	22-28, Nelson Street			1 December 1951	TF6179419691; 52°45′02″N 0°23′45″E		1290631	Upload Photo	Q26578818
Ladybridge House	II	30, Nelson Street			1 December 1951	TF6180419681; 52°45′02″N 0°23′45″E		1290641	Upload Photo	Q26578827
36, Nelson Street	II	36, Nelson Street			7 June 1972	TF6184019688; 52°45′02″N 0°23′47″E		1290610	Upload Photo	Q26578797
Garden Walls to South and East of No 30 (ladybridge House)	II	Nelson Street			7 June 1972	TF6182619686; 52°45′02″N 0°23′46″E		1195438	Upload Photo	Q26490010
The Maltings	II	Nelson Street	architectural structure		12 September 1969	TF6181419659; 52°45′01″N 0°23′46″E		1195439	The Maltings More images	Q26490011
5, Norfolk Street	II	5, Norfolk Street			1 December 1951	TF6178420179; 52°45′18″N 0°23′45″E		1221200	Upload Photo	Q26515611
6, Norfolk Street	II	6, Norfolk Street			1 December 1951	TF6179320179; 52°45′18″N 0°23′46″E		1298135	Upload Photo	Q26585660
26, Norfolk Street	II	26, Norfolk Street			26 July 1993	TF6195820240; 52°45′20″N 0°23′54″E		1221226	Upload Photo	Q26515636
37,38, Norfolk Street	II	37, 38, Norfolk Street			26 July 1993	TF6202020259; 52°45′20″N 0°23′58″E		1195440	Upload Photo	Q26490012
51,52,53, Norfolk Street	II	51, 52, 53, Norfolk Street			5 March 1982	TF6211720284; 52°45′21″N 0°24′03″E		1210194	Upload Photo	Q26505239
61, Norfolk Street	II	61, Norfolk Street			2 February 1979	TF6215920298; 52°45′21″N 0°24′05″E		1298136	Upload Photo	Q26585661
74,75, Norfolk Street	II	74, 75, Norfolk Street			7 June 1972	TF6219120327; 52°45′22″N 0°24′07″E		1210216	Upload Photo	Q26505262
99,100, Norfolk Street	II	99, 100, Norfolk Street			1 December 1951	TF6204120281; 52°45′21″N 0°23′59″E		1195441	Upload Photo	Q26490013
117,118, Norfolk Street	II	117, 118, Norfolk Street			26 July 1993	TF6193620250; 52°45′20″N 0°23′53″E		1210228	Upload Photo	Q26505274
142, Norfolk Street	II	142, Norfolk Street			7 June 1972	TF6179120202; 52°45′19″N 0°23′45″E		1298137	Upload Photo	Q26585662
True's Yard	II	5 & 6, North Street			5 June 2009	TF6184320524; 52°45′29″N 0°23′49″E		1393313	Upload Photo	Q99937422
Warehouse on South Side, Now Flats and Shops	II	Now Flats And Shops, King's Staithe Lane			1 December 1951	TF6162319936; 52°45′10″N 0°23′36″E		1195295	Upload Photo	Q26489886
Cobblestone Cottage	II	24, Pilot Street			7 June 1972	TF6191720460; 52°45′27″N 0°23′53″E		1210242	Upload Photo	Q26505287
26, Pilot Street	II	26, Pilot Street			7 June 1972	TF6192020469; 52°45′27″N 0°23′53″E		1195442	Upload Photo	Q26490014
28, Pilot Street	II	28, Pilot Street			7 June 1972	TF6192220475; 52°45′27″N 0°23′53″E		1210258	Upload Photo	Q26505304
30,32, Pilot Street	II*	30, 32, Pilot Street			1 December 1951	TF6192420482; 52°45′28″N 0°23′53″E		1195408	Upload Photo	Q17555144
Railings and Gates to South and East of St Nicholas' Churchyard	II	Pilot Street			26 July 1993	TF6188620430; 52°45′26″N 0°23′51″E		1195409	Upload Photo	Q26489989
Nos 3-15 (odd) and Attached Area Railings	II	3-15, Portland Street			7 June 1972	TF6218120117; 52°45′16″N 0°24′06″E		1195410	Upload Photo	Q26489990
5,6,7, Priory Lane	II	5, 6, 7, Priory Lane			7 June 1972	TF6178619743; 52°45′04″N 0°23′44″E		1195411	Upload Photo	Q26489991
12-20, Priory Lane	II*	12-20, Priory Lane			1 December 1951	TF6177919758; 52°45′04″N 0°23′44″E		1195412	Upload Photo	Q17555156
14,15, Purfleet Fleet	II	14, 15, Purfleet Fleet			1 December 1951	TF6164920055; 52°45′14″N 0°23′38″E		1298163	Upload Photo	Q26585685
1,2,3, Purfleet Place	II*	1, 2, 3, Purfleet Place			1 December 1951	TF6163120001; 52°45′12″N 0°23′37″E		1195413	Upload Photo	Q17555168
Customs House Including North Bank of Purfleet Quay	I	Purfleet Quay, King's Lynn, PE30 1HP	architectural structure		7 June 1972	TF6162720042; 52°45′14″N 0°23′36″E		1195414	Customs House Including North Bank of Purfleet Quay More images	Q17536454
15, Queen Street	II	15, Queen Street			4 December 1970	TF6165919959; 52°45′11″N 0°23′38″E		1195416	Upload Photo	Q26489993
Clifton House	I	17, Queen Street	house		1 December 1951	TF6165319937; 52°45′10″N 0°23′38″E		1210377	Clifton House More images	Q17536463
19b,19c,21, Queen Street	II	19b, 19c, 21, Queen Street			1 December 1951	TF6164919909; 52°45′09″N 0°23′37″E		1298124	Upload Photo	Q26585651
25, Queen Street	II*	25, Queen Street			1 December 1951	TF6165219886; 52°45′09″N 0°23′37″E		1210409	Upload Photo	Q17555253
Thoresby College	I	31, 33, Queen Street	architectural structure		1 December 1951	TF6167319849; 52°45′07″N 0°23′39″E		1195418	Thoresby College More images	Q7796200
19a, Queen Street	II	19a, Queen Street			1 December 1951	TF6165619923; 52°45′10″N 0°23′38″E		1210384	Upload Photo	Q26505434
23a,23b, Queen Street	II	23a, 23b, Queen Street			1 December 1951	TF6165019896; 52°45′09″N 0°23′37″E		1210396	Upload Photo	Q26505447
27a,27b, Queen Street	II	27a, 27b, Queen Street			1 December 1951	TF6165419876; 52°45′08″N 0°23′38″E		1298125	Upload Photo	Q26585652
29a,29b, Queen Street	II*	29a, 29b, Queen Street			1 December 1951	TF6165919864; 52°45′08″N 0°23′38″E		1290483	Upload Photo	Q17555401
Burkitt Homes	II	Queen Street	architectural structure		7 June 1972	TF6167119888; 52°45′09″N 0°23′39″E		1210433	Burkitt Homes More images	Q26505485
Sundial in Courtyard of Burkitt Homes	II	Queen Street			7 June 1972	TF6168419892; 52°45′09″N 0°23′39″E		1195419	Upload Photo	Q26489995
Town Hall	II	Queen Street			7 June 1972	TF6169319862; 52°45′08″N 0°23′40″E		1298126	Upload Photo	Q26585653
Wall Behind No 23	II	Queen Street			26 July 1993	TF6163319888; 52°45′09″N 0°23′36″E		1195417	Upload Photo	Q26489994
1, Saturday Market Place	II	1, Saturday Market Place			7 June 1972	TF6181219835; 52°45′07″N 0°23′46″E		1290081	Upload Photo	Q26578318
2, Saturday Market Place	II	2, Saturday Market Place			7 June 1972	TF6180519837; 52°45′07″N 0°23′46″E		1195397	Upload Photo	Q26489979
3, Saturday Market Place	II	3, Saturday Market Place			7 June 1972	TF6180119839; 52°45′07″N 0°23′45″E		1211303	Upload Photo	Q26506320
4, Saturday Market Place	II	4, Saturday Market Place			7 June 1972	TF6179619840; 52°45′07″N 0°23′45″E		1298155	Upload Photo	Q26585677
5, Saturday Market Place	II	5, Saturday Market Place			7 June 1972	TF6179019842; 52°45′07″N 0°23′45″E		1211313	Upload Photo	Q26506330
6, Saturday Market Place	II	6, Saturday Market Place			7 June 1972	TF6178619843; 52°45′07″N 0°23′45″E		1195398	Upload Photo	Q26489980
Wenn's Hotel	II	8, 9, Saturday Market Place			1 December 1951	TF6174619852; 52°45′07″N 0°23′42″E		1211321	Upload Photo	Q26506337
Charter House Restaurant	II	10, 11, Saturday Market Place			1 December 1951	TF6173719849; 52°45′07″N 0°23′42″E		1298156	Upload Photo	Q26585678
Assembly Rooms Immediately Behind Guildhall	II	Saturday Market Place			7 June 1972	TF6172619881; 52°45′08″N 0°23′41″E		1195400	Upload Photo	Q26489981
Church of St Margaret	I	Saturday Market Place	church building		1 December 1951	TF6177219806; 52°45′06″N 0°23′44″E		1211336	Upload Photo	Q6410996
Gaolhouse	II*	Saturday Market Place	building		1 December 1951	TF6172919860; 52°45′08″N 0°23′42″E		1195399	Gaolhouse More images	Q17555131
Guildhall	I	Saturday Market Place	city hall		1 December 1951	TF6171619861; 52°45′08″N 0°23′41″E		1211953	Guildhall More images	Q17536470
Majestic Cinema	II	1 and 2, Sedgeford Lane	movie theater		12 March 1999	TF6189519951; 52°45′11″N 0°23′51″E		1271798	Majestic Cinema More images	Q6737690
7, South Lynn Plain	II	7, South Lynn Plain			1 December 1951	TF6203219499; 52°44′56″N 0°23′57″E		1289760	Upload Photo	Q26578031
8,9, South Quay	II	8, 9, South Quay			1 December 1951	TF6167519714; 52°45′03″N 0°23′38″E		1298157	Upload Photo	Q26585679
Hanse House	I	South Quay, King's Lynn	house		1 December 1951	TF6172719766; 52°45′05″N 0°23′41″E		1195393	Hanse House More images	Q17536439
Marriott's Warehouse	II*	South Quay	warehouse		1 December 1951	TF6165619761; 52°45′05″N 0°23′37″E		1212000	Marriott's Warehouse More images	Q17555261
3,4,5, Southgate Street	II	3, 4, 5, Southgate Street			1 December 1951	TF6209719243; 52°44′47″N 0°24′00″E		1212018	Upload Photo	Q26507006
7,8, Southgate Street	II	7, 8, Southgate Street			1 December 1951	TF6210819235; 52°44′47″N 0°24′01″E		1298158	Upload Photo	Q26585680
9,10,11, Southgate Street	II	9, 10, 11, Southgate Street			1 December 1951	TF6211419229; 52°44′47″N 0°24′01″E		1212023	Upload Photo	Q26507011
7, St Ann's Fort	II	7, St Ann's Fort			7 June 1972	TF6181320545; 52°45′30″N 0°23′47″E		1210464	Upload Photo	Q26505511
Watergate of St Ann's Fort and Associated Wall	II	St Ann's Fort, King's Lynn, PE30 2EU			1 December 1951	TF6184520591; 52°45′31″N 0°23′49″E		1195420	Upload Photo	Q26489996
4,6, St Ann's Street	II*	4, 6, St Ann's Street			1 December 1951	TF6181220532; 52°45′29″N 0°23′47″E		1298127	Upload Photo	Q17555429
12, St Ann's Street	II	12, St Ann's Street			1 December 1951	TF6180720509; 52°45′29″N 0°23′47″E		1210529	Upload Photo	Q26505576
2a,2b,2c, St Ann's Street	II*	2a, 2b, 2c, St Ann's Street			1 December 1951	TF6181520540; 52°45′30″N 0°23′47″E		1210489	Upload Photo	Q17555258
Gates and Railings to West of St Nicholas' Churchyard, St Ann's Street	II	St Ann's Street			7 June 1972	TF6180820456; 52°45′27″N 0°23′47″E		1195422	Upload Photo	Q26489998
Table Tomb 3 Metres South of South Porch of Chapel of St Nicholas	II	St Ann's Street			26 July 1993	TF6183020436; 52°45′26″N 0°23′48″E		1290410	Upload Photo	Q26578616
The Smokehouse	II	5a, St Ann's Street, True's Yard			5 June 2009	TF6183320516; 52°45′29″N 0°23′48″E		1393314	Upload Photo	Q26672486
6, St Edmunds Terrace	II	6, St Edmunds Terrace			16 April 2009	TF6129721034; 52°45′46″N 0°23′21″E		1393229	Upload Photo	Q26672408
Framingham's Hospital	II	St James' Road			7 June 1972	TF6219519699; 52°45′02″N 0°24′06″E		1298128	Upload Photo	Q26585654
White Hart Public House	II	1, St James' Street			7 June 1972	TF6182219831; 52°45′07″N 0°23′46″E		1210697	White Hart Public House More images	Q26505742
3,5, St James' Street	II	3, 5, St James' Street			7 June 1972	TF6182919830; 52°45′07″N 0°23′47″E		1298129	Upload Photo	Q26585655
6-14, St James' Street	II	6-14, St James' Street			1 December 1951	TF6184919814; 52°45′06″N 0°23′48″E		1210714	Upload Photo	Q26505760
7, St James' Street	II	7, St James' Street			7 June 1972	TF6184619833; 52°45′07″N 0°23′48″E		1195424	Upload Photo	Q26490000
15, St James' Street	II	15, St James' Street			7 June 1972	TF6190019831; 52°45′07″N 0°23′51″E		1210740	Upload Photo	Q26505786
16, St James' Street	II	16, St James' Street			7 June 1972	TF6187819815; 52°45′06″N 0°23′49″E		1195425	Upload Photo	Q26490001
17, St James' Street	II	17, St James' Street			7 June 1972	TF6190419830; 52°45′07″N 0°23′51″E		1210767	Upload Photo	Q26505813
18, St James' Street	II	18, St James' Street			7 June 1972	TF6189019812; 52°45′06″N 0°23′50″E		1298130	Upload Photo	Q26585656
20,20a, St James' Street	II	20, 20a, St James' Street			7 June 1972	TF6189719812; 52°45′06″N 0°23′50″E		1210797	Upload Photo	Q26505840
21,23, St James' Street	II	21, 23, St James' Street			7 June 1972	TF6192219829; 52°45′07″N 0°23′52″E		1195426	Upload Photo	Q26490002
22, St James' Street	II	22, St James' Street			7 June 1972	TF6190419812; 52°45′06″N 0°23′51″E		1210807	Upload Photo	Q26505851
24, St James' Street	II	24, St James' Street			7 June 1972	TF6191219812; 52°45′06″N 0°23′51″E		1298131	Upload Photo	Q26585657
25, St James' Street	II	25, St James' Street			7 June 1972	TF6192819828; 52°45′07″N 0°23′52″E		1210841	Upload Photo	Q26505883
26, St James' Street	II	26, St James' Street			7 June 1972	TF6191819812; 52°45′06″N 0°23′52″E		1195427	Upload Photo	Q26490003
27, St James' Street	II	27, St James' Street			7 June 1972	TF6193419828; 52°45′06″N 0°23′52″E		1210863	Upload Photo	Q26505905
28, St James' Street	II	28, St James' Street			7 June 1972	TF6192419812; 52°45′06″N 0°23′52″E		1298132	Upload Photo	Q26585658
30, St James' Street	II	30, St James' Street			7 June 1972	TF6193119811; 52°45′06″N 0°23′52″E		1210900	Upload Photo	Q26505942
Greyfriars Tower in Tower Gardens	I	St James' Street	tower		1 December 1951	TF6201219787; 52°45′05″N 0°23′56″E		1195428	Greyfriars Tower in Tower Gardens More images	Q17536458
Stone Arches in Tower Gardens	II	St James' Street	architectural structure		1 December 1951	TF6204019732; 52°45′03″N 0°23′58″E		1290265	Stone Arches in Tower Gardens More images	Q26578483
War Memorial in Tower Gardens	II	St James' Street	war memorial		26 July 1993	TF6204919763; 52°45′04″N 0°23′58″E		1195387	War Memorial in Tower Gardens More images	Q26489972
Cannon Bollard at Junction with South Quay	II	St Margaret's Lane			15 April 1977	TF6166819724; 52°45′03″N 0°23′38″E		1195388	Upload Photo	Q26489973
Warehouse and Training Ship Vancouver	II	St Margaret's Lane			1 December 1951	TF6168519727; 52°45′03″N 0°23′39″E		1195389	Upload Photo	Q26489974
1, St Margaret's Place	II*	1, St Margaret's Place			7 June 1972	TF6169619829; 52°45′07″N 0°23′40″E		1195390	Upload Photo	Q17555096
2, St Margaret's Place	II*	2, St Margaret's Place			1 December 1951	TF6170419808; 52°45′06″N 0°23′40″E		1195391	Upload Photo	Q17555117
Garden Wall and Gates to St Margaret's Vicarage	II	St Margaret's Place			7 June 1972	TF6172319784; 52°45′05″N 0°23′41″E		1195394	Upload Photo	Q26489976
St Margaret's Vicarage	II	St Margaret's Place			1 December 1951	TF6171019794; 52°45′06″N 0°23′40″E		1298152	Upload Photo	Q26585675
Ruins of Doorway	II	St Nicholas Street			4 December 1970	TF6175220395; 52°45′25″N 0°23′44″E		1290124	Upload Photo	Q26578359
114 and 116, St Peter's Road	II	114 and 116, St Peter's Road, West Lynn			7 June 1972	TF6120720025; 52°45′14″N 0°23′14″E		1298154	Upload Photo	Q26585676
170-176, St Peter's Road	II	170-176, St Peter's Road, West Lynn			7 June 1972	TF6117220293; 52°45′22″N 0°23′13″E		1290102	Upload Photo	Q26578338
Church of St Peter	II*	St Peter's Road, West Lynn	church building		1 December 1951	TF6121019736; 52°45′04″N 0°23′14″E		1290105	Church of St Peter More images	Q17555388
Marlborough House	II	St Peter's Road, West Lynn			7 June 1972	TF6114919754; 52°45′05″N 0°23′10″E		1195396	Upload Photo	Q26489978
West Lynn War Memorial	II	St Peter's Road, West Lynn, King's Lynn, PE34 3JX	war memorial		18 March 2019	TF6120019755; 52°45′05″N 0°23′13″E		1457777	West Lynn War Memorial More images	Q62281158
1, Stonegate Street	II	1, Stonegate Street			1 December 1951	TF6194319718; 52°45′03″N 0°23′53″E		1212024	Upload Photo	Q26507012
9, Stonegate Street	II	9, Stonegate Street			7 June 1972	TF6186619699; 52°45′02″N 0°23′49″E		1195402	Upload Photo	Q26489983
10, Stonegate Street	II	10, Stonegate Street			24 May 1973	TF6185819696; 52°45′02″N 0°23′48″E		1289714	Upload Photo	Q26577996
Walls Enclosing Jewish Cemetery	II	Stonegate Street			26 July 1993	TF6201519686; 52°45′02″N 0°23′56″E		1298159	Upload Photo	Q26585681
Northern Gateway to Carmelite Precinct	II*	The Friars	gate		1 December 1951	TF6188019500; 52°44′56″N 0°23′49″E		1212056	Northern Gateway to Carmelite Precinct More images	Q17555265
Red Mount Chapel	I	The Walks	chapel		1 December 1951	TF6247019842; 52°45′06″N 0°24′21″E		1195403	Red Mount Chapel More images	Q17536451
Trader Building	II	21, Tower Street			28 January 1983	TF6194119906; 52°45′09″N 0°23′53″E		1212185	Upload Photo	Q26507161
Whincop House	II	29, Tower Street			7 June 1972	TF6194719887; 52°45′08″N 0°23′53″E		1195404	Upload Photo	Q26489984
National Westminster Bank	II	4, Tuesday Market Place			1 December 1951	TF6173320287; 52°45′22″N 0°23′43″E		1289635	Upload Photo	Q26577932
Mayden's Heade Hotel	II	7, Tuesday Market Place			1 December 1951	TF6173120327; 52°45′23″N 0°23′42″E		1195405	Upload Photo	Q26489985
8, Tuesday Market Place	II	8, Tuesday Market Place			26 July 1993	TF6173220338; 52°45′23″N 0°23′43″E		1212269	Upload Photo	Q26507234
10, Tuesday Market Place	II	10, Tuesday Market Place			1 December 1951	TF6172720353; 52°45′24″N 0°23′42″E		1298161	Upload Photo	Q26585683
11,12, Tuesday Market Place (see Details for Further Address Information)	II	11, 12, Tuesday Market Place			4 December 1970	TF6172720378; 52°45′25″N 0°23′42″E		1212284	Upload Photo	Q26507245
14,14a, Tuesday Market Place	II	14, 14a, Tuesday Market Place			1 December 1951	TF6169820391; 52°45′25″N 0°23′41″E		1195406	Upload Photo	Q26489986
15,16, Tuesday Market Place	II*	15, 16, Tuesday Market Place			1 December 1951	TF6168120388; 52°45′25″N 0°23′40″E		1212298	Upload Photo	Q17555274
17,17a, Tuesday Market Place	II	17, 17a, Tuesday Market Place			1 December 1951	TF6166020380; 52°45′25″N 0°23′39″E		1195407	Upload Photo	Q26489987
Bishop's Lynn House	II*	18, Tuesday Market Place			1 December 1951	TF6164820361; 52°45′24″N 0°23′38″E		1289527	Upload Photo	Q17555384
19, Tuesday Market Place	II	19, Tuesday Market Place			1 December 1951	TF6164120344; 52°45′23″N 0°23′38″E		1298162	Upload Photo	Q26585684
Barclay's Bank	II	21, Tuesday Market Place			1 December 1951	TF6162320297; 52°45′22″N 0°23′37″E		1195815	Upload Photo	Q26490385
24, Tuesday Market Place	II	24, Tuesday Market Place			1 December 1951	TF6168120253; 52°45′21″N 0°23′40″E		1212515	Upload Photo	Q26507473
27,28, Tuesday Market Place	II	27, 28, Tuesday Market Place			1 December 1951	TF6170320255; 52°45′21″N 0°23′41″E		1195816	Upload Photo	Q26490386
65, High Street (see Details for Further Address Information)	II	29, Tuesday Market Place			1 December 1951	TF6171320255; 52°45′21″N 0°23′41″E		1289485	Upload Photo	Q26577798
Cannon Bollard to Rear of No 21	II	Tuesday Market Place			15 April 1977	TF6158620295; 52°45′22″N 0°23′35″E		1212506	Upload Photo	Q26507465
House to Rear of 4	II	Tuesday Market Place			7 June 1972	TF6175020290; 52°45′22″N 0°23′43″E		1298160	Upload Photo	Q26585682
7-10, Valingers Road	II	7-10, Valingers Road			7 June 1972	TF6212319487; 52°44′55″N 0°24′02″E		1297930	Upload Photo	Q26585464
14, Valingers Road	II	14, Valingers Road			7 June 1972	TF6216219485; 52°44′55″N 0°24′04″E		1212542	Upload Photo	Q26507501

== See also ==
- Grade I listed buildings in Norfolk
- Grade II* listed buildings in Norfolk

== Sources ==
- Wilson, Bill; Pevsner, Nikolaus (1999) [1962], Norfolk 2: North-West and South, The Buildings of England, New Haven and London: Yale University Press, ISBN 978-0-300-09657-6
