= Listed buildings in Downham Market =

Historic structures in Norfolk, England

Downham Market is a village and civil parish in the King's Lynn and West Norfolk district of Norfolk, England. It contains 119 listed buildings that are recorded in the National Heritage List for England. Of these one is grade I and 118 are grade II.

This list is based on the information retrieved online from Historic England.

== Key ==
Grade	Criteria
I	Buildings that are of exceptional interest
II*	Particularly important buildings of more than special interest
II	Buildings that are of special interest

== Listing ==
Name	Grade	Location	Type	Completed (Note: The date given is the date used by Historic England as significant for the initial building or that of an important part in the structure's description.)	Date designated	Grid ref. (Note: The grid reference is based on the British national grid reference system, sometimes known as OSGB36, used by the Ordnance Survey.) Geo-coordinates	Notes	Entry number (Note: The "List Entry Number" is a unique number assigned to each listed building and scheduled monument by Historic England.)	Image	Wikidata
Church of St Edmund	I		church building		24 February 1949	TF6127903305; 52°36′13″N 0°22′48″E		1342608	Church of St Edmund More images	Q17536686
Downham Market War Memorial	II		war memorial		27 February 2018	TF6116703083; 52°36′06″N 0°22′42″E		1453656	Downham Market War Memorial More images	Q66479406
Wall at North of Churchyard of St Edmund's Church	II				16 November 1972	TF6130103358; 52°36′15″N 0°22′50″E		1077239	Upload Photo	Q26343856
Boundary Walls of Library Grounds West and South, and of Former Burial Ground	II	And Of Former Burial Ground, Bridge Street			16 November 1972	TF6076703133; 52°36′08″N 0°22′21″E		1342636	Upload Photo	Q26626580
15, Bennett Street	II	15, Bennett Street			16 November 1972	TF6040503403; 52°36′17″N 0°22′02″E		1342609	Upload Photo	Q26626557
War Memorial	II	Bexwell			11 March 2008	TF6243202784; 52°35′55″N 0°23′49″E		1393059	Upload Photo	Q26672247
3, Bexwell Road	II	3, Bexwell Road			16 November 1972	TF6130403373; 52°36′15″N 0°22′50″E		1077240	Upload Photo	Q26343860
5, Bexwell Road	II	5, Bexwell Road			16 November 1972	TF6131103371; 52°36′15″N 0°22′50″E		1077241	Upload Photo	Q26343864
Wall at North Boundary of Garden of No 1	II	Bexwell Road			16 November 1972	TF6129703407; 52°36′16″N 0°22′50″E		1342610	Upload Photo	Q26626558
Fells	II	10, Bridge Street			16 November 1972	TF6108703230; 52°36′11″N 0°22′38″E		1342611	Upload Photo	Q26626559
Crown Inn	II	12, Bridge Street			24 February 1949	TF6107703228; 52°36′11″N 0°22′38″E		1077242	Crown Inn More images	Q26343868
Hill House	II	14, Bridge Street			24 February 1949	TF6106003226; 52°36′11″N 0°22′37″E		1342612	Upload Photo	Q26626560
15, Bridge Street	II	15, Bridge Street			4 December 1957	TF6100203199; 52°36′10″N 0°22′34″E		1077207	Upload Photo	Q26343763
16, Bridge Street	II	16, Bridge Street			16 November 1972	TF6104103236; 52°36′11″N 0°22′36″E		1077244	Upload Photo	Q26343876
Nelson House	II	17, Bridge Street			16 November 1972	TF6098103199; 52°36′10″N 0°22′32″E		1077208	Upload Photo	Q26343765
20 and 24a, Bridge Street	II	20 and 24a, Bridge Street			16 November 1972	TF6102103227; 52°36′11″N 0°22′35″E		1077245	Upload Photo	Q26343880
23 and 25, Bridge Street	II	23 and 25, Bridge Street			16 November 1972	TF6095203201; 52°36′10″N 0°22′31″E		1342635	Upload Photo	Q26626579
27, Bridge Street	II	27, Bridge Street			16 November 1972	TF6094403200; 52°36′10″N 0°22′30″E		1077209	Upload Photo	Q26343768
28, Bridge Street	II	28, Bridge Street			16 November 1972	TF6098503220; 52°36′11″N 0°22′33″E		1342632	Upload Photo	Q26626576
34 and 34a, Bridge Street	II	34 and 34a, Bridge Street			16 November 1972	TF6095903218; 52°36′10″N 0°22′31″E		1077204	Upload Photo	Q26343753
38 and 40, Bridge Street	II	38 and 40, Bridge Street			16 November 1972	TF6090903221; 52°36′11″N 0°22′29″E		1077205	Upload Photo	Q26343756
42 and 44, Bridge Street	II	42 and 44, Bridge Street			16 November 1972	TF6089703220; 52°36′11″N 0°22′28″E		1342633	Upload Photo	Q26626577
47 and 49, Bridge Street	II	47 and 49, Bridge Street			16 November 1972	TF6089103203; 52°36′10″N 0°22′28″E		1077210	Upload Photo	Q26343773
51 and 53, Bridge Street	II	51 and 53, Bridge Street			16 November 1972	TF6088303203; 52°36′10″N 0°22′27″E		1077211	Upload Photo	Q26343776
55, Bridge Street	II	55, Bridge Street			16 November 1972	TF6087803204; 52°36′10″N 0°22′27″E		1077212	Upload Photo	Q26343780
57, Bridge Street	II	57, Bridge Street			16 November 1972	TF6086603204; 52°36′10″N 0°22′26″E		1077213	Upload Photo	Q26343783
59 and 61, Bridge Street	II	59 and 61, Bridge Street			16 November 1972	TF6085403203; 52°36′10″N 0°22′26″E		1170602	Upload Photo	Q26464197
60 and 64, Bridge Street	II	60 and 64, Bridge Street			4 December 1957	TF6081503212; 52°36′10″N 0°22′24″E		1077206	Upload Photo	Q26343760
71, Bridge Street	II	71, Bridge Street			16 November 1972	TF6076003182; 52°36′10″N 0°22′21″E		1077215	Upload Photo	Q26343790
82 and 84, Bridge Street	II	82 and 84, Bridge Street			26 June 1986	TF6074303206; 52°36′10″N 0°22′20″E		1077936	Upload Photo	Q26346177
16b, Bridge Street	II	16b, Bridge Street			16 November 1972	TF6103903272; 52°36′12″N 0°22′36″E		1170527	Upload Photo	Q26464101
Library (formerly Friends Meeting House)	II	Bridge Street			16 November 1972	TF6077403189; 52°36′10″N 0°22′21″E		1170618	Upload Photo	Q26464222
Town Hall	II	Bridge Street	city hall		16 November 1972	TF6107403200; 52°36′10″N 0°22′37″E		1342634	Town Hall More images	Q26626578
Walls at East and West of Ground at Rear of Number 16b	II	Bridge Street			16 November 1972	TF6103603300; 52°36′13″N 0°22′35″E		1077243	Upload Photo	Q26343871
Walls of Garden of Number 16b	II	Bridge Street			16 November 1972	TF6104803259; 52°36′12″N 0°22′36″E		1342613	Upload Photo	Q26626561
The Square Garage	II	Cannon Square			16 November 1972	TF6122003327; 52°36′14″N 0°22′45″E		1170634	Upload Photo	Q26464262
15-19, Church Road	II	15-19, Church Road			16 November 1972	TF6119803105; 52°36′07″N 0°22′44″E		1077216	Upload Photo	Q26343793
Downham Market Signal Box	II	Downham Market Railway Station, Kings Lynn And West Norfolk	signal box		26 April 2013	TF6027903292; 52°36′14″N 0°21′55″E		1414022	Downham Market Signal Box More images	Q26676387
Crow Hall	II	Downsham Road			9 November 1984	TF6128202322; 52°35′41″N 0°22′47″E		1342308	Upload Photo	Q26626324
2 and 4, High Street	II	2 and 4, High Street			16 November 1972	TF6113003121; 52°36′07″N 0°22′40″E		1170692	Upload Photo	Q26464323
3, High Street	II	3, High Street			16 November 1972	TF6114203140; 52°36′08″N 0°22′41″E		1077217	Upload Photo	Q26343798
5, High Street	II	5, High Street			16 November 1972	TF6114203147; 52°36′08″N 0°22′41″E		1342637	Upload Photo	Q26626581
13 and 13a, High Street	II	13 and 13a, High Street			16 November 1972	TF6113703173; 52°36′09″N 0°22′41″E		1170647	Upload Photo	Q26464277
15, High Street	II	15, High Street			16 November 1972	TF6113403181; 52°36′09″N 0°22′40″E		1077218	Upload Photo	Q26343801
17 and 19, High Street	II	17 and 19, High Street			4 December 1957	TF6113203193; 52°36′09″N 0°22′40″E		1342638	Upload Photo	Q26626582
26, High Street	II	26, High Street			16 November 1972	TF6111603237; 52°36′11″N 0°22′40″E		1077222	Upload Photo	Q26343814
28, High Street	II	28, High Street			16 November 1972	TF6112203240; 52°36′11″N 0°22′40″E		1170697	Upload Photo	Q26464329
30, High Street	II	30, High Street			16 November 1972	TF6112503247; 52°36′11″N 0°22′40″E		1342601	Upload Photo	Q26626550
32, High Street	II	32, High Street			16 November 1972	TF6112903254; 52°36′11″N 0°22′40″E		1077223	Upload Photo	Q26343817
33, High Street	II	33, High Street			16 November 1972	TF6114403250; 52°36′11″N 0°22′41″E		1170661	Upload Photo	Q26464292
34, High Street	II	34, High Street			16 November 1972	TF6113303261; 52°36′12″N 0°22′41″E		1170719	Upload Photo	Q26464356
35, High Street	II	35, High Street			16 November 1972	TF6115003260; 52°36′12″N 0°22′41″E		1077219	Upload Photo	Q26343804
36, High Street	II	36, High Street			16 November 1972	TF6113903273; 52°36′12″N 0°22′41″E		1077224	Upload Photo	Q26343820
37 and 39, High Street	II	37 and 39, High Street			16 November 1972	TF6116203274; 52°36′12″N 0°22′42″E		1170675	Upload Photo	Q26464306
38, High Street	II	38, High Street			16 November 1972	TF6114103277; 52°36′12″N 0°22′41″E		1305920	Upload Photo	Q26684254
45, High Street	II	45, High Street			16 November 1972	TF6117303293; 52°36′13″N 0°22′43″E		1077220	Upload Photo	Q26343808
47, High Street	II	47, High Street			16 November 1972	TF6117903301; 52°36′13″N 0°22′43″E		1342639	Upload Photo	Q26626583
48, High Street	II	48, High Street			16 November 1972	TF6116203309; 52°36′13″N 0°22′42″E		1342602	Upload Photo	Q26626551
50, High Street	II	50, High Street			16 November 1972	TF6116903317; 52°36′13″N 0°22′43″E		1077225	Upload Photo	Q26343825
52-56, High Street	II	52-56, High Street			16 November 1972	TF6120103352; 52°36′15″N 0°22′44″E		1342603	Upload Photo	Q26626552
53 and 55, High Street	II	53 and 55, High Street			16 November 1972	TF6119903320; 52°36′14″N 0°22′44″E		1170687	Upload Photo	Q26464318
57, High Street	II	57, High Street			16 November 1972	TF6120703330; 52°36′14″N 0°22′45″E		1077221	Upload Photo	Q26343810
1a, 1b and 1c, High Street	II	1a, 1b and 1c, High Street			16 November 1972	TF6114403127; 52°36′07″N 0°22′41″E		1170641	Upload Photo	Q26464271
Castle Hotel	II	High Street	hotel		24 February 1949	TF6118203335; 52°36′14″N 0°22′43″E		1170776	Castle Hotel More images	Q26464444
10, Howdale Road	II	10, Howdale Road			16 November 1972	TF6123003057; 52°36′05″N 0°22′45″E		1077182	Upload Photo	Q26343680
The Priory	II	4 and 6, London Road			24 February 1949	TF6114003086; 52°36′06″N 0°22′41″E		1077188	Upload Photo	Q26343700
5 and 7, London Road	II	5 and 7, London Road			16 November 1972	TF6115203102; 52°36′07″N 0°22′41″E		1342622	Upload Photo	Q26626566
17-23, London Road	II	17-23, London Road			16 November 1972	TF6120703046; 52°36′05″N 0°22′44″E		1077183	Upload Photo	Q26343681
25, London Road	II	25, London Road			16 November 1972	TF6123003052; 52°36′05″N 0°22′45″E		1077184	Upload Photo	Q26343686
31 and 33, London Road	II	31 and 33, London Road			16 November 1972	TF6121402960; 52°36′02″N 0°22′44″E		1077186	Upload Photo	Q26343693
Former Howdale Lodge	II	London Road			16 November 1972	TF6124803017; 52°36′04″N 0°22′46″E		1077185	Upload Photo	Q26343690
Former National School	II	London Road			16 November 1972	TF6124403048; 52°36′05″N 0°22′46″E		1342623	Upload Photo	Q26626567
Magistrates Court Complex	II	London Road			16 November 1972	TF6122202999; 52°36′03″N 0°22′45″E		1342624	Upload Photo	Q26626568
Masonic Hall (former Baptist Chapel)	II	London Road			16 November 1972	TF6122302915; 52°36′00″N 0°22′45″E		1077187	Upload Photo	Q26343696
Wall at West of Number 4 and Extending at Back of Number 2 with Return North	II	London Road			16 November 1972	TF6109803069; 52°36′05″N 0°22′38″E		1077189	Upload Photo	Q26343704
19-25, Lynn Road	II	19-25, Lynn Road			16 November 1972	TF6125603427; 52°36′17″N 0°22′47″E		1077190	Upload Photo	Q26343708
27, Lynn Road	II	27, Lynn Road			16 November 1972	TF6126103435; 52°36′17″N 0°22′48″E		1170871	Upload Photo	Q26464554
29-33, Lynn Road	II	29-33, Lynn Road			16 November 1972	TF6126403445; 52°36′17″N 0°22′48″E		1077191	Upload Photo	Q26343709
58, Lynn Road	II	58, Lynn Road			16 November 1972	TF6132503524; 52°36′20″N 0°22′51″E		1170886	Upload Photo	Q26464568
The Retreat	II	Lynn Road			16 November 1972	TF6147603509; 52°36′19″N 0°22′59″E		1077193	Upload Photo	Q26343716
Walls of Garden of Number 58	II	Lynn Road			16 November 1972	TF6137103513; 52°36′20″N 0°22′54″E		1077192	Upload Photo	Q26343713
2 and 3, Market Place	II	2 and 3, Market Place			16 November 1972	TF6110003196; 52°36′10″N 0°22′39″E		1305843	Upload Photo	Q26592673
4 and 5, Market Place	II	4 and 5, Market Place			16 November 1972	TF6108903197; 52°36′10″N 0°22′38″E		1077194	Upload Photo	Q26343719
6, Market Place	II	6, Market Place			16 November 1972	TF6108303198; 52°36′10″N 0°22′38″E		1342625	Upload Photo	Q26626569
8 and 9, Market Place	II	8 and 9, Market Place			16 November 1972	TF6110003232; 52°36′11″N 0°22′39″E		1171102	Upload Photo	Q26464891
The Corn Shop	II	10, Market Place			16 November 1972	TF6110803231; 52°36′11″N 0°22′39″E		1077195	Upload Photo	Q26343723
11 and 12, Market Place	II	11 and 12, Market Place			16 November 1972	TF6113103218; 52°36′10″N 0°22′40″E		1342626	Upload Photo	Q26626570
13, Market Place	II	13, Market Place			4 December 1957	TF6113103206; 52°36′10″N 0°22′40″E		1077196	Upload Photo	Q26343726
Clock Tower South East of Number 10	II	Market Place	clock tower		16 November 1972	TF6111703219; 52°36′10″N 0°22′40″E		1171110	Clock Tower South East of Number 10 More images	Q26464907
17, Paradise Road	II	17, Paradise Road			16 November 1972	TF6108203371; 52°36′15″N 0°22′38″E		1171124	Upload Photo	Q26464945
21, Paradise Road	II	21, Paradise Road			16 November 1972	TF6101303387; 52°36′16″N 0°22′34″E		1305749	Upload Photo	Q26592584
32-38, Paradise Road	II	32-38, Paradise Road			16 November 1972	TF6104403365; 52°36′15″N 0°22′36″E		1077198	Upload Photo	Q26343731
52 and 54, Paradise Road	II	52 and 54, Paradise Road			16 November 1972	TF6081203301; 52°36′13″N 0°22′24″E		1171156	Upload Photo	Q26464987
Front Wall of Ex-service Men's Club	II	Paradise Road			16 November 1972	TF6104503380; 52°36′16″N 0°22′36″E		1342627	Upload Photo	Q26626571
Workshop South of Number 21	II	Paradise Road			16 November 1972	TF6101903376; 52°36′16″N 0°22′35″E		1077197	Upload Photo	Q26343728
39 and 41, Priory Road	II	39 and 41, Priory Road			16 November 1972	TF6096503117; 52°36′07″N 0°22′31″E		1077199	Upload Photo	Q26343735
Priory Cottages	II	44-56, Priory Road			16 November 1972	TF6087703120; 52°36′07″N 0°22′27″E		1342629	Upload Photo	Q26626573
49, Priory Road	II	49, Priory Road			16 November 1972	TF6112103116; 52°36′07″N 0°22′40″E		1171170	Upload Photo	Q26465004
Front Wall of Garden of Priory House	II	Priory Road			16 November 1972	TF6081103143; 52°36′08″N 0°22′23″E		1342628	Upload Photo	Q26626572
Trafalgar House	II	Priory Road			16 November 1972	TF6076803037; 52°36′05″N 0°22′21″E		1305694	Upload Photo	Q26592539
Wall and Gate Piers to Drive of Trafalgar House	II	Priory Road			16 November 1972	TF6076703111; 52°36′07″N 0°22′21″E		1077200	Upload Photo	Q26343738
1 and 3, Railway Road	II	1 and 3, Railway Road			16 November 1972	TF6074503187; 52°36′10″N 0°22′20″E		1077203	Upload Photo	Q26343748
7, Railway Road	II	7, Railway Road			16 November 1972	TF6068603163; 52°36′09″N 0°22′17″E		1342273	Upload Photo	Q26626296
9 and 11, Railway Road	II	9 and 11, Railway Road			16 November 1972	TF6065703162; 52°36′09″N 0°22′15″E		1077932	Upload Photo	Q26346158
Dial House Including Barn to North	II	12, Railway Road			16 November 1972	TF6059903206; 52°36′10″N 0°22′12″E		1171204	Upload Photo	Q26465043
35-39, 42 and 45, Railway Road	II	35-39, Railway Road			16 November 1972	TF6045303241; 52°36′12″N 0°22′04″E		1077933	Upload Photo	Q26346164
61-73, Railway Road	II	61-73, Railway Road			16 November 1972	TF6037603251; 52°36′12″N 0°22′00″E		1342274	Upload Photo	Q26626297
Station Hotel	II	75, Railway Road			16 November 1972	TF6035503255; 52°36′12″N 0°21′59″E		1305692	Upload Photo	Q26592537
77-87, Railway Road	II	77-87, Railway Road			16 November 1972	TF6033403257; 52°36′12″N 0°21′58″E		1077934	Upload Photo	Q26346167
Front Wall of Forecourt of Dial Bungalow	II	Railway Road			16 November 1972	TF6066403189; 52°36′10″N 0°22′16″E		1077201	Upload Photo	Q26343741
Front Wall of Grounds of Number 12 (dial House)	II	Railway Road			16 November 1972	TF6062303187; 52°36′10″N 0°22′13″E		1342630	Upload Photo	Q26626574
Laburnum House	II	Railway Road			16 November 1972	TF6046403272; 52°36′13″N 0°22′05″E		1077202	Upload Photo	Q26343744
Outbuilding Adjoining Number 12 (dial House on West)	II	Railway Road			16 November 1972	TF6057103201; 52°36′10″N 0°22′11″E		1171237	Upload Photo	Q26465077
Railway Station	II	Railway Road	railway station		16 November 1972	TF6030203331; 52°36′15″N 0°21′57″E		1171244	Railway Station More images	Q980263
Wall of Garden of Laburnum House	II	Railway Road			16 November 1972	TF6045103257; 52°36′12″N 0°22′04″E		1342631	Upload Photo	Q26626575
Former Headmaster's House of Downham Grammar School	II	Ryston End, PE38 9AX			16 November 1972	TF6126702914; 52°36′00″N 0°22′47″E		1077935	Upload Photo	Q26346173
Former Methodist Church and Sunday School Adjoining, South	II	South, Bridge Street			16 November 1972	TF6081803182; 52°36′09″N 0°22′24″E		1077214	Upload Photo	Q26343786
East Wall of Grounds of the Towers	II	The Howdale			16 November 1972	TF6144703122; 52°36′07″N 0°22′57″E		1342621	Upload Photo	Q26626565
Obelisk	II	The Howdale			16 November 1972	TF6168003078; 52°36′05″N 0°23′09″E		1077181	Upload Photo	Q26343675

== See also ==
- Grade I listed buildings in Norfolk
- Grade II* listed buildings in Norfolk

== Sources ==
- Wilson, Bill; Pevsner, Nikolaus (1999) [1962], Norfolk 2: North-West and South, The Buildings of England, New Haven and London: Yale University Press, ISBN 978-0-300-09657-6
