= Listed buildings in Burnham Market =

Non-Civil Parish in Norfolk, England

Burnham Market is a village and civil parish in the King's Lynn and West Norfolk district of Norfolk, England. It contains 58 listed buildings that are recorded in the National Heritage List for England. Of these one is grade I, three are grade II* and 54 are grade II.

This list is based on the information retrieved online from Historic England.

== Key ==
Grade	Criteria
I	Buildings that are of exceptional interest
II*	Particularly important buildings of more than special interest
II	Buildings that are of special interest

== Listing ==
Name	Grade	Location	Type	Completed (Note: The date given is the date used by Historic England as significant for the initial building or that of an important part in the structure's description.)	Date designated	Grid ref. (Note: The grid reference is based on the British national grid reference system, sometimes known as OSGB36, used by the Ordnance Survey.) Geo-coordinates	Notes	Entry number (Note: The "List Entry Number" is a unique number assigned to each listed building and scheduled monument by Historic England.)	Image	Wikidata
Stable Block, 50 Metres East of Burnham Westgate Hall	II	50 Metres East Of Burnham Westgate Hall			1 March 1985	TF8306042178; 52°56′45″N 0°43′23″E		1238099	Upload Photo	Q26531179
Church Close House	II	Church Walk			1 March 1985	TF8297542005; 52°56′39″N 0°43′18″E		1238198	Upload Photo	Q26531272
Church of St Mary	I	Church Walk	church building		5 June 1953	TF8302242092; 52°56′42″N 0°43′21″E		1238100	Church of St Mary More images	Q17536492
Crabbe Hall Farmhouse	II	Creake Road			5 June 1953	TF8358442084; 52°56′41″N 0°43′51″E		1274266	Upload Photo	Q26563945
High House	II	1 and 2, Front Street			1 March 1985	TF8338142183; 52°56′44″N 0°43′40″E		1274231	Upload Photo	Q26563911
Ivy House, Wittons, Winearls and No. 19	II	19, Front Street			1 March 1985	TF8335242159; 52°56′44″N 0°43′39″E		1238274	Upload Photo	Q26531340
Arch House	II	Front Street			1 March 1985	TF8349942200; 52°56′45″N 0°43′47″E		1238424	Upload Photo	Q26531486
Cottage Attached to Pair of Cottages to East of Mostyn	II	Front Street			1 March 1985	TF8346942191; 52°56′45″N 0°43′45″E		1238402	Upload Photo	Q26531463
Cottages Attached to West of Archway House	II	Front Street			1 March 1985	TF8349142198; 52°56′45″N 0°43′46″E		1238339	Upload Photo	Q26531403
Estcourt House	II	Front Street			5 June 1953	TF8333442153; 52°56′44″N 0°43′38″E		1238637	Upload Photo	Q26531684
Haberdasher	II	Front Street			1 March 1985	TF8343642180; 52°56′44″N 0°43′43″E		1238104	Upload Photo	Q26531183
Honeysuckle Cottage	II	Front Street			1 March 1985	TF8342442177; 52°56′44″N 0°43′43″E		1238327	Upload Photo	Q26531390
House Attached to West of No 2 High House	II	Front Street			1 March 1985	TF8336642180; 52°56′44″N 0°43′39″E		1238342	Upload Photo	Q26531406
Mostyn	II	Front Street			1 March 1985	TF8345142186; 52°56′44″N 0°43′44″E		1238334	Upload Photo	Q26531398
Old Tiles and Bowling House	II	Front Street			1 March 1985	TF8337042163; 52°56′44″N 0°43′40″E		1238101	Upload Photo	Q26531180
Pair of Cottages Attached to the East of Mostyn	II	Front Street			1 March 1985	TF8345942188; 52°56′45″N 0°43′44″E		1238336	Upload Photo	Q26531400
Sunnyside	II	Front Street			1 March 1985	TF8344442184; 52°56′44″N 0°43′44″E		1238330	Upload Photo	Q26531393
The Old Crabbe Hall, Hamilton Cottage and the Garden House	II	Hamilton Cottage And The Garden House, Front Street			1 March 1985	TF8340442168; 52°56′44″N 0°43′41″E		1238102	Upload Photo	Q26531181
Icehouse, 50 Metres South East of Burnham Hall Farmhouse	II	50 Metres South East Of Burnham Hall Farmhouse, Herring's Lane			1 March 1985	TF8312942377; 52°56′51″N 0°43′27″E		1238454	Upload Photo	Q26531514
Market House and Market House Cottage	II*	Herrings Lane	house		5 June 1953	TF8321242189; 52°56′45″N 0°43′31″E		1238590	Market House and Market House Cottage More images	Q17555352
Ivy Cottage and Goose Bec	II	4, Market Place			4 August 1975	TF8307542153; 52°56′44″N 0°43′24″E		1274150	Upload Photo	Q26563836
Redwins	II	5, Market Place			4 August 1975	TF8309142153; 52°56′44″N 0°43′25″E		1274233	Upload Photo	Q26563913
Tweed Cottage	II	9, Market Place			4 August 1975	TF8310142148; 52°56′44″N 0°43′25″E		1274134	Upload Photo	Q26563820
Clare Cottage and Lion House	II	11, Market Place			5 June 1953	TF8311342150; 52°56′44″N 0°43′26″E		1238345	Upload Photo	Q26531409
Hoste Arms Public House	II	14, Market Place	pub		5 June 1953	TF8313742156; 52°56′44″N 0°43′27″E		1274234	Hoste Arms Public House More images	Q26563914
15, Market Place	II	15, Market Place			9 March 1994	TF8315942160; 52°56′44″N 0°43′28″E		1263759	Upload Photo	Q26554529
16, Market Place	II	16, Market Place			4 August 1975	TF8316842164; 52°56′44″N 0°43′29″E		1274140	Upload Photo	Q26563826
The Aviaries and Crown Cottage	II	22 and 23, Market Place			4 August 1975	TF8319942173; 52°56′44″N 0°43′31″E		1238589	Upload Photo	Q26531640
25 and 26, Market Place	II	25 and 26, Market Place			5 June 1953	TF8323542175; 52°56′44″N 0°43′32″E		1238594	Upload Photo	Q26531644
28, Market Place	II	28, Market Place			5 June 1953	TF8324342175; 52°56′44″N 0°43′33″E		1274088	Upload Photo	Q26563781
29-34, Market Place	II	29-34, Market Place			5 June 1953	TF8325942180; 52°56′45″N 0°43′34″E		1238596	Upload Photo	Q26531646
Old Barclays Bank Building	II	50, Market Place			1 March 1985	TF8332142192; 52°56′45″N 0°43′37″E		1238636	Upload Photo	Q26531683
Hammonds House	II	51, Market Place			4 August 1975	TF8332842176; 52°56′44″N 0°43′37″E		1274113	Upload Photo	Q26563802
Briar Cottage and Fern Cottage	II	53 and 54, Market Place			1 March 1985	TF8332142153; 52°56′44″N 0°43′37″E		1238639	Upload Photo	Q26531686
55, Market Place	II	55, Market Place			1 March 1985	TF8331242151; 52°56′44″N 0°43′37″E		1274114	Upload Photo	Q26563803
59, 60 and 61, Market Place	II	59, 60 and 61, Market Place			5 June 1953	TF8328642142; 52°56′43″N 0°43′35″E		1238681	Upload Photo	Q26531726
The White House and No. 63 Market Place	II	63, Market Place			5 June 1953	TF8327242138; 52°56′43″N 0°43′34″E		1238684	Upload Photo	Q26531729
Craig House	II	65, Market Place			5 June 1953	TF8326442131; 52°56′43″N 0°43′34″E		1238686	Upload Photo	Q26531731
Sands House and the Pharmacy	II	66, Market Place			5 June 1953	TF8325242129; 52°56′43″N 0°43′33″E		1274073	Upload Photo	Q26563766
Nos. 70 and 71 (the Vine House)	II	70, Market Place			5 June 1953	TF8323142122; 52°56′43″N 0°43′32″E		1238688	Upload Photo	Q26531733
Beeston House and Grooms Bakery	II	72, Market Place			5 June 1953	TF8321642120; 52°56′43″N 0°43′31″E		1238689	Upload Photo	Q26531734
Pentney House	II	76, Market Place			5 June 1953	TF8320142116; 52°56′43″N 0°43′31″E		1238845	Upload Photo	Q26531882
Burnham Cottage	II	85, Market Place			5 June 1953	TF8314842106; 52°56′42″N 0°43′28″E		1238849	Upload Photo	Q26531886
Burnham House	II	86, Market Place			5 June 1953	TF8313742103; 52°56′42″N 0°43′27″E		1238691	Upload Photo	Q26531735
Westgate House	II	90, Market Place			5 June 1953	TF8309442088; 52°56′42″N 0°43′25″E		1273968	Upload Photo	Q26563664
Burnham Westgate Hall	II*	Market Place	retirement home		5 June 1953	TF8299842175; 52°56′45″N 0°43′20″E		1274350	Burnham Westgate Hall More images	Q40109929
Burnham Market War Memorial	II	Marketplace, PE31 8HD	war memorial		29 January 2018	TF8324242144; 52°56′43″N 0°43′33″E		1453021	Burnham Market War Memorial More images	Q66479362
Cobham House	II	North Street			1 March 1985	TF8355642304; 52°56′48″N 0°43′50″E		1274232	Upload Photo	Q26563912
Foundry House and Satchell's Off Licence	II	North Street			1 March 1985	TF8335242234; 52°56′46″N 0°43′39″E		1238343	Upload Photo	Q26531407
National Westminster Bank	II	North Street			1 March 1985	TF8336542216; 52°56′46″N 0°43′40″E		1238344	Upload Photo	Q26531408
Northfields and Northgate House	II	North Street			1 March 1985	TF8337542223; 52°56′46″N 0°43′40″E		1274173	Upload Photo	Q26563858
Wall Attached to East of Satchell's Off Licence	II	North Street			1 March 1985	TF8336442230; 52°56′46″N 0°43′39″E		1238466	Upload Photo	Q26531525
Church House Stylman Brothers	II	Overy Road			5 June 1953	TF8363542292; 52°56′48″N 0°43′54″E		1238957	Upload Photo	Q26531985
Old Rectory	II	Overy Road			1 March 1985	TF8372242298; 52°56′48″N 0°43′59″E		1238875	Upload Photo	Q26531912
St Andrew's Ulph Drapers	II	Overy Road			1 March 1985	TF8369242300; 52°56′48″N 0°43′57″E		1238874	Upload Photo	Q26531911
K6 Telephone Kiosk	II	The Green			26 November 1993	TF8318542148; 52°56′44″N 0°43′30″E		1263758	Upload Photo	Q26554528
The Blue House, the House on the Green and Coachman's Cottage	II	The House On The Green And Coachman's Cottage, 78, 79 and 80, Market Place			5 June 1953	TF8316642110; 52°56′42″N 0°43′29″E		1274076	Upload Photo	Q26563769
Church of All Saints	II*	Ulph Place, Burnham Ulph	church building		5 June 1953	TF8355042251; 52°56′46″N 0°43′49″E		1238876	Church of All Saints More images	Q17555358

== See also ==
- Grade I listed buildings in Norfolk
- Grade II* listed buildings in Norfolk

== Sources ==
- Wilson, Bill; Pevsner, Nikolaus (1999) [1962], Norfolk 2: North-West and South, The Buildings of England, New Haven and London: Yale University Press, ISBN 978-0-300-09657-6
