= Tottenhill =

Civil parish in Norfolk, England

Coordinates: 52.670137°N 0.426407°E

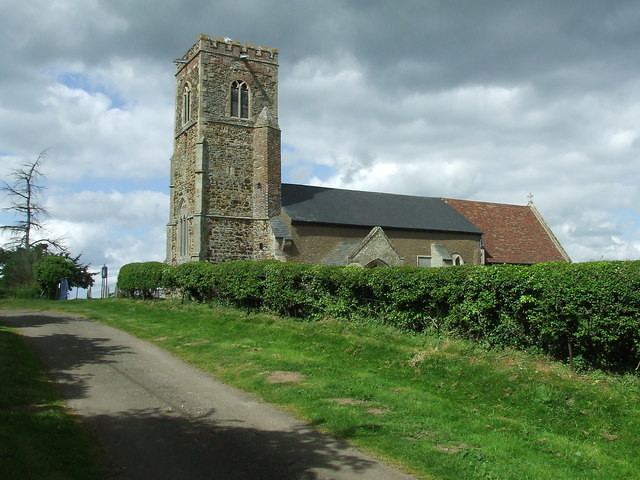
- St Botolph's Church, Tottenhill

- Location within Norfolk
- Area: 5.90 km^{2} (2.28 sq mi)
- Population: 219 (2011)
  - Density: 37/km^{2} (96/sq mi)
- OS grid reference: TF641108
- Civil parish: Tottenhill
- District: King's Lynn and West Norfolk
- Shire county: Norfolk
- Region: East
- Country: England
- Sovereign state: United Kingdom
- Post town: KING'S LYNN
- Postcode district: PE33
- Dialling code: 01553
- Police: Norfolk
- Fire: Norfolk
- Ambulance: East of England

Tottenhill is a civil parish in the English county of Norfolk. It covers an area of 5.90 km^{2} (2.28 sq mi) and had a population of 231 in 97 households at the 2001 census, which decreased to 219 by the 2011 Census. For the purposes of local government, it falls within the district of King's Lynn and West Norfolk.

The villages name means 'Totta's hill'.
