= 2023 King's Lynn and West Norfolk Borough Council election =

Election

- 4 May 2023

All 55 seats to King's Lynn and West Norfolk Borough Council 28 seats needed for a majority
	First party	Second party	Third party
Leader	Stuart Dark	Terry Parish	Charles Joyce
Party	Conservative	Independent	Labour
Last election	28 seats, 48.2%	15 seats, 26.4%	10 seats, 16.7%
Seats before	29	11	9
Seats won	21	18	11
Seat change	▼7	▲3	▲1
Popular vote	20,449	14,687	9,172
Percentage	40.8%	29.3%	18.3%
Swing	▼6.7%	▲2.5%	▲1.2%
	Fourth party	Fifth party
Party	Liberal Democrats	Green
Last election	1 seat, 2.0%	1 seat, 4.0%
Seats before	2	1
Seats won	3	2
Seat change	▲2	▲1
Popular vote	3,014	2,536
Percentage	6.0%	5.1%
Swing	▲4.0%	▲1.2%
- Winner of each seat at the 2023 King's Lynn and West Norfolk Borough Council election
Leader before election
Stuart Dark
Conservative
Leader after election
Terry Parish
Independent
No overall control (Note: Independent–Liberal Democrats–Green minority coalition with Labour support.)

The 2023 King's Lynn and West Norfolk Borough Council election took place on 4 May 2023 to elect members of King's Lynn and West Norfolk Borough Council in Norfolk, England. This was on the same day as other local elections in England.

Prior to the election the council was under Conservative majority control. Following the election the Conservatives remained the largest party but lost their majority, leaving the council under no overall control. A coalition of the independent councillors, Liberal Democrats and Greens formed a minority administration with informal support from Labour, with independent councillor Terry Parish being appointed leader of the council at the subsequent annual council meeting on 18 May 2023. A few days after the elections, unseated councillor and former mayor David Whitby passed away.

== Summary ==
=== Election result ===
2023 King's Lynn and West Norfolk Borough Council election
Party	Candidates	Seats	Gains	Losses	Net gain/loss	Seats %	Votes %	Votes	+/−
Conservative	49	21	3	10	▼7	37.0	40.8	20,449	–6.7
Independent	35	18	6	3	▲3	33.3	29.3	14,687	+2.5
Labour	29	11	2	1	▲1	20.4	18.3	9,172	+1.2
Liberal Democrats	7	3	2	0	▲2	5.6	6.0	3,014	+4.0
Green	7	2	1	0	▲1	3.7	5.1	2,536	+1.2
Monster Raving Loony	1	0	0	0	Steady	0.0	0.4	188	N/A
Heritage	1	0	0	0	Steady	0.0	0.2	98	N/A

== Ward results ==
The Statement of Persons Nominated, which details the candidates standing in each ward, was released by South Norfolk District Council following the close of nominations on 5 April 2023. The results for each ward were as follows, with an asterisk (*) indicating an incumbent councillor standing for re-election:

=== Airfield ===
Airfield (2 seats)
Party	Candidate	Votes	%	±%
Independent	James Moriarty*	784	61.8	
Green	Pallavi Devulapalli	455	35.9	
Conservative	Graham Philpot	357	28.1	
Independent	Michael Howland*	326	25.7	
Turnout		1,269	29.5	
Registered electors		4,308		
Independent hold				
Green gain from Conservative				

=== Bircham with Rudhams ===
Bircham with Rudhams
Party	Candidate	Votes	%	±%
Independent	Christopher Morley*	504	62.2	
Conservative	Michael Chenery of Horsbrugh	306	37.8	
Majority		198	24.4	
Turnout		810	37.0	
Registered electors		2,206		
Independent hold		Swing		

=== Brancaster ===
Brancaster
Party	Candidate	Votes	%	±%
Conservative	Nicholas Parry de Winton	421	56.9	
Independent	Robert Lawton*	319	43.1	
Majority		102	13.8	
Turnout		740	38.2	
Registered electors		1,973		
Conservative gain from Independent		Swing		

=== Burnham Market & Docking ===
Burnham Market & Docking
Party	Candidate	Votes	%	±%
Conservative	Samantha Sandell*	518	67.3	
Labour	Kenneth Hubbard	252	32.7	
Majority		266	34.6	
Turnout		770	37.8	
Registered electors		2,057		
Conservative hold		Swing		

=== Clenchwarton ===
Clenchwarton
Party	Candidate	Votes	%	±%
Independent	Steven Bearshaw	443	64.0	
Conservative	David Whitby*	249	36.0	
Majority		194	28.0	
Turnout		692	29.8	
Registered electors		2,326		
Independent gain from Conservative		Swing		

=== Denver ===
Denver
Party	Candidate	Votes	%	±%
Conservative	Peter Hodson	311	51.5	
Liberal Democrats	Alan Holmes*	293	48.5	
Majority		18	3.0	
Turnout		604	31.3	
Registered electors		1,957		
Conservative gain from Independent		Swing		

=== Dersingham ===
Dersingham (2 seats)
Party	Candidate	Votes	%	±%
Conservative	Judith Collingham*	828	47.8	
Conservative	Tony Bubb*	813	46.9	
Green	Jordan Stokes	511	29.5	
Labour	Richard Pennington	456	26.3	
Independent	John Houston	437	25.2	
Turnout		1,732	34.9	
Registered electors		4,966		
Conservative hold				
Conservative hold				

=== Downham Old Town ===
Downham Old Town
Party	Candidate	Votes	%	±%
Labour	Joshua Osborne	301	46.3	
Conservative	Barry Hobbs	194	29.8	
Independent	Zara Hipsey	155	23.8	
Majority		107	16.5	
Turnout		650	28.5	
Registered electors		2,284		
Labour gain from Conservative		Swing		

=== East Downham ===
East Downham
Party	Candidate	Votes	%	±%
Liberal Democrats	Josie Ratcliffe*	310	66.2	
Conservative	Anthony White	158	33.8	
Majority		152	32.4	
Turnout		468	23.0	
Registered electors		2,049		
Liberal Democrats hold		Swing		

=== Emneth & Outwell ===
Emneth & Outwell (2 seats)
Party	Candidate	Votes	%	±%
Conservative	Christopher Crofts*	517	56.0	
Conservative	Harry Humphrey*	437	47.3	
Independent	Yvonne Howard	417	45.2	
Monster Raving Loony	Ashley Inwood	188	20.4	
Turnout		923	22.9	
Registered electors		4,031		
Conservative hold				
Conservative hold				

=== Fairstead ===
Fairstead (2 seats)
Party	Candidate	Votes	%	±%
Labour	Margaret Wilkinson*	368	50.8	
Labour	Steve Everett	330	45.5	
Conservative	Andrew Wilson	262	36.1	
Green	Joel Blackmur	175	24.1	
Turnout		725	16.8	
Registered electors		4,308		
Labour hold				
Labour hold				

=== Feltwell ===
Feltwell (2 seats)
Party	Candidate	Votes	%	±%
Conservative	Martin Storey*	550	50.7	
Conservative	Adrian Lawrence*	447	41.2	
Independent	Terence Hipsey	373	34.4	
Labour	Phil Davies	302	27.9	
Heritage	Gary Conway	98	9.0	
Turnout		1,084	26.5	
Registered electors		4,085		
Conservative hold				
Conservative hold				

=== Gayton & Grimston ===
Gayton & Grimston (2 seats)
Party	Candidate	Votes	%	±%
Green	Andrew de Whalley*	732	50.6	
Independent	Baljinder Anota	681	47.1	
Conservative	Susan Fraser	548	37.9	
Turnout		1,447	30.1	
Registered electors		4,809		
Green hold				
Independent gain from Conservative				

=== Gaywood Chase ===
Gaywood Chase
Party	Candidate	Votes	%	±%
Labour	Joshua Lowe	227	47.2	
Independent	Richard Morrish	134	27.9	
Conservative	Liam Hind	120	24.9	
Majority		93	19.3	
Turnout		481	25.0	
Registered electors		1,934		
Labour hold		Swing		

=== Gaywood Clock ===
Gaywood Clock
Party	Candidate	Votes	%	±%
Labour	Alexandra Ware	263	69.0	
Conservative	Michael Roberts	118	31.0	
Majority		145	38.0	
Turnout		381	17.5	
Registered electors		2,212		
Labour hold		Swing		

=== Gaywood North Bank ===
Gaywood North Bank (3 seats)
Party	Candidate	Votes	%	±%
Liberal Democrats	Robert Colwell	685	44.7	
Liberal Democrats	David Sayers	543	35.4	
Labour	Sandra Collop*	504	32.9	
Liberal Democrats	John Crofts	492	32.1	
Conservative	Michael Baldwin	429	28.0	
Labour	Helen Dalgliesh	428	27.9	
Labour	Wilfred Lambert	404	26.3	
Conservative	Philip Trask	384	25.0	
Green	Vicky Fairweather	207	13.5	
Turnout		1,534	23.7	
Registered electors		6,470		
Liberal Democrats gain from Conservative				
Liberal Democrats gain from Conservative				
Labour hold				

=== Heacham ===
Heacham (2 seats)
Party	Candidate	Votes	%	±%
Independent	Terence Parish*	1,006	67.6	
Conservative	Andrew Jamieson	494	33.2	
Labour	Michelle Carter	463	31.1	
Conservative	Michael Jackson	393	26.4	
Turnout		1,487	34.5	
Registered electors		4,317		
Independent hold				
Conservative hold				

=== Hunstanton ===
Hunstanton (2 seats)
Party	Candidate	Votes	%	±%
Conservative	Angela Dickinson	609	41.8	
Independent	Robert Beal*	522	35.9	
Conservative	Howard Johnston	510	35.0	
Independent	David Nice	436	29.9	
Labour	Mark Fuchter	361	24.8	
Labour	Edward Robb	256	17.6	
Turnout		1,456	39.0	
Registered electors		3,731		
Conservative hold				
Independent hold				

=== Massingham with Castle Acre ===
Massingham with Castle Acre
Party	Candidate	Votes	%	±%
Independent	Alistair Beales	569	64.9	
Conservative	Timothy Tilbrook	308	35.1	
Majority		261	29.8	
Turnout		877	37.3	
Registered electors		2,377		
Independent hold		Swing		

=== Methwold ===
Methwold
Party	Candidate	Votes	%	±%
Independent	Alun Ryves*	370	62.6	
Conservative	Mick Peake	221	37.4	
Majority		149	25.2	
Turnout		591	26.7	
Registered electors		2,233		
Independent hold		Swing		

=== North Downham ===
North Downham
Party	Candidate	Votes	%	±%
Independent	Mark Bullen	207	31.0	
Conservative	Matthew Sawyer	176	26.3	
Independent	Barrie Wiles	166	24.9	
Labour	Eamonn McCusker	119	17.8	
Majority		31	4.7	
Turnout		668	30.5	
Registered electors		2,197		
Independent hold		Swing		

=== North Lynn ===
North Lynn (2 seats)
Party	Candidate	Votes	%	±%
Labour	Benjamin Jones*	355	66.9	
Labour	Micaela Bartrum	329	62.0	
Conservative	William Cox	155	29.2	
Turnout		531	12.4	
Registered electors		4,294		
Labour hold				
Labour hold				

=== Snettisham ===
Snettisham
Party	Candidate	Votes	%	±%
Conservative	Stuart Dark	413	51.7	
Independent	Avril Wright	241	30.2	
Labour	Lesley Marriage	145	18.1	
Majority		172	21.5	
Turnout		799	36.1	
Registered electors		2,215		
Conservative hold		Swing		

=== South & West Lynn ===
South & West Lynn (2 seats)
Party	Candidate	Votes	%	±%
Independent	Alexandra Kampourpopoulos*	481	66.0	
Labour	Charles Joyce*	357	49.0	
Labour	John Wheatley	161	22.1	
Conservative	Rosalie Costin	124	17.0	
Conservative	David Costin	121	16.6	
Turnout		729	20.7	
Registered electors		3,526		
Independent hold				
Labour hold				

=== South Downham ===
South Downham
Party	Candidate	Votes	%	±%
Conservative	Donald Tyler*	278	37.2	
Independent	Stephen Moyses	195	26.1	
Liberal Democrats	Olive Heath	166	22.2	
Labour	Heather Fouracre	109	14.6	
Majority		83	11.1	
Turnout		748	37.2	
Registered electors		2,023		
Conservative hold		Swing		

=== Springwood ===
Springwood
Party	Candidate	Votes	%	±%
Independent	JoAnne Rust*	330	48.5	
Conservative	Richard Parr	196	28.8	
Labour	Richard Johnson	155	22.8	
Majority		134	19.7	
Turnout		681	32.8	
Registered electors		2,093		
Independent gain from Labour		Swing		

=== Terrington ===
Terrington (2 seats)
Party	Candidate	Votes	%	±%
Conservative	Paul Kunes*	591	51.3	
Independent	Sandra Squire*	515	44.7	
Conservative	Remi Clark	439	38.1	
Labour	Matthew Hannay	350	30.4	
Turnout		1,153	24.5	
Registered electors		4,709		
Conservative hold				
Independent hold				

=== Tilney, Mershe Lande & Wiggenhall ===
Tilney, Mershe Lande & Wiggenhall (2 seats)
Party	Candidate	Votes	%	±%
Conservative	Barry Ayres	524	49.9	
Conservative	Brian Long	517	49.2	
Independent	Ashley Collins	400	38.1	
Labour	Niall Haigh	357	34.0	
Turnout		1,051	25.4	
Registered electors		4,132		
Conservative hold				
Conservative hold				

=== Upwell & Delph ===
Upwell & Delph (2 seats)
Party	Candidate	Votes	%	±%
Conservative	Vivienne Spikings	614	46.5	
Independent	Colin Rose	561	42.5	
Liberal Democrats	Graham Dent	525	39.8	
Conservative	Georgina Wise	507	38.4	
Turnout		1,320	26.2	
Registered electors		5,035		
Conservative gain from Independent				
Independent hold				

=== Walsoken, West Walton & Walpole ===
Walsoken, West Walton & Walpole (2 seats)
Party	Candidate	Votes	%	±%
Conservative	Julian Kirk*	706	58.3	
Conservative	Richard Blunt*	659	54.5	
Independent	James Whitaker	425	35.1	
Labour	Simon Pick	277	22.9	
Turnout		1,210	25.2	
Registered electors		4,803		
Conservative hold				
Conservative hold				

=== Watlington ===
Watlington
Party	Candidate	Votes	%	±%
Independent	Jim Bhondi*	Unopposed		
Turnout		0	0.0	
Independent hold				

=== West Winch ===
West Winch (2 seats)
Party	Candidate	Votes	%	±%
Conservative	Thomas Barclay	422	34.6	
Independent	Simon Nash*	407	33.4	
Independent	Benjamin Lemmon	390	32.0	
Conservative	Olivia Morris	370	30.4	
Independent	Peter Gidney*	320	26.3	
Labour	Christopher Heneghan	238	19.5	
Turnout		1,218	30.5	
Registered electors		3,992		
Conservative hold				
Independent hold				

=== Wissey ===
Wissey
Party	Candidate	Votes	%	±%
Independent	Susanne Lintern	465	63.3	
Conservative	Colin Sampson*	270	36.7	
Majority		195	26.6	
Turnout		735	33.7	
Registered electors		2,193		
Independent gain from Conservative		Swing		

=== St Margaret's with St Nicholas ===
St Margaret's with St Nicholas (2 seats)
Party	Candidate	Votes	%	±%
Labour	Francis Bone*	373	41.0	
Labour	Deborah Heneghan	299	32.8	
Green	Robert Archer	250	27.4	
Conservative	Joshua Maddocks	225	24.7	
Conservative	Anthony Wright	211	23.2	
Green	Claire Archer	206	22.6	
Independent	Andrew Williams	116	12.7	
Turnout		911	23.8	
Registered electors		3,822		
Labour hold				
Labour gain from Conservative				

=== The Woottons ===
The Woottons (3 seats)
Party	Candidate	Votes	%	±%
Independent	Paul Bland	1,039	49.7	
Independent	Simon Ring	953	45.6	
Conservative	Richard Coates	842	40.3	
Conservative	Graham Middleton*	806	38.6	
Conservative	Greville Howard*	781	37.4	
Labour	Peter Smith	633	30.3	
Turnout		2,091	38.1	
Registered electors		5,494		
Independent gain from Conservative				
Independent gain from Conservative				
Conservative hold				

== By-elections ==
=== North Lynn ===
North Lynn by-election: 5 June 2025
Party	Candidate	Votes	%	±%
Reform	Austen Moore	278	49.6	N/A
Liberal Democrats	Geri Sayers	123	21.9	N/A
Labour	Wilfred Lambert	107	19.1	–50.5
Green	Rob Archer	52	9.3	N/A
Majority		155	27.7	N/A
Turnout		560	13.2	+0.8
Registered electors		4,343		
Reform gain from Labour				

=== Fairstead ===
Fairstead by-election: 5 June 2025
Party	Candidate	Votes	%	±%
Reform	Jacqueline Fry	289	39.1	N/A
Liberal Democrats	Crystal Colwell	275	37.2	N/A
Labour	Michelle Carter	118	16.0	–29.7
Green	Ian Milburn	36	4.9	–16.8
Independent	Benjamin Lemmon	21	2.8	N/A
Majority		14	2.1	N/A
Turnout		739	17.4	+0.6
Registered electors		4,242		
Reform gain from Labour				

=== Hunstanton ===
Hunstanton by-election: 27 November 2025
Party	Candidate	Votes	%	±%
Reform	Fred Pidcock	368	29.1	N/A
Liberal Democrats	Tammy Edmunds	322	25.5	N/A
Independent	Howard Johnston	229	18.1	N/A
Conservative	Ade Adeyemo	224	17.7	–23.0
Independent	David Nice	77	6.1	N/A
Labour	Christopher Heneghan	40	3.2	–21.0
Majority		46	3.6	N/A
Turnout		1,260	33.0	–6.0
Registered electors		3,835		
Reform gain from Independent				

=== Heacham ===
Heacham by-election: 6 August 2026 Resignation of Andrew Jamieson (Conservative)
Party	Candidate	Votes	%	±%
Reform	Paul Powers	289	37.8	N/A
Liberal Democrats	Rachael Windsor	219	28.7	N/A
Conservative	Ade Adeyemo	163	21.3	−3.8
Labour	Ken Hubbard	93	12.2	−11.4
Majority		70	9.1	N/A
Turnout		764	17.7	−18.4
Registered electors		4,316		
Reform gain from Conservative				

=== Snettisham ===
Snettisham by-election: 6 August 2026 Resignation of Stuart Dark (Conservative)
Party	Candidate	Votes	%	±%
Reform	Ben Griffin	229	35.1	N/A
Liberal Democrats	Lee Henson	211	32.3	N/A
Conservative	Lissie Macfarlane	169	25.9	−25.8
Labour	Wilf Lambert	44	6.7	−11.4
Majority		18	2.8	N/A
Turnout		653	29.6	−6.5
Registered electors		2,206		
Reform gain from Conservative				
