= West Winch =

Village in Norfolk, England

Coordinates: 52.71261°N 0.41152°E

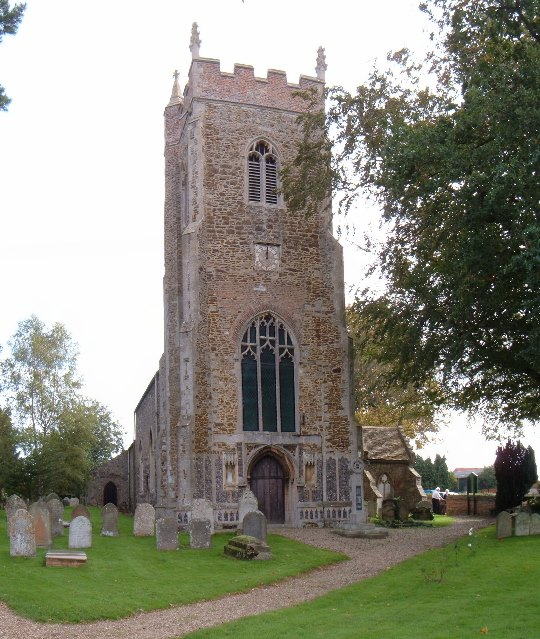
- St Mary's Church, West Winch

- Location within Norfolk
- Area: 8.02 km^{2} (3.10 sq mi)
- Population: 2,734 (2011)
  - Density: 341/km^{2} (880/sq mi)
- OS grid reference: TF630155
- Civil parish: West Winch
- District: King's Lynn and West Norfolk
- Shire county: Norfolk
- Region: East
- Country: England
- Sovereign state: United Kingdom
- Post town: KING'S LYNN
- Postcode district: PE33
- Police: Norfolk
- Fire: Norfolk
- Ambulance: East of England

West Winch is a village and civil parish in the English county of Norfolk. It covers an area of 8.02 km^{2} (3.10 sq mi) and had a population of 2,596 in 1,068 households at the 2001 census, the population increasing to 2,734 at the 2011 census. For the purposes of local government, it falls within the district of King's Lynn and West Norfolk.

The village's name means 'pasture (specialised) farm'. 'West' to distinguish from East Winch.

West Winch is situated on the A10 several miles south of the town of King's Lynn. The most celebrated feature is a windmill (at grid reference TF63131678) that was restored from dereliction between 1973 and 1980 and is now complete with sails. Cartoonist Osbert Lancaster is buried in the church graveyard, having previously opened the William Burt Social Club in 1974. A plaque on the club's wall commemorates this event. A range of recycling facilities are adjacent to the club. West Winch Primary School received a 'good' rating from Ofsted in 2014.

== Governance ==
An electoral ward in the same name exists. The population of this ward at the 2011 Census was 4,734.
