= Walpole Highway =

Village in Norfolk, England

Coordinates: 52.70122°N 0.24159°E

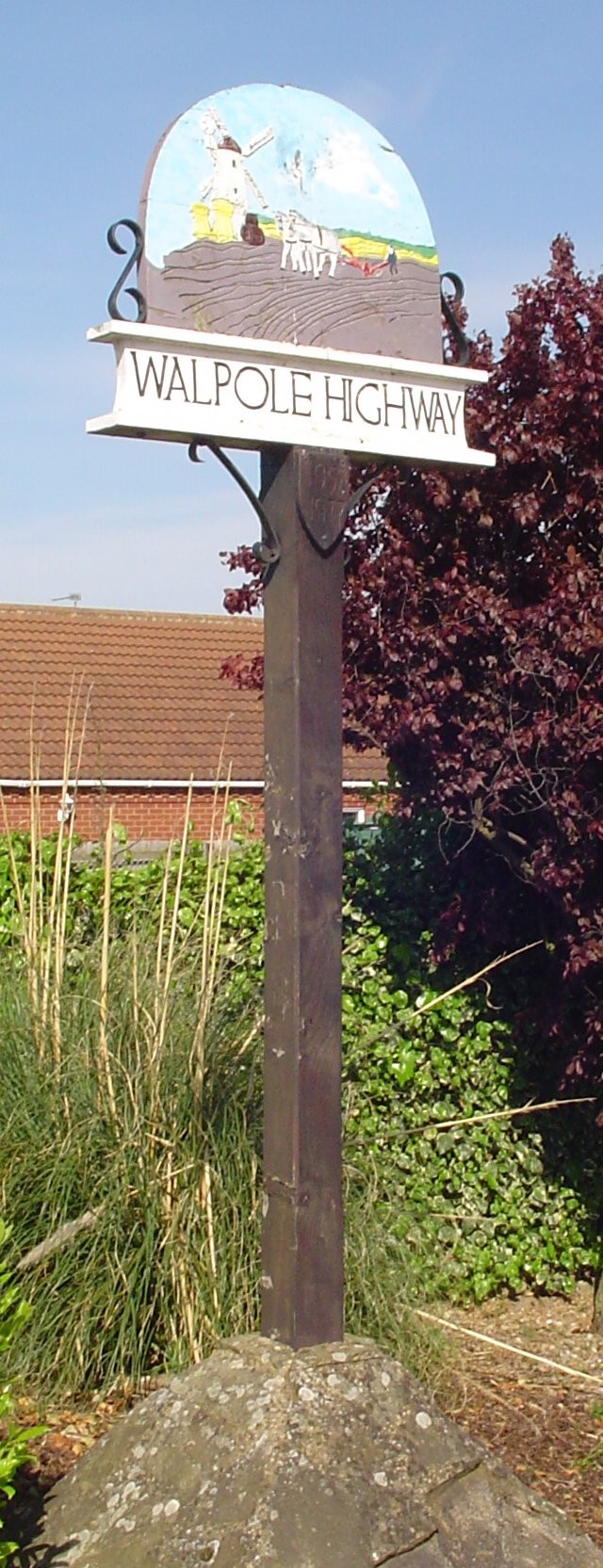
- Signpost in Walpole Highway

- Location within Norfolk
- Area: 10.48 km^{2} (4.05 sq mi)
- Population: 701 (2011)
  - Density: 67/km^{2} (170/sq mi)
- OS grid reference: TF515138
- District: King's Lynn and West Norfolk
- Shire county: Norfolk
- Region: East
- Country: England
- Sovereign state: United Kingdom
- Post town: WISBECH
- Postcode district: PE14
- Dialling code: 01945
- Police: Norfolk
- Fire: Norfolk
- Ambulance: East of England

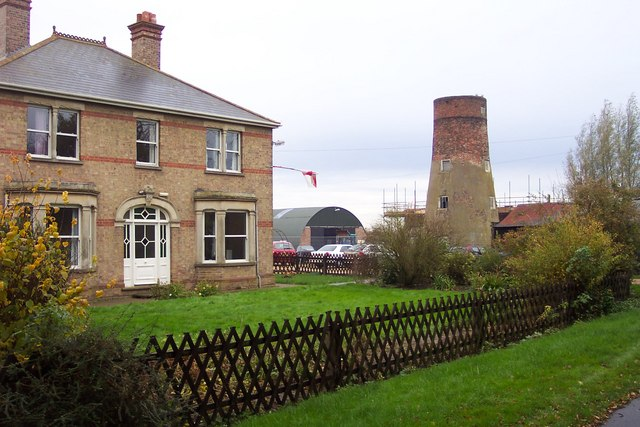
Mill House and remains of the windmill at Ratten Row

Walpole Highway is a village and civil parish in the English county of Norfolk. It covers an area of 10.48 km^{2} (4.05 sq mi) and had a population of 685 in 266 households at the 2001 census, the population increasing to 701 at the 2011 census. For the purposes of local government, it falls within the district of King's Lynn and West Norfolk.

The village lies to the south of the route of the A47 between Peterborough and King's Lynn.

== History ==
A Village school was erected in 1879.

St. Edmund was built in the 1840s as a chapel of ease to the massive mother church at Walpole St Peter. It has since been sold and turned into a private residence

== Notable people ==
- James W Taylor (b1912), author and poet.
