= King's Lynn and West Norfolk =

Coordinates: 52.7549°N 0.3962°E

Borough of King's Lynn and West Norfolk
- Borough and non-metropolitan district
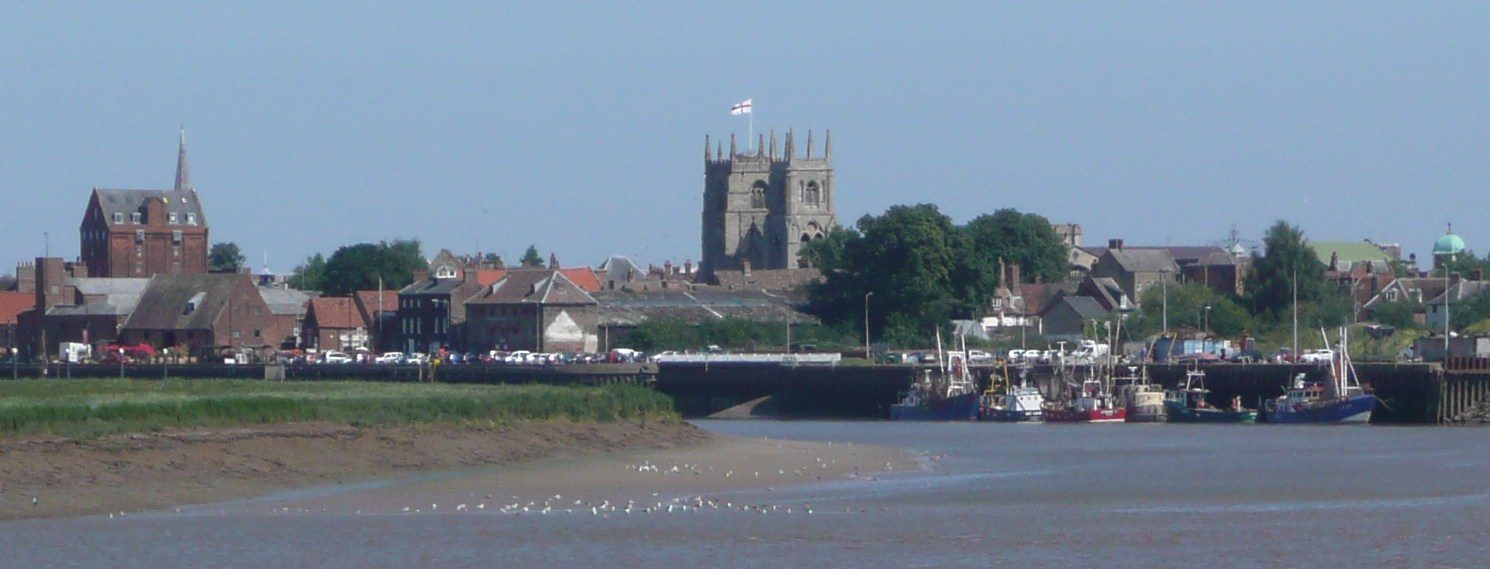
- King's Lynn, known for both King's Lynn Minster and a statue to George Vancouver. The town is the administrative centre and largest settlement in the borough.

- Shown within Norfolk
- Sovereign state: United Kingdom
- Constituent country: England
- Region: East of England
- Administrative county: Norfolk
- Admin. HQ: King's Lynn

Government
  - Type: Borough Council

Area
  - Total: 560 sq mi (1,440 km^{2})
  - Rank: 15th

Population (2025)
  - Total: 156,943
  - Rank: Ranked 146th
  - Density: 282/sq mi (109/km^{2})

Ethnicity (2021)
  - Ethnic groups: List: 95.6% White; 1.9% Asian; 1.3% Mixed; 0.7% other; 0.5% Black

Religion (2021)
  - Religion: List: 52.4% Christianity; 39.5% no religion; 7.6% other; 0.5% Islam
- Time zone: UTC+0 (Greenwich Mean Time)
  - Summer (DST): UTC+1 (British Summer Time)
- ONS code: 33UE (ONS); E07000146 (GSS)

King's Lynn and West Norfolk is a local government district with borough status in Norfolk, England. Its council is based in the town of King's Lynn. The district also includes the towns of Downham Market and Hunstanton, along with numerous villages and surrounding rural areas. The population of the district at the 2021 census was 154,325.

Part of the borough lies within the Norfolk Coast Area of Outstanding Natural Beauty. The borough lies on the coast, facing both The Wash to the west and the North Sea to the north. The neighbouring districts are North Norfolk, Breckland, West Suffolk, East Cambridgeshire, Fenland and South Holland.

== History ==
The district was created on 1 April 1974 under the Local Government Act 1972, covering seven former districts which were all abolished at the same time:

- Docking Rural District
- Downham Market Urban District
- Downham Rural District
- Freebridge Lynn Rural District
- Hunstanton Urban District
- King's Lynn Municipal Borough
- Marshland Rural District

The new district was initially named "West Norfolk" reflecting its position in the wider county. The district was awarded borough status on 30 January 1981, allowing the chair of the council to take the title of mayor. The name of the borough was changed later that year, becoming "King's Lynn and West Norfolk" with effect from 14 May 1981.

In March 2026, the government announced plans to abolish the district in 2028 as part of local government reorganisation across Norfolk. These proposals were withdrawn in September 2026.

== Governance ==
Borough Council of King's Lynn and West Norfolk

Type
- Type: Non-metropolitan district

Leadership
- Mayor: Steven Bearshaw, Independent since 14 May 2026
- Leader: Alistair Beales, Independent since 16 May 2024
- Chief Executive: Kate Blakemore since 17 June 2024

Structure
- Seats: 55 councillors
- Political groups: Administration (20) Independent Partnership (17) Liberal Democrats (UK) (2) Your Party (1) Other parties (35) Conservative (17) Labour (5) Reform (7) Independent (6)

Elections
- Last election: 4 May 2023
- Next election: 6 May 2027

Meeting place
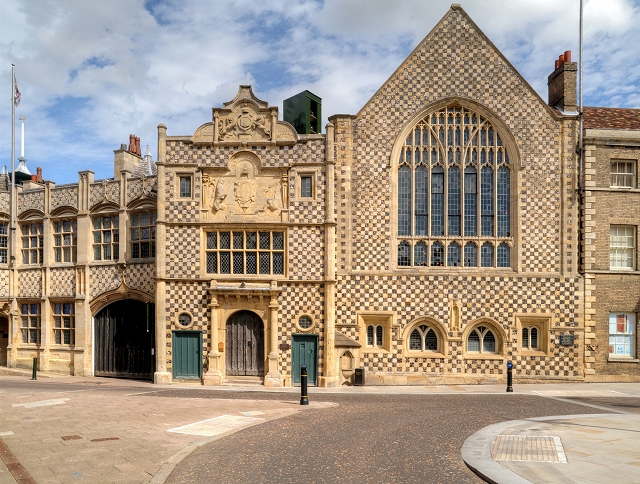
- Town Hall, Saturday Market Place, King's Lynn, PE30 5DQ

Website
- www.west-norfolk.gov.uk

The Borough Council of King's Lynn and West Norfolk provides district-level services. County-level services are provided by Norfolk County Council. Much of the borough is also covered by civil parishes, which form a third tier of local government.

=== Political control ===
The council has been under no overall control since the 2023 election, being run by a coalition of most of the independent councillors, the Liberal Democrats and the Greens with informal support from Labour.

The first election to the council was held in 1973, initially operating as a shadow authority alongside the outgoing authorities until the new arrangements took effect on 1 April 1974. Political control of the council since 1974 has been as follows:

Party in control	Years
No overall control	1974–1976
Conservative	1976–1991
No overall control	1991–1995
Labour	1995–1999
No overall control	1999–2003
Conservative	2003–2023
No overall control	2023–present

=== Leadership ===
The role of mayor is largely ceremonial in King's Lynn and West Norfolk, with political leadership instead provided by the leader of the council. The leaders since 2007 have been:

Councillor	Party	From	To
Nick Daubney	Conservative	2007	12 May 2016
Brian Long	Conservative	12 May 2016	20 May 2021
Stuart Dark	Conservative	20 May 2021	May 2023
Terry Parish	Independent	18 May 2023	May 2024
Alistair Beale	Independent	16 May 2024	

=== Composition ===
Following the 2023 election, and subsequent by-elections and changes of allegiance up to August 2026, the composition of the council was:

Party	Seats
Independent Partnership	17
Liberal Democrats (UK)	2
Your Party	1
Conservative	17
Labour	5
Reform	7
Independent	6
Total	55

Of the independent councillors, 17 sit together as the 'Independent Partnership', which forms the council's administration with the Liberal Democrats and Your Party.

=== Elections ===
Since the last boundary changes in 2019 the council has comprised 55 councillors representing 35 wards, with each ward electing one, two or three councillors. Elections are held every four years.

UK Youth Parliament

Although the UK Youth Parliament is an apolitical organisation, the elections are run in a way similar to that of the Local Elections. The votes come from 11 to 18 year olds and are combined to make the decision of the next, 2 year Member of Youth Parliament. The elections are run at different times across the country with King's Lynn and West Norfolk's typically being in early Spring and bi-annually.

=== Premises ===
The council generally meets at the Town Hall on the Saturday Market Place in King's Lynn, parts of which date back to the 1420s, having replaced an earlier guildhall on the site which burnt down in 1421. The council's main offices are at King's Court, on Chapel Street in King's Lynn, which had been built as speculative offices in 1975, initially being called Aspen House. The council bought the building in 1981.

== Geography ==
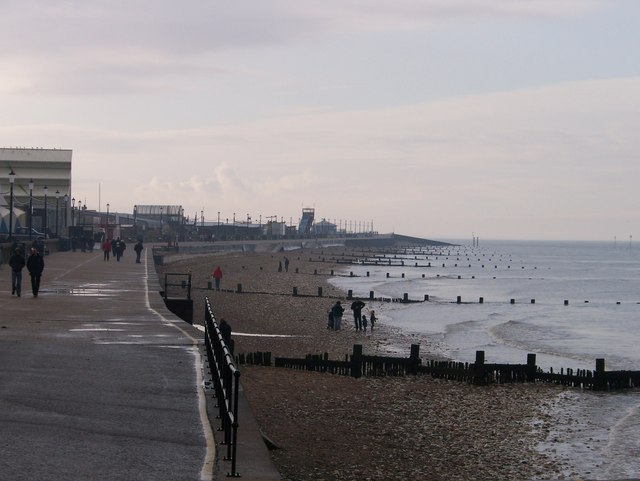
Hunstanton, one of the coastal towns on the Norfolk Coast.

The district comprises the urban area of King's Lynn itself, together with 102 surrounding parishes. At the time of the 2001 census, the district had an area of 1,473 km^{2}, of which 28 km^{2} was in the urban area and 1,445 km^{2} in the surrounding parishes. The district had a population of 135,345 in 58,338 households, with 34,564 in 15,285 households living in the urban area, whilst 100,781 people in 43,053 households lived in the surrounding parishes.

== Towns and parishes ==
The main part of the urban area of King's Lynn (roughly corresponding to the pre-1974 borough of King's Lynn) is an unparished area. The remainder of the district is covered by civil parishes. The parish councils for Downham Market and Hunstanton have declared their parishes to be towns, allowing them to take the style "town council". The parishes are:

- Anmer
- Bagthorpe with Barmer
- Barton Bendish
- Barwick
- Bawsey
- Bircham
- Boughton
- Brancaster
- Burnham Market
- Burnham Norton
- Burnham Overy
- Burnham Thorpe
- Castle Acre
- Castle Rising
- Choseley
- Clenchwarton
- Congham
- Crimplesham
- Denver
- Dersingham
- Docking
- Downham Market
- Downham West
- East Rudham
- East Walton
- East Winch
- Emneth
- Feltwell
- Fincham
- Flitcham with Appleton
- Fordham
- Fring
- Gayton
- Great Massingham
- Grimston
- Harpley
- Heacham
- Hilgay
- Hillington
- Hockwold cum Wilton
- Holme next the Sea
- Houghton
- Hunstanton
- Ingoldisthorpe
- Leziate
- Little Massingham
- Marham
- Marshland St. James
- Methwold
- Middleton
- Nordelph
- North Creake
- North Runcton
- Northwold
- North Wootton
- Old Hunstanton
- Outwell
- Pentney
- Ringstead
- Roydon
- Runcton Holme
- Ryston
- Sandringham
- Sedgeford
- Shernborne
- Shouldham
- Shouldham Thorpe
- Snettisham
- South Creake
- Southery
- South Wootton
- Stanhoe
- Stoke Ferry
- Stow Bardolph
- Stradsett
- Syderstone
- Terrington St. Clement
- Terrington St. John
- Thornham
- Tilney All Saints
- Tilney St. Lawrence
- Titchwell
- Tottenhill
- Upwell
- Walpole
- Walpole Cross Keys
- Walpole Highway
- Walsoken
- Watlington
- Welney
- Wereham
- West Acre
- West Dereham
- West Rudham
- West Walton
- West Winch
- Wiggenhall St. Germans
- Wiggenhall St. Mary Magdalen
- Wimbotsham
- Wormegay
- Wretton

== Arms ==
Coat of arms of King's Lynn and West Norfolk

Crest
Upon a wreath Or and Azure upon a bollard Sable roped Or a seagull Proper gorged with a coronet and holding in the dexter claw a cross botonny fitchy Or.
Escutcheon
Per chevron Azure and Or three dragons' heads erect and erased each transfixed through the mouth by a cross botonny fitchy all within a bordure per chevron counter-changed.
Supporters
On either side a sea lion Or supporting with the exterior leg an ostrich feather Argent.
Badge
A sea lion Or within a garland of oakleaves fructed Proper.
