= St Andrew's Church, Barton Bendish =

Coordinates: 52.6198°N 0.52423°E

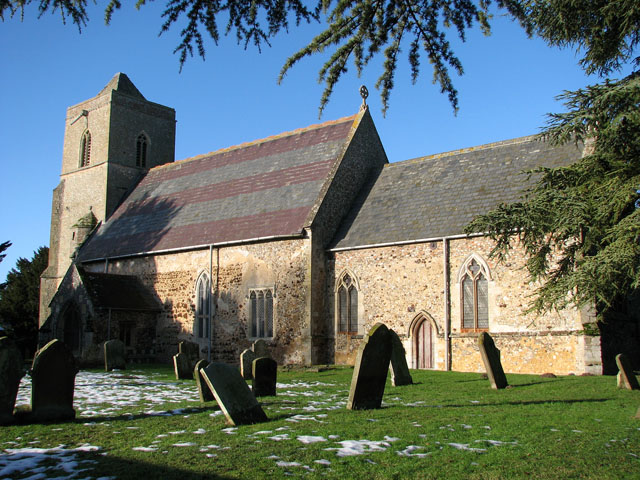
- St Andrew's Church, Barton Bendish, from the southeast

- Location in Norfolk
- OS grid reference: TF 713 057
- Location: Barton Bendish, Norfolk
- Country: England
- Denomination: Anglican
- Churchmanship: Broad Church

Architecture
- Functional status: Parish church
- Heritage designation: Grade I
- Designated: 8 July 1959
- Architectural type: Church
- Style: Gothic
- Groundbreaking: 13th century

Specifications
- Materials: Brick and stone Roofs Slate

St Andrew's Church is a medieval Anglican parish church in the village of Barton Bendish, Norfolk, England. This village used to have two more parish churches –St Mary's Church, and All Saints' Church (demolished). St Andrew's is recorded in the National Heritage List for England as a designated Grade I listed building.

== Overview ==
The dedication of this Anglican church is to St Andrew the Apostle, and it is in the Diocese of Ely. It is the only working place of worship left in the parish. The rural deanery is Fincham and Feltwell, and for purposes of ministry the ecclesiastical parish is grouped with seven others: Beachamwell, Boughton, Fincham, Marham, Shouldham, Shouldham Thorpe and Wereham. The bishop is on record as describing the style of worship as "Stole-wearing rural middle Anglican".

== History ==
There is no evidence of any Saxon or Norman work in the present church fabric, but the Norfolk Archaeological Unit excavated under the floor and in the churchyard in 1981and found Late Saxon pottery as well as foundations interpreted as being of the same date.

The present nave dates from the start of the 13th century. The chancel was added in the 14th century, and the edifice had a makeover in the 15th when the present tower was added. There was a restoration in 1844, when the chancel's piscina and a statue niche next to the chancel arch were discovered behind plaster and cleaned out. Another restoration in 1868 replaced the thatched roofs with slate.

== Exterior ==
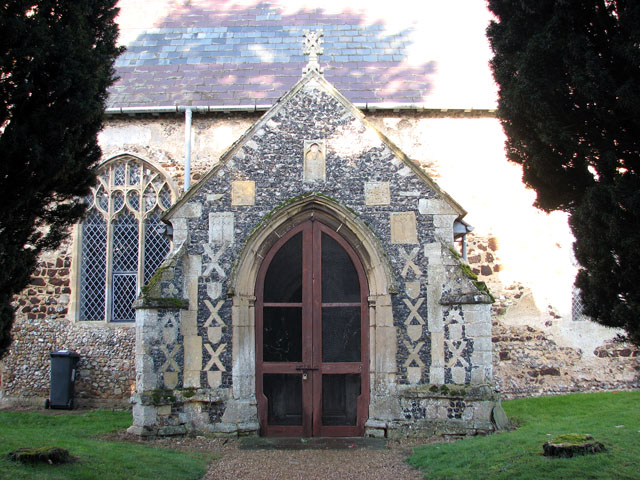
St Andrew's church - elaborate flushwork decoration on south porch

The church has a west tower, a rather short unaisled nave measuring about 55 x 19 feet (17 x 6 metres) with a south porch, and a chancel which is substantially lower and measures about 33 x 15 feet (10 x 4.5 metres). The walls are in flint and carrstone rubble, with areas of rotten lime plaster render which has mostly fallen off. Quoins and architectural details are in ashlar.The roofs are in slate -the chancel is in grey, but the nave has horizontal bands of purple and grey.

The 15th-century Perpendicular tower has three storeys, separated by two simple string courses. A third string course, embellished by saltire crosses in honour of St Andrew, is below a red brick parapet and has a drainage gargoyle on the north and south sides. There is a pyramidal cap. The western corners each have a diagonal buttress with an ogee topped statue niche. The west face has a processional door with a hood mould, and a large three-light window above with Perpendicular tracery. Notable is the brick stair-turret on the south side, which is semi-octagonal in plan. The sound-holes have Y-tracery. There is a clock, facing west for symmetry -which means that it is invisible from the street.

The nave fenestration is variable. On the south side, a second large three-light 15th century traceried Perpendicular window is to the left of the porch, and to the right is a tall late 13th century window with Y-tracery and a transom. Further east is a contrasting three-light Perpendicular window with no tracery and a flat hood mould. On the north side are three lancets, c, 1200, and one blocked which is over a blocked doorway, and a third three-light Perpendicular window.

The chancel has a simple string course running around it, and this hops over a south priest's door to form a hood mould for it. There are two two-light windows in the Decorated style in the south side, and one in the north. The east window has flowing mouchette tracery, c. 1330. The east corners have diagonal buttresses.

The 15th century south porch is in fine knapped flintwork, and its entrance elevation has elaborate flushwork incorporating saltire crosses and stone tablets depicting shields and emblems of St Andrew. Above the portal is a niche containing a low-relief representation of the saint holding his cross. The roof timbers are original. The church doorway within is in the Transitional style -Norman, but with a pointed arch dating to c. 1200. The doorcase is framed in an arch springing from a pair of engaged columns with waterleaf capitals, and which has two orders of roll moulding under a hood mould with billets (little decorative blocks). The holy water stoup survives.

== Interior ==
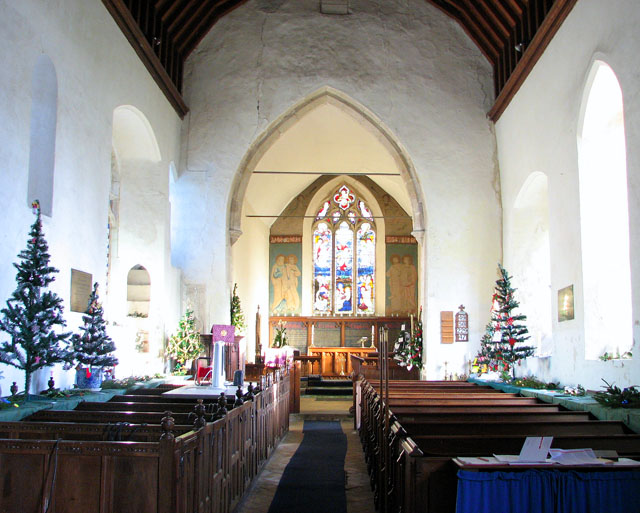
St Andrew's church - view east

The interior walling is mostly in white. The roofing timbers date from the 1868 restoration. The tower arch, now occupied by the organ, is impressively tall and has wave moulding. The north wall lancet windows have deep splays. The chancel arch is undecorated, except that a thinner archivolt is inserted which springs from a pair of polygonal corbels. To the left of the arch, behind the pulpit, is an ornate 15th century statue niche and here also can be seen remnants of the former rood screen staircase. The southern set of pews are from the 1844 restoration, but the north set are dated 1623 and are ornately carved. The font is octagonal, as plain as it could be.

The chancel has a well-preserved piscina with flowing tracery matching the east window and two drains (one for the water from the lavabo at Mass, the other for the water from washing the sacred vessels). There is also a stepped sedilia. Medieval floor tiling survives here, in small tiles which were cheap glazed imitations of encaustics. Most of the glazing, and hence the decoration, has worn off these.

The stained glass in the church is Victorian. The east window depicts the Ascension of Christ, designed by one Mrs Nelson in 1884. She also did the two murals flanking the window, which depict the Four Evangelists.On stylistic grounds, she is thought to have been a cartoonist for the firm of Heaton, Butler and Bayne. A chancel side window depicts the apostles Peter and Andrew, and a nave side window has the symbols of the Evangelists in its upper lights.
