= St Mary's Church, Barton Bendish =

Coordinates: 52.6198°N 0.52423°E

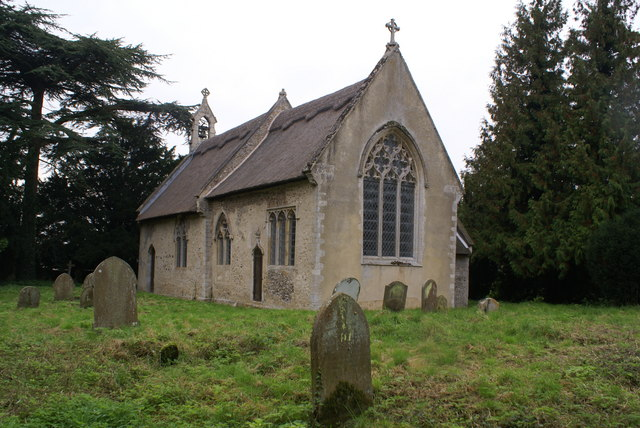
- St Mary's Church, Barton Bendish, from the southeast

- Location in Norfolk
- OS grid reference: TF 709 054
- Location: Barton Bendish, Norfolk
- Country: England
- Denomination: Anglican
- Website: Churches Conservation Trust

Architecture
- Functional status: Redundant
- Heritage designation: Grade I
- Designated: 8 July 1959
- Architectural type: Church
- Style: Norman, Gothic
- Groundbreaking: 14th century

Specifications
- Materials: Brick and stone Roofs thatched

St Mary's Church is a redundant medieval Anglican church in the village of Barton Bendish, Norfolk, England. This village had two more parish churches –St Andrew's Church, and All Saints' Church (demolished). St Mary's is recorded in the National Heritage List for England as a designated Grade I listed building, and is under the care of the Churches Conservation Trust. The architectural historian Nikolaus Pevsner was of the opinion that its west door is "one of the best Norman doorways in England". The church stands in an isolated position to the west of the village.

== History ==
=== Saxons ===
Archaeological surveys through fieldwalking have shown that Middle and Late Saxon settlement was concentrated around the site of the church. The scholarly consensus has been that all three of the village's churches had Late Saxon foundations, although only two are mentioned in the Domesday Book survey of 1086 -it is uncertain as to which church is missing, or why. In 1979 a soakaway ditch was dug around the church, which yielded many sherds of Late Saxon pottery but no evidence of any Saxon church building. These sherds were probably domestic refuse.

=== Medieval ===
The present church fabric dates from the 14th century. The archaeological survey by Rogerson et al. in 1987 concluded that the chancel, with its very fine Decorated Gothic east window, was built first, c. 1340. This would have abutted a putative earlier nave for which no evidence has survived. Subsequently, this old nave and part of the new chancel were demolished for a matching nave, c. 1370. This was noted as being both inferior in construction and in design to the chancel –"oafishly ill-proportioned" and "preposterously provincial". The present south door replaced a former window, so measuring to accommodate an original south door gives an approximate original length of the nave at 14.2 metres (46.6 feet). The present nave is about 7.3 metres (24 feet) long. There was a south porch, and a wall of this was found in the 1979 drainage works.

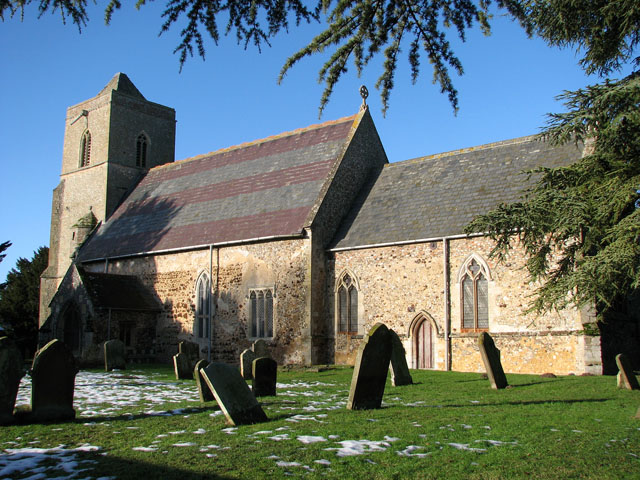
Before 1710 the church had a similar appearance to St Andrew's nearby

The church formerly had a tower, and a bequest for bells left by the Lord of the manor in 1421 indicates that it was newly built then and so would have been in the Perpendicular style. This would have made the church very similar to St Andrew's Church. (The village's manor house of Barton Hall still stands just north of St Mary's.) At about the same time a north vestry was apparently built, because the surviving ornate chancel door leading to it has a portrait bust of a lady with a hairstyle of the early 15th century. Also, there was some remodelling because the south chancel wall has a Perpendicular window of later date.

The Reformation had little impact here, apart from the usual vandalism of interior fixtures and fittings such as the rood screen. A note dated 1731, which was probably originally in the papers of the antiquarian Francis Blomefield, indicates that rood stairs were still extant then. . Unusually for multi-church Norfolk villages, the Reformation was not made the excuse to "rationalise" and all three parish churches survived -unlike neighbouring Beachamwell for example, where one of the three there did not.

=== 18th century ===
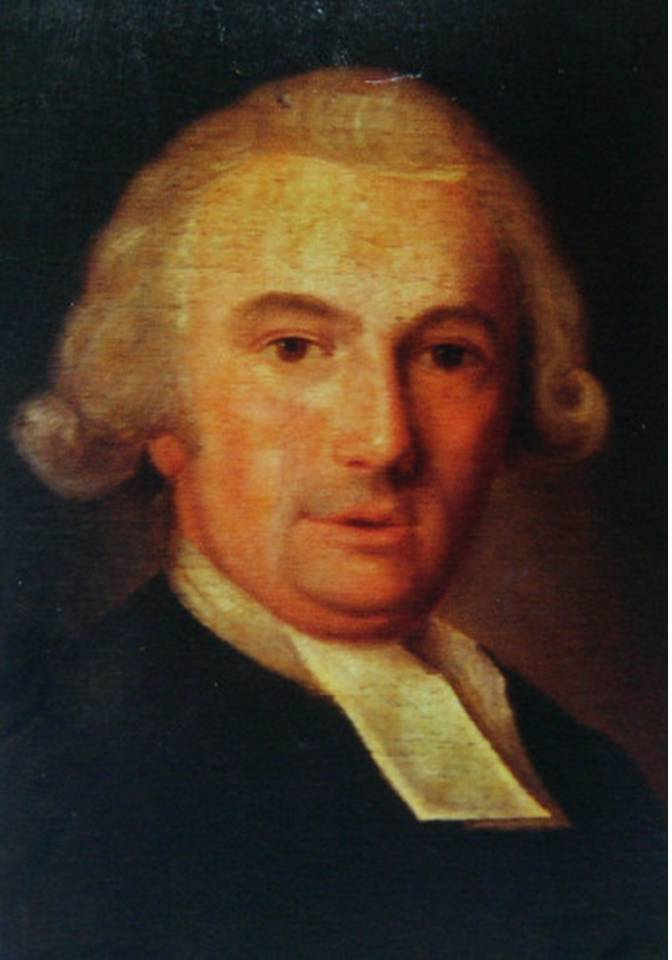
Robert Forby, church restorer.

The tower failed catastrophically in 1710, and destroyed the west half of the nave in its fall. The south porch survived. The 1731 note referred to above describes the stump of the tower surviving to a height of a foot (30 cm), the south porch as being "small and tiled" and the north vestry as derelict. According to a note in the parish register made by Forby, the rector responsible for the 1789 restoration, the porch was functioning as a vestry instead. This would have entailed blocking up the doorway and re-hanging the door in the portal (or vice versa), thus creating a stand-alone building. According to a comment written by Blomefield, the western void left by the ruin was filled by a temporary wall created by setting the rubble in cob. This would have meant that the only entrance to the church was via the narrow priest's door in the south chancel wall.

In the Eighties of this century the noted philologist, botanist and clergyman Robert Forby was resident in the village. As clergyman he held the benefices of Horningtoft and Barton Bendish St Mary's, and arranged the proper restoration of the latter church in 1788-89. He subsequently became rector of Fincham, where his name is better known.

In 1787 the parishes of All Saints and St Mary at Barton Bendish were united as one benefice, allowing for the disposal of one of the two churches. It was decided to demolish All Saints in 1788, to use some of its materials in the repair of St Mary's and sell the rest to raise money for the restoration, which was overseen by Forby. During this process a 12th-century doorway was salvaged in toto, moved from All Saints and set in the new west wall at St Mary's.

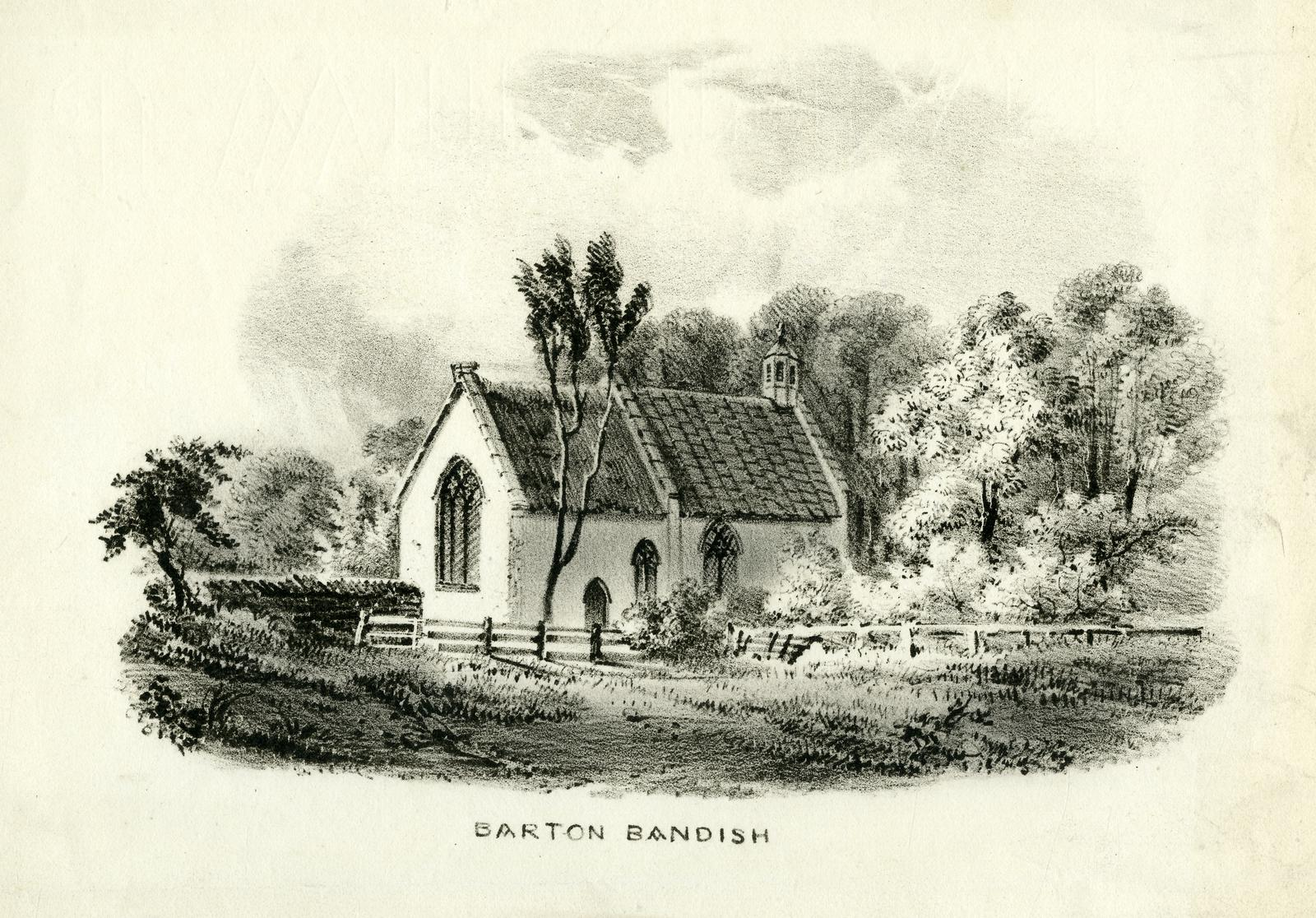
Barton Bandish St Mary's after the 1789 restoration.

As well as a proper west wall and processional entrance, a new south doorway was inserted and the derelict north vestry demolished. The remains of the tower were cleared away, and apparently the vestiges of the rood stair were removed too. On top of the new west gable was put an attractive little octagonal bell-turret with a ogee cap, vaguely Baroque. The chancel roof was left in thatch, but the nave roof was apparently re-done in pantiles. The floor was re-laid in brick, and box pews provided. The new external appearance of the church was recorded in an extant engraving (q.v.). The restoration cost £80 (2022: £12 852) and the sale of All Saints' salvage (including its bells) fetched £56.755, so the balance had to come out of Forby's own pocket.

=== 19th century ===
There were further restorations in 1858, 1865 and 1871. In 1858, the upper part of the west wall was rebuilt and a two-light window inserted. In 1865, the interior was re-ordered and the box pews cut down. In 1871, the bell-turret was replaced by a bellcote. Either then or subsequently the tiled and thatched roofs were re-done in slate, and this was first noted in 1903. The demolished north vestry was rebuilt, and the old south porch vestry demolished in lieu.

=== Redundancy ===
The church was last used for regular worship in 1967, and was formally made redundant in 1974. Fortunately it was vested in what is now the Churches Conservation Trust, which oversaw the latest restoration in 1976. Surprisingly this had a romantic element, because the slate roofs were replaced by thatch (including for the Victorian vestry) instead of being repaired. The nave roof had not been under thatch since 1789.

Since then, the church has been kept open for visitors and occasional liturgical services are held.

== Architecture ==
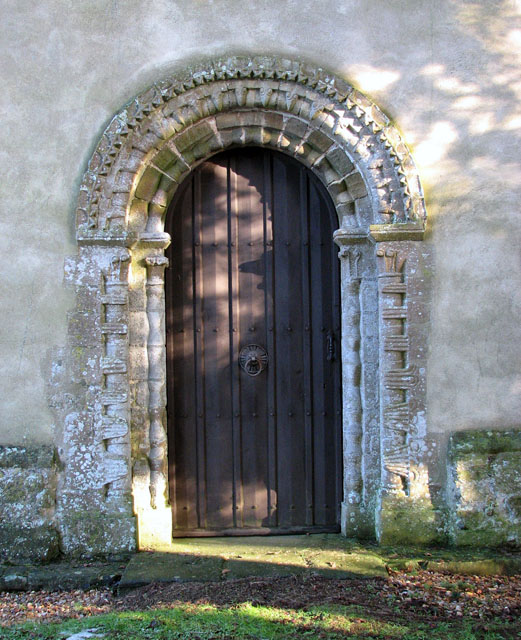
The Norman west doorway, brought here from All Saints' church

=== Exterior ===
==== Plan and fabric ====
The plan is simple, consisting of a nave and a narrower chancel with a north vestry abutting the latter. The chancel and nave are not perfectly aligned, with the former inclining slightly to the right. The walls are constructed in small, roughly coursed flints with some brick and carrstone admixture, and the wall surfaces used to be rendered. Much of this survives, and that on the east wall and the eastern part of the north wall was freshly applied in 1976. Architectural details are in limestone, including quoins and the capping stones of the foundation plinth. The roofs are thatched, with the pitch of the nave one being steeper which helps to disguise the oddity that the nave walls are lower than the chancel ones.

==== West wall and doorway ====
The west wall has its rendered lower courses dating from 1789 and the upper, rough flint ones from 1858 which is also the date of the two-light window in the Early English style. This has a circular eyelet. The 1789 work seems to be in salvaged limestone ashlar, and has a high plinth with roll-moulded capping stones. Three courses of brick separate the wall zones. On the west gable is a bellcote of 1871 with a wheel cross finial.

The west doorway dates from the middle of the 12th century, and was salvaged from the demolished All Saints' Church in 1789. It is ornate. The arch proper has two orders, the inner one of which is embellished with continuous bobbin decoration on shafts and voussoirs. The outer order has its voussoirs embellished with standard beakheads, but the shafts have oddly stylized beakheads which become progressively narrower from bottom to top. The shaft capitals have thin volutes, except for the inner north one which seems to have small rosettes (the stone is weathered). The hood mould has an inner order of dog-tooth and an outer one of semi-circular incisions.

==== Nave side walls ====
Each of the nave side walls has a two light window in the Decorated style, c. 1370, except that the tracery is very poorly designed. This pair of windows used to be deeper, but the bottom 19 inches (0.5 metres) have been blocked. West of both windows can be discerned traces of a pair of lost windows, which in the south wall are next to a doorway with a plain arch which was inserted to replace the window here in 1789. The masonry to the west of these window traces is of the same year. Near the nave's south-east corner the wall has been patched with scavenged stonework from the church's former rood stair. The east gable is prominent, and arises from corbelled-out moulded consoles.

==== Chancel walls ====
The east wall has a very fine large three-light Decorated window, c. 1320, with a hood moulding which ends in carved portrait bust stops featuring a king and a queen. The gable above is prominent like the east nave one, but the moulded consoles each have a carving of Atlas bearing his burden. A similar pair of matching two-light early 14th-century windows are in the side walls, near the nave. These also have fine portrait bust hood stops, with the ones to the north described as "sad-looking" (the northern portion of a churchyard was traditionally viewed with disfavour, and miscreants and paupers could be buried here). As with the nave windows, the lower parts of both of these have been blocked up.

In the south wall to the east is a three-light Perpendicular-style square-headed window with no tracery; the church's listed building description has this as 19th century, but the 1987 survey disagrees and puts it in the 15th century. The church of St Andrew's has a very similar window, inserted when the Perpendicular tower there was built.

In between the two windows in the south wall is the narrow priest's door. This has an ogee head clasped by a hood mould with crockets, which springs from a pair of lion-head stops and is crowned by an oversized finial.

The Victorian vestry abuts the north wall near its east end. It has a hooded single-light window in each side wall, but what looks like a window in the gable wall is actually a hooded niche containing a wooden board painted to resemble a window. The gable above was heightened when the roof was thatched in 1976. In the chancel wall just west of the vestry are traces of an original doorway, which existed before the medieval vestry was built.

=== Interior ===
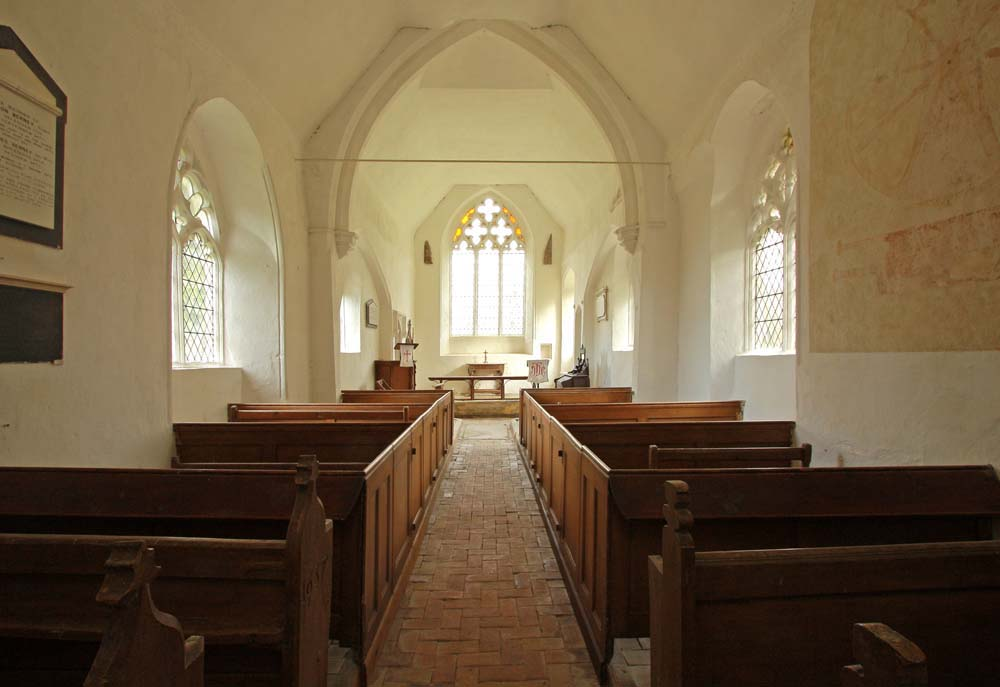
Church interior, wall painting on right

==== Nave ====
The interior is in white, including the boarded and plastered ceiling vault. Behind the latter, the roof timbers are scissor-trusses. The floor is in brick, laid in a herringbone pattern in 1789. The box pews are of the same date, but these were cut down in size in 1865. Older pews survive, dated 1637.

On the south wall of the nave are the remains of a medieval wall painting apparently depicting Saint Catherine with her wheel. The identification is not conclusive, and an alternative description has this as a Wheel of Fortune.

The chancel arch is of a similar design to that at the nearby St Andrew's Church. It has a chamfer, and a thinner archivolt is inserted which springs from a pair of polygonal moulded corbels. The top of the arch is obscured by the ceiling vault, and the top bead of the corbel mouldings continues as a short string course across the east nave wall.

The nave glass is all clear, except for the west window of two lights which has Victorian stained glass. This depicts Christ blessing the children (Mk 10:13-16) and the raising of Jairus' daughter. The font is Victorian, 1857 and octagonal with a tracery panel in each side in 14th century style. The north wall has two funerary tablets of former Lords of the Manor, the upper white marble pedimented one to Hanson Berney 1870 and his wife Agnes, and the lower black marble one to Matthew William Gotobed 1953. The latter had died in a shooting accident.

==== Chancel ====
The chancel walling and ceiling is in the same style as the nave and the two share the same 1789 brick floor. The sanctuary is raised a step, and has flooring of the same date which incorporates two salvaged grave-slabs. To the left is a worn limestone coffin-cover, possibly 14th century and having a wheel-cross with ribbons in shallow relief. To the right is a black slab ledger stone dedicated to the Tiffin family, with the latest year given being 1743. It has a sunk relief of a skull with crossed palm branches and ribbons; weirdly, the church guide describes this as an octopus!

The chancel side windows are within wide wall arch recesses, which are cut short by the chancel arch. This is evidence that the chancel was built before the nave, and used to be longer. The window embrasures meld into the intradoses of these arches.

The priest's doorway to the right is undecorated, in contrast to its exterior. Then comes a simple step sedilia inserted into the embrasure of the three-light Perpendicular window. Below the seat is a row of decorative four-petalled blossoms. In the east wall, to the right of the communion table, is a simple ambry (now doorless) where one would expect the piscina of the medieval altar. The latter is gone, and is replaced by an ornate wooden communion table dated 1633. Above, the east window's embrasure continues down to a shelf which looks like the original altar's gradine. On the wall flanking the window are two triangular pieces of wood each carved with an angel -the original purpose of these items is unknown. The original ambry in the north wall is ornate, and has an ogee-topped frame with tracery and a crowning finial, also a pair of thin little pinnacles with crockets. Compare the exterior of the priest's doorway. To the left is the vestry doorway, which has a moulded doorcase enclosed by a rectangular hood mould with carved leaves in the spandrels. The hood mould stops are portrait busts with ornate headdresses.

As with the nave, the window glass is clear except that the east window has some yellow bits in the tracery which look like the very beginnings of an abortive project to insert stained glass.

The chancel has two wall memorials. To the south is that to Philip and Anne Jenney 1819, in a simple Neoclassical style and signed by the sculptor Snare of Thetford. A line of Latin reads Moerens hoc marmor a fratre positum est (This marble was placed by the mourning brother). Opposite is a simple triangular-topped slab commemorating Stephen Gooch Read, who was rector of the church for 59 years from 1865 until two years before he died in 1926.

== Gallery ==
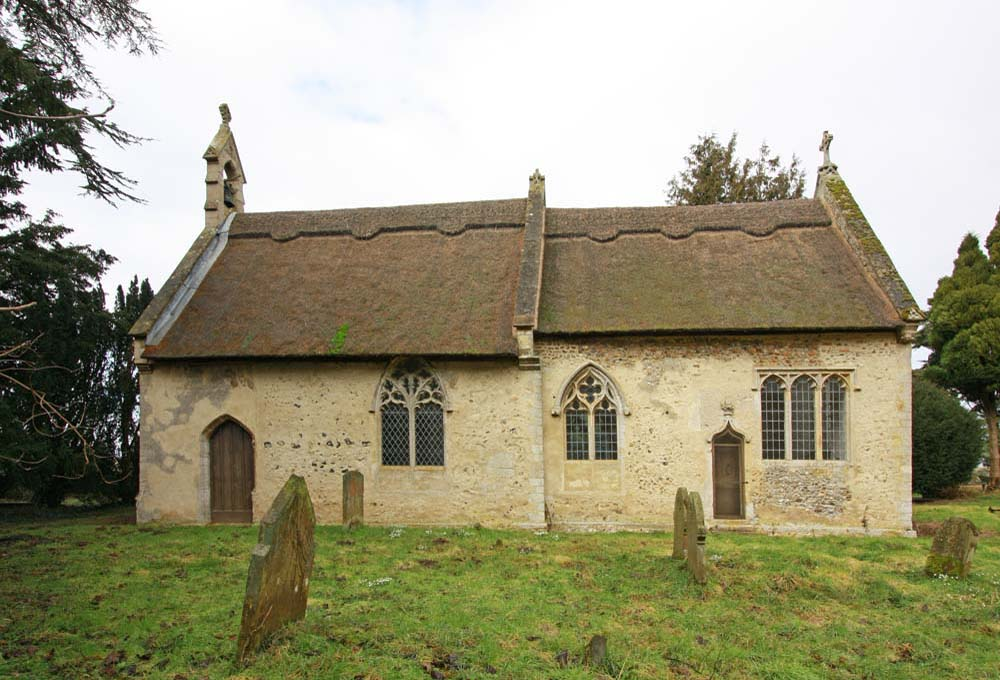
South side

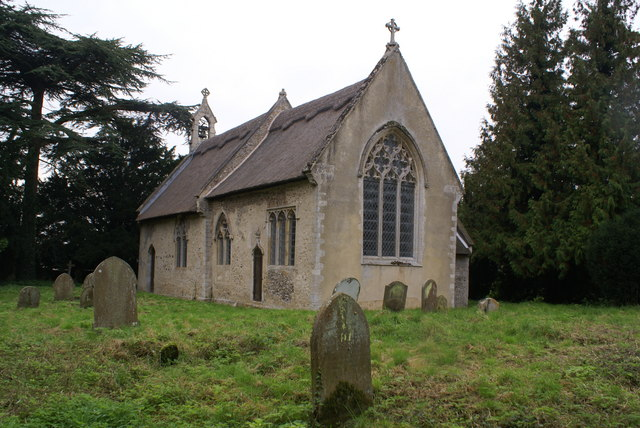
East elevation

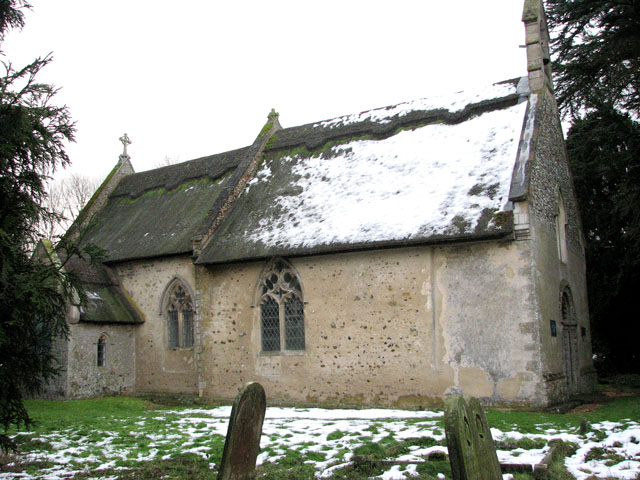
North side

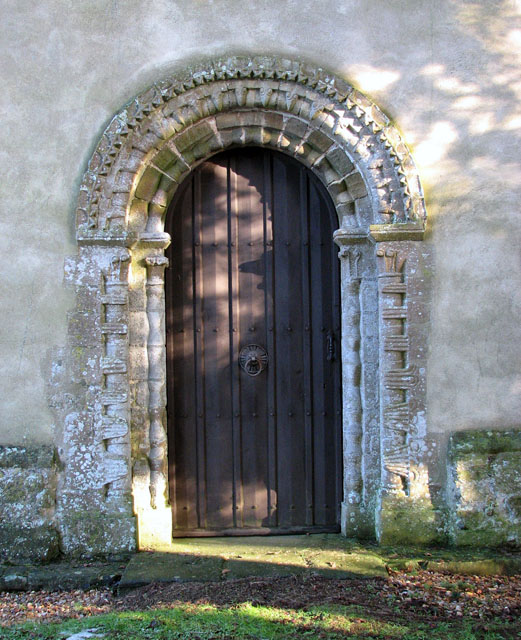
West doorway

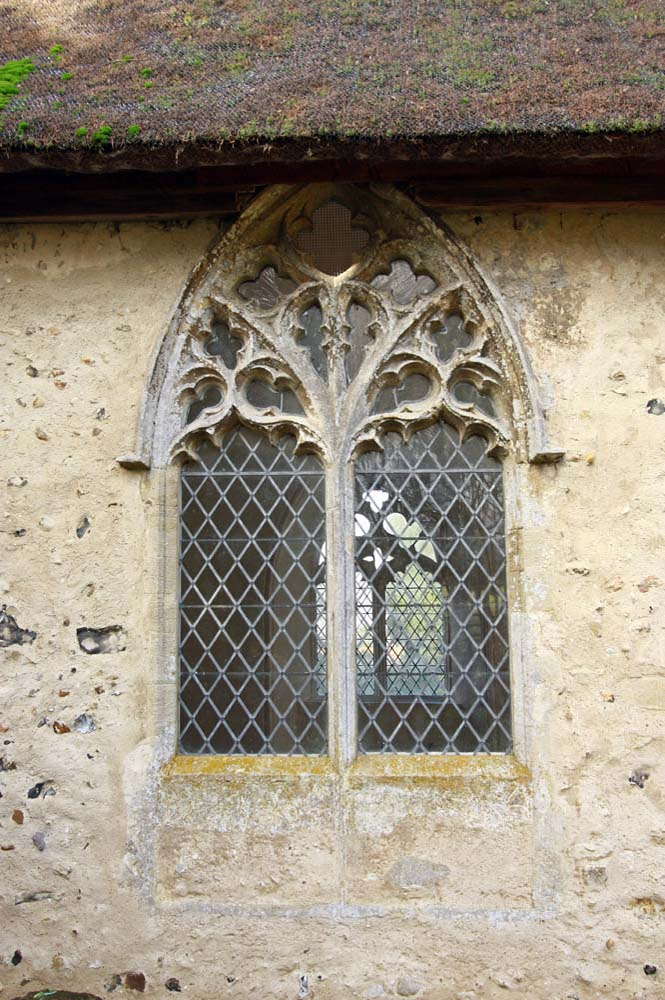
South nave window

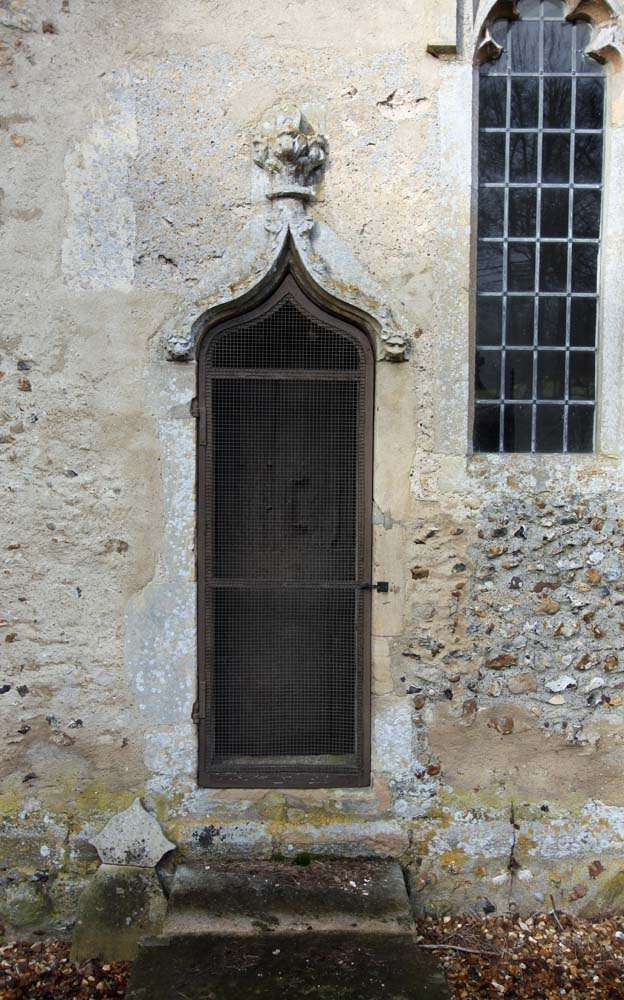
Priest's door

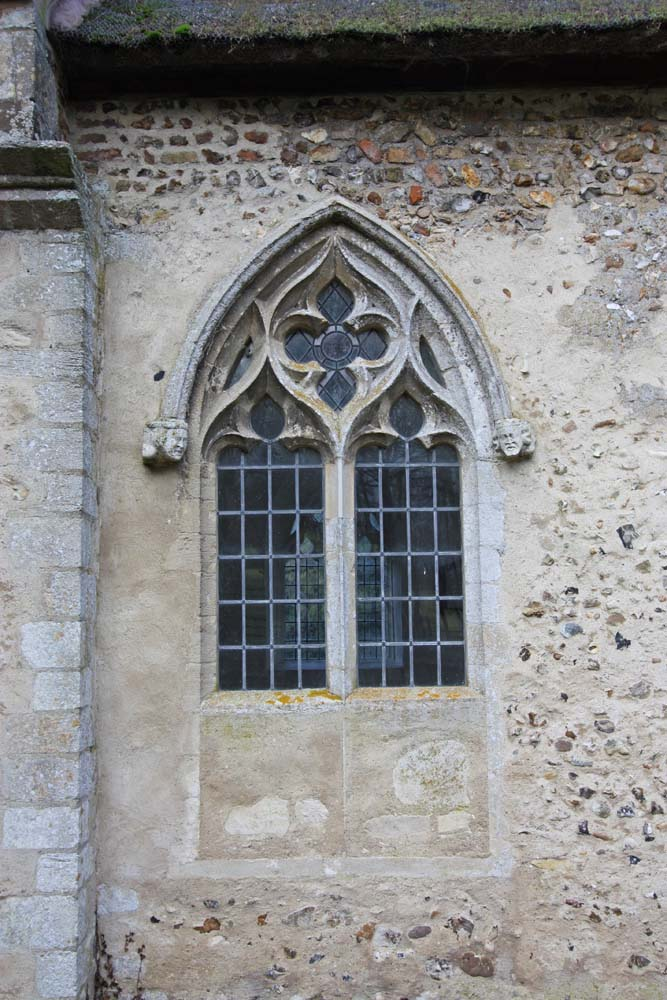
South-west chancel window (note blocking)

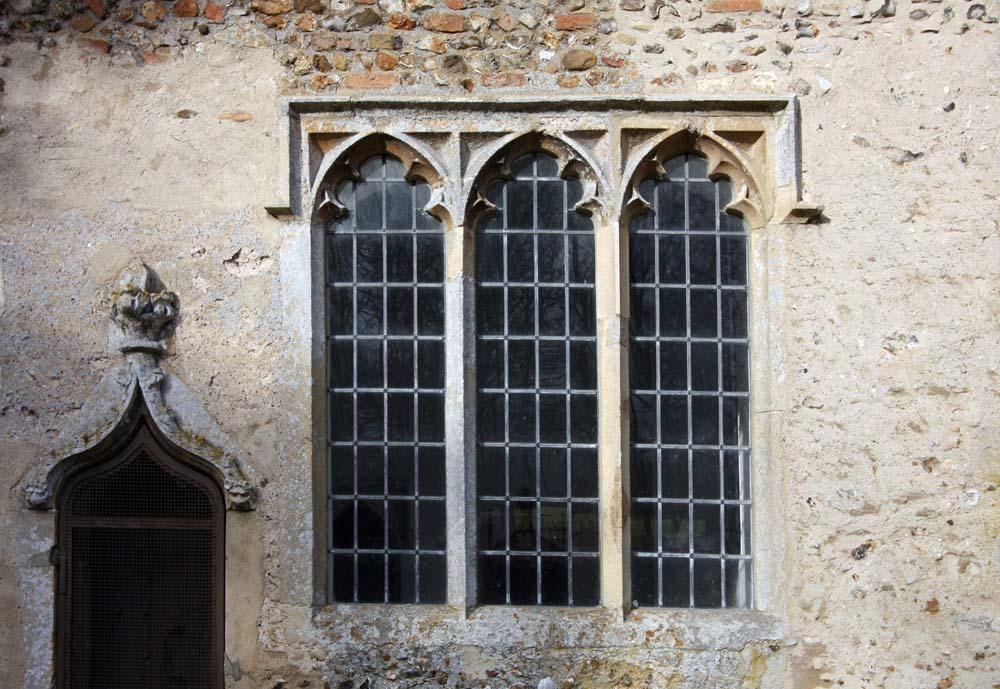
South-east chancel window, Perpendicular style

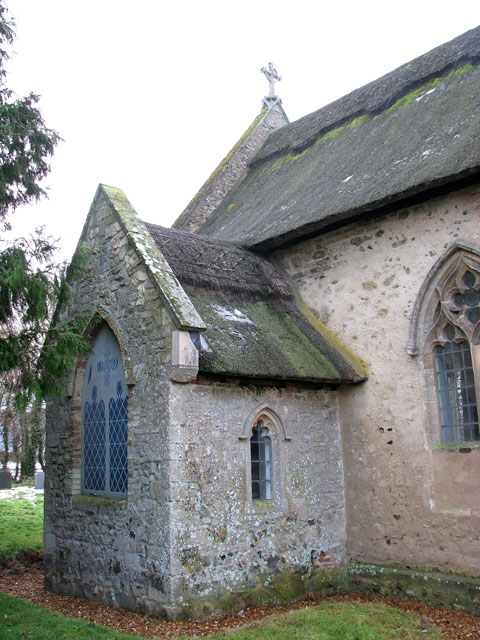
Vestry

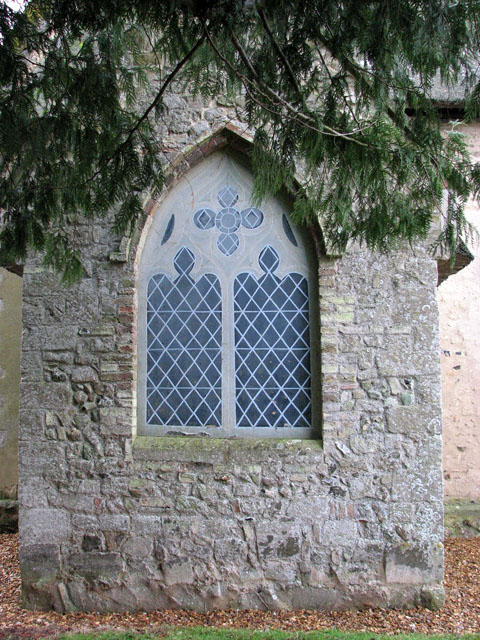
Fake vestry window

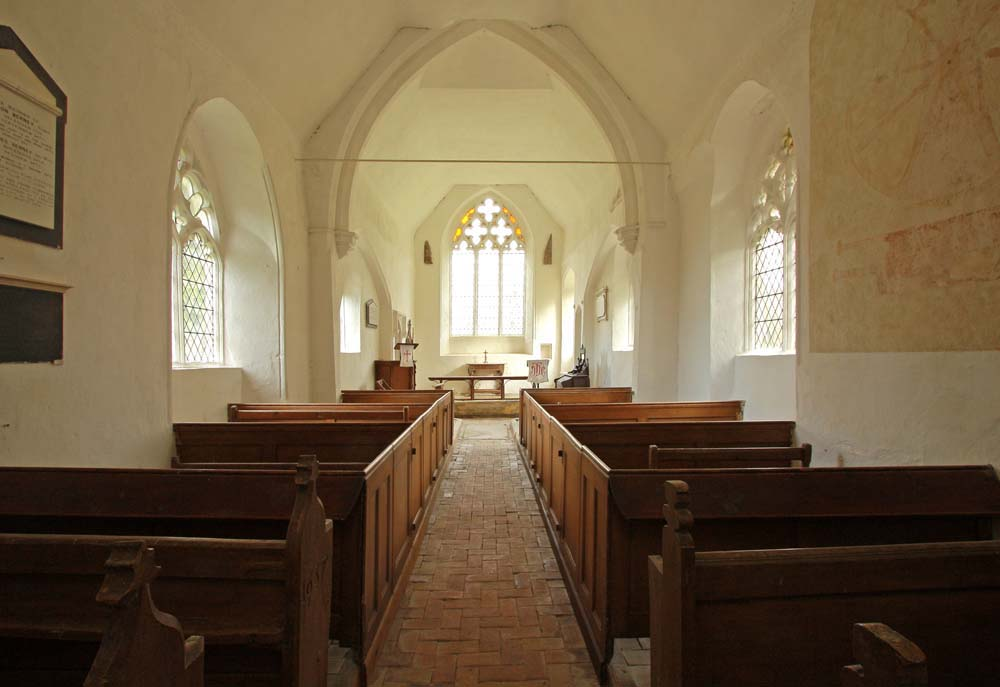
Interior from west end

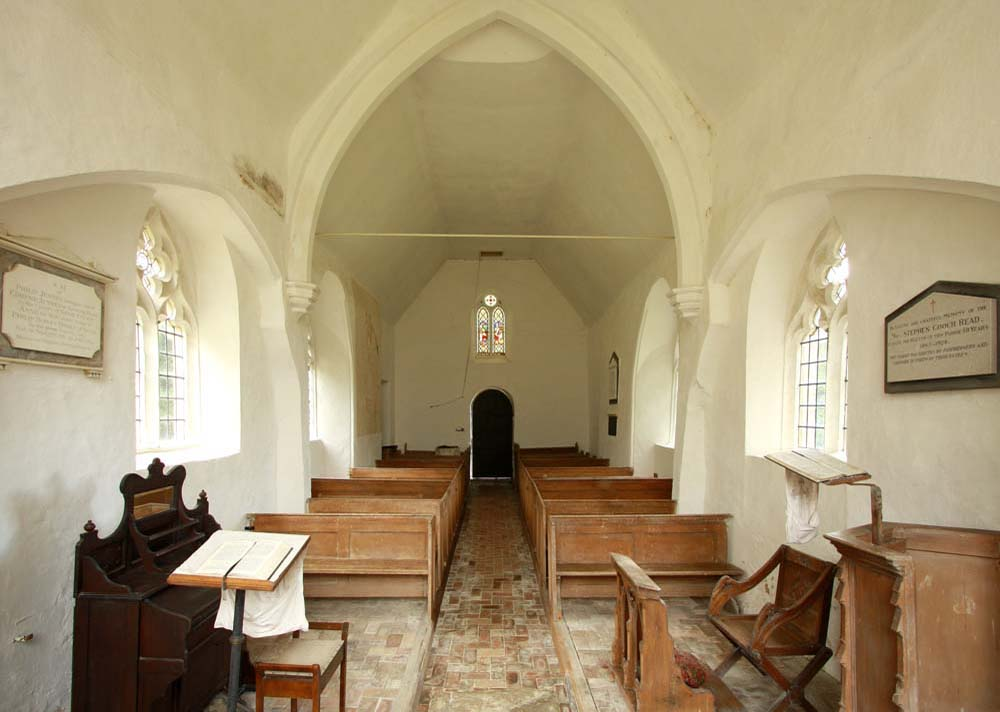
Interior from east end

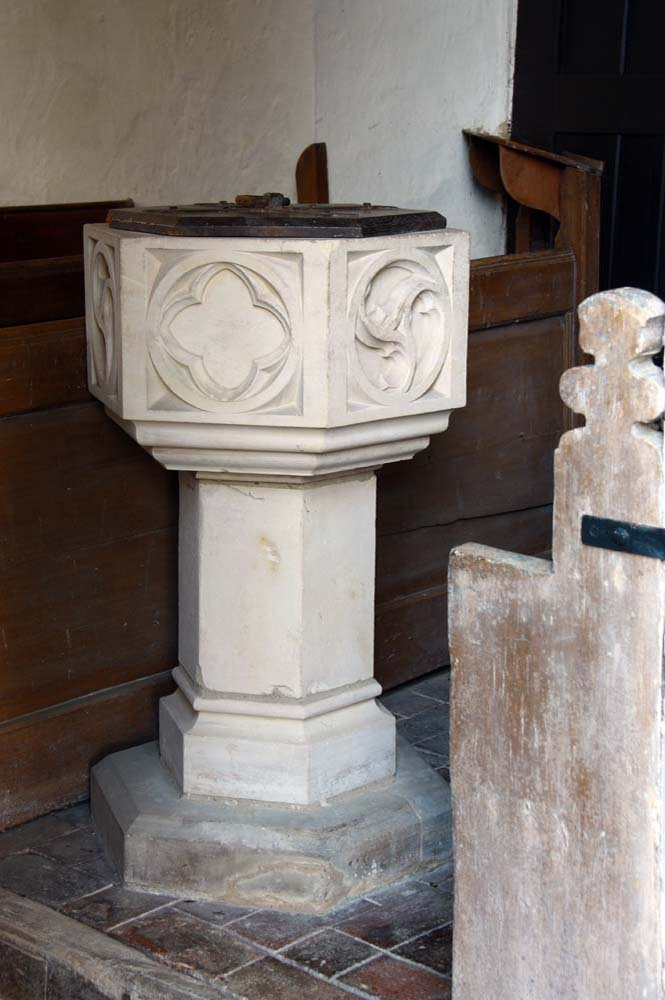
Font

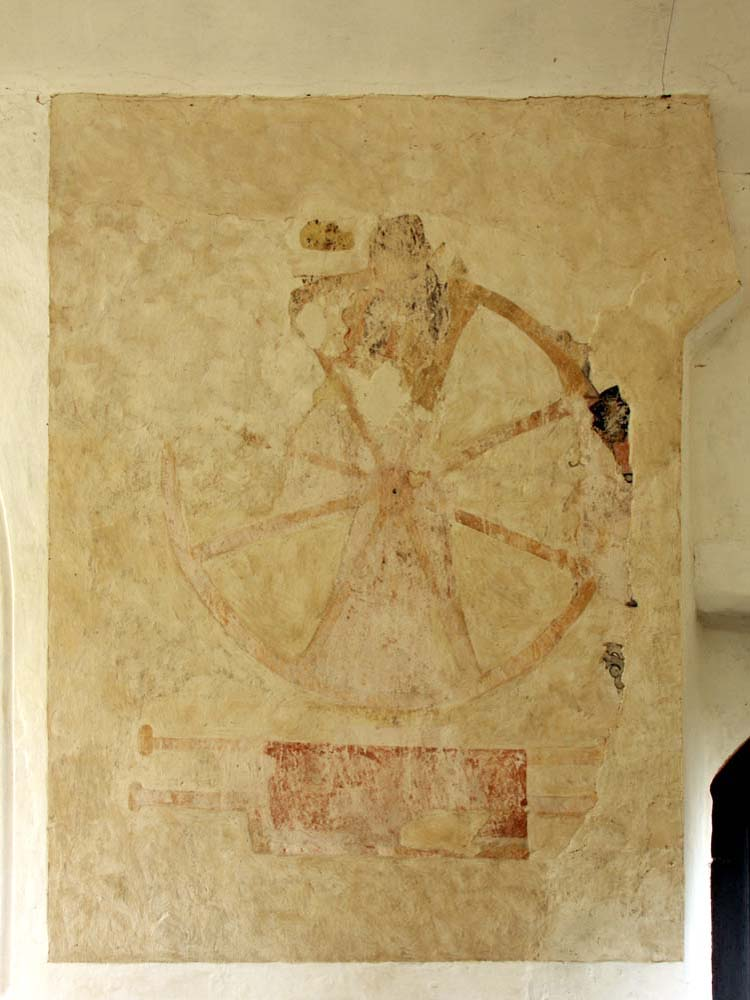
Catherine wheel mural

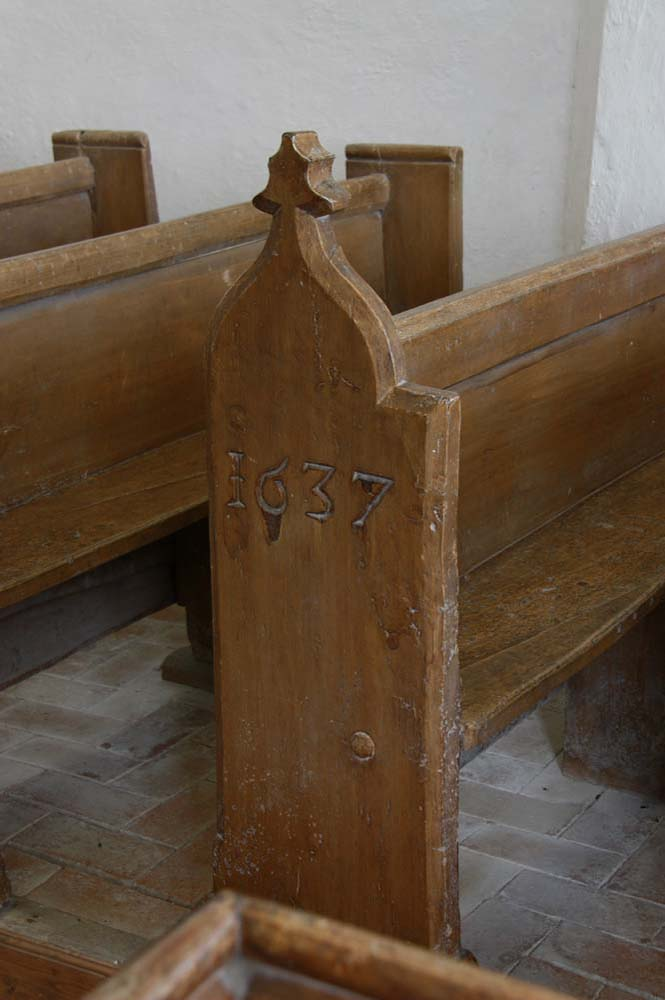
Pews dated 1637

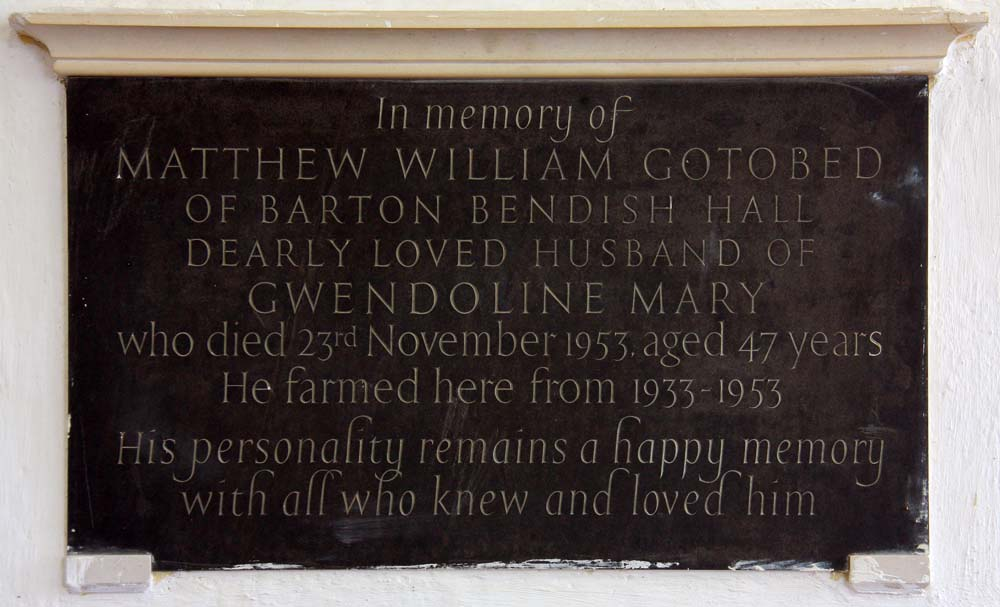
Gotobed memorial

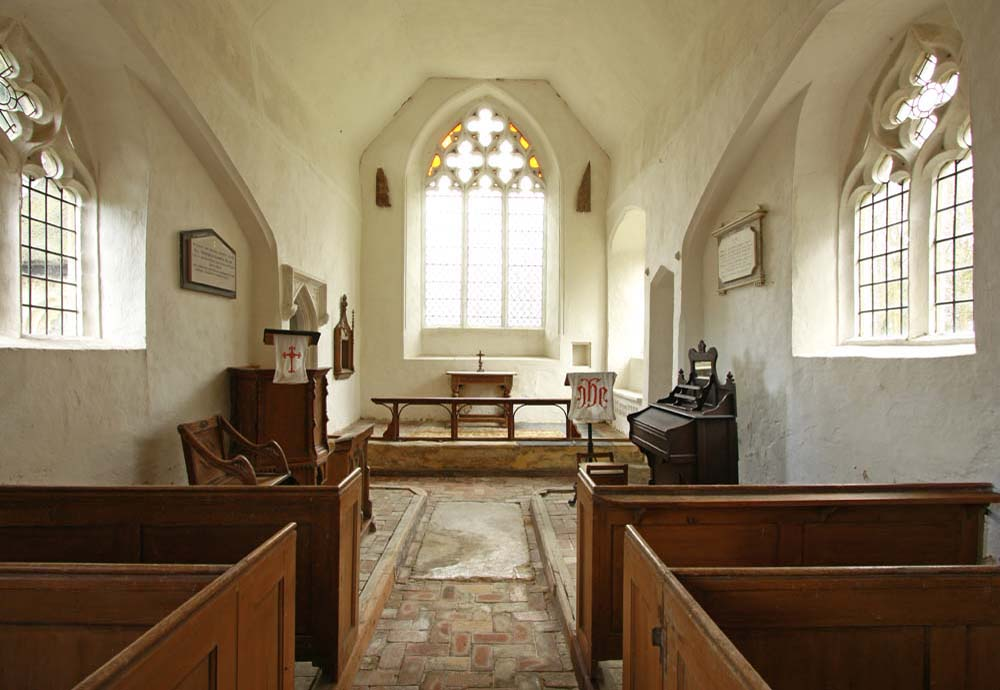
Chancel

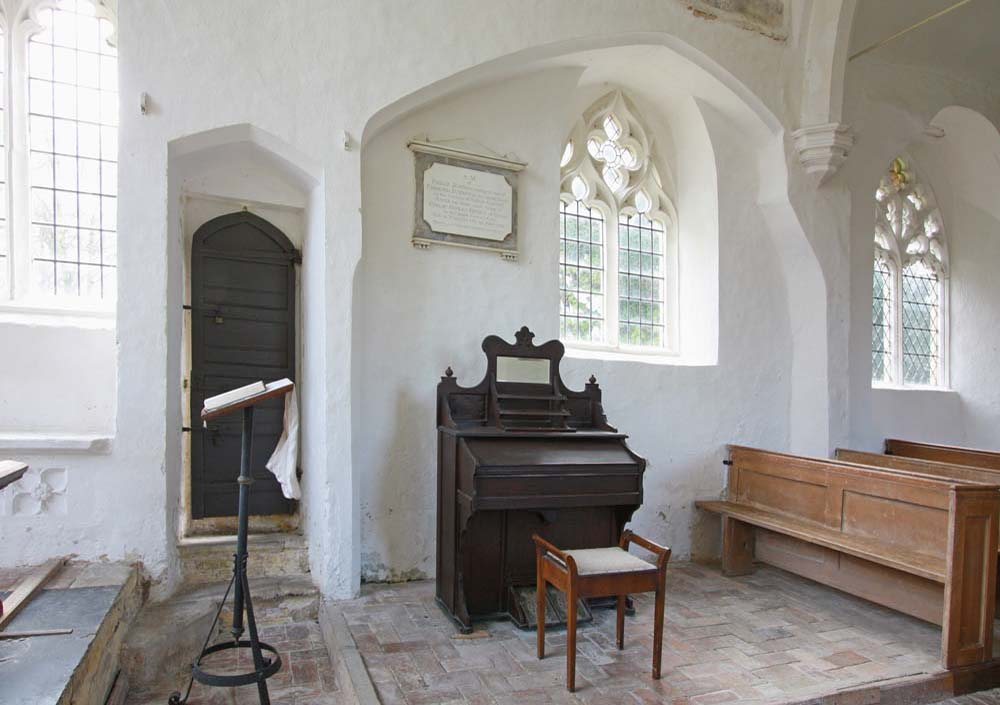
Chancel south side with priest's door

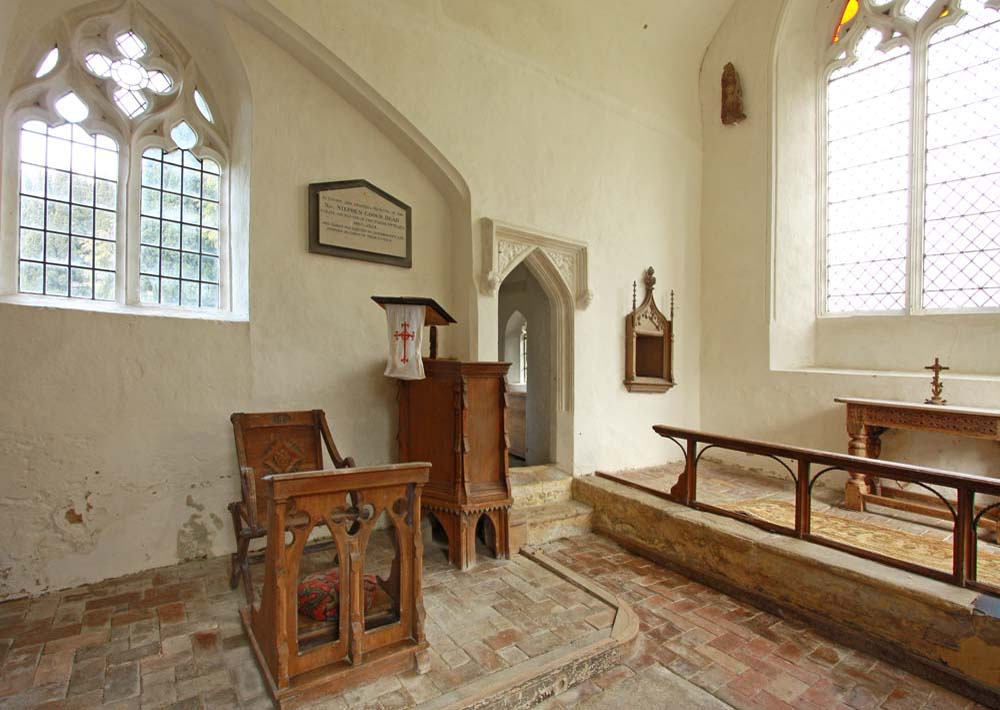
Chancel north side with vestry door

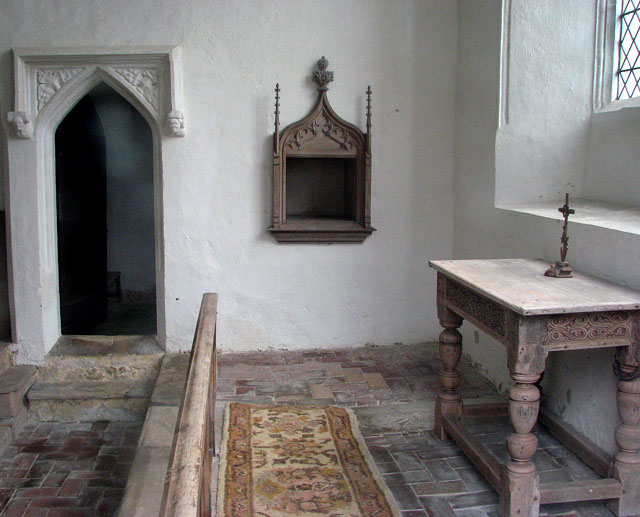
Vestry door, ambry and communion table

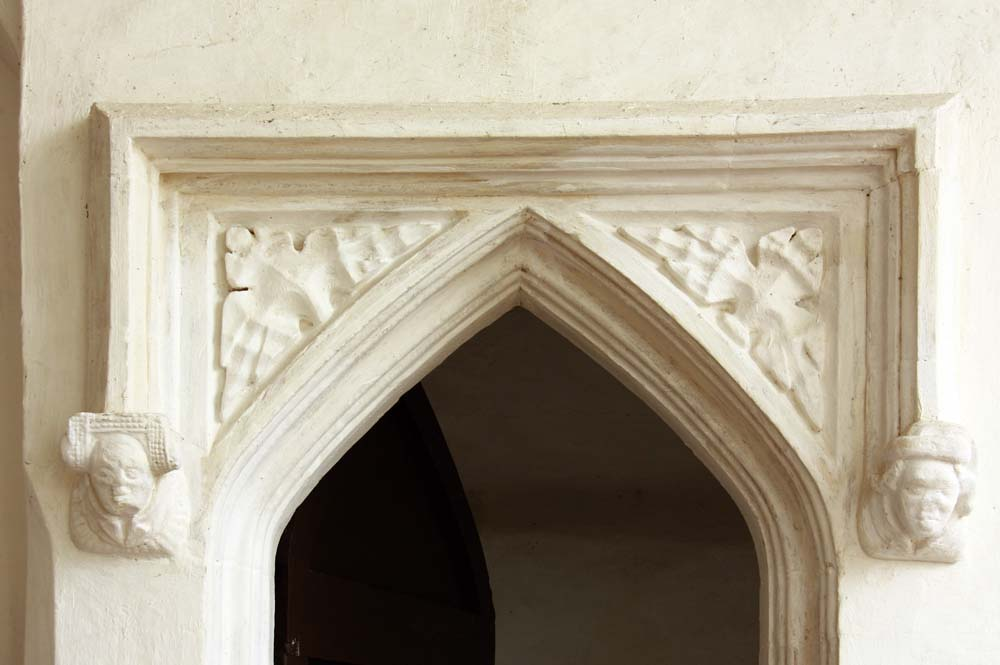
Vestry door hood

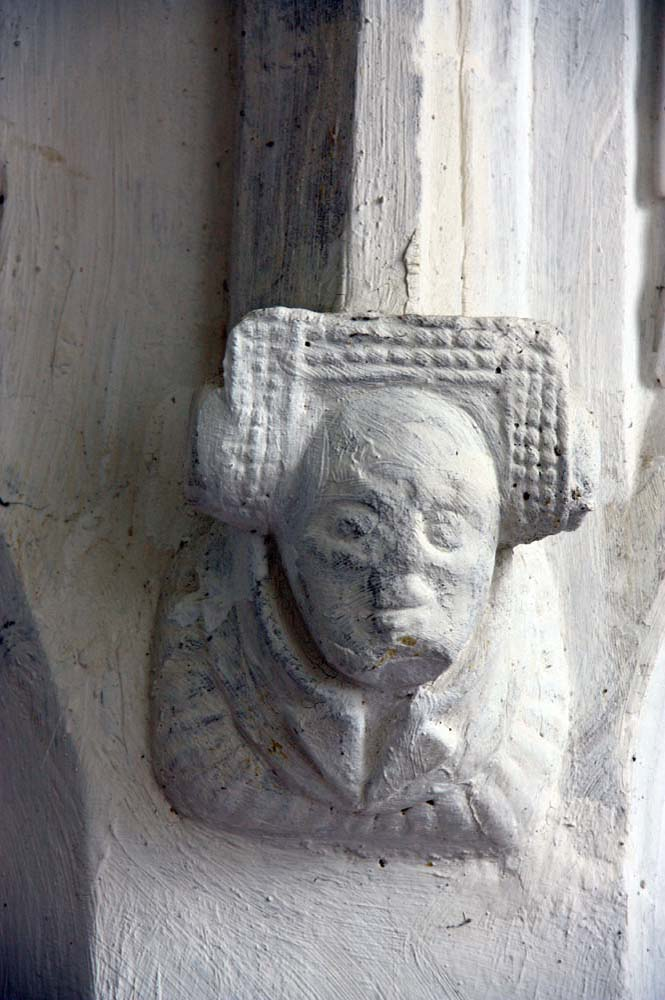
Vestry door, left hand hood stop

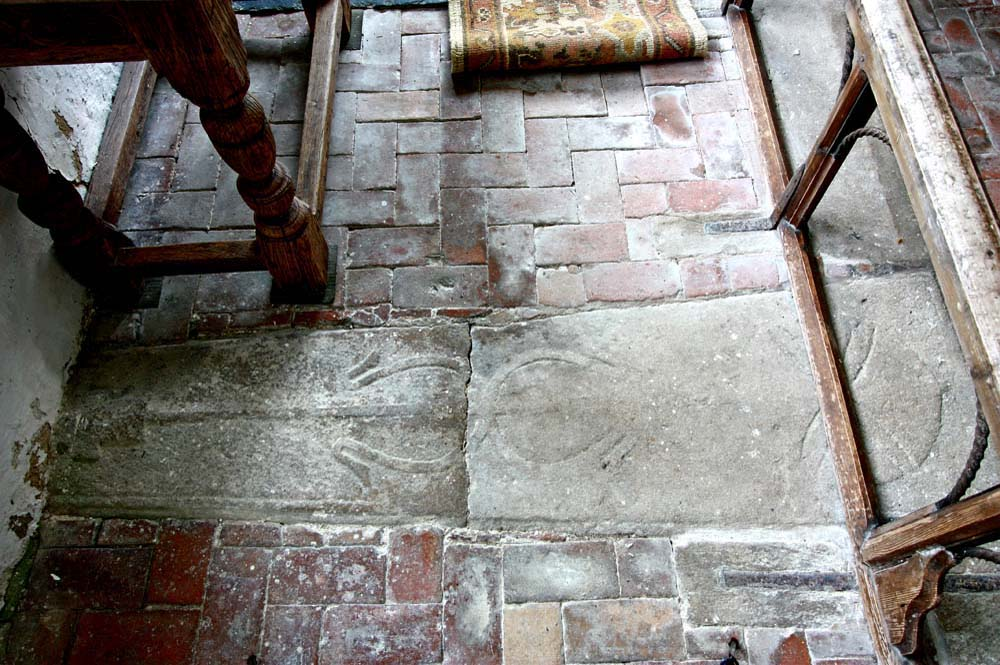
Medieval coffin slab

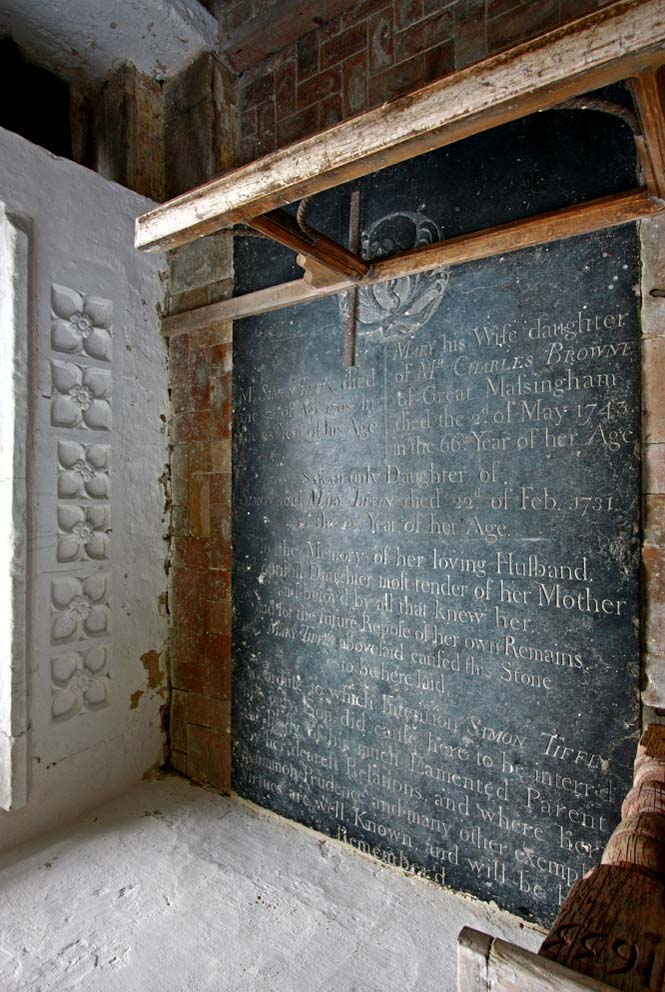
Tiffin memorial

== See also ==
- List of churches preserved by the Churches Conservation Trust in the East of England
