= Thomas Berney =

Thomas Berney may refer to:

- Sir Thomas Berney, 2nd Baronet (died 1693) of the Berney Baronets
- Sir Thomas Berney, 5th Baronet (died 1742) of the Berney Baronets
- Sir Thomas Reedham Berney, 10th Baronet (1893–1975) of the Berney Baronets

== See also ==
- Tom Birney
- Berney (surname)
