= Richard Berney (disambiguation) =

Richard Berney MP for Norwich.

Richard Berney may also refer to:

- Sir Richard Berney, 1st Baronet (d. 1668) of the Berney baronets
- Sir Richard Berney, 3rd Baronet (d. 1706) of the Berney baronets
- Sir Richard Berney, 4th Baronet (1688–1710) of the Berney baronets

== See also ==
- Berney (surname)
