= Barton Bendish =

Village and a civil parish in the English county of Norfolk

Coordinates: 52.622°N 0.529°E

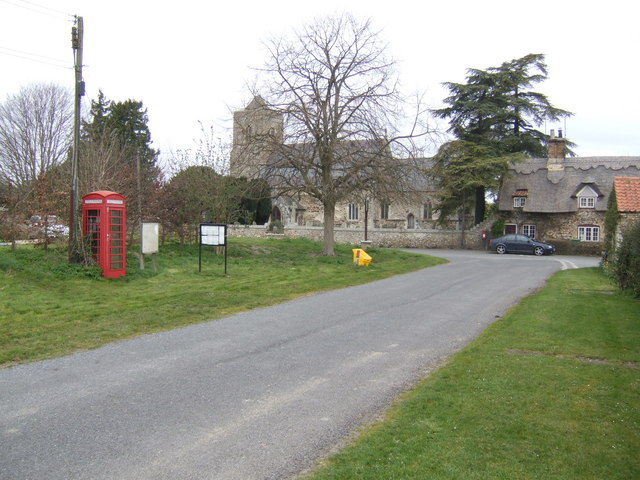
- Barton Bendish, St Andrew's Church with former Post Office

- Location within Norfolk
- Area: 15.92 km^{2} (6.15 sq mi)
- Population: 210 (parish, 2011 census)
  - Density: 13/km^{2} (34/sq mi)
- OS grid reference: TF712056
  - London: 101 miles (163 km)
- Civil parish: Barton Bendish
- District: King's Lynn and West Norfolk
- Shire county: Norfolk
- Region: East
- Country: England
- Sovereign state: United Kingdom
- Post town: KING'S LYNN
- Postcode district: PE33
- Dialling code: 01366
- Police: Norfolk
- Fire: Norfolk
- Ambulance: East of England

Barton Bendish is a civil parish and small village in the English county of Norfolk 10 miles (16 km) south of King's Lynn and 90 miles (140 km) northeast of London. It has two medieval parish churches, and once had three. The parish includes the hamlet of Eastmoor, and covers 3,936 acres (1,593 ha).

The village has been settled since Neolithic times and was expanded during the Saxon period. It had a population of 210 in the 2010 census and contains eight listed buildings, with the two medieval parishes churches being Grade I.

== Geography ==
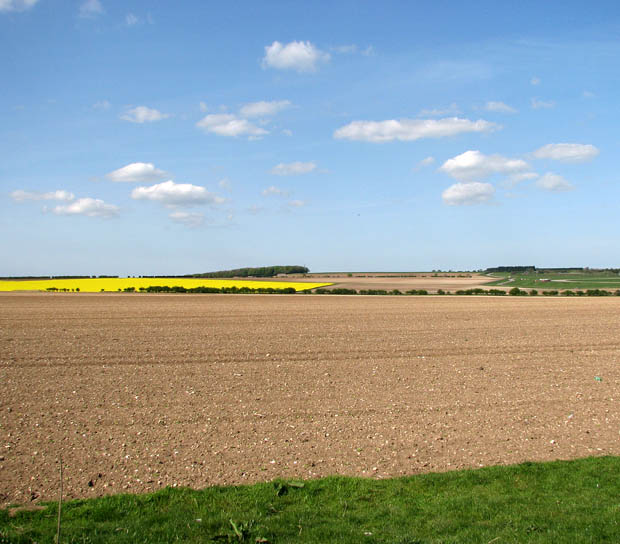
Barton Bendish parish, landscape from A1122

The civil parish has an area of 15.92 square kilometres (6.15 sq mi), and in the 2011 census had a population of 210 in 96 households. Its territory comprises slightly rolling countryside and is defined by two small valleys, the brooks of which form the boundaries of the southern part of the parish. The western one is called the Lode Dyke, and the eastern one the Stringside Stream. They unite at the parish's southernmost tip, to flow into the River Wissey.

The underlying geology is chalk, but the two boundary valleys have brickearth from the Anglian glaciation. This has affected land use. The northern part of the parish is entirely dominated by arable farming with no woodland, except for the northernmost portion which takes in part of RAF Marham airfield. However, the brickearth areas to the south has some woodland -the named woods are Birch Wood and Sluice Wood in the Stringside valley, and The Channels in the Lode Dyke valley. The latter is adjacent to Barton Bendish Fen, a former fenland common which has been drained but which is only under arable in its northern part.

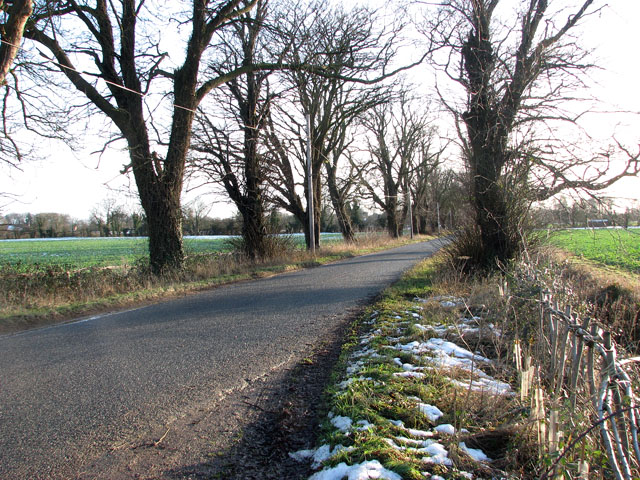
Barton Bendish's main connection to the outside world. Fincham Road.

The village is 7.6 miles (12.2 km) east of Downham Market, 38.6 miles (62.1 km) west of Norwich and 14.4 miles (23.2 km) south of the town of Kings Lynn. It is near the north-west border of the parish. In the south-east part of the latter is the separate scattered hamlet of Eastmoor, the only one in the parish territory.

The A1122 Swaffham to Downham Market road passes through the north tier of the parish, but the village is only accessible via country lanes. Fincham Road runs south from the A1122 east of Fincham, and turns north-east at a junction near the village as the Beachamwell Road. This re-joins the A1122 to access Swaffham, and also runs to Beachamwell to the east. The Boughton Long Road runs from the junction to Boughton and hence to Stoke Ferry and the A134 to Thetford. A narrow lane runs from Beachamwell Road to Oxborough to the south-east via Eastmoor. There is no direct route from the village to Marham to the north.

== Village layout ==
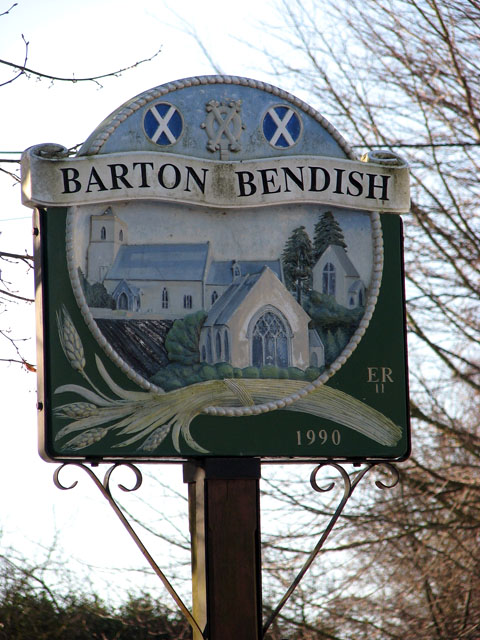
Barton Bendish village sign, featuring the three churches.

Barton Bendish is a settlement of scattered households where there are two churches which are little more than a field apart. What is more remarkable is that up until 1787 the parish had three churches. All Saints' Church was pulled down in that year, with much of the material used to repair local roads and for repairing St Mary's Church. The other remaining church is called St Andrew’s.

The settlement counts as a shrunken medieval village as it was much bigger in the Middle Ages, and still has three concentrations of settlement despite its small size.

=== Barton Bendish St Andrew ===
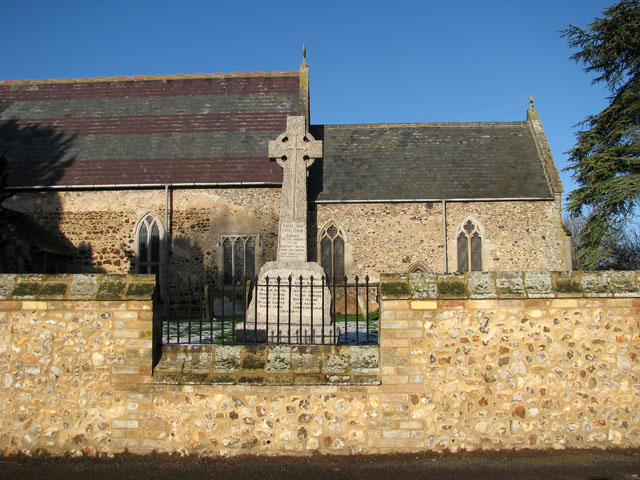
Barton Bendish War Memorial

The plan of the main built-up area, Barton Bendish St Andrew, is shaped like a mirrored F. Most buildings are along Church Road, a dead-end street running north-east from Fincham Road near its junction with Beachamwell Road. Buildings also line the former on its east side to the latter, and a street called Buttlands Lane connects Church Road and Beachamwell Road to the east.

The former school the stands on the south corner of the Church Road junction. On the left along Church Road before the Buttlands Lane junction is St Andrew's Church, which is a Grade I Listed building. Opposite the Buttlands Lane junction is the former Post Office, Grade II listed which is now a pair of semi-detached cottages beneath a single thatched roof and dated 1713. The walls are a chaotic mix of flint, ashlar rubble and red and yellow bricks. Down Buttlands Lane is a K6 phone box, Grade II listed. The single-storey building on the east side of the junction, with decorative brickwork, used to be the village shop in the 20th century. It's part of a larger pile called Hyde House which incorporates an older thatched building, and is the headquarters of Albanwise Ltd the owner of the Barton Bendish Estate.

Barton Bendish's War Memorial is located in the churchyard and is a Grade II listed Celtic cross in grey granite that was restored in 1977.

Further along Church Road is a former public house The Berney (formerly Berney Arms, before that Spread Eagle) and named for the former owners of Barton Hall, the Berney family. The pub closed in 2020. Opposite the pub is a village hall, and further down on the left is the old St Andrew's Rectory with a gable wall in a flint, ashlar rubble and red brick mix. This dates from 1725.

At the end of Church Road is a short private drive leading to Avenue House, a mid-18th century farmhouse which is Grade II listed. This is accompanied by an unusual domed ice-house with a vaulted entrance corridor, resembling an ancient Greek tholos tomb.

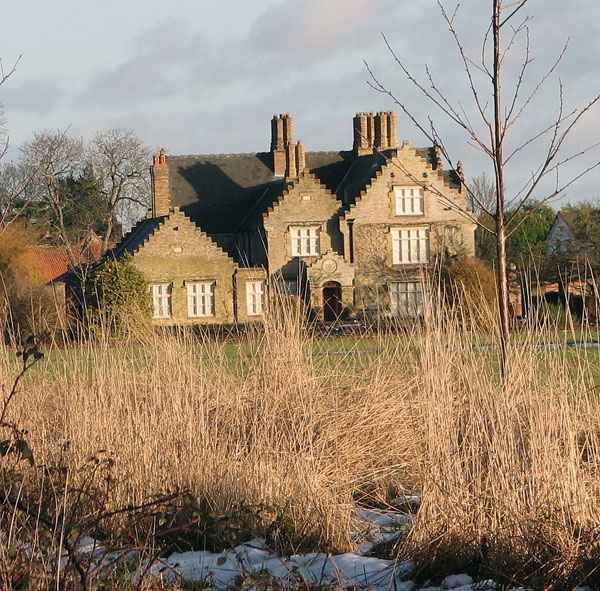
Barton Hall – west facade

The village contains a notable manor house, Barton Hall, which is Grade II listed and is the last survivor of five medieval village manors (there were four more in Eastmoor). There is a medieval moat to the east of the Hall, but it is uncertain as to whether this is the direct ancestor of the present building. Whatever, its site was first definitely developed in the 17th century, but the original house was almost entirely torn down and rebuilt in 1856, and the present structure is architecturally Victorian. The interior of the house was then extensively redone throughout the early and mid 20th century, meaning it retains little of its original artistic integrity, even from the Victorian period. Nevertheless, the house remains one of the more notable structures in the village, and the gardens have been developed by the current owner, Count Luca Padulli di Vighignolo, and are periodically opened to the public. Guided tours of the garden are occasionally offered on request. The dog kennels here are separately listed, Grade II. The five of them comprise a single-storey brick edifice with a black glazed pantile roof and an interesting set of cages in wrought iron. It was erected in 1853.

=== Barton Bendish All Saints ===
The churchyard of All Saints' Church continued in use for burials into the early 19th century after the church was demolished in 1789. The site of the church is on Church Road just before St Andrew's Church, and is now a house.

=== Barton Bendish St Mary ===
The other major focus of the village is Barton Bendish St Mary, which is to the west. It is aligned north to south, with St Mary's Church at the north with a triangular village green and a scatter of buildings along the Boughton Long Road.

=== East Barton Bendish ===
The village used to extend beyond its present eastern limits. To the north-east is a deserted moated site, a scheduled monument and the location of the medieval manor of East Hall. Earthworks belonging to its deserted medieval settlement are at Abbey Farm, and are also scheduled.

The only remnant of this former built-up area is a dead-end lane leading to Abbey Farm. and amounting to the village's third settlement focus. This settlement used to be called Cripple’s End. It used to have a Wesleyan Methodist chapel, and the village's first post office was just to the south of this in a low single-storey building. Both survive as private houses.

== History ==
Archaeological surveying of the parish by fieldwalking has been thorough, and has revealed that the territory has been well settled from Neolithic times. A Bronze Age hoard, now in the Ashmolean Museum, of eight bronze items was allegedly found in the parish at the turn of the 20th century, but the provenance is uncertain. Burials of this period have been found, and three ring ditches interpreted as ploughed-out round barrows have been identified on aerial photographs.

The population of the parish territory increased during the Iron Age, with at least three settlement sites which have been identified by pottery scatters. These sites also showed continuity into the later Roman period.

The A1122 to the east of Fincham follows the course of a Roman road that connected the Fen Causeway with Venta Icenorum (the present Caistor St Edmund). The outline of a Roman marching camp was identified on an aerial photograph, just north of The Channels wood and near one of the putative round barrows already mentioned.

=== Saxon and medieval development ===
Fieldwalking and archaeological excavations in the village have shown that the village was a dispersed settlement throughout the entire Anglo-Saxon period. Early Saxon settlements have been identified at Hill Farm and north-east of St Mary's Glebe Farm. Middle Saxon settlement was concentrated around the site of St Mary's Church, and in the Late Saxon period the west end of the present main village was a focus with settlement spreading eastwards.

The village's name derives from the Old English Bertuna binnan dic and means 'Barley farm within the ditch'. The name implies that the direction of Saxon settlement came from the west. The ditch concerned is the Devil's Dyke, a linear bank and ditch running in an almost straight line from Narborough to near Oxborough parallel to the present eastern boundary of the parish (it used to be the actual boundary), and this is postulated as an early Saxon boundary marker. The dating is not conclusive, however.

The village is mentioned in the Domesday Book of 1086, where the name is given as Bertuna in the Hundred of Clackclose. There were five manors. The main tenant of the village was William who held from Hermer de Ferrers, and other tenants were Reynald Fitzlvo and Ralph Baynard. Two churches are mentioned -it is uncertain as to which church is missing, or why. The consensus is that all three were founded in late Saxon times.

In the century after the Norman Conquest, the parish still had several small manors. West Dereham Abbey, a monastery of Premonstratensians founded in 1088, had interests at Eastmoor and maintained a chapel there. The locations of the manors of East Hall (the moated site north-east of Avenue Farm), Herne Hall (north end of Eastmoor hamlet, east of lane) and Capel Hall (in the main village at The Paddocks, excavated 1988) are known.

From the time of Richard I (1157–99) to Henry VIII (1491–1547) the Lovells were principal lords of the manor here, with their seat at the present Barton Hall. Thomas Lovell, the third son of Sir Ralf Lovell was a loyal supporter of Henry VII. He fought at the Battle of Bosworth 1485 and was knighted by Henry VII for his prowess. In 1485 he was created President of the Council and Chancellor of the Exchequer for life. His elder brother Sir Gregory was made banneret at Stoke. In the later Middle Ages, the Lowell family began the consolidation of land ownership in the parish by acquiring other manors.

=== 16th and 17th centuries ===
The Berney arms

Possession of the principal manor passed from the Lowells to the Gawdy family in 1579, and they kept it until 1677 when it passed to the Berney family who remained owners for almost 250 years. They completed the acquisition of the remaining manorial landholdings, to turn the parish into a single country estate centred on Barton Hall. The process involved a substantial reduction in the size of the village, with formerly built-up areas being abandoned.

=== 18th century ===
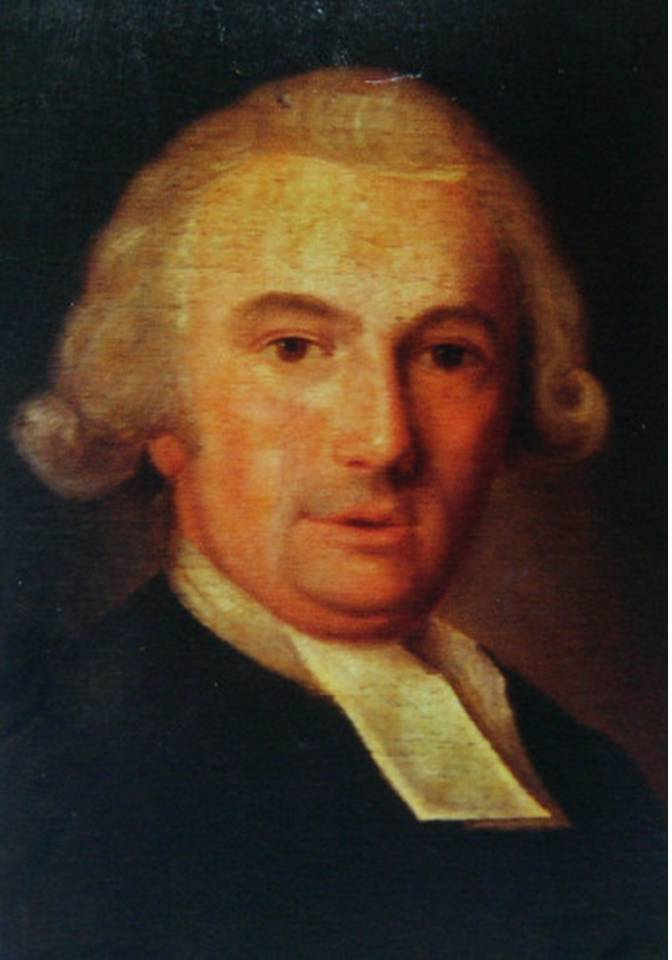
Robert Forby, village rector.

In 1710, the tower of St Mary's Church fell and destroyed the west end of its nave. The rest was patched up with the resultant rubble, but the church was only properly repaired in 1789. This was after All Saints' Church had been demolished in the previous year, making materials available. The parishes of these two churches had been united in 1787, allowing for the rationalisation -but this meant that the main village was still divided between two parishes.

Barton Bendish Inclosure Act 1774
- Act of Parliament
- Parliament of Great Britain
- Long title: An Act for dividing, allotting, and enclosing, the Old whole-year Lands, Common Fields, half-year Enclosures, Lammas Meadows, Heaths, Commons, and Waste Lands, within the Parish of Barton, otherwise Barton Bendish, or Eastmore, in the county of Norfolk.
- Citation: 14 Geo. 3. c. 59 Pr.
- Territorial extent: Great Britain

Dates
- Royal assent: 5 May 1774
- Commencement: 13 January 1774 (Note: Start of session.)

Status: Current legislation

In 1774, the parish was enclosed under the Barton Bendish Inclosure Act 1774 (14 Geo. 3. c. 59 Pr.), which provided for "dividing, allotting and inclosing the old whole year lands, common fields, half-year inclosures, Lammas meadows, heaths, commons and waste lands within the parish of Barton". So, the parish's landscape was radically altered and the open-field system and common land rights were extinguished. The tithes on farm income owing to the two working churches were commuted for new glebe land, which explains the names of St Andrew’s Glebe Farm and St Mary’s Glebe Farm. The ancient common land of Barton Bendish Fen was suppressed, and the poor of the parish were given the income from forty acres as compensation. The Poors Allotment survived as a charity which received rent from land to use as fuel subsidies for needy parishioners, until it was removed from the official list of the Charity Commission in 2017 owing to inactivity.

In 1783, the village school was founded when one Richard Jones bequeathed an endowment for the purpose. Something went wrong and the capital was lost, but the school survived through voluntary subscription and it became part of the National School System by 1811. The village pub, the Spread Eagle, is first mentioned in 1794.

In the Eighties of this century the noted philologist, botanist and clergyman Robert Forby was resident in the village, firstly as tutor to the Berney children at the Hall and then as head of a small private academy. As such, he taught the botanist Dawson Turner. As clergyman he held the benefices of Horningtoft and Barton Bendish St Mary's, and arranged the restoration of the latter church in 1789. He subsequently became rector of Fincham, where his name is better known.

=== 19th century ===
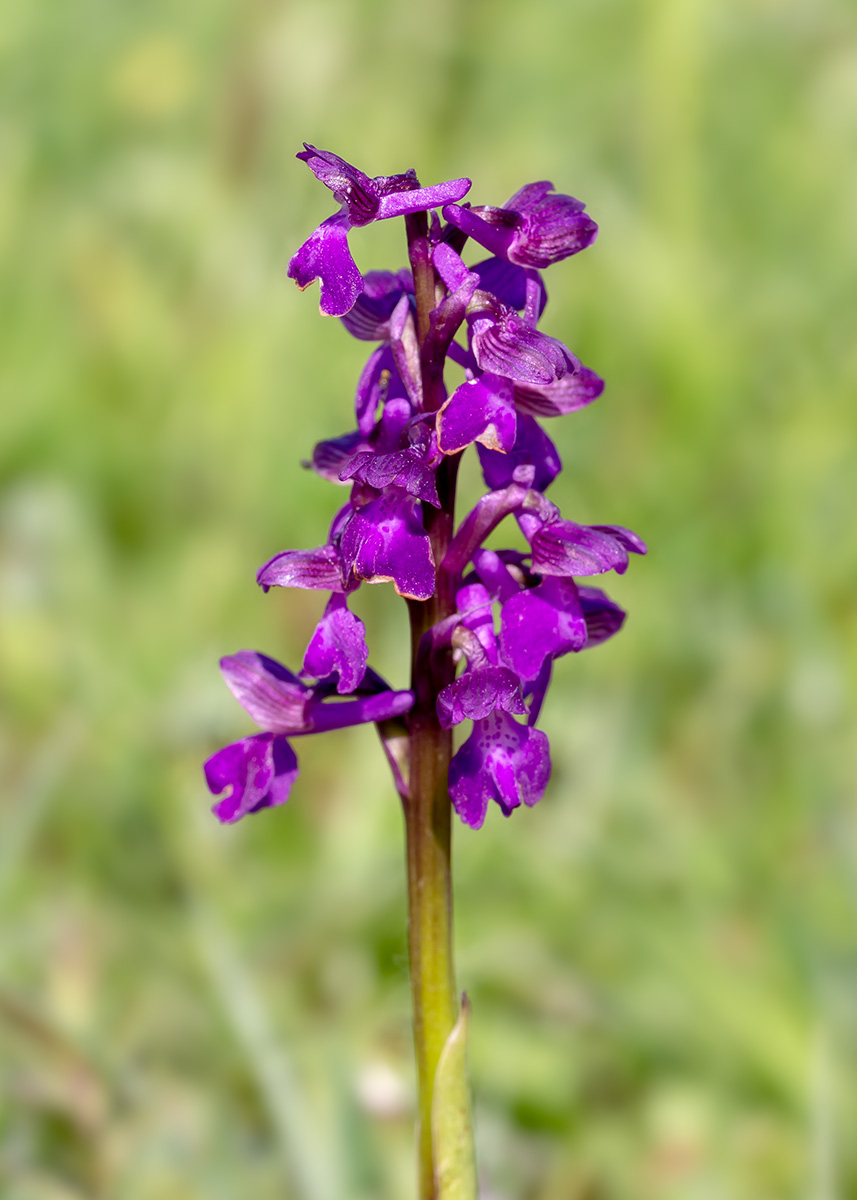
Green-winged Orchid, once common in the parish.

In 1811, the parish population was 459.

In 1841 the botanist George Munford published his list of flowering plants in western Norfolk, giving witness to the botanical richness then of the lost chalk grasslands of the parish. For example, to be found were bee orchids, fragrant orchids, pyramidal orchids and "plentiful" green-winged orchids.

In 1865 St Mary's Church was restored, and in 1871 a bell-cote was added to replace a Baroque bell-turret provided in 1789. The formerly thatched roof was re-done in slate.

In 1868 the thatched roof of St Andrew's Church also needed replacing, and again this was done in slate so as not to have to renew the thatch every half century as before. In 1874, a proper schoolhouse was built. In 1875 a Wesleyan Methodist chapel was erected in Cripple's End (now called Chapel Lane).

In 1871 the Spread Eagle pub was briefly renamed the Berney Arms, a name to be resurrected in the 21st century.

In 1881, the village population was 337 with a further 100 in Eastmoor – a loss of twelve in seventy years. As well as the pub, school and post office, there was also a shop, a coal merchant who farmed, a bootmaker and a blacksmith who was also a wheelwright who could shrink-fit iron tyres to cartwheels. The local public carrier did a round trip to King's Lynn in his cart on Tuesdays.

In 1885 the two parishes were finally united, and the Local Government Act 1894 set up the Parish Council which answered to Downham Rural District Council.

In 1899, another Wesleyan Methodist chapel was opened at Eastmoor.

=== 20th century ===
In 1929 the north-eastern boundary of the parish was moved westwards from the Devil's Dyke to the parallel lane known as Narborough Hill, so giving 190 acres (77 hectares) to the parish of Beachamwell.

RAF Barton Bendish was a Second World War airfield which operated for two years from September 1939. The location was just north-east of the wood called The Channels. The only surviving remnant is a polygonal brick-clad concrete pillbox up a farm track west of Eastmoor Lane (first right from the village).

In 1947, the Spread Eagle pub was bought by Truman's Brewery of London as a tied house. It was sold to the Brent Walker pubco in 1988.

The Berney family finally lost possession of the Estate just after the Second World War, and the subsequent owners oversaw the introduction of intensive farming. Tenancies of farms were terminated and farms amalgamated, with fields made bigger by removing some hedgerows, and pastureland was ploughed up for arable. Mechanisation reduced the need for farmworkers, and those farmworkers’ cottages surplus to requirements were demolished instead of being sold on. Albanwise Ltd purchased the Estate in 1992.

St Mary's Church became disused in 1967, and was formally made redundant in 1975. It was taken over by what is now called the Churches Conservation Trust and restored, with the roof being put back in thatch. Also in 1967 the post office and village shop merged as businesses, but this did not prove profitable and the combined retail outlet shut down for good a decade later. The school closed in 1974, owing to a lack of children.

In 1980/1 an archaeological excavation took place on the site of All Saints' Church, and this was followed up by another one across the road in 1988 when The Paddocks housing estate was started.

=== 21st century ===
The present owner of most of the parish farmland, Albanwise Ltd, a UK-based farming and real estate company – which is ultimately owned by the Vighignolo Investment Trust (a non for profit organization) - purchased the Barton Estate in 1992, and has ever since then invested to preserve the village historic significance and enhance the surrounding landscape.

The two Methodist chapels in the parish, at Chapel Lane and Eastmoor, have closed down to become private houses.

At the start of the century the Spread Eagle pub was sold as a free house, renamed the Berney Arms and became a high-standard gastropub with accommodation. As such it was one of the three finalists in the Eastern Daily Press Norfolk Best Pub & Restaurant Food Awards in 2006. Later it was rebranded as The Berney.

In 2010, a new variety of hybrid peony was brought out which was named Barton Bendish after the village.

In the same year the population of the parish was 210, less than half of what it was two centuries before.

In 2020, the pub closed down. It had been the last retail business in the village.

== Governance ==
For the purposes of local government, the parish falls within the district of King's Lynn and West Norfolk. The Parish Council advises higher powers on local matters such as highways and public services, and has a limited responsibility for such local amenities as exist.

The parliamentary constituency is South West Norfolk.

== Transport ==
The nearest railway station since 1930 is at Downham Market for the Fen Line which runs between Cambridge and King's Lynn. The closest used to be at Stoke Ferry, but it closed in that year.

The only bus service to/from the village is a Flexibus service operated by Vectare.

== Amenities ==
The main social amenity is the village hall, run by an independent charity.

Both remaining churches, St Andrew's and St Mary's are Grade I listed and so attract visitors. St Mary's Church is redundant and not used for regular worship (there are occasional liturgical services), and is now under the care of the Churches Conservation Trust.

A popular sport played in the village is bowls. The village bowling green was officially opened in 1952, although before that the game was played in front of Avenue House courtesy of Commander Mansfield. The green is situated on Fincham Road, opposite the junction with Church Road.

The parish has two phone boxes, the one in the village being Grade II listed. The one at Eastmoor was adopted by the Parish Council around 1998 in order to prevent its removal. It is accompanied by an interesting Victorian letter-box, set into the stone gable-wall of a semi-derelict outbuilding.

== Churches ==
=== St Andrew’s Church ===
St Andrew's parish church is the only place of regular worship left in the parish. It occupies a prominent site in the centre of the village.

=== St Mary’s Church ===
St Mary's Church is redundant, and is hidden away on a secluded site west of the main village. It is regularly open to visitors, and occasional liturgical services are held.

=== All Saints' Church ===
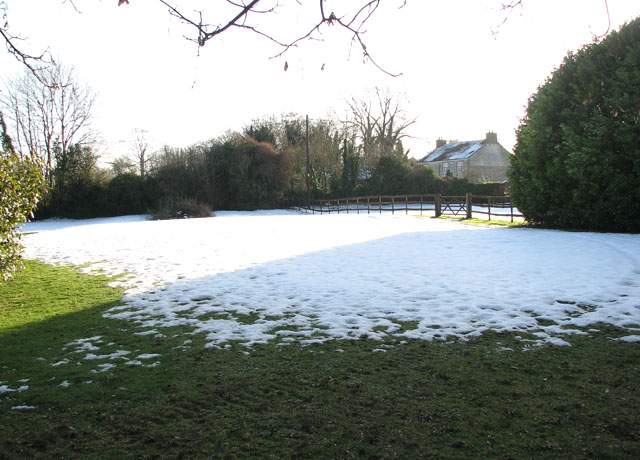
The site of All Saints Church, looking south. The nave was about where the gate is.

The third medieval parish church of the village was demolished in the 18th century, and no remains exist above ground. The location is in between the Old School and All Saints' House, nearer the former and with the nave just south of the car park there. In 1980-1 a thorough archaeological excavation was undertaken, which was the first of any ruined church in Norfolk. This revealed evidence of seven separate building campaigns for the church, as well as of Late Saxon settlement beforehand. A cemetery of this period pre-dated the first church on the site, and forty-nine graves of this were discovered.

Phase 1, the first church on site, was a small edifice 42.5 feet (13 metres) long, consisting of a nave separated from a chancel by a chancel arch. There was an apse, all three elements being of the same width of 14.75 feet (4.5 metres). The existence of large external buttresses flanking the apse indicated a date after 1066, and the apse one before c. 1150. Phase 2 involved the lengthening of the nave westwards, or a transverse rectangular tower added (the evidence didn't allow a firm choice of hypotheses, but the former was preferred). The Norman doorway now at St Mary's was concluded to be of this phase, about 1175–95. Phase 3 saw the demolition of the apse. Phase 4 (early 14th century) had the nave further lengthened westwards, and the chancel arch replaced by a wooden screen. There was a tiled roof at this phase, as tile fragments were found. Phase 5 involved the building of a western tower, and the extension of the chancel. Phase 6 had the addition of a large chapel to the north side of the nave. Tiled chancel and chapel flooring survived from this phase, involving green glazed and cream slip tiles in no particular pattern and of three different sizes. Phase 7 involved three large buttresses supporting the nave wall west of this chapel.

Francis Blomefield visited the church before 1752 (the year of his death), and left a brief description. The church roofing was in thatch, and the interior had a panelled ceiling vault. The north chapel had been demolished, but the piers separating it from the nave were left in the blocking wall. There was a rood screen. The tower had a brick parapet, a feature shared with St Andrew's across the road. Window had heraldic stained glass:

North window (a shield) gules, six escallops, argent, (heraldry of) Lord Scales; and, in the upper window, on the south side, (a shield) argent, on a bend, sable, three cross crosslets, fitchè of the first, (heraldry of) Caston.

He also recorded two other shields, of Bardolf Earl of Clare and of Burgh Earl of Ulster, but these had been lost by his visit. There were three bells in the tower, which he described

On the tenor: Sit Nomen Domini Benedictum (May the name of the Lord be blessed), and two shields; on one shield, two keys in saltire, between a dolphin embowed, a wheatsheaf, a bell, and a lamp, probably to represent the four elements; on the other shield, a quadrangular cross florette. On the second bell are the same shields, and Sancta Catherina Ora Nobis (St Catherine, pray for us). On the treble, the same shields, and Vox Augustini sonet in Aure Dei (The voice of Augustine sounds in the ear of God).

Surviving manuscript notes of the same period mention that the rood screen had defaced images of saints, there was an ambry in the east wall and a piscina in the chancel south wall. The east wall also had a heart-shaped plaque or brass with an engraving of a chalice on it.

The church fell into disrepair after Blomefield's visit. The Archdeacons’ Visitation Book of 1758 described the chancel as ruinous, and in 1764 it was demolished. In 1781 the roof had apparently collapsed, and the tower had fallen into ruin. Hence, by the time of the church's demolition it was already derelict.

In 1787 the parishes of All Saints and St Mary at Barton Bendish were united as one benefice, allowing for the disposal of one of the two churches. It was decided to demolish All Saints in 1788, to use some of its materials in the repair of St Mary's and sell the rest with the three bells to raise money for the restoration, which was overseen by Robert Forby the rector. During this process the 12th-century north doorway was salvaged in toto, moved from All Saints and set in the new west wall at St Mary's. The corresponding south doorway, "another arch of equal antiquity but less ornamented" was taken away to be a garden folly at the rectory of St Mary's, where it was "erected a little to the south of the house".

The bells ended up at Whitwell church in Reepham, where they remain.

The churchyard remained in use into the 19th century, with the last reference to it being in 1845. It wasn't formally deconsecrated (that would have required exhumations), but it was conveniently "forgotten about" and quietly expropriated in the mid 19th century.

=== Chapel of St Mary, Eastmoor ===
In the Norwich Diocesan Registers of 1314 a chapel dedicated to St Mary the Virgin in Marisco (i.e. in the Marsh) was first mentioned, with the patronage being in the hands of the Lovell family. The location was at TF 7265 0239, in the southern part of the scattered hamlet of Eastmoor.

At the Reformation the chapel was desecrated and became a farmhouse. Blomefield in the 18th century noted that the east part of the extant house seemed to be part of the chapel, but the house there now (called the Chapel Barn) is modern and there is nothing to see.

=== Chapel of St John ===
Blomefield, writing in the 18th century, identified the above chapel with one dedicated to St John the Baptist in Marisco which existed by 1188. An undated charter deeded it to West Dereham Abbey. If this was the same building, he could not explain the change in dedication. However, there is an alternative tentative identification with a location marked "Chapel (site of)" on the 1885 Ordnance Survey, at TF 7170 0600 near Abbey Farm. The Abbey held the freehold of a property here as well as the manor of Eastmoor.

=== Methodist Chapel, Chapel Lane ===
In 1875, a Wesleyan Methodist chapel was opened at Chapel Lane. It closed a century and a quarter later, and is now a private house. The single-storey building next to it was Barton Bendish's first post office.

The former chapel has a rectangular plan, including a slightly lower ancillary range attached to the back. The fabric is in yellow brick, with red brick quoins and window surrounds for the façade, and the roofs are in slate. There is an enclosed gabled external porch, a later addition which is very simple with its own slate roof. The façade behind has three large pointed windows, two tall ones flanking the porch and one shorter one above. A recessed date stone reading 1875 is in the gable. A pair of similar windows is in each side wall. The façade's corners have short stepped buttresses in stone, and the window arches are also in stone. The red brick quoins and window surrounds are laid to give a long-and-short pattern, like vertical crenelations. Interestingly, the buttresses are given pseudo-quoins in the same style.

=== Methodist Chapel, Eastmoor ===
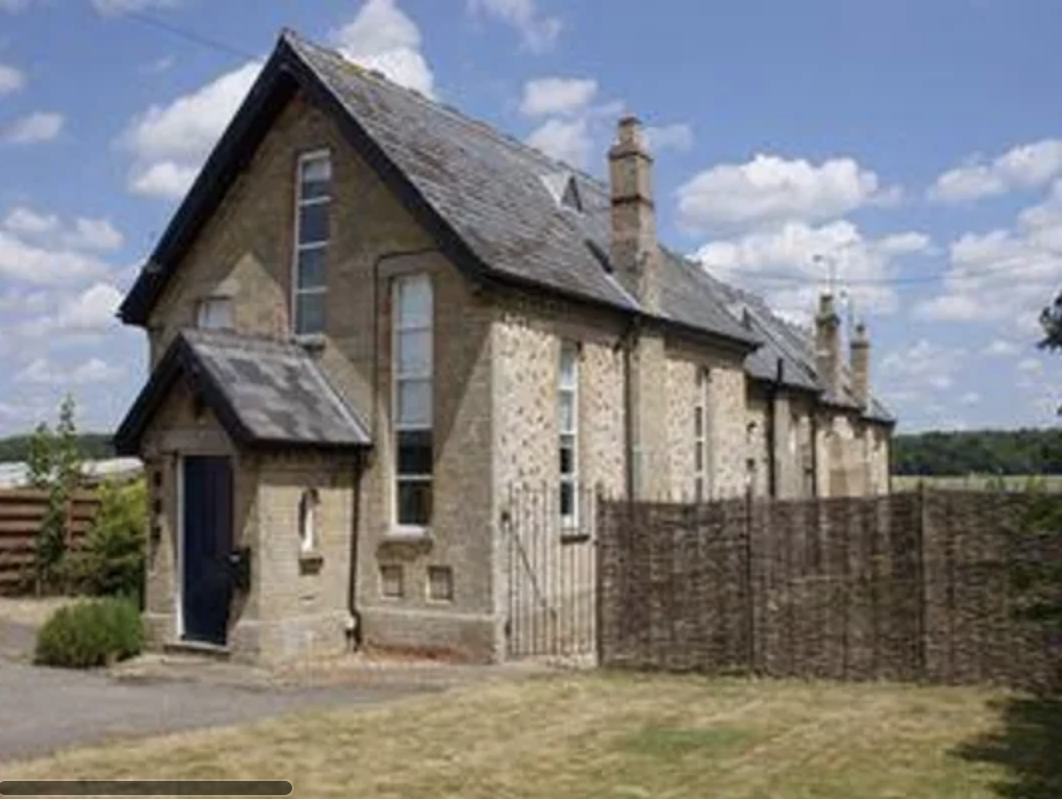
Former Methodist chapel at Eastmoor

In 1899, a Wesleyan Methodist chapel was also opened at Eastmoor. This was closed a century later, and is now a private house called The Old Chapel. The fabric has been substantially altered.

The chapel included a manse and schoolroom, and occupies a long rectangular plan set back from the road. The site slopes back, and the ancillary accommodation is under three separate roofs which step down in turn. The fabric is in yellow brick, and the roofs in grey slate. There is an enclosed gabled external front porch with its own slate roof, and a stone lintel over the door. In the façade are three tall rectangular strip windows. A pair of these flank the porch, and the third is above it. These windows are edged in red brick. The chapel side walls each have a pair of similar windows, and the right hand wall sports an external chimney. The third and fourth ranges behind each also have a chimney.

== Bibliography ==
- Office for National Statistics & Norfolk County Council (2001). Census population and household counts for unparished urban areas and all parishes. Retrieved 2 December 2005.
