= Robert Forby =

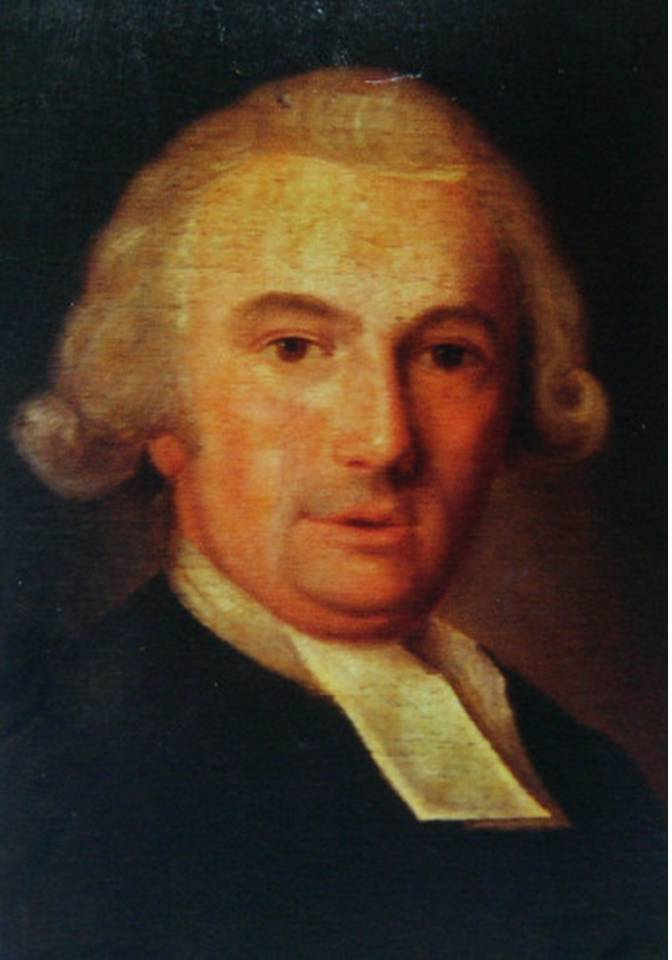
Portrait of Forby in the Norwich Castle Museum (c.1802), artist uncertain.

Robert Forby (1759–1825) was an English philologist.

== Career ==
Forby, born in 1759 of poor parents at Stoke Ferry, Norfolk, was educated at the free school of Lynn Regis, and at Caius College, Cambridge, where he obtained a fellowship (B.A. 1781, M.A. 1784). Sir John Berney, bart., induced him to leave the university, and to become tutor of his sons, presenting him in 1787 to the small living of Horningtoft, Norfolk. Afterwards he fixed his residence at Barton Bendish, where he took pupils; and on their number increasing, he removed to Wereham. Two years subsequently, in 1789, by the death of his uncle, the Rev. Joseph Forby, he came into possession of the valuable rectory of Fincham, Norfolk. He removed thither in 1801, and continued to reside in his parish till his death, which occurred suddenly while he was taking a warm bath, on 20 Sept. 1825, aged 66. He was elected a fellow of the Linnean Society in 1798, and was a distinguished scholar. At one time, though at what period is uncertain, he was resident at Aspall, Suffolk, as tutor to the children of Mr. Chevallier.

== Works ==
He published some small pieces of ephemeral interest, and an important philological work entitled The Vocabulary of East Anglia; an attempt to record the Vulgar Tongue of the twin sister counties, Norfolk and Suffolk, as it existed in the last twenty years of the Eighteenth Century, and still exists: with Proof of its Antiquity from Etymology and Authority, 2 vols. London, 1830, 8vo. This was edited by the Rev. George Turner of Kettleburgh. Prefixed to vol. i. is the author's portrait, engraved from a painting by M. Sharp. Vol. iii., being a supplementary volume by the Rev. William Tylney Spurdens, was published at London in 1858. Later, Spurdens would claim that he supplied most of the information used by Forby.

Forby also assisted Mr. Mannings in his "Pursuits of Agriculture", and in 1824 wrote the prospectus of a continuation of, as supplement to, the new edition of Blomefield's Norfolk.
