= RAF Barton Bendish =

Former RAF station in Norfolk, England

RAF Barton Bendish
- Norwich, Norfolk in England

Site information
- Type: Royal Air Force station
- Owner: Air Ministry
- Operator: Royal Air Force
- Controlled by: RAF Bomber Command

Location
- Shown within Norfolk
- Coordinates: 52°36′30″N 000°32′47″E

Site history
- Built: 1939
- In use: 1939-1942
- Battles/wars: European theatre of World War II

Airfield information
- Elevation: 14 metres (46 ft) AMSL

RAF Barton Bendish was an airfield for the Royal Air Force located on the far side of the Downham Market to Swaffham road from its parent station, RAF Marham. It was built because at the outbreak of the Second World War it was considered important for bomber stations to have a satellite airfield. The only aircraft known to have operated out of Barton Bendish were Vickers Wellington bombers from Marham. It was abandoned in 1942, as it was considered too close to the parent station to be developed further.

- No. 26 Squadron RAF.
- No. 268 Squadron RAF.

== See also ==
- List of former Royal Air Force stations
