= Carrstone =

Sedimentary sandstone conglomerate formed during the Cretaceous period

Carrstone (or carstone, also known as Silsoe, heathstone, ironstone, honeystone or gingerbread) is a sedimentary sandstone conglomerate formed during the Cretaceous period. It varies in colour from light to dark rusty ginger. Used as a building stone it can be found in Bedfordshire, Cambridgeshire and extensively in the historic buildings of northwest Norfolk.

Carrstone can vary in quality depending on factors such as the degree of iron oxide present, and sufficient pressure to form the matrix. Carrstone can also phase into puddingstone, ferricrete and silver carr. Because of its variations it does not lend itself to carving or finer work. Carrstonework can be seen in forms such as: random carrstone, coursed carrstone, ashlared carrstone, all with, or without, galleting. Other patterns of use are: rough carrstone sipps (slips, shale or brickettes) and cut carrstone sipps, both used in masonry fields between brickwork quoins.

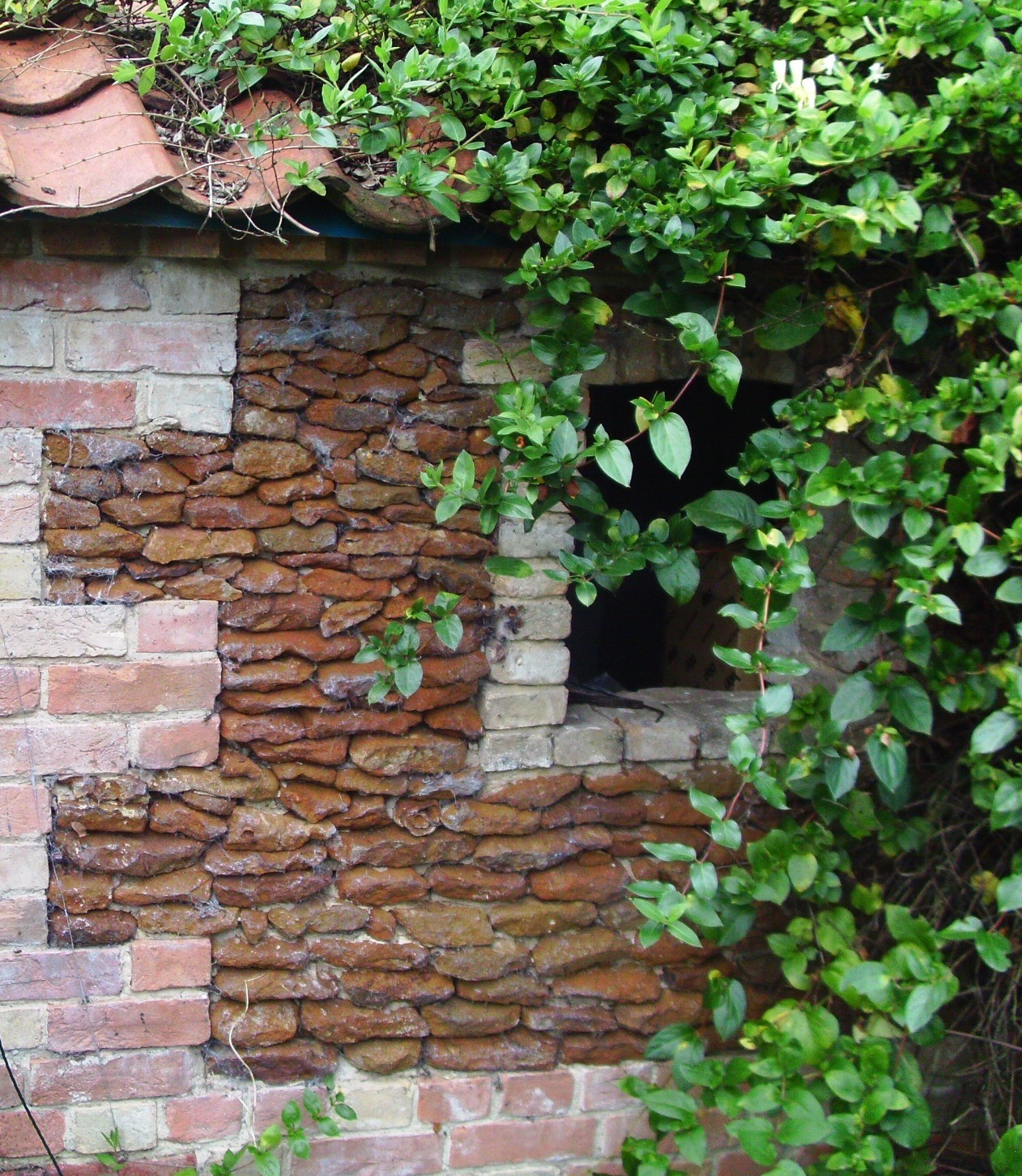
Carrstone used in construction

Cut carrstone sipps or shales are used extensively at Sandringham House on the main building and the stables block. Other examples of carrstone work can be found on St Mary's Church, Barton Bendish as well as many other parish churches in the region. Hunstanton and Wolferton feature some interesting examples along with the 'Gingerbread Town' of Downham Market, notably the Grade II listed Downham Market railway station.

Due to easy access to river transport, Carrstone can occasionally be found outside this region in such places as Great Bentley Church, Colchester, Essex.

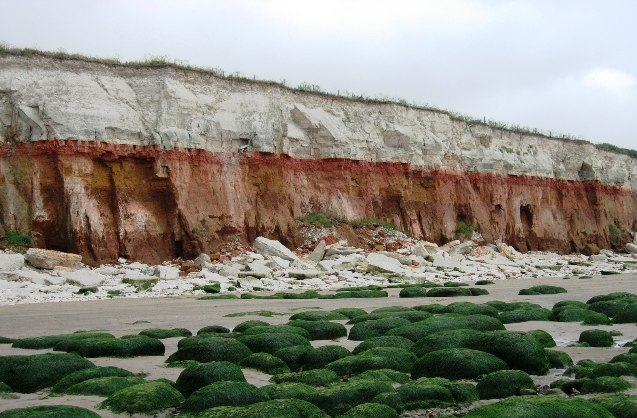
Carrstone in the cliffs at Hunstanton

== Petrography of carrstone formation ==
Ferruginous sandstone with detrital framework grains. Quartz dominated with subordinate feldspar, glauconite and sporadic phosphatic grains.

== Silver carr ==
Silver carrstone is, by comparison to ginger carrstone, rare. It is quarried alongside ginger and some even rarer pieces display both colours. The stone is a concretion which was generally quarried at Castle Rising woods, Norfolk. Many of the buildings in Castle Rising, Hillington and Flitcham have examples of silver carr used as a building material. Due to the proximity of the river, the stone was transported to other locations such as Burgh Castle, Norfolk.

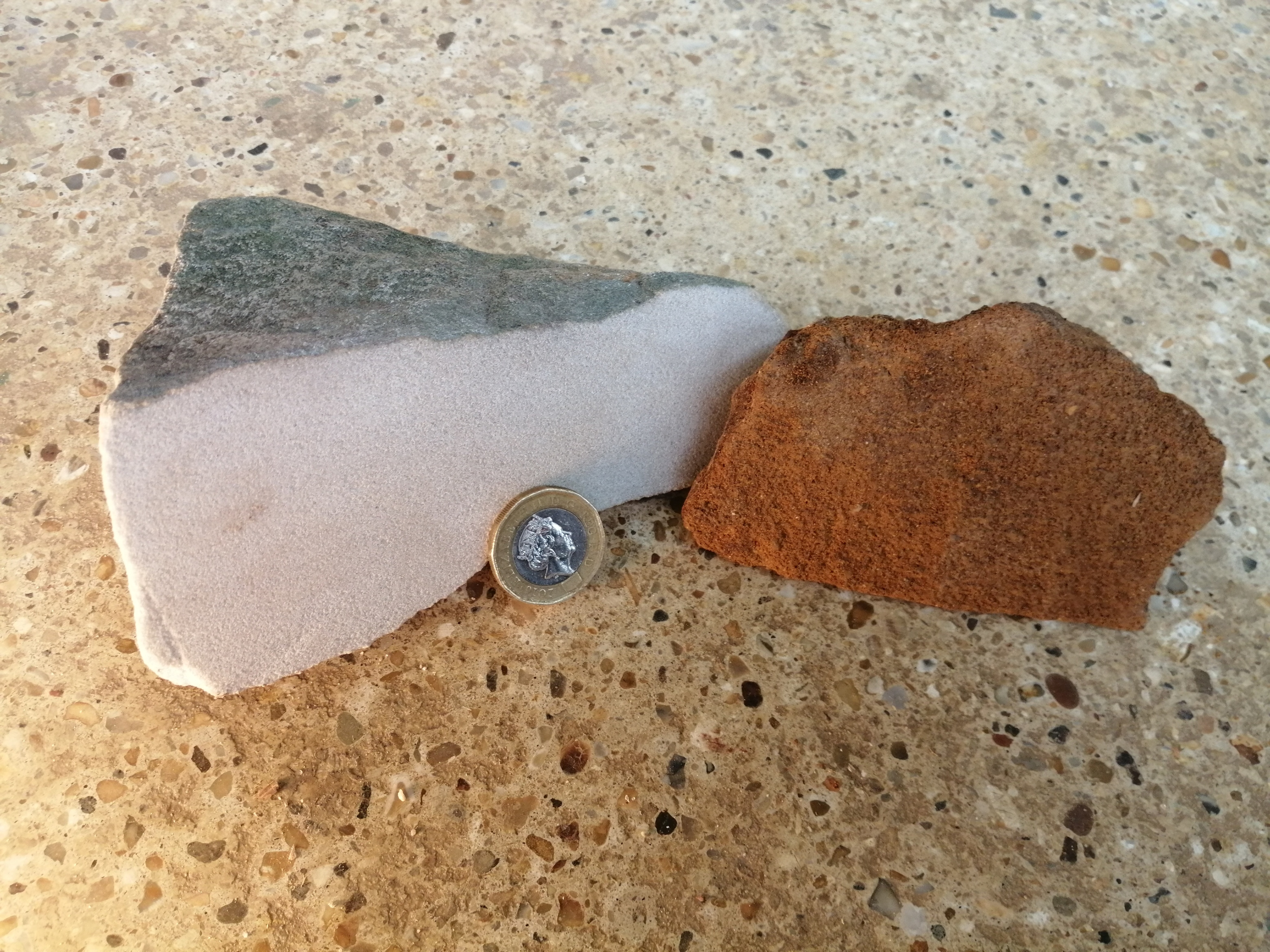
Silver carrstone alongside ginger carrstone

== Carrstone iron ore ==
East Anglia has had only four workable pockets for iron production. The Carrstone found in Norfolk at Ashwicken and West Runton was considered viable for iron smelting by the Romans. There is also evidence of smelting carrstone in the 14th century at Blakeney Chapel. These were nodular ores which were burnt by the direct method with charcoal in a bloomery furnace with forced air; the iron bloom was taken from the furnace as a spongy mass which was filled with unwanted impurities, these were worked (wrought) out by hand to produce wrought iron.

== Carrstone quarries ==
Historically, there have been numerous carrstone quarries along the Carrstone belt. Snettisham Carrstone quarry in Norfolk is still active and produces high iron content building stone.

== Conservation of carrstone buildings ==
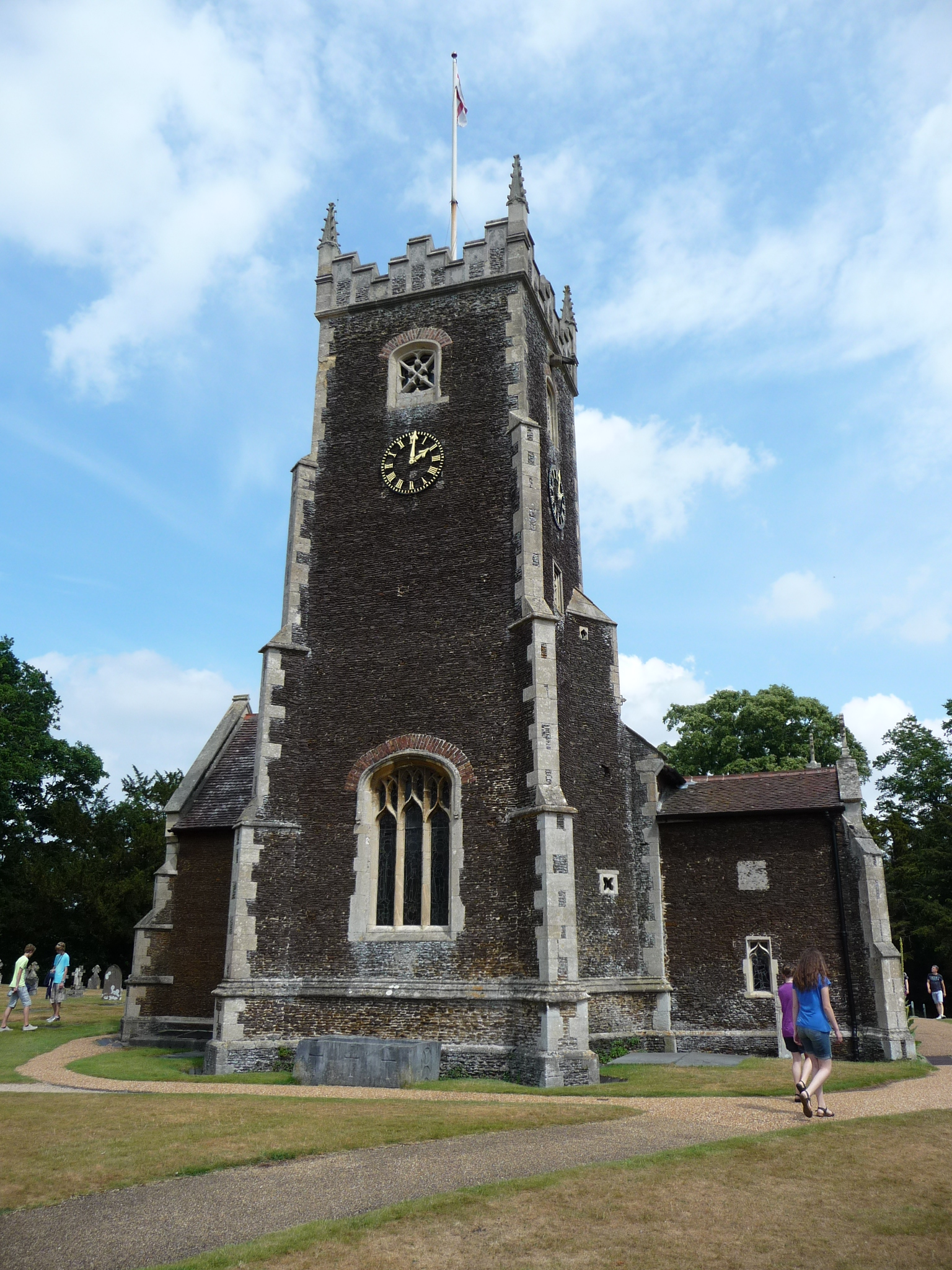
St Mary Magdalene Church, Sandringham, considered a noteworthy example of a carrstone building

Carrstone, as with many other building stones, is vulnerable to decay. There are many factors which influence the life of carr building stone such as the bedding mortar, moisture control and orientation of stone. Appearance of carr building stone can also be affected by factors such as mortar colour, mortar inclusions, stone shade, orientation in the wall, galletting and shapes of stone.

== Construction methods ==
Carrstone can be used in much the same way as any other building stone, but with the disadvantages of friability and of being more difficult to cut by hand. Whilst the stone is used as a single leaf for newbuild to reflect the more vernacular buildings, it is more common to see traditional methods of construction which involve an inner and outer leaf with a rubble core fill.

This type of wall is referred to as 'solid wall construction', but this is a misleading description due to the two leaves and core fill having different properties from a true solid wall, which is more susceptible to condensation and other damp mechanisms such as penetrating and rising damp.
