= Berney baronets =

Title in the Baronetage of England

Berney Baronetcy
- Quarterly gules and azure over all a cross engrailed ermine
- Creation date: 5 May 1620
- Created by: James I
- Baronetage: Baronetage of England
- First holder: Richard Berney
- Present holder: Sir Julian Berney, 11th Baronet
- Heir apparent: William Berney
- Status: Extant
- Former seats: Park Hall; Barton Bendish Hall
- Motto: Nil temere, neque timore ("Nothing with rashness or fear")

The Berney Baronetcy, of Park Hall in Reedham in the County of Norfolk, is a title in the Baronetage of England. It was created on 5 May 1620 for Richard Berney, Sheriff of Norfolk in 1622.

== Family history ==
The Berney (Barney) name comes from that place which is in the hundred of North Greenhow, Norfolk, and is recorded as Berlej in the Domesday Book. The family can be traced back to Sir Thomas de Berney, who in the reign of Edward III, acquired the manor of Reedham through his marriage with Margaret, daughter and heir of William de Reedham. His descendant Henry Berney (died 1584) moved the family seat from near Reedham Church, and built Reedham Hall within a park. It was also known as Park Hall. It was sold in 1696 and gutted in a fire in 1750.

Henry's eldest son, Sir Richard Berney, was Sheriff of Norfolk in 1610. He married Juliana, daughter of judge Sir Thomas Gawdy of Redenhall. Their son Sir Richard Berney, 1st Baronet (died 1668) was created a baronet in 1620. Another son Thomas Berney was High Sheriff of Norfolk in 1647 and the ancestor of the Berneys of Morton Hall in Broadland, Norfolk.

The 1st Baronet married Anne Smallpage of Chichester. He left all his estates in Reedham not to his eldest son and heir, the second Baronet, but to his second son, Richard.

The 6th Baronet was Sheriff of Norwich in 1762.

The 7th Baronet, Sir John Berney, married Lady Henrietta Neville, daughter of George Neville, 1st Earl of Abergavenny in 1779.

The 8th Baronet, Sir Hanson Berney, oversaw the renovation and extension of Barton Bendish Hall, the family seat. Designed by James & Turner of Norwich, the existing east wing was renovated and the south-west double wing was added in 1865. Sir Hanson also established the village pub known today as The Berney Arms.

Sir Henry Hanson Berney, 9th Baronet, married Jane Dorothy Bloxam, daughter of the Rev. Andrew Bloxam. Lady Berney survived her husband, dying in December 1921. Amongst her mourners was her daughter, Mrs H.D. Middleton and her grandson, Sir Thomas Reedham Berney, 10th Baronet, the baronetcy having passed to him following the death of his father, Captain Thomas Hugh Berney, 2nd West Yorkshires in the Second Boer War. His son John Reedham Erskine Berney married Hon. Jean Davina Stuart, daughter of James Stuart, 1st Viscount, on 27 July 1951. John Reedham Erskine Berney died on 24 July 1952 at age 23 at Korea, killed in action. The 10th Baronet died in 1975.

== Berney Baronets, of Parkehall (1620) ==
- Sir Richard Berney, 1st Baronet (died 1668)
- Sir Thomas Berney, 2nd Baronet (died 1693)
- Sir Richard Berney, 3rd Baronet (died 1706)
- Sir Richard Berney, 4th Baronet (1688–1710)
- Sir Thomas Berney, 5th Baronet (died 1742)
- Sir Hanson Berney, 6th Baronet (died 1778)
- Sir John Berney, 7th Baronet (1757–1825)
- Sir Hanson Berney, 8th Baronet (1780–1870)
- Sir Henry Hanson Berney, 9th Baronet (1843–1907)
  - Thomas Hugh Berney (died 1900)
- Sir Thomas Reedham Berney, 10th Baronet (1893–1975)
- Sir Julian Reedham Stuart Berney, 11th Baronet (born 1952)

The heir apparent to the baronetcy is William Reedham John Berney (born 1980), eldest son of the 11th Baronet.
