= Grade II* listed buildings in King's Lynn and West Norfolk =

There are over 20,000 Grade II* listed buildings in England. This page is a list of these buildings in the district of King's Lynn and West Norfolk in Norfolk.

== King's Lynn and West Norfolk ==
Name	Location	Type	Completed (Note: The date given is the date used by Historic England as significant for the initial building or that of an important part in the structure's description.)	Date designated	Grid ref. (Note: The grid reference is based on the British national grid reference system, sometimes known as OSGB36, used by the Ordnance Survey.) Geo-coordinates	Entry number (Note: The "List Entry Number" is a unique number assigned to each listed building and scheduled monument by Historic England.)	Image
Church of St. Mary	Anmer	Parish Church	14th century	5 June 1953	TF7378829502; 52°50′06″N 0°34′43″E	1077863	Church of St. Mary More images
Church of All Saints	Barmer, Bagthorpe with Barmer	Parish Church	12th century	5 June 1953	TF8091433624; 52°52′11″N 0°41′11″E	1077802	Church of All Saints More images
Ruins of Church of St Michael	Bawsey	Parish Church	12th century	19 October 1951	TF6570019200; 52°44′42″N 0°27′12″E	1342379	Ruins of Church of St Michael More images
Church of All Saints	Bircham Newton, Bircham	Parish Church	Earlier	5 June 1953	TF7695033856; 52°52′23″N 0°37′40″E	1077805	Church of All Saints More images
Church of All Saints	Boughton	Parish Church	Early 19th century	8 July 1959	TF6999302220; 52°35′28″N 0°30′29″E	1342335	Church of All Saints More images
Church of St Mary	Burnham Deepdale, Brancaster	Parish Church	12th century	5 June 1953	TF8044644307; 52°57′57″N 0°41′07″E	1237969	Church of St Mary More images
Staithe House	Brancaster Staithe, Brancaster	Merchants House	Second quarter of 18th century	5 June 1953	TF7904244259; 52°57′57″N 0°39′52″E	1274478	Upload Photo
Burnham Westgate Hall	Burnham Market	Country House	pre 1783	5 June 1953	TF8300442161; 52°56′44″N 0°43′20″E	1274350	Burnham Westgate Hall More images
Church of All Saints	Burnham Ulph, Burnham Market	Parish Church	pre 1200	5 June 1953	TF8355042251; 52°56′46″N 0°43′49″E	1238876	Church of All Saints More images
Market House and Lime Tree House	Burnham Market	House	17th century	5 June 1953	TF8321642181; 52°56′45″N 0°43′31″E	1238590	Market House and Lime Tree House More images
Detached Gable Wall, Friary Ruins	Burnham Norton	Carmelite Friary	14th century	5 June 1953	TF8382642777; 52°57′03″N 0°44′05″E	1238878	Detached Gable Wall, Friary Ruins More images
Windmill	Burnham Overy Staithe, Burnham Overy	House	1816	1 March 1985	TF8377043751; 52°57′35″N 0°44′04″E	1273832	Windmill More images
Tudor Lodgings and Attached Service Wing/cottage	Castle Acre	House	C20	15 August 1960	TF8180714974; 52°42′07″N 0°41′22″E	1077685	Upload Photo
Market Cross	Castle Rising	Market Cross	15th century	19 October 1951	TF6654224860; 52°47′44″N 0°28′07″E	1342437	Market Cross More images
Church of Saint Margaret	Clenchwarton	Parish Church	14th century	11 August 1951	TF5894220210; 52°45′22″N 0°21′14″E	1237110	Church of Saint Margaret More images
Church of St Andrew	Congham	Parish Church	13th century	15 August 1960	TF7128423660; 52°47′00″N 0°32′18″E	1342438	Church of St Andrew More images
Church of St Mary	Crimplesham	Parish Church	12th century	8 July 1959	TF6553103729; 52°36′22″N 0°26′35″E	1077765	Church of St Mary More images
Church of St Mary	Denver	Parish Church	Late 13th century	9 July 1951	TF6145501646; 52°35′19″N 0°22′55″E	1342310	Church of St Mary More images
Denver Hall	Denver	House	c. 1520	9 July 1951	TF6158301559; 52°35′16″N 0°23′01″E	1342309	Denver Hall
Gatehouse 20 Metres North of Denver Hall	Denver	Coat of Arms	1570	9 November 1984	TF6158101576; 52°35′17″N 0°23′01″E	1077847	Upload Photo
Denver Windmill	Denver	Tower Mill	1835	9 July 1951	TF6050401211; 52°35′06″N 0°22′04″E	1077850	Denver Windmill More images
Church of St Mary the Virgin	Docking	Parish Church	14th century	5 June 1953	TF7652736976; 52°54′04″N 0°37′23″E	1077811	Church of St Mary the Virgin More images
Church of St Mary	East Rudham	Parish Church	11th century	5 June 1953	TF8274228274; 52°49′16″N 0°42′38″E	1077780	Church of St Mary More images
Remains of St Mary's Priory	Coxford, East Rudham	Augustinian Monastery	13th century	5 June 1953	TF8481429021; 52°49′37″N 0°44′30″E	1152495	Remains of St Mary's Priory More images
Church of All Saints	East Winch	Parish Church	14th century	15 August 1960	TF6909416257; 52°43′03″N 0°30′07″E	1342382	Church of All Saints More images
Church of St Cecilia	West Bilney, East Winch	Parish Church	14th century	15 August 1960	TF7170315356; 52°42′31″N 0°32′25″E	1077671	Church of St Cecilia More images
Fincham Hall	Fincham	Manor House	c. 1500	26 April 1985	TF6944306500; 52°37′47″N 0°30′08″E	1152126	Fincham Hall
Church of St Mary	Flitcham, Flitcham with Appleton	Parish Church	11th century	15 August 1960	TF7250626627; 52°48′35″N 0°33′29″E	1168565	Church of St Mary More images
Church of St Mary	Fordham	Parish Church	Late 13th century	9 July 1951	TL6165799640; 52°34′14″N 0°23′02″E	1205531	Church of St Mary More images
Snore Hall	Fordham	House	Mid 15th century	9 July 1951	TL6239899316; 52°34′03″N 0°23′41″E	1280674	Upload Photo
Church of All Saints	Fring	Parish Church	14th century	5 June 1953	TF7354134868; 52°53′00″N 0°34′40″E	1304672	Church of All Saints More images
Church of All Saints	Hilgay	Parish Church	Early 13th century	8 July 1959	TL6225498114; 52°33′24″N 0°23′31″E	1077719	Church of All Saints More images
Wood Hall	Hilgay	House	1579	9 July 1951	TL6294497481; 52°33′03″N 0°24′07″E	1077724	Wood Hall More images
Church of St Mary	Hillington	Parish Church	15th century	15 August 1960	TF7231825221; 52°47′49″N 0°33′16″E	1306957	Church of St Mary More images
Village Cross	Hockwold cum Wilton	Village Cross	Early 14th century	8 July 1959	TL7346488007; 52°27′45″N 0°33′07″E	1306861	Village Cross More images
Houghton Hall South Lodges with Gates, Gate Piers and Walls attached	New Houghton, Houghton	Gate Lodge	c. 1730	9 October 1985	TF7908227789; 52°49′04″N 0°39′22″E	1153105	Houghton Hall South Lodges with Gates, Gate Piers and Walls attached More images
Smithdon High School including Main Block Water Tower Workshops and Kitchens	Hunstanton	School	1950-1954	30 March 1993	TF6786740573; 52°56′11″N 0°29′47″E	1077909	Smithdon High School including Main Block Water Tower Workshops and Kitchens More images
Gymnasium at Smithdon High School	Hunstanton	Gymnasium	Post 1954	30 March 1993	TF6780640536; 52°56′10″N 0°29′44″E	1342261	Upload Photo
Church of All Saints and Saint Michael	Ingoldisthorpe	Parish Church	14th century	5 June 1953	TF6906932756; 52°51′57″N 0°30′37″E	1342280	Church of All Saints and Saint Michael More images
Ingoldisthorpe Hall	Ingoldisthorpe	Country House	1757	5 June 1953	TF6875232537; 52°51′50″N 0°30′19″E	1077868	Upload Photo
Church of All Saints	Ashwicken, Leziate	Parish Church	13th century	15 August 1960	TF6983718841; 52°44′26″N 0°30′52″E	1077644	Church of All Saints More images
Remains of Abbey of SS. Mary, Barbara and Edmund	Marham	Abbey	1249	8 July 1959	TF7072109810; 52°39′33″N 0°31′22″E	1304912	Upload Photo
Church of St Mary	Middleton	Parish Church	13th century	15 August 1960	TF6626815989; 52°42′58″N 0°27′36″E	1077646	Church of St Mary More images
Village Cross	Northwold	Village Cross	Late 14th century	8 July 1959	TL7496897336; 52°32′45″N 0°34′44″E	1306081	Upload Photo
Chapel of St Andrew	Barret Ringstead, Old Hunstanton	Chapel ruin	13th century	5 June 1953	TF6836839938; 52°55′50″N 0°30′13″E	1077919	Chapel of St Andrew More images
The Octagon	Hunstanton Park, Old Hunstanton	Garden Building	c. 1640	5 June 1953	TF6917441631; 52°56′43″N 0°30′59″E	1171881	Upload Photo
Church of St Andrew	Ringstead	Parish Church	c. 1300	5 June 1953	TF7057840669; 52°56′11″N 0°32′12″E	1171984	Church of St Andrew More images
Church of All Saints	Roydon	Parish Church	13th century	15 August 1960	TF6991323656; 52°47′01″N 0°31′05″E	1077627	Church of All Saints More images
Church of St Andrew	South Runcton, Runcton Holme	Parish Church	Early 12th century	8 July 1959	TF6352208938; 52°39′13″N 0°24′58″E	1342289	Church of St Andrew More images
Church of St Michael	Ryston	Parish Church	12th century	9 July 1951	TF6209501756; 52°35′22″N 0°23′29″E	1077857	Church of St Michael More images
Ryston Hall	Ryston	Country House	1669-72	9 July 1951	TF6254801148; 52°35′02″N 0°23′52″E	1205569	Ryston Hall More images
Church of St Mary the Virgin	Bexwell, Ryston	Parish Church	14th century	9 July 1951	TF6314003409; 52°36′14″N 0°24′27″E	1077855	Church of St Mary the Virgin More images
Church of St Mary Magdalene	Sandringham	Parish Church	Medieval	15 August 1960	TF6911928592; 52°49′42″N 0°30′32″E	1077615	Church of St Mary Magdalene More images
Church of St Peter	Wolferton, Sandringham	Parish Church	c. 1300	15 August 1960	TF6571928180; 52°49′32″N 0°27′29″E	1077588	Church of St Peter More images
Church of St Peter and St Paul	West Newton, Sandringham	Parish Church	Medieval	15 August 1960	TF6962327590; 52°49′09″N 0°30′57″E	1342429	Church of St Peter and St Paul More images
Wolferton railway station down side	Wolferton, Sandringham	House	1988	2 September 1988	TF6605128541; 52°49′44″N 0°27′48″E	1077593	Wolferton railway station down side More images
Wolferton railway station Gates, Piers and Railings to down side	Wolferton, Sandringham	Gate	c. 1898	2 September 1988	TF6600228540; 52°49′44″N 0°27′45″E	1168875	Wolferton railway station Gates, Piers and Railings to down side More images
Wolferton Station Goods Office circa 10 Metres North East of down side	Wolferton, Sandringham	Railway Office	1898	2 September 1988	TF6608028568; 52°49′45″N 0°27′49″E	1342433	Upload Photo
Wolferton Station Signal Box	Wolferton, Sandringham	Signal Box	1862	2 September 1988	TF6600028507; 52°49′43″N 0°27′45″E	1077592	Wolferton Station Signal Box More images
Church of Saint Peter and Saint Paul	Shernborne	Parish Church	11th century	5 June 1953	TF7137732428; 52°51′43″N 0°32′39″E	1153045	Church of Saint Peter and Saint Paul More images
Church of St Mary the Virgin	Shouldham Thorpe	Parish Church	Early 12th century	8 July 1959	TF6611708009; 52°38′40″N 0°27′14″E	1152535	Church of St Mary the Virgin More images
Ken Hill	Ken Hill, Snettisham	House	1878-9	15 October 1981	TF6753534938; 52°53′09″N 0°29′19″E	1077874	Upload Photo
Snettisham Old Hall	Snettisham	Country House	18th century	5 June 1953	TF6850834346; 52°52′49″N 0°30′10″E	1153140	Upload Photo
The Mill	Southgate, Snettisham	Watermill	1800	16 May 1977	TF6808533469; 52°52′21″N 0°29′45″E	1077845	The Mill
Barns, Stables and Attached Outbuildings at Waterden Farm	Waterden, South Creake	Oxhouse	1700-1871	15 November 1999	TF8869036108; 52°53′22″N 0°48′12″E	1379645	Upload Photo
Church of All Saints	Waterden, South Creake	Parish Church	Anglo Saxon	5 June 1953	TF8847935804; 52°53′12″N 0°48′00″E	1077758	Church of All Saints More images
Church of St Mary	South Wootton	Parish Church	Medieval	15 August 1960	TF6403522752; 52°46′39″N 0°25′50″E	1077597	Church of St Mary More images
Stoke Ferry Hall	Stoke Ferry	House	1792	9 July 1951	TL7039999912; 52°34′13″N 0°30′46″E	1077744	Stoke Ferry Hall More images
Church of St Mary	Stradsett	Parish Church	13th century	8 July 1959	TF6682105684; 52°37′24″N 0°27′47″E	1342301	Church of St Mary More images
Lovells Hall	Terrington St. Clement	House	1543	11 August 1951	TF5494519552; 52°45′05″N 0°17′39″E	1237117	Upload Photo
Thornham Hall	Thornham	House	c. 1780	5 June 1953	TF7343643174; 52°57′28″N 0°34′50″E	1342297	Upload Photo
Church of Saint Mary	Islington, Tilney St. Lawrence	Church ruin	Late 13th century	11 August 1951	TF5708316888; 52°43′37″N 0°19′29″E	1264178	Church of Saint Mary More images
Church of St Lawrence	Tilney St. Lawrence	Parish Church	14th century	11 August 1951	TF5496514860; 52°42′33″N 0°17′33″E	1237259	Church of St Lawrence More images
Village Cross	Titchwell	Village Cross	Mediaeval	5 June 1953	TF7623743721; 52°57′43″N 0°37′21″E	1273642	Village Cross More images
Crescent House	Upwell	House	c1620-40	18 January 1978	TF5027802762; 52°36′07″N 0°13′03″E	1125935	Upload Photo
The Cottages East of Lloyds Bank	Upwell	House	19th century	31 October 1983	TF5045502774; 52°36′07″N 0°13′13″E	1161209	Upload Photo
Welle Manor Hall	New Road, Upwell	Manor House	Mid 14th century	11 August 1951	TF5060502717; 52°36′05″N 0°13′20″E	1171599	Upload Photo
Old Manor Farmhouse	The Chase, Walpole	Farmhouse	1638	11 August 1951	TF5021717041; 52°43′49″N 0°13′23″E	1237330	Upload Photo
Church of St Mary the Virgin	Welney	Parish Church	1848	6 February 1986	TL5262293850; 52°31′16″N 0°14′53″E	1168946	Church of St Mary the Virgin More images
Church of St Margaret of Antioch	Wereham	Church	Early 13th century	5 July 1959	TF6810301667; 52°35′13″N 0°28′48″E	1342376	Church of St Margaret of Antioch More images
Barn 100 Metres South West of Abbey Farmhouse with Detached Gable 10 Metres to North	West Acre	Barn	Late Medieval	19 October 1951	TF7803015051; 52°42′14″N 0°38′01″E	1171759	Upload Photo
Remains of Base of South West Tower and Part of West Claustral Range of West Acre Priory, 20 Metres East of Abbey Farm House	West Acre	Tower	12th century	19 October 1951	TF7814915140; 52°42′17″N 0°38′07″E	1077661	Remains of Base of South West Tower and Part of West Claustral Range of West Acre Priory, 20 Metres East of Abbey Farm House
Gatepiers at North East Corner of Abbey Precinct	West Dereham	Gate Pier	1697	9 July 1951	TF6629800842; 52°34′48″N 0°27′11″E	1342341	Gatepiers at North East Corner of Abbey Precinct More images
Ruins of Service Wing of West Dereham Abbey House	West Dereham	Stable	1697	9 July 1951	TF6611600498; 52°34′37″N 0°27′00″E	1170628	Upload Photo
Ruins of West Dereham Abbey House	West Dereham	House	1697	9 July 1951	TF6612600630; 52°34′41″N 0°27′01″E	1077755	Upload Photo
Church of St Mary	West Winch	Church	1766	15 August 1960	TF6322115865; 52°42′57″N 0°24′54″E	1342420	Church of St Mary More images
Fitton Oake	Wiggenhall St. Germans	House	1570-77	9 July 1951	TF5943013490; 52°41′44″N 0°21′28″E	1077894	Upload Photo
Ruins of Church of St Peter	Wiggenhall St. Germans	Parish Church	15th century	8 July 1959	TF6043413252; 52°41′35″N 0°22′21″E	1152777	Ruins of Church of St Peter More images
St Germans Hall	Wiggenhall St. Germans	House	Mid 17th century	9 July 1951	TF5936614194; 52°42′07″N 0°21′26″E	1304623	St Germans Hall More images
St Marys Hall	Wiggenhall St. Germans	House	1864	9 July 1951	TF5847114475; 52°42′17″N 0°20′39″E	1304598	Upload Photo
The Priory	Wiggenhall St. Mary Magdalen	House	late C20	9 July 1951	TF5999811451; 52°40′38″N 0°21′55″E	1152801	Upload Photo
Church of St Mary	Wimbotsham	Church	1525	9 July 1951	TF6223704892; 52°37′03″N 0°23′42″E	1205605	Church of St Mary More images
Church of St Michael	Wormegay	Parish Church	13th century	8 July 1959	TF6741712027; 52°40′48″N 0°28′30″E	1077839	Church of St Michael More images
Church of All Saints	Wretton	Parish Church	Late 13th century	11 December 1985	TL6903499909; 52°34′15″N 0°29′34″E	1342342	Church of All Saints More images
Bank House	King's Lynn	Toll House	16th century	1 December 1951	TF6160419948; 52°45′11″N 0°23′35″E	1220654	Upload Photo
Bishop's Lynn House	King's Lynn	House	Late C14/Early 15th century	1 December 1951	TF6164820361; 52°45′24″N 0°23′38″E	1289527	Upload Photo
Burnham House and Attached Walls	King's Lynn	House	19th century	1 December 1951	TF6175519709; 52°45′03″N 0°23′43″E	1195435	Upload Photo
Church of All Saints	King's Lynn	Parish Church	11th century	1 December 1951	TF6204019570; 52°44′58″N 0°23′58″E	1195345	Church of All Saints More images
Church of St Faith	Gaywood	Parish Church	Norman	1 December 1951	TF6361520396; 52°45′23″N 0°25′23″E	1195311	Church of St Faith More images
Church of St Peter	West Lynn	Parish Church	Norman	1 December 1951	TF6121019736; 52°45′04″N 0°23′14″E	1290105	Church of St Peter More images
Cross beneath Greyfriars Tower	King's Lynn	Cross	C9-C10	26 July 1993	TF6201219783; 52°45′05″N 0°23′56″E	1290255	Cross beneath Greyfriars Tower
Gaolhouse	King's Lynn	Prison	1784	1 December 1951	TF6172919860; 52°45′08″N 0°23′42″E	1195399	Gaolhouse More images
Greenland Fishery House	King's Lynn	Jettied House	1605-8	1 December 1951	TF6188219623; 52°45′00″N 0°23′49″E	1219470	Greenland Fishery House More images
Health Centre 5m South West of Nos 7 and 9 King Street	King's Lynn	Warehouse	15th century	9 December 1988	TF6159220086; 52°45′15″N 0°23′35″E	1220209	Health Centre 5m South West of Nos 7 and 9 King Street
King Edward VII High School	King's Lynn	Grammar School	1906	7 June 1972	TF6297420417; 52°45′24″N 0°24′49″E	1195312	Upload Photo
Lattice House	King's Lynn	House	Occupied by 1487	1 December 1951	TF6181720328; 52°45′23″N 0°23′47″E	1291415	Lattice House More images
Length of Town Wall	King's Lynn	Town Gate	1266	1 December 1951	TF6237220264; 52°45′20″N 0°24′17″E	1220776	Upload Photo
Length of Town Wall	King's Lynn	Town Wall	1266	1 December 1951	TF6231720460; 52°45′27″N 0°24′14″E	1298197	Upload Photo
Marriott's Warehouse	King's Lynn	Warehouse	Early 14th century	1 December 1951	TF6165619761; 52°45′05″N 0°23′37″E	1212000	Marriott's Warehouse More images
Medieval Merchant's House	7-9 King Street, King's Lynn	Apartment	C20	1 December 1951	TF6162020096; 52°45′16″N 0°23′36″E	1291131	Upload Photo
Museum of Social History	27 King Street, King's Lynn	House	Early 19th century	1 December 1951	TF6163020208; 52°45′19″N 0°23′37″E	1298222	Museum of Social History
North Guannock Gate and Portion of Town Wall	King's Lynn	Town Gate	Late 13th century	1 December 1951	TF6246019731; 52°45′03″N 0°24′20″E	1219520	North Guannock Gate and Portion of Town Wall More images
Northern Gateway to Carmelite Precinct	King's Lynn	Gate	15th century	1 December 1951	TF6188019500; 52°44′56″N 0°23′49″E	1212056	Northern Gateway to Carmelite Precinct More images
Oxley House	King's Lynn	House	Late 17th century	1 December 1951	TF6179119672; 52°45′02″N 0°23′45″E	1298134	Upload Photo
Tudor Rose Hotel	King's Lynn	House	16th century	1 December 1951	TF6176620413; 52°45′26″N 0°23′44″E	1298153	Tudor Rose Hotel More images
1-3 Purfleet Place	King's Lynn	Terrace	c. 1825	1 December 1951	TF6163120001; 52°45′12″N 0°23′37″E	1195413	Upload Photo
12–20 Priory Lane	King's Lynn	Benedictine Monastery	14th century	1 December 1951	TF6177919758; 52°45′04″N 0°23′44″E	1195412	12–20 Priory Lane More images
1, St Margaret's Place	King's Lynn	House	Late 15th century	7 June 1972	TF6169619829; 52°45′07″N 0°23′40″E	1195390	Upload Photo
2, St Margaret's Place	King's Lynn	House	Early 18th century	1 December 1951	TF6170419808; 52°45′06″N 0°23′40″E	1195391	Upload Photo
30 & 32 Pilot Street	King's Lynn	House	19th century	1 December 1951	TF6192420482; 52°45′28″N 0°23′53″E	1195408	Upload Photo
15 & 16 Tuesday Market Place	King's Lynn	House	Early 16th century	1 December 1951	TF6168120388; 52°45′25″N 0°23′40″E	1212298	Upload Photo
17 & 18 Church Street	King's Lynn	House	C20	7 June 1972	TF6181819761; 52°45′04″N 0°23′46″E	1219670	Upload Photo
5 King Street	King's Lynn	House	Mid 18th century	1 December 1951	TF6162120084; 52°45′15″N 0°23′36″E	1220161	Upload Photo
15 King Street	King's Lynn	House	Mid 18th century	1 December 1951	TF6162020141; 52°45′17″N 0°23′36″E	1195285	Upload Photo
15a King Street	King's Lynn	House	Early 16th century	1 December 1951	TF6162020128; 52°45′17″N 0°23′36″E	1298219	Upload Photo
25 Queen Street	King's Lynn	House	Mid 18th century	1 December 1951	TF6165219886; 52°45′09″N 0°23′37″E	1210409	Upload Photo
29a & 29b Queen Street	King's Lynn	House	Early 17th century	1 December 1951	TF6165919864; 52°45′08″N 0°23′38″E	1290483	Upload Photo
2a, 2b, 2c, St Ann's Street	King's Lynn	Shops	1993	1 December 1951	TF6181520540; 52°45′30″N 0°23′47″E	1210489	2a, 2b, 2c, St Ann's Street
4 & 6 St Ann's Street	King's Lynn	House	C20	1 December 1951	TF6181220532; 52°45′29″N 0°23′47″E	1298127	Upload Photo
2 Nelson Street	King's Lynn	House	1993	1 December 1951	TF6174519746; 52°45′04″N 0°23′42″E	1195431	2 Nelson Street More images
9 Nelson Street	King's Lynn	House	1703	1 December 1951	TF6174619722; 52°45′03″N 0°23′42″E	1195434	9 Nelson Street More images
15 & 17 Nelson Street	King's Lynn	House	17th century	1 December 1951	TF6177619686; 52°45′02″N 0°23′44″E	1221095	Upload Photo
81, 81a, 81b High Street	King's Lynn	Shop	Early 17th century	1 December 1951	TF6172920159; 52°45′17″N 0°23′42″E	1195317	Upload Photo

== See also ==
- Grade I listed buildings in King's Lynn and West Norfolk
