= Coxford =

Coxford may refer to the following places in England:

- Coxford, Cornwall, a hamlet in the parish of St Gennys, Cornwall
- Coxford, Norfolk, village and civil parish in Norfolk
- Coxford, Southampton, an electoral ward in Southampton
- Coxford Priory, a ruined priory in Coxford, Norfolk

== See also ==
- Cox Ford Covered Bridge, in Turkey Run State Park, Indiana, U.S.
