= Broomsthorpe =

Former civil parish in Norfolk, England

Coordinates: 52.821°N 00.743°E

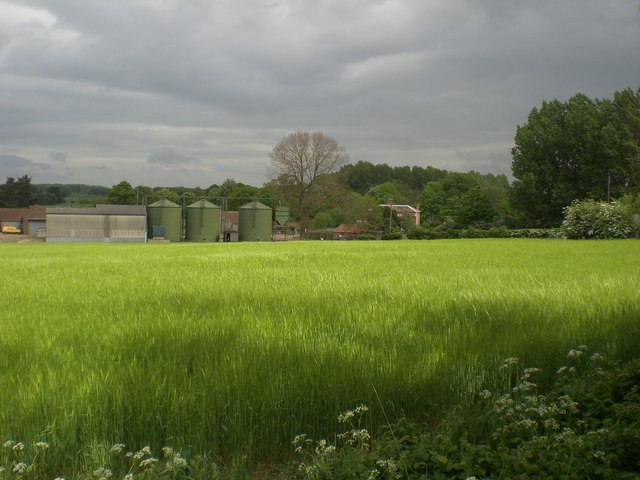
- Broomsthorpe Farm

- Location within Norfolk
- OS grid reference: TF8428
- Civil parish: East Rudham
- District: King's Lynn and West Norfolk
- Shire county: Norfolk
- Region: East
- Country: England
- Sovereign state: United Kingdom
- Post town: King's Lynn
- Postcode district: PE31
- UK Parliament: North West Norfolk

Broomsthorpe is a settlement in the civil parish of East Rudham, in the King's Lynn and West Norfolk district of the English county of Norfolk. It is 4 1/2 miles (7.2 km) west of Fakenham, 15 miles (24 km) north-east of King's Lynn, and 27 miles (43 km) north-west of Norwich. The River Tat, a tributary of the River Wensum, marked the eastern edge of the parish.

== History ==
At the Domesday Survey of 1086 Broomsthorpe is recorded as having nine households, two plough teams and a mill. In the Hundred of Brothercross, (Note: By 1845 Broomsthorpe was in Gallow Hundred.) it formed part of the holdings of Ely Abbey. The village was not mentioned in the lay subsidy roll of 1334, but recorded with more than 10 households in 1428, at which time William de Pinkeneye had a house in the parish. By the lay subsidy roll of 1524 it was included with the neighbouring parish of Tattersett and by the early 16th century the village church, which is thought to have been dedicated to St John the Evangelist, had been abandoned.

For a time Broomsthorpe was an extra-parochial area. In 1858 it became a separate civil parish but by the 1870s the population had fallen to 16 with three houses; John Marius Wilson described it as a "hamlet". At the 1921 census the parish had a population of five, although this had risen to 22 at the 1931 census. On 1 April 1935 the parish was abolished and merged with East Rudham.

The former parish is now largely depopulated. A number of possible sites for the former settlement have been suggested, and it has been speculated that the village may be the same place as the lost settlement of Sengham. (Note: There is some doubt whether Sengham existed as a separate settlement. It may have had a church, but may also have been part of the lost settlement of Tattersett St Andrew.) A series of four medieval fishponds west of the River Tat near Broomsthorpe Hall is one possible site, although these may have been associated with Coxford Priory 1/2 mile (0.80 km) to the north of the site. (Note: Coxford Priory is alternatively known as Broomsthorpe Priory. It was founded at St Mary's Church in East Rudham and moved to Coxford by 1215. It was dissolved in 1558.)

An alternative site to the east of the River Tat in Tattersett has scheduled monument status. A number of earthworks and a probable hollow way remain visible and the site is recognised as a deserted medieval village site. This site is close to the Church of All Saints in Tattersett and possibly associated with the lost church of St Andrew. (Note: St Andrew's was one of two churches known to have been in Tattersett, both of which were controlled by Castle Acre Priory. It was abandoned after the dissolution of the monasteries in the mid-16th century.)

== Modern Broomsthorpe ==
The modern place of Broomsthorpe is in the parish of East Rudham. It consists of a handful of houses and the Grade II listed Broomsthorpe Hall. The hall dates from around 1800 but has an undercroft that is believed to be part of a medieval manorial building and medieval stonework has been reused in the fabric of the building.
