= When Marnie Was There =

When Marnie Was There may refer to:

- When Marnie Was There (novel), a 1967 novel by Joan G. Robinson
- When Marnie Was There (film), a 2014 film by Hiromasa Yonebayashi, based on the novel
