= Raynham Park railway station =

Former railway station in Norfolk, England

Coordinates: 52.8119°N 0.7690°E

Raynham Park
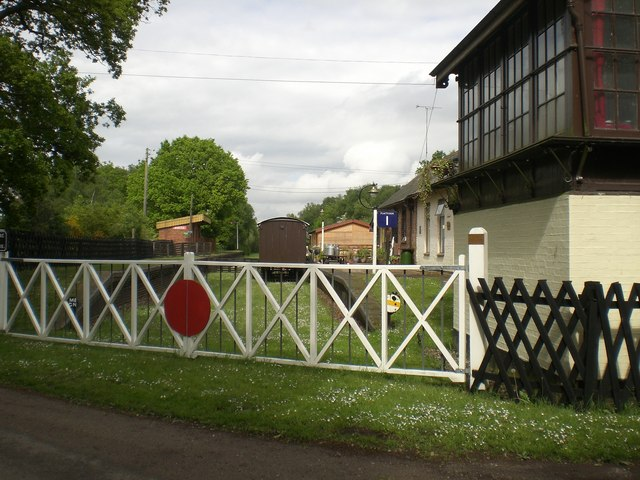
- Converted station buildings in 2007

General information
- Location: near Helhoughton, North Norfolk, Norfolk; England
- Grid reference: TF867274
- Platforms: 2

Other information
- Status: Disused

History
- Pre-grouping: Lynn and Fakenham Railway; Midland and Great Northern Joint Railway
- Post-grouping: Midland and Great Northern Joint Railway; Eastern Region of British Railways

Key dates
- 16 August 1880: Opened
- 2 March 1959: Closed
Location

Raynham Park railway station was a station in Norfolk, England. It was opened in the 19th century as part of the Midland and Great Northern Joint Railway main line from the Midlands to Great Yarmouth. It closed in 1959 along with the rest of the line.

== History ==
The station lay approximately 1/2 mile (0.80 km) from the small hamlets of Tatterford and Helhoughton but took its name from the Raynham Hall residence of Lord Townshend, erstwhile chairman of the Lynn & Fakenham Railway, some 1 1/2 miles (2.4 km) away.

Preceding station	Disused railways	Following station
East Rudham	Midland and Great Northern	Fakenham West

== Present day ==
The station buildings survive as a private residence. The present owners have added an old carriage on rails at the former station platform.
