= Robert Bale (monk) =

Robert Bale, O.Carm. (died 1503) was an English Carmelite friar and scholar.

== Biography ==
Bale was a native of Norfolk, and when very young entered the Carmelite monastery at Norwich. Having a great love of learning, he spent a portion of every year in the Carmelite priories at Oxford or Cambridge. He became prior of the monastery of his order at Burnham Norton. Bale enjoyed a high reputation for learning, and collected a valuable library, which he bequeathed to his priory upon his death on 11 November 1503.

His principal works were:

1. Annales Ordinis Carmelitarum (Bod. Arch. Seld. B. 72).
2. Historia Heliæ Prophetæ
3. Officium Simonis Angli (i.e. of St. Simon Stock, the first English Carmelite friar and a major figure in the establishment of the Carmelite Order).
