= St Mary's Church, Fordham =

Coordinates: 52.5706°N 0.3838°E

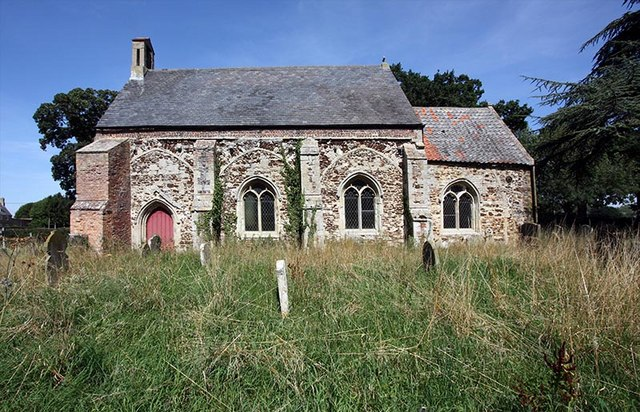
- St Mary's Church, Fordham, from the south

- Location in Norfolk
- OS grid reference: TL 617 996
- Location: Fordham, Norfolk
- Country: England
- Denomination: Anglican

Architecture
- Functional status: Redundant
- Heritage designation: Grade II*
- Designated: 9 July 1951
- Architectural type: Church
- Style: Gothic

Specifications
- Materials: Carstone, slated and tiled roofs

St Mary's Church is located to the south of the village of Fordham, Norfolk, England. It is a redundant Anglican parish church in the care of the Friends of Friendless Churches. The church is recorded in the National Heritage List for England as a designated Grade II* listed building.

== History ==
The church dates from the 13th century, with alterations made in the middle of the 14th century, and in 1730. In 1730, or about that time, the tower was demolished, as was the south aisle. It was declared redundant on 1 June 1991, and was vested in the Friends of Friendless Churches in September 2011.

== Architecture ==
St Mary's in constructed in carstone, which is a type of stone found locally. It has a simple plan, consisting of a nave and a chancel. The nave has a slate roof, and the chancel is roofed with tiles. On the west gable is a bell-cot. The former three-bay south arcade has been blocked in and two two-light windows with Perpendicular tracery have been inserted. The south wall of the chancel and the north wall of the nave each contain a similar widows. Also in the north wall of the nave is a three-light window, and in the chancel is a two-light window with Y-tracery, There is no east window. There are few remaining contents inside the church. The items still present include a floriated coffin lid, and the remains of a damaged medieval pew. There are also a candelabra and a pew designed by Randell Feilden, the brother of the conservation architect Sir Bernard Feilden.

== See also ==
- Grade II* listed buildings in King's Lynn and West Norfolk
