= Burnham Overy =

Civil parish in Norfolk, England

Coordinates: 52.957°N 0.742°E

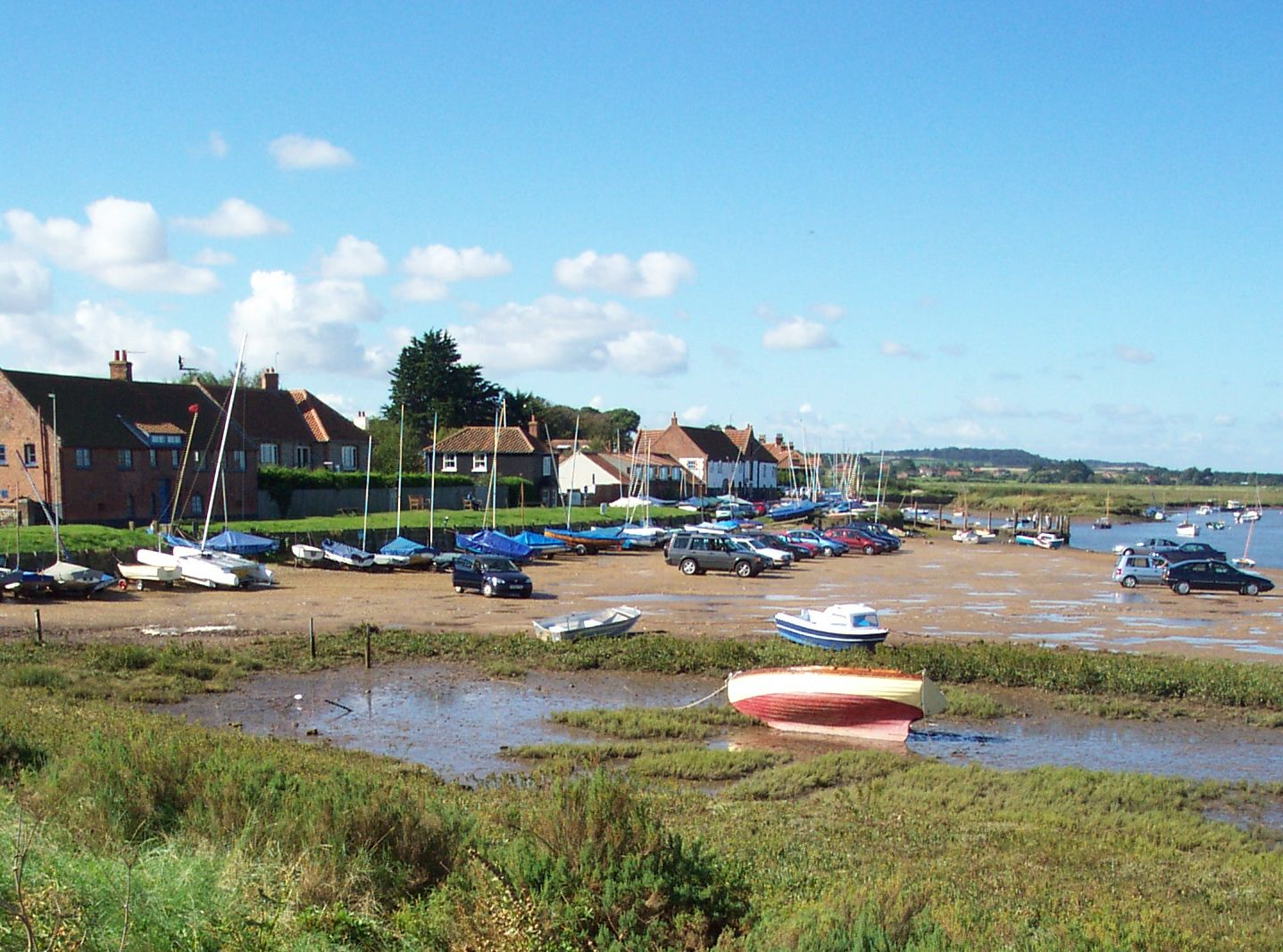
- The Staithe

- Location within Norfolk
- Area: 17.92 km^{2} (6.92 sq mi)
- Population: 297 (2021)
  - Density: 17/km^{2} (44/sq mi)
- OS grid reference: TF843435
- Civil parish: Burnham Overy
- District: King's Lynn and West Norfolk
- Shire county: Norfolk
- Region: East
- Country: England
- Sovereign state: United Kingdom
- Post town: KING'S LYNN
- Postcode district: PE31
- Dialling code: 01328
- Police: Norfolk
- Fire: Norfolk
- Ambulance: East of England
- UK Parliament: North West Norfolk

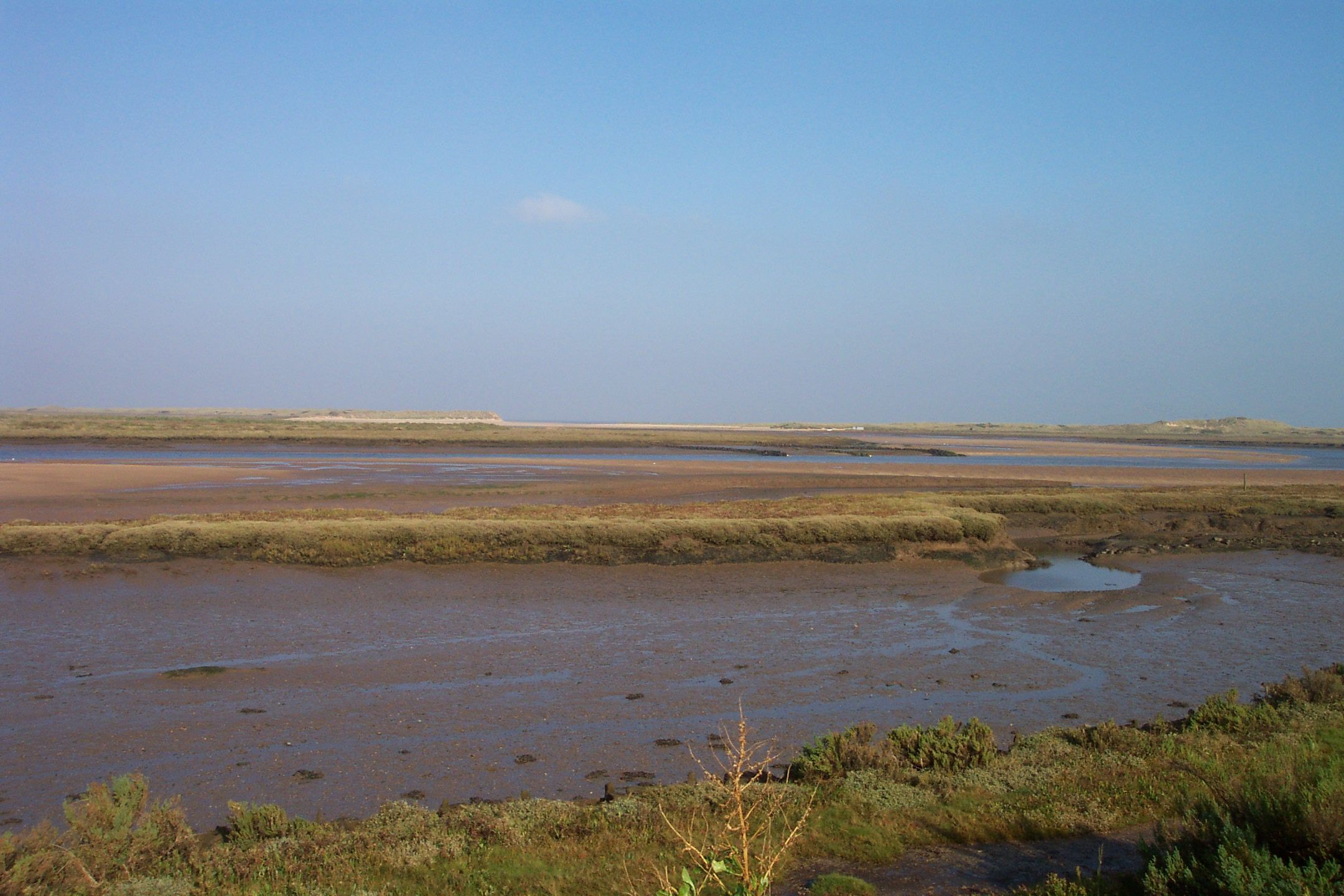
The creek, saltmarshes and, in the distance, harbour mouth

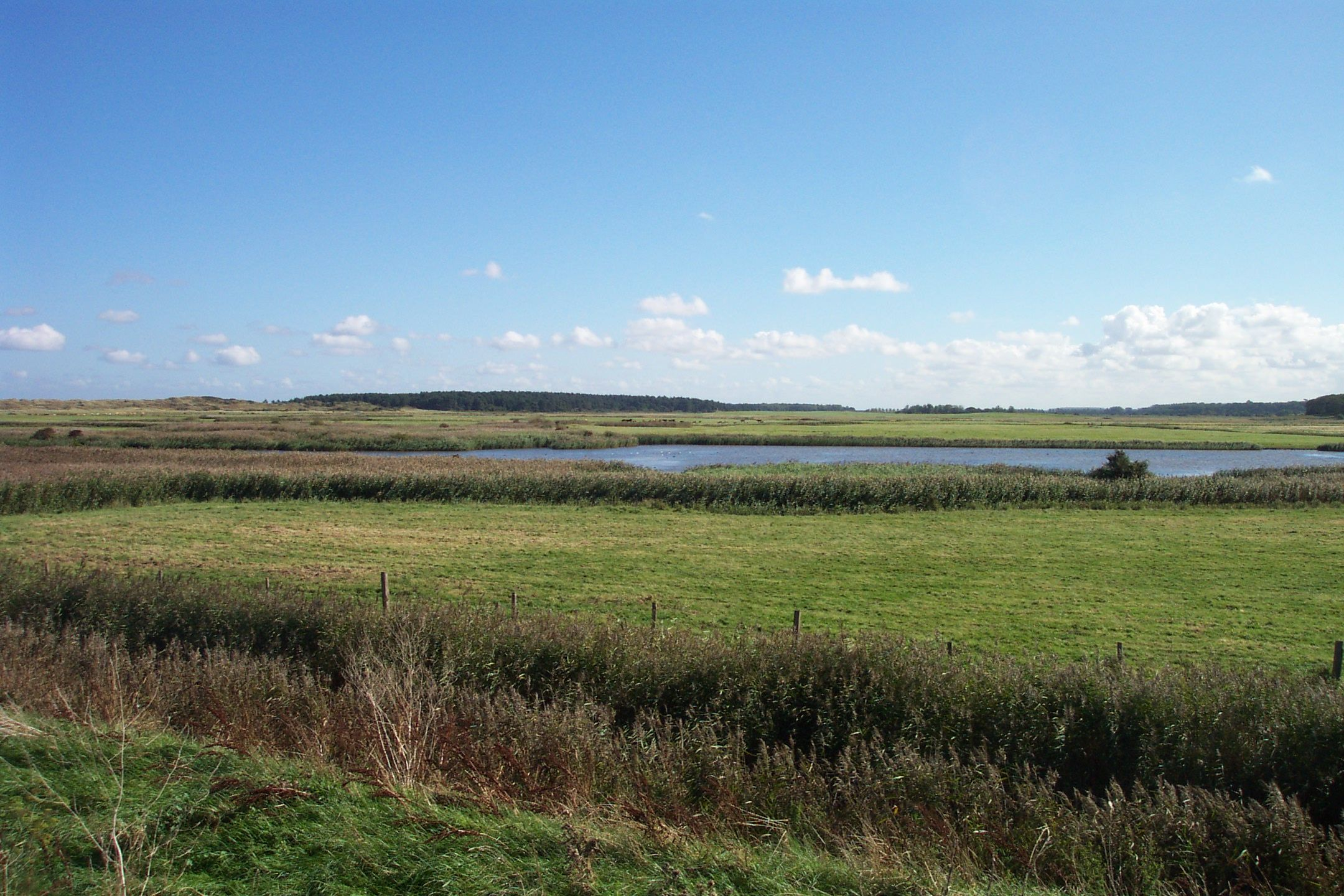
The fresh water meadows

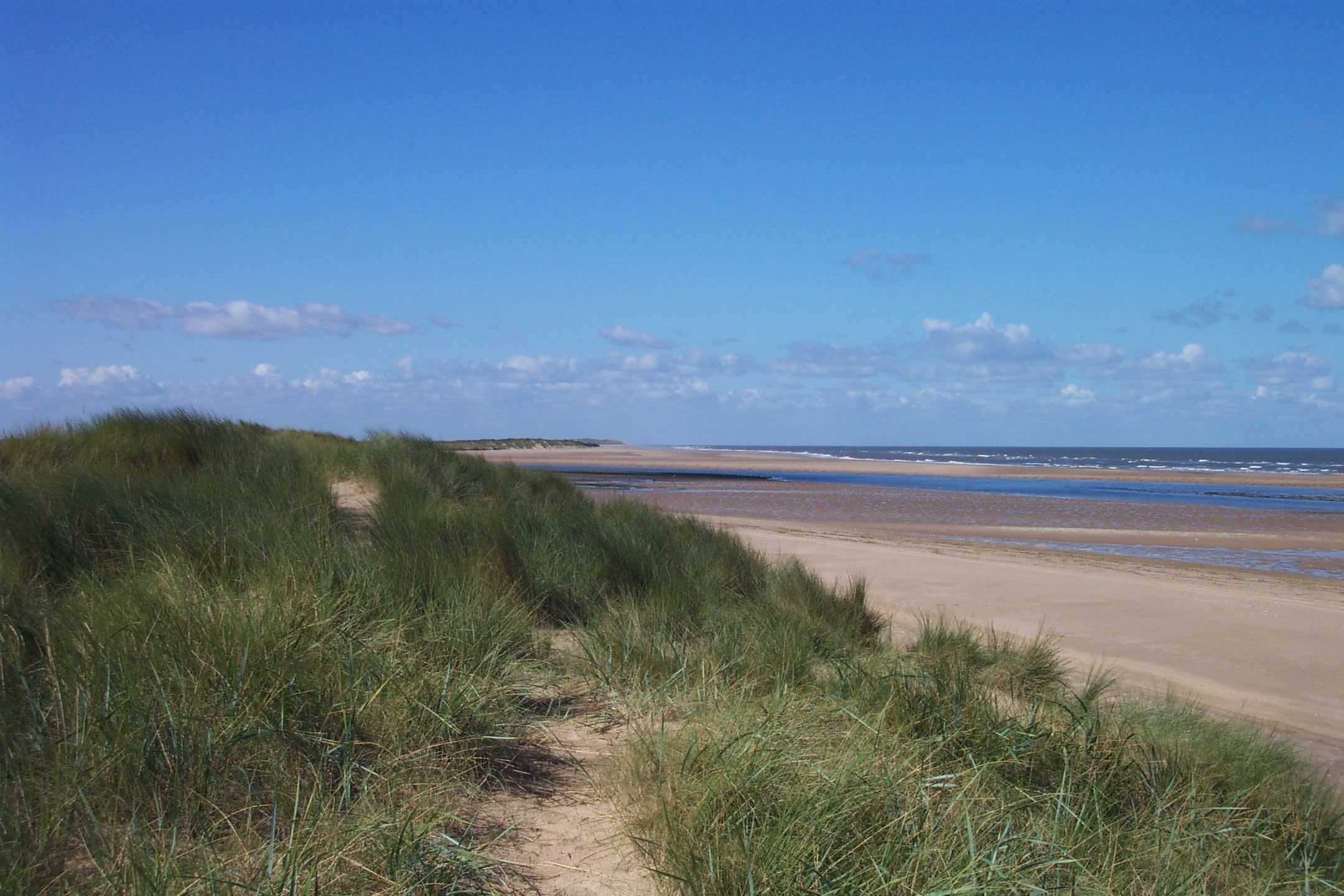
The sand dunes, beach and harbour mouth

Burnham Overy is a civil parish on the north coast of Norfolk, England. The parish includes the settlements of Burnham Overy Town, the original village adjacent to the medieval parish church and now reduced to a handful of houses, and Burnham Overy Staithe, a larger settlement about 1/2 mile (0.80 km) to the north on the estuary of the River Burn. It is 1 mile (1.6 km) north-west of Burnham Market, 20 miles (32 km) north-east of King's Lynn, and 30 miles (48 km) north-west of Norwich. The A149 road runs through the parish.

The civil parish has an area of 8.92 square kilometres (3.44 sq mi) and at the 2001 census had a population of 311 in 167 households, reducing to a population of 134 at the 2011 Census. For the purposes of local government, the parish falls within the district of King's Lynn and West Norfolk. At the 2021 census the parish had a population of 297.

== History ==
Burnham Thorpe, the birthplace of Horatio, Admiral Lord Nelson, lies 1 mile (1.6 km) to the south-. According to various documents, Nelson learned to row and sail a dinghy at Burnham Overy Staithe, at the age of 10, two years before joining the Navy. The village’s only pub is called The Hero in his honour.

Historically Burnham Overy Staithe was the port for the surrounding villages of the Burnhams. Both settlements lie on the River Burn, and until the end of the Middle Ages trading ships were able to reach Burnham Overy Town. With the silting of the river, commercial traffic switched to Burnham Overy Staithe. With the coming of the railway to the Burnhams in 1866, commercial shipping declined and the last cargo is believed to have been shipped from the Staithe soon after the end of the First World War.

Between Burnham Overy Staithe and the sea, the river spreads out into multiple tidal creeks through the salt marshes that fringe this stretch of coast, and finally reaches the sea by passing through the sand dunes at a gap near Gun Hill known locally as Burnham Harbour. Small boats can reach Burnham Overy Staithe through this gap and creek. Today Burnham Overy Staithe, and the associated harbour, is a recreational sailing centre. It is also the point of departure for seasonal ferries to Scolt Head Island National Nature Reserve.

To the east of Burnham Overy creek, former salt marshes have been reclaimed to form fresh water meadows, part of the Holkham estate. A 1 1/2 miles (2.4 km) long footpath links Burnham Overy Staithe to the sand-dunes and beach, running along the crest of an embankment.

== St Clement's Church ==
Burnham Overy's parish church is dedicated to Clement of Rome and dates from the 12th century. It is located at Burnham Overy Town and is Grade I listed. The church retains many of its medieval features in addition to a set of Stuart royal arms which have been re-lettered with the name of George III.

== Notable people ==
- Richard Woodget (1845–1928), captain of the Cutty Sark, born and died in Burnham Overy
- Robert Austin (1895–1973), artist and engraver, died in Burnham Overy

== In popular culture ==
In Joan G. Robinson's 1967 book When Marnie Was There, the villages of Little Overton and Barnham are based upon Burnham Overy, especially the key locations of the staithe and the windmill.

Leith House Orchards, a family-run orchard, was featured in BBC Two's The Hairy Bikers Go Local in January 2023.
