= East Rudham railway station =

Former railway station in Norfolk, England

Coordinates: 52.8034°N 0.7273°E

East Rudham
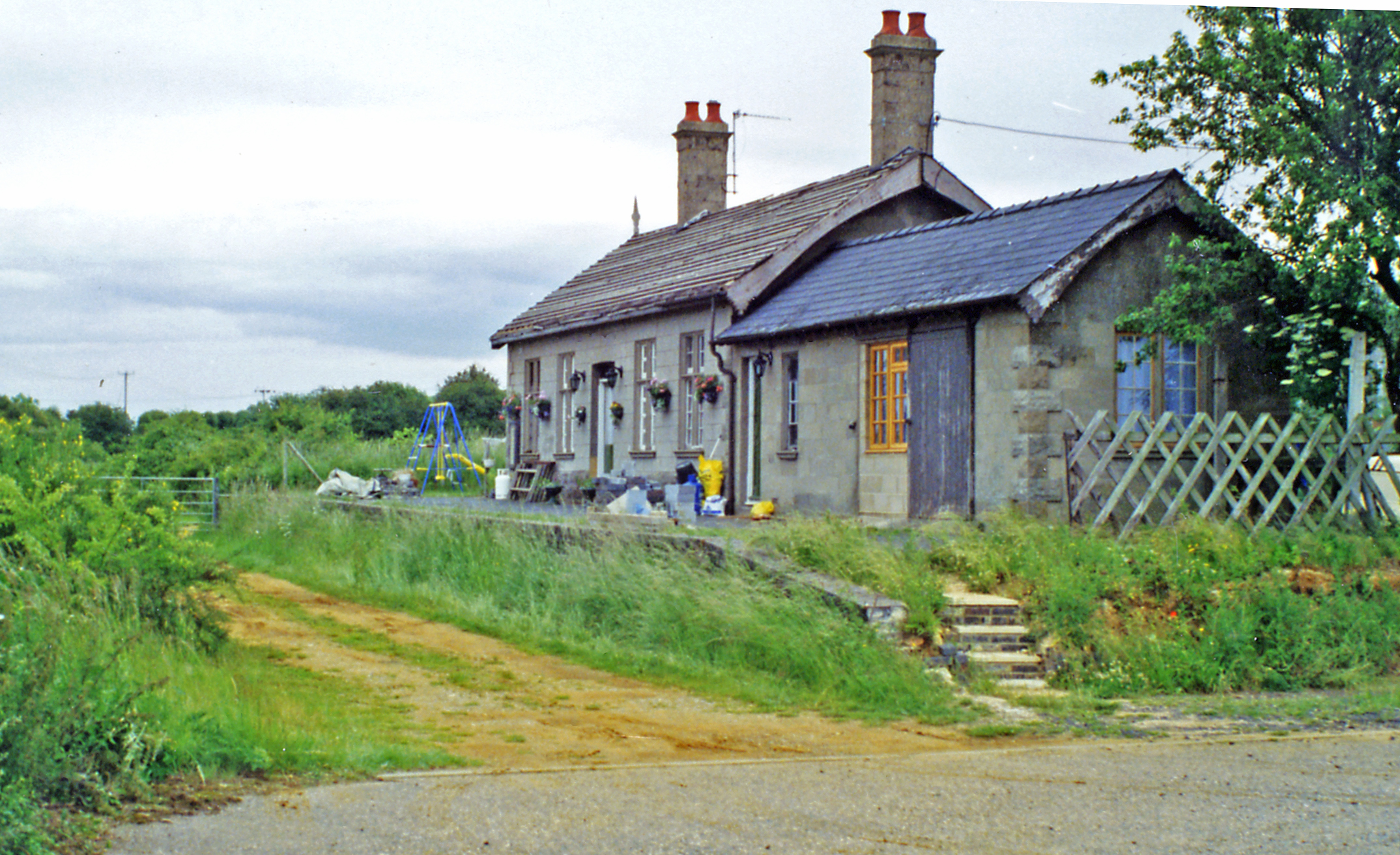
- Station in 1997.

General information
- Location: East Rudham, King's Lynn and West Norfolk, Norfolk; England
- Grid reference: TF839263
- Platforms: 2

Other information
- Status: Disused

History
- Pre-grouping: Lynn and Fakenham Railway; Midland and Great Northern Joint Railway
- Post-grouping: Midland and Great Northern Joint Railway; Eastern Region of British Railways

Key dates
- 16 August 1880: Opened (Rudham)
- 1 March 1882: Renamed (East Rudham)
- 2 March 1959: Closed to passengers
- 3 April 1967: Closed to freight
Location

East Rudham railway station is a former station in East Rudham, Norfolk. It opened in 1880 and closed in 1967. It was on the Midland and Great Northern Joint Railway between South Lynn and Melton Constable. Initially known as Rudham railway station, it changed its name to East Rudham after two years.

Former Services

| Preceding station | Disused railways | Following station |
|---|---|---|
| Massingham | Midland and Great Northern | Raynham Park |

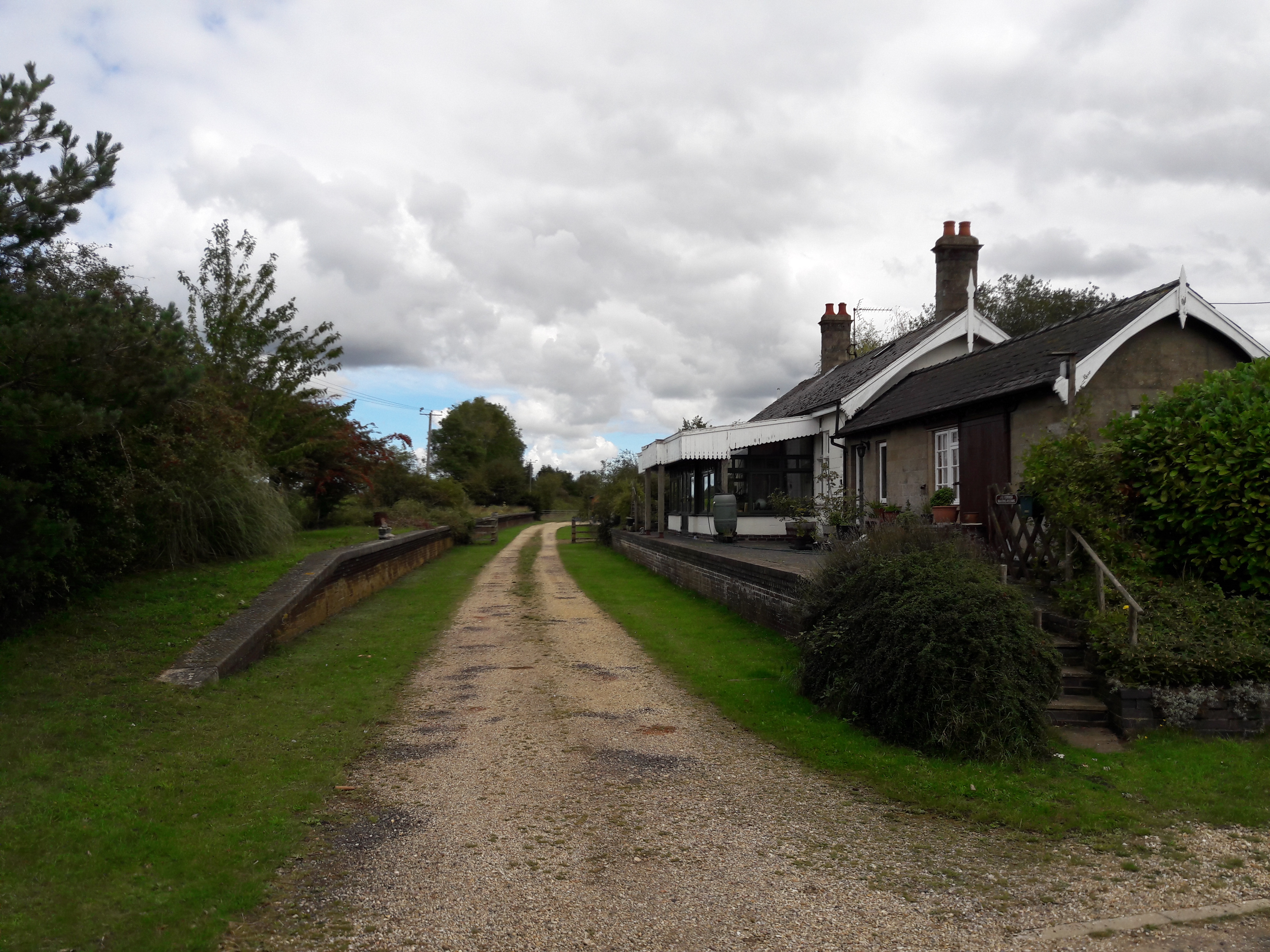
The station in 2020 seen from Station Road, looking east
