= St Mary's Church, Islington, Norfolk =

St Mary's Church, Islington
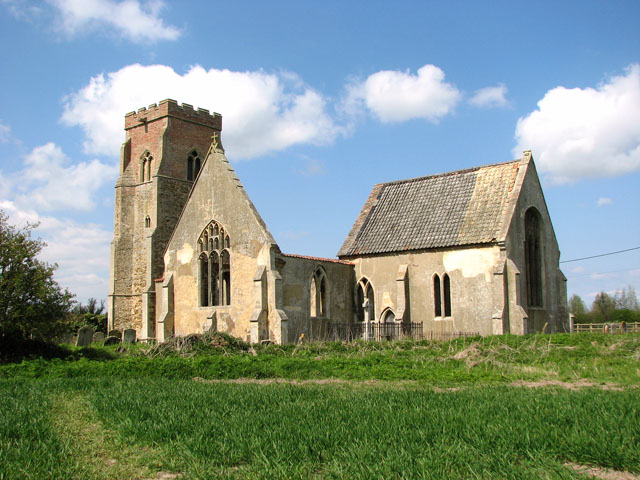
- Ruins of St Mary's Church, Islington, from the southeast

- Location in Norfolk
- 52.7268°N 0.3247°E
- OS grid reference: TF 571 168
- Location: Islington, Norfolk
- Country: England
- Denomination: Anglican
- Website: Churches Conservation Trust

Architecture
- Functional status: Redundant
- Heritage designation: Grade II*
- Designated: 11 August 1951
- Architectural type: Church
- Style: Gothic

Specifications
- Materials: Stone with some brick Tiled roof

St Mary's Church is a ruined redundant Anglican church in the civil parish of Tilney St Lawrence, Norfolk, England. It is recorded in the National Heritage List for England as a designated Grade II* listed building, and is under the care of the Churches Conservation Trust. The ruins stand in an isolated position adjacent to Islington Hall Farm, immediately to the south of the A47 road between King's Lynn and Wisbech.

== History ==
The oldest fabric in the ruin dates from the late 13th century, and is found in the nave, the chancel, and the transepts. The tower was added when the church was remodelled in the 15th century. Although it is now a ruin, the church was still intact in 1883. The chancel was closed by the building of a west wall in 1972.

== Architecture ==
The church is constructed in stone, some of which has been rendered, with brick in the upper part of the tower. Its original plan was cruciform, with a nave, a chancel, north and south transepts, and a west tower. Only the tower and the chancel have retained their roofs. The chancel roof is tiled. The tower is in three stages, with stepped buttresses at the angles, and a stair turret on the southwest. In the lower stage is a west door and a three-light Perpendicular west window. The middle stage contains twin lancet windows, and in the top stage are two-light bell openings. The parapet is battlemented. The nave walls contain three-light square-headed windows. Only the gable ends of the transepts are standing. In the north transept gable is a window of three stepped lancets, and in the south gable is a three-light Perpendicular window. The west wall of the chancel contains three lancet windows, the east wall a three-light Perpendicular window, and the south wall a two-light window with Y-tracery, a priest's door and a pair of lancets. Inside the chancel are two monuments. On the north wall is a memorial to Edward Bragge who died in 1846, and on the east wall is a marble monument dated 1723, dedicated to the sons and daughters of Anthony Dixon.

== See also ==
- List of churches preserved by the Churches Conservation Trust in the East of England
