= Helhoughton =

Village in Norfolk, England

Coordinates: 52.80364°N 0.77029°E

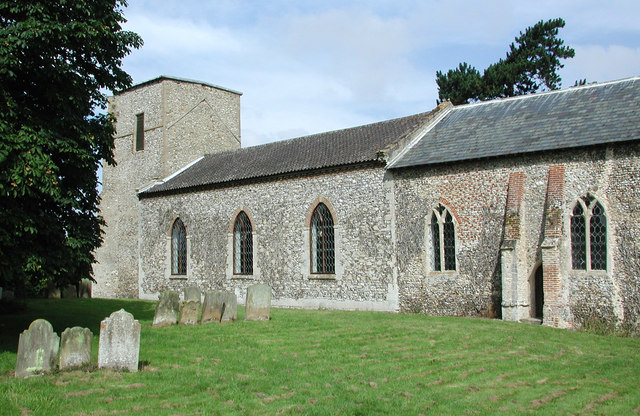
- All Saints Church

- Location within Norfolk
- Area: 2.64 sq mi (6.8 km^{2})
- Population: 503 (2021 census)
  - Density: 191/sq mi (74/km^{2})
- OS grid reference: TF8626
  - London: 112 miles (180 km)
- Civil parish: Helhoughton
- District: North Norfolk
- Shire county: Norfolk
- Region: East
- Country: England
- Sovereign state: United Kingdom
- Post town: FAKENHAM
- Postcode district: NR21
- Dialling code: 01485
- Police: Norfolk
- Fire: Norfolk
- Ambulance: East of England
- UK Parliament: North Norfolk

Helhoughton is a village and civil parish in the English county of Norfolk.

Helhoughton is located 4.2 miles (6.8 km) west-south-west of the town of Fakenham and 29.3 miles (47.2 km) west-northwest of Norwich.

== Correct pronunciation ==
"Hellot’n"

== History ==
Helhoughton's name is of mixed Anglo-Saxon and Viking origin and derives from the Old Norse name Helgi and the Old English for a farmstead.

In the Domesday Book, Helhoughton is listed as a settlement of 73 households in the hundred of Brothercross. In 1086, the village was part of the East Anglian estates of King William I, Peter de Valognes, William de Warenne and Hugh de Montfort.

Parts of the parish made up RAF West Raynham which was used by No. 2 Group RAF during the Second World War.

== Geography ==
According to the 2021 census, Helhoughton has a population of 503 people which shows an increase from the 346 people recorded in the 2011 census.

== All Saints' Church ==
Helhoughton's parish church dates from the Eighteenth Century and is located within the village on 'The Street.' All Saints' has been Grade II listed since 1959. The church holds Sunday services twice a month.

All Saints' features a brass memorial to William Stapleton from 1440 and a set of royal arms from the reign of King James I which were subsequently re-lettered in the reign of Queen Anne.

== Governance ==
Helhoughton is part of the electoral ward of The Raynhams for local elections and is part of the district of North Norfolk.

The village's national constituency is North Norfolk, which has been represented by the Liberal Democrat Steff Aquarone MP since 2024.

== Notable residents ==
- Marshal Sir David Craig OBE was created Baron Craig of Radley, of Helhoughton in the County of Norfolk in 1991.

== War Memorial ==
Helhoughton's war memorial is a stone plaque fixed to the exterior of the churchtower which lists the following names for the First World War:

Rank	Name	Unit	Date of death	Burial/Commemoration
Gnr.	William H. Nudds	Royal Field Artillery	28 Jul. 1917	Coxyde Cemetery
Pte.	Robert T. Raines	4th Bn., Coldstream Guards	15 Sep. 1916	Thiepval Memorial
Pte.	George J. Shreeve	1st Bn., Norfolk Regiment	14 Feb. 1915	Wulverghem Road Cemetery
Pte.	Philip A. Shreeve	2nd Bn., Norfolk Regt.	16 Jan. 1916	Amara War Cemetery
Pte.	John H. Barber	5th Bn., Norfolk Regt.	12 Aug. 1915	Helles Memorial
Pte.	William Griffin	5th Bn., Norfolk Regt.	19 Apr. 1917	Jerusalem Memorial
Pte.	Walter J. Howard	11th Bn., Suffolk Regiment	3 Aug. 1916	Thiepval Memorial

The following names were added after the Second World War:

Rank	Name	Unit	Date of death	Burial/Commemoration
FSgt.	Richard A. Francis	No. 272 (Coastal) Squadron RAF	25 Oct. 1942	Alamein Memorial
