= When Marnie Was There (novel) =

1967 novel by Joan Gale Robinson

- First edition
- Author: Joan G. Robinson
- Illustrator: Peggy Fortnum
- Cover artist: Peggy Fortnum
- Language: English
- Genre: Fantasy
- Set in: Norfolk, England
- Publisher: Collins
- Publication date: 1967
- Publication place: United Kingdom
- Media type: Hardcover
- Pages: 224
- OCLC: 38977

When Marnie Was There is a novel by British author Joan G. Robinson, first published in 1967 by Collins. The story follows Anna, a young girl who temporarily moves to Norfolk to heal after becoming ill. There she meets a mysterious and headstrong girl named Marnie who lives in a house overlooking the marshes. They develop a secretive relationship they come to cherish. The novel explores themes of alienation, loneliness, and forgiveness in childhood. It received highly positive reviews, praised for its intensity of natural imagery, balance of humour with difficult themes, and emotional weight. The story was adapted to television in 1971 and radio in 2006. In 2014, it was adapted by Studio Ghibli as an animated film of the same name.

== Background ==
Robinson wrote young children's literature and was well known for her Teddy Robinson series that followed the make-believe interactions between a girl and a teddy bear, and later her Mary-Mary series that followed the mischievous family life of a young girl, which Peter Vansittart described as "slightly more sophisticated". Robinson saw writing books for older children as a "welcome escape from the strict discipline of vocabulary and subject matter" of stories for younger children.

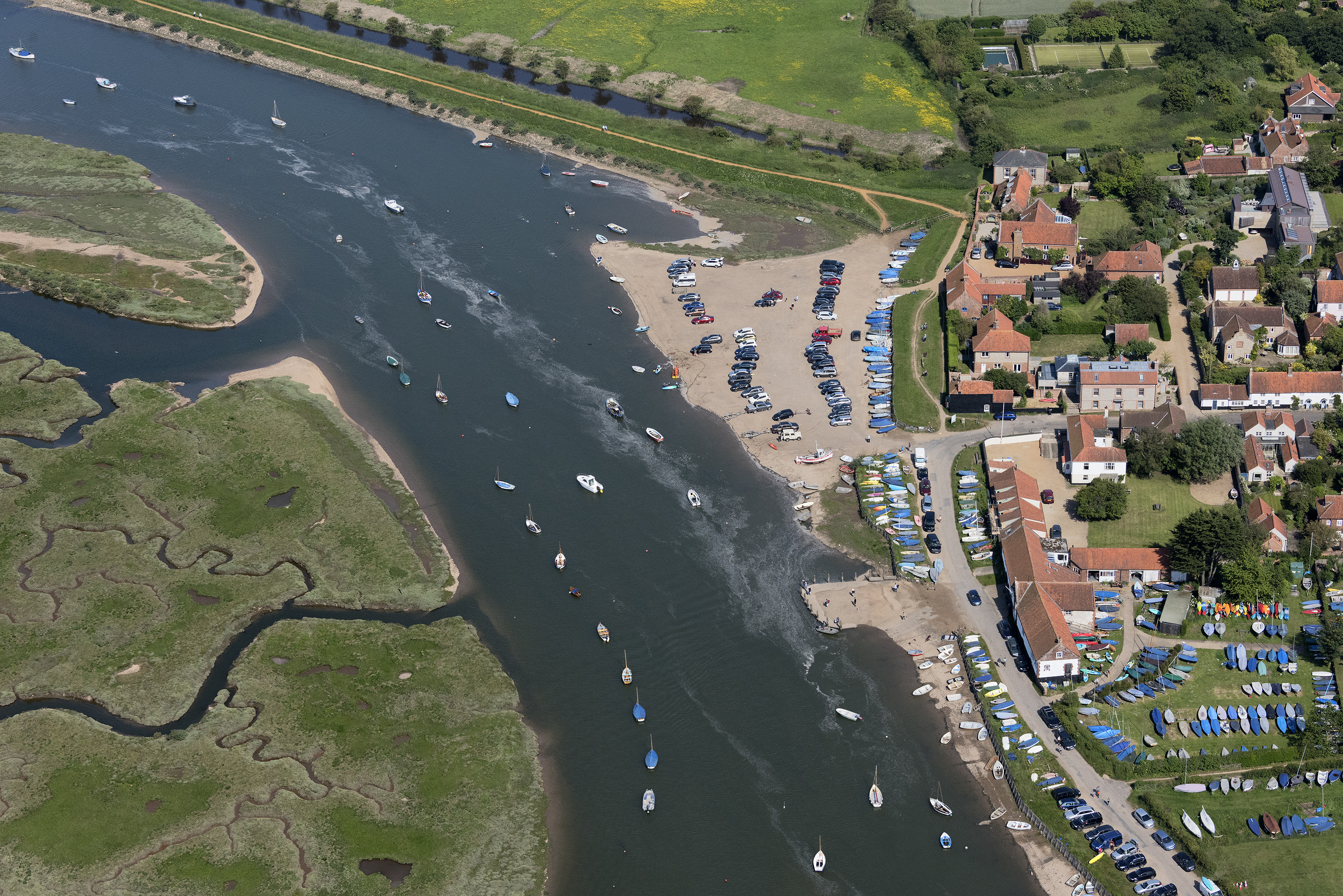
The location of Burnham Overy Staithe inspired Robinson.

The creation of When Marnie Was There began during a family summer holiday in the coastal village of Burnham Overy Staithe, according to Robinson's daughter. Robinson had a life-long connection to Norfolk, and a specific connection to Burnham Overy as early as 1950. Major natural features of the location include a creek and tidal marsh, with an isolated beach surrounded by sandhills. During low tide, Robinson walked from the beach along the marsh path, watchful of a house with distinctive blue doors and window frames, named "The Granary". At a distance, she noticed the house seemed to disappear into the surroundings—until low sunlight dramatically illuminated its brickwork. She came near the house and looked through an upper window, where she saw a young girl sitting and having her hair brushed. This experience prompted Robinson to write a story.

Throughout the remainder of her stay in the village, she spent time in the sandhills and wrote notes, creating the characters of Anna and Marnie. The location of Burnham Overy Staithe directly defined the settings of the story. Characteristics of The Granary influenced the fictional "Marsh House" in the story. The beach, sandhills, meadows, and routes across the marsh became major settings of the story. Robinson continued to write more notes after that summer, which were collated and developed into a manuscript over the course of about 18 months.

== Summary ==
The novel follows a girl named Anna. Her foster mother, Mrs. Preston, anxiously bids farewell as Anna boards a train to Norfolk; she’d been invited by an old couple, the Peggs, to stay at their home after learning she’s ill. Anna apathetically reflects on her loneliness and Mrs Preston's overwhelming concern for her. On arrival she walks to the nearby staithe and sees an old house across the water—the Marsh House. Over the following days she spends time outdoors, finding quiet company with a local fisherman, Wuntermenny. Anna becomes upset when she quarrels with a local girl, Sandra, who views Anna as socially inept. Anna finds a boat one night and rows towards the Marsh House where outside she encounters a blonde-haired girl named Marnie.

Anna explains she’s a visitor to the area, and Marnie explains she lives in the Marsh House. The next night Marnie finds Anna and disguises her as a beggar girl, bringing her indoors to a lavish party, enchanting Anna. Thereafter, they meet regularly: Marnie explains her parents are typically absent and she’s instead supervised by two maids and a nanny. Anna explains she’s adopted, tearfully confiding that her foster parents are paid a care allowance, doubting she's sincerely loved. Marnie promises she will love her forever. Marnie admits a maid abuses her, and threatens to shut her in a nearby dilapidated windmill, and that she has an older cousin, Edward, who she alternately spends time with.

Anna visits the windmill alone expecting she can later reassure Marnie that it's not frightening, only to find Marnie there in terror, and then later disappearing. Heartbroken, she runs out and collapses. After spending days bedridden, Anna meets Marnie, who apologises to Anna and says she cannot see her anymore. Anna forgives her and then collapses in the marsh. Wuntermenny rescues her, and she returns to being bedridden. After recovering, Anna becomes sociable and reconciles with Mrs Preston when she visits. She meets a family, the Lindsays, who are moving into the Marsh House, befriending a girl, Scilla.

Scilla explains she found a diary at the Marsh House. They read the diary, which details Marnie's daily life. Scilla's mother, Mrs. Lindsay, interprets the archaic language and events, estimating the diary dates to the First World War. The diary is shown to a family friend of the Lindsays, Gillie, who explains the diary: Gillie reveals Marnie, a childhood friend of hers, grew up to marry Edward and have a daughter, Esmé. Edward died and Esmé was evacuated to America during the Second World War, becoming estranged from Marnie. Esmé married and had a daughter named Marianna, before dying in a car accident. Marianna briefly came into the care of Marnie, who died several years ago. Marianna was then adopted; it is revealed Anna herself, renamed from Marianna, was Marnie's only grandchild. Anna finds closure, and spends the next days with the Lindsays. Before going home, Anna goes outside to say goodbye to Wuntermenny and then turns to the mansion to see the spirit of Marnie at the window waving goodbye to her.

== Publication ==
When Marnie Was There was first published in 1967 by Collins. The first edition was illustrated by Peggy Fortnum. The cover was in colour, and throughout the book there were black-and-white illustrations representing moments in the story. For instance, an image depicted in chapter 18, "When Edward Came", depicts Anna and Marnie lying together in tall grass.

The book was reprinted as a mass-market paperback under the Armada Lions imprint in 1971. Translation rights to the book were sold in 10 countries in 2016, including Japan, Italy, Spain and China, and was reprinted by HarperCollins.

== Themes ==
I am Anna of course, and Marnie is my mother. My mother was always un‑get‑atable. Without meaning to, she always let me down. I found this extremely difficult to forgive, for without realising parents are in the same boat as yourself, that they are children, too, you can't forgive them for being frail and human. But until you learn to forgive, you yourself are crippled, can't begin to grow up. Through writing Marnie I faced the truth and found understanding. It made things a lot better.

— Joan G. Robinson, 1969 interview with Hannah Carter in The Guardian.

When Marnie Was There focuses on Anna's loneliness, her struggle to accept love, and forgiveness. Robinson wrote the novel based on her experiences of alienation and loneliness in her childhood, and said that she modelled the relationship between Anna and Marnie after her own relationship with her mother, where Robinson considered herself as Anna and her mother as Marnie, who is depicted in the story as having an elusive presence and an unreachable emotional state. Robinson explained that writing the character of Marnie helped her forgive her mother, and accept she was "frail and human". Adolescent psychologist Chau-Yee Lo wrote that the most important moment of the story to be when Anna forgives Marnie before she says she can no longer see her anymore, which profoundly transforms Anna emotionally. Lo commented that "in order to grow, Anna has to relinquish something, let go of an old way of relating. She has to mourn".

Writer Peter Vansittart wrote that the novel helped establish Robinson's reputation as a serious writer, breaking away from her earlier works which were written for very young children, with her ability to write lonely and sensitive young girls. Vansittart described the novel, along with Robinson's later works, as exemplary in its directness of depicting the psychological profile of a girl who feels she is misunderstood, spoils everything, stores up vindictive thoughts, is resentful, expects disappointment, and endures "the dreamy poetry of growing up."

== Style ==
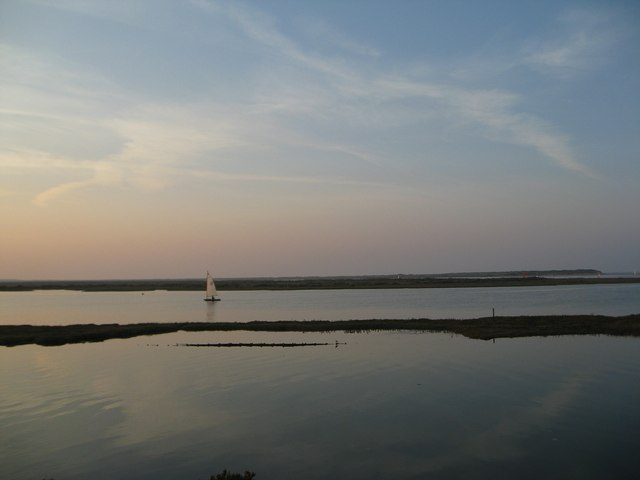
A seaside creek at sunset. The story's idyllic imagery is central to its mood and style.

When Marnie Was There is described as fantasy or "near-fantasy". The novel uses its seaside imagery and environment to control the mood of the story. British writer Naomi Lewis commented on chapters that deal with Marnie's disappearance, writing "the salt smell, the slapping of waves, the bird that seems to cry 'Pity me!' seem linked to the pleasure and the loss [of Marnie]". The setting also conveys the psychological state of Anna. Chau-Yee Lo wrote that "the saltiness of its sea air, the quiet, gentle rhythm of life which enables reflection, lending a sense of coming to the farthest end of the world as an expression of a search for one’s past".

Lewis described the novel as "beautifully planned, hauntingly written". Lewis also praised the pairing of humour to Anna's "brooding and unforthcoming" behaviour, as well as how the story's conclusion was successful in keeping track of the story's theme. Jean MacGibbon observed that certain plot threads took on "more than a hint of the supernatural". MacGibbon described Anna's past being revealed as a "satisfying climax".

Elaine Moss described it as an "extraordinarily potent fantasy" and said that the resolution was "intensely moving". Claire Tomalin described the novel as "exceptionally charming, sentimentally satisfying end and all". Madalynne Schoefeld praised the "neat storyline and the fascination of almost an almost-fantasy". Kirkus Reviews questioned the plausibility of events that result in Anna learning Marnie is her grandmother, describing it as a "strangling denouement", and instead considered Anna's reconciliation with her foster mother to be the more worthwhile aspect of the story.

== Reception ==
The novel received generally positive reviews, and it was shortlisted for the Carnegie Medal in 1967. It was reviewed in The Times Literary Supplement, New Statesman, The Spectator and The Observer. US reviews appeared beginning in 1968 in School Library Journal and Kirkus Reviews. An obituary for Robinson in The Daily Telegraph in 1988 reflected on the novel as having "one of the most touching and satisfying denouements in children's literature", and regarded it as a modern classic. The novel experienced another surge of popularity beginning in 2014, when an animated adaptation by Studio Ghibli brought new attention to the story.

== Adaptations ==
In 1971, BBC1 London adapted the novel to television for the children's book reading programme Jackanory. The book was read by Ann Bell, with filming and photography staged in Burnham Overy. It ran as five episodes, each 15 minutes, from 8 to 12 November.

In 2006, BBC Radio 4 adapted the novel as a radio play for an episode of The Saturday Play. It was dramatised by Beaty Rubens and directed by David Hunter, and included voices of Georgina Hagen (Anna) and Juliet Aaltonen (Marnie).

In 2014, Studio Ghibli released an animated adaption of the book, with the story set in Hokkaido. The anime was directed by Hiromasa Yonebayashi. Studio Ghibli founder Hayao Miyazaki had previously recommended the book.
