= Burnham Norton Friary =

Ruined friary in Norfolk, England

Coordinates: 52.9509°N 0.7348°E

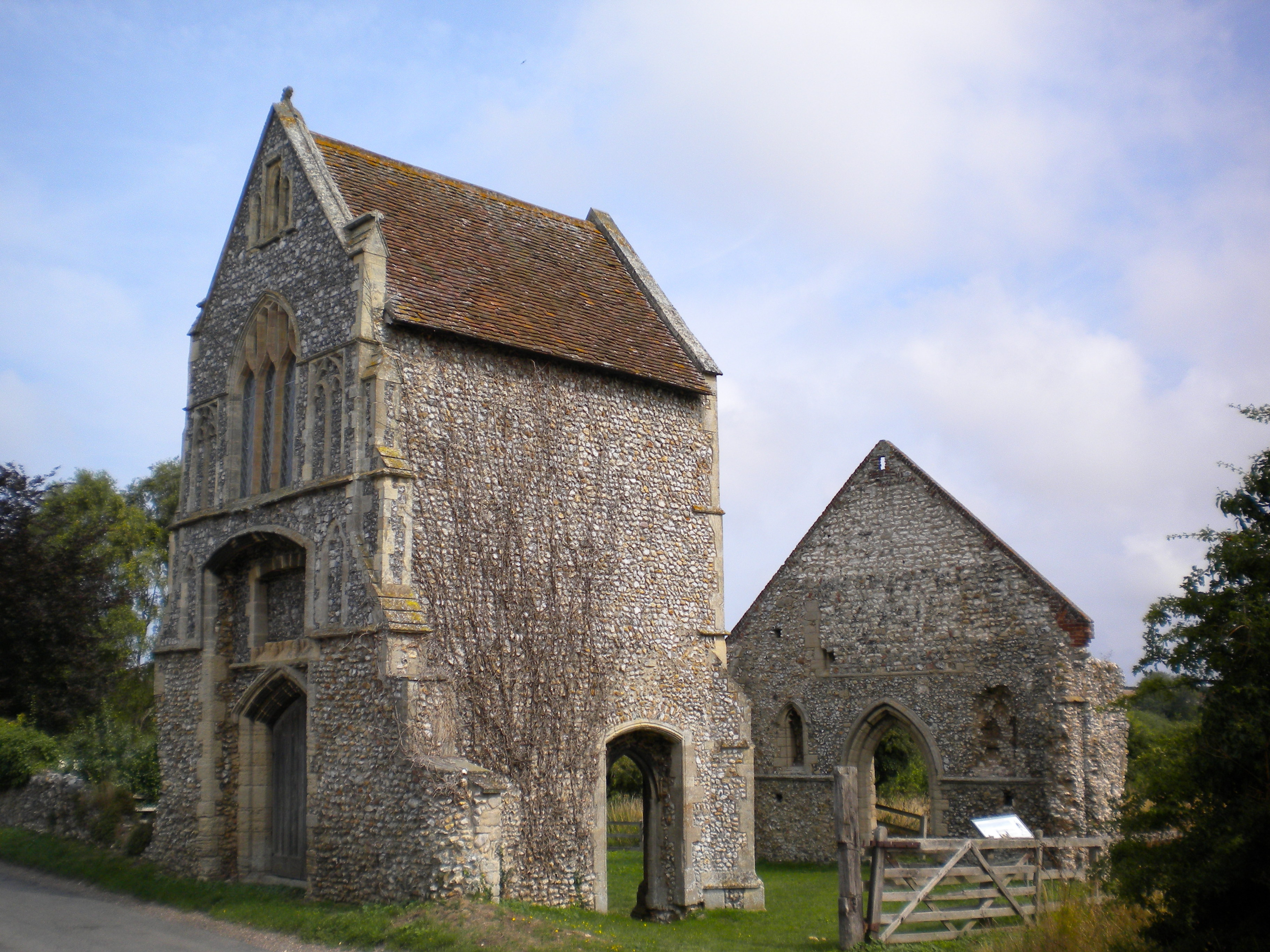

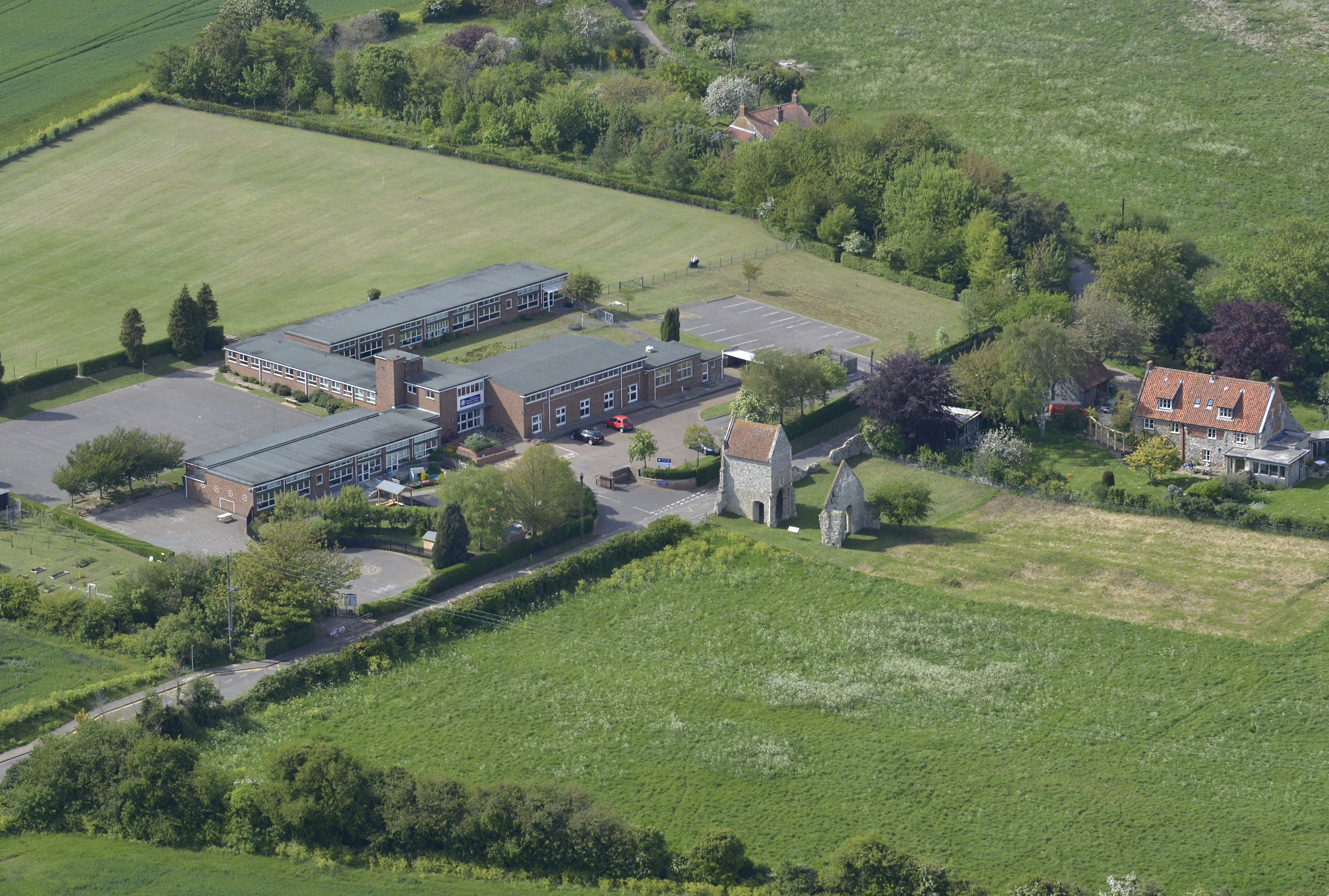
Aerial view, with the Friary centre-right

Burnham Norton Friary was a Carmelite (White Friars) friary near Burnham Market in Norfolk, England. It is now a ruin.

The friary was founded by Sir William Calthorp and Sir Ralph Hemenhale in 1241, the first Carmelite monastery to be founded following the expulsion of the order from Mount Carmel in Sinai in 1238. The theologian monk Robert Bale was prior of Burnham Norton for a time until his death in 1503. The friary was closed down in 1538, when occupied by only four poor monks, as part of the Dissolution of the Monasteries under King Henry VIII and passed undamaged into the ownership of Sir Richard Gresham.

The grade I listed ruined gatehouse; the adjacent grade II* listed free-standing gable end of an unknown building remain; the almost intact precinct wall and the church still remain. The free-standing gable end’s closeness to the gatehouse suggests it was not part of the friary church.
