= Joan G. Robinson =

English novelist and illustrator (1910–1988)

Joan Mary Gale Robinson
- Born: Joan Mary Gale Thomas; 10 February 1910; Gerrards Cross, Buckinghamshire, England
- Died: 20 August 1988 (aged 78); King's Lynn, Norfolk
- Occupations: children's writer, illustrator
- Spouse: Richard Gavin Robinson (m. 1941)
- Writing career
- Language: English
- Period: 1939–1978
- Notable works: A Stands for Angel (1939); Teddy Robinson (1953); When Marnie Was There (1967)

Joan Mary Gale Robinson (née Thomas; 10 February 1910 – 20 August 1988) was a British author and illustrator of children's books.

== Profile ==
She published her first book for children in 1939. She married writer and illustrator Richard Gavin Robinson in 1941. They lived in King's Lynn, Norfolk.

When Marnie Was There (1967), her first young adult novel, was shortlisted for the Carnegie Medal that year. Hayao Miyazaki selected Marnie as one of his fifty recommended children's books, and Studio Ghibli adapted it into a film of the same name.

== Select bibliography ==
=== For children ===
- Thomas, Joan Gale (1939). A Stands for Angel. London: Mowbray. OCLC 18756677.
- Thomas, Joan Gale (1948). God of All Things. London: Mowbray. OCLC 503832196.
- Robinson, J. G. (1953). Teddy Robinson. London: George G. Harrap & Co. OCLC 771729290.
- Robinson, J. G. (1957). Mary–Mary. London: George G. Harrap & Co. OCLC 504362374.

=== For young adults ===
- Robinson, Joan G.; Fortnum, Peggy (illus.) (1967). When Marnie Was There. London: Collins. OCLC 504362484.
- Robinson, Joan G.; Seward, Prudence (illus.) (1969). Charley (aka The Girl Who Ran Away). London: Collins. OCLC 115343.
- Robinson, Joan G.; Hughes, Shirley (illus.) (1972). The House in the Square. London: Collins. ISBN 0-00-184305-2. OCLC 1962038.
- Robinson, Joan G.; Ambrus, Glenys (illus.) (1977). The Summer Surprise. London: Collins. ISBN 0-00-184350-8. OCLC 59787931.
- Robinson, Joan G. (1978). Meg and Maxie (aka The Sea Witch or The Dark House of the Sea Witch). London: Gollancz. ISBN 0-575-02555-7. OCLC 16428637.
