= Burnham Overy Staithe Windmill =

Windmill in Burnham Overy, Norfolk, England

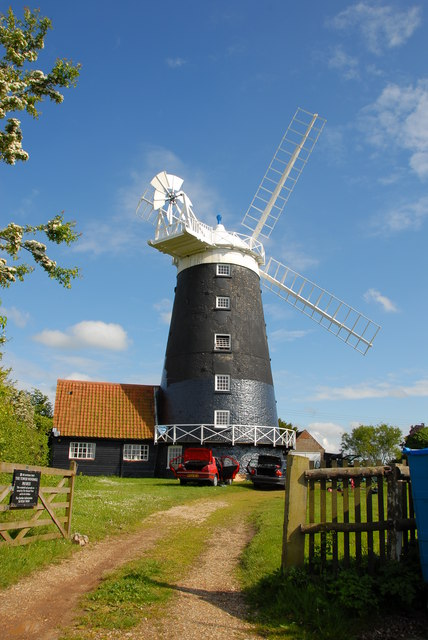
- Burnham Overy Staithe Mill
- Interactive map of Burnham Overy Staithe Windmill

Origin
- Mill name: Burnham Overy Staithe Mill
- Mill location: TF 8378 4376
- Coordinates: 52°57′35″N 0°44′05″E
- Operator: National Trust
- Year built: 1816

Information
- Purpose: Corn mill
- Type: Tower mill
- Storeys: Six storeys
- No. of sails: Four sails
- Type of sails: Double patent sails
- Windshaft: Cast iron
- Winding: Fantail
- Fantail blades: Six blades
- No. of pairs of millstones: Three pairs

Burnham Overy Staithe Windmill is a Grade II* listed building tower mill at Burnham Overy Staithe, Norfolk, England which has been converted to holiday accommodation.

== History ==
Burnham Overy Staithe Mill was built in 1816 for Edmund Savory, a miller who was running a watermill on the River Burn known as the Lower Mill. Savory worked the mill until his death on 9 February 1827, when it passed to his son John.

John Savory worked the mill until his death on 27 September 1863, and the mill passed to his son, also named John. In 1869, a law was passed that all trade horses should be licensed. John Savory was convicted in 1870 and fined £5 for having one more horse than he held a licence for. He was again convicted in 1873 and fined £5 for the same offence. The mill was offered for sale by auction on 23 June 1888 at the Norfolk Hotel, Norwich. The premises comprising a steam mill powered by a 16 horsepower (12 kW) steam engine driving four pairs of millstones, the watermill driving three pairs of millstones and the windmill, also driving three pairs of millstones. As well as the mills there was a 25-coomb maltings, granaries and various other farm buildings, together with over 40 acres (16 ha) of land. The lot was unsold, and Savory worked the mill until 1900 when it was sold to Sidney Dewing. In 1910, the mill was sold to Sidney Everett, a maltster of Wells-next-the-Sea. In 1914, the mill was tailwinded. It was last worked in 1919. In 1926, the mill was sold to Hugh Hughes, an architect from Grantchester, Cambridgeshire. Hughes had the mill, which had been stripped of machinery by this time, converted to holiday accommodation.

In 1957, restoration work was carried out by Thompson's, millwrights of Alford, Lincolnshire. A new cap with a gallery, stocks and sails were fitted and the stage was replaced. The mill was given to the National Trust in 1958. In December 1978, the National Trust published plans to restore the mill to working order. This would have involved making the cap able to turn into wind, and the provision of new internal machinery and the conversion of associated building to a shop, along with the provision of car parking facilities. There was opposition from local people, although West Norfolk District Council were in favour of the plans. They were directed by Norfolk County Council to refuse the application due to the inadequate highway in the locality which did not have the capacity to cope with large numbers of visitors. The mill was renovated internally to meet fire safety regulations in 1981. The sails and stocks were removed in 1983 for replacement. Two new 62 feet (18.90 m) long stocks of Jamaican Pitch pine were fitted on 17 July 1985, and four new sails the following day. The new stocks and sails cost £26,500.

== Description ==
Burnham Overy Staithe Mill is a six-storey tower mill with an ogee cap with gallery. The cap is winded by a fantail and the four Double Patent sails of 12 bays are carried on a cast-iron windshaft. The windshaft also carries a wooden clasp arm brake wheel. It drove three pairs of millstones.

== Millers ==
- Edmund Savory 1816–27
- John Savory 1827–63
- John Savory, Jr 1863–1900
- Sidney Dewing 1900–10
- Sidney Everitt 1910–21

== Public access ==
Burnham Overy Staithe Mill is available as a holiday let on a self-catering basis.

== In popular culture ==
The silo in the 2014 anime film When Marnie Was There is based on the Burnham Overy Staithe Windmill.
