= Tilney St Lawrence =

Village in Norfolk, England

Coordinates: 52.70008°N 0.29079°E

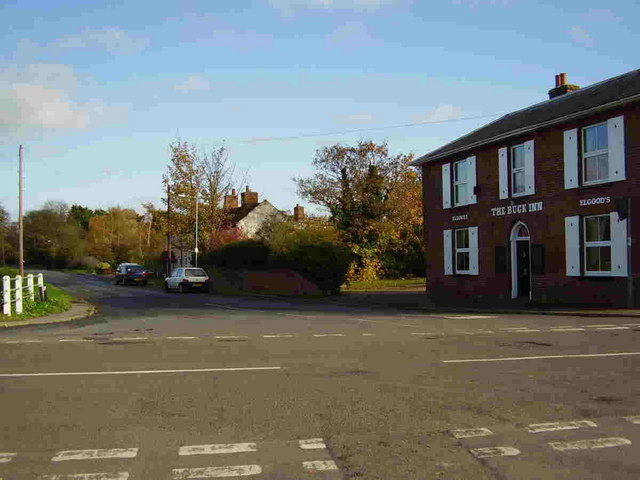
- The Buck Inn, Tilney St Lawrence, Norfolk

- Location within Norfolk
- Area: 20.48 km^{2} (7.91 sq mi)
- Population: 1,576 (parish, 2011 census)
  - Density: 77/km^{2} (200/sq mi)
- OS grid reference: TF5413
  - London: 104 miles (167 km)
- Civil parish: Tilney St Lawrence
- District: King's Lynn and West Norfolk
- Shire county: Norfolk
- Region: East
- Country: England
- Sovereign state: United Kingdom
- Post town: KING'S LYNN
- Postcode district: PE34
- Dialling code: 01945
- Police: Norfolk
- Fire: Norfolk
- Ambulance: East of England
- UK Parliament: South West Norfolk

Tilney St Lawrence is a village and a civil parish in the English county of Norfolk The village is 52.3 miles (84.2 km) west of Norwich, 9.7 miles (15.6 km) south-south-west of King's Lynn and 104 miles (167 km) north of London. The nearest town is Wisbech which is 8.3 miles (13.4 km) west-south-west of the village. The village lies to the south of the route of the A47 between Peterborough and Kings Lynn. The parish of Tilney St Lawrence in the 2001 census had a population of 1,465, increasing to 1,576 at the 2011 Census. For the purposes of local government, the parish falls within the district of King's Lynn and West Norfolk.

== Description ==
Tilney St Lawrence is located within a large parish of the same name, situated in the West Norfolk Local Government District. The parish has an area of 2,041 hectares (5,043 acres). The parish also contains the villages of Tilney St Lawrence, Tilney cum Islington and Islington. The parish that exists today used to be two separate parishes. They were Tilney St Lawrence and Tilney-cum-Islington which were combined in 1935 to form the fourth largest parish in the Marshland region. The name Tilney is thought to derive from the Old English for Tibba's homestead, and St Lawrence refers to the dedication of the village parish church. The name Islington is thought to derive from the Old English for enclosure of Elesa's people.

== History ==
=== The Roman period ===
At one time it is thought that there were two Roman waterways that ran to a junction within the parish. The Aylmer Canal was constructed between 43 AD and 409 AD and was used for transport and communication through the local area. The environment around the canal during the Roman period of occupation is uncertain, but it may have been waterlogged silts or peat lands. It is thought that the canal was partially washed away by a sea inundation during the 2nd or 3rd century. The Spice Hills Canal, built around the same period, ran along a south-west, north-east line and appears to approach and almost certainly join the Aylmer canal. Today the canals appear visible as an earthworks on aerial photographs.

=== Medieval ===
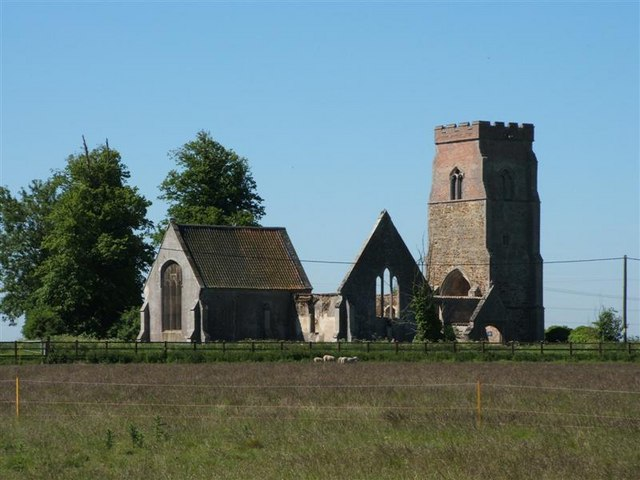
The ruined church of St Mary's Islington

The village of Tilney St Lawrence did not exist in its own right at the time of the Domesday Book although the settlement of Islington, which lies in the very northeast corner of this parish, is listed. Today very little is left of the settlement of Islington, which is thought to have been a populous and a valuable Late Saxon settlement, with a number of salt houses and a church. This church is likely to have been the present day St Mary's Church, which lies redundant and largely ruined. By the late 13th century, Tilney St Lawrence had overtaken Islington as the main settlement within the parish and had a church dedicated to St Lawrence.

== Governance ==
Tilney St Lawrence is part of the electoral ward called St Lawrence. The population of this ward at the 2011 census was 2,467.

== Amenities ==
The nearest railway station is at Watlington Railway Station for the Fen Line which runs between King's Lynn and Cambridge.

=== Saint Lawrence Parish Church ===
This is a plain looking marshland church with the outside mainly rendered in concrete. The church was almost entirely rebuilt in 1846. It has a cruciform plan and a somewhat disproportionate appearance, the chancel being much higher than the rest of the church. The tower, though restored, is largely in its original decorated form. A plaque inside records that it was surmounted by a spire during the restoration, but this has now gone. The church has a plain marble font and a trefoiled piscina with an old credence shelf. The new transept incorporates two older arches. There is also a small proportion of the original screen remaining.

== Notable people ==
=== John Aylmer ===
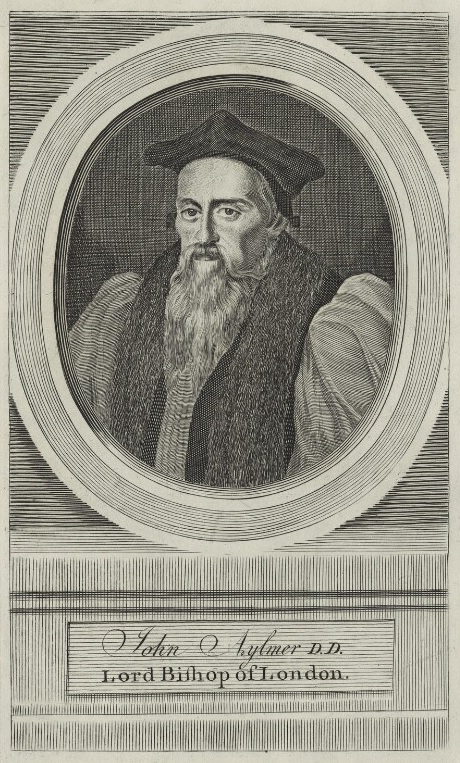
John Aylmer, Bishop of London

John Aylmer was born in the village at Aylmer Hall in 1521. He was a great friend of Henry Grey, 1st Duke of Suffolk, Marquis of Dorset who sent him to study at Cambridge where he became a fellow of Queens' College. Grey made him his chaplain and tutor to his daughter Lady Jane Grey. This exceptionally gifted girl told Roger Ascham that her achievements were due to Mr Aylmer, who teaches me so gently, so pleasantly, and with such fair allurements to learning that I think all the time nothing while I am with him. It appears that this gentle and encouraging tutor became, as bishop of London from 1577 until his death in 1594, increasingly unpopular because of his arbitrary and unconciliatory disposition. His work, particularly his characterisation of England as a mixed monarchy, would be important to later English constitutionalists.
