= Coxford, Norfolk =

Village in Norfolk, England

Coordinates: 52.8167°N 0.7°E

Coxford
- Location within Norfolk
- Civil parish: Coxford
- District: King's Lynn and West Norfolk
- Shire county: Norfolk
- Region: East
- Country: England
- Sovereign state: United Kingdom

Coxford is a village in the English county of Norfolk.

The village is on the south side of the A 148 King's Lynn to Cromer road. The River Tat, which is a tributary of the River Wensum, runs through the village.

Close to the village are the grade II* listed remains of the Augustinian St Mary's Priory.
