= Coxford Priory =

Former Augustinian priory in Norfolk, England

Coordinates: 52.8270°N 0.7417°E

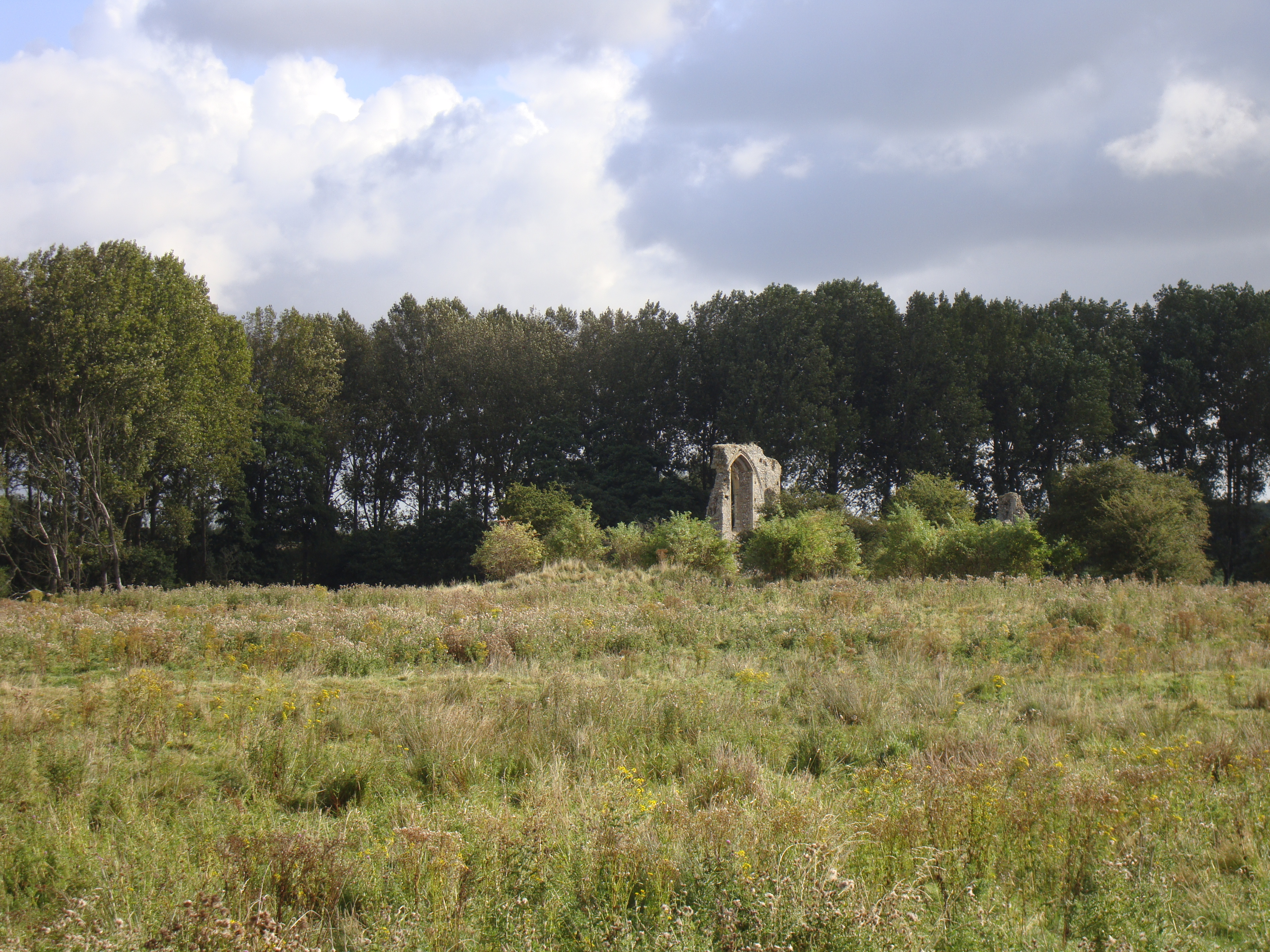
The remains of Coxford Priory

Coxford Priory or Broomsthorpe Priory was a monastic house in Norfolk, England.

An Augustinian Canons Regular establishment, initially founded around 1140 at the church of St Mary, East Rudham by William Cheney, the community was transferred to a new site at Coxford c.1216. The building there was constructed of flint with stone dressings and is now a grade II* listed ruin.

The priory was dissolved in 1536.

== See also ==
- List of monastic houses in Norfolk
- List of monastic houses in England
