= East Rudham =

Village in Norfolk, England

Coordinates: 52.81898°N 0.70841°E

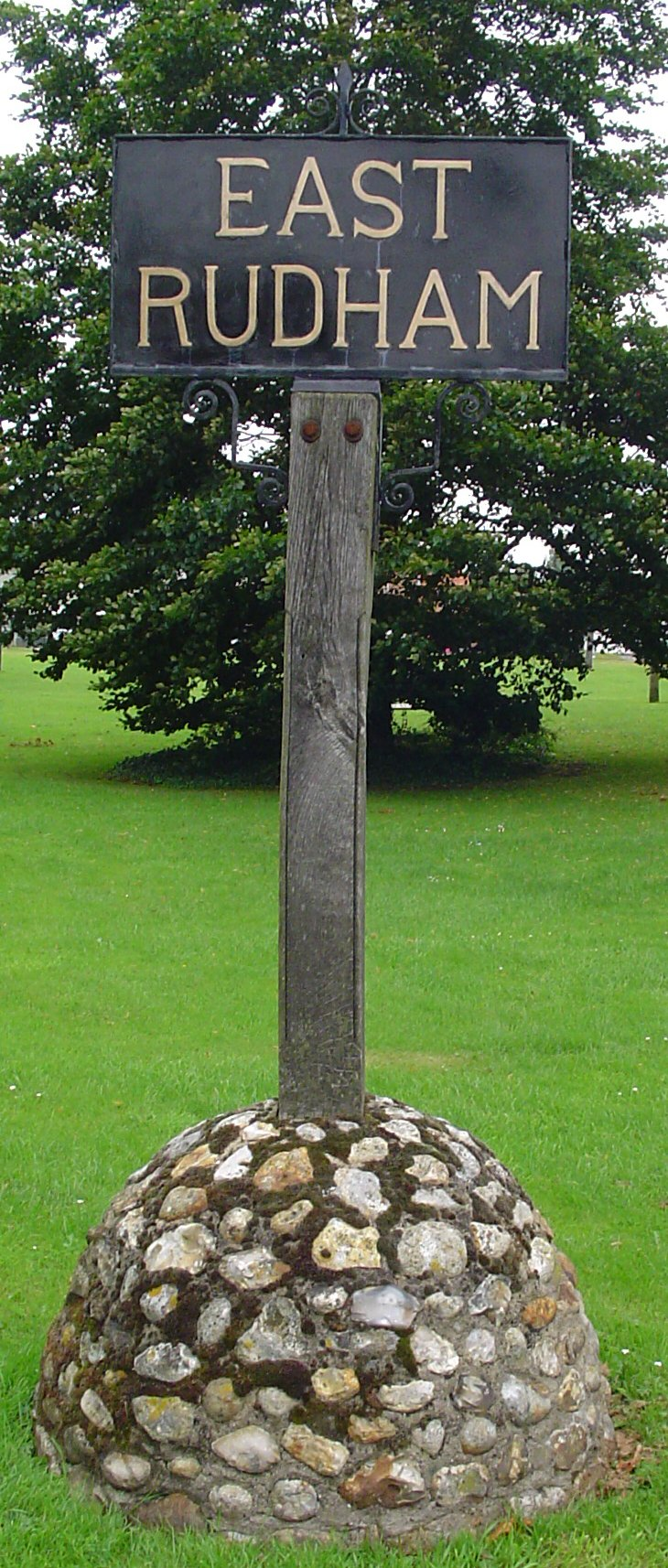
- Signpost in East Rudham

- Location within Norfolk
- Area: 6.93 sq mi (17.9 km^{2})
- Population: 553 (2021 census)
  - Density: 80/sq mi (31/km^{2})
- OS grid reference: TF826280
- Civil parish: East Rudham
- District: King's Lynn and West Norfolk
- Shire county: Norfolk
- Region: East
- Country: England
- Sovereign state: United Kingdom
- Post town: KING'S LYNN
- Postcode district: PE31
- Dialling code: 01485
- Police: Norfolk
- Fire: Norfolk
- Ambulance: East of England
- UK Parliament: North West Norfolk

East Rudham is a village and civil parish in the English county of Norfolk.

The village is located 14 miles (23 km) north-east of King's Lynn and 28 miles (45 km) north-west of Norwich. It includes the former parish of Broomsthorpe.

== History ==
East Rudham's name is of Anglo-Saxon origin and derives from the Old English for 'Rudda's' homestead or village.

Several Iron Age and Roman artefacts have been found close to East Rudham, and there is further evidence to suggest a small Roman settlement was based on the modern village.

In the Domesday Book, East and West Rudham are recorded together as a settlement of 67 households in the hundred of Brothercross. In 1086, the village was divided between the East Anglian estates of Alan of Brittany, William de Warenne and Peter de Valognes.

East Rudham Railway Station opened in 1880 as a stop on the Midland and Great Northern Joint Railway between South Lynn and Melton Constable. The station closed in 1959.

During the Second World War, a starfish site was created on nearby Coxford Heath designed to draw Luftwaffe bombers away from King's Lynn.

== Geography ==
According to the 2021 census, East Rudham has a population of 553 people which shows an increase from the 541 people listed in the 2011 census.

East Rudham is located on the A148, between King's Lynn and Cromer.

== St. Mary's Church ==
East Rudham's parish church is dedicated to Saint Mary and was rebuilt in the mid-Nineteenth Century in the Perpendicular style after the tower collapsed into the nave. St. Mary's is located on Fakenham Road and has been Grade II listed since 1953.

St. Mary's boasts a font dating from 1852 as well as a brass plaque and a churchtower clock which commemorate the Diamond Jubilee of Queen Victoria.

== Governance ==
East Rudham is part of the electoral ward of Bircham with Rudhams for local elections and is part of the district of King's Lynn and West Norfolk.

The village's national constituency is North West Norfolk which has been represented by the Conservative's James Wild MP since 2010.

== War Memorial ==
East and West Rudham's War Memorial takes the form of an obelisk topped with a wheel cross, located beside the A148. It lists the following names from East Rudham for the First World War:

Rank	Name	Unit	Date of death	Burial/Commemoration
Cpl.	H. Walter Wake	5th Bn., Norfolk Regiment	28 Aug. 1915	Helles Memorial
LCpl.	Bertie R. Huggins	9th Bn., Norfolk Regt.	29 Apr. 1917	St. Patrick's Cemetery
Dvr.	Claude Whitby	Att. 20 Bde., Royal Horse Artillery	16 Nov. 1918	Hadra War Cemetery
Gnr.	Alfred Vertigen	331 Bde., Royal Field Artillery	25 Mar. 1918	Abbeville Cemetery
Gnr.	William E. Hammond	64 Siege Bty., Royal Garrison Artillery	25 Jun. 1917	Faubourg Cemetery
Gnr.	Frank Green	290 Siege Bty., R.G.A.	4 Oct. 1918	Raillencourt Cemetery
Pte.	Albert E. Overland	1st Bn., East Surrey Regiment	8 Oct. 1917	Lijssenthoek Cemetery
Pte.	Frederick W. Billing	13th Bn., Essex Regiment	28 Apr. 1917	Arras Memorial
Pte.	Herbert Gregory	13th Bn., Royal Fusiliers	29 Apr. 1917	Chili Trench Cemetery
Pte.	Robert W. Nicholls	7th Bn., Leicestershire Regiment	13 Jul. 1918	Seda-Torcy Cemetery
Pte.	James E. Daniels	1st Bn., Norfolk Regiment	10 Apr. 1916	Faubourg Cemetery
Pte.	Charles E. Butcher	5th Bn., Norfolk Regt.	19 Apr. 1917	Gaza War Cemetery
Pte.	Cecil E. Strangleman	5th Bn., Norfolk Regt.	19 Apr. 1917	Gaza War Cemetery
Pte.	Ernest A. Bobbitt	1st Bn., Northamptonshire Regiment	24 Oct. 1918	Vadencourt Cemetery
Pte.	Albert L. Dawson	6th Bn., Northamptonshire Regt.	19 Oct. 1917	Dozinghem Cemetery
Pte.	Edric J. Couzens	1st Bn., Worcestershire Regiment	8 Jul. 1916	Gordon Dump Cemetery

The memorial also lists the following names for the Second World War:

Rank	Name	Unit	Date of death	Burial
Lt.	Henry R. Newton	Royal Norfolk Regiment	21 Apr. 1944	Cassino War Cemetery
Rev.	Henry T. Wagg MiD	Army Chaplain's Department	19 Jul. 1944	Hermanville War Cemetery
Cpl.	Charles H. Riches	1st Bn., Coldstream Guards	22 May 1940	Wilsele Churchyard
LAC	Norman F. Kirk	Royal Air Force	26 May 1942	East Rudham Cemetery
LCpl.	Gordon L. Norman	5th Bn., Royal Norfolk Regiment	29 Jul. 1943	Kanchanaburi War Cemetery
Gnr.	George W. Twite	1 Light Regt., Royal Artillery	6 Dec. 1941	Alamein Memorial
Pte.	Cecil E. Strangleman	2nd Bn., Essex Regiment	3 Nov. 1944	Bergen op Zoom Cemetery
Pte.	D. Thomas Woodard	2nd Bn., Royal Norfolk Regiment	14 Apr. 1944	Kohima War Cemetery
