= Scapular of Our Lady of Walsingham =

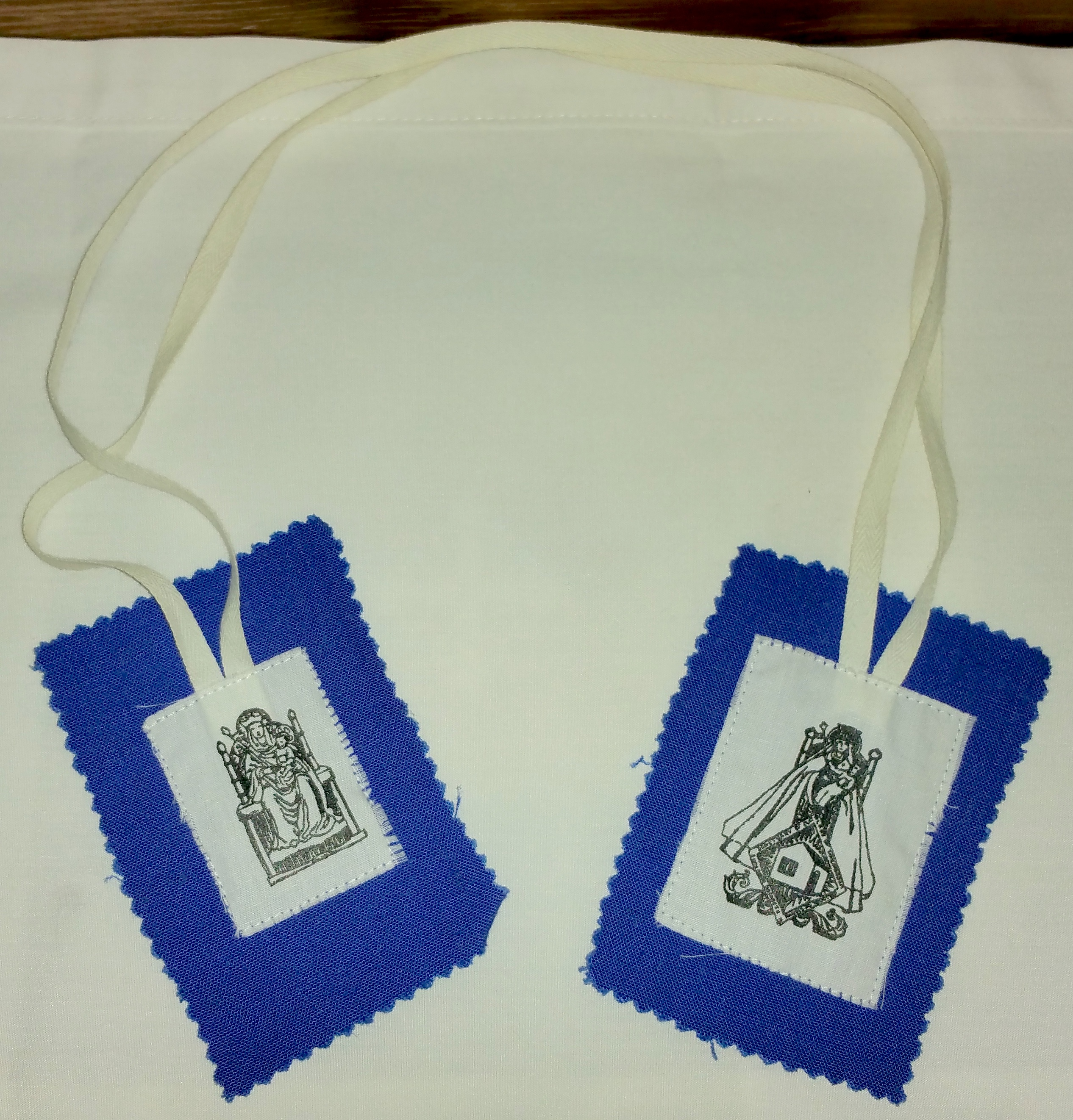
The Scapular of Our Lady of Walsingham, worn by those who are members of The Society of Our Lady of Walsingham and the Associates

The Scapular of Our Lady of Walsingham is an Anglican devotional scapular associated with those who venerate Our Lady of Walsingham.

This Anglican devotional scapular was most likely developed independently, although it may be historically related to the Theatine Blue Scapular.

In some cells of the Society of Our Lady of Walsingham, Christians who complete their investiture receive this sacramental. Although the Society of Our Lady of Walsingham and the Associates is Anglican, it is ecumenical in its outlook and thus allows any baptized Christian to join its ranks.

== See also ==
- Society of Mary (Anglican)
- Scapular of St. Benedict
