= The National Pilgrimage =

Annual pilgrimage to a shrine in Norfolk, UK

The National Pilgrimage (also known as The National) is an annual pilgrimage to the Anglican Shrine of Our Lady of Walsingham in the village of Little Walsingham in the English county of Norfolk. The first pilgrimage took place in 1923 in the parish church of St Mary and All Saints, Little Walsingham. The shrine, which had been destroyed in the Dissolution of the Monasteries, had been revived in the church the previous year by the Vicar, Fr Hope Patten. The annual pilgrimage was established in 1938, when the statue of Our Lady was moved to a new shrine church. Originally known as the Whit Monday Pilgrimage, it has been known as The National Pilgrimage since 1959.

== Origins ==
The churchmanship of St Mary and All Saints became significantly more Catholic in 1882 when the musician-priest George Ratcliffe Woodward was appointed Vicar. A later Vicar, Fr Edgar Reeves, introduced a statue of Our Lady. By 1919 the Church Times was able to describe it as "the famous pilgrimage church of our Lady". At the end of his incumbency in 1920, Reeves hosted a pilgrimage for the Feast of Corpus Christi during which the Eucharist was celebrated with a procession and incense.

Patten, who arrived in Walsingham as Vicar in 1921, was a firm Anglican Papalist, convinced of the need to restore pre-Reformation devotions. Our Lady of Walsingham was such a devotion. On 6 July 1922, with great ceremony and the ringing of church bells, a copy of the throned and crowned mediaeval image of Our Lady of Walsingham was revealed in a side chapel.

== The first Whitsuntide pilgrimage ==
The first Whitsuntide pilgrimage took place the following year, 1923. It was organised by the League of Our Lady, an Anglican Marian devotional society, which later merged with the Confraternity of Our Lady to form the Society of Mary. The pilgrimage began at the London Anglo-Catholic church of St Magnus-the-Martyr on the Tuesday in Whitsuntide, with the Marian hymns Ave Maris Stella, Ye who own the faith of Jesus and Her virgin eyes.

There were further pilgrimages throughout the 1920s organised by the League of Our Lady, but they did not keep to Whitsuntide week. In 1927 there were four pilgrimages, but it was the May pilgrimage that appears to have been most prominent. The first episcopal attendance at one of the May pilgrimages was in 1925, by Mowbray O'Rorke, who had resigned as Bishop of Accra (in what was then the Gold Coast) the previous year.

The Bishop of Norwich, Bertram Pollock, was unimpressed by the revival of Marianism, and, in 1930, insisted that Patten remove the image from the church. Undeterred, and with financial support from the Anglo-Catholic layman Sir William Milner Bt, Patten bought a plot of land elsewhere in the village to build a new Holy House enclosed in a small church. Crucially, this was on land not owned by the Church of England, and, therefore, outside the control of the Bishop. The new Holy House was opened in 1931 and was built as a replica of the original shrine, destroyed on the orders of Henry VIII. The translation of the image of Our Lady to the new shrine took place on 15 October 1931. It began with a High Mass sung by Bishop O'Rorke (by then the Rector of St Nicholas, Blakeney). After Benediction, the statue was carried in procession to the new shrine; the procession was half a mile long.

== The Whit Monday Pilgrimages ==
The shrine church was extended in 1938. Bishop O'Rorke, who had led celebrations for the Translation of the image in 1931, blessed the new nave and chapels on 6 June 1938, which was Whit Monday. As a result, from 1938 onwards the pilgrimage took place on the Whit Monday bank holiday, and was thereafter known as the Whit Monday Pilgrimage. The 1939 Whit Monday pilgrimage was a pilgrimage for peace (given the looming fear of war).

In 1941, the Church Times published a letter which, noting the "present difficulties in visiting Walsingham", asked readers to provide details of churches in London with local shrines of Our Lady of Walsingham. War-time travel restrictions had been partially relaxed by the end of that year, and a pilgrimage was organised in January 1942 by the Catholic League. The Whit Monday Pilgrimages were not held during the war years, although some small pilgrimages took place in 1943 and 1944. A pilgrimage took place in June 1945, after VE Day. The first large post-war Whit Monday Pilgrimage took place in 1946; the following year the Pilgrimage gained its second episcopal attendant, the Bishop of the Windward Islands (Horace Tonks). The 1948 Whit Monday Pilgrimage was held as a pilgrimage of reparation for the South Indian Schism, being the Anglo-Catholic term for the union of South Indian churches, which had taken place the previous year.

== The National ==
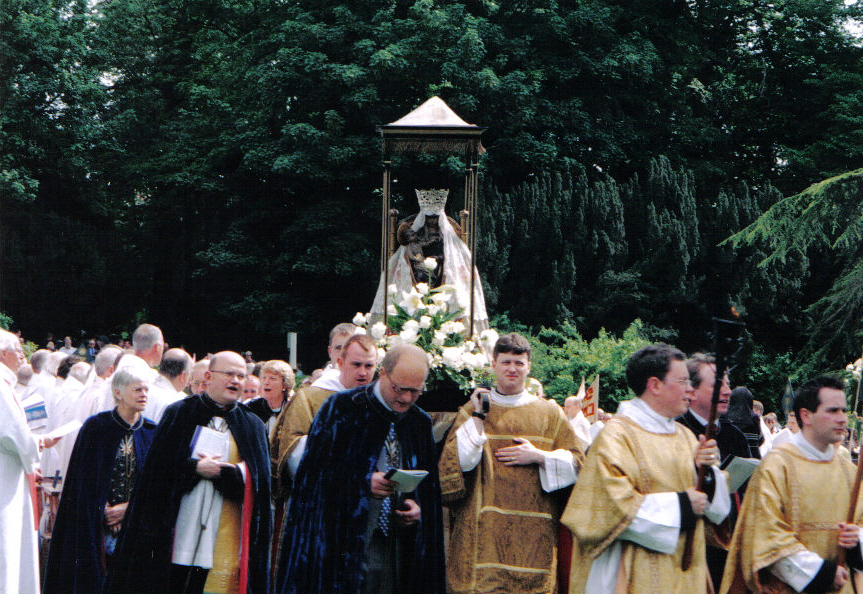
The statue of Our Lady of Walsingham in procession at the 2003 National Pilgrimage

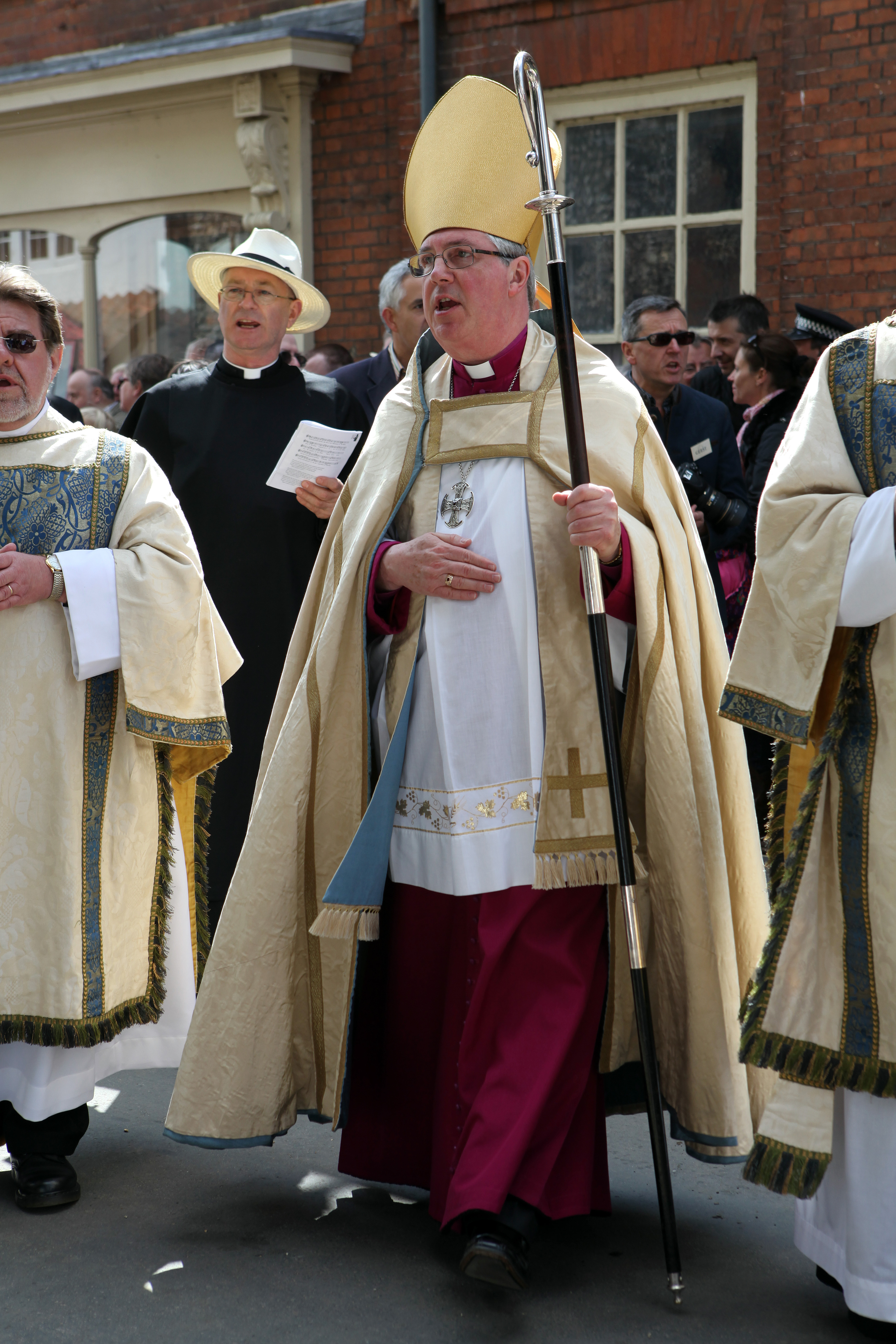
Graham James, former Bishop of Norwich, at the 2012 National Pilgrimage

The Whit Monday Pilgrimage was renamed the National Pilgrimage in 1959. It was renamed by Patrick Maitland, the Master of Lauderdale and the then President of the Church Union, to mark the Union's centenary. The 1973 National Pilgrimage was the last to be held in the Shrine grounds. Pressure of numbers meant that, initially on an experimental basis, from 1974 the Pilgrimage has been held in the Abbey grounds. The Pilgrimage consists of the journey to Walsingham, a High Mass, lunch in the Abbey grounds, and Procession and Benediction, before the journey home.

Whit Monday had been a bank holiday since 1871. It remained so until 1965 when, on a trial basis, it was moved to the last Monday in May and renamed the Spring Bank Holiday. This became permanent in 1971. The National has generally followed the movements of the Spring Bank Holiday, such as 2002 to the first Monday in June as the bank holiday moved because of the Queen's golden jubilee, and again in 2012 for the Queen's diamond jubilee. In 2022, due to the Queen's platinum jubilee, the National will be held on the May Day bank holiday.

There have been some other variations. In 1982 the National was moved to the August bank holiday, in order not to conflict with the visit of the Pope, John Paul II. In 2001 it was cancelled because of the foot-and-mouth outbreak. In 2020 it was cancelled because of the coronavirus pandemic, and replaced with an online pilgrimage. In 2021 the National took place in person, but with heavily restricted numbers in order to maintain social distancing, as well as being live streamed.

In recent years, by contrast with initial episcopal disapproval, Archbishops of Canterbury have attended the National, most recently Justin Welby in 2019. Rowan Williams attended when Archbishop in 2004, which was the second time an Archbishop of Canterbury attended. The first time had been in 1980 by Robert Runcie.

For 36 years from 1982 the Chief Steward of the National was Fr Beau Brandie. Brandie was a priest in Brighton, and each year he brought with him the Brighton Sea Cadets as an honour guard for the statue of Our Lady in procession.

== Protestant protests ==
A feature of the National is the presence of protestors declaiming Anglican "Popery". Protestors have been present since at least 1931, but have been formally organised since 1970. In 2004 a banner reading "The Bible. Cure for Sodomy" was sufficiently inflammatory that the police required it to be taken down. The protestors consider that the pilgrims are "idolators". Many of the protestors travel from Northern Ireland. The annual protest has been described as "a kind of Protestant pilgrimage".
