= Anglican devotions =

Private prayers and practices used by Anglican Christians

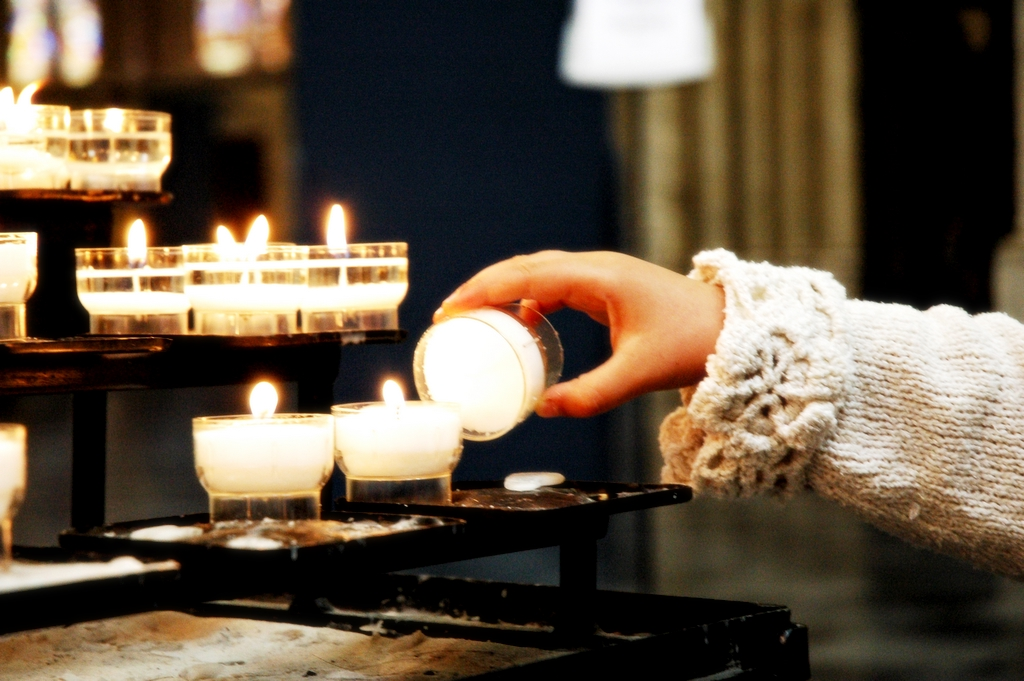
The lighting of a votive candle. These candles can be found in churches or home altars.

Anglican devotions are private prayers and practices used by Anglican Christians to promote spiritual growth and communion with God. Among members of the Anglican Communion, private devotional habits vary widely, depending on personal preference and on their affiliation with low-church or high-church parishes.

Private prayer and Bible reading are probably the most common practices of devout Anglicans outside church. Some base their private prayers on the Book of Common Prayer.

Devotional practices among people and parishes who self-identify as Anglo-Catholic will naturally be different from those Anglicans who are Evangelical. Anglo-Catholics are likely to follow devotional customs familiar to the majority of Christians that have roots in the early and mediaeval periods as well as the contemporary form of devotion. These include daily prayer, particularly the Daily Office, and meditative and contemplative devotions hallowed by the centuries, e.g. the Rosary, the Stations of the Cross and Benediction of the Blessed Sacrament. Increasingly, Anglo-Catholics are discovering the spiritual practices of Eastern Christianity, e.g. praying with icons and the use of the Jesus Prayer. Evangelical Anglicans have been strongly influenced by the Protestant Reformation and, in some cases, by pietistic, charismatic or Pentecostal habits.

== Book of Common Prayer ==
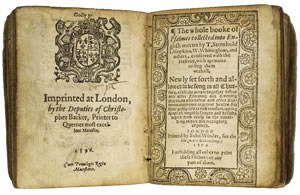
The 1596 Book of Common Prayer

The Book of Common Prayer was a foundational prayer book of Anglicanism when printed in 1549. The original was one of the instruments of the English Reformation. In addition to the authorized Prayer Book of the Church of England, the book by the tame issued in 1662, many member churches of the Anglican Communion have their own official versions, which may be used by individual Anglicans for their private devotions. Most Anglican churches, however, use contemporary alternatives to the Various editions of the Book of Common Prayer, such as Common Worship (Church of England), or the Book of Alternative Services (Anglican Church of Canada). The liturgies of the Episcopal church in the United States and the Church of Ireland use modern books each of which is named after the Book of Common Prayer.

Many devout Anglicans begin and end their day with the Daily Office of a prayer book, which includes the forms for morning and evening prayer, as well as suggested Bible readings appropriate to each. Some modern editions of the book of common prayer also add noonday and bedtime prayer as minor offices. Some Anglo-Catholics use forms of the Roman Catholic Daily Office, such as the Divine Office, or the forms contained in the Anglican Breviary.

The Litany in the Book of Common Prayer, or litanies from other sources, is also a devotion used for private or family prayer by some Anglicans.

Quiet Time, a time of prayer and Bible reflection is quite common among evangelical Anglicans, while Lectio Divina, a similar practice, is advocated by more Catholic-minded Anglicans.

== Veneration of saints ==
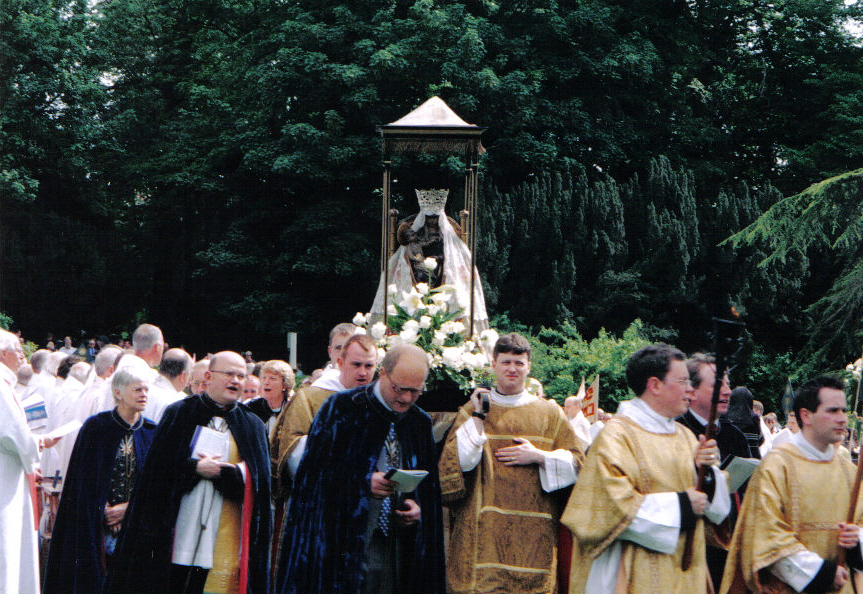
The procession during the Anglican National Pilgrimage to the Anglican Shrine of Our Lady of Walsingham in the county of Norfolk, England, proceeds through the ruined abbey, May 2003.

Although direct prayer to the saints is a practice that was continued in the first Litany in English, it was not particularly encouraged after the English Reformation. It is, however, an important part of Anglo-Catholics' public and private spiritual practices. In Anglo-Catholic theology, veneration is a type of honour distinct from the worship due to God alone. High church theologians have long used the terms latria for the sacrificial worship due to God alone, and dulia for the veneration given to saints and icons. They base this distinction on the conclusions of the Seventh Ecumenical Council (787), which also decreed that iconoclasm (forbidding icons and their veneration) is a heresy that amounts to a denial of the incarnation of Jesus. Prayer is directed to God; one prays with and for the saints as they pray with and for us through Christ to God.

Article XXII of the Thirty-nine Articles states the "Romish doctrine" of the invocation of saints in the 16th century was not grounded in Scripture, hence many low-church or broad-church Anglicans consider prayer to the saints to be unnecessary. One example of Anglo-Catholic veneration is the annual National Pilgrimage in honour of Our Lady of Walsingham (see picture). It was suspended in 1538 and revived in 1922 by some clergy and lay members of the Church of England.

== Anglican prayer beads ==
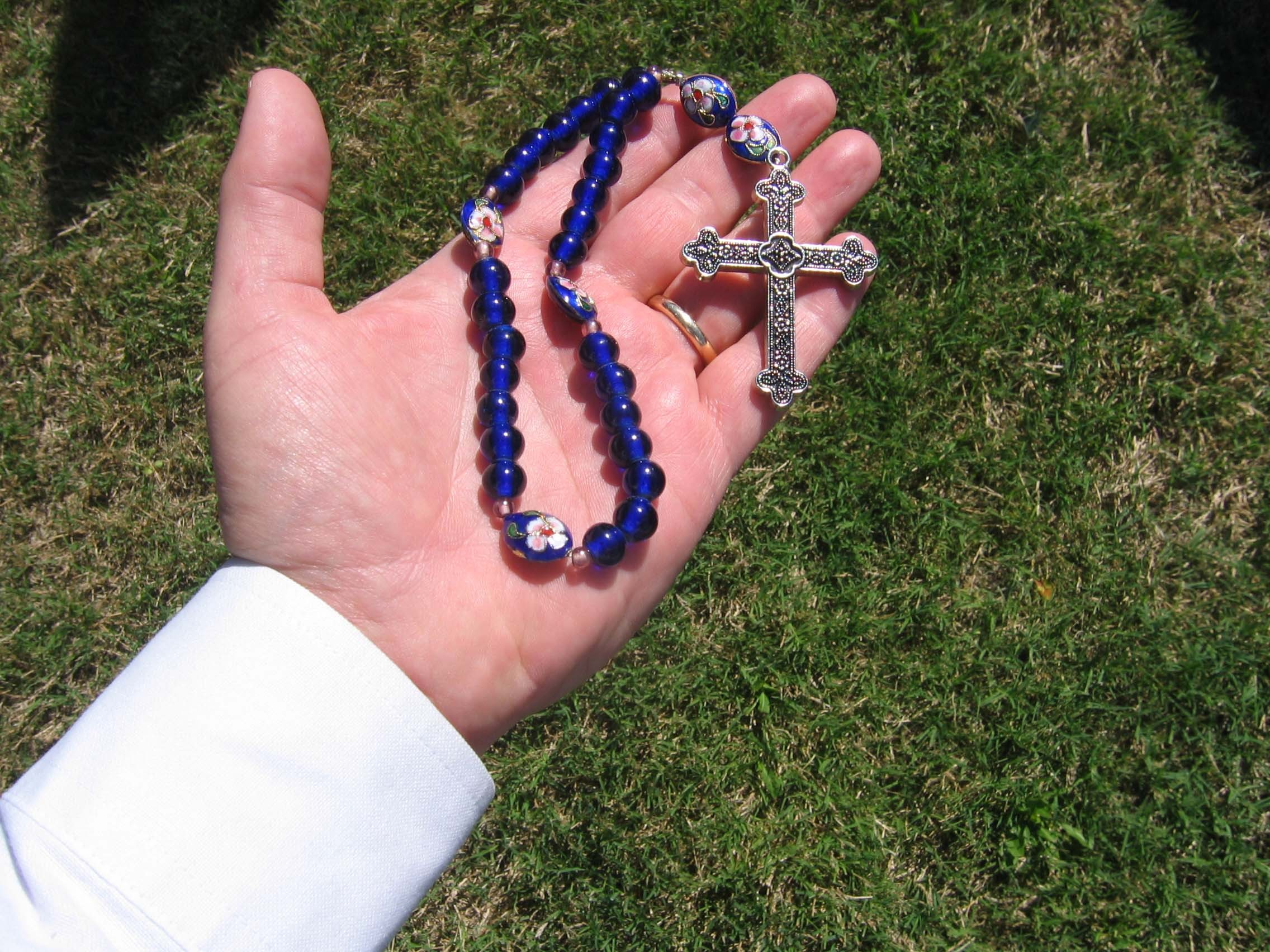
Anglican prayer beads

The use of Anglican prayer beads (also called "the Anglican Rosary") by some Anglicans and members of other Christian denominations began in the 1980s. This bead set is used in a variety of ways. Commonly, the beads are used in tandem with a fixed prayer format, but they are also used merely to keep count of whatever prayers the user has chosen for the occasion, or as a grounding tool to maintain focus on prayer. For some, the set is carried as a tangible reminder of the owner's faith, with no prayers being said on the beads at all, while some prefer to pray to the Holy Spirit, or to pray the traditional Dominican Rosary of the Blessed Virgin Mary instead of or in addition to Anglican prayers.

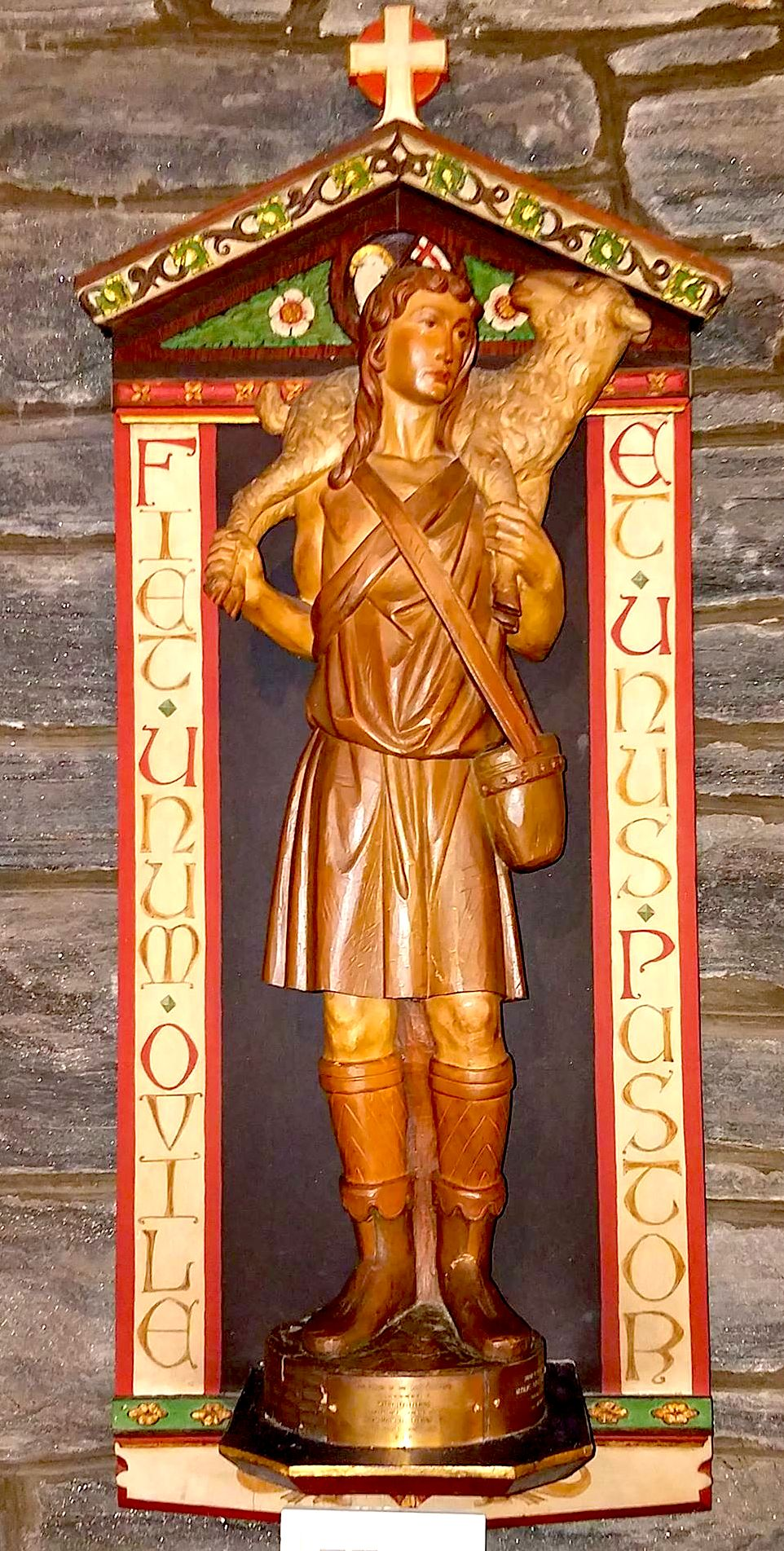
Votive Shrine at the Anglo-Catholic Church of the Good Shepherd (Rosemont, Pennsylvania)

== Sacramentals ==
Almost all Christians use sacramentals, whether they are so called or not. Sacramentals among Anglo-Catholics may include images of Christian saints, a cross or crucifix, votive candles, Mary garden and holy water. These are examples of sacramentals the purpose of which are to remind the user of God, or serve as a focus of prayer or meditation.

Depending on personal preference, the sacramentals found in an Anglican home will vary. Some will have few visible signs of their faith in the public areas of the home, whereas some will have a prominent Bible or cross in the sightline of any who come through the front door. Some may have a holy water font by their front door, into which the fingers of the right hand are dipped to make the sign of the cross upon entering and exiting the house. Some may also have devotional pictures of Jesus, or of Mary and other saints around the home, or an icon corner, a practice borrowed in recent decades from Eastern Orthodox tradition.

== See also ==
- Devotional literature
- Guild of All Souls
- Piety
- Hagiography
- Iconography
- Pilgrimage
