= Anglican Shrine of Our Lady of Walsingham =

Anglican religious building in Norfolk, England

Coordinates: 52°53′41″N 0°52′33″E

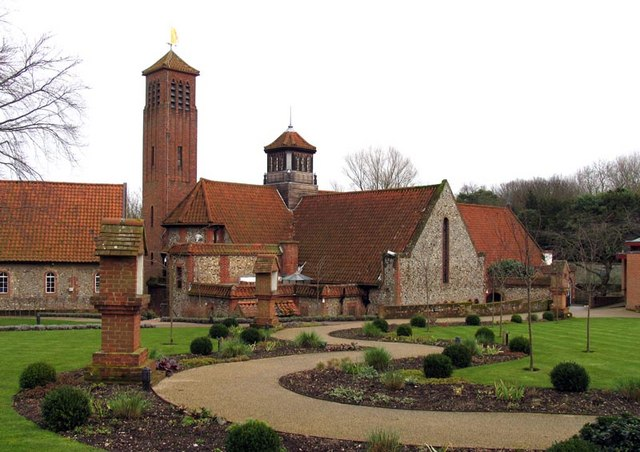
Shrine church and grounds

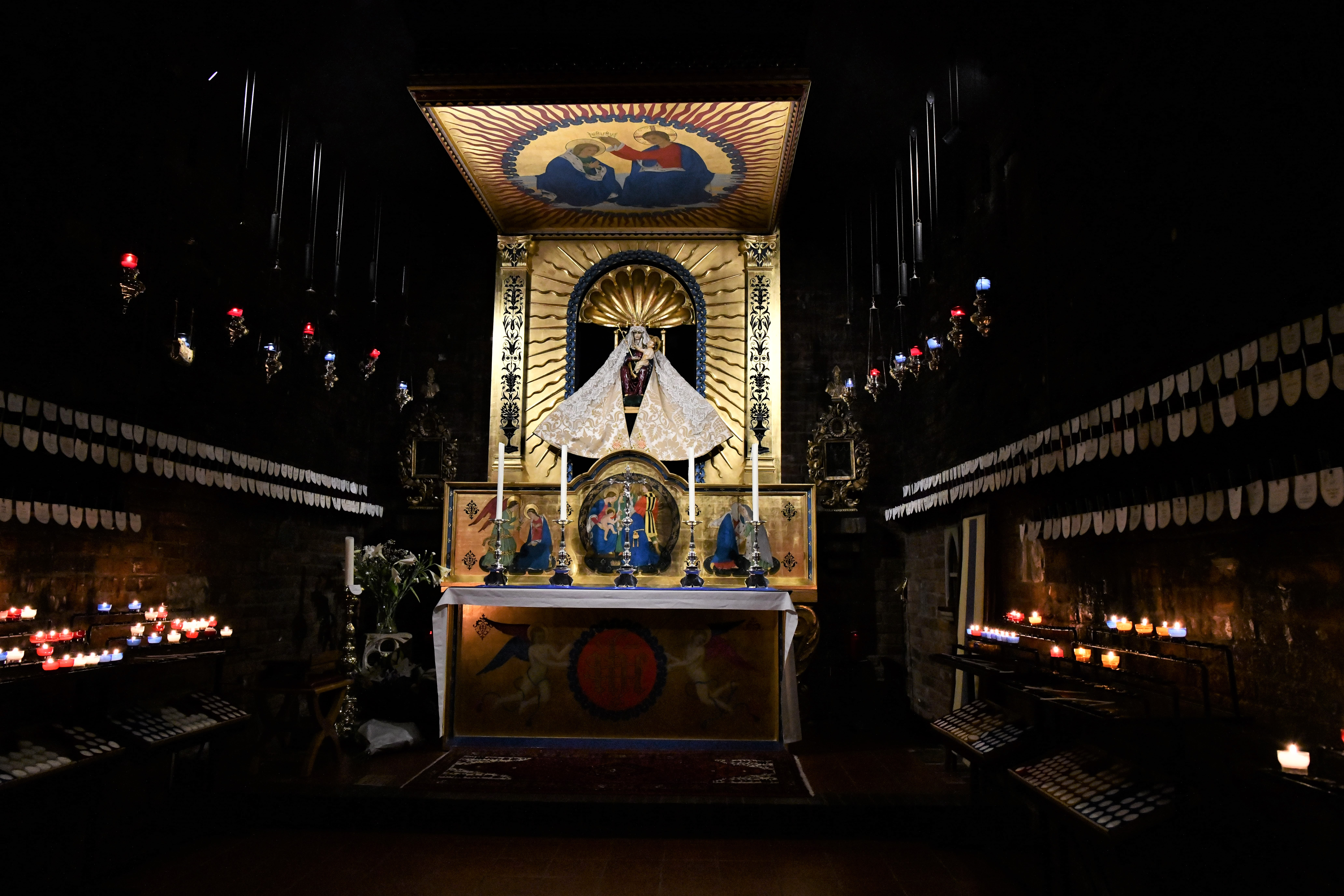
The Holy House in the Anglican Shrine of Our Lady of Walsingham with its statue carved in 1922

The Anglican Shrine of Our Lady of Walsingham is a Church of England shrine church, built in 1938 in Walsingham, Norfolk, England. It was established as part of the revival of pilgrimage devotion led by Father Alfred Hope Patten in the 1920s.

Walsingham is the site of the reputed Marian vision experienced by Lady Richeldis de Faverches, traditionally dated to 1061, though these accounts are regarded as legend rather than historically verified. Lady Richeldis' reputed Marian vision of the Virgin Mary is among the earliest recorded in England and was central to the establishment of Walsingham as a pilgrimage site. The Virgin Mary is venerated at the shrine as Our Lady of Walsingham, and the original site of the 'Holy House' at Walsingham Priory became one of the most important pilgrimage destinations in medieval England.

The original Holy House contained a revered wooden image of Our Lady, further emphasising its role as a centre of Marian devotion and pilgrimage, until it was seized and destroyed during the English Reformation. In 1538, under Henry VIII's dissolution of the monasteries, Walsingham Priory was suppressed, and the statue of Our Lady of Walsingham was reportedly taken to London and burned, bringing an end to its status as a pilgrimage site for centuries—until its revival in the late 19th and early 20th centuries.

== History ==
Lady Richeldis de Faverches was an Anglo-Saxon noblewoman and widow, traditionally credited with establishing the original shrine to the Virgin Mary in Walsingham. According to historical tradition, she experienced a series of Marian visions in which the Blessed Virgin Mary revealed the house in Nazareth where the Holy Family had lived and the Annunciation took place. In a vision vouchsafed to Lady Richeldis, she was commissioned to construct a replica of this sacred dwelling in her village of Walsingham, England, which was dedicated to the sacred mystery of the Annunciation.

Before leaving to join the Second Crusade, her son and heir, Lord Geoffrey de Faverches, left the Holy House and its grounds to his chaplain, Edwy, to establish a religious house at Walsingham, which later became Walsingham Priory, to care for the shrine of Our Lady of Walsingham. The priory passed into the care of Augustinian Canons regular during the mid-12th century.

As travelling abroad became more difficult during the time of the Crusades, Walsingham became a place of pilgrimage, ranking alongside Jerusalem, Rome, and Santiago de Compostela.

Erasmus visited the Shrine of Our Lady of Walsingham around 1512, by which time it was reputed to have been built by angels in the late eleventh century as a replica of the Virgin Mary's house in Nazareth. In the 1526 edition of his Colloquies, Erasmus examined the practices and motivations of pilgrims, particularly in the dialogue Peregrinatio, where he sought to rationalise religious devotion by contrasting external rituals with inner faith, mentioning Walsingham among the sites discussed.

Although the shrine of Our Lady of Walsingham was destroyed by Henry VIII in 1538, and the statue was reportedly burned—though sources differ on the exact location, with some accounts pointing to Thomas Cromwell's courtyard in Chelsea, London and others to Smithfield, which was a known site for public burnings—some historians have suggested that the statue may have survived. The Langham Madonna, housed in the Victoria and Albert Museum, has been proposed as the original Walsingham statue, possibly rescued or sold rather than destroyed.

Father Alfred Hope Patten SSC, appointed as the Church of England vicar of Walsingham in 1921, ignited Anglican interest in the pre-Reformation pilgrimage. It was his idea to create a new statue of Our Lady of Walsingham based on the image depicted on the medieval seal of Walsingham Priory. In 1922 the statue was set up in the Parish Church of St Mary and regular pilgrimage devotion followed. From the first night that the statue was placed there, people gathered around it to pray, asking Mary to join her prayers with theirs.

Throughout the 1920s the trickle of pilgrims became a flood of large numbers for whom, eventually, the Pilgrim Hospice was opened (a hospice can be a place of hospitality for pilgrims) and, in 1931, a new Holy House encased in a small pilgrimage church was dedicated and the statue translated there with great solemnity. In 1938 that church was enlarged to form the Anglican Shrine of Our Lady of Walsingham. The enlarged church was blessed on Whit Monday, and thereafter a pilgrimage has taken place each year, moving from the Whit Monday bank holiday to the Spring bank holiday in 1971.

During World War II, Walsingham was a restricted zone closed to visitors, but in May 1945, American forces organised the first Mass in the priory grounds since the Reformation.

Father Patten combined the posts of Vicar of Walsingham and priest administrator of the Anglican shrine until he died in 1958, whereupon the Revd John Colin Stephenson became administrator of the shrine, but declined to take on the role of vicar. Enid Chadwick contributed to the artwork in the shrine.

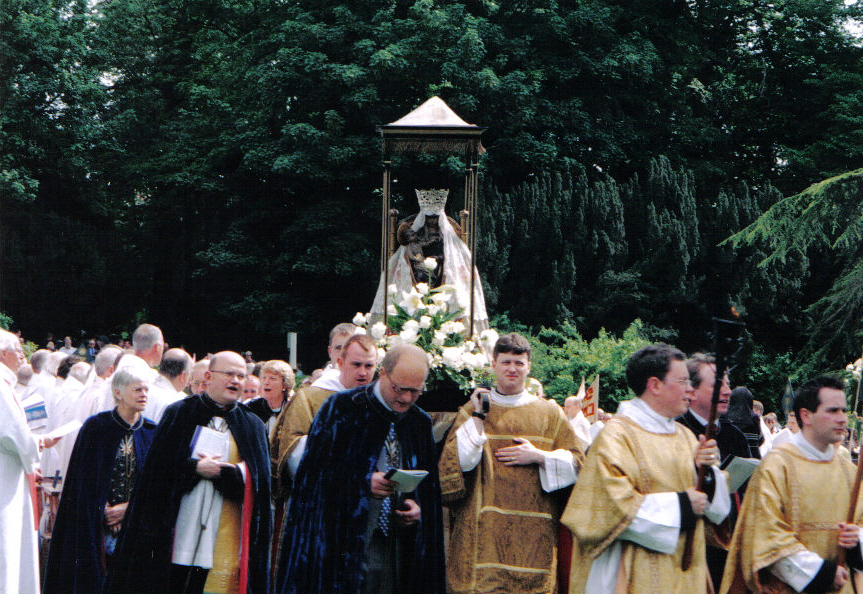
Anglicans processing with an image of the Virgin Mary during the national pilgrimage to Walsingham within the grounds of the ruined abbey, May 2003

Since 1959 the Whit Monday pilgrimage has been known as the National Pilgrimage.

The shrine church was substantially extended in the 1960s.

== Present day ==
The church has a holy well known for its healing properties; the act of receiving water from the holy well is often accompanied by the laying on of hands and anointing. Water from the well is often taken home by the faithful and distributed to their family, friends and parishioners.

The grounds include the shrine church, gardens, several chapels, a refectory, a café, a shrine shop, a visitors' centre, the Pilgrim Hall, an orangery, the College (home to priests-associate when in residence), and a large number of different residential blocks for the accommodation of resident pilgrims.

In 1947 three sisters of the Society of Saint Margaret moved to Walsingham to assist at the shrine. The Priory of Our Lady, Walsingham, was founded in 1955 as a daughter priory and gained independence as an autonomous house of the order in 1994. The sisters welcome guests and work in the shrine; they are also involved in educational work.

== Associated groups ==
Beyond the staff (who include a resident community and external day staff) several groups are officially associated with the life of the shrine. These include:

- The Association of Priests Associate of the Holy House: Founded in 1931, this is an association of priests who undertake to offer Mass for the shrine and who enjoy certain privileges at the shrine; the superior general of the association is, ex officio, the priest administrator of the shrine; since December 2011 full membership has also been available to permanent deacons, as Deacons Associate of the Holy House; it has around 2,000 members. The Guardians maintain the discipline of reserving sacramental ministry in the Shrine to male priests who have been ordained to the diaconate and to the priesthood by a male bishop at whose episcopal ordination a male bishop, himself ordained in the historic apostolic succession of bishops, presided. All priest associates must hold an active license to officiate from a Diocesan Bishop in a church which is a member of or in full communion with the Anglican Communion. A membership badge is worn, distinguished by a dark blue enamel background for priests and light blue for deacons.
- The Society of Our Lady of Walsingham: Members meet in local cells around the world and pray for the life of the shrine; it was founded in 1925; the superior general of the society is, ex officio, the priest administrator of the shrine; members commit to the daily recitation of the Angelus as an act of remembrance of the shrine.
- The Order of Our Lady of Walsingham: Founded in 1953, its members (originally known as "dames" if women, "clerks" if priests, or "lay clerks" if laymen) are admitted as a reward for service to the shrine; they have special privileges at Walsingham and meet in annual chapter; since 2000 both women and men, lay or ordained, are simply styled "member" of the order; the previously complex regalia has also been replaced with a simple cross and collarette for all members. Membership is limited, at around 60 people.
- The College of Guardians of the Holy House: The guardians hold capitular responsibility for the governing of the shrine; there are 20 guardians, ordained and lay, one of whom is elected as master; they have distinctive regalia, including a collarette with star and a blue velvet mantle; they are trustees of the shrine and its registered charity; in addition to the 20 there is also a small number of honorary guardians.

== List of priest administrators ==
- Fr Alfred Hope Patten SSC (1938 to 1958); founder and first priest administrator
- Fr John Colin Stephenson (1958 to 1968)
- Fr Charles David Smith (1968 to 1972)
- Fr Alan Vincent Careful (1973 to 1981)
- Canon Christopher Colven (1981 to 1986)
- Fr Roy Fellows (1987 to 1993)
- Fr Martin Warner SSC (1993 to 2002)
- Fr Philip North CMP (2002 to 2008)
- The Rt Revd Lindsay Urwin OGS (2009 to 2015); previously Bishop of Horsham
- Fr Kevin Smith SSC (2016 to 2024)
- Fr Ben Eadon CMP (2024 to present)

== Heraldry ==
Argent upon a cross sable, five lilies of the first slipped and seeded proper; a canton azure, charged with a Holy House or. Upon a helm mantling of the colours, and crest, issuing from a celestial crown of 12 points and stars, or, three lilies argent seeded or. Motto: Domus Dei: porta caeli.

Since 1945, the College of Guardians has been authorised to use the arms granted by the College of Arms. These arms pay homage to those of the former priory with the distinguishing mark of the Holy House as the abbey grounds are not associated with either shrine.

== See also ==
- The National Pilgrimage
- Basilica of Our Lady of Walsingham
