= Enid Chadwick =

British artist

- Born: 26 October 1902
- Died: 24 October 1987 (aged 84)
- Occupation: Artist
- Notable work: My Book of the Church's Year

Enid Mary Chadwick (26 October 1902 – 24 October 1987) was a British artist known for religious art and children's religious material.

Enid Chadwick lived in Walsingham for more than fifty years. She came to Walsingham from Brighton in 1934. She was the daughter of a priest and attended a convent school in Oxford run by the sisters of the Society of the Holy and Undivided Trinity, whose house is now St Antony's College.

Chadwick trained at the Brighton School of Art prior to coming to Walsingham in 1934. Chadwick's painting and her personal style appear in the Anglican Shrine of Our Lady of Walsingham.

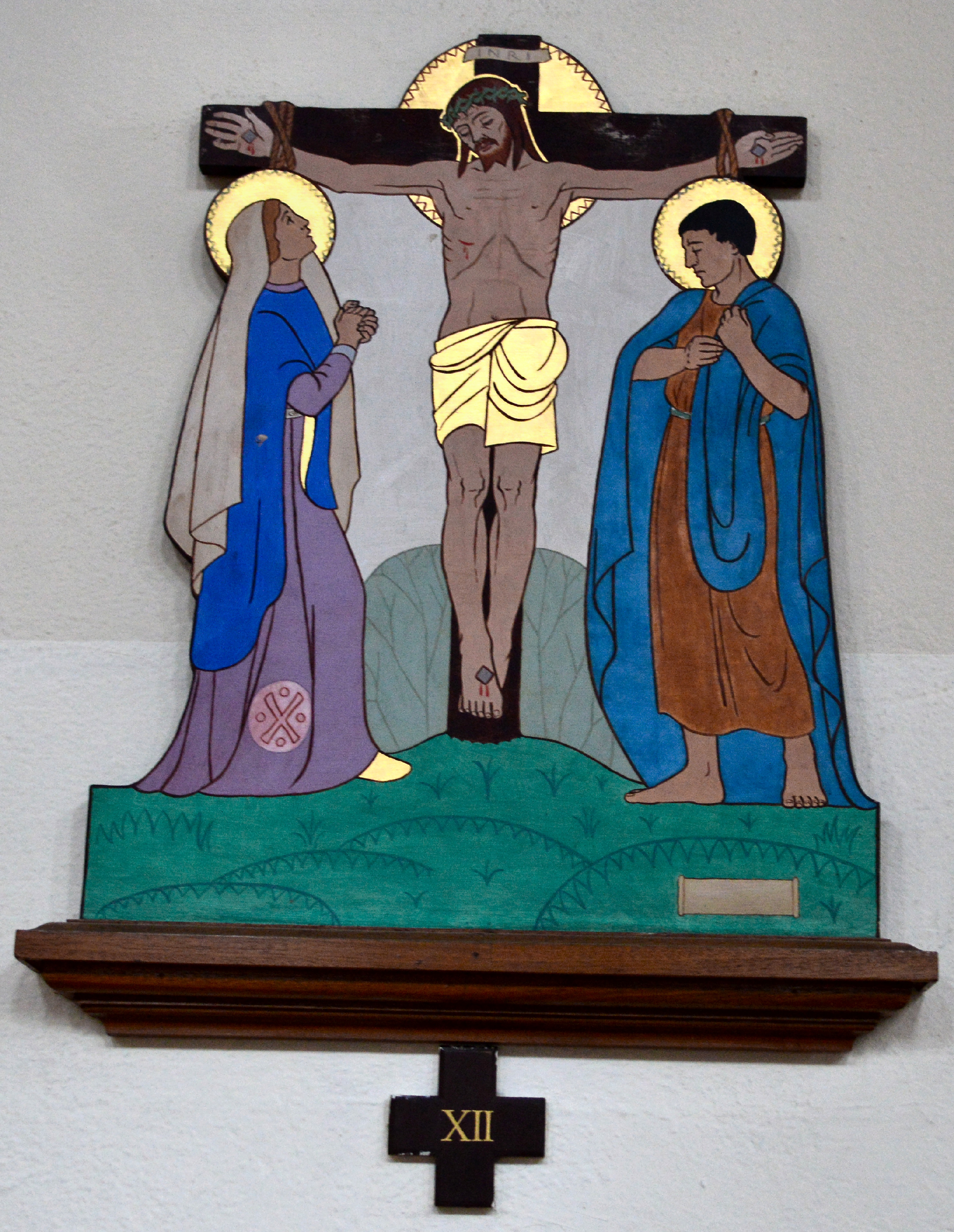
St Paul's Church, Grove Park

== Works ==
- Forty Days (no date)
- The Seven Sacraments (no date)
- Things We See in Church (no date)
- My Book of the Church's Year. Mowbray. 1957. at Project Canterbury, digitized by Richard Mammana
- God's Family: A Prayer Book Guide (1958/1963)
- At God's Altar: Rite One. Thursday Publishers. 1978. ISBN 978-0-934502-01-6.
- Teach Me Thy Way: Short Meditations for Lent. Church Literature Association. 1971.
- Saints who loved Animals. Written and illustrated by E. M. Chadwick. A. R. Mowbray & Company. 1962.
- Christian Signs and Symbols. Church Literature Association. 1968.
- Hope Patten, Alfred; Chadwick, Enid M. (1945). England's national shrine of Our Lady, past and present (2nd ed.).

== Notes and references ==
=== Bibliography ===
- Mortlock, D. P.; Roberts, C. V. (2007). The Guide to Norfolk Churches. Lutterworth Press. ISBN 978-0-7188-3064-9.
- Obbard, Elizabeth (2007). Every Pilgrim's Guide to Walsingham. Hymns Ancient and Modern Ltd. ISBN 978-1-85311-808-1.
- Yelton, Michael (2005). Anglican Papalism: A History: 1900–1960. Canterbury Press. ISBN 978-1-85311-655-1.
- Yelton, Michael (2009). Outposts of the Faith: Anglo-Catholicism in Some Rural Parishes. Hymns Ancient and Modern Ltd. ISBN 978-1-85311-985-9.
