= Walsingham Priory =

Former priory and pilgrimage site

- Augustinian Priory of The Annunciation of the Blessed Virgin Mary
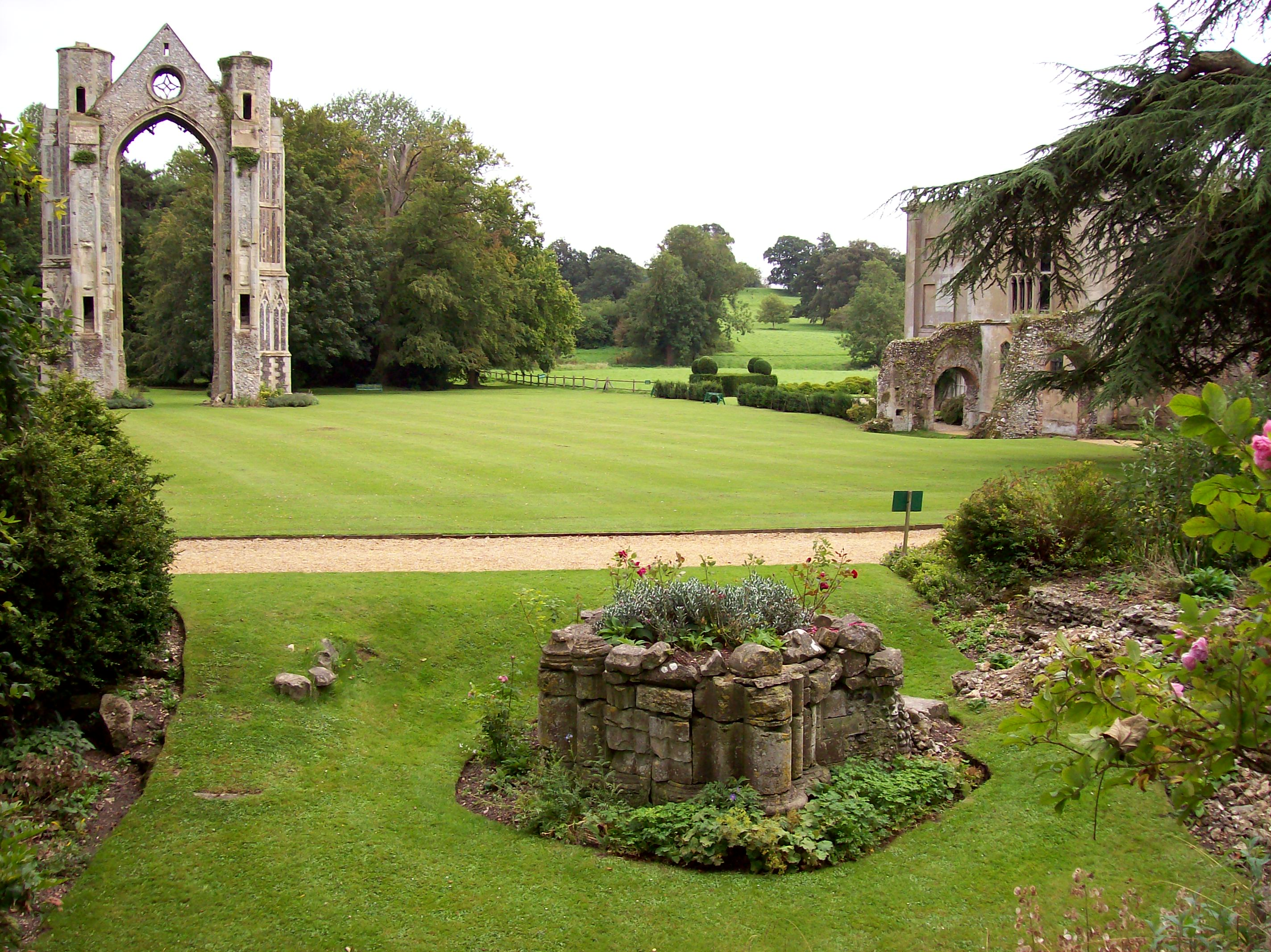
- The surviving remains of the 14th-century East Window of the priory church at Walsingham, a significant remnant of the medieval religious complex

- Location within Norfolk
- 52°53′37″N 0°52′33″E
- Location: Walsingham
- Country: England
- Denomination: Catholic Church
- Sui iuris church: Latin Church
- Website: walsinghamabbey.com

History
- Status: Public (Priory grounds) and Private (The Abbey, manor residence)
- Founded: c. 1153
- Founder(s): Funded by Geoffrey de Faverches, son of Lady Richeldis de Faverches—the original founder of the Holy House

Architecture
- Heritage designation: Grade I listed (Entry No. 1039369)
- Designated: 30 November 1951
- Style: Norman architecture
- Demolished: July 1538

Administration
- Diocese: Diocese of Norwich

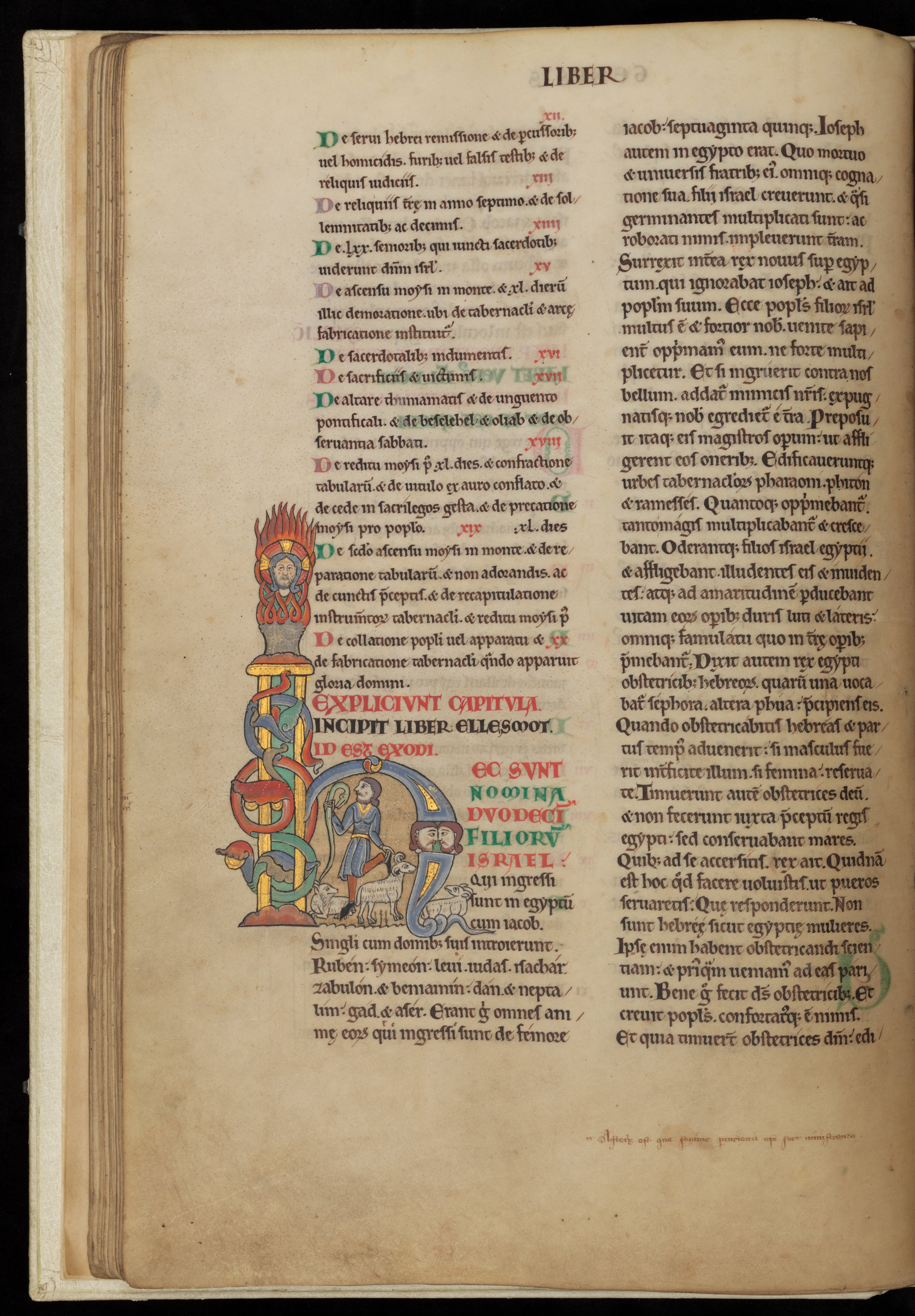
Page from the 'Walsingham Bible', one of only two books that have survived from the monastic library of Walsingham Priory. Decorative initial 'H' from the Book of Exodus, in the Chester Beatty Library in Dublin Castle

Walsingham Priory, originally established in the 12th century, was a monastery of Augustinian Canons regular in Walsingham, Norfolk, England. Also known as the Augustinian Priory of The Annunciation of the Blessed Virgin Mary, it became a significant pilgrimage site, associated with the Marian shrine of Our Lady of Walsingham, before being seized by the Crown and largely destroyed during the Dissolution of the Monasteries under King Henry VIII in the 16th century.

The Priory Grounds are best known for their historical association with the 11th-century Anglo-Saxon chapel and the Holy House, the Marian shrine of Our Lady of Walsingham. The Holy House itself was the most notable feature, housing the revered image of the Virgin Mary. Traditionally believed to be a replica of the house where Mary lived in Nazareth, it became the central focus of pilgrimage for centuries. The original location of these now-lost structures, once part of the medieval priory, is now marked by a plaque and a marker stone within the grounds of Walsingham Abbey, placed following archaeological excavations in 1961. Today, visitors can explore the grounds of Walsingham Abbey and the Shirehall Museum, which remain open to the public.

== History ==
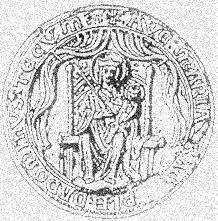
Medieval seal of Walsingham Priory, inscribed with the Annunciation text in medieval Latin: Ave Maria Gratia Plena Dominus Tecum (Hail Mary, full of grace, the Lord is with you)

Walsingham is a village located a few miles from the sea in the northern part of East Anglia. Walsingham Priory traces its origins to the time of Edward the Confessor, when Lady Richeldis de Faverches, an Anglo-Saxon noblewoman and widow, is traditionally believed to have founded the Holy House on her manor grounds in Walsingham in commemoration of the Annunciation. According to tradition, Lady Richeldis experienced a series of Marian visions in which the Virgin Mary revealed the house in Nazareth—believed to be the site of the Annunciation and the home of the Holy Family—and commissioned her to construct a replica. Lady Richeldis' vision of the Virgin Mary is among the earliest recorded Marian visions in England. The resulting structure became a centre for prayer and pilgrimage, drawing worshippers from across medieval Christendom.

The Anglo-Saxon chapel and Holy House of Our Lady of Walsingham were built in the 11th century. In the 12th century, the site was granted to the Augustinian canons and incorporated into the newly established priory, strengthening Walsingham's position as a prominent pilgrimage site.

From its foundation, the shrine of the Virgin Mary at Walsingham was recognised as an important Catholic pilgrimage site, attracting worshippers from across the British Isles and continental Europe. Both royalty and commoners visited the shrine, underscoring its widespread religious significance during the medieval period. This tradition persisted for centuries until the dissolution of the Catholic priory in 1538 during the English Reformation, when Henry VIII ordered the suppression of monasteries and Catholic pilgrimage sites across England, marking the end of Walsingham's medieval prominence. To this day, the main pilgrimage route through Newmarket, Brandon, and Fakenham remains known as the Palmers' Way. Also referred to as the Way of the Shepherds or Way of the Palm, this path was followed by pilgrims for centuries. The canons of Walsingham received many gifts of land, rents, and churches, and the shrine was associated with numerous reputed miracles.

Henry III undertook a pilgrimage to Walsingham in 1241, followed by Edward I in 1280 and 1296, Edward II in 1315, Henry VI in 1455, Henry VII in 1487, and Henry VIII in 1513.

In 1511, Erasmus made a pilgrimage from Cambridge in fulfillment of a vow, leaving as his offering a set of Greek verses expressing his piety. Thirteen years later, he wrote his colloquy on pilgrimages, in which he described the wealth and magnificence of Walsingham while rationalising some of the reputed miracles.

In 1537, while the last prior, Richard Vowell was paying obsequious respect to Thomas Cromwell, the sub-prior Nicholas Milcham was charged with conspiring against the suppression of the lesser monasteries. On flimsy evidence, he was convicted of high treason and hanged outside the priory walls.

In July 1538, Prior Vowell assented to the destruction of Walsingham Priory, assisting the king's commissioners in removing the figure of Mary, along with many gold and silver ornaments, as part of the shrine's general spoliation. In reward for his compliance, he received a large pension of 100 pounds a year, while 15 of the canons were granted smaller pensions ranging from 4 to 6 pounds.

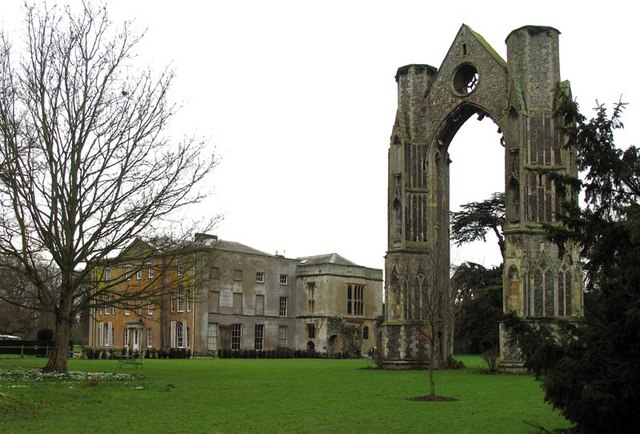
Located within the grounds of Walsingham Priory, the private mansion 'Walsingham Abbey' stands in the background, occupying the former site of the Prior's lodging. In the foreground, the surviving 14th-century East Window of the priory church represents one of the most prominent architectural remnants of the medieval religious complex

With the shrine dismantled and Walsingham Priory destroyed, the site was sold by order of Henry VIII to Thomas Sidney for 90 pounds. Over time, the Prior's lodging was expanded between the late 17th and early 19th centuries, eventually becoming a private mansion known as 'The Abbey'. The destruction of Walsingham Priory was lamented in several ballads, most notably Walsingham (also known as As I Went to Walsingham), a widely popular Elizabethan ballad tune. Other notable works reflecting on the site's religious and cultural significance include A Lover's Complaint, often attributed to Sir Walter Raleigh, and The Wreck of Walsingham, sometimes linked to Philip Howard, Earl of Arundel. The Pynson Ballad, a mid-15th-century account detailing the foundation of the shrine, offers an earlier perspective on its revered status. Following the English Reformation, these ballads served as expressions of grief over the shrine's suppression, reflecting the broader religious and cultural upheaval of the period.

== Burials ==
- Bartholomew Burghersh the younger
- Thomas Felton (died 1381)
