= Hope Patten =

The Reverend Alfred Hope Patten
- Administrator of the Shrine of Our Lady of Walsingham
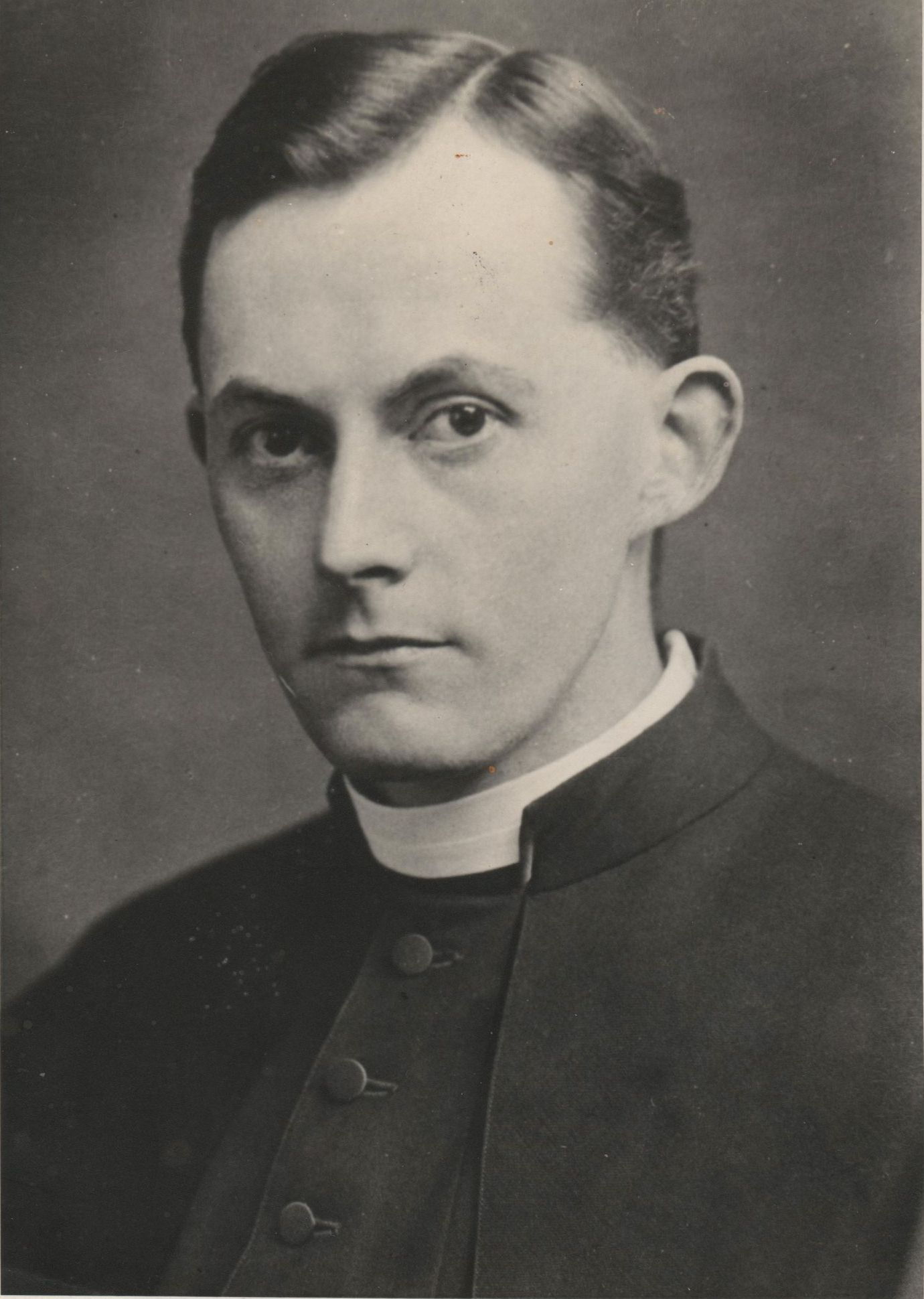
- Church: Church of England
- Diocese: Norwich
- In office: 1938–1958
- Successor: John Colin Stephenson
- Other posts: Vicar of Great and Little Walsingham

Personal details
- Born: November 17, 1885 Sidmouth, Devon, England
- Died: August 11, 1958 (aged 72) Walsingham, Norfolk, England
- Denomination: Anglican

Alfred Hope Patten (17 November 1885 in the Town Brewery, Sidmouth – 11 August 1958 in the College, Little Walsingham), known as "Pat" to his friends, was an Anglo-Catholic priest in the Church of England, best known for his founding of the Anglican Shrine of Our Lady of Walsingham.

== Life ==
Born at the Town Brewery in Sidmouth, Devon, on 17 November 1885, Pattern was the son of Alfred Patten, described as an indigent gentleman, and his wife Mary Sadler.

An introspective only child, he became an Anglo-Catholic in Brighton whilst still a teenager. He became interested in not only the medieval church but also the religious life, visiting the Anglican Benedictines at Painsthorpe in 1906 and being profoundly influenced by their abbot, Aelred Carlyle.

After attending Lichfield Theological College he was ordained deacon in 1913 at Holy Cross, Cromer Street, in the St Pancras area of London. After three other curacies, including the Good Shepherd church, Carshalton, in 1921 he became vicar of Great and Little Walsingham with St Giles', Houghton. Within months of arriving, he had a statue of Our Lady of Walsingham modelled on the medieval priory's seal and placed it in the parish's main church, St Mary's. He also started Marian devotions in his church and—aided by the League of Our Lady (later the Society of Mary)—the first pilgrimages from London. His bishop in Norwich, Bertram Pollock, opposed the statue and Patten agreed to move it out of the church, using this as a chance to build the Holy House in 1931. The Holy House was built in 1938 to accommodate rising pilgrim numbers and became the Anglican Shrine of Our Lady of Walsingham. Fr Patten's Holy House, although often described at the time and since in Anglican literature as a 'rebuild' was a replica of the Holy House of Loreto and on a completely different site to the original Holy House. In 1930, Patten led a pilgrimage to the Shrine of Our Lady of Egmanton. In the face of action by his Bishop, Fr Patten wrote that since the Holy House was on the site of the dissolved house (his sincere belief but since proven to be false) that made it the equivalent of a royal peculiar and therefore outside the bishop's jurisdiction. This was enough to deter the Bishop of Norwich. On his death he was buried in the churchyard of St Mary's in Walsingham.

== Works ==
- Pilgrims' Manual (1928)
- England's National Shrine of Our Lady Past and Present with Enid Chadwick (1939), second edition 1944
- Mary's Shrine of the Holy House, Walsingham (1954)
- Our Lady's Mirror, a quarterly paper set up in 1926 by Hope for the members of the Society of Our Lady of Walsingham
