= Richeldis de Faverches =

English noblewoman

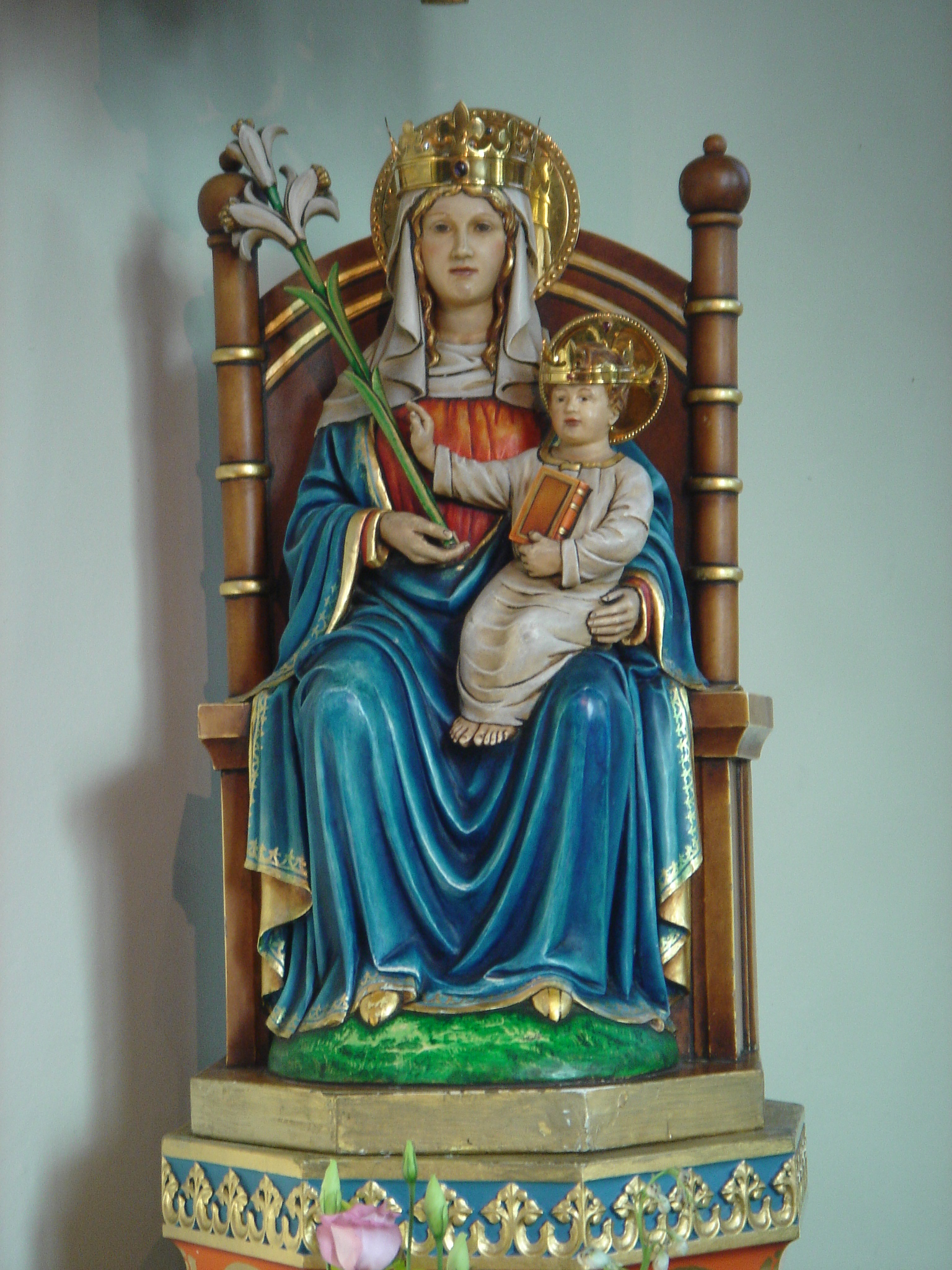
Revival depiction of the venerated Catholic image of Our Lady of Walsingham in the Basilica of Our Lady of Walsingham, late 19th century (1897), following the English Reformation

Richeldis de Faverches, also known as Recholdis or Rychold, was a devout English Christian noblewoman and widow, traditionally recognised as the Lady of the Manor of Little Walsingham and credited with establishing the original shrine of Our Lady of Walsingham. According to the 15th-century text The Foundation of the Chapel of Walsingham (commonly known as the Pynson Ballad), she experienced a Marian vision in 1061, in which the Blessed Virgin Mary vouchsafed to her a view of the Holy House in Nazareth and commissioned her to construct a counterpart in Walsingham, dedicated to the sacred mystery of the Annunciation. This vision, recorded in the ballad published by Richard Pynson around 1485, is considered one of the earliest documented Marian visions in England.

== Traditional account ==
According to tradition preserved in the ballad, Richeldis experienced a series of three visions in which the Virgin Mary appeared to her. In these visions, Richeldis was shown the house of the Annunciation in Nazareth and was commissioned to build a replica in Walsingham as a place of pilgrimage where people could honour the Virgin Mary. According to tradition, Mary is said to have promised, 'Whoever seeks my help there will not go away empty-handed,' in connection with the shrine at Walsingham.

According to the same tradition, the construction initially faced difficulties. One night, Richeldis heard singing and stepped into her garden, where she discovered that the little house had been miraculously completed about 200 yards (600 ft) from the original site. As she looked on, she saw what she believed to be angels departing from the newly finished building. The original Holy House was a simple wooden structure, measuring approximately 24 ft. by 13 ft., with four small turrets and a central tower. To protect it from the elements, the structure was later encased in stone.

Based on an analysis of historical documents, historian J.C. Dickinson (1959) suggests that the foundation of the Shrine of Our Lady of Walsingham occurred between 1130 and 1153, aligning with the establishment of Walsingham Priory. According to Dickinson's research, the noblewoman Lady Richeldis de Faverches, traditionally credited with founding the shrine, died in 1145, leaving her estate to her son, Lord Geoffrey de Faverches.

Before departing to join the Second Crusade, Lord Geoffrey entrusted the Holy House and its grounds to his chaplain, Edwy, with the intention of establishing a religious order to care for the chapel of Our Lady of Walsingham.

During the time of the Crusades, travel to holy sites abroad became increasingly difficult. As a result, Walsingham emerged as a major pilgrimage destination, recognized alongside Jerusalem, Rome, and Santiago de Compostela. Devotees flocked to the shrine, believing it to be a faithful replica of the Holy House of Nazareth, traditionally built with divine intervention.

The historian Henrietta Leyser also disputes the traditionally accepted date of 1061, asserting that Richeldis flourished around 1130. Furthermore, she notes that the family does not appear in the Domesday Book, which was compiled in 1086 and records landowners and holdings at that time. Since the book serves as a comprehensive survey of land ownership following the Norman Conquest, the absence of the family suggests that they did not hold land in the area during that period.
