= Our Lady of Walsingham =

Title of Mary, mother of Jesus

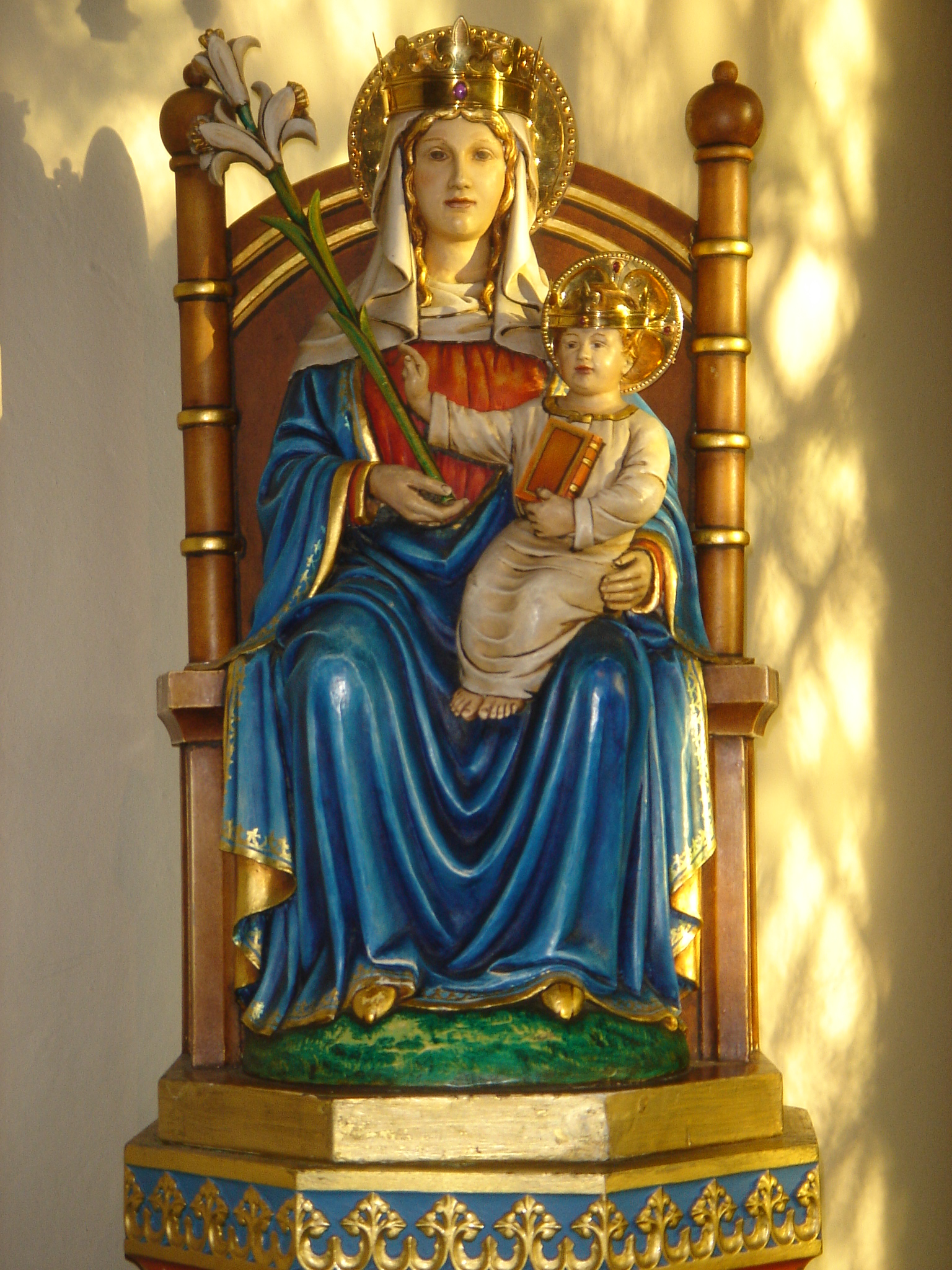
- Statue of Our Lady of Walsingham at the Catholic Basilica of Our Lady (Slipper Chapel)
- Location: Walsingham, England
- Date: 1061
- Witness: Richeldis de Faverches
- Type: Marian vision
- Approval: Pope Leo XIII; Pope Pius XII
- Venerated in: Catholic Church, Anglicanism, and Western Orthodoxy
- Shrine: Originally located at Walsingham Priory, now represented by the Catholic Basilica of Our Lady of Walsingham (Slipper Chapel) and the Anglican Shrine of Our Lady of Walsingham
- Attributes: The Blessed Virgin Mary enthroned as Queen wearing a golden Saxon crown and golden slippers carrying the Child Jesus with the Gospel book and a Lily flower.
- Feast day: 24 September; 15 October

Our Lady of Walsingham is a title given to Mary, the mother of Jesus, venerated by Catholics, high-church Anglicans and Western Rite Orthodox Christians. According to tradition, the title is linked to a Marian vision experienced in 1061 by Lady Richeldis de Faverches, an Anglo-Saxon noblewoman and widow, in the village of Walsingham, Norfolk, England. In the vision allegedly seen by Lady Richeldis, the Blessed Virgin Mary showed her the Holy House in Nazareth and commissioned her to construct a counterpart in Walsingham, dedicated to the sacred mystery of the Annunciation.

The reputed appearance of the Virgin Mary to Lady Richeldis is one of the earliest recorded Marian visions in England and was central to the establishment of Walsingham as a pilgrimage site. The shrine became a major pilgrimage site during the medieval period, attracting worshippers from across England and Europe. After Lady Richeldis' death, her son, Geoffrey de Faverches, inherited the estate and entrusted the care of the Holy House to his chaplain, Edwy. Before his death, Geoffrey left instructions for the establishment of a religious foundation, which led to the founding of Walsingham Priory between 1146 and 1174. The priory was eventually placed under the care of the Canons Regular of Saint Augustine, further solidifying Walsingham's role as a centre of Marian devotion in England.

During the Middle Ages, Walsingham grew into one of England's most significant pilgrimage destinations, attracting royalty and commoners alike. Though the original shrine was dismantled during the English Reformation, the tradition of pilgrimage to Walsingham was revived in the late 19th and early 20th centuries and it remains a significant centre for devotion among both Catholics and Anglicans.

By a papal rescript issued on 6 February 1897, Pope Leo XIII blessed a venerated image for the restored medieval sanctuary of Our Lady of Walsingham. At the time, the Catholic community of Walsingham was under the pastoral care of the Catholic parish of Our Lady of the Annunciation in King's Lynn, which was designated as the Catholic national shrine of Our Lady of Walsingham. The image was sent from Rome and placed in the Lady Chapel at the newly built Catholic parish church of King's Lynn on 19 August 1897. Designed with inspiration from the Holy House within the Basilica della Santa Casa in Loreto, the Lady Chapel reflected elements of its revered Marian tradition. Catholics undertook the first organised pilgrimage to Walsingham since the English Reformation, travelling from King's Lynn to the 14th-century Slipper Chapel in Houghton St Giles, one mile from Walsingham. The chapel had been purchased by Charlotte Boyd in 1895 and restored for Catholic devotion. Approximately 40–50 Catholics participated in this first public pilgrimage to Walsingham, initiating an annual pilgrimage traditionally held at Whitsun (the Feast of Pentecost). The shrine remained at King's Lynn until 1934, when it was transferred to the Slipper Chapel.

On 15 August 1954, Pope Pius XII granted a canonical coronation to the venerated image of Our Lady of Walsingham. The coronation was carried out by the papal nuncio, Bishop Gerald O'Hara, with a gold crown funded by gold and jewels donated by Catholic women from across the country. The image is now venerated at the Catholic National Shrine in the Basilica of Our Lady of Walsingham, which incorporates the Slipper Chapel.

The feast day of Our Lady of Walsingham is observed on 24 September in both the Anglican and Catholic churches. Anglicans, particularly those in the Society of Our Lady of Walsingham and at the Anglican Shrine of Our Lady of Walsingham, also commemorate an additional feast of translation on 15 October each year, marking the anniversary of the translation of the image from Walsingham's parish church to the shrine church in 1931. In the United States, some local churches recognise 15 October as the principal feast of Our Lady of Walsingham, including the Episcopal Church (Anglican Communion) and Western Rite Orthodox churches of the Russian Orthodox Church Outside of Russia and the Antiochian Orthodox Christian Archdiocese of North America.

== History ==
=== Marian vision ===
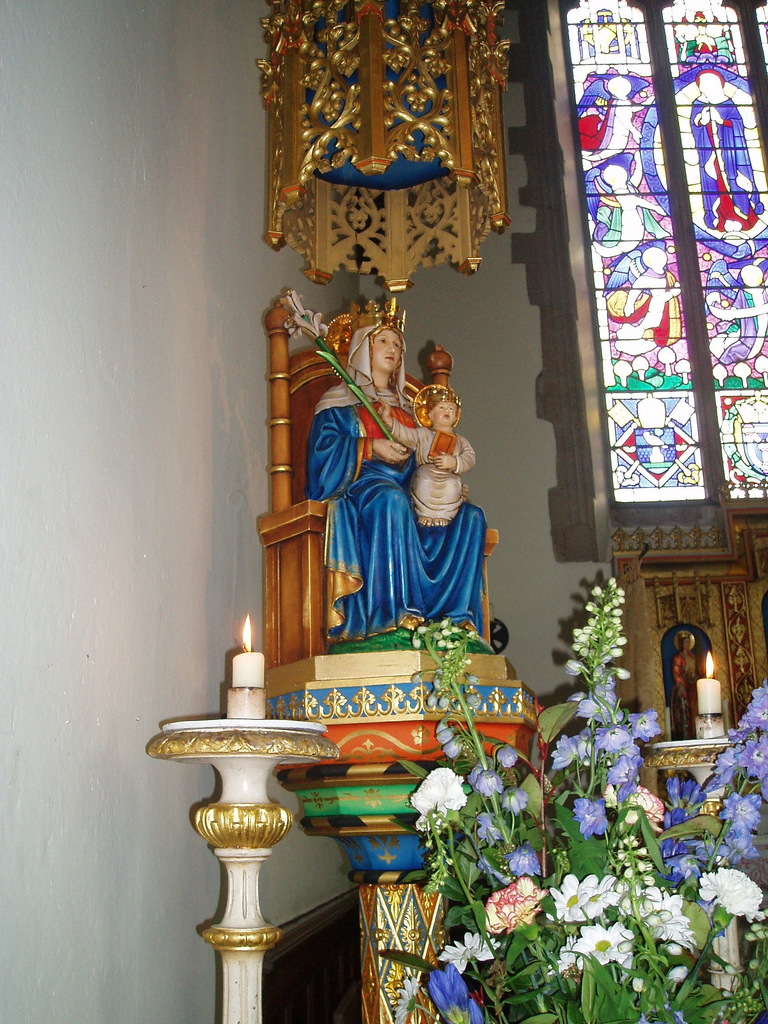
The national shrine of Our Lady of Walsingham at the Catholic Basilica of Our Lady in Houghton St Giles (Slipper Chapel), built in 1340 as the last chapel on the pilgrim route to the priory in Walsingham

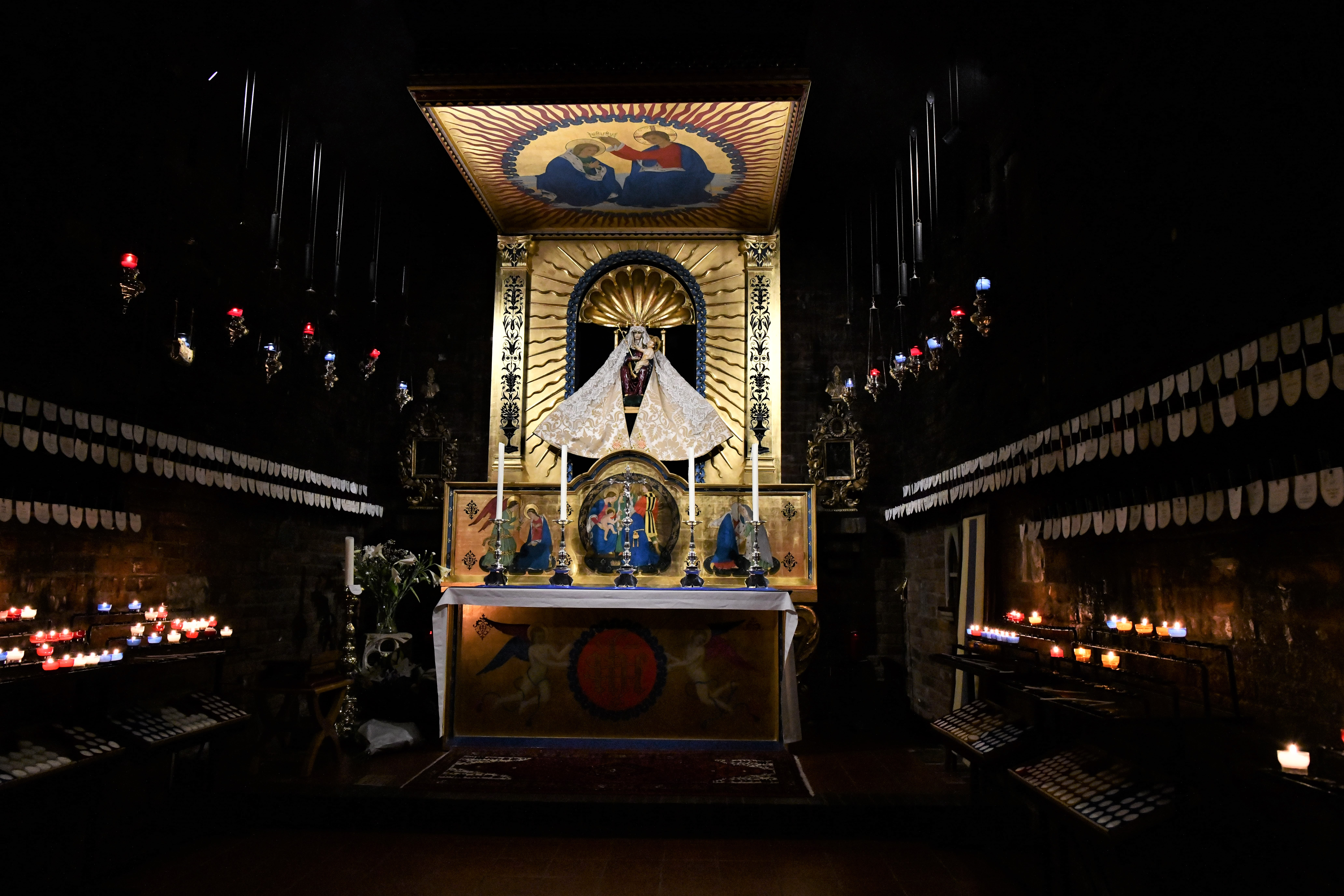
The Holy House in the Anglican Shrine of Our Lady of Walsingham with its statue carved in 1922

According to the tradition, Lady Richeldis experienced a series of Marian visions in which the Blessed Virgin Mary showed her the house in Nazareth where the Holy Family once lived and the Annunciation occurred. She was commissioned to build a replica of this house in her village, Walsingham, England. This structure, known as the "Holy House", later became a revered shrine and a significant pilgrimage site in medieval England. The original Holy House contained a wooden image of Our Lady, further emphasising its role as a centre of Marian devotion.

=== Post-Reformation revival ===
The late 19th-century wooden image of Our Lady of Walsingham, housed at the Catholic Basilica of Our Lady of Walsingham, was crafted in Oberammergau, Germany, as a replica of the image in Santa Maria in Cosmedin. Blessed by Pope Leo XIII in 1897, it was originally enshrined in Our Lady of the Annunciation Church in King's Lynn, which functioned as the national shrine of Our Lady of Walsingham until 1934. Following the shrine's re-establishment in Walsingham, the image was relocated to the 14th-century Slipper Chapel, which was later elevated to the status of a Catholic Basilica by Pope Francis in 2015, where it remains a focal point of devotion.

Similarly, the Anglican Shrine of Our Lady of Walsingham, founded as part of the revival of pilgrimage devotion led by Father Alfred Hope Patten in the 1920s, houses a wooden image of Our Lady, carved in 1922 and based on the seal of the medieval priory. The shrine includes a reconstructed Holy House, reflecting the dimensions of the original structure built by Lady Richeldis in 1061.

=== Holy House and pilgrimages ===
The historian J. C. Dickinson (1959) asserts that the former Anglo-Saxon chapel at Walsingham was established in 1053, during the reign of Edward the Confessor, confirming that it predates both the shrine and the later Augustinian priory. While this chapel served as an early Christian worship site, the shrine—known as the Holy House—has traditionally been believed to have been established in 1061, as recorded in the Pynson Ballad. However, Dickinson's research disputes this claim, arguing that the shrine was founded later, likely between 1130 and 1153, based on historical records rather than the traditional account of Lady Richeldis' legendary visions.

In 1169, Geoffrey de Favraches granted "to God and St Mary and to Edwy, his clerk, the chapel of Our Lady", originally founded by his mother. The grant carried the intention that Edwy would establish a priory at the site, which was formally transferred to the Augustinian Canons of Walsingham through confirmations by Robert de Brucurt and Roger, Earl of Clare. Over time, the shrine became the focal point of pilgrimage, and when the Augustinian priory was founded, it eventually incorporated both the Anglo-Saxon chapel and the shrine, making Walsingham a major centre of Marian devotion.

However, historian Bill Flint (2015) disputes Dickinson's timeline for the shrine's foundation, arguing that the 1161 Norfolk Roll refers specifically to the foundation of the Augustinian priory, rather than the shrine itself. Flint supports the traditional 1061 date recorded in the Pynson Ballad, asserting that Walsingham's religious significance was already established by then. He controversially claims that Queen Edith the Fair, Lady of the Manor, rather than Lady Richeldis, was the likely Walsingham visionary, suggesting that the shrine's origins are rooted in Anglo-Saxon royal heritage.

By the time of its destruction in 1538 during the reign of Henry VIII, the shrine had become one of the greatest religious centres in England and Europe, alongside Glastonbury and Canterbury. During medieval times, it was a prominent pilgrimage site, especially as wars and political upheaval made travel to Rome and Santiago de Compostela increasingly difficult and time-consuming.

Royal patronage helped the shrine to grow in wealth and popularity. It received regal visits from kings Henry III, Edward I, Edward II, Henry IV, Edward IV, Henry VII, Henry VIII and also Catherine of Aragon.

Visiting in 1513, Desiderius Erasmus wrote:

When you look in you would say it is the abode of saints, so brilliantly does it shine with gems, gold and silver [...] Our Lady stands in the dark at the right side of the altar [...] a little image, remarkable neither for its size, material or workmanship.

It was also a place of pilgrimage for Catherine of Aragon who was a regular pilgrim. Likewise, Anne Boleyn announced that she planned to make a pilgrimage but never did. Its wealth and prestige did not, however, prevent its being a disorderly house. The visitation of Bishop Richard Nykke in 1514 revealed that the prior was leading a scandalous life and that, among many other things, he treated the canons with insolence and brutality; the canons themselves frequented taverns and were quarrelsome. The prior, William Lowth, was removed and by 1526 some decent order had been restored.

=== Destruction ===
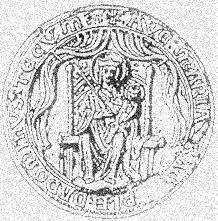
Medieval seal of Walsingham Priory, inscribed with the Annunciation text in medieval Latin: Ave Maria Gratia Plena Dominus Tecum (Hail Mary, full of grace, the Lord is with you)

The suppression of the monasteries was part of the English Reformation. On the pretext of discovering any irregularities in their life, Thomas Cromwell organised a series of visitations, the results of which led to the report Valor Ecclesiasticus and the enactment of the Suppression of Religious Houses Act 1535, under which some smaller foundations (which did not include Walsingham) were extinguished in 1536. Six years earlier the prior of Walsingham, Richard Vowell, had signed his acceptance of the king's supremacy, but it did not save his priory. Cromwell's actions were politically motivated, but the canons, who had a number of houses in Norfolk, were not noted for their piety or good order. The prior was evidently compliant, but not all of the community felt likewise. In 1537, two lay choristers organised "the most serious plot hatched anywhere south of the Trent", intended to resist what the monks feared, rightly as it turned out, would happen to their foundation. Eleven men were executed as a result. The sub-prior, Nicholas Milcham, was charged with conspiring to rebel against the suppression of the lesser monasteries, and on flimsy evidence was convicted of high treason and hanged outside the priory walls.

The suppression of the Walsingham priory came late in 1538, under the supervision of Sir Roger Townshend, a local landowner. Walsingham was famous and its fall was symbolic.

The priory buildings were looted and largely destroyed, but the memory of it was less easy to eradicate. Townsend wrote to Cromwell that a woman of nearby Wells (now called Wells-next-the-Sea) had declared that a miracle had been done by the statue after it had been carried away to London. He had the woman put in the stocks on market day to be abused by the village folk but concluded "I cannot perceyve but the seyd image is not yett out of the sum of ther heddes."

The site of the priory with the churchyard and gardens was granted by the Crown to Thomas Sydney. All that remained of it was the gatehouse, the great east window arch, and a few outbuildings. An Elizabethan ballad, "A Lament for Walsingham" expresses something of what many Norfolk people felt at the loss of their shrine of Our Lady of Walsingham.

=== Fate of the statue ===
John Hussey wrote to Lord Lisle in 1538: "July 18th: This day our late Lady of Walsingham was brought to Lambhithe (Lambeth) where was both my Lord Chancellor and my Lord Privy Seal, with many virtuous prelates, but there was offered neither oblation nor candle: what shall become of her is not determined." The image was said to have been burned with images from other shrines at some point, publicly, in London. Two chroniclers, Hall and Speed, suggested that the actual burning did not take place until September.

Although Hussey claimed to have witnessed the removal of the statue of Our Lady of Walsingham to London, there is no extant eyewitness account of its destruction. Claims that the image was destroyed do not agree on the place or date of destruction. There have been persistent suggestions that the image may in fact have been rescued and hidden by parties loyal to the tradition of veneration. On 23 December 1925, a medieval madonna and child statue, named the Langham Madonna, was purchased by the Victoria and Albert Museum. As early as 1931, the leading Anglo-Papalist priest Henry Joy Fynes-Clinton suggested that the Langham Madonna could be the original image from Walsingham. It is incomplete, but the remaining parts bear a striking resemblance to the image's depiction on the medieval Walsingham Priory seal. In 2019, the English art historians Michael Rear and Francis Young, having studied the provenance, form, and damage to the Langham Madonna, published their conclusions (originally through the Catholic Herald) that it is actually the original statue of Our Lady of Walsingham.

== Modern revival ==
After nearly four hundred years of decline following the English Reformation, the 20th century saw pilgrimage to Walsingham restored as a regular part of Christian life in the British Isles and beyond. Today, Walsingham is home to major Catholic and Anglican shrines, as well as a smaller Orthodox shrine.

=== Slipper Chapel: Catholic national shrine ===
Built in 1340, the chapel was originally known as the Chapel of Saint Catherine of Alexandria and is informally called the Slipper Chapel. Located in Houghton St Giles, one mile outside Walsingham, it served as the final 'wayside' chapel on the pilgrimage route, marking the place where pilgrims traditionally removed their shoes to walk the last 'holy mile' to Walsingham Priory barefoot—a penitential act symbolising humility and spiritual purification. This practice gave the chapel its designation as the 'Slipper' Chapel.

In 1896, Charlotte Pearson Boyd, a wealthy local resident, identified the 14th-century Slipper Chapel, which had undergone centuries of secular use. She purchased the chapel, initiated its restoration, and later donated it to Downside Abbey for Catholic devotion.

In 1897, Pope Leo XIII re-established the Holy House, rebuilt at the Our Lady of the Annunciation Church in King's Lynn, as the Catholic national shrine of Our Lady of Walsingham. At the time Walsingham was part of this Catholic parish. At the same time, a statue, carved at Oberammergau and blessed in Rome by Pope Leo XIII was placed there. Since 1934, the restored 14th-century Slipper Chapel has served as the Catholic national shrine of Our Lady of Walsingham, following the translation of the shrine from the Our Lady of the Annunciation Church in King's Lynn to Walsingham.

=== Anglican shrine ===
The Anglican Shrine of Our Lady of Walsingham was created in 1931 and later expanded in 1938 to include a replica of the Holy House. In 1921, Fr Alfred Hope Patten was appointed Vicar of Walsingham, and in 1922, he placed a statue of Our Lady of Walsingham in the Parish Church of St Mary. The statue was inspired by the depiction found on the medieval seal of Walsingham Priory.

As pilgrim numbers grew, a new chapel was dedicated in 1931, and the statue was ceremonially moved there in a grand translation procession on 15 October 1931. The chapel was extended in 1938, forming the present-day Anglican shrine church.

== Veneration ==
=== Locally ===
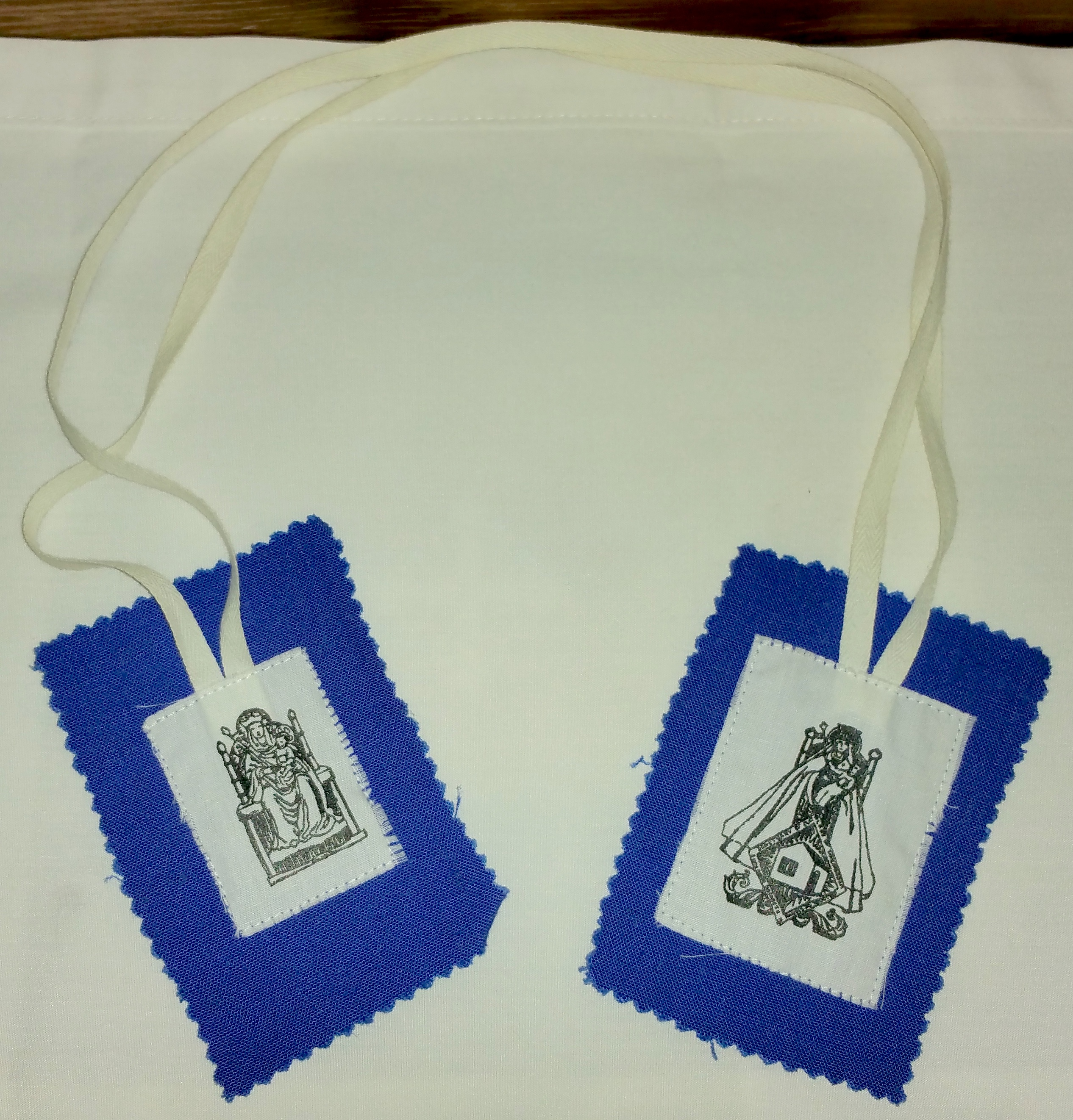
The Scapular of Our Lady of Walsingham

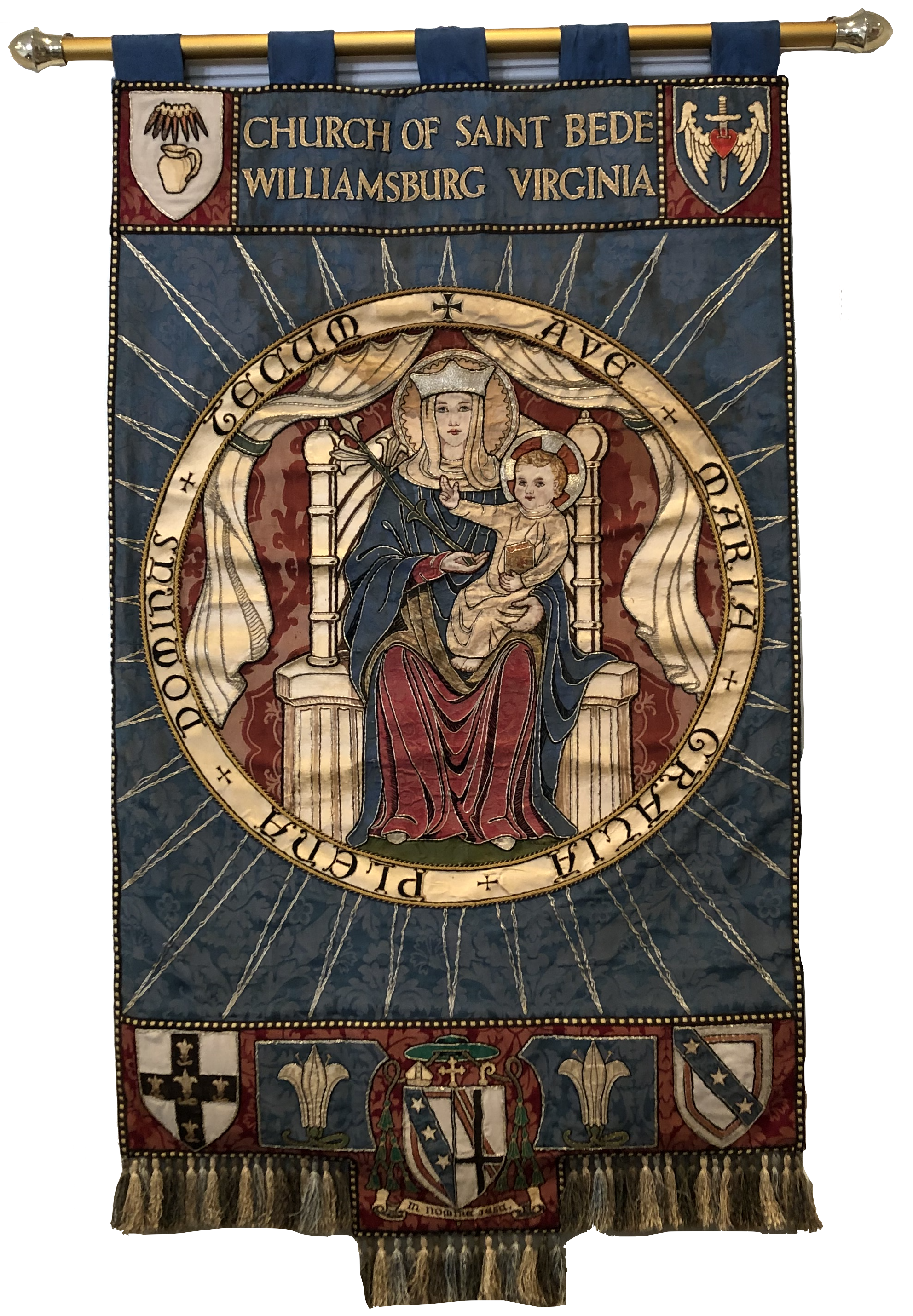
Banner depicting Our Lady of Walsingham

There is frequently an ecumenical dimension to pilgrimages to Walsingham, with many pilgrims arriving at the Slipper Chapel and then walking to the Holy House at the Anglican shrine. Pilgrim Cross is the longest continuous walking pilgrimage in Britain to Walsingham which takes place over Holy Week and Easter.

=== Overseas ===
In the United States, the National Shrine to Our Lady of Walsingham for the Episcopal Church (part of the Anglican Communion) is located in Grace Church, Sheboygan, Wisconsin, and for the Catholic Church at Saint Bede's Church, Williamsburg, Virginia. The Catholic national shrine of Our Lady of Walsingham is a separate chapel that belongs to the parish of St. Bede's Church in Williamsburg, Virginia. A Western Rite Antiochian Orthodox parish named for Our Lady of Walsingham is in Mesquite, Texas. There is a blue Anglican devotional scapular known as the Scapular of Our Lady of Walsingham.

=== Personal ordinariates ===
The personal ordinariate established for former Anglicans in England and Wales is named for Our Lady of Walsingham. The cathedral of the Personal Ordinariate of the Chair of St. Peter in Houston, Texas, is named for Our Lady of Walsingham.

=== Pontifical approbations ===
- Pope Leo XIII issued a papal decree from Rome blessing the Marian image for public veneration on 6 February 1897.
- Pope Pius XII granted a canonical coronation to the Catholic image via the papal nuncio, Bishop Gerald O'Hara, on 15 August 1954 with a gold crown funded by her female devotees, now venerated in the Basilica of Our Lady of Walsingham.
- During an open-air Mass at Wembley Stadium on 29 May 1982, Pope John Paul II marked the eve of Pentecost. The statue of Our Lady of Walsingham was given a place of honour on the altar for the occasion.
- Pope Francis raised her sanctuary to the status of a minor basilica on 27 December 2015 through an apostolic decree from the Congregation for Divine Worship and the Discipline of the Sacraments.

== Gallery ==
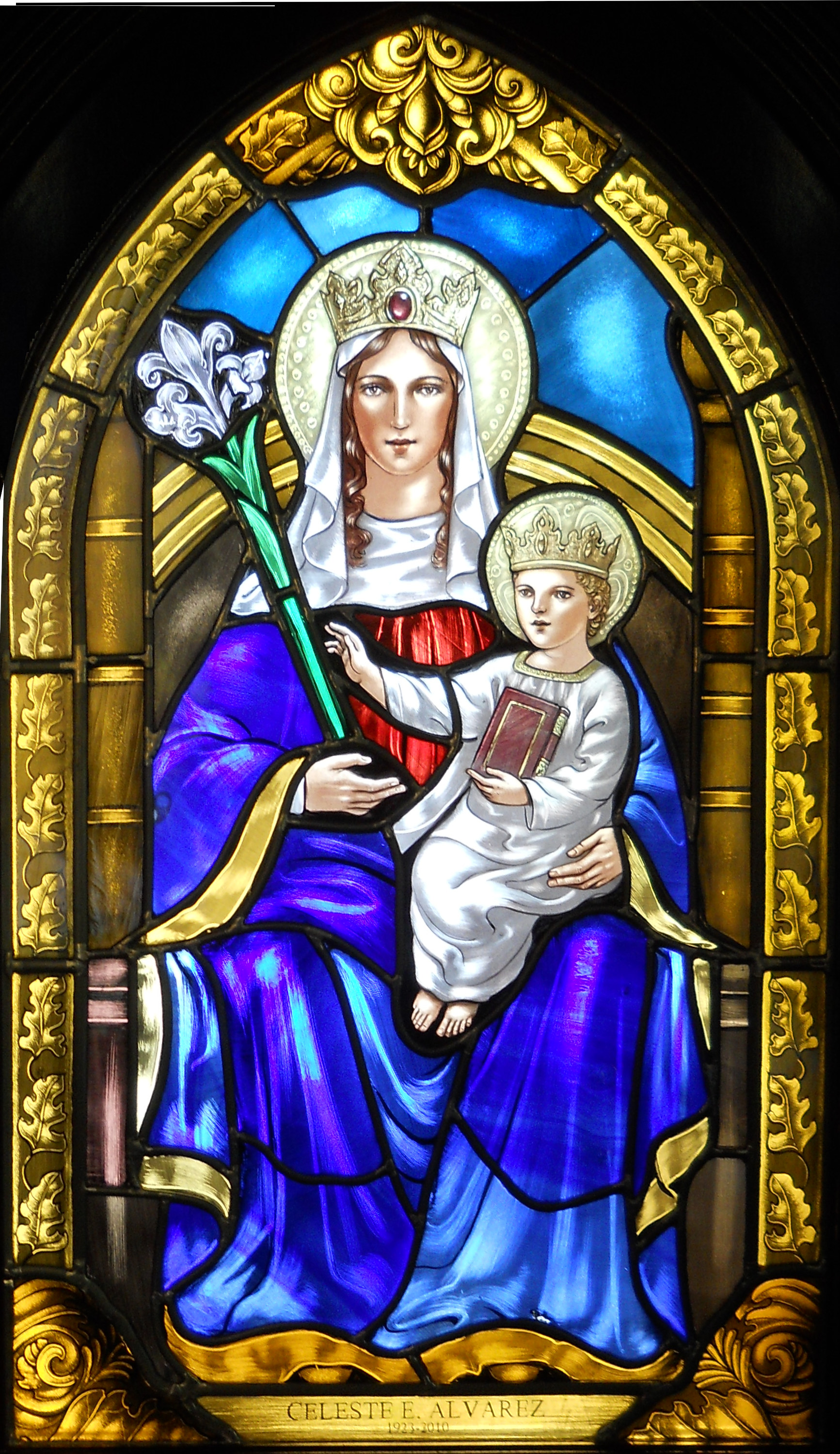
A stained glass window featuring Our Lady of Walsingham. All Saints Episcopal Church, Jensen Beach, Florida

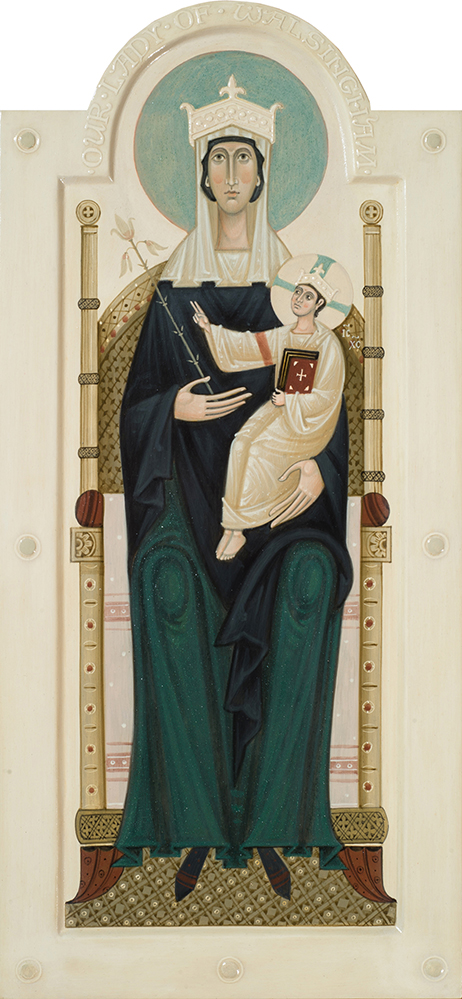
Icon of Our Lady of Walsingham by iconographer Olga Shalamova

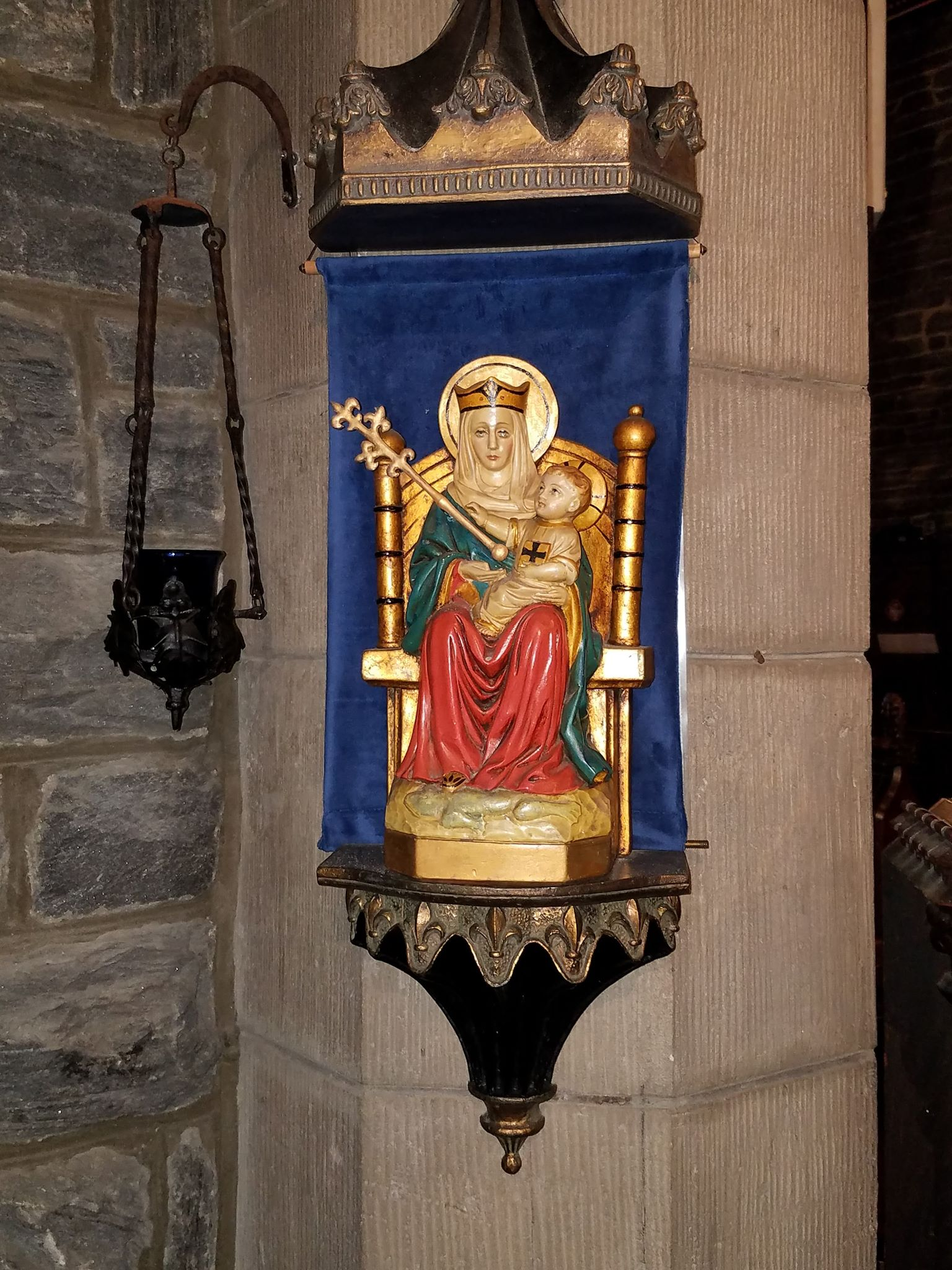
Our Lady of Walsingham shrine at the Episcopal Church of the Good Shepherd (Rosemont, Pennsylvania)

== See also ==
- Anglican Marian theology
- Dowry of Mary
- Our Lady of Cardigan
- Our Lady of Doncaster
- Our Lady of Ipswich
- Our Lady of Westminster
- Cathedral of Our Lady of Walsingham (Houston)
