= St Mary and All Saints, Little Walsingham =

Parish church of Little Walsingham, Norfolk

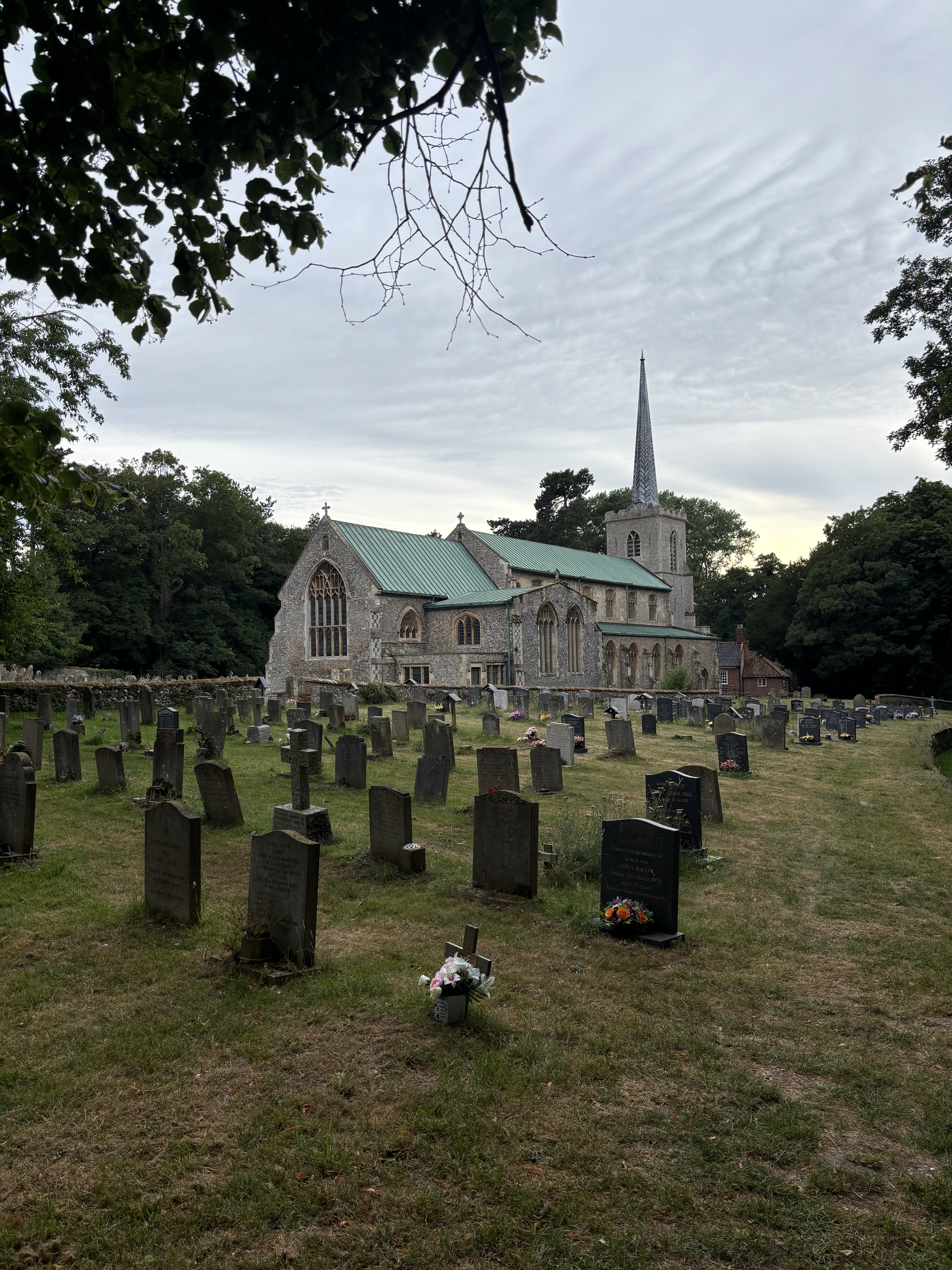
- St Mary and All Saints, Little Walsingham
- 52°53′28″N 0°52′31″E
- OS grid reference: TF 93536 36490
- Denomination: Church of England
- Churchmanship: Anglo-Catholic
- Website: https://walsinghamparishes.org.uk/

History
- Founded: 11th century
- Dedication: St Mary and All Saints

Administration
- Province: Canterbury
- Diocese: Diocese of Norwich
- Archdeaconry: Lynn
- Deanery: Holt
- Parish: Little Walsingham

Clergy
- Vicar: Vacant

St Mary and All Saints Church is the parish church of Little Walsingham in the English county of Norfolk. It is dedicated to the Virgin Mary and All Saints. Walsingham was the location of the shrine of Our Lady of Walsingham, destroyed at the Dissolution. The Anglican shrine was revived by Alfred Hope Patten, the Vicar of Little Walsingham, in 1922, and an image of Our Lady of Walsingham was in the church until its translation to the new priory in 1931.

== Church ==
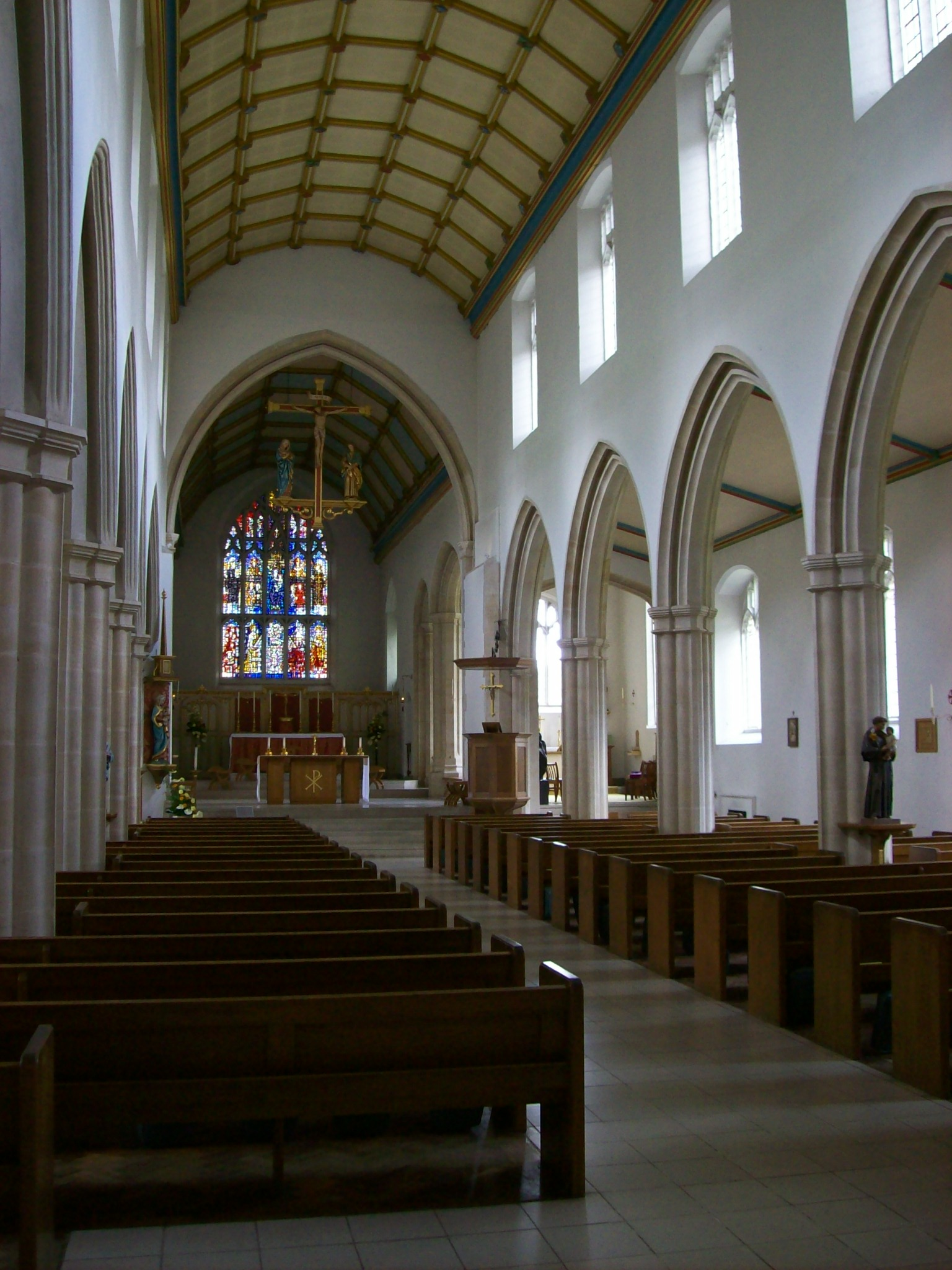
The interior of the church, looking east

The church is 14th and 15th-century, built from flint with stone dressings. In addition to nave and chancel, there are north and south aisles and north and south transepts. The tower is at the west, with a lead needle spire. The church was gutted by fire in 1961; only the tower and north porch remain from the original, the rest of the church having been rebuilt. It is Grade I listed. The churchyard walls and gates are separately listed Grade II.

The original dedication was to All Saints; when Fr Patten became Vicar in 1921 he changed the dedication to the present double dedication of St Mary and All Saints.

There are a number of memorials in the church. The most elaborate memorial is that to Henry Sydney and his wife Jane, formerly in the north transept and now at the rear of the church.

There is a family memorial in the north transept which is a grand edifice with a tall canopy, crocketed and cusped with figures carved on it. This is the Lee-Warner memorial: the grounds of the ruined priory were acquired by John Warner, Bishop of Rochester, in 1637. On his death in 1666, they passed to his nephew, John Lee, Archdeacon of Rochester, who assumed the name Warner.

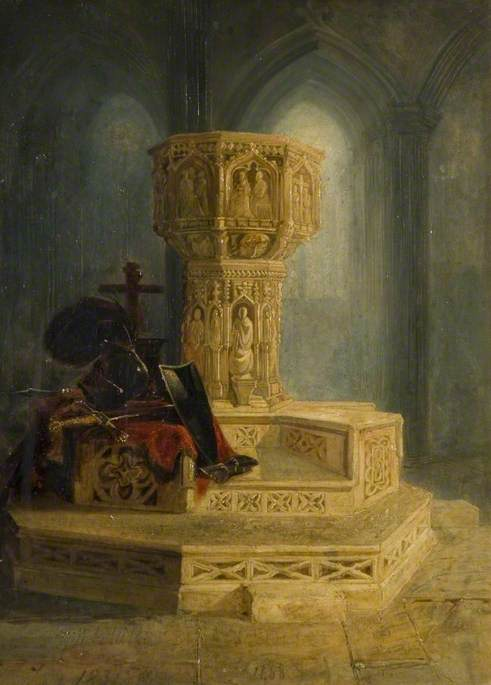
Font, Walsingham Church, by William James Müller

The church is renowned for its font, which is 15th-century and depicts the Seven Sacraments and the Crucifixion. The font survived the fire. The 17th-century font cover did not; the 1964 font cover is a replica of the one that was lost. Birmingham Art Gallery holds a picture of the font by the artist William James Müller. There is a copy of the font in St Joseph's RC Church in Sheringham. A plaster cast of the font was exhibited at the 1851 Great Exhibition.

=== Organs, and the explosion of 1866 ===
An organ was installed into the church in 1862, by the then incumbent, the Rev Septimus Lee-Warner. The consequence of the introduction of the organ was that the church band was rendered redundant. The leader of the band was Miles Brown, a local farmer, builder and demolitions expert. After four years of ill-feeling, matters came to a head on Bonfire Night in 1866, when a "remarkable outrage" occurred. A few minutes after the clerk had tolled the 8 pm curfew bell, an explosion took place in the south transept. A charge of gunpowder had been placed beneath the organ, and ignited. With the exception of the swell organ, the instrument was scattered to pieces, and the window in the south transept completely destroyed. Brown appears to have avoided being charged for the explosion, although shortly afterwards he was charged for exhibiting in the window of a cottage an upright coffin, on the lid of which was a photograph of Lee-Warner, which was taken to be a public threat to take the life of the clergyman. The story of Brown's destruction of the organ was told in a play, The Walsingham Organ, in 2002 by the Eastern Angles Theatre Company.

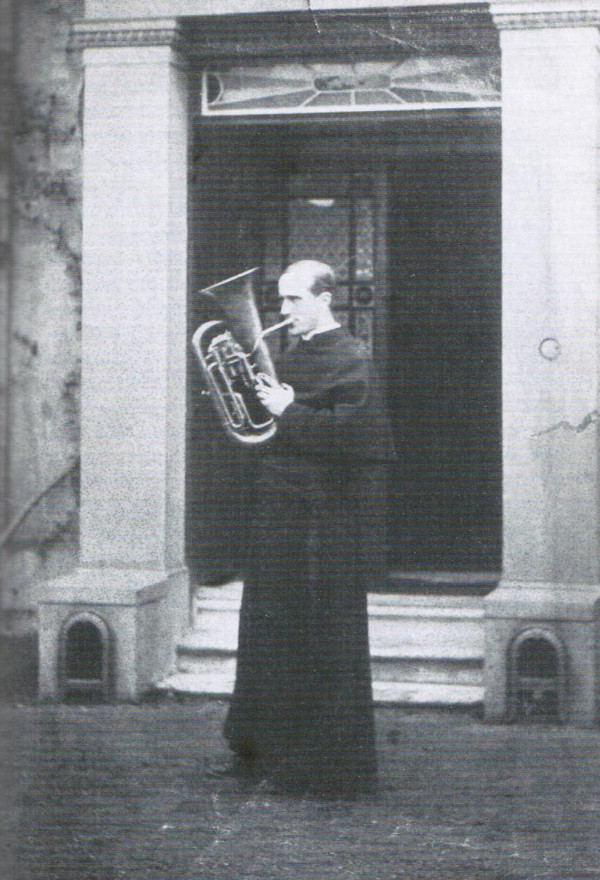
George Ratcliffe Woodward playing the euphonium outside Little Walsingham vicarage

The 1862 organ had been built by Mark Noble of Norwich. It does not appear to have been immediately replaced. The Vicar after next, George Ratcliffe Woodward, was a renowned musician, and played the euphonium during processions, which is suggestive of an absence of an organ. A new organ was installed in 1890, when the Welsh organ-builder Thomas Casson (who went on to establish the Positive Organ Company) made one of his earliest organs. The Casson was still in use at the time of the 1961 fire, in which it was destroyed.

=== Fr Hope Patten and the revival of the shrine ===
The church had first experienced the Catholic Revival of the Church of England in the 1880s after Fr Woodward was appointed as vicar in 1882. Prior to Woodward, Holy Communion had only been celebrated fortnightly. From his first Sunday, Woodward introduced a weekly Communion. Woodward also introduced a surpliced choir, plainsong at evensong (which was daily, and choral), vestments, lighted candles and frequent, although not daily, Holy Communion. Photographs of Woodward often show him wearing a black capello romano, worn only by the most Papalist of Anglican clergy.

Incense was introduced during Fr Edgar Reeves' incumbency (1904-20). Reeves also introduced a statue of Our Lady. By 1919 the Church Times was able to describe it as "the famous pilgrimage church of our Lady". At the end of his incumbency in 1920, Reeves hosted a pilgrimage for the feast of Corpus Christi during which the Eucharist was celebrated with a procession and incense.

Patten was born in 1885. He caught the fervour for Anglo-Catholicism as an altar server at St Michael's Church, Brighton, and, in 1911, went to Lichfield Theological College, followed by a number of curacies. His first curacy (1913-15) was at Holy Cross, Cromer Street, St Pancras, in London, where he was presented with an image of the Holy House of Nazareth by Fr Stanton of St Alban's Church, Holborn. A later curacy (1919-20), was at St Mary the Virgin, Buxted, where in 1886, the Brighton Anglo-Catholic church-builder Fr Arthur Wagner had constructed a new church with a chapel built to the supposed dimensions of the Holy House at Nazareth, which had been reproduced in the mediaeval shrine at Walsingham. By the time Patten arrived in Walsingham as Vicar in 1921, he was a firm Anglican Papalist, convinced of the need to restore pre-Reformation devotions. Our Lady of Walsingham was such a devotion.

On 6 July 1922, with great ceremony and the ringing of church bells, a copy of the throned and crowned mediaeval image of Our Lady of Walsingham was revealed in a side chapel, having processed in from the south porch, past the seven sacrament font.

The first Whitsuntide pilgrimage took place the following year, 1923. It was organised by the League of Our Lady, an Anglican Marian devotional society, which later merged with the Confraternity of Our Lady to form the Society of Mary. The pilgrimage began at the London Anglo-Catholic church of St Magnus-the-Martyr.

The Bishop of Norwich, Bertram Pollock, was unimpressed by the revival of Marianism, and, in 1930, insisted that Patten remove the image from the church. Undeterred, and with financial support from the Anglo-Catholic layman Sir William Milner Bt, Patten bought a plot of land elsewhere in the village to build a new Holy House enclosed in a small church. Crucially, this was on land not owned by the Church of England and, therefore, outside any control of the bishop. The new Holy House was opened in 1931 and was built as a replica of the original shrine, destroyed on the orders of Henry VIII. The translation of the statue to the new shrine took place on 15 October 1931. It began with a High Mass sung by Mowbray O'Rorke, formerly the Bishop of Accra, and by then the Rector of St Nicholas, Blakeney. After Benediction, the statue was carried in procession to the new shrine; the procession was half a mile long.

Patten died on the evening of 11 August 1958. That day had been the first ever episcopal pilgrimage to the shrine. After Benediction had been given, Patten replaced the Blessed Sacrament in the tabernacle of the gallery chapel and then collapsed, dying later that evening.

=== 1961 fire and restoration ===
On 14 July 1961 the church was destroyed by fire, probably the result of arson. The porch and tower survived, including the spire which had been replaced in the 1920s because it had become crooked. The church was rebuilt, by Laurence King, using Ancaster stone.

The church plate was saved, as was Fr Reeves' statue of Our Lady, but everything else was lost. The then Vicar, Fr Roe, issued an appeal in the Church Times for "unwanted vestments of all kinds, cassocks, cottas, hassocks, and copies of the English Hymnal".

The south transept has been converted to a chapel dedicated to St Catherine, the same dedication as the chapel in Houghton Saint Giles where the mediaeval pilgrims stopped, removed their shoes, and walked the last mile to Walsingham barefoot. The north transept has been converted to a chapel named after the Guilds, who built a chapel in that location in the 16th century. The Guilds' Chapel has a reredos by Bodley, depicting the Virgin and Child, accompanied by two angels.

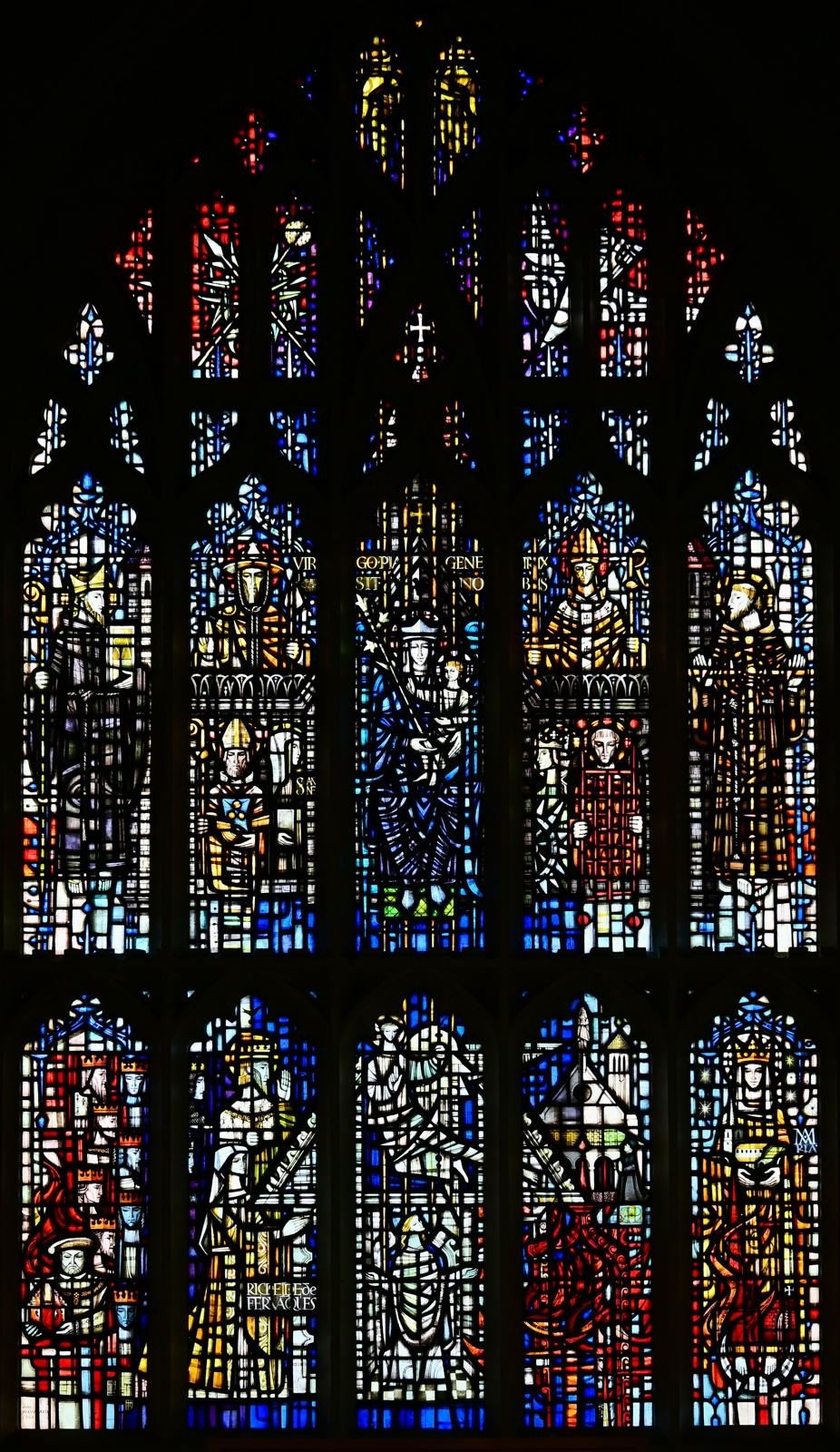
East chancel window by John Hayward (1964)

Most of the stained glass was lost. Although the general approach to the restoration was that of faithful reproduction, a modern approach was taken to the stained glass in the east window. Incorporating surviving pieces of the stained glass where possible, this was made by John Hayward (also the font cover). This depicts the Trinity in the tracery; all the saints who have altars in the church, with an image of Our Lady of Walsingham in the centre of the middle section; and, in the lower section, the story of the Shrine and the church. The windows in the porch survived the fire. They date from 1890, are by Powell, and depict the Annunciation.

As part of the restoration, a new two-manual organ was built by Cedric Arnold, Williamson & Hyatt. This was restored and modified by Holmes & Swift in 1999.

=== Bells ===
The church has a ring of six bells. Two were cast by John I Brend in 1569, one by Edward Tooke in 1675, a further two by James Bartlet of the Whitechapel Bell Foundry in 1691, and a treble bell by Alan Hughes of the Whitechapel Bell Foundry in 1987. The five bells that predate 1961 survived the fire, although they were removed in 1985, when a new frame was built, and replaced in 1987.

== Parish ==
St Mary and All Saints forms a single parish together with the churches of St Peter's, Great Walsingham and St Giles', Houghton Saint Giles. The adjacent parish of Barsham consists of three churches: All Saints, East Barsham, All Saints, North Barsham, and The Assumption of the Blessed Virgin Mary, West Barsham. The two parishes form the Benefice of Walsingham, Houghton and Barsham.

== The Sanctuary School ==
From 1944 to 1956 the church ran a private preparatory school. In 1897 Agnes Eyden founded a small private school in Harrow, which was mixed, and for day pupils only, and which was called Quainton Hall School. In 1923 her son, Fr Montague Eyden, took over the school, and converted it to a boys' preparatory school. Quainton Hall School itself was acquired by the Trustees of the Shrine by gift in 1945. During the War, an 'Evacuation Branch' of the school, for parents who wished to keep their boys away from the risk of German bombing in London, was established in Long Marston, Hertfordshire. In 1944 Patten was approached to accept the school, and it moved to Walsingham, together with its deputy headmaster, Alfred Batts. The vicarage was the boarding house, later expanding to the Friary House elsewhere in the village. Batts left after the first year, and the school was renamed the Sanctuary School. He was replaced with Tom Tapping, who subsequently went on to establish Beeston Hall School in 1948. The next headmaster was Ken Hunter, who went on to establish and be first headmaster of Spratton Hall School, Northamptonshire in 1951. There was one further headmaster before the school closed in 1956.

The masters included Albert Peatfield, by then in his 70s, who had played first-class cricket at the turn of the century. The students included the three Hall-Matthews brothers, the sons of the Rev Cecil Berners Hall, who had been headmaster of Bishop Westcott Boys' School, Namkum and then the Lawrence Memorial Royal Military School, Lovedale in India. Tony Hall-Matthews went on to become the last Bishop of Carpentaria in Australia, 1984–96.

== Clergy ==
Details of early clergy are difficult to ascertain with certainty. Venn confuses Little Walsingham (also known as New Walsingham) with Great Walsingham (also known as Old Walsingham). The two parishes were not consolidated until the incumbency of Edgar Lee Reeves (1904−1920), by when the patronage had descended from the Lee-Warners to the Gurneys. This confusion is compounded in the Lee-Warner era, when members of the family were both patron and incumbent.

- 1807−1834: Rev. James Lee-Warner
- 1834−1859: Rev. James Lee-Warner (son of the above)
- 1859−1870: Rev. Septimus Henry Lee-Warner (cousin of the above)
- 1871−1882: Rev. William Martin (later Vicar of East Barsham)
- 1882−1888: Rev. George Ratcliffe Woodward (son-in-law of the Rev. Septimus Lee-Warner and author of musical verse, including This joyful Eastertide and Ding Dong Merrily on High)
- 1889−1904: Rev. Henry Arthur Wansbrough (son-in-law of the Rt. Rev. Edward Tufnell and grandfather of Henry Wansbrough)
- 1904−1920: Rev. Edgar Lee Reeves (son-in-law of the Rev. Richard Enraght)
- 1921−1958: Rev. Alfred Hope Patten
- 1958−1977: Rev. Alan Arthur Roe
- 1977−1989: Rev. John Edgar Barnes (who converted to Roman Catholicism in 1995, the same year he published a biography of ones of his predecessors, George Ratcliffe Woodward, 1848-1934, Priest, Poet and Musician)
- 1989−1995: Rev. Michael John Rear (who converted to Roman Catholicism in 1996)
- 1995−1999: Rev. Keith Frank Michael Haydon
- 2000−2012: Rev. Norman Banks (later Bishop of Richborough)
- 2013−2018: Rev. Andrew Mark Mitcham
- 2018−2025: Rev. Harri Alan McClelland Williams (subsequently appointed Principal of St Stephen's House, Oxford)
