= Robert Billing (priest) =

British Roman Catholic priest

The Reverend Robert Billing
- Rector of the Basilica and National Shrine of Our Lady of Walsingham
- Church: Roman Catholic Church
- Province: Archdiocese of Liverpool
- Diocese: Diocese of Lancaster
- Installed: 24th September 2023
- Predecessor: Philip Moger

Orders
- Ordination: 14th July 2001

Personal details
- Denomination: Roman Catholic

Robert Billing is a British Roman Catholic priest who is the current Rector of the Basilica and National Shrine of Our Lady of Walsingham since September 2023.

== Brief biography ==
On 14 July 2001, Robert Billing was ordained a Roman Catholic Priest for the Diocese of Lancaster.

Before he take up the position as Rector of the Basilica and National Shrine of Our Lady of Walsingham, Billing has served as the Private Secretary to three Bishops of Lancaster over a period of 13 years.

On 12 July 2023, it was announced that the Bishop of East Anglia, Peter Collins, had appointed Billing as Rector of the Basilica and National Shrine of Our Lady of Walsingham, succeeding Monsignor Philip Moger, who had been appointed Auxiliary Bishop of Southwark.

== See also ==
- Walsingham
- Basilica and National Shrine of Our Lady of Walsingham
- Catholic Bishops' Conference of England and Wales
