= John Loughlin (political scientist) =

Northern Irish academic and former monk

- Born: John Loughlin; 1948 (age 77–78); Belfast

Academic background
- Education: St. Malachy's College, Belfast
- Alma mater: Ulster Polytechnic; European University Institute, Florence, Italy
- Thesis: Regionalism and ethnic nationalism in France : a case study of Corsica (1987)

Academic work
- Discipline: Politics
- Sub-discipline: European politics
- Institutions: Erasmus University of Rotterdam; University of Cardiff

John Loughlin, FAcSS, FLSW (born 1948) is a British-based academic and educator from Northern Ireland, and a noted specialist in European territorial politics.

== Career ==
Loughlin attended St Finian's Primary School followed by St. Malachy's College, Belfast. He then spent several years as a Cistercian monk at Portglenone Abbey where he carried out the usual studies for the priesthood in philosophy, theology and biblical studies.

From 1978-1982 he attended the Ulster Polytechnic from which he graduated with BA (Hons) in history and politics. He proceeded to the European University Institute in Florence, Italy, from which he was awarded a doctorate (Doctor of Political and Social Sciences) in 1987 for a thesis entitled Regionalism and ethnic nationalism in France: a case study of Corsica.

He returned to the Ulster University in 1985 where he remained for six years before moving to the Erasmus University of Rotterdam for four years. In 1995 he was appointed professor of European politics at the University of Cardiff. He was a Fellow of St Edmund's College where he directed the Von Hügel Institute until his retirement in September 2015. He was also a senior fellow and affiliated lecturer at the Department of Politics and International Studies of the University of Cambridge.

Since 2015 he has been Senior Research Fellow at Blackfriars Hall, University of Oxford.

During his career he held a number of honorary positions at various institutions. These included:

- Visiting professor, St Mary's University, Twickenham, London (2017–2020)
- Adjunct professor in Peace and Conflict Studies at Umeå University, Sweden (2010–2013)
- Maître de conférences, Université libre de Bruxelles (2009–2013)
- Professeur invité, Institut d'Etudes Politiques d'Aix-en-Provence (2004–2010)
- Visiting research fellow, Merton College Oxford University, 2004 (currently member of the Senior Common Room)
- European Studies Centre Visiting Research Fellow at St Antony's College Oxford University, 2005–06 (currently member of the Senior Common Room)
- Distinguished visiting research fellow at the Graduate School of Humanities and Social Sciences in Queen Mary, University of London, 2009
- Visiting scholar of the Residential Colloquium at the Center of Theological Inquiry (founded by Princeton Theological Seminary but now an independent research institute), 2010

== Memberships ==
- Oblate of the Order of St Benedict (OSB Obl.) of Prinknash Abbey, Gloucestershire, United Kingdom
- Catholic Writers Guild, United Kingdom 2012

== Awards ==
- Honorary doctorate, University of Umeå, Sweden (October 2009) "in recognition of his contribution to research in the field of European politics and territorial governance".
- Officier, Ordre des Palmes Académiques, France (2010) "in recognition of his research on European politics and his contribution to French language and culture".
- Honorary professor, Cardiff University (2010–2015)
- Chaire Ganshof van der Meersch, Université libre de Bruxelles (2013–14)
- Entry into Who's Who UK – 2013
- Fellow, Royal Historical Society – 2009
- Fellow, Royal Society of Arts – 2009–2016
- Fellow, Academy of Social Sciences – 2010
- Fellow, European Academy of Sciences and Arts – 2013
- Fellow, Learned Society of Wales – 2014

== Publications ==
He is the author of the authoritative Oxford Handbook of Local and Regional Democracy in Europe, and numerous other books and conference proceedings, published in several languages. More recently he has focused on theology and political philosophy. His study ‘’Human Dignity: its Roots and Challenges in Western Thought’’ was published by Bloomsbury T&T Clark in 2026. ISBN 9780567726407

=== Books ===
- (Edited with Mark Callanan) 'A Research Agenda for Regional and Local Government'Edward Elgar, 2021 ISBN 9781839106637
- (Edited with Sandrina Antunes) 'Europeanization and Territorial Politics in Small European Unitary States: A Comparative Analysis' Routledge, 2020 ISBN 9780367629632
- (editor) 'Human Dignity in the Judaeo-Christian Tradition: Catholic, Orthodox, Anglican and Orthodox Perspectives' Bloomsbury Press, 2019 ISBN 9781350073692
- (edited with John Kincaid and Wilfried Swenden)'Routledge Handbook of Regionalism & Federalism', London: Routledge, 2013 ISBN 9780367581879
- (edited with Frank Hendriks and Anders Lidstrom), The Oxford Handbook of Local and Regional Democracy in Europe Oxford University Press, 2010; paperback 2011, ISBN 9780199562978
- Subnational Government: the French Experience (Macmillan Palgrave, 2007) In 263 libraries according to
- (with Mirela Bogdani) Albania and the European Union: The Tumultuous Journey to Integration and Accession, (London: IB Tauris, 2007)
- Subnational Democracy in the European Union: Challenges and Opportunities (Oxford University Press, hardcover 2001; paperback 2004)
- (with M. Keating and K. Deschouwer), Culture, Institutions and Regional Development: a Study of Eight European Regions, (Cheltenham: Edward Elgar, 2003)
- (edited with Kris Deschouwer), The Transformation of Territorial Governance in the 21st Century, (Brussels: Flemish Academy of Belgium for Arts and Sciences, 2007)
- (edited with David Hanley), Spanish Political Parties, (Cardiff: Wales University Press, 2006)
- (edited with Alain Delcamp), La décentralisation dans les Etats de l'Union européenne, Coll. Les Etudes, (Paris: La Documentation Française, 2003, 2ième édition)
- (edited with Claude Olivesi and F. Daftary), Autonomies Insulaires: vers une politique de différence pour la Corse (Ajaccio: Albiana, 1999)
- Regional and local democracy in the European Union Luxembourg: Office for Official Publications of the European Communities, 1999
  - also published in German as Die regionale und lokale Demokratie in der Europäischen Union 1999
  - Also published in Danish as: Det regionale og lokale demokrati i Den Europæiske Union. Luxembourg: Kontoret for De Europæiske Fællesskabers Officielle Publikationer, 1999
  - also published in Dutch as Regionale en lokale democratie in de Europese Unie 1999
  - also published in French as Démocratie locale et régionale dans l'Union européenne 1999
  - also published in Portuguese as A democracia regional e local na União Européia 1999
  - also published in Italian as La democrazia regionale e locale nell'Unione europea. 1999
- (edited with Michael Keating), The Political Economy of Regionalism (London: Routledge, 1997)
- (edited with Sonia Mazey), The End of the French Unitary State? Ten Years of Regionalization in France (London: Frank Cass Ltd., 1995)
- (edited with Arenilla Saez and T. Toonen) Europa de las Regiones: una Perspectiva Intergubernatal (Granada: University of Granada, 1994)
- (edited) Southern Europe Studies Guide (Bowker Saur Ltd, London, UK, 1993)
  - Review, by Richard Gillespie West European politics. 18, no. 2, (1995): 457
- (edited with M. Connolly) Public Policy in Northern Ireland: Adoption or adaptation? (Belfast: Policy Research Institute, 1990)

=== Periodical special issues ===
- (Guest editor with David Hanley), Religion et Politique, (Revue de Science Politique de l’Europe Méridionale. No. 17; Nov. 2002)

=== Peer-reviewed periodical articles (selected) ===
- "'Europe of the Regions' and the Federalization of Europe". 1996 Publius, pp 141–162
- (with Anders Lidstrom, and Chris Hudson. 2005. "The Politics of Local Income Tax in Sweden: Reform and Continuity". Local Government Studies. 31, no. 3: 351
- "Reconfiguring the State: Trends in Territorial Governance in European States" (2007) Regional &; Federal Studies. 17, no. 4: 385–403
