= Guild of Our Lady of Ransom =

Catholic charity organization

- Formation: 29 November 1877; 148 years ago
- Registration no.: 232716
- Legal status: Charity
- Purpose: Furtherance of the Catholic Church in England and Wales.
- Headquarters: UK
- Region served: England and Wales
- Activities: Grants; Pilgrimages; Publications
- President: His Holiness The Pope
- Master: Mgr John Armitage
- Website: www.guild-ransom.co.uk

The Guild of Our Lady of Ransom is a charity, founded in 1877, which supports projects and initiatives in the Catholic Church in England and Wales, through its grant programme and network of members.

== History ==
In 1886, the Catholic priest, The Reverend Fr Philip Fletcher (1848–1928) established a Union of Intercession for the Conversion of England. A graduate of Exeter College, Oxford, Fletcher was the son of Sir Henry Fletcher, 3rd Baronet, and curate at St Bartholomew's Church, Brighton. One of Fletcher's friends was barrister and orator, Lister Drummond (1856–1916), a convert to Catholicism. Drummond was the only son of Maurice Drummond and Hon. Adelaide Lister (eldest daughter of 2nd Lord Ribblesdale) and a descendant of the Jacobite rebel, William Drummond, 4th Viscount Strathallan.

A year later, on 29 November 1887, Fletcher and Drummond established the Guild of Our Lady of Ransom to involve Catholics in evangelisation and the conversion to the Catholic faith of the people of England and Wales, in the restoration of those who have lapsed from the practice of their faith, and for the praying for those who have died who have no-one to pray for them.

The Guild took two medieval orders as its model: the Trinitarians and the Mercedarians. It was dedicated to Our Lady, St Gregory and the English Martyrs and took as its prayer as that of the Blessed Henry Heath on the scaffold at Tyburn in 1643: "Jesu convert England, have mercy on this country". The Guild members (known as Ransomers) were originally composed of White Cross (clerical), Red Cross (evangelical), and Blue Cross (supplicant) Ransomers.

Thousands of Catholics enrolled in the Guild, including the Cardinals Henry Edward Manning and Herbert Vaughan, Archbishops of Westminster, and Saint John Henry Newman (as White Cross Ransomers).

The Guild was recognised and blessed by Pope Leo XIII in 1900 who became its first President, and each Pope since then has served as President of the Guild. It was registered as a charity in 1965. The Guild's current Master is Mgr John Armitage.

== Activities ==
Pilgrimages

For many years, the Guild has organised pilgrimages for its Ransomers to sites of devotion overseas, including Marian shrines such as those at Boulogne and Halle. It organised an annual pilgrimage to York from 1892. It also the first public pilgrimage since the Reformation to the Basilica of Our Lady of Walsingham on 20 August 1897. It also arranged pilgrimages in the British Isles, such as to Glastonbury, and sites at Canterbury, Chelsea, Hastings, Holywell, Padley, King's Lynn, Westminster, Willesden, York, and Walsingham.

In 2019, as part of the spiritual preparation for England's re-dedication as the Dowry of Mary, the Guild and Our Lady of Walsingham organised a two-year Dowry Tour of England's Catholic Cathedrals, including Liverpool's Metropolitan Cathedral, and St John's Cathedral, Norwich.

Ransom and Dowry Grants

The Guild organisation, supported by a network of members, offers grants to parishes and churches in England and Wales. With an emphasis on evangelisation, the Guild aims to enable parishes, ministries and individuals to promote Catholicism. It has two programmes: Ransom Grants and Dowry Grants.

Ransom Grants support parishes which are in need of funding, and especially those which are working on evangelistic and formative projects.

Dowry Grants support new and innovative works of evangelisation which promote the Catholic faith.

== Masters ==
- 1877–1928 The Rev. Philip Fletcher
- 1928–51 Mgr John Henry Filmer
- 1951 68 Mgr Laurance Goulder
- 1968–2010 Mgr Anthony George Stark
- 2010–20 The Rt Rev. Peter Smith
- 2020– Mgr John Armitage

== Publications ==
The Guild has published various books and pamphlets over the decades, including the following titles:

General Pamphlets

- Catholic Processions [A defence of the right to hold public processions] (1st ed.), London, 1908, OCLC 751619753.
- White, Albert Clement (1909), The Case for Convents, London, OCLC 753203424.
- Blyton, W.J. (1924), The witness from outside, London, OCLC 315258291.
- Blyton, W.J. (1925), More tributes to the Church from non-Catholics, London, OCLC 315258276.
- Hanifin, Ernest D. (1926), Benediction for the conversion of England: With devotions from approved sources, London, OCLC 319993725.
- The Ransom Prayer Book – Ransom Prayers – for the Conversion of England and Wales (1st ed.), London, 1978, OCLC 601952316.
- Decretum Birminghamien canonizationis servi die Ioannis Henrici Newman: S.R.E. cardinalis, foundatoris Oratoriorum S. Philippi Neri in Anglia (1801–1890), (Decree of the Sacred Congregation for the Causes of Saints, concerning the cause of canonisation of ... John Henry Newman, Cardinal of the Holy Roman Church) (1st ed.), London, 1991, OCLC 25500408.
- Walsingham: 1061–1538, 1897–1997: A centenary celebration (1st ed.), London, 1998, ISBN 9780953286607.

Pilgrimage Pamphlets

- Goulder, Laurance (1962), Canterbury, Pilgrimage Pamphlets No. 1 (1st ed. 1954) (2nd ed.), London, OCLC 11720711.
- Goulder, Laurance (1967), Westminster, Pilgrimage Pamphlets No. 2 (1st ed. 1960) (3rd ed.), London.
- Goulder, Laurance (1960), The Universities: Part 1: History, Pilgrimage Pamphlets No. 3 (1st ed.), London, OCLC 30197894.
- Goulder, Laurance (1960), The Universities: Part 2, Pilgrimage Pamphlets No. 3 (1st ed.), London, OCLC 30197894.
- Goulder, Laurance (1982), London: Part 1: General History, Pilgrimage Pamphlets No. 4 (1st ed. 1960; 2nd ed. 1982) (3rd ed.), London, OCLC 931100477.
- Goulder, Laurance (1989), London: Part 2: The Tower Pilgrimage, Pilgrimage Pamphlets No. 4 (1st ed. 1960; 2nd ed. 1982) (3rd ed.), London, OCLC 931100477.
- Goulder, Laurance (1964), London: Part 3: The City Pilgrimage, Pilgrimage Pamphlets No. 4 (1st ed. 1960; 2nd ed. 1982) (2nd ed.), London, OCLC 931100477.
- Goulder, Laurance (1962), York, Pilgrimage Pamphlets (1st ed.), London.
- Judkins, John (1964), The Walsingham Walk, Pilgrimage Pamphlets (1st ed.), London, OCLC 56002073.
- Goulder, Laurance (1967), Church Life In Medieval England: Part 1: The Parishes, Pilgrimage Pamphlets No. 8 (1st ed.), London, OCLC 931308083.
- Goulder, Laurance (1967), Church Life In Medieval England: Part 2: The Monasteries, Pilgrimage Pamphlets No. 8 (1st ed.), London, OCLC 931308083.
- Goulder, Laurance (1966), Norwich, Pilgrimage Pamphlets (1st ed.), London.
- Goulder, Laurance (1968), Coventry and Lichfield, Pilgrimage Pamphlets (1st ed.), London.
- Goulder, Laurance (1965), Winchester, Pilgrimage Pamphlets (1st ed.), London.
- Goulder, Laurance (1970), Chichester and Lewes, Pilgrimage Pamphlets No. 11 (1st ed.), London, OCLC 751256365.

Biographical Pamphlets

- Newman, Antonias (1977), Saint Teresa of Avila (1st ed.), London, OCLC 1369844954.
- Stark, Anthony (1978), Thomas More, most human of saints (1st ed.), London, OCLC 85089866.
- Stark, Anthony (1980), Bishop Richard Challoner: His Life and Times (1st ed.), London, OCLC 54939909.
- Stark, Anthony (1980), Cardinal John Henry Newman: A Study in Holiness (2nd ed.), London (1st ed. 1975), OCLC 16485769.
- Hume, Basil (1980), Cardinal John Henry Newman: A saint for our time? (1st ed.), London, OCLC 1039148460.
