= Hibbertia perfoliata =

Scientific classification
- Kingdom: Plantae
- Clade: Tracheophytes
- Clade: Angiosperms
- Clade: Eudicots
- Order: Dilleniales
- Family: Dilleniaceae
- Genus: Hibbertia
- Species: H. perfoliata

Binomial name
- Hibbertia perfoliata Hügel ex Endl.

Species of flowering plant

Hibbertia perfoliata is a species of flowering plant in the family Dilleniaceae and is endemic to Western Australia. It is a weak, ascending or prostrate, spreading shrub that typically grows to a height of up to 40 cm (16 in). It flowers from September to December or from January to March and has yellow flowers. The species was first formally described in 1837 by Stephan Endlicher from an unpublished description by Charles von Hügel and Endlicher's description was published in his book Enumeratio plantarum quas in Novae Hollandiae ora austro-occidentali ad fluvium Cygnorum et in sinu Regis Georgii collegit Carolus Liber Baro de Hügel. The specific epithet (perfoliata) means "perfoliate".

This species grows in winter-wet places and near streams and swamps in the Jarrah Forest, Swan Coastal Plain and Warren biogeographic regions of south-western Western Australia and is classified as "not threatened" by the Western Australian Government Department of Parks and Wildlife.

This species was revised in 2024.

== See also ==
- List of Hibbertia species
