= Corpus Christi Church, Boscombe =

Church in Dorset, England

Corpus Christi Church
- Catholic Church of Corpus Christi, Boscombe
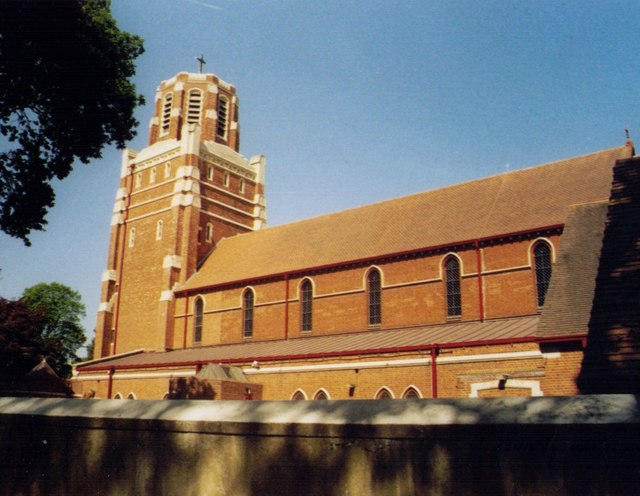
- South side of the church

- Location of church within Dorset
- 50.727315°N 1.829851°W
- OS grid reference: SZ 12089 91974
- Location: Boscombe, Dorset
- Country: England
- Denomination: Roman Catholic
- Website: CorpusChristiBoscombe.org.uk

History
- Status: Active
- Founded: 1895
- Founder: Baroness Pauline von Hugel
- Dedication: Body of Christ
- Consecrated: 8 September 1896
- Events: Extended 1932-34; Re-ordered 1974

Architecture
- Functional status: Parish Church
- Heritage designation: Grade II
- Designated: 27 February 1976
- Architect: J. William Lunn
- Style: Gothic Revival
- Groundbreaking: 22 August 1895
- Completed: 22 April 1934
- Construction cost: £5000 (£15,000 extension)

Specifications
- Capacity: 800

Administration
- Province: Southwark
- Diocese: Portsmouth
- Deanery: Bournemouth

Corpus Christi Church is a Roman Catholic church in Boscombe, on the outskirts of Bournemouth in Dorset. It was founded by Baroness Pauline von Hügel and the Jesuits, and is currently served by the Diocese of Portsmouth. It is situated on St James' Square, on the corner of Parkwood Road and Christchurch Road. It was founded in 1895 and from its 108 ft tall bell tower, it is possible to see the Isle of Wight.

== History ==
=== Founding ===
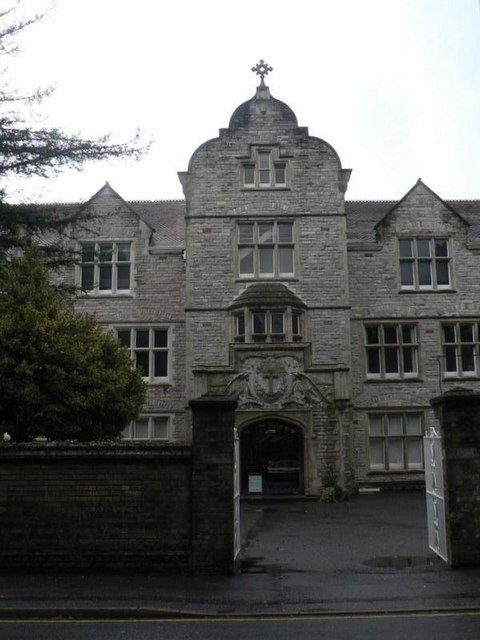
Entrance of the former Convent of the Cross, which neighbours the church and the primary school

The first Catholic place of worship in Boscombe was created in 1887 when the Religious of the Cross moved into the area to make a foundation there. They purchased four and a half acres of land on which John Vertue, the first Bishop of Portsmouth, erected a small public chapel, an iron building bought from Lord Petre. This iron chapel was formally opened on New Year's Day 1888 and was served from Bournemouth by the Jesuit priest there, Father Charles de Lapasture SJ. The building of the convent itself started on 6 September 1888. A year later, a school was built next door, Corpus Christi Primary School.

If Corpus Christi church could be said to have had a founder, it would have to be Baroness Pauline von Hügel. She was the daughter of the Austrian nobleman, army officer and botanist Charles von Hügel (1795–1870) and sister of the theologian Friedrich von Hügel (1852–1925), and anthropologist Anatole von Hügel (1854–1928). With the school being built, there arose the need for a permanent church. The Baroness resolved to build a church that would meet the needs of both parishioners and the nearby Sisters, and to this end bought a property known as 'Holyrood' and two acres of land stretching from Christchurch Road to the Convent garden.

=== Construction ===
Building work on the church started in 1885. The architect was J. William Lunn from Malvern, Worcestershire who also designed Our Lady of the Annunciation Church, King's Lynn, St Catherine's Church in Chipping Campden and St Edmund Church in Southampton. On 8 September 1896 it was opened by Bishop John Vertue. Baroness Pauline von Hügel decided to give the church to the Society of Jesus so that Father de Lapasture SJ became the first parish priest. The church was built to have a height of fifty metres along the nave and could accommodate a congregation of 400 people.

=== Enlargement ===
In 1926, Father Ralph Baines SJ became parish priest and he decided to enlarge the church. An extension fund was opened to be able to pay for the scheme which was estimated to cost £15,000. Work commenced in August 1932 and was completed by March 1934. The enlarged church could hold 800 people with the most prominent new feature being a tower at 108 feet high. It was blessed by Bishop Cotter on 22 April 1934.

=== Reordering ===
In 1974, to meet the requirements set down by the Second Vatican Council, that the congregation should all have a clear view of the altar, the sanctuary was again modified with the altar being moved forward. On completion of this work, the church was consecrated by Bishop Derek Worlock, on 18 July 1974.

== Parish ==
In 2007, the Jesuit presence in the area expanded with the opening of the Corpus Christi Jesuit Community Care Home adjacent to the church. Corpus Christi has a number of parish groups and organisations, prayer groups, music groups and choirs.

Also, next door to the church is Corpus Christi Primary School. It is a voluntary assisted school for children from the ages of 4 to 11 years. In May 2022, it was announced that the Jesuits would no longer be able to serve the parish. The parish was then handed over to the Catholic Diocese of Portsmouth who continue to administer it.

== Interior ==
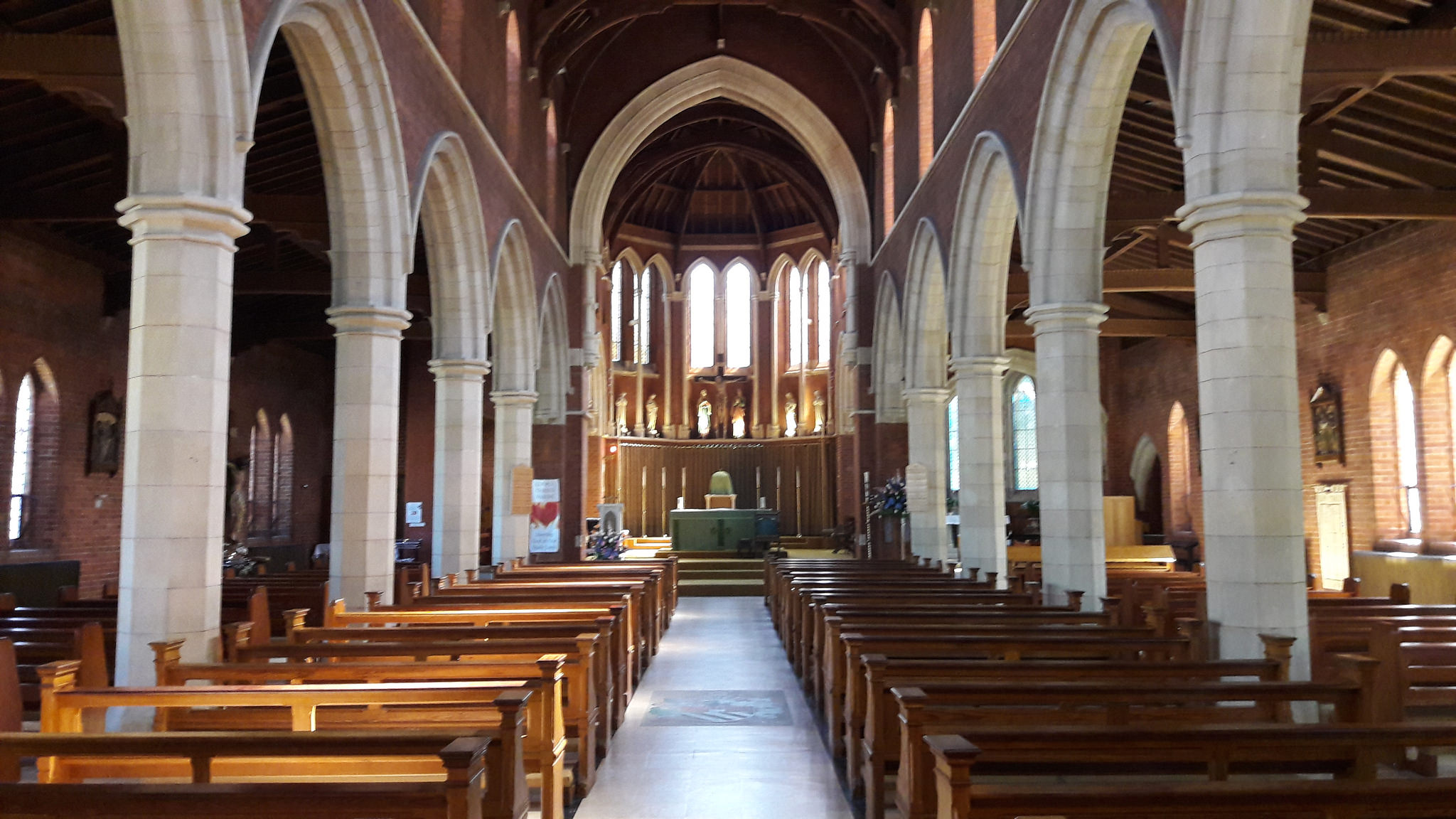
Interior

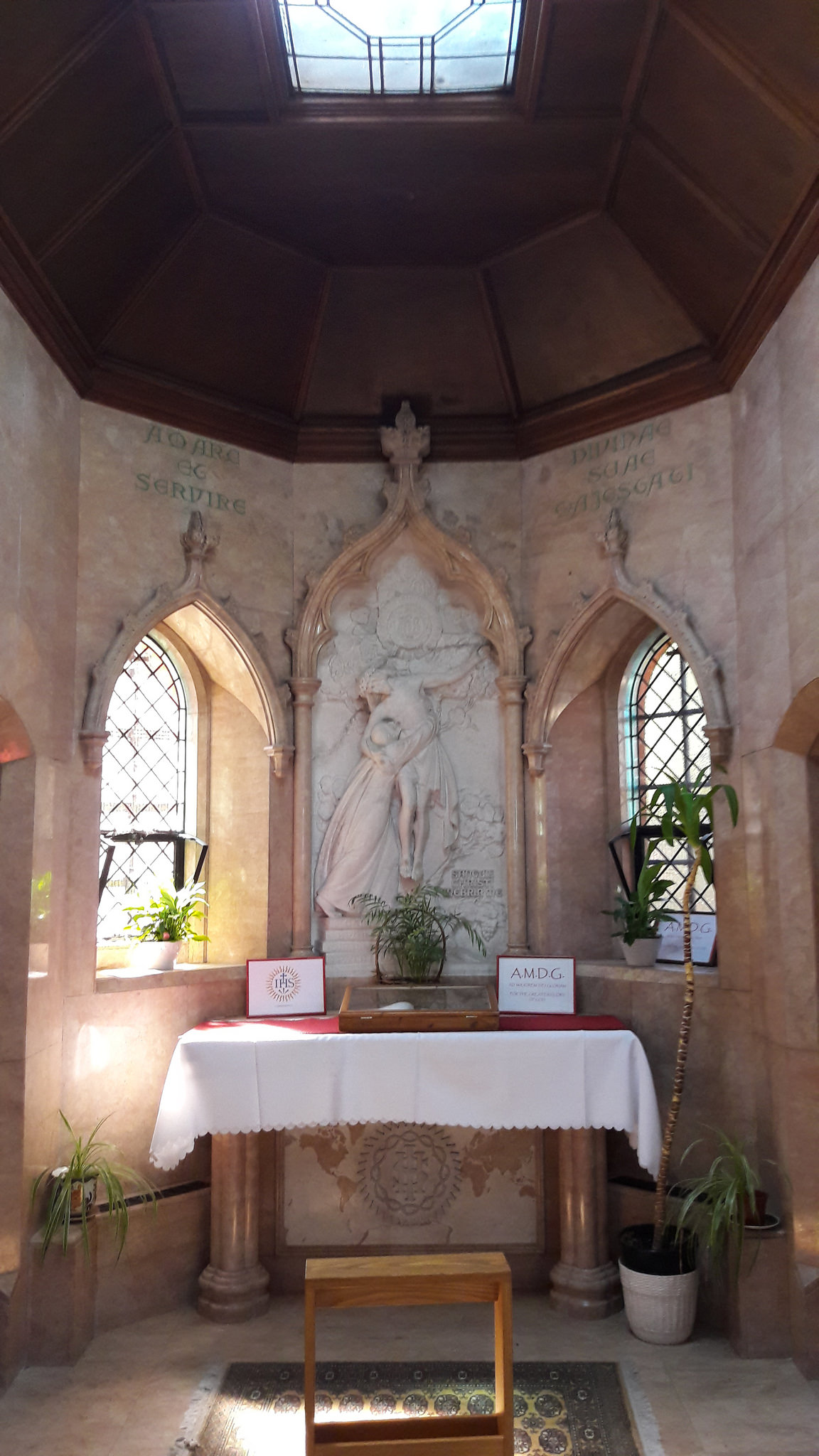
Side chapel

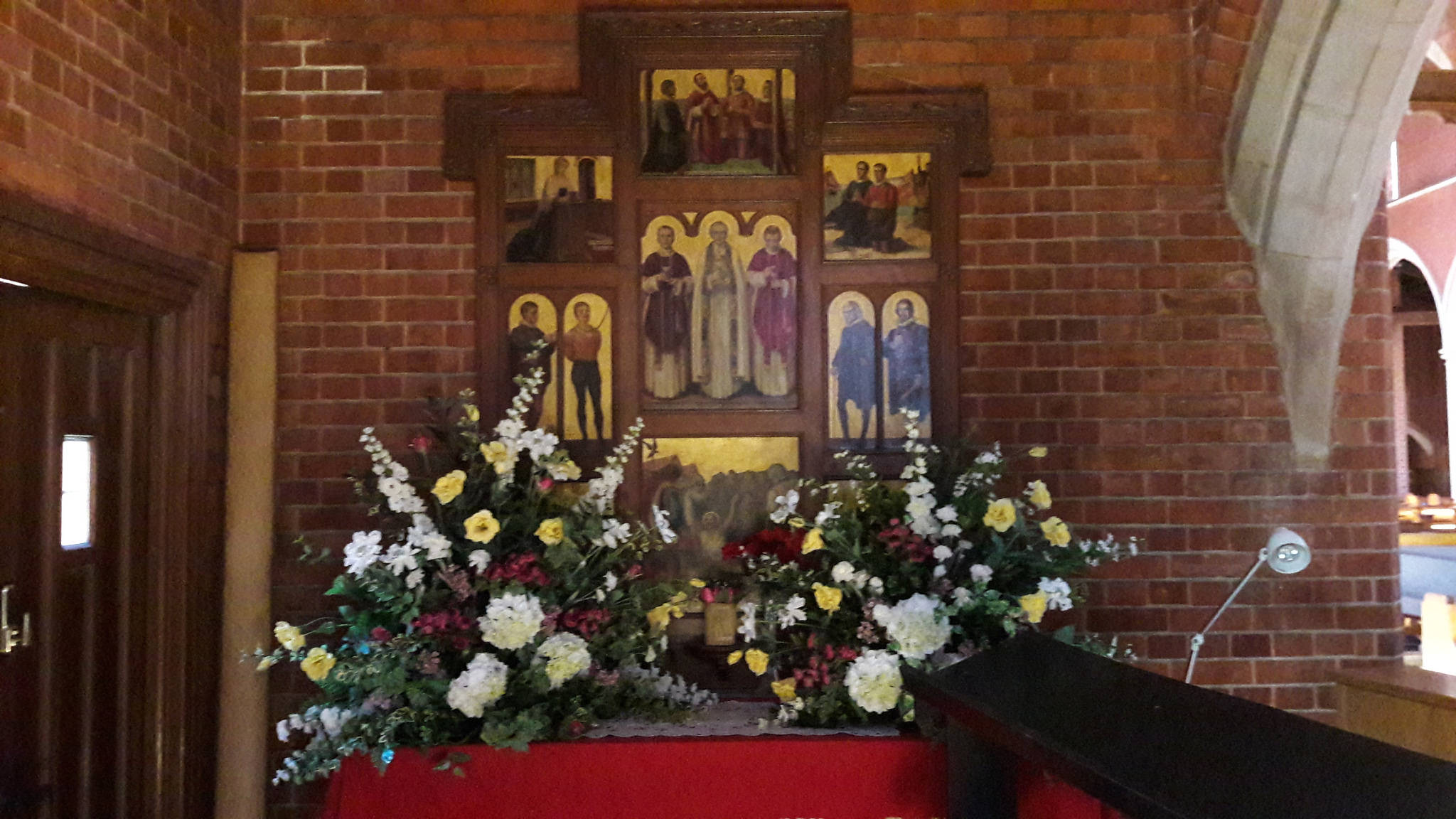
Martyrs chapel

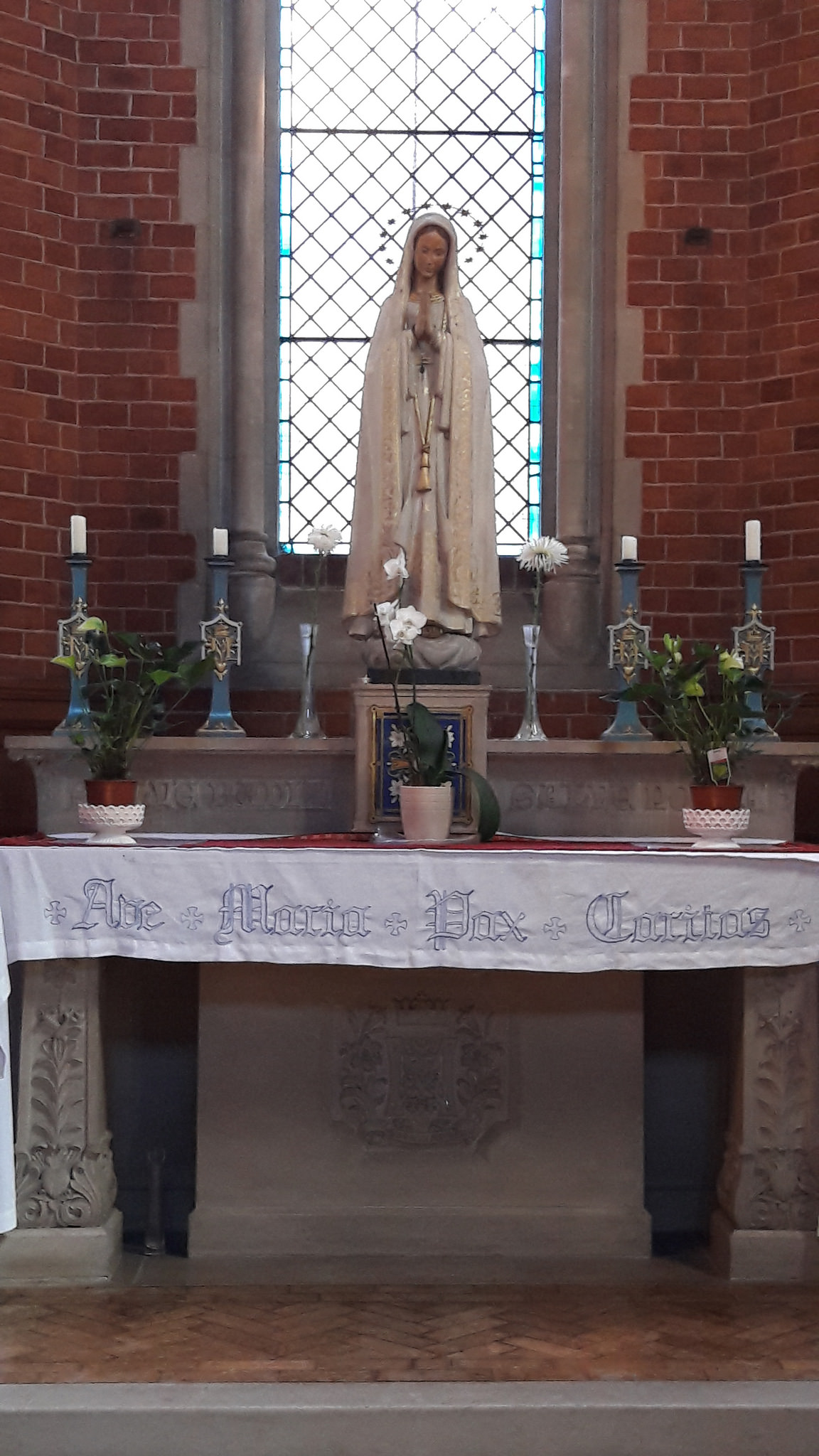
Lady chapel

== See also ==
- List of Jesuit sites
