= John Armitage (priest) =

British priest

Right Reverend Monsignor John Armitage
- Church: Roman Catholic Church
- Province: Diocese of Westminster
- Diocese: Diocese of Brentwood

Orders
- Ordination: 16 June 1979

Personal details
- Denomination: Roman Catholic
- Parents: John and Patricia Armitage (Nee Major)

John Armitage is a British Roman Catholic priest who served as Rector of the National Basilica of Our Lady of Walsingham from 2014 to 2020.

== Career ==
On the 16th of June 1979, John Armitage was ordained a Roman Catholic priest.

In 2014, it was announced that Armitage would take up the position of Rector of the National Basilica of Our Lady of Walsingham, leaving the role of Vicar General for the Diocese of Brentwood.

On the 29th of March 2020, Armitage took part in the rededication of England to the Dowry of Mary at the Basilica of Our Lady of Walsingham, Norfolk.

In 2020, Armitage was replaced as Rector of the Basilica by Philip Moger. Armitage's final mass as Rector of the Basilica took place on the 30 August 2020.

In July 2020, the Guild of Our Lady of Ransom appointed Armitage as Master of the Guild.

== Media Appearances ==
On the 11th of August 2011, Armitage spoke out about the London Riots and how the local Catholic Church was attempting to "dampen down the tensions."

== See also ==
- Walsingham
- Catholic Bishops' Conference of England and Wales
