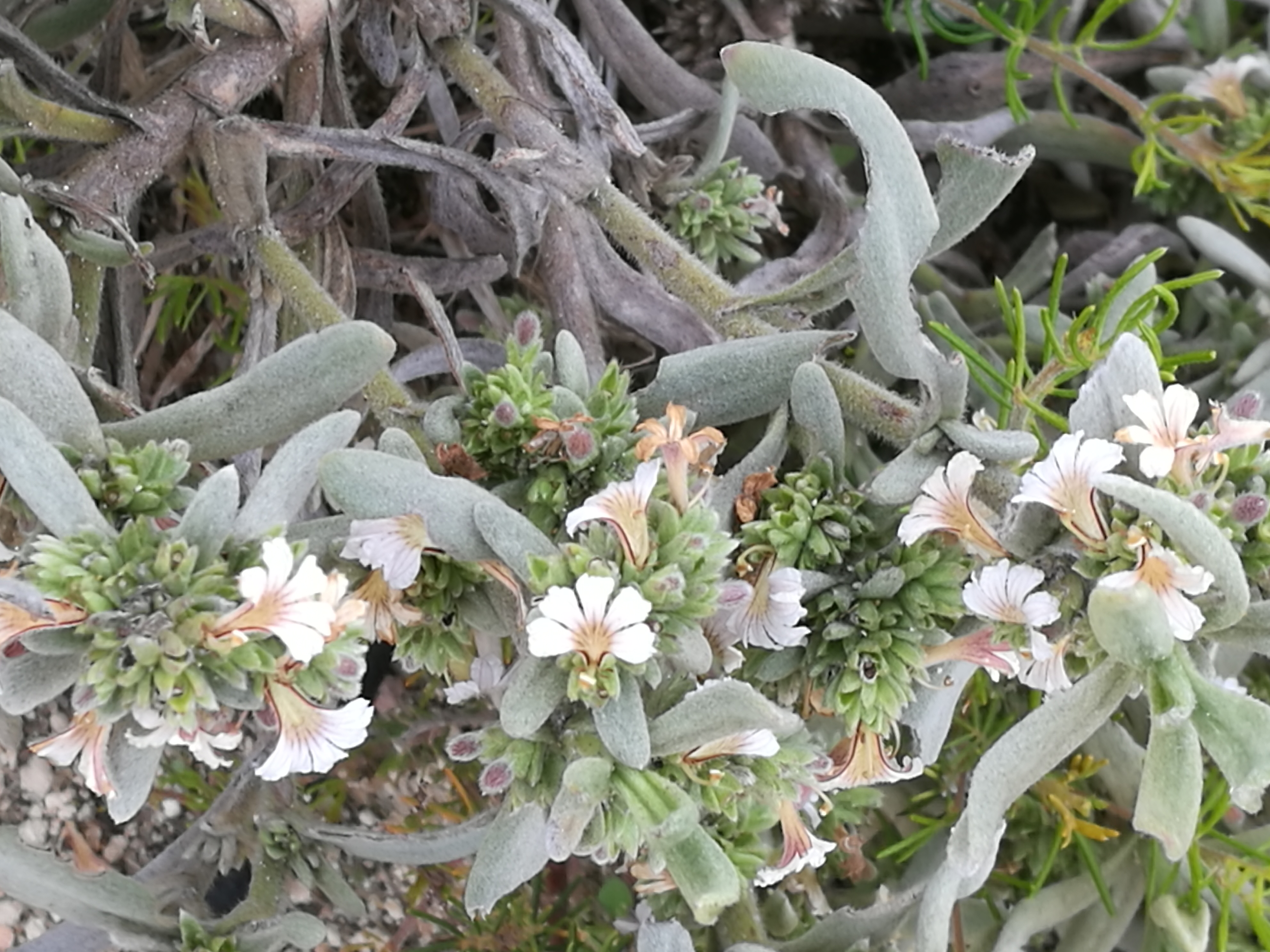

Scientific classification
- Kingdom: Plantae
- Clade: Embryophytes
- Clade: Tracheophytes
- Clade: Spermatophytes
- Clade: Angiosperms
- Clade: Eudicots
- Clade: Asterids
- Order: Asterales
- Family: Goodeniaceae
- Genus: Scaevola
- Species: S. canescens

Binomial name
- Scaevola canescens Benth.
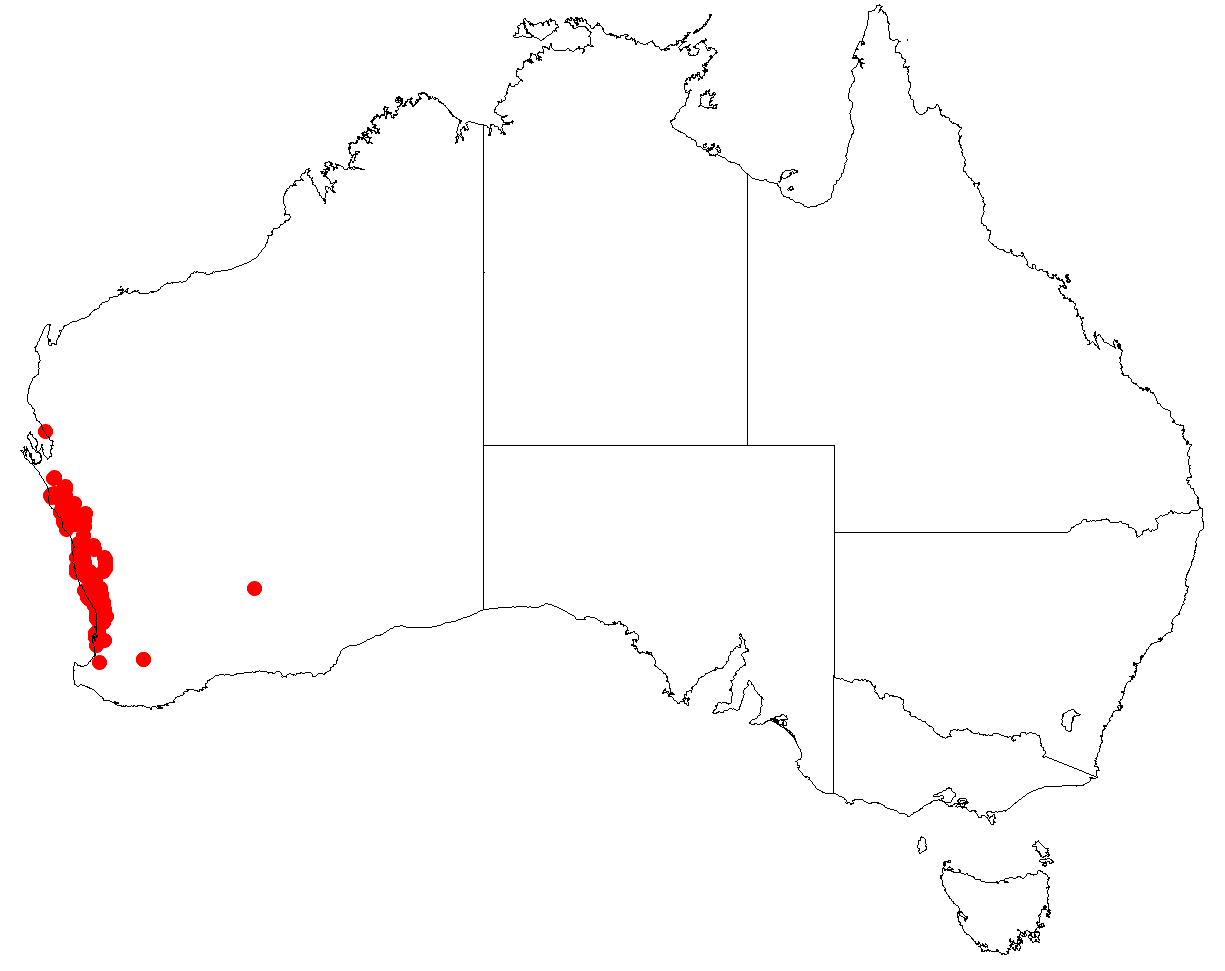
- Occurrence data from AVH

Synonyms
- Dampiera canescens (Benth.) de Vriese; Lobelia canescens (Benth.) Kuntze nom. illeg. Scaevola glaucescens de Vriese; Scaevola trinervia B.D.Jacks. orth. var. Scaevola trinervis de Vriese

= Scaevola canescens =

Species of flowering plant

Scaevola canescens, commonly known as grey scaevola, is a species of flowering plant in the family Goodeniaceae, and is endemic to the west of Western Australia. It is a shrub with woolly hairs, sessile narrowly oblong to lance-shaped leaves, white flowers with brownish veins, and egg-shaped fruit.

== Description ==
Scaevola canescens is a shrub that typically grows to a height of up to 60 cm (24 in), and is covered with woolly hairs, the stems brittle. Its leaves are sessile, narrowly oblong to lance-shaped with the narrower end towards the base, 12–85 mm (0.47–3.35 in) long and 4–15 mm (0.16–0.59 in) wide and covered with simple hairs. The flowers are borne in spikes up to 100 mm (3.9 in) long in leaf axils with concave, egg-shaped bracts 4.0–6.5 mm (0.16–0.26 in) long and bracteoles 2.5–4.0 mm (0.098–0.157 in) long. The sepals are wavy, up to 0.5 mm (0.020 in) long and the petals are white with brownish veins, softly hairy on the outside and bearded inside, the wings up to 0.5 mm (0.020 in) wide. Flowering occurs from March to November, and the fruit is egg-shaped with the narrower end towards the base, 2–4 mm (0.079–0.157 in) long and usually contains a single seed.

== Taxonomy ==
Scaevola canescens was first formally described in 1837 by George Bentham from specimens collected by Charles von Hügel near King Georges Sound. The specific epithet (canescens) means 'becoming somewhat white or hoary', referring to the hairs on the stems and leaves.

== Distribution and habitat ==
This scpecies of Scaevola grows in sand, often with gravel or limestone, in open forest and heath from south of Shark Bay to near Perth, in the Avon Wheatbelt, Geraldton Sandplains, Jarrah Forest, Swan Coastal Plain, and Yalgoo bioregions of western Western Australia.
