= Von Hügel Institute =

English research institute

Coordinates: 52.2129°N 0.1092°E

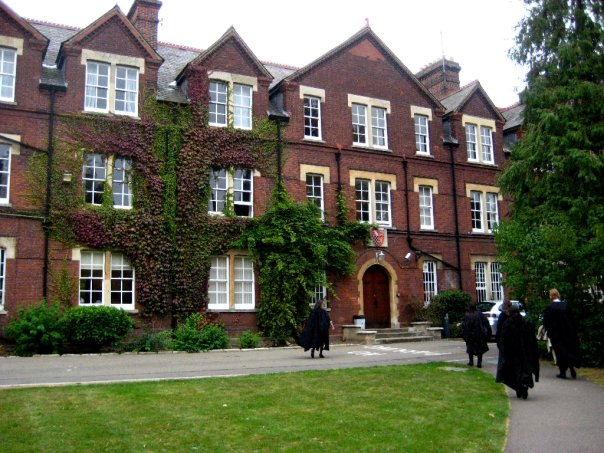
VHI, based at St Edmund's College, Cambridge

The Von Hügel Institute (VHI) is an academic research institute based at St Edmund's College, Cambridge, a constituent part of the University of Cambridge in England.

Founded in 1987, it is named after Anatole von Hügel (1854–1928), naturalist and co-founder (with the Henry Fitzalan-Howard, 15th Duke of Norfolk) of St Edmund's College. It was established, according to the College's Ordinances, to 'preserve and develop the Roman Catholic tradition of the College' by carrying out research on Catholic Social Teaching, on the relationship between Christianity and society, and on issues of social justice.

The institute has been directed by Rev Chris Moss SJ, the Rev Frank McHugh, Rev Frank Carey WF, Professor David Bridges, Rev David Clark, Professor John Loughlin and Dr Philip McCosker.

Professor Mary McAleese, former President of Ireland and Honorary Fellow of St Edmund's is a Patron of the VHI, alongside Professor Rowan Williams, Rt Rev Alan Hopes, and the Countess of St Andrews (Dr Sylvana Tomaselli).

== Director ==
Since January 2020, the Director is Dr Vittorio Montemaggi. who contributed to the programme Dante 2021 on BBC Radio 4 guiding host Katya Adler through the third and final section of the epic poem, the Paradiso.

== Projects ==
In recent years, the VHI has carried out projects on: the relationship between Catholic Social Teaching and the UK Government's 'Big Society' programme; on religious freedom in domestic and international politics; on Intellectual Property questions in the light of Catholic Social Teaching; on illegal trafficking in human organs; and on applying the sustainability and capabilities concepts of Amartya Sen and Martha Nussbaum.

== Other activities ==
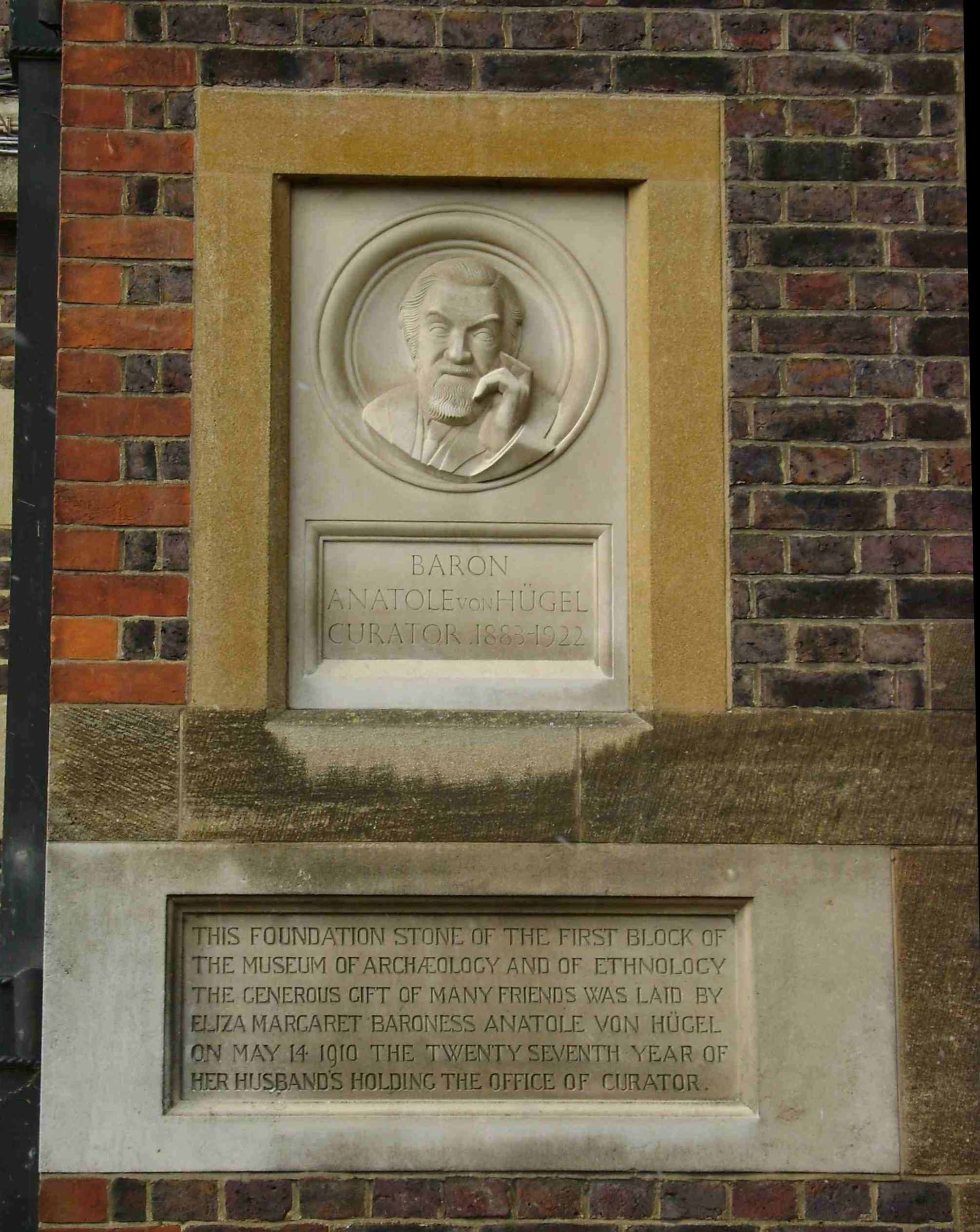
The Institute is named after Anatole von Hügel (1854–1928)

The VHI runs public lectures including the Von Hügel Lecture (delivered in 2012/13 by Professor Stanley Hauerwas, in 2013/14 by the former Irish President Professor Mary McAleese, 2014/15 by Professor Joseph H. H. Weiler, and in 2015/16 by Professor Denys Turner); the Lattey Lecture which examines the links between Catholic Biblical Studies and Catholic Social Teaching (delivered in 2012 by Archbishop Bernard Longley of the Archdiocese of Birmingham, UK and in 2013 by Rev Timothy Radcliffe OP, former Master of the Dominican Order). The theme for 2012-13 lecture series was "Multidisciplinary Perspectives on the Human Person", in 2013-14, "Faith and Governance", in 2014-15, "Ethics and Public Life", and 2015–16, "Mercy".
