= Pauline von Hügel =

Italian-born Austrian-British aristocrat and writer

Baroness Pauline Marie Marguerite Isabelle von Hügel
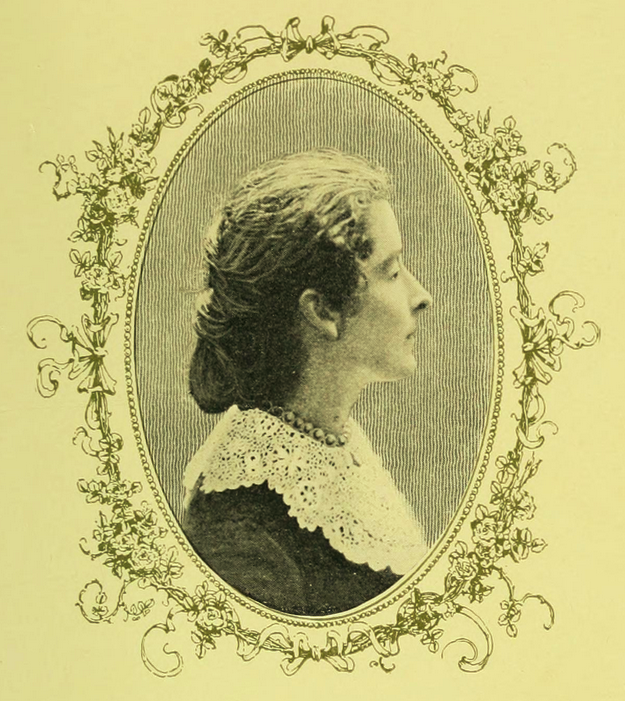
- Born: 3 November 1858; Florence, Grand Duchy of Tuscany
- Died: 29 March 1901 (aged 42); Boscombe, Dorset, England, United Kingdom
- Resting place: St. Benedict's Cemetery, Stratton, England
- Occupation: religious writer
- Parents: Charles von Hügel; Elizabeth Farquharson
- Relatives: Friedrich von Hügel & Anatole von Hügel (brothers)
- Writing career
- Language: English
- Genres: biographies; novels

Signature
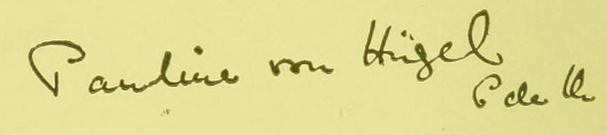

Baroness Pauline Marie Marguerite Isabelle von Hügel (3 November 1858 – 29 March 1901) was an Italian-born Austrian aristocrat and a British religious writer, named after Pauline von Metternich. Born into a life of courtly opulence and high society, Hügel chose to live a charitable and pious life, becoming a benefactress and regarded as the founder of Corpus Christi Church in Boscombe, England. In 1900, bedridden with a long-suffering illness, she continued to write until her death in March 1901, aged 42. Some of her works were published posthumously.

== Early life ==
Baroness Pauline Marie Marguerite Isabelle von Hügel was born at Florence, Italy, 3 November 1858, where her father, Austrian nobleman, army officer and botanist Charles von Hügel was Austrian envoy to the Duke of Tuscany. Her mother was Elizabeth Farquharson (1830-1913), a Scotchwoman and daughter of General Farquharson Charles and Elizabeth met in India in 1833, where her father was serving as a military officer, and the couple become betrothed in 1847. charles was 56 when they married, and Elizabeth, 20. Pauline, her older brother, Friedrich von Hügel, and younger brother, Anatole von Hügel, were all born in Florence.

Around 1860, the father's business required the family to remove to Brussels. Though Pauline's earliest years had been passed in the midst of Courts, where she had been surrounded with all the pleasantries and opportunities available, even as a child, she shrank from worldly things, and far from finding her happiness in them, she felt them a burden, and even despised them.

After his retirement from the diplomatic service, Baron von Hügel settled his family in the country of his wife. When still in Pauline's teens, after her father's death, the mother and daughter removed to England. Pauline's refined beauty -bearing a striking resemblance to the Madonna of Il Sodoma in Rome's Galleria Borghese- and her many accomplishments attracted much attention during the two seasons that she passed in London. After a few weeks of her second and last season in society, she told her mother, "I cannot bear it any longer. Here are you squandering so much money on me for dresses and jewels and entertainments, to bring me into a society with which I have not one idea in common, and which I loathe; and I think of our Lord Jesus Christ, Who became poor for my sake, and worked as a carpenter—and all around us there are so many poor people in misery and want who could be relieved by what I am spending so uselessly. Oh, mother, do take me away and put an end to it." If she had followed her own inclination, she would have joined a religious Order, but she was advised that her duty lay at home with her widowed mother, and she accepted this responsibility.

== Career ==
Pauline remained unmarried and lived a quiet life with her mother and Miss Mary Ellen Redmayne, the mother's school companion and lifelong friend, at Boscombe, Bournemouth, Dorset, in the south of England. There, Pauline was continually active in the service of charity, and especially in the care of the poor. She began writing for The Catholic Fireside, in which appeared short lives of St. Cecilia, St. Benedict, St. Francis, and St. Ignatius, as well as several tales. In 1895, she wrote the Price of the Pearl, published by the Catholic Truth Society; it was a sixpenny volume containing four short stories, three on English Catholic life during the days of the persecution, and one of which the scene is laid in Italy, but the theme is the conversion of a young American girl and her Scotch governess. A sketch of Lady Clare Feilding appeared in the Catholic Magazine. Carmen's Secret came out in the Catholic Magazine, and was republished in book form by the Catholic Truth Society.

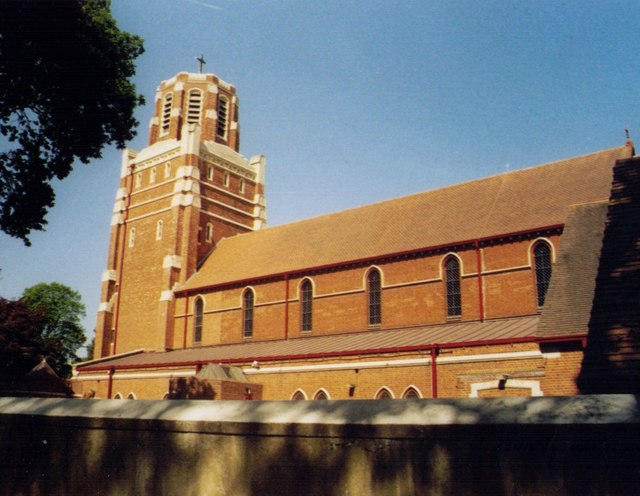
Corpus Christi Church, Boscombe

Hugel is regarded as the founder of Boscombe's, Corpus Christi Church (1896). It was the crowning desire of her life was to build a church in the town where she and her mother lived. This required time and care to arrange, plan, and carry out all the construction details, and of equipping and fitting the church for service. The whole of that work, Hügel did practically alone. During that time, she relaxed nothing of the incessant round of daily minor duties; her choir, her catechisms, her club, her visitation of the poor, a visitation which was not that of a mere benefactress coming to give alms, but of a personal friend intimately acquainted with all the person's wants and trials, and deeply interested in each one of them. All this was done with health already seriously affected by prolonged overstrain. Her name is commemorated on a brass plaque located at the back of the church.

== Death and legacy ==
Hügel lay for months at home in Boscombe with a long-suffering illness. Even on her sick bed, she wrote pious and interesting little books, and condensed the lives of the Saints for popular use. She received the Last Sacraments on 18 December 1900 but lingered till she finally died on 29 March 1901. A benefactress of the Downside Abbey church, Stratton, Pauline was buried beside her mother and her brother, Friedrich, at St. Benedict's Cemetery, in the shadow of the abbey. Redmayne, who died in 1902, is buried alongside Pauline and her mother.

On 29 March 2001, the hundredth anniversary of Pauline's death, a memorial mass was said in her honor at Corpus Christi Church, Boscombe.

== Selected works ==
- One Christmas Night, 1890
- Only a Little Boy, 1890
- Price of the Pearl, 1895
- Fair Dorothy Wilmot, 189?
- A royal son and mother, 1902
- Carmen's Secret, 1903
- The Life of St. Paula

=== Articles in The Catholic Fireside ===
- "The life of St. Cecilia"
- "The life of St. Benedict"
- "The life of St. Francis"
- "The life of St. Ignatius"
