= St Finian's Primary School =

Former school in Belfast, Northern Ireland

Coordinates: 54.599°N 5.946°W

St Finian's Primary School (1901 - 1989) (Irish: Bunscoil Naomh Fionán) was a Roman Catholic primary school located in the Falls Road area of West Belfast near Dunville Park. It was named after Saint Finnian of Clonard and was run by the De La Salle Christian Brothers.

The school was formally known as St Finian's Monastery Public Elementary School, which was the name over the school gate. Until the fifties, pupils would often leave school at 14 years, or even earlier. In the sixties, with the raising of the school-leaving age pupils would usually leave at 11/12 years and proceed to a secondary school or a grammar school elsewhere in the city. Due to falling student numbers the school closed in the 1980s.

Since 2004 the building has been occupied by the Irish-language primary school Gaelscoil an Lonnáin. There is also a Naíscoil an Lonnáin located in the facility for pre-school children. In 2016, the Board of Governors proposed that it relocate to the former site of St Comgall's School in Divis Street but this was not approved.

Nearby, located behind Clonard Monastery, was St Gall's Primary School which was also run by the De La Salle Brothers. The school is now closed but is remembered in the name of the local sports club St Gall's GAC and in the name of the street St Gall's Avenue.

== Notable alumni ==
Former pupils of St. Finian's include:

- James Joseph Magennis (1919 - 1986), who served on midget submarines in WW2, disabled the battle ship Tirpitz and subsequently won the Victoria Cross
- John Loughlin (born 1948), Fellow of St Edmund's College, University of Cambridge and formerly Professor of European Politics at Cardiff University
- Gerry Adams (born 1948), Irish republican politician (president of the Sinn Féin political party, and a Teachta Dála for Louth from 2011 to 2020)
- Martin Dillon (b. 1949) - author
- Gerry Kelly, (born 1953) Irish republican politician and former Provisional Irish Republican Army volunteer, member of Sinn Féin's Ard Chomhairle (National Executive) and MLA for North Belfast

Former pupils of St. Gall's include:

- Ciaran Carson (1948-2019): poet and academic
- Michael McLaverty (1904-1992): author and teacher
