= Pilgrim Cross =

Roman Catholic pilgrimage route in England

Pilgrim Cross (formerly known as Student Cross) is the annual, Ecumenical, cross-carrying, walking pilgrimage to Walsingham that takes place over Holy Week and Easter. It is the longest continuous walking pilgrimage in Britain and is walked by pilgrims of all ages. The pilgrimage was founded in 1948 by a University of London student, Wilfred Mauncote-Carter, who led a group including many ex-servicemen, on a walk from London to Walsingham, taking it in turns to carry the Cross. The pilgrimage has grown over the years and currently consists of 10 different 'legs' that start from different areas of the country and at different stages of the week leading up to the celebration of the Easter Triduum. The original pilgrimage was only open to male Catholics but it quickly expanded to welcome graduates the next year. Women were officially allowed to walk from 1967 and it became all age in 1981 with the addition of a new leg for families. The pilgrimage has been officially Ecumenical since 1972 although it still retains a Catholic flavour.

During the COVID-19 pandemic in 2020 and 2021, the pilgrimage was carried out virtually with online liturgy daily during Holy Week.

== Current Pilgrim Cross legs ==
Five of the legs walk for seven days over a distance of approximately 120 miles. One leg walks for three days over a distance of around sixty miles. Two are for families and are based in Letton Hall, near Shipdham and Wells-next-the-Sea. Easter Cross walks for Good Friday only and is generally for older student-crossers who have previously walked full legs. In 2012, another leg - Wensum Leg - was set up for secondary school-aged children and their parents, to cover the gap between family legs and the 'main' legs. These legs meet on the afternoon of Good Friday and celebrate the Easter liturgy together in Walsingham over the Easter weekend. In 2021, X-Leg was created to reflect the changing online presence of the pilgrimage. This online 'leg' of the pilgrimage was held in 2022.

- London (starts walking from Epping Forest)
- Northern (starts walking from the village of Keyworth near Nottingham)
- Midland (starts walking from the village of Keyham near Leicester)
- Kettering (starts walking from Kettering)
- Essex (starts walking from Colchester)
- Oxford (starts walking from Oxford)
- Ely (starts walking from Ely)
- Peg (based at Letton Hall, Shipdham, Norfolk)
- Wells (based at Wells-next-the-Sea Youth Hostel)
- Easter (starts walking from North Elmham on Good Friday)
- Wensum (starts walking from Wymondham on Palm Sunday)
- X-Leg (Online Leg with option to join the pilgrimage live in Walsingham)
