= Anatole von Hügel =

Austrian anthropologist (1854–1928)

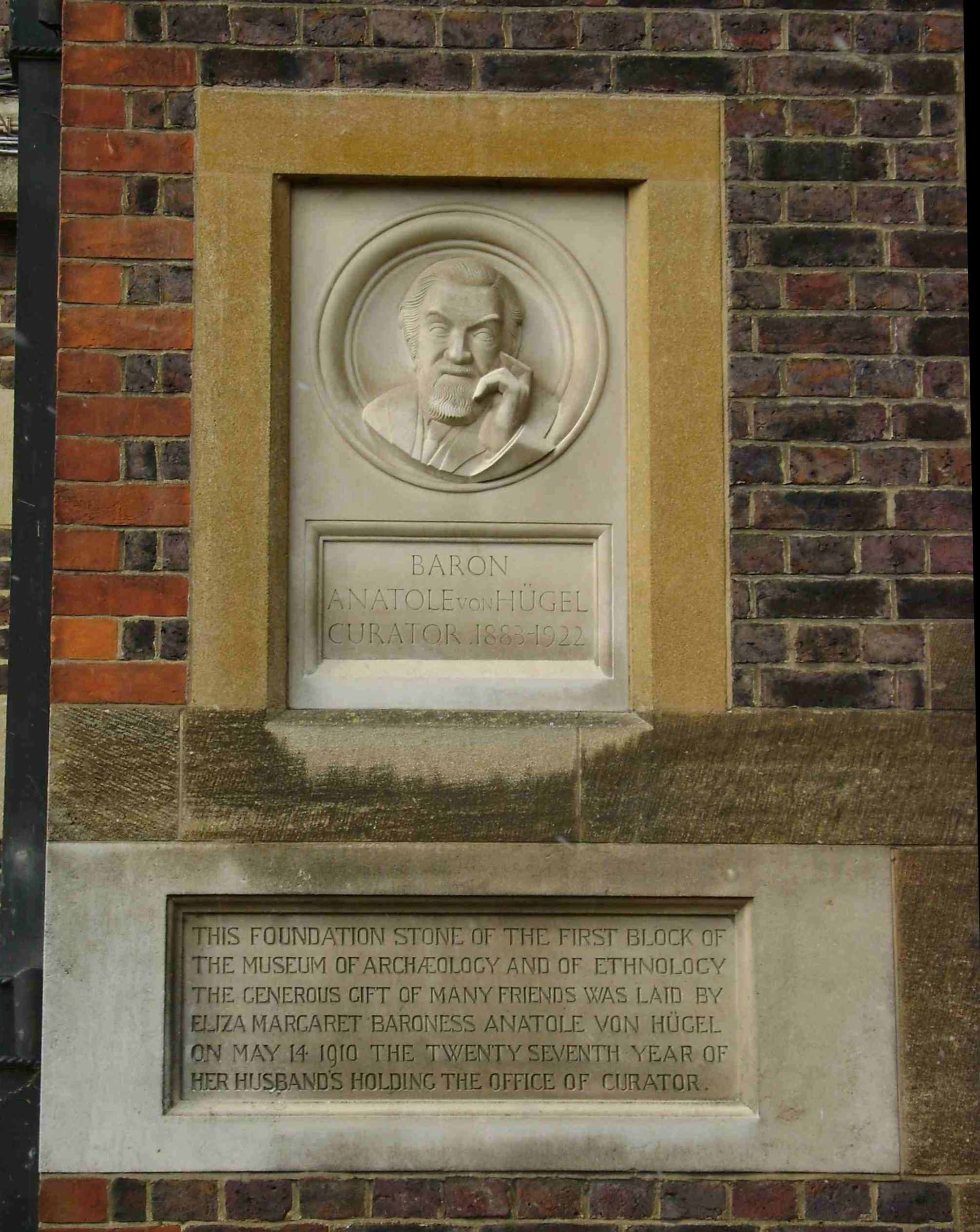
Plaque bearing von Hügel's likeness, Museum of Archaeology and Anthropology, University of Cambridge

Anatole von Hügel (29 September 1854, in Florence – 15 August 1928, in Cambridge) was a son of an Austrian nobleman who lived in England and was curator of the Cambridge University Museum of Archaeology, 1883 – 1921.

== Early life ==
Born into the German noble House of Hügel, he was the second son of Baron Charles von Hügel and his Scottish wife Elizabeth Farquharson. His elder brother was Friedrich von Hügel and his sister was Pauline von Hügel.

== Biography ==
His family moved to England in 1867 after his father's retirement, and he was educated at Stonyhurst College. From 1874 to 1878 he collected natural history specimens in Australia, New Zealand, Fiji, Samoa, and Java. He became an authority on Fiji, after his lengthy travels in the practically unknown interior of Viti Levu to record the original Fijian culture before British colonisation.

In 1880 he married Eliza Margaret Froude, daughter of William Froude and in 1883 he became the first curator of the Museum of Archaeology and Anthropology, University of Cambridge. He remained curator until 1921, raising funds for the new building. In 1889 he was admitted to Trinity College, Cambridge and received an MA. Hügel was founder and first president (1895 to 1922) of the Cambridge University Catholic Association, and was co-founder of St Edmund's College, Cambridge with Henry Fitzalan-Howard, 15th Duke of Norfolk. There is a memorial plaque to Baron Anatole von Hügel on the wall in the St John Fisher chapel of Our Lady and the English Martyrs Church in Cambridge. He was buried in Cambridge Cemetery on 20 August 1928, as was his wife, a member of the Cambridge Ladies Dining Society with 11 other members.

Hügel privately published a biography of his father in 1903.

== See also ==
- Von Hügel Institute
- Cambridge University Catholic Chaplaincy
