= Sonia Mazey =

New Zealand political science academic (born 1958)

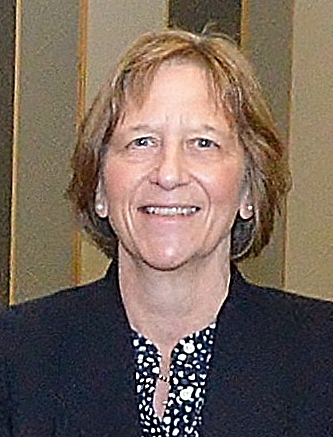
- Mazey in 2018
- Born: 1958 (age 67–68)
- Education: Nuffield College, University of Oxford
- Scientific career
- Fields: Political science
- Workplaces: University of Canterbury
- Thesis: The theory and practice of the 1972 French regional reform 1972-1980, with special reference to Brittany : an example of incremental decision making (1985)
- Doctoral advisor: Vincent Wright

Sonia Mazey (born 1958) is a New Zealand political science academic. She is listed as adjunct Professor of Public Policy at the University of Canterbury (UC) and former Pro-Vice Chancellor, UC business and Law (2012–20).

== Biography ==
Mazey was raised in Oxford, England, and earned her BA (Hons) in Social Sciences from Leicester University in 1979. At University of Oxford in 1985, she was granted her PhD with her dissertation titled 'The theory and practice of the 1972 French regional reform 1972–1980, with special reference to Brittany: an example of incremental decision making', under her supervisor, Vincent Wright. Mazey held senior academic and management positions at Brunel, Cambridge and Oxford Universities.

In 2008, after a family vacation to New Zealand, Mazey relocated, with her husband and two children, to Christchurch, New Zealand and she joined the faculty at the University of Canterbury. She began her tenure at UC as a Lecturer, but she progressed through the university ranks to Academic Manager and Dean before she was named Pro-Vice-Chancellor.

She is a Board Director of the Asia Pacific Student Accommodation Association (APSAA) and former Chair of the Universities New Zealand Vice Chancellors' Sub-Committee for University Student Pastoral Care (CUSPaC).

Mazey's work includes a publication on New Zealand's public policy: Sonia Mazey and Jeremy Richardson (eds), Policy-making under Pressure: Rethinking the Policy process in Aotearoa New Zealand (Canterbury University Press, 2021).

== Selected works ==
Mazey has researched politics and public policy in the European Union.

- Mazey, Sonia, and Jeremy John Richardson, eds. Lobbying in the European community. Oxford University Press, 1993.
- Mazey, Sonia, and Jeremy Richardson. "Interest groups and EU policy-making." European Union: Power and Policy-Making, Nueva York, Routledge (2006): 247–265.
- Mazey, Sonia. "The European Union and women's rights: from the Europeanization of national agendas to the nationalization of a European agenda?." Journal of European Public Policy 5, no. 1 (1998): 131–152.
- Mazey, Sonia. "Introduction: Integrating gender-intellectual and 'real world' mainstreaming." (2000): 333–345.
- Mazey, Sonia, and Jeremy Richardson. "The Commission and the lobby." The European Commission (1994): 169–201.
