= Walsingham =

Civil parish in Norfolk, England

Coordinates: 52.894°N 0.874°E

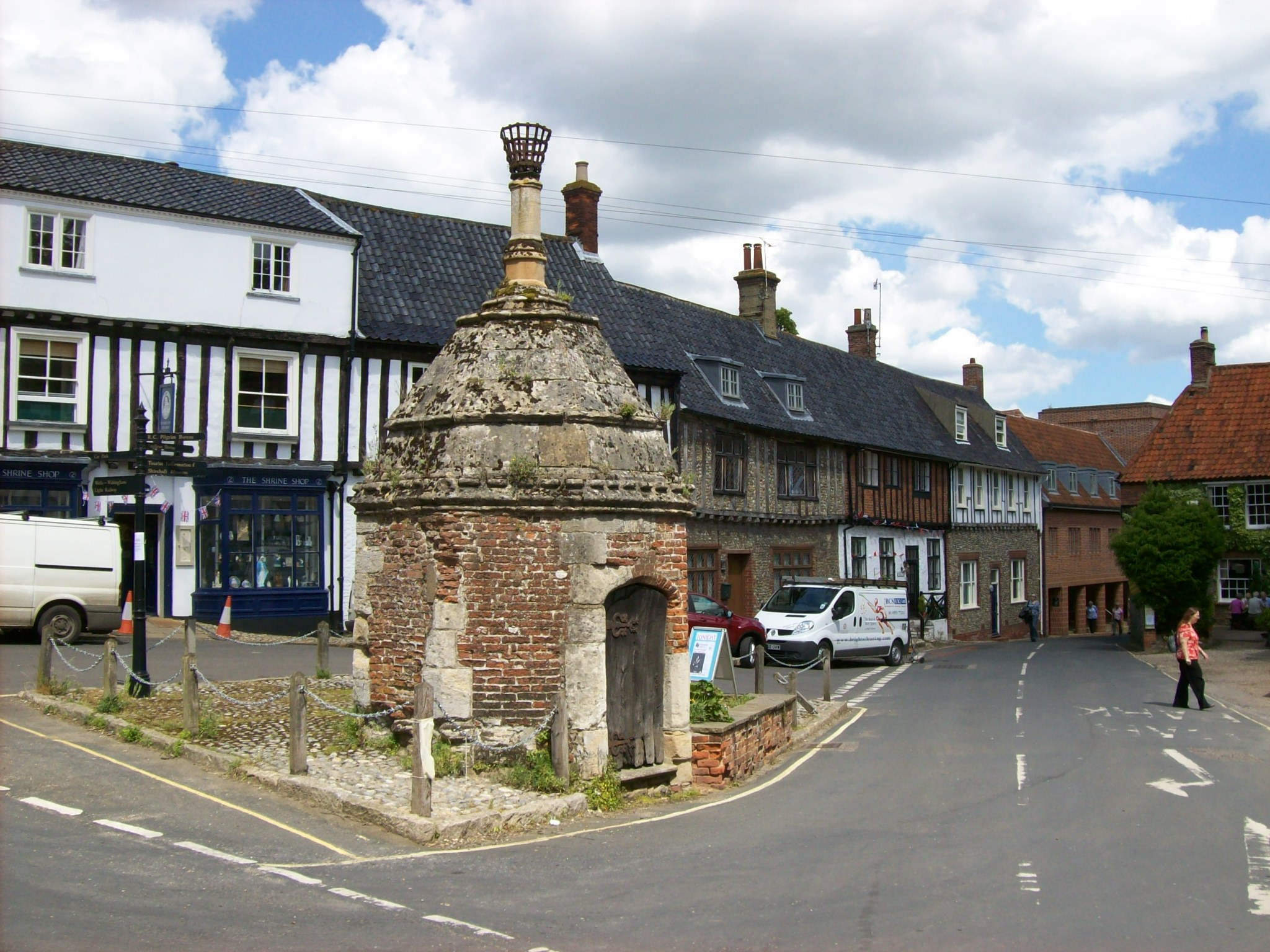
- Common Place, Little Walsingham

- Location within Norfolk
- Area: 18.98 km^{2} (7.33 sq mi)
- Population: 819 (2011)
  - Density: 43/km^{2} (110/sq mi)
- OS grid reference: TF934368
  - London: 118 miles
- Civil parish: Walsingham
- District: North Norfolk
- Shire county: Norfolk
- Region: East
- Country: England
- Sovereign state: United Kingdom
- Post town: WALSINGHAM
- Postcode district: NR22
- Dialling code: 01328
- Police: Norfolk
- Fire: Norfolk
- Ambulance: East of England
- UK Parliament: Broadland and Fakenham

Walsingham is a civil parish in the North Norfolk district, in Norfolk, England, notable for its religious shrines in honour of Mary, mother of Jesus. The parish also contains the ruins of two medieval monastic houses. Walsingham lies 27 miles (43 kilometres) northwest of Norwich and approximately 26 miles (42 kilometres) north-east of King's Lynn.

The civil parish includes Little Walsingham and Great Walsingham, together with Egmere, a depopulated medieval village. It has an area of 18.98 square kilometres (7.33 square miles). At the 2011 census, it had a population of 819.

Walsingham is a historically significant Christian pilgrimage site, renowned for its devotion to Our Lady of Walsingham. According to tradition, in 1061, the Anglo-Saxon noblewoman Lady Richeldis de Faverches experienced a Marian vision in which the Virgin Mary commissioned her to build a replica of the Holy Family's house in Nazareth in commemoration of the Annunciation. The Holy House in Walsingham, first constructed in the 11th century, was paneled with wood and housed a wooden statue of the enthroned Virgin Mary holding the child Jesus on her lap. Among its relics was a phial reputed to contain the Virgin's milk. Walsingham became one of England's most prominent pilgrimage sites, thriving throughout the Middle Ages as a centre of Marian devotion until the English Reformation in 1538, when the shrine was dismantled. After centuries of decline, pilgrimage to Walsingham saw a revival in the late 19th and early 20th centuries, particularly with the restoration of the Catholic and Anglican shrines in the 20th century.

== History ==
Walsingham is mentioned several times in the Domesday Book of 1086. It is recorded as Walsingham (Walsingaham) and “another Walsingham” (alia Walsingaham), which Martin interprets as the current villages of Great and Little Walsingham, held by Reginald fitzIvo, of 19, and 24 households, and valued at £6, and 100s (£5), respectively; a Great Walsingham (Walsingaham magna) held by Peter de Valognes, of 7 households and valued at 40s; and a Walsingham (Galsingaham) listed as a berewick of the King's manor of Fakenham, of 11 households, all in the hundred of North Greenhoe.

== Priory ==
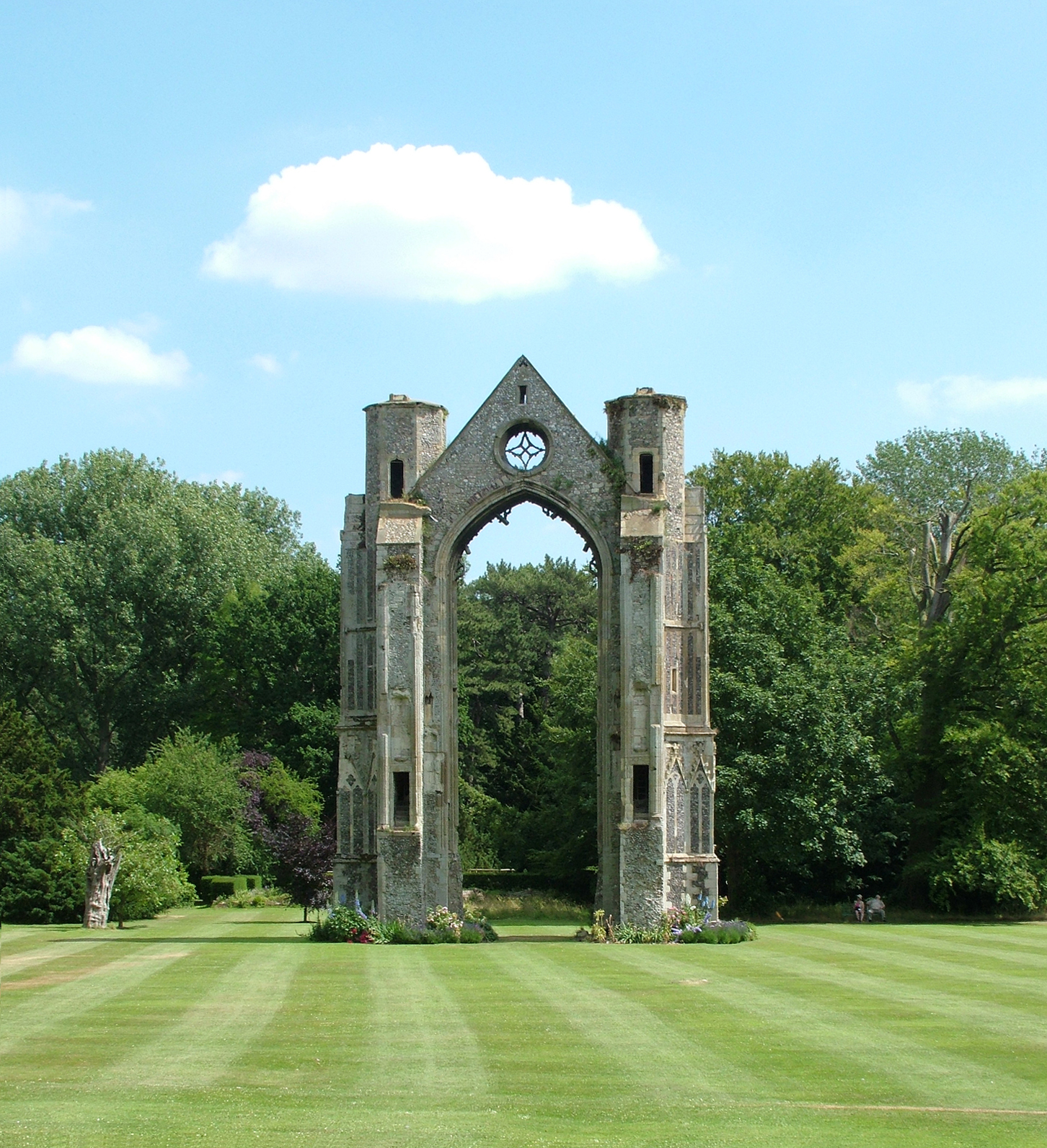
Fragmentary remains of Walsingham Priory

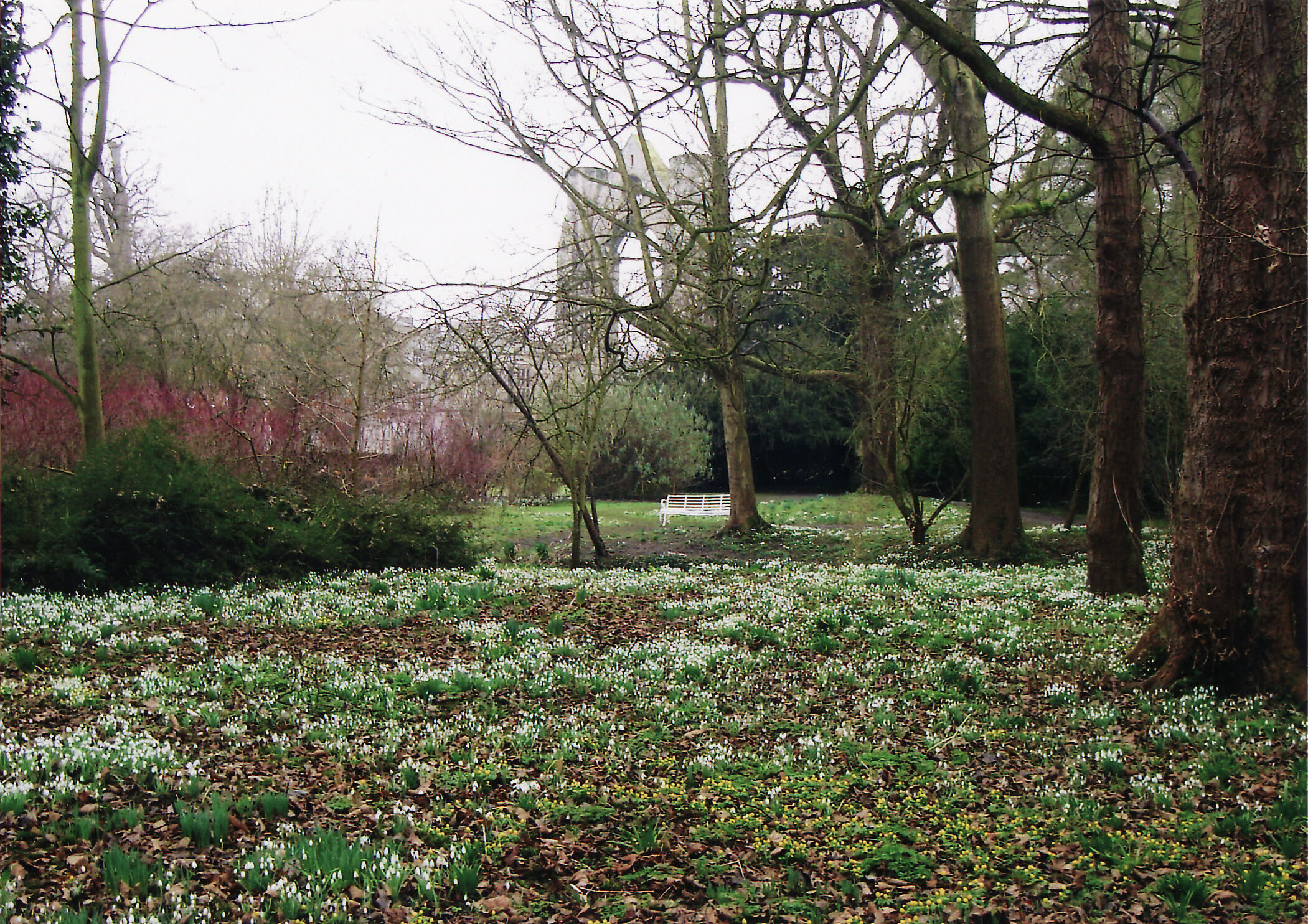
Snowdrops and winter aconite in the priory gardens

The Augustinian Priory of the Annunciation of the Blessed Virgin Mary was established in Walsingham around 1153, funded by Geoffrey de Faverches, son of Lady Richeldis, who had originally founded the Holy House shrine. The priory became a major centre of pilgrimage, growing in prominence throughout the medieval period.

The Anglo-Saxon Chapel and the Holy House, originally founded during the reign of Edward the Confessor, was granted to the Augustinians Canons a century later and incorporated into the priory complex, further reinforcing Walsingham's status as a focal point of religious devotion, particularly in Marian pilgrimage.

Pilgrims from across the British Isles and continental Europe, including members of royalty, travelled to Walsingham, which remained one of the most significant pilgrimage sites until the Dissolution of the Monasteries under King Henry VIII in 1538, leading to the destruction of the priory. To this day, the main pilgrimage route through Newmarket, Brandon, and Fakenham, remains known as the Palmers' Way, a historic path followed by pilgrims for centuries.

In 1537 while the last Prior, Richard Vowell, was paying obsequious respect to Thomas Cromwell, the Sub-Prior, Nicholas Mileham, was charged with conspiring to rebel against the suppression of the lesser monasteries and, on flimsy evidence, was convicted of high treason and hanged outside the Priory walls. Eleven people in all, including two lay choristers who had been instrumental in organising the revolt were hanged, drawn, and quartered.

In July, Prior Vowell assented to the destruction of Walsingham Priory and assisted the king's commissioners in the removal of the figure of Our Lady and many of the gold and silver ornaments and the general spoliation of the shrine. For his ready compliance the Prior received a pension of 100 pounds a year, a large sum in those days, while 15 of the canons received pensions varying from four to six pounds. Following the dismantling of the shrine and the destruction of the priory, the site was sold by order of Henry VIII to Thomas Sidney for 90 pounds. Over the late 17th and early 19th centuries, the Prior's lodging underwent successive expansions, eventually transforming into a private residence known as 'The Abbey'. The gold and silver from the shrine were transported to London, along with the statue of Our Lady of Walsingham, which was said to have been burned.

The fall of the monastery gave rise to the anonymous Elizabethan ballad, The Walsingham Lament, on what the Norfolk people felt at the loss of their Shrine of Our Lady of Walsingham. The ballad includes the lines:

Weep, weep, O Walsingham,
Whose days are nights,
Blessings turned to blasphemies,
Holy deeds to despites.

Sin is where our Ladye sat,
Heaven turned is to hell;
Satan sits where Our Lord did sway,
Walsingham, O farewell!

== 20th century revival ==
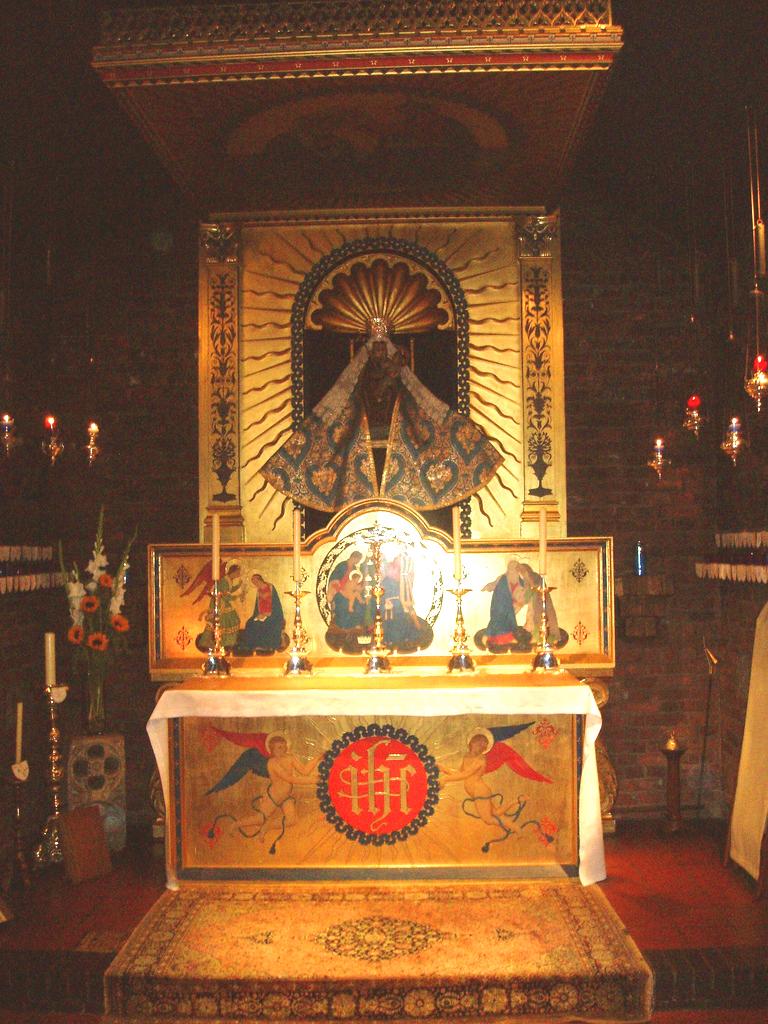
Anglican Shrine of Our Lady of Walsingham

By a rescript of 6 February 1897, Pope Leo XIII blessed a new statue for the restored ancient sanctuary of Our Lady of Walsingham. This was sent from Rome and placed in the Lady Chapel at the newly built Roman Catholic parish church of King's Lynn (the village of Walsingham was within the parish) on 19 August 1897 and on the following day the first post-Reformation pilgrimage took place to the Slipper Chapel at Walsingham, which was purchased by Charlotte Boyd(e) in 1895 and restored for Catholic devotion. Hundreds of Catholics attended the pilgrimage and committed themselves to an annual pilgrimage (from 1897 to 1934 on Whitsun) to commemorate this event. The Guild of Our Lady of Ransom was instrumental in the revival of the Walsingham pilgrimage, as the Guild's leader Father Fletcher had experience in organising large-scale pilgrimages of this kind all over England and Wales. Archives are kept at King's Lynn and Walsingham.

In 1900, a caretaker was placed in the Priest's House at the Slipper Chapel (said to have been built in 1338); to facilitate its use by Catholic pilgrims, under the custody of the monks at Downside Abbey. Both Father Wrigglesworth (the Catholic parish priest of King's Lynn and Walsingham) and Father Fletcher (Founder and Master of the Guild of Ransom) laid the foundations and left others to declare the Catholic National Shrine at the Slipper Chapel on 19 August 1934 with over 10,000 pilgrims present. Attempts to purchase the abbey site were unsuccessful (even though one of the Lee-Warners, who owned the estate, became a Catholic in 1899); however, in 1961 the site of the original Holy House within the priory ruins was excavated by members of the Royal Archaeological Institute.

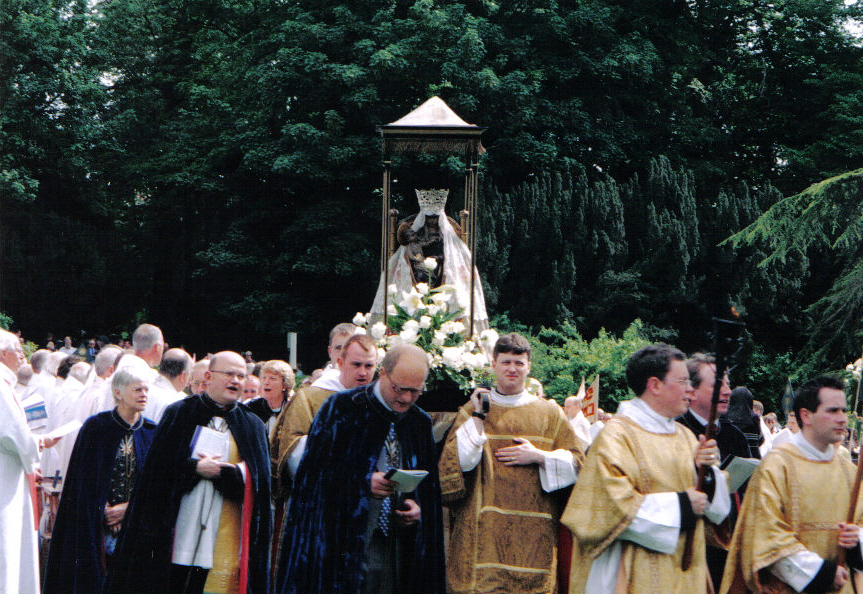
Anglican National Pilgrimage procession in the grounds of the ruined abbey, May 2003

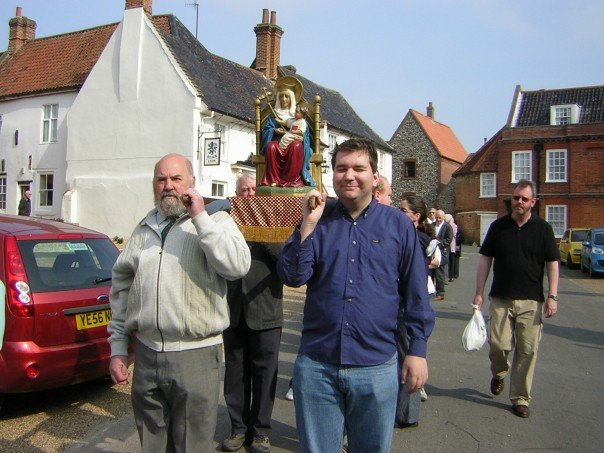
The Catholic Association procession to Walsingham, May 2007

As a result of the initiative of the Anglican vicar of Walsingham (from 1921), Father Alfred Hope Patten, an Anglican Marian shrine has been established in Walsingham. First established in the parish church of St Mary and All Saints in 1922, the image of Our Lady was translated to a purpose-built building in 1931 and pilgrimages are now held through the summer months.

The Anglican National Pilgrimage takes place on the Late Spring Bank Holiday (the last Monday in May) and is regularly met by Protestant picket lines. The Student Cross pilgrimage on Good Friday visits both the Anglican and Catholic shrines and the National Youth Pilgrimage is in the first week of August, also visiting the Anglican shrine.

The Catholic shrine continues to be based at the Slipper Chapel, near the hamlet of Houghton St Giles. Many significant occasions have been celebrated here, including the Pilgrimage of Catholic Youth (1938), the Cross Carrying Pilgrimages (since 1948), and the Crowning of Our Lady (Marian year 1954 and 1988). On 22 May 1982, the statue of Our Lady of Walsingham was taken to Pope John Paul II at the Wembley Mass and given a place of honour during his British visit. In 2000, a new Feast of Our Lady of Walsingham was approved by the hierarchy, to be celebrated in England and Wales on 24 September.

Ecumenical opportunities have been seen in Walsingham, and there is an interaction between the two shrines. In the Anglican shrine, there has long been established a small Orthodox chapel. The Orthodox have furthered their presence at the Church of the Holy Transfiguration, formerly the Methodist chapel at Great Walsingham, and also at the former Walsingham railway station which has been converted into the church of St Seraphim.

Little Sisters of Jesus has had a community of sisters in Little Walsingham since the late 1960s. There is currently also a community of Carmelites in the village.

== List of Christian sites ==
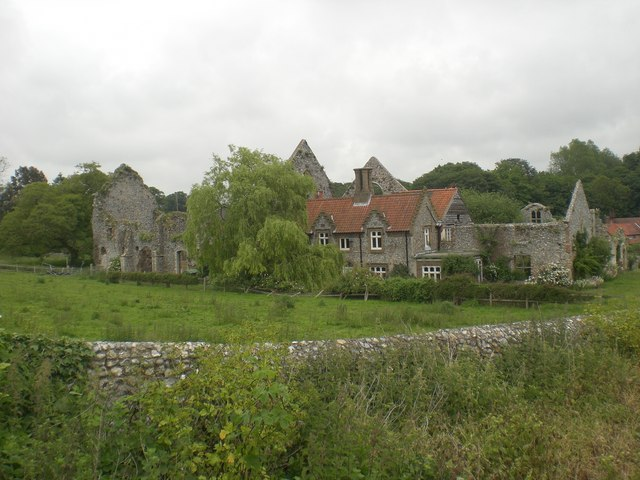
The remains of the Greyfriars, at the south end of the village

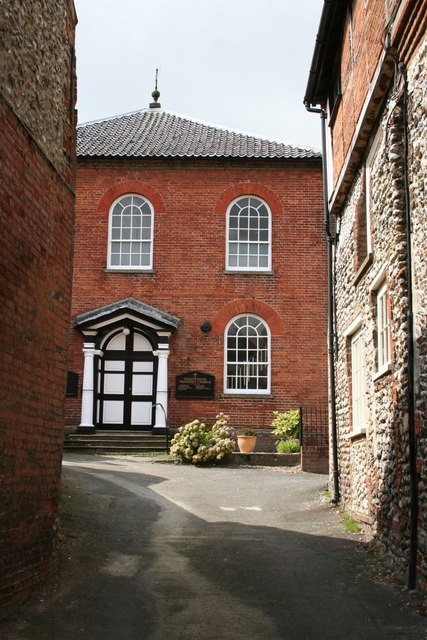
The Methodist Church, just off Friday Market, was built in 1794

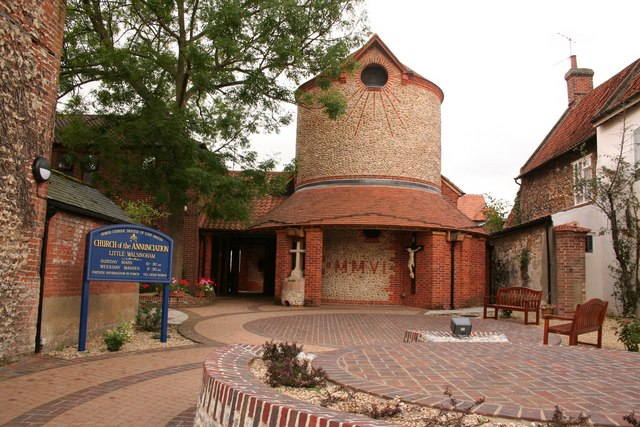
The Church of the Annunciation, re-built in 2006, also just off Friday Market

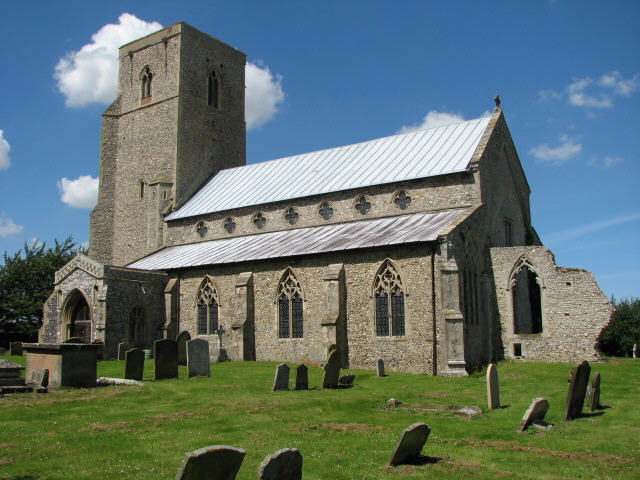
St Peter's in Great Walsingham

=== Little Walsingham ===
==== Shrine ====
- Anglican Shrine of Our Lady of Walsingham (Church of England)
  - The Chantry Chapel of Saint Michael and the Holy Souls (Guild of All Souls)
  - Chapel of the Life-Giving Spring of the Mother of God (Russian Orthodox)

==== Churches ====
- St Mary and All Saints (Church of England parish church)
- Church of the Annunciation (Roman Catholic parish church)
- Walsingham Methodist Chapel
- Church of St Seraphim (Russian Orthodox church); it occupies the unaltered Victorian Walsingham station building, which closed in 1964.

==== Monastic ruins ====
- Walsingham Priory (St Mary's Priory, or ...Abbey) Augustinian (Canons Regular) - open to the public (fee)
- St Mary's Friary (Franciscan; the 'Greyfriars')

=== Great Walsingham ===
==== Churches ====
- St Peter (Church of England parish church)
- The Holy Transfiguration (Russian Orthodox parish church)
- The Church of Our Lady of the Annunciation (Roman Catholic parish church)

==== Church ruin ====
- All Saints and St Mary (former parish church)

=== Houghton ===
==== Shrine ====
- Basilica of Our Lady of Walsingham (the "Slipper Chapel") (Roman Catholic National Shrine)
  - Chapel of Reconciliation (Roman Catholic)

==== Church ====
- St Giles (Church of England parish church)

=== Egmere ===
==== Church ruin ====
- St Edmund (former parish church)

=== Nearby ===
==== Binham ====
- Binham Priory, a Benedictine priory, now in ruins. (4 miles (6.4 km) to the northeast)

==== King's Lynn ====
- Our Lady of the Annunciation, Roman Catholic parish church, national shrine until 1934 (25 miles (40 km) to the southwest)

== Geography ==
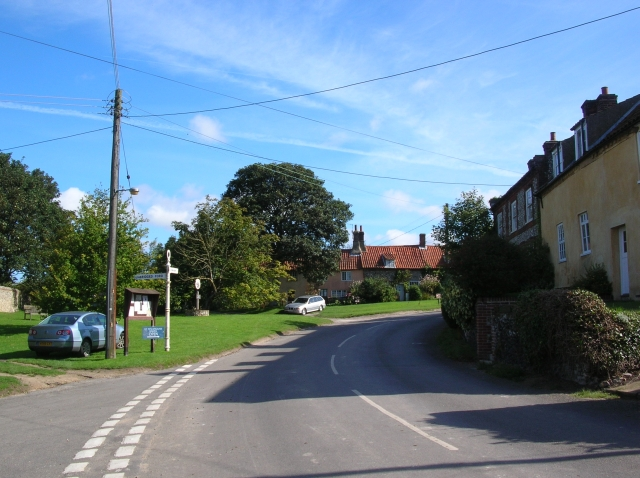
Great Walsingham, which is actually the smaller settlement

The village is the result of a conjoining of two ancient settlements, Great Walsingham and Little Walsingham.

A 19th-century gazetteer describes Little Walsingham as a small town, known simply as Walsingham and which had also been known as New Walsingham, and Great Walsingham as a smaller, separate village which had also been known as Old Walsingham. A market once held on Tuesdays had already become defunct by 1845, whilst the Friday market was already "small" in 1845 and had ceased by 1883.

The River Stiffkey flows through the parish, from south to north, passing to the east of the bulk of the village. The centre of Little Walsingham is at an elevation of around 17 metres (56 ft) and lies within the Stiffkey Valley, with the land rising to the east and west — to the west it rises to around 75 metres (246 ft) at Egmere. National Cycle Route 1 passes through the village.

The former North Creake airfield lies within the parish, just north of Egmere, together with the area known as Bunker's Hill, which is a commercial/industrial area following the disuse as an airfield.

== Governance ==
There is a parish council, which meets at the Village Hall. The parish is divided into Great and Little wards, which reflect the two former civil parishes that merged in 1987.

A ward exists, to elect a councillor to North Norfolk District Council (one of 40), called Walsingham. The current councillor is Tom FitzPatrick, with the most recent election in 2019.

The ward had a population of 2,167 in 2011. Since 2019 boundary changes, the ward comprises the parishes of Barsham, Great Snoring, Little Snoring, Sculthorpe and Walsingham.

From 1894 to 1974 Walsingham Rural District existed, though its council was based in Fakenham.

The Shirehall on Common Place served as a courtroom until 1974. In present times the building is open as a museum, and belongs to the Walsingham Estate. The village has another museum building: the former House of Correction, or The Bridewell.

Egmere and Quarles were merged into the civil parish of Great Walsingham in 1935, but Quarles then transferred to Holkham in 1947.

In ecclesiastic respects, Walsingham falls within the Diocese of Norwich, or the Catholic Diocese of East Anglia.

== Transport ==
=== Wells and Walsingham Light Railway ===
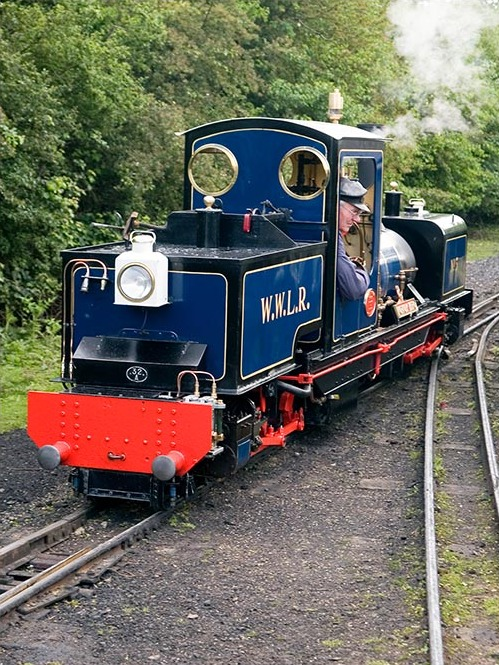
Norfolk Hero on the Wells and Walsingham Light Railway

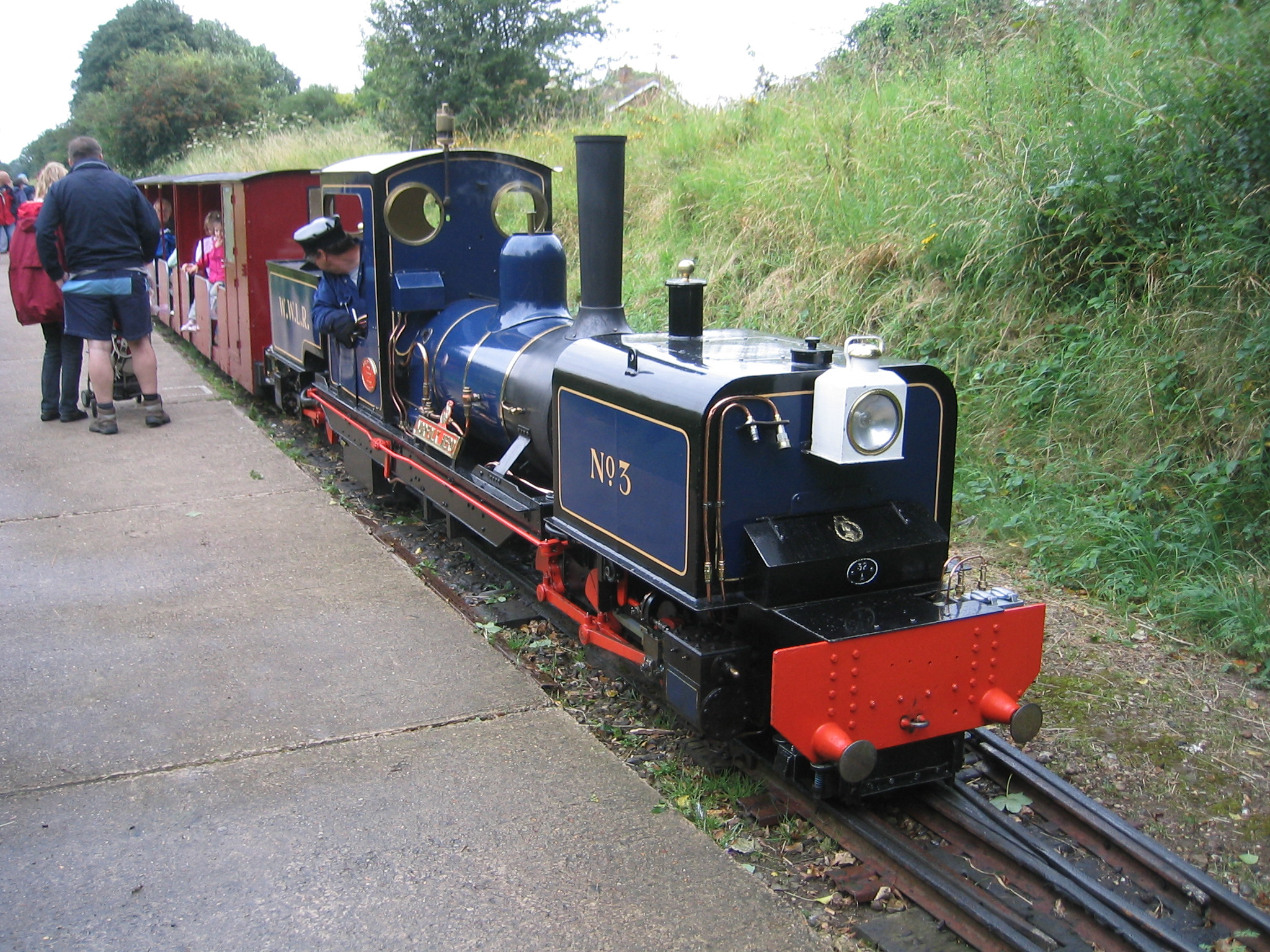
The train from Wells arrives at Walsingham station

Walsingham used to be connected to the national railway network, being on the Wymondham to Wells Branch line, but this was closed during the Beeching Axe in stages from 1964 to 1969.

In 1979 work began on constructing a 10 1/4 in (260 mm) gauge heritage railway on the old track bed to Wells. The line re-opened in 1982 and now operates with a fleet of steam and diesel scale locomotives.

A new station was constructed in Walsingham. The Walsingham railway station building (with the platform still intact and visible) is now Saint Seraphim's Orthodox church.

=== Public transport ===
A regular bus service is provided as Walsingham is on the Coastliner bus route (service number 36) with destinations including Fakenham, Wells, Hunstanton and King's Lynn.

== Other places named Walsingham ==
- Walsingham, Ontario, Canada
- Walsingham, Canterbury, New Zealand
- Walsingham and Walsingham Bay in Hamilton, Bermuda
- Walsingham House School, South Bombay, India.

== See also ==
- Religion in the United Kingdom
- Personal Ordinariate of Our Lady of Walsingham
