= Our Lady of the Annunciation Church, King's Lynn =

Our Lady of the Annunciation Church
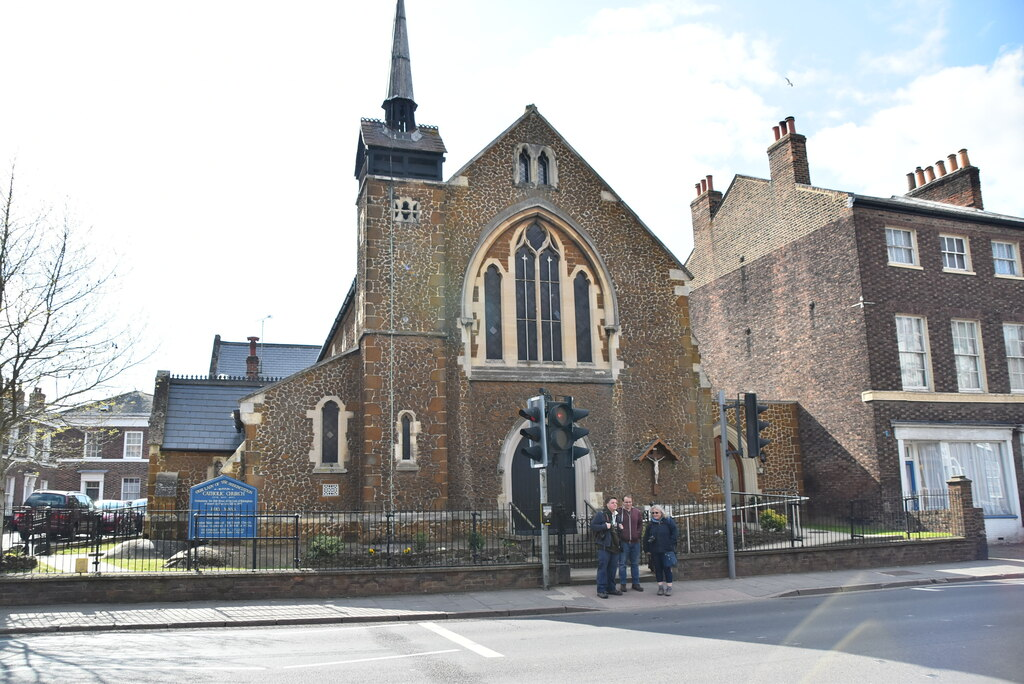
- Our Lady of the Annunciation Church
- 52.7482°N 0.4023°E
- OS grid reference: TF 62223 19428
- Location: King's Lynn
- Country: England
- Denomination: Roman Catholic
- Website: Official website

History
- Status: Active
- Founded: 10 May 1844
- Dedication: Our Lady of the Annunciation
- Consecrated: 8 May 1845

Architecture
- Functional status: Parish church
- Heritage designation: Grade II
- Designated: 7 November 2022
- Architect(s): Augustus Pugin; J. William Lunn
- Style: Gothic Revival
- Groundbreaking: 29 September 1896
- Completed: 2 June 1897
- Construction cost: £3,000

Administration
- Province: Westminster
- Diocese: East Anglia
- Deanery: St Wilfrid's
- Parish: King's Lynn

Our Lady of the Annunciation Church is a Roman Catholic parish church in King's Lynn, Norfolk, England. It was built in 1897, but incorporates parts of the former church on the same site that was built in 1845 and designed by Augustus Pugin. It is located on the corner of London Road and North Everard Street in the centre of the town. Its construction was partially paid for by the then Prince of Wales, Edward VII. It was also the national shrine of Our Lady of Walsingham until 1934. It is now a pontifical shrine, and was awarded Grade II listed status in 2022.

== History ==
=== First church ===
In 1802, a mission was started in King's Lynn by a French priest, Fr le Goff. He was succeeded by another French priest, Fr Dacheux. In 1822, a chapel was built in Coronation Square. In 1839, six acres of land was bought on London Road for a new church. The priest who commissioned the church was Fr John Dalton. He paid Augustus Pugin to design the church. On 10 May 1844, the foundation stone of the church was laid. On 8 May 1845, the church was consecrated by Bishop William Wareing, the Vicar Apostolic of the Eastern District and later the first Bishop of Northampton. There were plans to build a tower and spire, but they were never built. When it was opened the church only had a nave and a chancel. The north aisle was added later. The capacity of the church was 200 people and it came to a total cost of £1,500. In 1849, a presbytery was built next door.

=== Current church ===
By the end of the 19th century, the church was in very poor condition. Its foundations were not solid and cracks were appearing. The priest at the time was Fr George Wrigglesworth. He received complaints from the then Prince of Wales, the future Edward VII, that the church was in such a bad state that Catholic guests at Sandringham House were being inconvenienced when they came to the church for Mass, so the Prince of Wales paid the architect J. William Lunn to report on the state of the church. Lunn had designed other Catholic churches such as St Edmund's Church, Southampton, Corpus Christi Church, Boscombe, Corpus Christi Church in Portsmouth and St Catherine's Church in Chipping Campden. Lunn reported that the church was damaged so much that it could not be repaired. The church was then rebuilt, and designed by Lunn who saved some pieces from the old church such as the rood, font, and the stained glass and reused them. On 29 September 1896, the foundation stone was laid. On 2 June 1897, the church was opened by Arthur Riddell, the Bishop of Northampton. The builder was W. Hubbard of East Dereham and the total cost of the new church was £3,000, of which the Prince of Wales contributed 50 guineas.

=== Shrine ===
In 1896, at Walsingham, Charlotte Pearson Boyd bought the Slipper Chapel, which is now the Basilica of Our Lady of Walsingham, and restored it. Before the opening of Our Lady of the Annunciation Church, Fr Wrigglesworth visited Loreto and saw the Basilica della Santa Casa. In 1897, Our Lady of the Annunciation Church in King's Lynn opened and included a Lady Chapel that was built as a replica of the Holy House within the Basilica della Santa Casa. The same year, Pope Leo XIII officially established the shrine inside the Lady Chapel as the shrine to Our Lady of Walsingham. The pope blessed a statue of the Mary, a replica of the one in Santa Maria in Cosmedin and crafted in Oberammergau, and it was put in the Lady Chapel in the church. It arrived on 19 August 1897 and was processed from the train station to the church. The following day, on 20 August 1897, the first public pilgrimage to Walsingham, since the Reformation, was done by a group of 40–50 people. It was from the church in King's Lynn to the Slipper Chapel in Walsingham. On 15 May 1900, the altar in the shrine was consecrated by Bishop Riddell. It was designed by Joseph Aloysius Pippet. In 1934, the Slipper Chapel in Walsingham became the national shrine to Our Lady of Walsingham, and the shrine in Our Lady of the Annunciation Church became a pontifical shrine.

Historic England listed the church at Grade II on 7 November 2022. This status is given to "nationally important buildings of special interest".

== Parish ==
Our Lady of the Annunciation Church is in the same parish as Holy Family Church in King's Lynn. Both churches have two Sunday masses, Our Lady of the Annunciation Church at 6:00pm on Saturday and at 11:00am on Sunday, and Holy Family Church a mass of the Syro-Malabar Church at 4:30pm on Saturday, and at 9:30am on Sunday.
