= Basilica of Our Lady of Walsingham =

Catholic basilica in Norfolk, England

- "Chapel of Saint Catherine of Alexandria"
- "The Slipper Chapel"
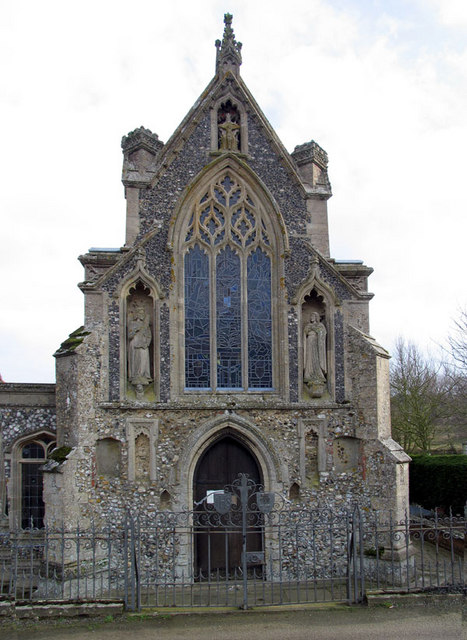
- Front entrance of the 14th-century Slipper Chapel

- Location within Norfolk
- 52°52′52″N 0°51′12″E
- Location: Houghton Saint Giles
- Country: England
- Denomination: Catholic Church
- Sui iuris church: Latin Church
- Website: walsingham.org.uk

History
- Status: Active
- Founded: 1340

Architecture
- Functional status: National Shrine
- Heritage designation: Grade I listed
- Designated: 6 March 1959
- Architect: Thomas Garner
- Style: Gothic Romanesque

Clergy
- Bishop: Peter Collins
- Rector: Robert Billing

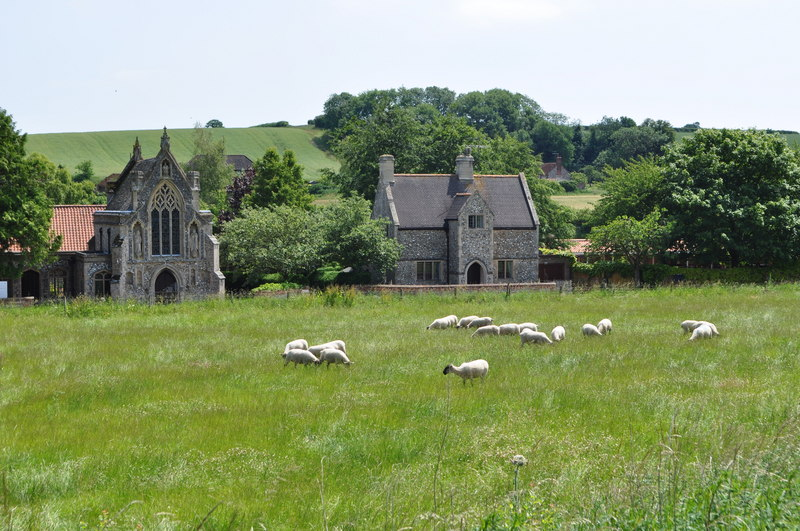
The Slipper Chapel and Presbytery

The Catholic National Shrine and Basilica of Our Lady, at Walsingham, is actually located one mile outside Walsingham, at Houghton Saint Giles, Norfolk, England. It incorporates both the historic Slipper Chapel built around 1340, and the more contemporary Chapel of Our Lady of Reconciliation completed in 1982, and its surrounding grounds. The Slipper Chapel, originally known as the Chapel of Saint Catherine of Alexandria, was the last chapel on the pilgrim route to the Priory of Our Lady of Walsingham. The entire site was elevated to the special status of a Minor Basilica by Pope Francis in 2015.

In 1934, the venerated Marian image of Our Lady of Walsingham was translated from the Our Lady of the Annunciation Church in King's Lynn to the Chapel of Saint Catherine of Alexandria (Slipper Chapel), which has served as a Catholic National Shrine and a focal point of Marian devotion since that year. On 15 August 1954, Pope Pius XII granted a canonical coronation to the venerated image of the Blessed Virgin Mary under the title of Our Lady of Walsingham, which remains enshrined within the Slipper Chapel and continues to be a site of Marian pilgrimage.

== Early history ==
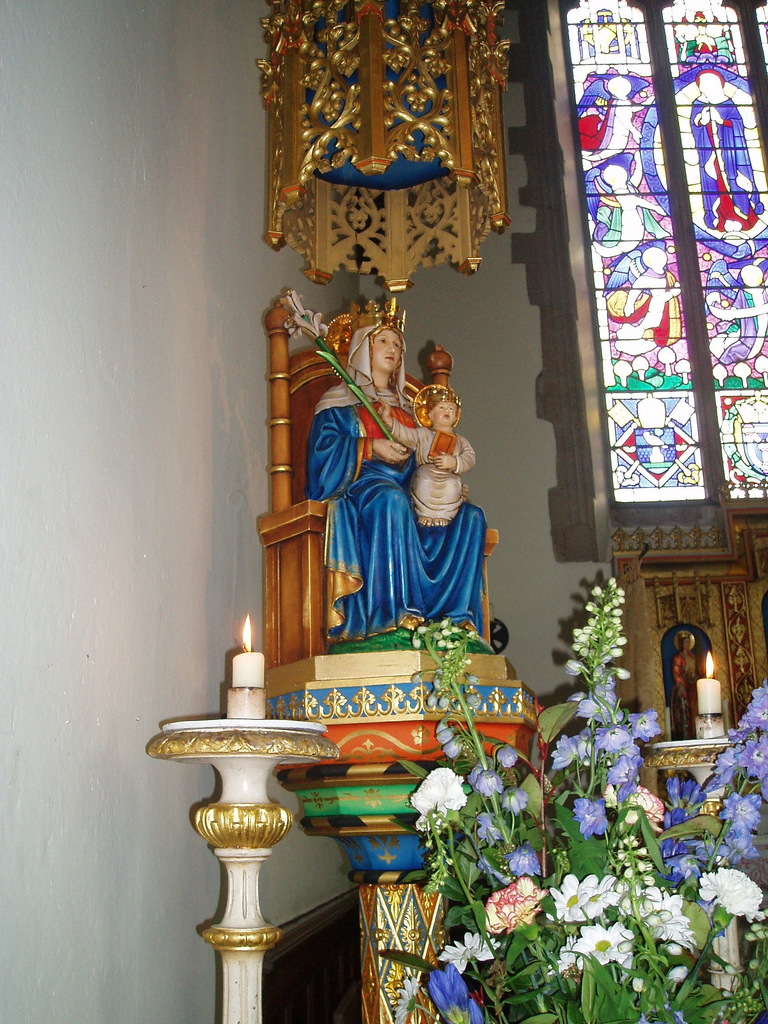
Statue of Our Lady of Walsingham, translated in 1934 from the Our Lady of the Annunciation Church in King's Lynn to the Chapel of Saint Catherine of Alexandria (Slipper Chapel) in Houghton Saint Giles

When the Chapel of Saint Catherine of Alexandria (Slipper Chapel) was built, Walsingham was second only to Canterbury in importance as an English pilgrimage site, attracting pilgrims from across the country and beyond.

In 1538, following King Henry VIII's English Reformation, the chapel fell into disuse and was repurposed over the centuries as a poorhouse, a forge, a cowshed, and a barn. In 1863, Charlotte Pearson Boyd (1837–1906), a wealthy local woman and convert to Catholicism from Anglicanism, identified the chapel. She purchased the building from the farm owner in 1896, restored it, and then donated the chapel to Downside Abbey for Catholic devotion. The chapel underwent further restoration in 1904 under the direction of architect Thomas Garner.

On 6 February 1897, the Our Lady of the Annunciation Church in King's Lynn was re-established as the Pontifical Shrine of Our Lady of Walsingham, authorising the image for public veneration by papal rescript from Pope Leo XIII. In 1934, the image was subsequently translated to the Chapel of Saint Catherine of Alexandria (Slipper Chapel) in Houghton Saint Giles, near Walsingham.

On the Feast of the Assumption, 15 August 1934, Bishop Laurence Youens of Northampton celebrated the first public Mass in the Slipper Chapel in four hundred years. Two days later, Cardinal Francis Bourne led a National Pilgrimage of the Catholic Bishops of England and Wales, along with more than 10,000 people, to the shrine. From that date, it became the Catholic National Shrine of Our Lady of Walsingham.

== Holy mile ==
Since the 14th century, the Slipper Chapel has served as the final 'wayside' chapel on the pilgrimage route, marking the place where pilgrims traditionally removed their shoes to walk the last 'holy mile' to Walsingham Priory barefoot in a penitential spirit, hence its designation as the 'Slipper' Chapel. Alternatively, the moniker may have arisen from the Old English word for "between" ("slype") due to the chapel standing between everyday life and the main Walsingham shrine.

== Modern revival ==
The Slipper Chapel houses a venerated wooden image of Our Lady of Walsingham, inspired by an image in Santa Maria in Cosmedin. Carved in Oberammergau, Germany, in the late 19th century, the image was blessed in Rome by Pope Leo XIII. In 1982, the statue was transported to Wembley Stadium, where it was given a place of honour on the altar during Pope John Paul II's visit to Britain.

Each year on the Sunday nearest the 8 September, the Feast of the Nativity of Our Lady, the statue of Our Lady of Walsingham is carried in the Dowry of Mary Pilgrimage in a procession that begins outside the Slipper Chapel.

The Grade II listed presbytery was built in 1904, by architect Thomas Garner. Today, the complex surrounding the Slipper Chapel includes the Chapel of Our Lady of Reconciliation, completed in 1982, which accommodates up to 400 people for services and can open towards the pilgrimage area for larger ceremonies. The site also features a picnic area, gift shop, and tea room.

In 2007, the Slipper Chapel was featured in the BBC documentary series How We Built Britain, presented by David Dimbleby.

In 2018, the then Rector of the Catholic National Shrine and the then Priest Administrator of the Anglican Shrine of Our Lady of Walsingham signed an Ecumenical Covenant striving to work together as "shared custodians of the Holy Land of Walsingham" in "common witness to the unique vocation of the Blessed Virgin Mary" and to pray for unity which is "Christ's will for his Church".

== Canonical Coronation of the Image ==
On 15 August 1954, Pope Pius XII delegated his Papal Nuncio, Monsignor Gerald O'Hara, to crown the venerated image of the Virgin Mary under the title of Our Lady of Walsingham in his apostolic name. The coronation was funded by gold and jewels donated by Catholic women from across the country and accompanied by a papal bull issued by the Sacred Congregation of Rites.

According to contemporary footage from Pathé, approximately 15,000 pilgrims attended the coronation ceremony of the venerated image of the Virgin Mary at Walsingham. The event featured a solemn procession along the "holy mile" leading to the shrine, culminating in the canonical crowning performed by O'Hara on behalf of Pope Pius XII. A significant moment occurred when two white doves landed on the lap of the image, an event regarded by attendees as miraculous.

British and American military personnel from nearby RAF Sculthorpe reportedly provided event security for the large gathering. The Slipper Chapel also served as a place of worship for Catholic chaplains serving in the United States Air Force and USAF personnel stationed at RAF Sculthorpe.

== Status as a minor basilica ==
On 27 December 2015, Pope Francis elevated the Shrine to the status of a Minor Basilica, through a pontifical decree issued by the Congregation for Divine Worship and the Discipline of the Sacraments.

== Rectors ==
1. 1964–1968: Peter Harris (Westminster)
2. 1968–1978: Roland Connelly
3. 1979–1984: Clive Birch
4. 1984–1992: Peter Allen
5. 1992–2000: Alan Williams
6. 2000–2008: Noel Wynn
7. 2008–2015: Alan Williams
8. 2015–2020: John Armitage (Brentwood)
9. 2020–2023: Philip Moger
10. 2023–present: Robert Billing (Lancaster)

== Interior ==
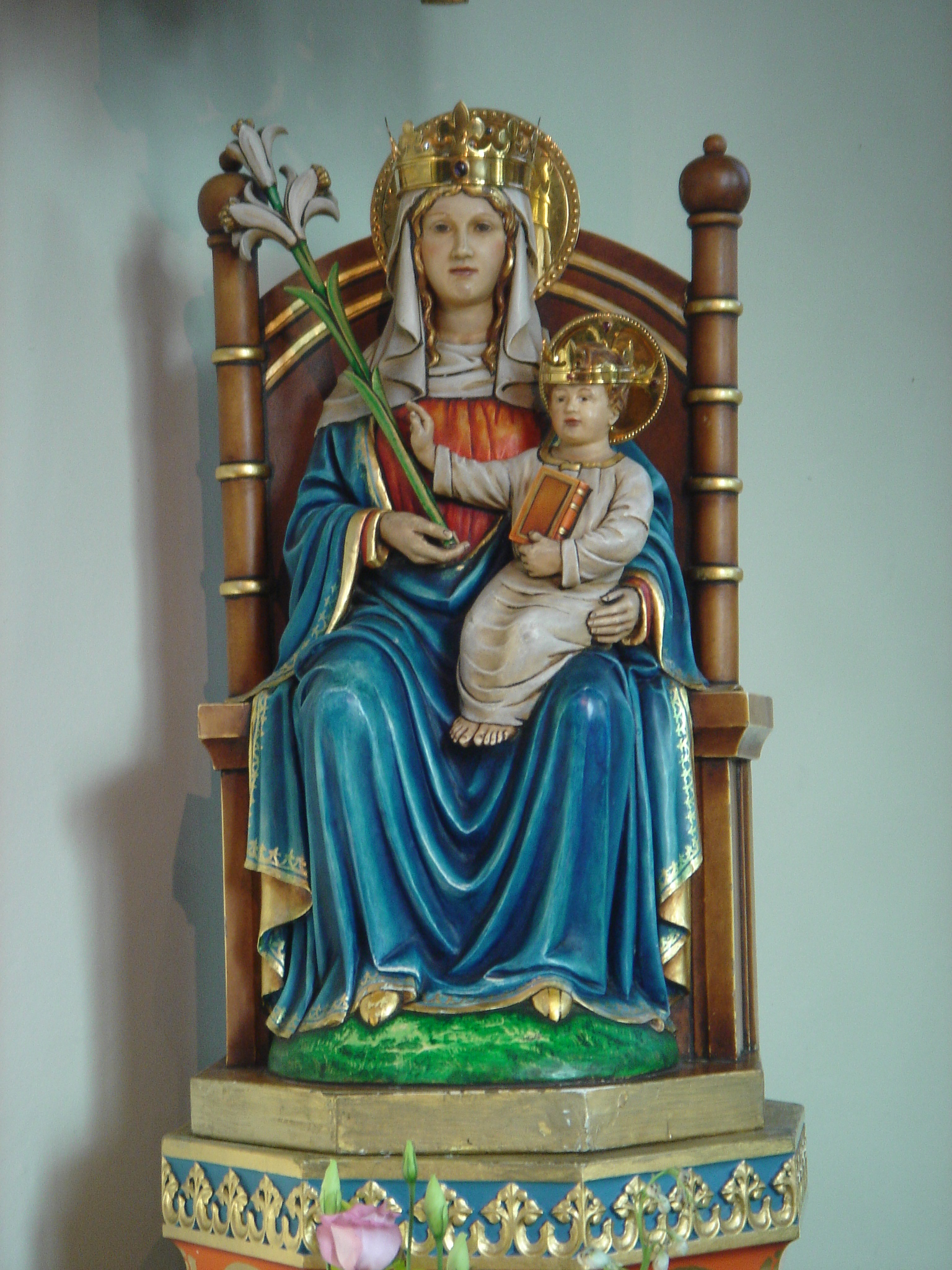
The venerated image of Our Lady of Walsingham granted a Canonical coronation by Pope Pius XII on 15 August 1954

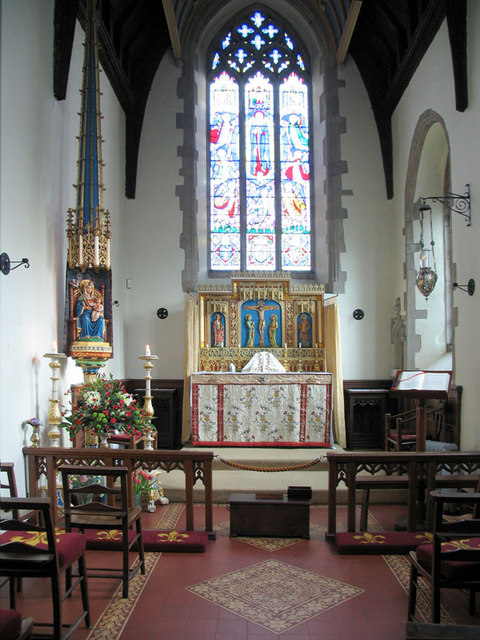
Inside the shrine's east end
