= Charles von Hügel =

Austrian noble, army officer, diplomat, botanist, and explorer

Baron Charles von Hügel
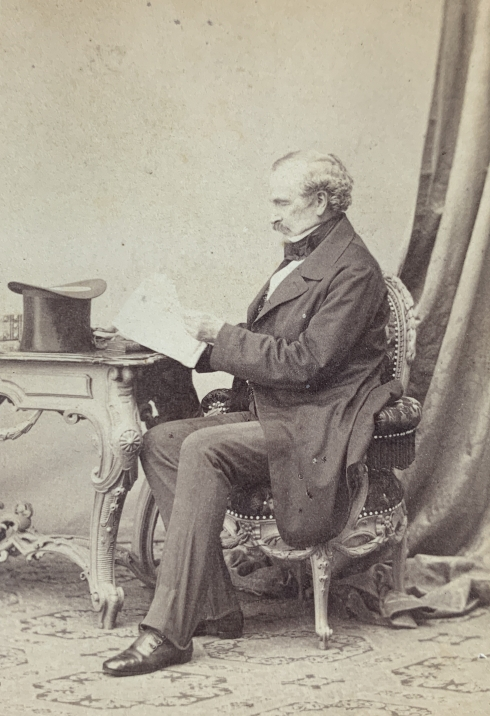
- Photograph of Baron von Hügel
- Born: Carl Alexander Anselm Baron von Hügel; 25 April 1795; Regensburg, Holy Roman Empire
- Died: 2 June 1870 (aged 75); Brussels, Belgium
- Occupations: noble, army officer, diplomat, botanist, and explorer
- Known for: travels in northern India during the 1830s
- Spouse: Elizabeth Farquharson
- Children: Friedrich von Hügel; Anatole von Hügel; Pauline von Hügel

Baron Charles von Hügel (born Carl Alexander Anselm Baron von Hügel; 25 April 1795 – 2 June 1870), sometimes spelt in English Huegel, was an Austrian nobleman, army officer, diplomat, botanist, and explorer, now primarily remembered for his travels in northern India during the 1830s. During his lifetime he was celebrated by the European ruling classes for his botanical garden and his introduction of plants and flowers from New Holland (Australia) to Europe's public gardens.

== Early life ==
Hügel was born in Regensburg, Holy Roman Empire, on 25 April 1795, as the son of Johann Aloys Josef von Hügel (1753–1825), a diplomat and a statesman, and his wife, Susanne Holthoff (1768–1837). In 1813, after studying law at Heidelberg University, he became an officer in the Austrian Hussars and fought in the armies of the sixth and seventh coalitions against Napoleon. After Napoleon's abdication, Hügel visited Scandinavia and Russia, before being stationed with other Austrian troops in southern France and then Italy.

In 1824, Hügel took up residence in Hietzing, a district of Vienna, where he established his botanical garden and set up a company to sell its flowers. He also became betrothed to a Hungarian Countess, Melanie Zichy-Ferraris, but in 1831 she broke off their engagement to marry the Austrian chancellor, Klemens Wenzel, Prince von Metternich.

== Grand Tour of Asia ==
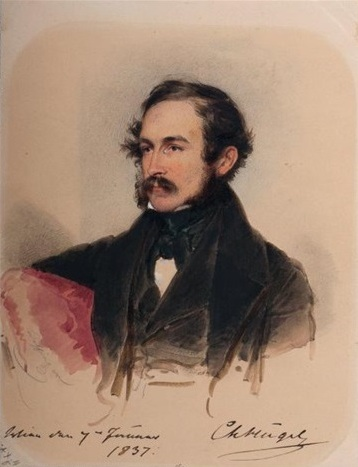
Portrait of Hügel, by Moritz Michael Daffinger, 1837

=== Kashmir and Punjab ===
In the wake of his misfortunes in love, Hügel undertook the grand tour of Asia that would establish his renown. From 1831 to 1836, he travelled to the Near East, the Indian subcontinent, the Far East, and Australasia, before returning to Europe by way of the Cape of Good Hope and Saint Helena. He seems to have been most intrigued by the Kashmir and Punjab regions of northern India, as he chose his experiences there to form the basis of the four-volume work published in the years following his return to Europe: Kaschmir und das Reich der Siek (literally "Cashmere and the Realm of the Sikhs"). The first and third volumes are an account of Hügel's journey across northern India, including his meetings with Maharaja Ranjit Singh, the Sikh ruler of the Punjab, in Lahore and a number of other European adventurers; the second volume provides descriptions of Kashmir's history, geography, and resources; and the fourth volume is a gazetteer.

After the final volume's publication, Major Thomas B. Jervis translated, abridged, and annotated an English edition of Hügel's work, published in London in 1845 by John Petheram. Four years later, primarily on the basis of this publication, the Royal Geographical Society awarded Hügel its Patron's Medal, "for his enterprising exploration of Cashmere."

Hügel entered the vale of Kashmir through Jammu region and exited the vale through Uri sector. He Reached Lahore via GT Road after reaching Lahore he set off for Mumbai to go to Austria via ship . He stayed for some days in Srinagar from Srinagar a famous Pir of Naqashbandi order travelled with him to Lahore. He penned down his traveling very meticulously. His account is interesting and gives fabulous information about the people, geography, rulers and their attitude towards their subjects. He gave the general characteristic of Muslims, Hindus and Sikhs etc. Raja Zabardast Khan was the ruler of Muzaffarabad at the time of his visit. He wrote about the deteriorating health of Zabardast Khan and was asked by the Muzaffarabad's Raja to do him a favour by asking Maharaja Ranjit Singh to release his son who was held hostage in Srinagar by the governor as a surety. After his stay in Muzaffarabad he set out for Haripur in Hazara. The way he took to reach Haripur was an old way. He mentioned various villages which came on his way. Abbottabad was not there at the time of his travel though he has mentioned various villages which are still in existence in the vicinity of Abbottabad and Haripur like Doab and Mirpur.

Noting the characteristics of the people, he observed that the people have a title of great esteem like Raja and Mir in their names but are subjects and subdues. Before reaching Lahore, Baron Hügel halted in Gujranwala, where he was the guest of Sardar Hari Singh Nalwa. He provides a detailed description of the Sardar's hospitality, residence and garden. In Lahore he was a guest of the Sikh ruler Maharaja Ranjit Singh. He had many detailed discussions with the Maharaja. Ranjit Singh liked Hügel's vision and requested him to train his army. The king offered to pay the Baron handsomely for his services but Hügel rejected Ranjit Singh's offer. His book gives the chronological history of the establishment of Sikh power in Punjab.

=== Australia, November 1833 – October 1834 ===
From November 1833 to October 1834, Hügel toured Australia, visiting the Swan River Colony and King George Sound (Western Australia), Van Diemen's Land (Tasmania), Norfolk Island and New South Wales to observe the flora and collect seeds for his garden. His large collection was later described by Endlicher et al. and his name is attached to a number of species, such as Alyogyne huegelii.

During this time, Hügel wrote a journal, later translated by Dymphna Clark, which, in addition to his botanical observations, is a rare record of an aristocratic European's attitudes towards colonial Australia.

Among those well-to-do settlers whom Hügel befriended in Sydney was the family of Colonel John George Nathaniel Gibbes, who shared his interest in scientific and cultural matters. In general, however, Hügel's opinions of the administration, transportation, social life and missionary efforts that he encountered in Australia, and wrote about in his journal, were not favourable. Hügel took exception to the ill-treatment and exploitation of the indigenous Australians (Aborigines) whom he observed on his travels.

== Return to Europe ==
After his return to Vienna, Hügel founded the Royal and Imperial Horticultural Society (K.K. Gartenbau-Gesellschaft), of which he was president between 1837 and 1848, and prepared his notes about northern India for publication. In 1847, he again became betrothed, this time to Elizabeth Farquharson, the daughter of a Scottish military officer, whom he had met in India during 1833. In 1849 he was awarded the Royal Geographical Society's Patron's Medal for his exploration of Kashmir.

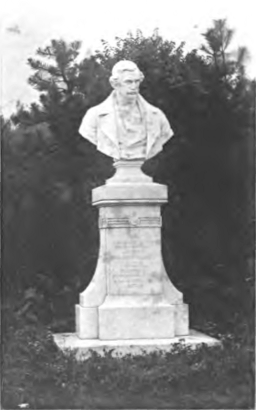
Memorial. The Hügeldenkmal at Hietzing, Vienna, by Johann Benks, 1901.

On the outbreak of the 1848 revolution, Hügel chaperoned his earlier rival in love Chancellor Metternich during his escape from Vienna to England. He then sold his garden, rejoined the Austrian army, and took part in the first Italian Independence war. From 1850 to 1859, he served as Austrian Envoy Extraordinary (ambassador) to the Grand Duchy of Tuscany in Florence, finally marrying Elizabeth Farquharson there in 1851. In 1860 he became the Austrian ambassador in Brussels and published a second work based on notes from his Asian tour, this time about the Philippines: Der Stille Ocean und die spanischen Besitzungen im ostindischen Archipel (The Pacific Ocean and the Spanish possessions in the East Indian archipelago). He retired from the Imperial service in 1867 and took his family to live in the seaside town of Torquay, Devon, England. Three years later, on 2 June 1870, he died in Brussels while on his way to visit Vienna.

Hügel's published books were on Kashmir, Australia, and the Philippines, but there is evidence that his intention was to compile and publish material about the other areas he had visited. To date, however, there seems to be no trace of the many thousands of notes he made during his travels, from which further publications might yet be compiled.

=== Children ===
Hügel and his wife Elizabeth Farquharson had three children, each of whom became notable in their own right. Friedrich von Hügel, born 1852, became a well-known Roman Catholic theologian; Anatole von Hügel, born 1854, became an anthropologist; and their daughter Pauline von Hügel, born 1858, is regarded as the founder of Corpus Christi Church in Boscombe, now part of Bournemouth, in Dorset, England.

According to Klemens von Metternich, Charles von Hügel had a natural son by Countess Jozefa Forgách de Ghymes. He was brought up in Russia and was given the name of Felix Sumarokov-Elston.

== Honours ==
- Knight First Class in Imperial Order of the Iron crown
- Knight in the imperial order of Leopold
- Officer in the Order of Leopold.
- Grand cross in the Order of Saint-Joseph of Tuscany
- Grand Cross in the Order of St. Gregory the Great
- Knight in the Papal Order of christ.
- Knight in the Order of the Red Eagle.
- Commander in the Order of the Dannebrog.
