= East Barsham =

Village in Norfolk, England

Coordinates: 52.868°N 0.849°E

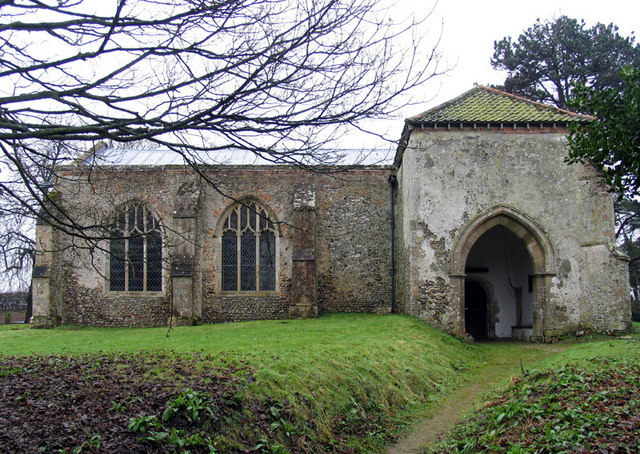
- All Saints' Church

- Location within Norfolk
- OS grid reference: TF9133
- Civil parish: Barsham
- District: North Norfolk
- Shire county: Norfolk
- Region: East
- Country: England
- Sovereign state: United Kingdom
- Post town: Fakenham
- Postcode district: NR21
- Dialling code: 01328
- Police: Norfolk
- Fire: Norfolk
- Ambulance: East of England
- UK Parliament: Broadland and Fakenham

East Barsham is a village and former civil parish, now in the parish of Barsham, in the North Norfolk district, in the English county of Norfolk.

East Barsham is located 3 miles (4.8 km) north of Fakenham and 23.8 miles (38.3 km) west of Cromer. The village is one of the four villages that make up the parish of Barsham, the other villages being North Barsham, West Barsham and Houghton St Giles.

== History ==
East Barsham's name is of Anglo-Saxon origin and derives from the Old English for the eastern part of Bar's village.

In the Domesday Book, East and West Barsham are listed together as a settlement of 104 households in the hundred of Gallow. In 1086, the village was divided between the East Anglian estates of King William I and William de Warenne.

East Barsham Manor is a manor house built between 1520 and 1530 by Sir Henry Fermor. The house was an important stopping point for wealthy pilgrims travelling to the Shrine at Walsingham and was used for this purpose by King Henry VIII, Catherine of Aragon and Anne Boleyn. The house was refurbished between 1920 and 1938 and is still in private ownership.

The White Horse Inn dates from the Eighteenth Century and is Grade II listed.

== Geography ==
In 1931 the parish had a population of 144. This was the last time separate population statistics were collected for East Barsham as on 1 April 1935 the parish was abolished to form Barsham.

The River Stiffkey runs through the village.

The nearest railway station is at Sheringham for the Bittern Line which runs between Sheringham, Cromer and Norwich. The nearest airport is Norwich International Airport.

== All Saints' church ==
East Barsham's former parish church is located on Fakenham Road, dates from the Seventeenth Century with some Twelfth Century features and has been Grade II listed since 1959.

All Saints' was re-furnished in the Victorian era but still boasts stained-glass from the Fifteenth Century.

== Governance ==
Dunton is part of the electoral ward of Walsingham for local elections and is part of the district of North Norfolk.

The village's national constituency is Broadland and Fakenham which has been represented by the Conservative Party's Jerome Mayhew MP since 2019.
