= Hempton =

Village in Norfolk, England

Coordinates: 52.82°N 0.83°E

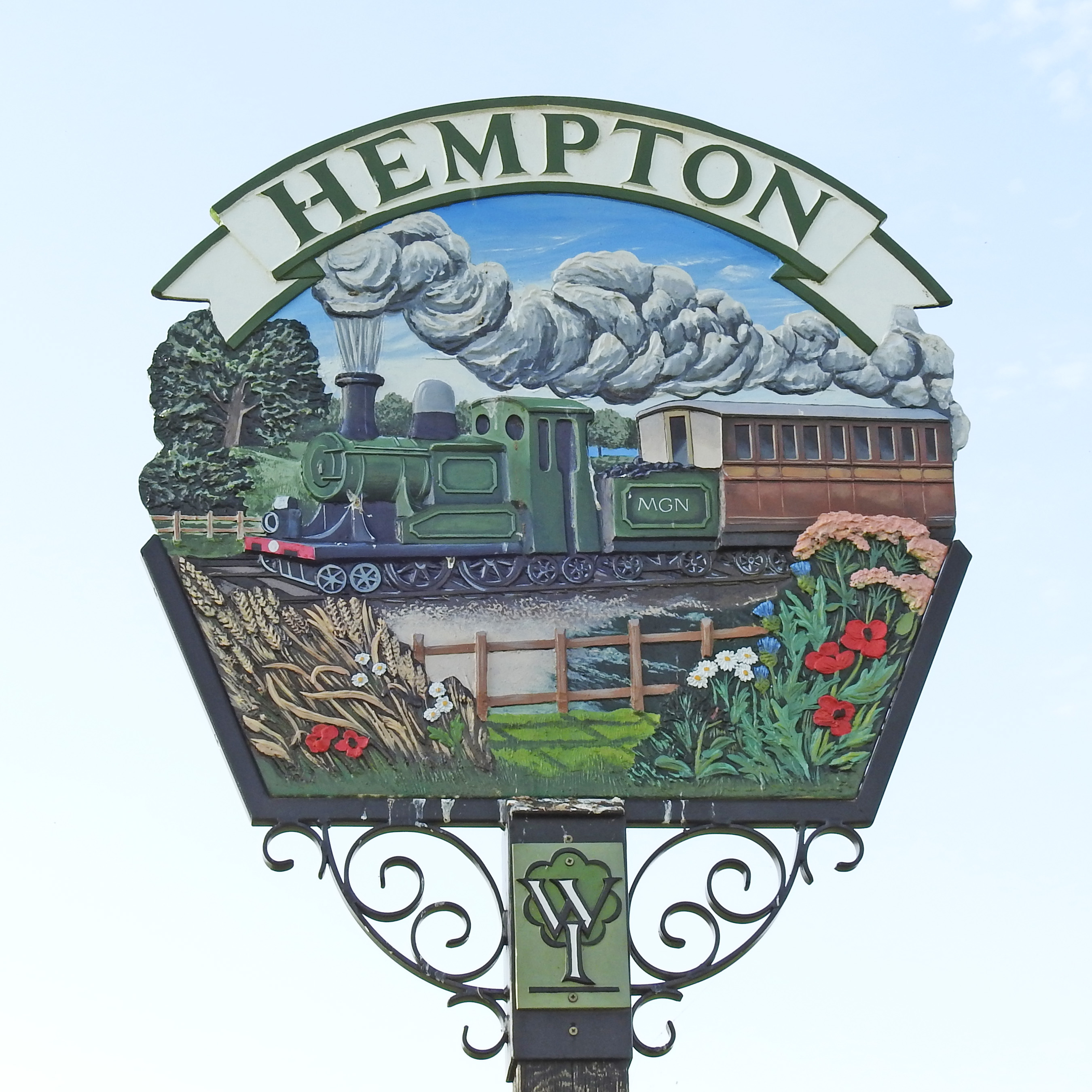
- Hempton Village Sign

- Location within Norfolk
- Area: 0.83 sq mi (2.1 km^{2})
- Population: 523 (2021 census)
  - Density: 630/sq mi (240/km^{2})
- Civil parish: Hempton
- District: North Norfolk
- Shire county: Norfolk
- Region: East
- Country: England
- Sovereign state: United Kingdom
- Post town: Fakenham
- Postcode district: NR21
- Dialling code: 01328
- Police: Norfolk
- Fire: Norfolk
- Ambulance: East of England
- UK Parliament: Broadland and Fakenham

Hempton is a village and a civil parish in the English county of Norfolk, along the course of the River Wensum.

Hempton is 0.8 miles (1.3 km) south-west of Fakenham and 33.9 miles (54.6 km) north west of Norwich.

== History ==
Hempton's name is of Anglo-Saxon origin and derives from the Old English for Hemma's settlement.

In the Domesday Book, Hempton is listed as a settlement of 8 households in the hundred of Brothercross. In 1086, the village was part of the East Anglian estates of William de Warenne.

In 1135, an Augustinian Hospital was founded in the parish which, by 1200, had evolved into a Priory. The building was dissolved in the Sixteenth Century. Recent excavations, coupled with research of records, have established that the importance of this priory had been lost to history. The Priory had previously owned the mill and owned the bridge to Fakenham, together with the next nearby bridge at Ryburgh,.

Between 1797 and 1925, a watermill stood in Hempton along the banks of the River Wensum, which was eventually demolished by the East Suffolk and Norfolk Drainage Board. Locally, the mill was known as Goggs' Mill after the miller, Thomas Goggs, who operated the mill from 1850 to 1912.

== Geography ==
According to the 2021 census, Hempton has a population of 523 people which shows an increase from the 505 people recorded in the 2011 census.

Hempton stands on the River Wensum and the A1065, between Mildenhall and Fakenham.

== Holy Trinity Church ==
Hempton's parish church was built in 1856 by John Henry Hakewill at the request of the Reverend Charles Moxon. Holy Trinity is located within the village on The Green and has been Grade II listed since 2006. The church remains open for Sunday service every week.

Holy Trinity was later expanded in the 1950s by J.P. Chaplin using stone from the Church of St. Michael at Thorn which was destroyed during the Norwich Blitz.

== Governance ==
Hempton is part of the electoral ward of The Raynhams for local elections and is part of the district of North Norfolk.

Hempton falls under the Fakenham & The Raynhams electoral division for local elections to return a county councillor to Norfolk County Council. Cllr Tom FitzPatrick has been the county councillor for the Division since 2013.

The village's national constituency is Broadland and Fakenham which has been represented by the Conservative Party's Jerome Mayhew MP since 2019.

== War Memorial ==
Hempton's war memorial is a set of brass plaques located inside Holy Trinity Church which list the following names for the First World War:

Rank	Name	Unit	Date of death	Burial/Commemoration
LCpl.	Robert F. Cooke	9th Bn., Lancashire Fusiliers	4 Oct. 1917	Cement House Cemetery
Dvr.	William Morgan	33rd Bde., Royal Field Artillery	28 May 1918	Hermonville Cemetery
Gnr.	Robert Barnes	22nd Bty., Royal Garrison Artillery	29 Sep. 1917	Ypres Reservoir Cemetery
Pte.	Christopher Gardner	2nd Bn., Border Regiment	16 May 1915	Le Touret Memorial
Pte.	Albert E. Yallop	265th Bty., Royal Garrison Artillery	12 Dec. 1917	Lijssenthoek Cemetery
Pte.	Charles E. Crisp	2/6th Bn., Gloucestershire Regiment	6 Apr. 1917	Thiepval Memorial
Pte.	Albert E. Nicholson	2nd (City) Bn., London Regiment	12 Apr. 1917	Arras Memorial
Pte.	Robert Howes	27th Coy., Machine Gun Corps	3 May 1917	Arras Memorial
Pte.	Frederick J. Varley	5th Bn., Norfolk Regiment	19 Apr. 1917	Gaza War Cemetery
Pte.	Lewis H. Wright	7th Bn., Norfolk Regt.	19 Feb. 1916	Chocques Cemetery
Pte.	Horace A. Rump (Note: Private Rump worked as a servant before enlisting in Norwich.)	8th Bn., Norfolk Regt.	19 Jul. 1916	Thiepval Memorial
Pte.	Richard H.M. Barnes	9th Bn., Norfolk Regt.	15 Sep. 1916	Serre Road Cemetery
Pte.	Henry J. Balls	9th Bn., Norfolk Regt.	14 Oct. 1917	Thiepval Memorial
Pte.	Charles E. Tuck (Note: Private Tuck worked as a bricklayer, apprenticed to his father Mr. Isaac Tuck, before enlisting in Norwich.)	9th Bn., Norfolk Regt.	18 Oct. 1918	Niederzwehren Cemetery
Pte.	Isaac Sheringham (Note: Private Sheringham worked as an Apprentice Printer before enlisting in Norwich.)	2nd Bn., Suffolk Regiment	11 Apr. 1917	Tilloy British Cemetery
Pte.	Robert Wright	11th Bn., Royal Sussex Regiment	16 Sep. 1916	Auchonvillers Cemetery

The following names were added after the Second World War:

Rank	Name	Unit	Date of death	Burial/Commemoration
SLt.	Glyn R. Glynn	HMS Manners	26 Jan. 1945	Fakenham Cemetery
FSgt.	Bernard Utting (Note: Flight Sergeant Utting was an Air Gunner aboard an Avro Lancaster.)	No. 9 Squadron RAF	31 Mar. 1944	Fakenham Cemetery
Sgt.	Donald A. Jones	5th Bn., Royal Norfolk Regiment	22 Jan. 1942	Kranji War Memorial
AS	Bertram G. Dew	HMS President	7 Nov. 1942	Portsmouth Naval Memorial
Gnr.	Frederick H. Barber	61 Regt., Royal Artillery	16 Dec. 1944	Schoonselhof Cemetery
Pte.	Ernest R. Smith	Royal Army Service Corps	12 Jan. 1940	Grange Road Cemetery
Pte.	Walter W. Chapman	2nd Bn., Hampshire Regiment	9 Sep. 1943	Salerno War Cemetery
Pte.	Ralph Jones	5th Bn., Royal Norfolk Regiment	14 Feb. 1942	Kranji War Cemetery
Pte.	Leslie Palmer	5th Bn., Royal Norfolks	14 Jun. 1943	Kanchanaburi War Cemetery
Pte.	Jack Tooley	5th Bn., Royal Norfolks	21 Sep. 1944	Kranji War Memorial
