= West Barsham =

Village in Norfolk, England

Coordinates: 52.866°N 0.830°E

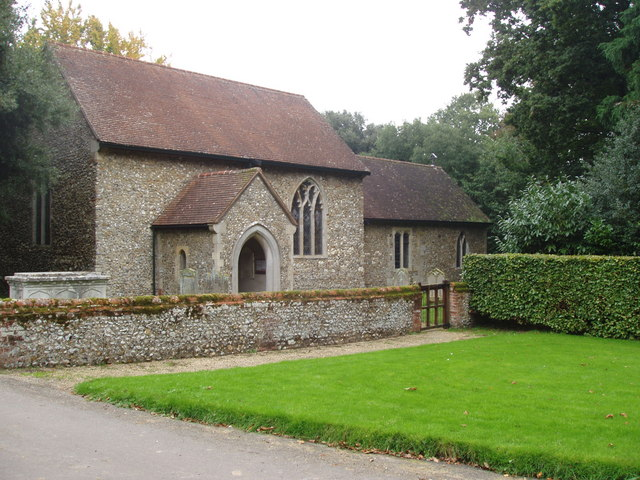
- West Barsham church The Assumption of the Blessed Virgin Mary

- Location within Norfolk
- OS grid reference: TF9133
- Civil parish: Barsham
- District: North Norfolk
- Shire county: Norfolk
- Region: East
- Country: England
- Sovereign state: United Kingdom
- Post town: Fakenham
- Postcode district: NR21
- Dialling code: 01328
- Police: Norfolk
- Fire: Norfolk
- Ambulance: East of England
- UK Parliament: Broadland and Fakenham

West Barsham is a village and former civil parish, now in the parish of Barsham, in the North Norfolk district, in the county of Norfolk, England. In 1931 the parish had a population of 89. On 1 April 1935 the parish was abolished to form Barsham.

The village is one of four settlements within the parish of Barsham. The other villages are North Barsham, East Barsham and Houghton Saint Giles.

West Barsham is 3.2 miles (5.1 km) north of the town of Fakenham, 24.1 miles (38.8 km) west of Cromer, and 117 miles (188 km) north of London. The nearest railway station is at Sheringham for the Bittern Line which runs between Sheringham, Cromer and Norwich. The nearest airport is Norwich International Airport.
