= Barney, Norfolk =

Village in Norfolk, England

Coordinates: 52.856°N 0.963°E

Barney
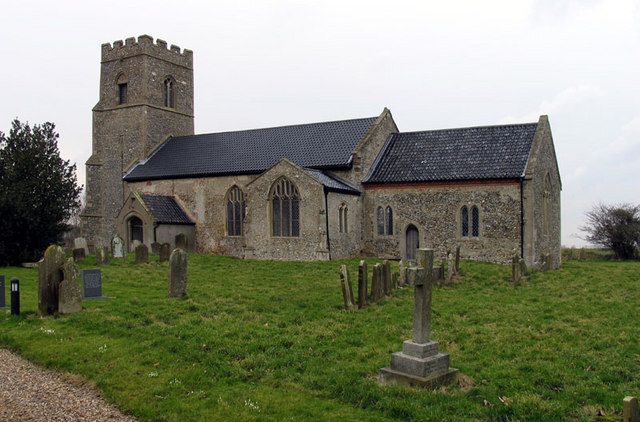
- St Mary Parish Church, Barney, Norfolk.

- Location within Norfolk
- OS grid reference: TF990320
  - London: 121 miles (195 km)
- Civil parish: Fulmodeston
- District: North Norfolk
- Shire county: Norfolk
- Region: East
- Country: England
- Sovereign state: United Kingdom
- Post town: FAKENHAM
- Postcode district: NR21
- Dialling code: 01328
- Police: Norfolk
- Fire: Norfolk
- Ambulance: East of England
- UK Parliament: Broadland and Fakenham

Barney is a village and former civil parish, now in the parish of Fulmodeston, in the North Norfolk district, in the county of Norfolk, England. Settled prior to the Norman Invasion of 1066, the village lies to the south of the A148 King's Lynn to Cromer road near Thursford.The village is 7.2 miles (11.6 km) east north east of the town of Fakenham, 17.1 miles (27.5 km) west south west of Cromer and 121 miles (195 km) north north east of London. The nearest railway station is at Sheringham for the Bittern Line which runs between Sheringham, Cromer and Norwich. The nearest airport is Norwich International Airport. In 1931 the parish had a population of 243.

On 1 April 1935 the parish was abolished and merged with Fulmodeston.
