= Fulmodeston =

Village in Norfolk, England

Coordinates: 52.83871°N 0.95817°E

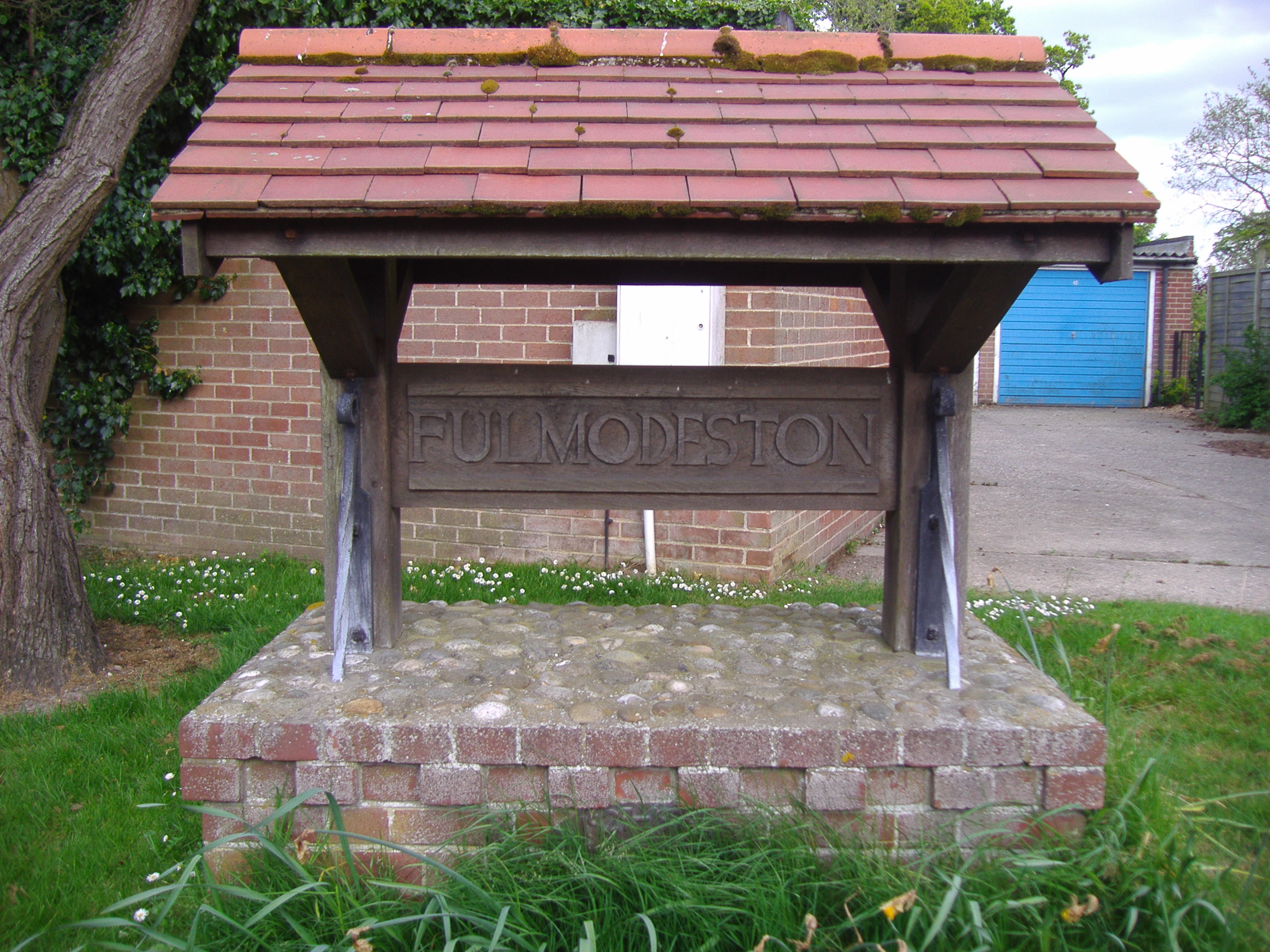
- Fulmodeston Village Sign

- Location within Norfolk
- Area: 5.81 sq mi (15.0 km^{2})
- Population: 424 (2021)
  - Density: 73/sq mi (28/km^{2})
- OS grid reference: TF9930
  - London: 120 miles (190 km)
- Civil parish: Fulmodeston
- District: North Norfolk
- Shire county: Norfolk
- Region: East
- Country: England
- Sovereign state: United Kingdom
- Post town: FAKENHAM
- Postcode district: NR21
- Dialling code: 01328
- Police: Norfolk
- Fire: Norfolk
- Ambulance: East of England
- UK Parliament: Broadland and Fakenham

Fulmodeston is a village and civil parish in the North Norfolk district, in the English county of Norfolk.

Fulmodeston is located 4 miles (6.4 km) south-east of Fakenham and 20 miles (32 km) north-west of Norwich, along the course of River Stiffkey. Fulmodeston parish also includes the small villages of Barney.

== History ==
The original name of the township (Fulmodeston cum Croxton) is of mixed Anglo-Saxon and Viking origin and derives from the Old English and Old Norse for Fulcmod's and Krok's settlements.

In the Domesday Book, Fulmodeston is listed as a settlement of 29 households in the hundred of Gallow. In 1086, the village was part of the East Anglian estates of William de Warenne.

During the Second World War, Fulmodeston was the site of a Starfish site, complete with dummy Bristol Blenheims and flare paths, to draw Luftwaffe attention away from RAF West Raynham.

The parish of "Fulmodeston" was formed on 1 April 1935 from Fulmodeston cum Croxton, Barney and Thursford parishes, on 1 April 1954 Thursford became a separate parish again.

== Geography ==
According to the 2021 census, Fulmodeston has a population of 424 people which shows a decrease from the 442 people recorded in the 2011 census.

Fulmodeston is located along the course of the River Stiffkey.

== St. Mary's Church ==
Fulmodeston's parish holds the ruins of St. Mary's Church which was built in the Fifteenth Century and abandoned in the Nineteenth Century.

== Christ Church ==
Fulmodeston's parish church was built in 1882 by William Basset Smith to replace the ruined St. Mary's Church. Christ Church is located on Croxton Road and has been Grade II listed since 1984.

The church holds a Norman-style font and holds Sunday services on a twice-monthly basis.

== Governance ==
Fulmodeston is part of the electoral ward of Stibbard for local elections and is part of the district of North Norfolk.

The village's national constituency is North Norfolk, which has been represented by the Liberal Democrat Steff Aquarone MP since 2024.
