= John Guinness =

British civil servant (1935–2020)

Sir John Ralph Sidney Guinness CB (23 December 1935 – 27 July 2020) was a British civil servant and businessman.

== Education and family ==
Guinness was educated at Rugby School and Trinity Hall, Cambridge.

In 1967 he married Valerie Susan North of Rougham Hall, Norfolk. The couple had three children, a daughter Lucy and sons Rupert and Peter. She died in March 2014.

== Career ==
Guinness had previously been a member of HM Diplomatic Service and had worked in the Cabinet Office (inter alia involved in the setting up of the National Heritage Memorial Fund) and had been Permanent Secretary of the Department of Energy from 1991 to 1992 and Chairman of British Nuclear Fuels Ltd from 1992 to 1993.

== Honours ==
In 1985 he was appointed a Companion of the Order of the Bath. In the 1999 New Year Honours list he was appointed a Knight Bachelor.

== Heritage interests ==
He was a trustee of the Royal Collection Trust and a governor of Compton Verney.

Guinness was a member of the National Portrait Development Committee and had a deep interest in and knowledge of portraiture, particularly British historical portraits. He was also a member of the East Anglia Regional Committee of the National Trust from 1989 to 1994.

For many years he lived at the Tudor palace of East Barsham Manor, near Fakenham in Norfolk, selling it on his wife's death.

He died on 27 July 2020.
