= Barsham, Norfolk =

Civil parish in the English county of Norfolk

Coordinates: 52.872°N 0.833°E

Barsham
- Location within Norfolk
- Area: 19.40 km^{2} (7.49 sq mi)
- Population: 232 (parish, 2011 census)
  - Density: 12/km^{2} (31/sq mi)
- OS grid reference: TF9133
  - London: 117 miles
- Civil parish: Barsham
- District: North Norfolk
- Shire county: Norfolk
- Region: East
- Country: England
- Sovereign state: United Kingdom
- Post town: FAKENHAM
- Postcode district: NR21
- Post town: WALSINGHAM
- Postcode district: NR22
- Dialling code: 01328
- Police: Norfolk
- Fire: Norfolk
- Ambulance: East of England
- UK Parliament: Broadland and Fakenham

Barsham is a civil parish in the English county of Norfolk, and includes the villages of East Barsham, North Barsham, West Barsham and Houghton St Giles. The villages are all situated within 2 miles (3.2 km) miles of each other, about 3 miles (4.8 km) north of the town of Fakenham and 28 miles (45 km) north-west of the city of Norwich. The headwaters of the River Stiffkey flow through both East and North Barsham and Houghton St Giles.

Originally all four villages had their own parishes, but these were merged to create a single civil parish in 1935. This parish has an area of 19.4 square kilometres (7.5 sq mi) and in the 2001 census had a population of 253 in 115 households, the population reducing to 232 at the 2011 census. For the purposes of local government, the parish falls within the district of North Norfolk.

The mediaeval pilgrimage centre of Walsingham is 1 1/4 miles (2.0 km) north of Houghton St Giles, and the Roman Catholic National Shrine of Our Lady or Slipper Chapel is located within the civil parish of Barsham. East Barsham Manor, in the village of East Barsham, is an important work of Tudor architecture.

The Wymondham to Wells Branch railway line ran through the parish, but this closed during the Beeching Axe of the 1960s.
