= Ringland, Norfolk =

Village in Norfolk, England

Coordinates: 52.68°N 1.16°E

Ringland
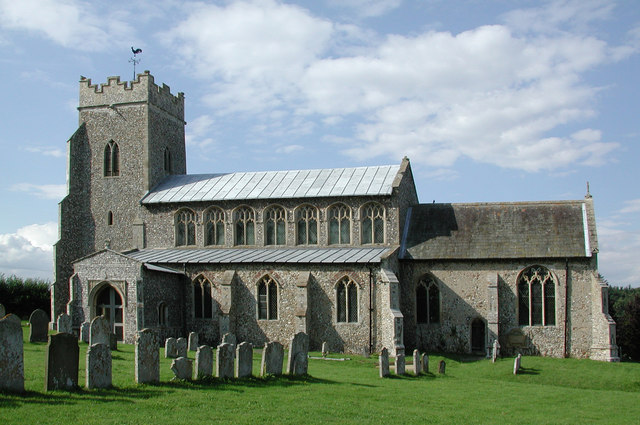
- St Peter's Church, Ringland

- Location within Norfolk
- Area: 1.95 sq mi (5.1 km^{2})
- Population: 260 (2011 Census)
  - Density: 133/sq mi (51/km^{2})
- OS grid reference: TG136139
- Civil parish: Ringland
- District: Broadland
- Shire county: Norfolk
- Region: East
- Country: England
- Sovereign state: United Kingdom
- Post town: NORWICH
- Postcode district: NR8
- Dialling code: 01603
- Police: Norfolk
- Fire: Norfolk
- Ambulance: East of England
- UK Parliament: Broadland and Fakenham

Ringland is a village and civil parish in Norfolk, England, and in the valley of the River Wensum, approximately 7 miles (11 km) north-west of Norwich. Parts of the Wensum valley within the parish constitute a Site of Special Scientific Interest. Ringland had a 2021 population of 236, in an area of 1.95 square miles (5.1 km^{2}).

The villages name means 'land of Rymi's people'.

The parish church of St Peter's has a 13th-century tower and a 14th-15th century nave and chancel.

The higher terrain of Ringland Hills lies within the parish to the east of the village and north of the Wensum, and are thought to be a glacial terminal moraine, much the same as Cromer ridge. The soil here is sandy with flint pebbles. Painter Alfred Munnings produced a work entitled Ponies on Ringland Hills.

The village has extensive common land: a lower area on the river Wensum and an upper area with the remains of a Beaker pit in the direction of Weston Longville.

The river was originally crossed by a wooden footbridge (and a ford for horse-drawn traffic). This was replaced in the 1924 with a concrete structure which remains today. Rare concrete 'tank traps' from World War II still exist by the banks of the Wensum.

The village originally had two public houses, the King of Prussia and the Swan Inn. The King of Prussia was renamed 'The Union Jack' during the First World War, and finally closed in the 1964.
