= Stiffkey Valley =

Site of Special Scientific Interest in Norfolk, England

Coordinates: 52.952°N 0.950°E

- Site of Special Scientific Interest
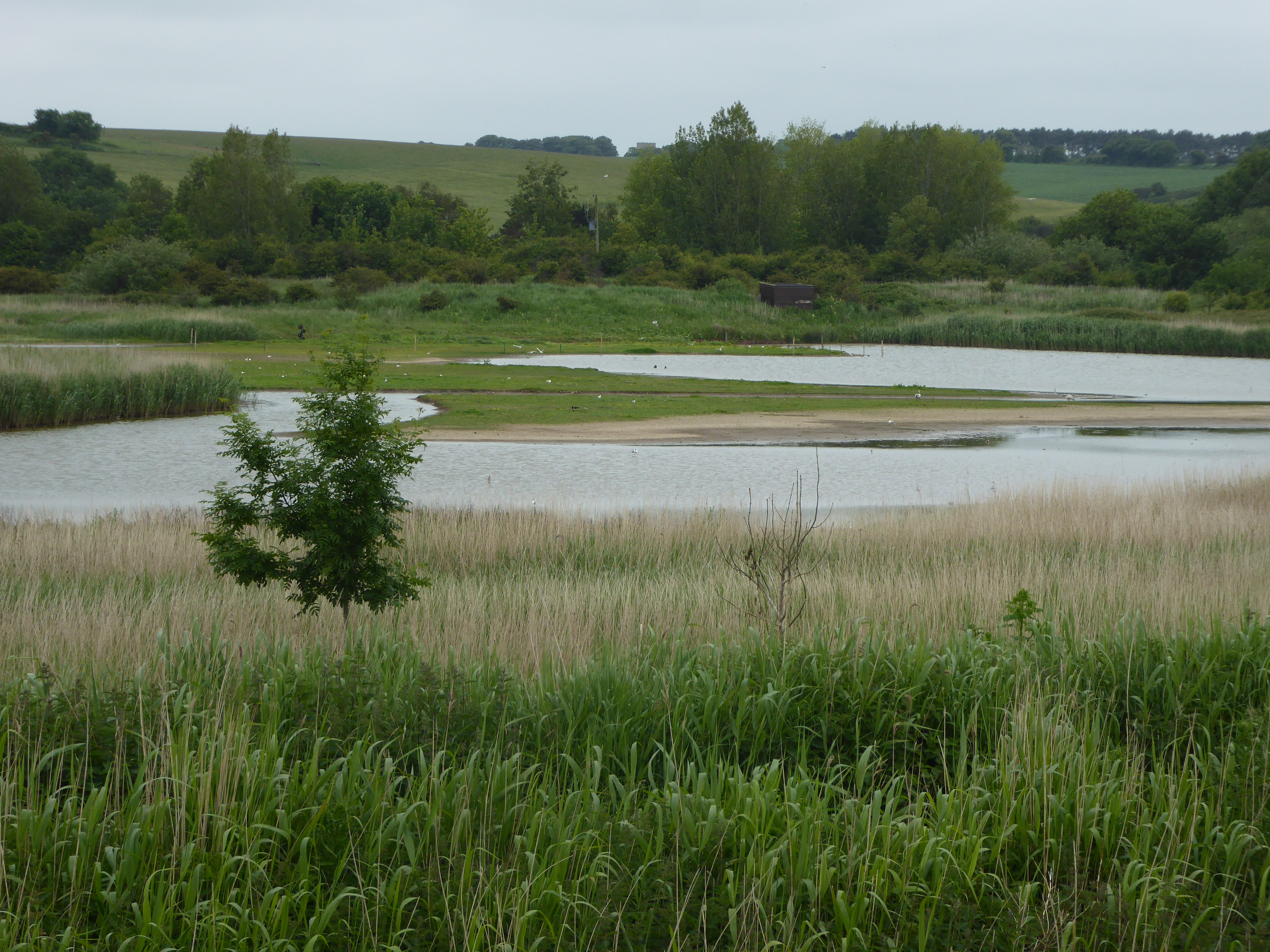
- Location of Stiffkey Valley.
- Area of search: Norfolk
- Grid reference: TF 983 435
- Interest: Biological
- Area: 44.4 hectares (110 acres)
- Notification date: 2002
- Location map: Magic Map

Stiffkey Valley is a 44.4-hectare (110-acre) biological Site of Special Scientific Interest east of Wells-next-the-Sea in Norfolk, England. It is in the Norfolk Coast Area of Outstanding Natural Beauty.

This valley has a range of wetland habitats in the floodplain of the River Stiffkey. It has many species of breeding birds, including nationally important populations of avocets. Wintering wetland birds include bitterns, brent geese and garganeys, while marsh harriers and barn owls hunt throughout the year.

There is no public access to the site.
