= Cockthorpe Common, Stiffkey =

Protected area in Norfolk, England

Coordinates: 52.947°N 0.952°E

- Site of Special Scientific Interest
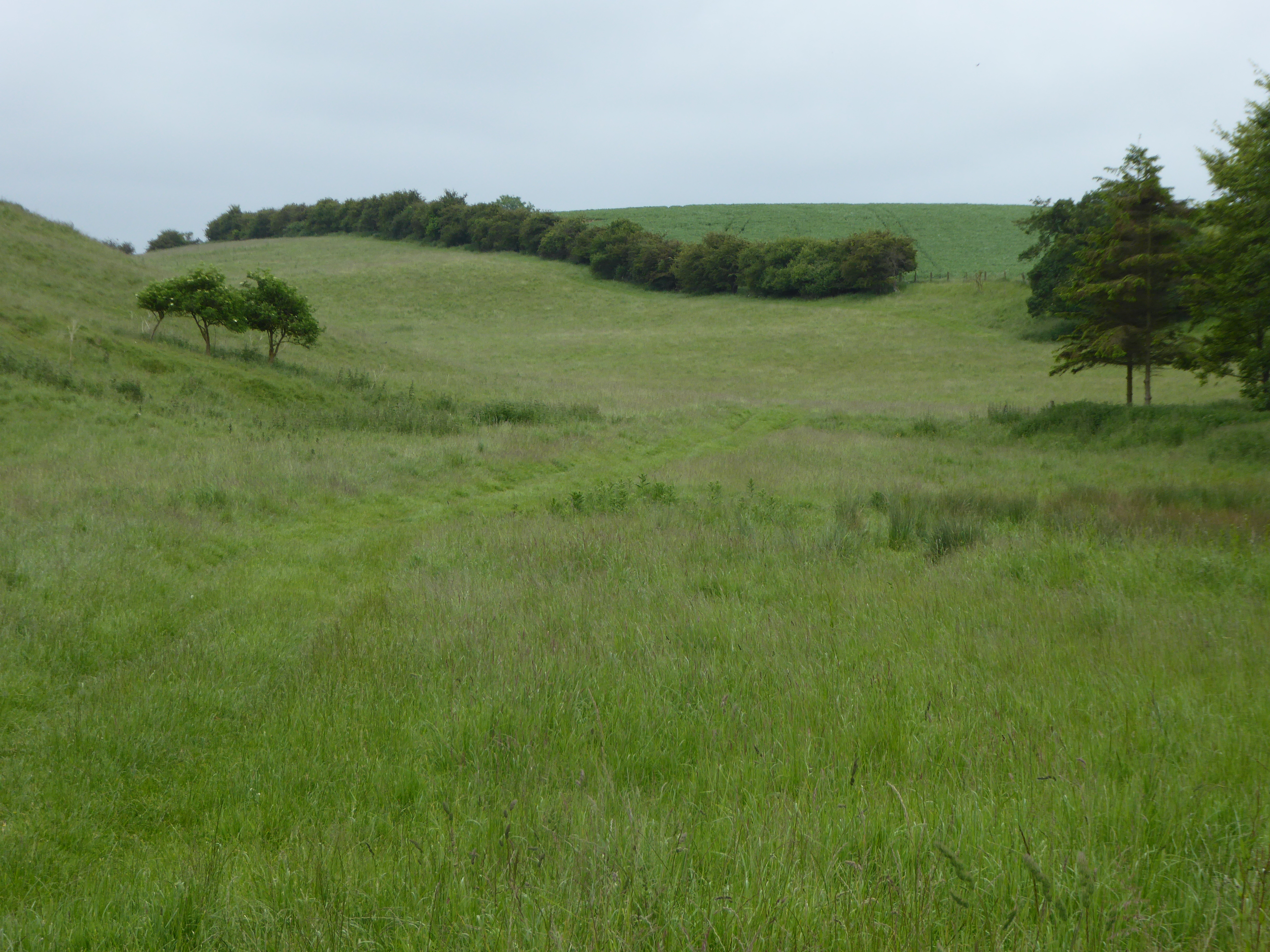
- Location of Cockthorpe Common, Stiffkey.
- Area of search: Norfolk
- Grid reference: TF 984 429
- Interest: Biological
- Area: 7.1 hectares (18 acres)
- Notification date: 1985
- Location map: Magic Map

Cockthorpe Common, Stiffkey is a 7.1-hectare (18-acre) biological Site of Special Scientific Interest east of Wells-next-the-Sea in Norfolk, England. It is in the Norfolk Coast Area of Outstanding Natural Beauty.

This common in the valley of the River Stiffkey has a varied chalk grassland flora on steep slopes. Herbs are abundant, including salad burnet, dropwort, common rock-rose, large thyme and cowslip.

A public footpath goes through the site.
