= Houghton St Giles =

Village in Norfolk, England

Coordinates: 52.885°N 0.858°E

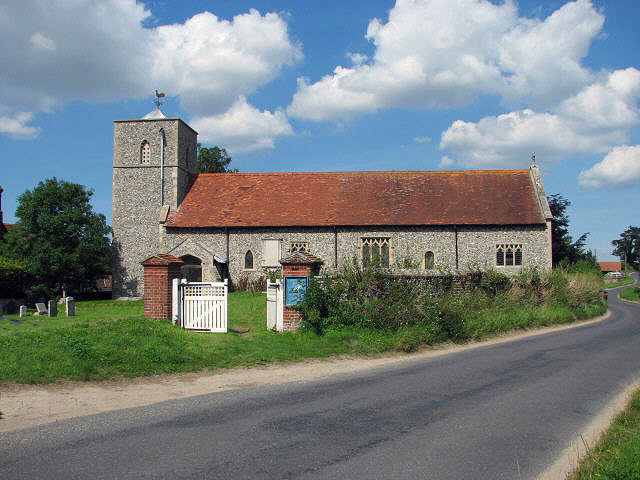
- St. Giles' Church

- Location within Norfolk
- OS grid reference: TF9235
- Civil parish: Barsham
- District: North Norfolk
- Shire county: Norfolk
- Region: East
- Country: England
- Sovereign state: United Kingdom
- Post town: WALSINGHAM
- Postcode district: NR22
- Dialling code: 01328
- Police: Norfolk
- Fire: Norfolk
- Ambulance: East of England
- UK Parliament: Broadland and Fakenham

Houghton St Giles is a village in the civil parish of Barsham, in the North Norfolk district, in the English county of Norfolk. The village has also been referred to as Houghton-le-Dale or Houghton-in-the-Hole.

Houghton Saint Giles is located 4.2 miles (6.8 km) north of Fakenham and 26 miles (42 km) north-west of Norwich, along the course of the River Stiffkey.

== History ==
Houghton Saint Giles' name is of Anglo-Saxon origin and derives from the Old English for hill-spur farmstead with the honorific of Saint Giles added.

In the Domesday Book, Houghton Saint Giles is listed as a settlement of 10 households in the hundred of North Greenhoe. In 1086, the village was part of the East Anglian estates of King William I.

Within the village is the Basilica of Our Lady of Walsingham which was built in the mid-Fourteenth Century as a 'slipper chapel' for pilgrims to leave their shoes as they proceeded barefoot to Walsingham Priory. The chapel fell into disrepair during the Reformation and was restored between 1896 and 1934, now serving a site of pilgrimage for Roman Catholics.

== Geography ==
The village is one of four settlements that are within the parish of Barsham; the other villages are West Barsham, East Barsham and North Barsham. Originally all four villages had their own parishes, but these were merged to create a single civil parish on 1 April 1935. In 1931 the parish had a population of 142.

The River Stiffkey passes through the parish.

== St. Giles' church ==
Saint Giles' church is dedicated to Saint Giles and dates from the Nineteenth Century, being built by William Eden Nesfield. St. Giles' is located on Walsingham Road and has been Grade I listed since 1959. The church holds Sunday service once a month.

The church has a medieval painted rood screen and holds unusual painted statues of Saint Mary and Saint Giles.

== Governance ==
Houghton Saint Giles is part of the electoral ward of Walsingham for local elections and is part of the district of North Norfolk.

The village's national constituency is Broadland and Fakenham which has been represented by the Conservative Party's Jerome Mayhew MP since 2019.
