= Auchonvillers =

- Commune
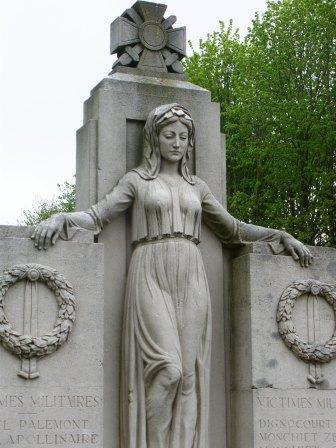
- War memorial in Auchonvillers
- Location of Auchonvillers
- Location within France Location within Hauts-de-France
- Coordinates: 50°04′53″N 2°37′51″E
- Country: France
- Region: Hauts-de-France
- Department: Somme
- Arrondissement: Péronne
- Canton: Albert
- Intercommunality: CC Pays Coquelicot

Government
  - Mayor (2020–2026): Cyril Carnel
- Area^{1}: 5.72 km^{2} (2.21 sq mi)
- Elevation: 158 m (518 ft)
- Highest elevation: 157 m (515 ft)
- Lowest elevation: 117 m (384 ft)
- Population (2023): 125
  - Density: 21.9/km^{2} (56.6/sq mi)
- Time zone: UTC+01:00 (CET)
  - Summer (DST): UTC+02:00 (CEST)
- INSEE/Postal code: 80038 /80560
- ^{1} French Land Register data, which excludes lakes, ponds, glaciers > 1 km^{2} (0.386 sq mi or 247 acres) and river estuaries.

Auchonvillers (French pronunciation: [oʃɔ̃vile]; Picard: Chonvilé) is a commune in the Somme department in Hauts-de-France in northern France.

Its name seems to come from an old German man's name Alko (hypocoristic for a name starting Alk-) or similar (who invaded with the Franks in the 5th century AD), and Latin villare ("[land] belonging to a villa, farm").

== First World War ==
The area was involved in the Battle of the Somme. There is a Commonwealth War Cemetery in the commune. English-speaking troops commonly rendered the place's name as 'Ocean Villas'; British gunners also knew it as 'Eight-inch Villas'.

== See also ==
- Communes of the Somme department
- Auchonvillers Military Cemetery
