= North Barsham =

Village in Norfolk, England

Coordinates: 52.878°N 0.845°E

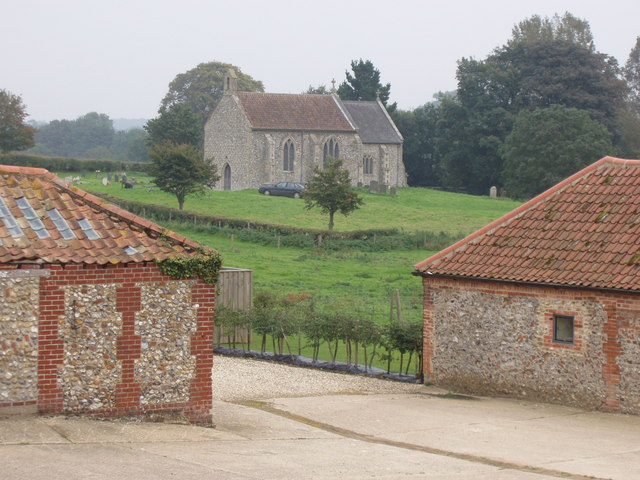
- The parish church of All Saints, North Barsham

- Location within Norfolk
- OS grid reference: TF9133
- Civil parish: Barsham
- District: North Norfolk
- Shire county: Norfolk
- Region: East
- Country: England
- Sovereign state: United Kingdom
- Post town: Walsingham
- Postcode district: NR22
- Dialling code: 01328
- Police: Norfolk
- Fire: Norfolk
- Ambulance: East of England
- UK Parliament: Broadland and Fakenham

North Barsham is a village and a former civil parish, now in the parish of Barsham, in the North Norfolk district, in the county of Norfolk, England. In 1931, the parish had a population of 79.

The village is one of four settlements within the parish of Barsham. The other villages are West Barsham, East Barsham and Houghton St Giles. Originally all four villages had their own parishes, but these were merged to create a single civil parish on 1 April 1935. North Barsham is 5 miles (8.0 km) north of the town of Fakenham, 22.8 miles (36.7 km) south-west of Cromer and 118 miles (190 km) north of London.

The nearest railway station is at Sheringham for the Bittern Line. The nearest airport is Norwich International Airport.
