= East Barsham Manor =

Tudor prodigy house in Norfolk, England

Coordinates: 52.8685°N 0.8470°E

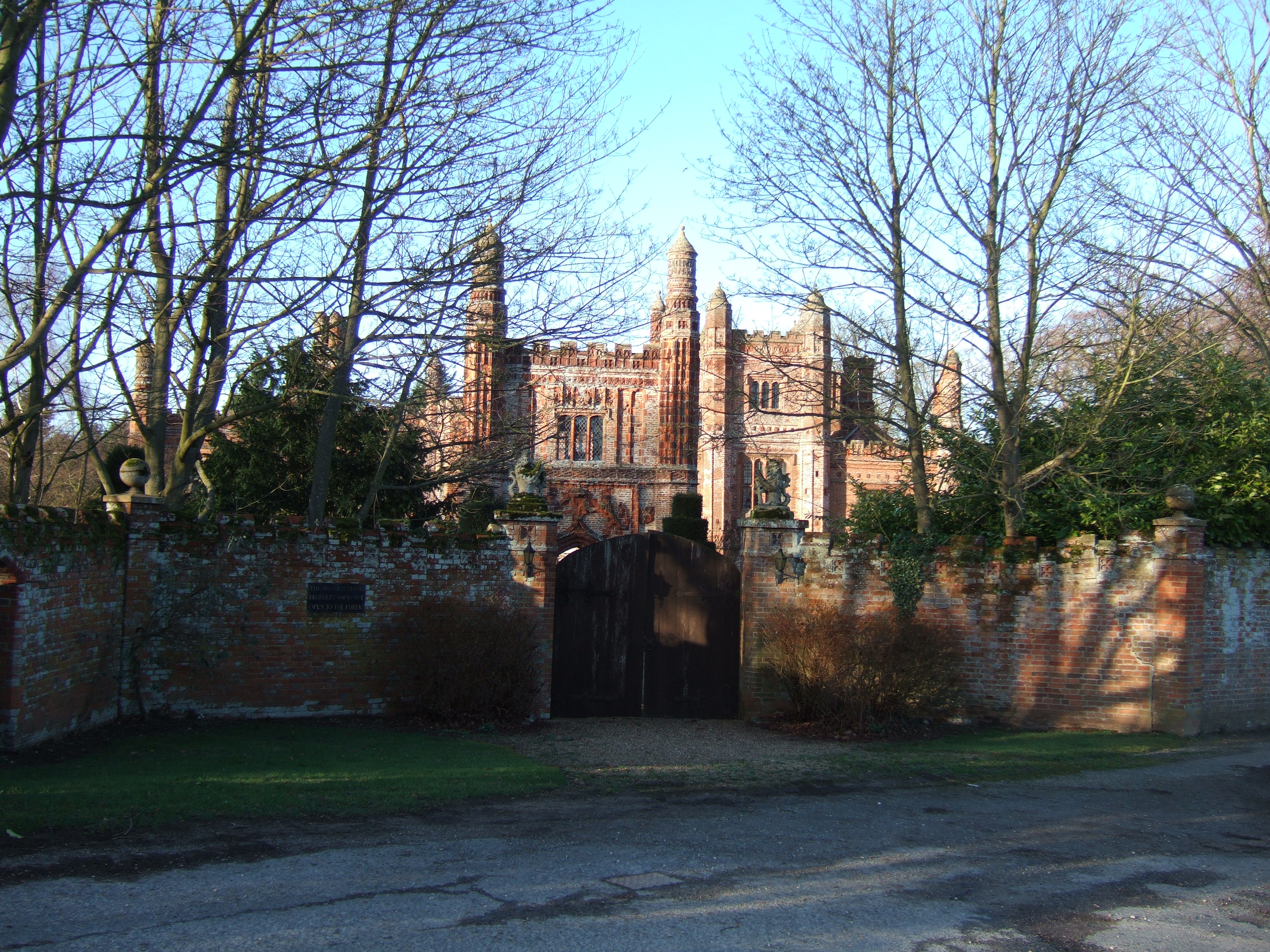
East Barsham Manor

East Barsham Manor is an important work of Tudor architecture, a leading and early example of a prodigy house, originally built in the 1520s. It is located in the village of East Barsham, about 2.5 miles (4.1 km) north of the town of Fakenham and 2.1 miles (3.4 km) south west of the village of Walsingham in the English county of Norfolk. It is protected as a Grade I listed building.

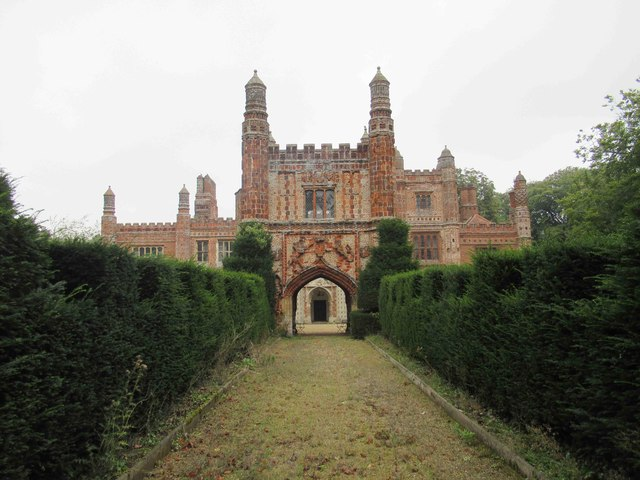
The gatehouse

== History ==
The two-storey manor house was built for Sir Henry Fermor in the 1520s. It was visited many times by Henry VIII with Anne Boleyn and Catherine of Aragon, including using it as a base for visiting the nearby Walsingham shrine.

After the Fermors the house passed to the Calthorpes who had married into the Fermor family. Later it was owned by the L'Estranges c1720 and then the Astleys. During these years, the house barely changed. However, in the 18th century it fell into decline.

By the 19th century it was largely derelict, and was visited by lovers of romantic ruins. It was restored in the 1920s and 1930s. The house was owned for many years by Sir John Guinness, a former diplomat who also helped found the National Heritage Memorial Fund. He sold it after the death of his wife in 2014 for £2.75m to the artist and entrepreneur Roy Griffiths.

In 2025 a painting of the Madonna and Child by Antonio Solario, which had been kept at the house by Baron and Baroness de Dozsa, was returned to its rightful owner after being identified as stolen.

== Brickwork ==
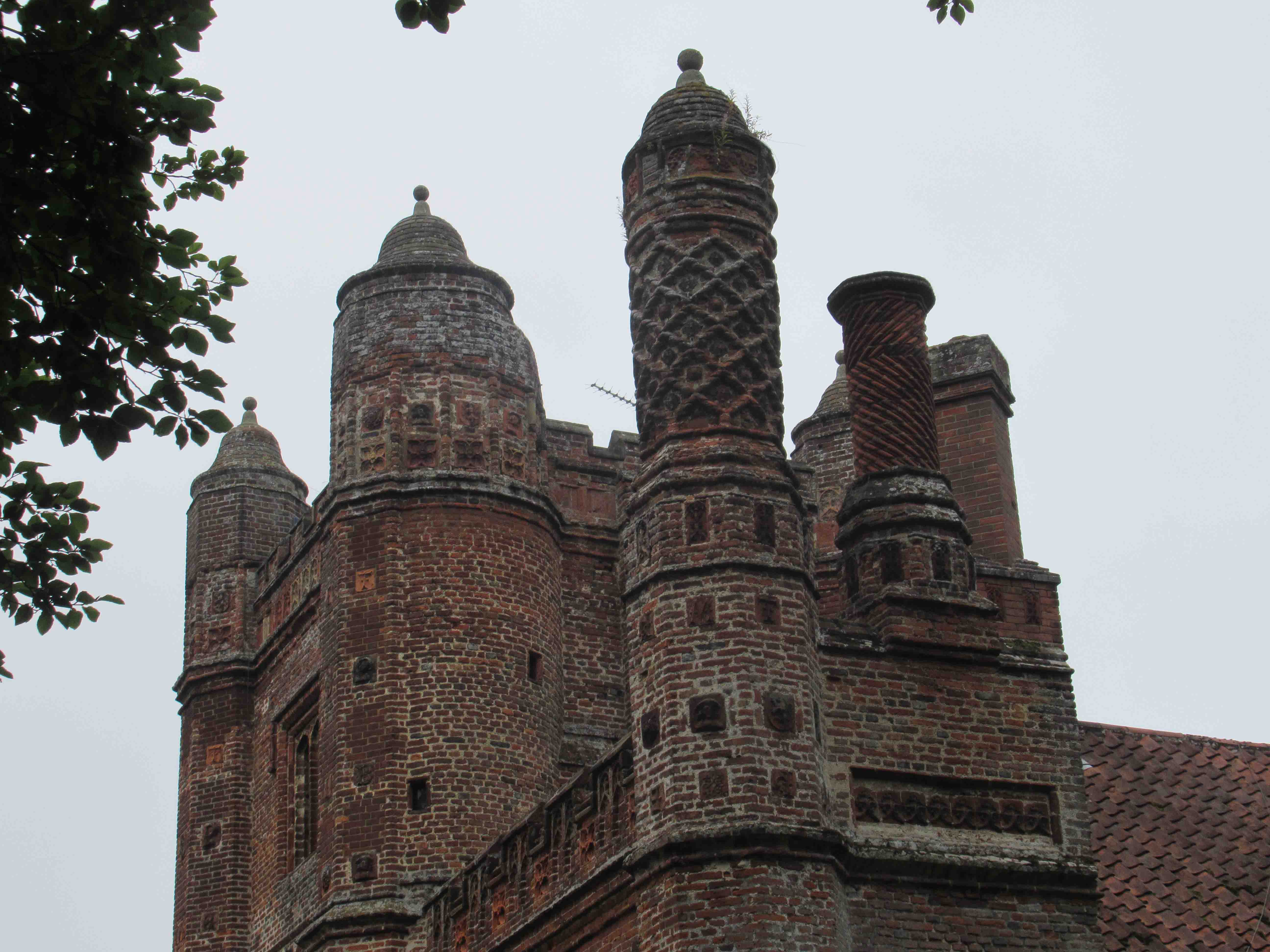
Brick chimneys and turrets on the main house

East Barsham is noteworthy for its ornate Tudor brickwork, and its cluster of 10 chimneys. Sir Henry built it not only with "a brick gatehouse, ribbed, turreted and emblazoned with his coat of arms, but a grand exuberance of chimneys, clustered together in double banks of five, each individual stack to a different design."

It was built contemporaneously with Sutton Place, Surrey (1520s), also built in brick, to which it is comparable.

== Architectural legacy ==
The entrance front of Dalmeny House in Scotland, designed by William Wilkins in 1814, is based on the facade of East Barsham Manor.

== See also ==
- Tudor architecture
