= River Stiffkey =

River in Norfolk, England

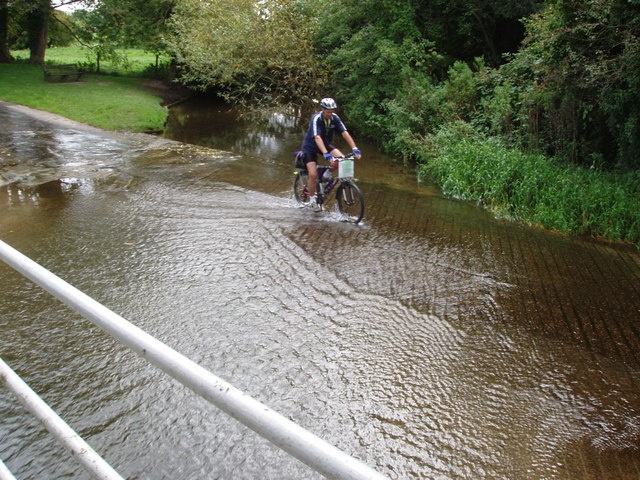
- Crossing Ford near Great Walsingham

- River Stiffkey within North Norfolk

Location
- Country: England
- State: Norfolk
- Region: East of England
- District: North Norfolk

Physical characteristics
- Source
  - location: Swanton Novers
  - coordinates: 52.8555°N 0.9962°E
  - elevation: 90 m (300 ft)
- Mouth: Freshes creek
  - location: behind the spit, Blakeney Point
  - coordinates: 52.9574°N 0.9610°E
  - elevation: 0 m (0 ft)
- Length: 18 mi (29 km)

Basin features
- Watermills: Little Walsingham

The River Stiffkey is a chalk stream running through an area of north Norfolk, England from its source near Swanton Novers to flow out into the North Sea on the north Norfolk coast near the village of Stiffkey. The river has been dredged historically, presumably for agricultural purposes, and has a self-sustaining population of brown trout.

== Course ==
The river's source is a small wooded lake just north of the village of Swanton Novers, after which the river passes close to Fulmodeston, then north to pass through the village of Great Snoring, which is noted in the Domesday Book as having a watermill. From Great Snoring it runs south past Thorpland Hall, then north-west through East Barsham, North Barsham and Houghton St Giles to Little Walsingham, the largest settlement on its course.

The Priory in Little Walsingham was built with stone from Northamptonshire which had been towed up the River Stiffkey in flat-bottomed barges. The priory had a watermill on the river but this was demolished early in the 20th century.

From here it flows north past Great Walsingham, then through Wighton and Warham before passing through the village of Stiffkey and out to its estuary on Stiffkey Salt Marshes. The area from Great Walsingham to Stiffkey is prone to flooding and was the subject of a severe flood warning in October 2004.

== History ==
The river is probably named after the village of Stiffkey, whose name means "Island with tree-stumps".

== Gallery ==
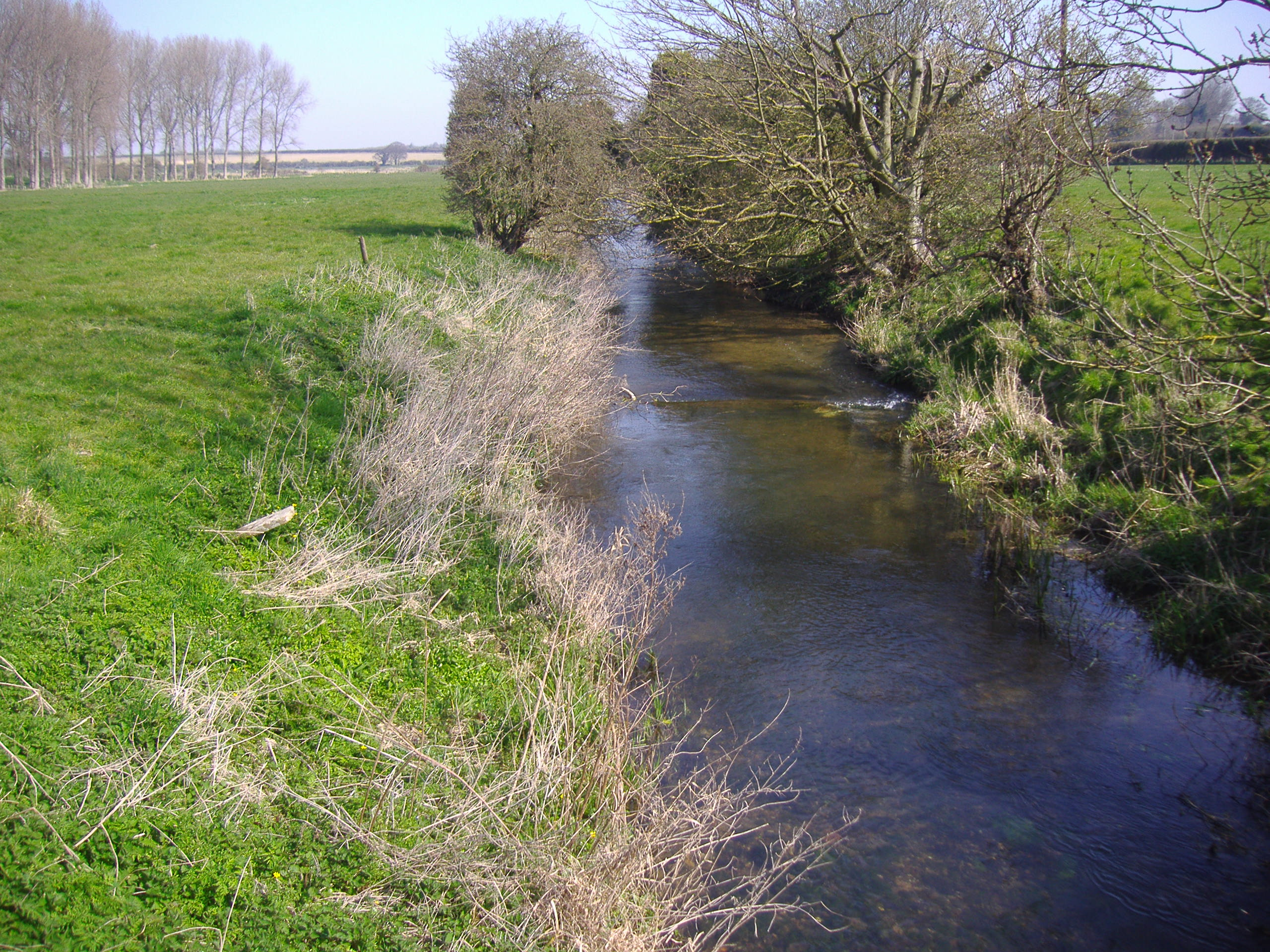
The River Stiffkey at Warham

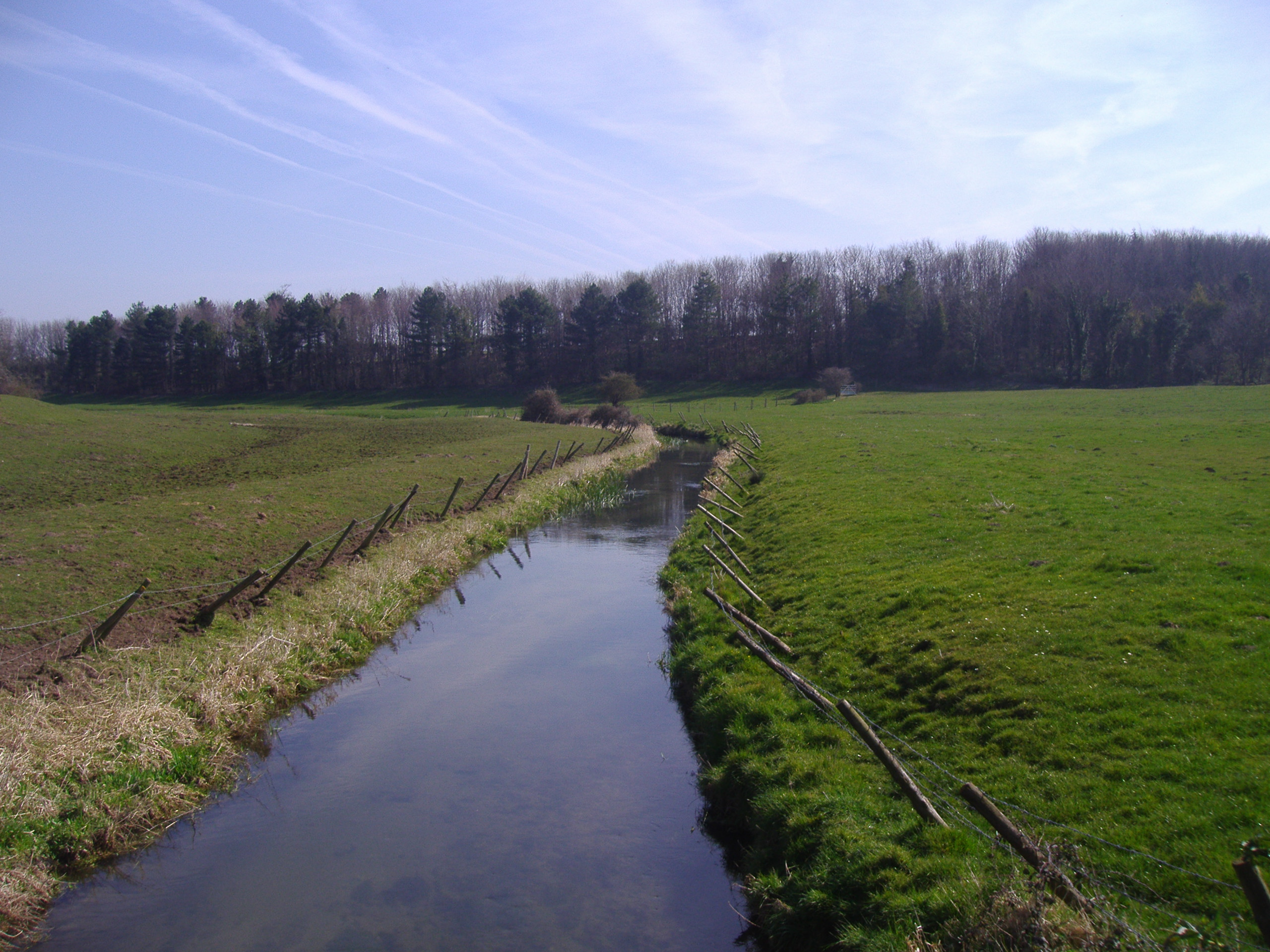
The river at Wighton

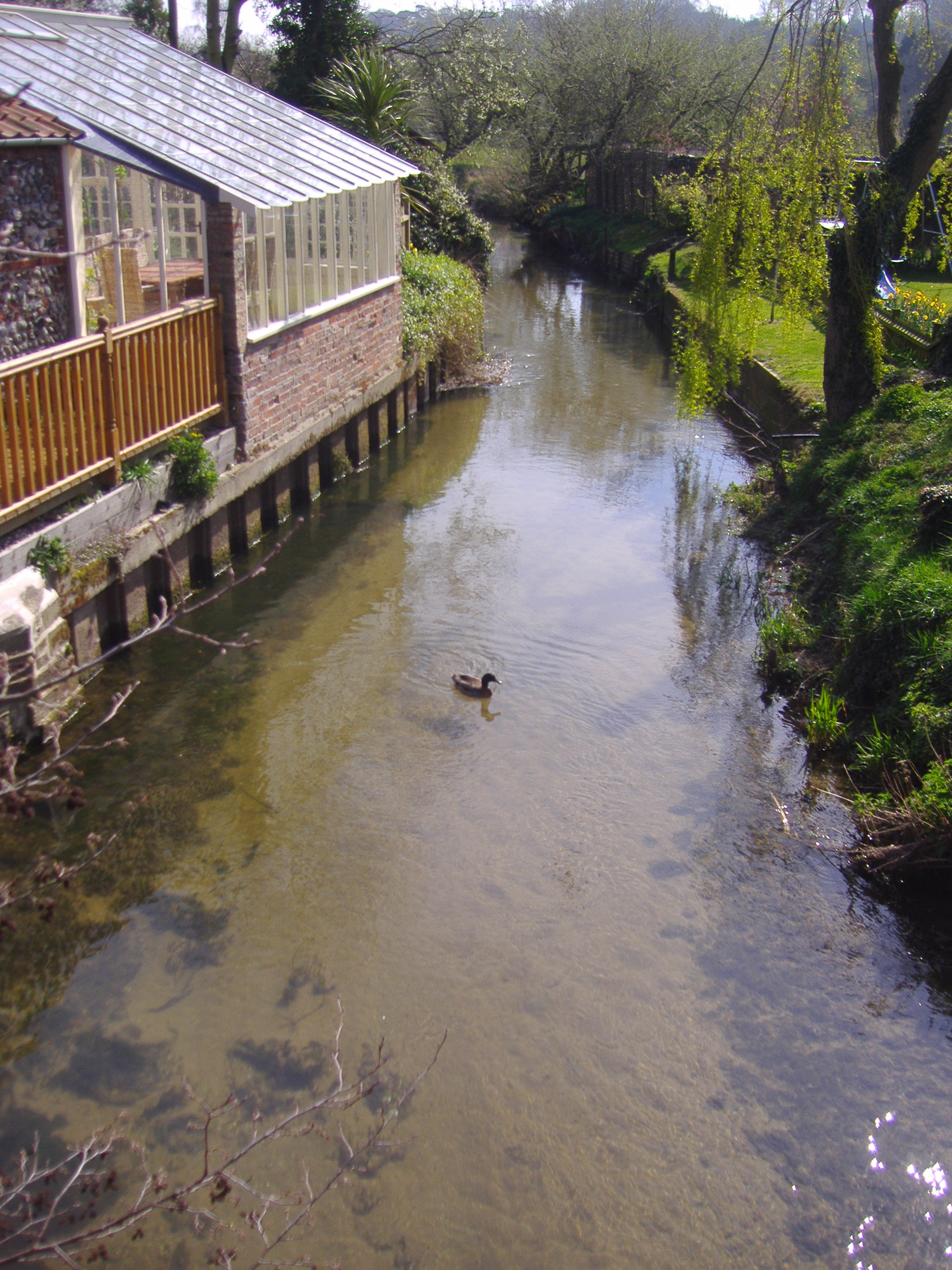
The river as it flows through the village of Stiffkey

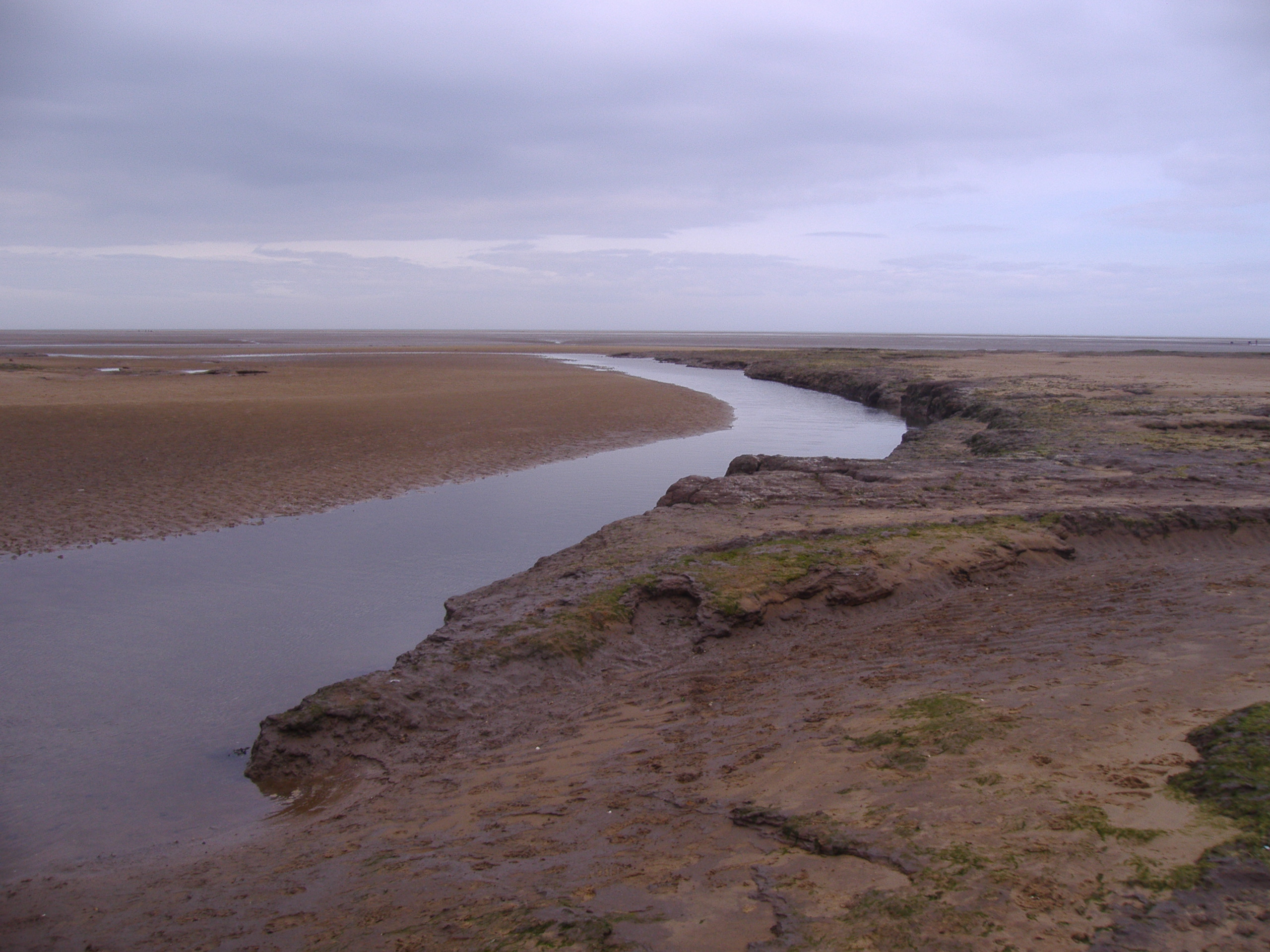
Stiffkey Salt Marsh and the mouth of the river
