= Norwich Blitz =

Bombing of Norwich by the Luftwaffe during World War II

The Norwich Blitz refers to the heavy bombing of Norwich and surrounding area by the German Luftwaffe during World War II. The bombings launched on numerous British cities were known as the Blitz.

Initially bombed in the summer of 1940, Norwich was subsequently not attacked until April and May 1942 as part of the so-called Baedeker raids, in which targets were chosen for their cultural and historical value and not as a strategic or military target. St Julian's Church was a direct hit and almost totally destroyed although rebuilt after the War. The most devastating of these attacks occurred on the evening of 27 April 1942 and continued again on 29 April. There were further attacks in May and a heavy bombardment on 26 and 27 June in which Norwich Cathedral was damaged. Norwich Castle, the City Hall and the Guildhall escaped while many residential streets were destroyed.

== Background ==
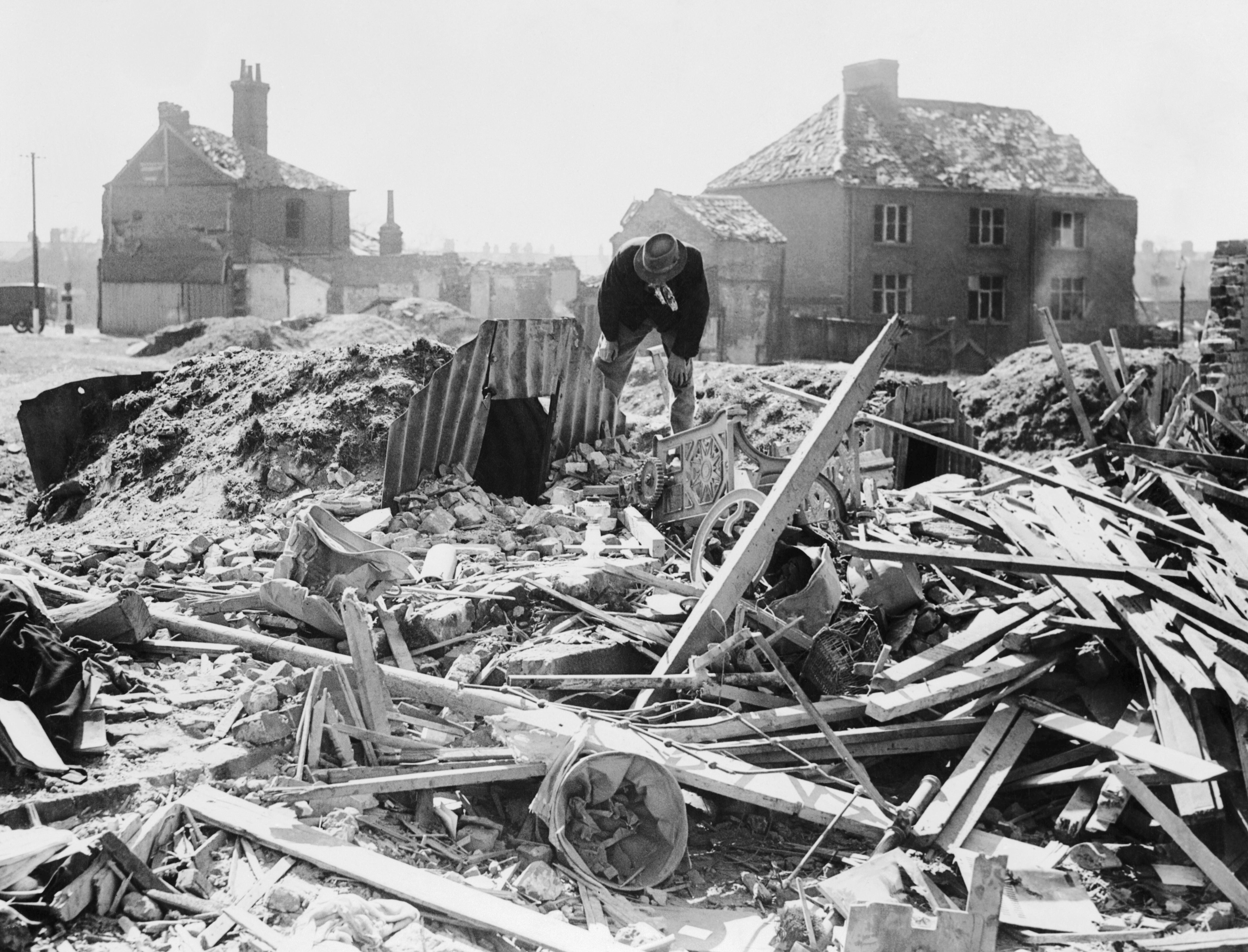
An Anderson shelter standing intact amid a scene of debris in Norwich

Norwich suffered extensive bomb damage during the Second World War, affecting large parts of the old city centre and Victorian terrace housing around the centre. Industry and rail infrastructure also suffered. The heaviest raids occurred on the nights of 27/28 and 29/30 April 1942; as part of the Baedeker raids; attacks on Bath, Canterbury, Norwich, Exeter, and York using Baedeker's series of tourist guides to the British Isles. Norwich became one of the targets of the so-called "Baedeker Blitz", which took place in retaliation for the bombing of Lübeck by the RAF earlier that year.

Lord Haw-Haw made reference to the imminent destruction of Norwich's new City Hall (completed in 1938), although in the event it survived unscathed. Significant targets hit included the Morgan's Brewery building, Coleman's Wincarnis works, City Station, the Mackintosh chocolate factory, and shopping areas including St Stephen's Street and St Benedict's Street, the site of Bond's department store (now John Lewis) and Curl's department store. The large Harmer's clothing factory on St Andrews Street received a direct hit. In 1945 the city was also the intended target of a brief V-2 rocket campaign, though all these missed the city.

== Air raids ==
=== Raid Monitoring ===
The location, size and date of bombs dropped on Norwich were mapped by the Air Raid Precautions, as part of the UK bomb census. The bombs were physically mapped on 6-foot-square (1.8 m) map, created from three Ordnance Survey maps and mounted on chipboard, using 679 paper labels.

=== Early raids ===
The first raid of bombs occurred on 9 July 1940. Around 5 pm, eleven whistling bombs were dropped on the Riverside Works part of the city. On 30 July, many other buildings were hit, including the large Georgian buildings on Surrey Street. Although quite a number of raids were carried out on the city of Norwich in this year, damage to property was mostly confined to residential areas. Many of the raids were at night or in the early morning, but the most damaging visitations, and those that caused many of the casualties, took place in the afternoon or early evening. The city's death-toll for the year amounted to sixty-one, of whom twenty-six were killed on 9 July during the first raid which Norwich sustained. Throughout 1941, twenty more people were killed and twenty eight injured, during monthly attacks on the suburbs and residential areas.

=== 27 April 1942 ===
Raids were being carried out on Exeter, Bath, Canterbury and York, and incendiary bombs were responsible for a large proportion of the damage done. These cities were deliberately selected from the famous Baedeker Guidebooks in which they were marked as cultural locations containing many places of historic and archaeological importance, and were bombed as a direct response to Britain's bombing of the historic German city of Luebeck on 28 March.

In Norwich, the raid that began on the evening of 27 April 1942 was the most severe to hit the city during the war, being carried out by bombers of KG2, KG106, who were led by the pathfinders of I/KG100. Two nights later on 29 April, another raid took place, destroying many buildings in the city centre. Two churches were lost on the 27th, St Bartholomew in Heigham and St Benedicts. Both surviving towers still stand today (2019).

=== June 1942 ===
Known as "The Hell Fire Raid", three enemy aircraft which were later destroyed, dropped incendiaries and high explosives, causing several large fires. Notable examples included the thatched department store, Bonds, on All Saint's Green as well as the historic Old Boar's Head inn, which were gutted by fire. St Julian's Church in King Street was hit, as well as the Trinity Presbyterian Church in Theatre Street. 20 Timberhill, known as The Star and Crown public house, was destroyed, as was 72 St Giles Street and Heigham Grove. Many 17th century buildings were obliterated.

== Effects ==
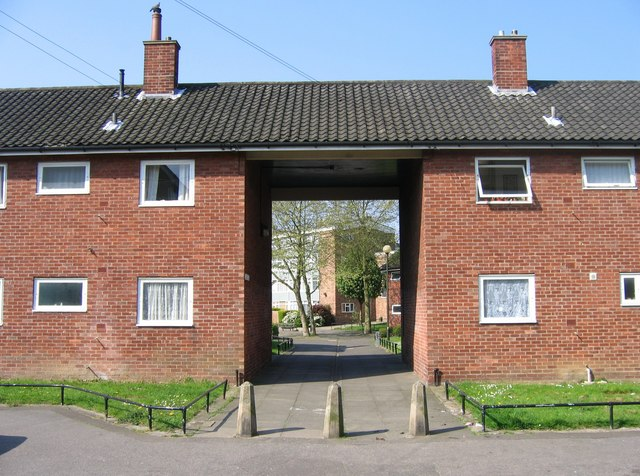
Globe Place, Norwich. View through into Globe Place from Walpole Street. Named after the Globe Pub which disappeared, along with much of this densely populated area during the Blitz of 1942

229 citizens were killed in the two Baedeker raids with 1000 others injured, and 340 by bombing throughout the war—giving Norwich the highest air raid casualties in Eastern England. Out of the 35,000 domestic dwellings in Norwich, 2,000 were destroyed, and another 27,000 suffered some damage. Fewer than 5,000 houses escaped without any damage at all.

Norwich City Station was lost in the bombings, along with large parts of St Stephen's Street. The thatched buildings on All Saint's Green, notably Bond's department store were completely destroyed by fire. In addition, the junction between Barn Road and St Benedict's Street was completely destroyed, with only the city wall surviving. St Paul's Church near Peacock Street and Willis Street was destroyed, with the surviving ruins being demolished in the 1950s and the site cleared in the 1960s to make way for the inner-ring road. Curls' Department store in Orford Place which was rebuilt in 1955, and was later Debenhams. St Augustine's School was wrecked, as well as the Norwich Institution for the Blind on Magdalen Street. Ralph Mottram, author of Assault Upon Norwich, stated that "those of us who drove through the blazing streets had an unpleasant reminder of old days of Ypres and Armentieres (First World War)".

== Aftermath ==
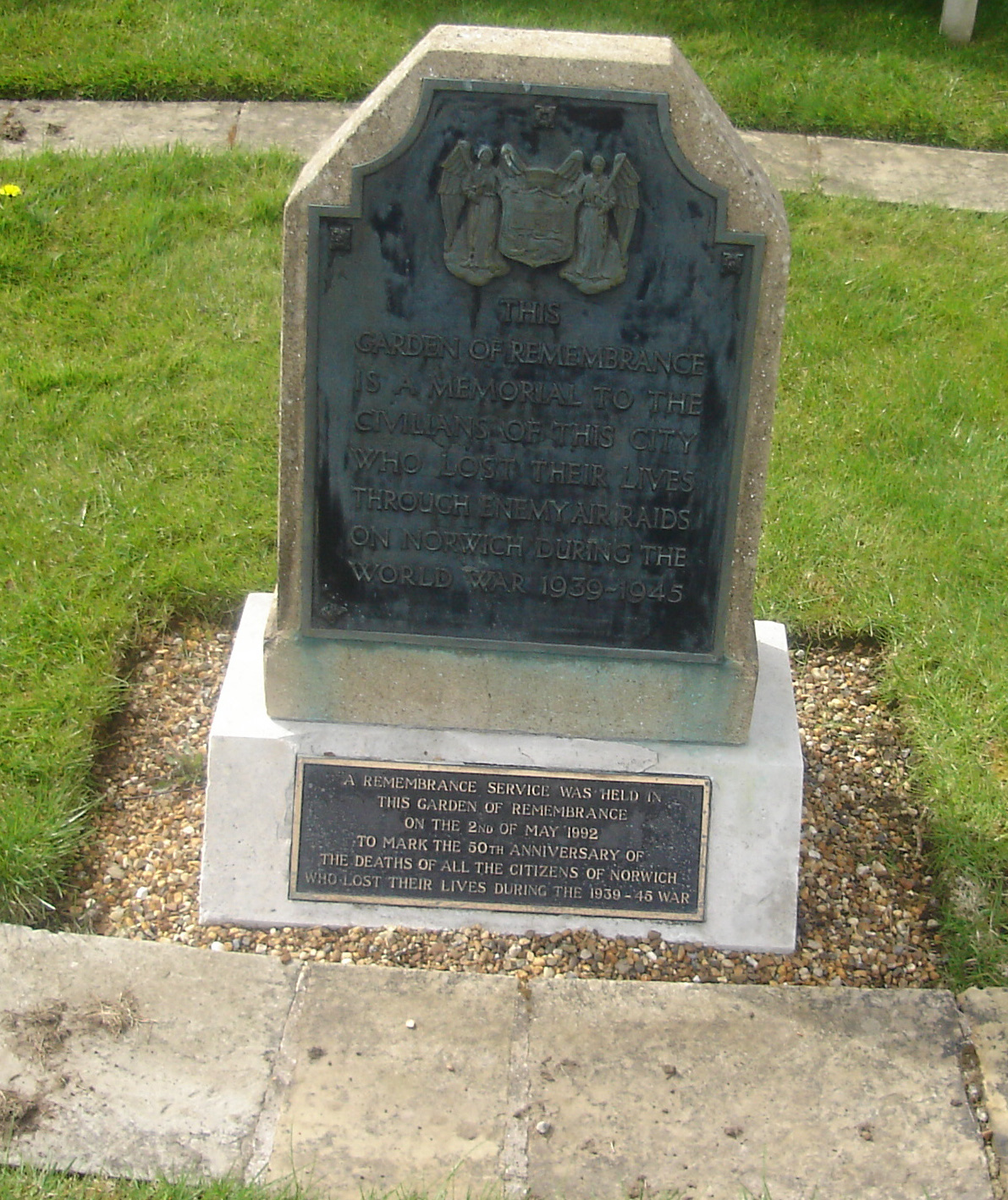
A photo of the Baedeker Blitz civilian memorial in Earlham Road Cemetery, Norwich

Repair work began in 1950, and the total cost of the work occasioned by all raids during April 1942 and since was approximately £1,060,000 of which £280,000 was for materials and haulage.

== See also ==
- History of Norwich
