= Swanton Novers =

Village in Norfolk, England

Coordinates: 52.85055°N 1.0001°E

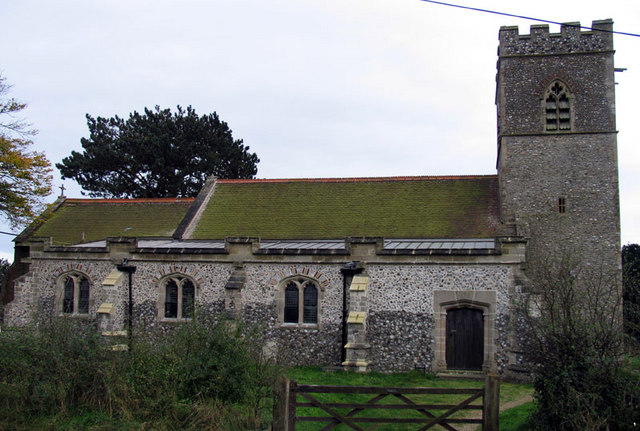
- St Edmund's Parish Church, Swanton Novers

- Location within Norfolk
- Area: 5.45 km^{2} (2.10 sq mi)
- Population: 229 (2011 census)
  - Density: 42/km^{2} (110/sq mi)
- OS grid reference: TG016317
  - London: 123 miles (198 km)
- Civil parish: Swanton Novers
- District: North Norfolk
- Shire county: Norfolk
- Region: East
- Country: England
- Sovereign state: United Kingdom
- Post town: MELTON CONSTABLE
- Postcode district: NR24
- Dialling code: 01263
- Police: Norfolk
- Fire: Norfolk
- Ambulance: East of England
- UK Parliament: Broadland and Fakenham

Swanton Novers is a village and a civil parish in the English county of Norfolk. The village is 15.1 miles (24.3 km) west-south-west of Cromer, 23.1 miles (37.2 km) north-north-west of Norwich and 123 kilometres (76 mi) north-north-east of London. The village lies 6 miles (9.7 km) south-west of the town of Holt. The nearest railway station is at Sheringham for the Bittern Line which runs between Sheringham, Cromer and Norwich. The nearest airport is Norwich International Airport.

== History ==
Swanton Novers has an entry in the Domesday Book of 1086, in which the village is recorded by the name Suanetuna. The main tenant was Bishop William. The survey also notes that there were 200 sheep. The name Suanetuna means 'town or settlement of the swine-herds'. The land was held by Milo de Nuiers in 1200. This name derives from Noyers-Bocage in Normandy.

== St Edmund's Church ==
St Edmund's parish church is a little remote from the village. The church has been heavily restored in recent times as it was in a very poor state of repair. The church's tower was rebuilt in 1821. Much of the restoration work has been carried out using old building materials from the original church buildings which dates from Norman times.

== Freedom of the Parish ==
The following people and military units have received the Freedom of the Parish of Swanton Novers.

=== Individuals ===
- Mrs. Valerie Hart: 22 July 2019.
- Mrs. Rosemary Leeder: 22 July 2019.
