= River Wensum SSSI =

Protected area in Norfolk, England

Coordinates: 52.7791°N 0.8310°E

River Wensum
- Site of Special Scientific Interest
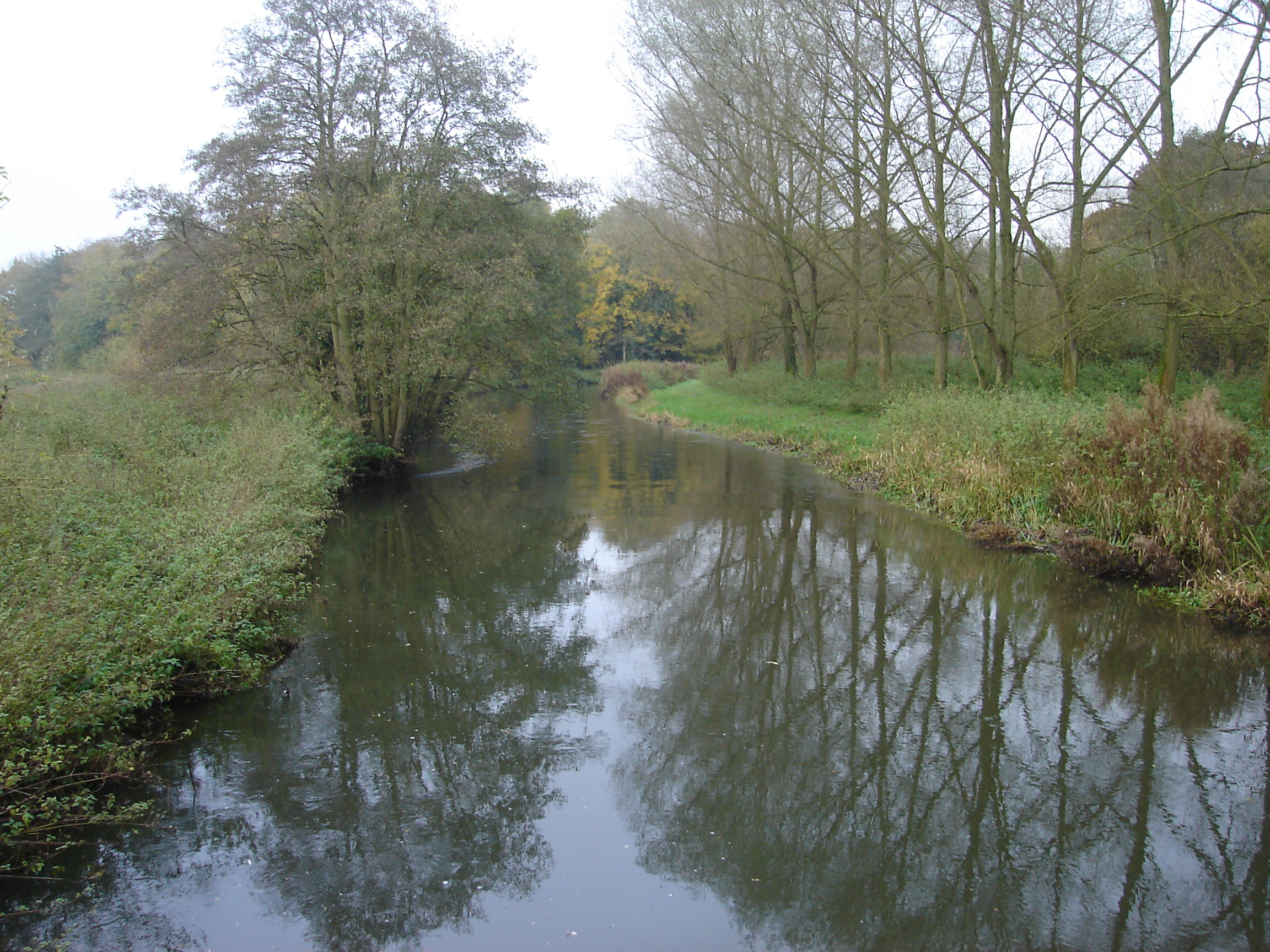
- The river at Lenwade
- Location of River Wensum.
- Area of search: Norfolk
- Grid reference: TF942246 to TG250078
- Interest: Biological
- Area: 971.9 (ac) 393.3 (ha)
- Notification date: 1993

The River Wensum SSSI is a 'whole river' Site of Special Scientific Interest located on the River Wensum that flows through the English county of Norfolk. The river was designated a SSSI in 1993 and a Special Area of Conservation SAC in 2000. It covers 44 miles (71 km) of the Upper Wensum from its source close to South Raynham downstream to Hellesdon Mill, an area of 971.9 acres (393.3 ha).

== Description ==
The Wensum's upper reaches are fed by springs that rise from chalk. It was selected as being one of the best examples of a lowland chalk and oolite river type III. There are four species of European importance in the river; the bullhead, the brook lamprey, the white-clawed crayfish and Desmoulin's whorl snail. The river holds 100 plant species including water crowfoot and water starwort

== Conservation ==
After many years of decline in the river, a survey was commissioned by Natural England in 2002. The survey showed that the ecological condition of the river had declined. The principal reasons for this were water quality and siltation. Water quality has been addressed and was improving, but the physical character of the river needs to be restored. In 2008, the River Wensum Restoration Strategy (RWRS) partnership was formed between; Environment Agency; Water Management Alliance and Natural England to restore the physical functioning of the Wensum. The 2002 report found that fourteen redundant water mills along the Wensum as having the most significant factor affecting morphology of the river channel, with 67% of the river backed up behind these structures. As a priority, the strategy recommended the lowering, removal or bypassing of these structures to allow more of the river to function naturally. Since 2008, the RWRS has made improvements to the river. The holistic whole river approach with co-operation from land owners, fisheries managers and other organizations has seen ongoing projects ranging from restoring gravel glides to removing silt.

The Norfolk Anglers Conservation Association carried out a successful river habitat restoration at their Sayers Meadow fishery at Lyng in the early 1980s. After dredging and a major abstraction pipeline had a detrimental effect on the Costessey Point fishery, the association has taken action to restore this well known water. The ongoing work will be used as a blueprint for future river conservation projects.
