= Auchonvillers Military Cemetery =

CWGC cemetery in Somme, France

Auchonvillers Communal Commonwealth War Graves Commission Cemetery
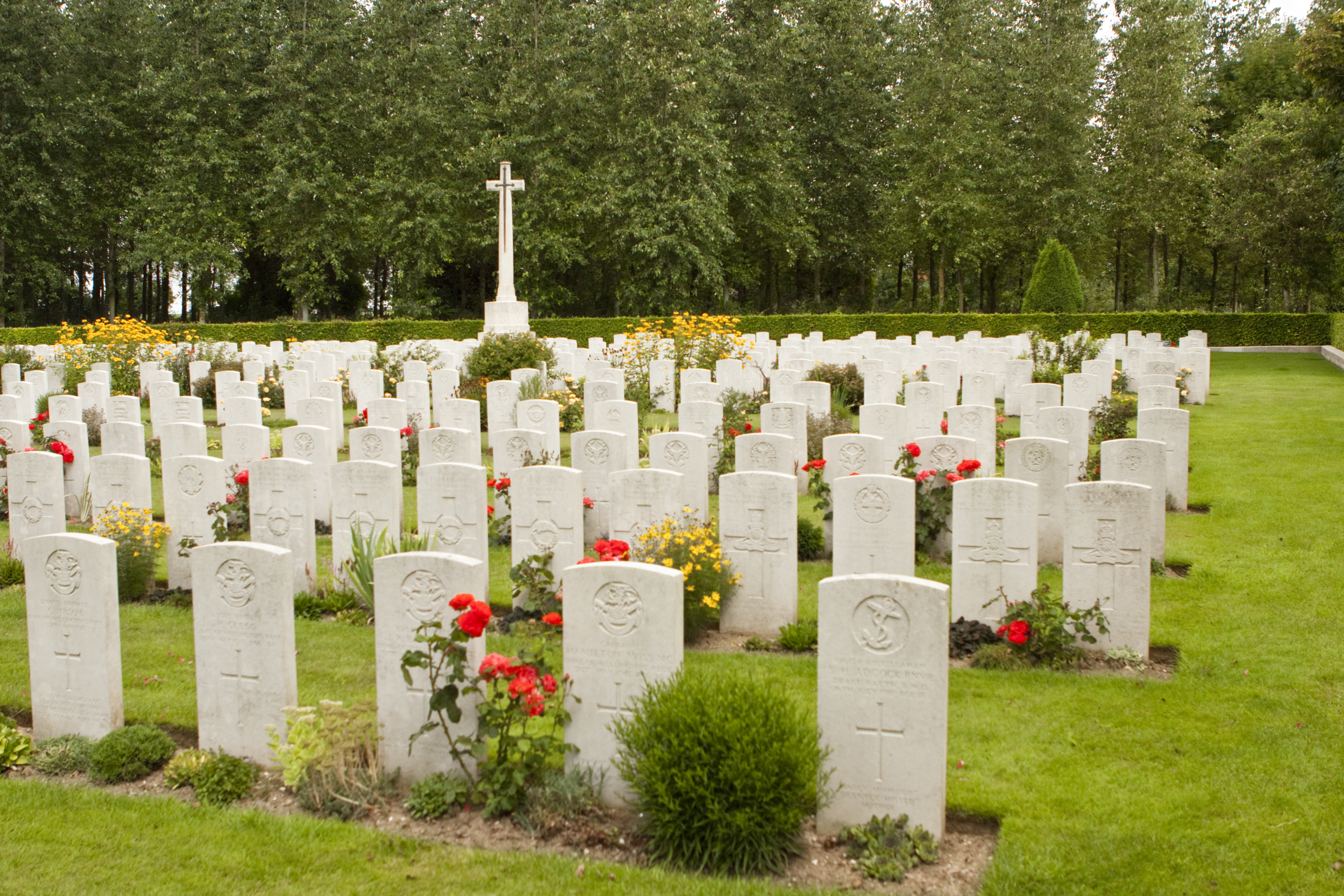
- Auchonvillers Military Cemetery

Details
- Established: June 1915
- Location: Auchonvillers, France
- Type: Military
- No. of graves: 528
- Website: cwgc.org

The Auchonvillers Military Cemetery is a cemetery located in the Somme region of France commemorating British and Commonwealth soldiers who fought in the Battle of the Somme in World War I. The cemetery contains soldiers who died manning the Allied front line near the village of Auchonvillers.

== Location ==
The cemetery is located on the outskirts of Auchonvillers, which is approximately 20 kilometers south of Arras, France. The two towns are linked by the D919 road. The coordinates of the cemetery are 50.08059°N 2.62674°E.

== Establishment of the Cemetery ==
=== History ===
Between the beginning of the war and mid-1915, the front was held by French troops, who started the cemetery in June 1915. From 1915 until the German retreat in February 1917, the cemetery was used by Commonwealth units including the 51st Highlanders and military hospitals, who referred to it as "Ocean Villas". The cemetery was rarely used after 1917. After the Armistice agreement ended hostilities in the Great War, 15 more graves were created for soldiers who died in the area east of the cemetery. French graves have since been moved to separate burial grounds. The cemetery was designed by Sir Reginald Blomfield and William Cowlishaw.

=== Statistics ===
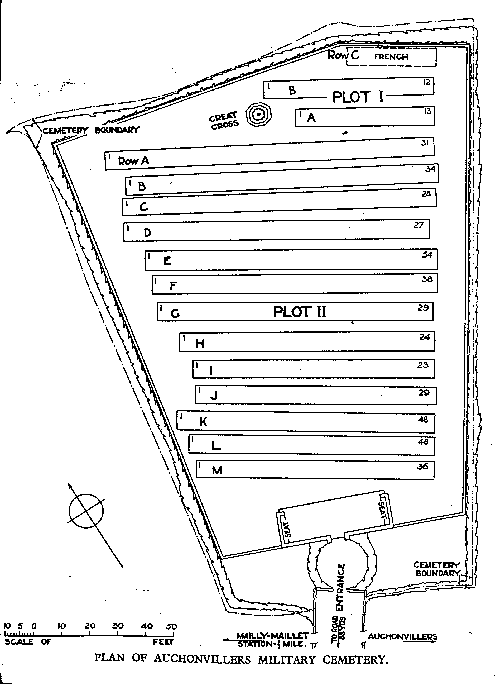
Cemetery Plan for Auchonvillers Cemetery

Currently, 528 Commonwealth soldiers are buried in the cemetery. 487 soldiers are identifiable, including 457 British, 8 Canadians, and 2 New Zealanders.

Identified Burials by Nationality
Nationality	Number of Burials
United Kingdom	457
Canada	8
New Zealand	2

Identified Burials by Unit
Lancashire Fusiliers	47	Border Regiment	33
Royal Dublin Fusiliers	25	Middlesex Regiment	23
New Zealand burials	22	Royal Sussex Regiment	18
Black Watch	17	Royal Fusiliers - City of London Regiment	16
Royal Engineers	15	Royal Field Artillery	15
Duke of Wellington - West Riding Regiment	13	Worcestershire Regiment	13
Royal Warwickshire Regiment	12	Seaforth Highlanders	12
Gordon Highlanders	11	Hampshire Regiment	11
Lincolnshire Regiment	11	Royal Irish Rifles	11
Royal Irish Fusiliers	9	Essex Regiment	8
Gloucestershire Regiment	8	Royal Irish Regiment	8
Royal Newfoundland Regiment	8	Royal Scots	8
South Wales Borderers	8	Suffolk Regiment	8
Argyll & Sutherland Highlanders	7	East Yorkshire Regt.	7
Highland Light Infantry	7	King's Own Scottish Borderers	7
East Lancashire Regiment	6	French burials	6
Royal Garrison Artillery	6	West Yorkshire Regiment	6
King's Own Yorkshire Light Infantry	5	Machine Gun Corps	5
Northumberland Fusiliers	5	Rifle Brigade	5
Hertfordshire Regiment	4	Loyal North Lancashire Regiment	4
Manchester Regiment	4	Royal Navy Division - Infantry	4
Bedfordshire Regiment	3	Monmouthshire Regiment	3
Nottinghamshire & Derbyshire Regiment	3	King's Own Royal Lancaster Regiment	3
South Lancashire Regiment	3	York & Lancaster Regiment	3
Royal Inniskilling Fusiliers	2	Royal Welsh Fusiliers	2
Buffs - East Kent Regiment	1	King's Liverpool Regiment	1
King's Royal Rifle Corps	1	King's Shropshire Light Infantry	1
Norfolk Regiment	1	Queen's - Royal West Surrey Regiment	1
Royal Berkshire Regiment	1	Royal Scots Fusiliers	1
