= NR postcode area =

Postcode area for Norfolk, England

Norwich
- Postcode area
- Coordinates: 52.647°N 1.339°E
- Country: United Kingdom
- Postcode area: NR
- Postcode area name: Norwich
- Post towns: 16
- Postcode districts: 36
- Postcode sectors: 114
- Postcodes (live): 23,457
- Postcodes (total): 28,198
- Statistics as at May 2020

The NR postcode area, also known as the Norwich postcode area, is a group of 35 postcode districts in the east of England, within 16 post towns. These cover central, north and eastern Norfolk (including Norwich, Great Yarmouth, Attleborough, Wymondham, Dereham, Fakenham, Walsingham, Wells-next-the-Sea, Melton Constable, Holt, Sheringham, Cromer and North Walsham) and part of north-east Suffolk (including Lowestoft, Beccles and Bungay).

== Coverage ==
The postcode districts are arranged in three roughly concentric rings:

- NR1-NR8, covering the Norwich built-up area.
- NR9-NR16, covering rural areas with the NORWICH post town.
- NR17-NR35, covering all other post towns in the area.

The approximate coverage of the postcode districts:

Postcode district	Post town	Coverage	Local authority area(s)
NR1	NORWICH	Thorpe Hamlet, Lakenham, (parts of) City Centre, areas close to Thorpe Road Mail Centre	Norwich
NR2	NORWICH	Parts of Eaton, parts of Earlham, western and south-western parts of Norwich and parts of the city centre	Norwich
NR3	NORWICH	N part of Norwich, within the ring-road: Mile Cross, New Catton	Norwich, Broadland
NR4	NORWICH	Suburbs and villages west and south-west of Norwich: Eaton, Tuckswood, Cringleford, Colney, Keswick	South Norfolk
NR5	NORWICH	West and north-west suburbs of Norwich: Bowthorpe, Costessey, Earlham	Norwich, South Norfolk
NR6	NORWICH	North and north-west suburbs of Norwich: Old Catton, Hellesdon	Norwich, Broadland
NR7	NORWICH	East and south-eastern suburbs of Norwich: Sprowston, Thorpe St. Andrew, Heartsease	Norwich, Broadland
NR8	NORWICH	Suburbs and villages north-west of Norwich: Drayton, Taverham, Ringland	Broadland, South Norfolk
NR9	NORWICH	Villages west and north-west of Norwich: Barford, Bawburgh, Easton, Hethersett, Hingham, Honingham, Lenwade, Little Melton, Lyng, Marlingford and Colton, Weston Longville	Broadland, South Norfolk
NR10	NORWICH	Villages and towns north and north-west of Norwich: Horsford, Pettywell, Reepham, Hevingham, Stratton Strawless, Horsham St Faith	Broadland, South Norfolk
NR11	NORWICH	Alby with Thwaite, Aldborough, Aylmerton, Aylsham, Banningham, Blickling, East Beckham, Little Barningham, Hanworth, North Barningham, Roughton, Felbrigg, Gimingham, Ingworth, Matlask, Mundesley, Southrepps, Trimingham, Wickmere	North Norfolk, Broadland
NR12	NORWICH	Bacton, Brumstead, Coltishall, East Ruston, Hickling, Ingham, Lessingham, Sloley, Stalham, Tunstead, Wroxham	North Norfolk, Broadland
NR13	NORWICH	Towns and villages east of Norwich: Acle, Brundall, Reedham, Rackheath, Salhouse	Broadland
NR14	NORWICH	Suburbs and villages south and south-east of Norwich: Mulbarton, Loddon, Poringland, Trowse, Haddiscoe	South Norfolk
NR15	NORWICH	Long Stratton, Hempnall, Tasburgh, Newton Flotman, Brooke	South Norfolk
NR16	NORWICH	Banham, Larling, New Buckenham	Breckland
NR17	ATTLEBOROUGH	Attleborough, Little & Great Ellingham, Old Buckenham	Breckland
NR18	NORWICH		non-geographic
NR18	WYMONDHAM	Wymondham	South Norfolk
NR19	NORWICH		non-geographic
NR19	DEREHAM	Dereham	Breckland
NR20	DEREHAM	Villages N and E of Dereham: Bawdeswell, Bylaugh, Elsing, Foxley, Foulsham, Gressenhall, Guestwick, Hockering, Mattishall, Whissonsett, Nethergate, North Elmham, Swanton Morley, Themelthorpe	Breckland, Broadland
NR21	FAKENHAM	Fakenham, Barsham, Binham, Fulmodeston, Colkirk, North Creake, South Creake, South Raynham, East Raynham, West Raynham, Hempton, Helhoughton, Hindringham, Tatterford, Toftrees	North Norfolk, King's Lynn and West Norfolk, Breckland
NR22	WALSINGHAM	Walsingham, Houghton St Giles, North Barsham	North Norfolk, King's Lynn and West Norfolk
NR23	WELLS-NEXT-THE-SEA	Wells-next-the-Sea, Quarles, Warham, Wighton	North Norfolk, King's Lynn and West Norfolk
NR24	MELTON CONSTABLE	Melton Constable, Stody, Briston, Briningham, Brinton, Edgefield, Gunthorpe, Sharrington, Plumstead, Swanton Novers	North Norfolk
NR25	HOLT	Holt, Kelling, Baconsthorpe, Blakeney, Bodham, Cley next the Sea, Edgfield, Hempstead, High Kelling, Hunworth Langham, Letheringsett, Glandford, Weybourne, West Beckham, Salthouse	North Norfolk
NR26	NORWICH		non-geographic
NR26	SHERINGHAM	Sheringham, Beeston Regis, Upper Sheringham	North Norfolk
NR27	CROMER	Cromer, East Runton, West Runton, Frogshall, Northrepps, Overstrand	North Norfolk
NR28	NORTH WALSHAM	North Walsham, Antingham, Crostwight, Honing, Knapton, Trunch, Paston, Ridlington	North Norfolk
NR29	GREAT YARMOUTH	Catfield, Hemsby, Potter Heigham, Rollesby	Great Yarmouth, North Norfolk
NR30	GREAT YARMOUTH	Great Yarmouth, Caister-on-Sea, West Caister, Berney Arms	Great Yarmouth, Broadland
NR31	GREAT YARMOUTH	Gorleston-on-Sea, Bradwell	Great Yarmouth
NR32	LOWESTOFT	North Lowestoft	East Suffolk
NR33	LOWESTOFT	South Lowestoft	East Suffolk
NR34	BECCLES	Beccles, Worlingham, Gillingham, Stockton	East Suffolk, South Norfolk
NR35	BUNGAY	Bungay, Topcroft, Flixton	East Suffolk, South Norfolk
NR99	NORWICH		non-geographic

== Map ==
NR postcode area map, showing postcode districts in red and post towns in grey text, with links to nearby IP and PE postcode areas.

== See also ==
- Postcode Address File
- Extreme points of the United Kingdom
- List of postcode areas in the United Kingdom
