= Fakenham =

Town and civil parish in Norfolk, England

Coordinates: 52.8356°N 0.8510°E

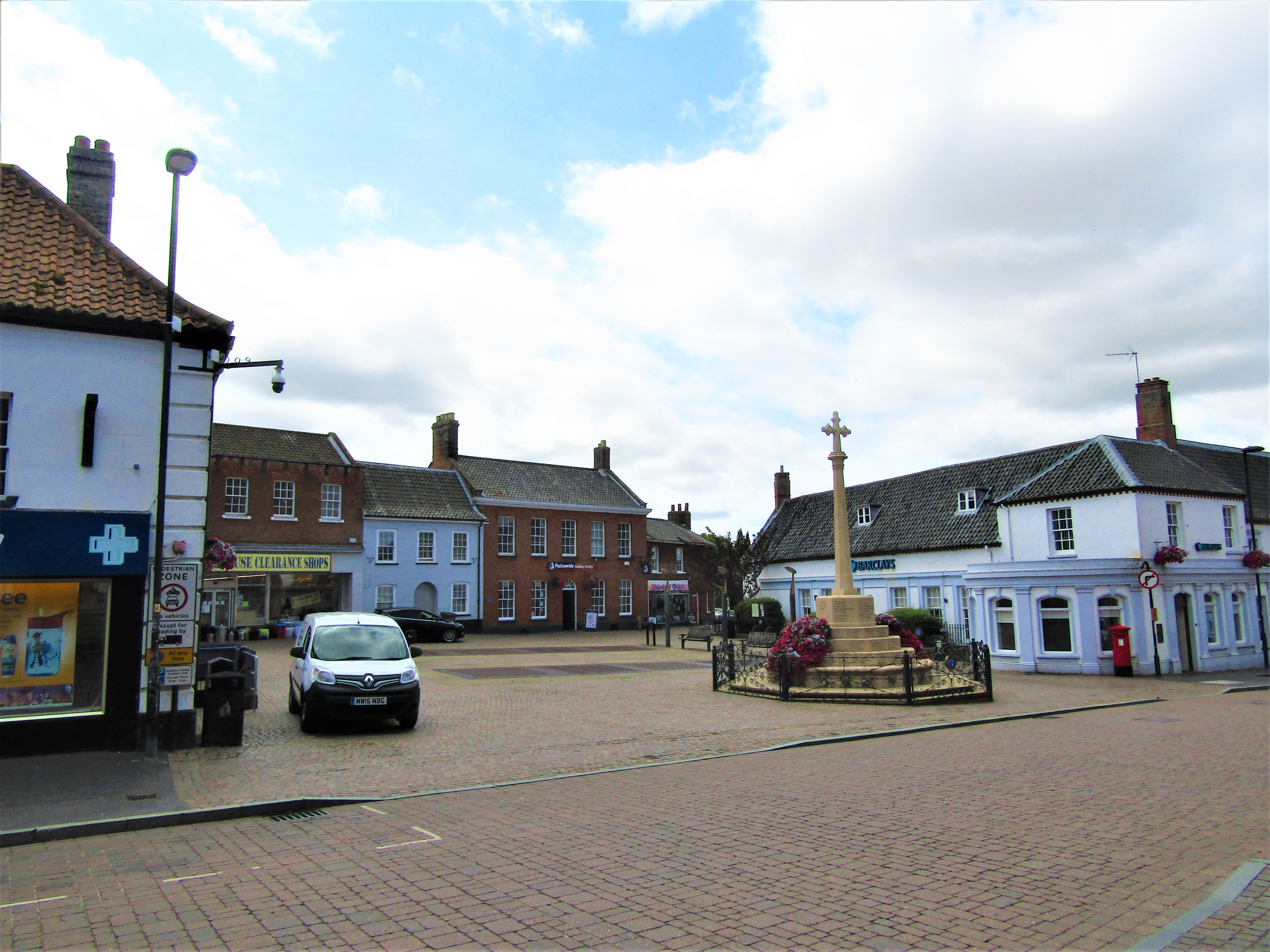
- Market Place and war memorial

- Location within Norfolk
- Area: 9.04 km^{2} (3.49 sq mi)
- Population: 8,385 (2021 census)
  - Density: 928/km^{2} (2,400/sq mi)
- OS grid reference: TF918296
- District: North Norfolk
- Shire county: Norfolk
- Region: East
- Country: England
- Sovereign state: United Kingdom
- Post town: FAKENHAM
- Postcode district: NR21
- Dialling code: 01328
- Police: Norfolk
- Fire: Norfolk
- Ambulance: East of England
- UK Parliament: Broadland and Fakenham

Fakenham (/ˈfeɪkənəm/ FAKE-un-um) is a market town and civil parish in Norfolk, England. It is situated on the River Wensum, about 25 miles (40 kilometres) north-west of Norwich. The town is at the junction of several roads, including the A148 from King's Lynn to Cromer, the A1067 to Norwich and the A1065 to Swaffham.

The civil parish has an area of 3.49 mi^{2} (9.0 km^{2}). In the 2001 census, it had a population of 7,357 in 3,292 households; this increased to 7,617 at the 2011 census. For the purposes of local government, the parish lies within the district of North Norfolk. and within the County of Norfolk.

Fakenham has been a market town since 1250, known particularly for its corn, barley and wheat trading; in the 19th century, it became noted for its printing. Fakenham Racecourse is a thoroughbred horse racing venue to the south of the town.

The town has a long name of Fakenham Lancaster which derives from the ownership of the manor in 1377 being transferred to John of Gaunt, the Duke of Lancaster. The name continues to be used today, including on recently placed history trail plaques around the town; it is also used to name the town's two wards, for the purpose of electing councillors to North Norfolk District Council: Lancaster North and Lancaster South. The town is part of the County Division of Fakenham and the Raynhams for the purpose of electing a county councillor to Norfolk County Council.

== History ==
The name Fakenham is Saxon and has been interpreted as meaning "homestead of Facca", or "Fair Place"/"Place on a Fair River". Numerous arrowheads and flint tools found in the parish indicate occupation during Neolithic times. Two copper alloy socketed axeheads have been unearthed in Fakenham dated to the Bronze Age. In 2015, a lead plaque was found near Fakenham dating to the Early Medieval period, and has been interpreted as having been used to overcome an illness-causing dwarf based on its runic inscription.

Before 1066 the manor of Fakenham was held by King Harold, before being taken by King William the Conqueror. The manor was relatively large, containing surrounding villages such as Pudding Norton and Thorpland. A number of Early to Late Saxon brooches, buckles, and pottery have been unearthed in the area. A Middle Saxon coin found in the parish is of the East Anglian king Beonna. A watermill was mentioned in Fakenham in the Domesday Book of 1086, but it was later demolished.

In November 1297, Guy Ferre was recorded as the owner of Fakenham Manor, which King Edward I had given to him for life. During the 13th century, the hamlet of Thorpland had 90 parishioners, but by the 16th century it had largely been depopulated, and today all that remains is the hall.

Fires broke out in the town in 1660, 1718 and 1738, which destroyed or partly destroyed a number of buildings. The 4 August 1738 fire destroyed 26 buildings in Fakenham.

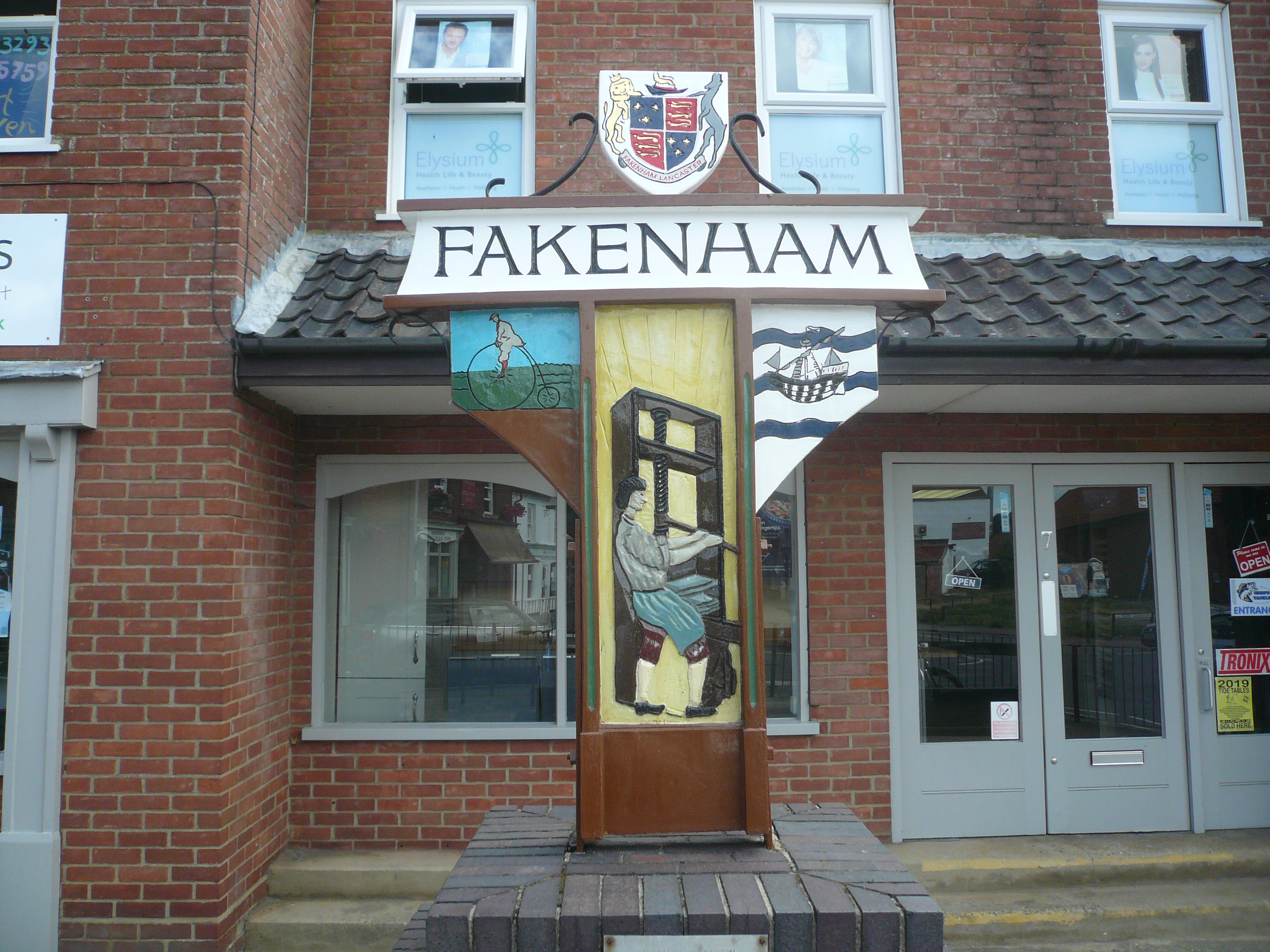
Fakenham sign

== Geography ==
Fakenham is situated in the North Norfolk district, between Pudding Norton and Barsham, on the north bank of the River Wensum. It is sited about 19 mi (31 km) north-east of King's Lynn, 19 mi (31 km) south-west of Cromer and 25 mi (40 km) north-west of Norwich.

To the south-east of Fakenham is Pensthorpe Natural Park, which contains over 700 acres of woodland and lakes, and four gardens.

== Economy ==
Fakenham has been a market town since 1250. Agricultural products and cattle have long been sold at the town's corn and flea markets. John Chambers wrote in his A General History of the County of Norfolk (1829): "Fakenham is a small town, with a good corn market, attended by buyers from Wells, and other contiguous ports. The general market here is on Thursdays, when a large quantity of barley and wheat are sold by samples".

During the 19th century, Fakenham became a major centre for printing, which continued into the 20th century. Fakenham Prepress Solutions is a contemporary printing and illustrating company based in Fakenham. The Kinnerton Confectionery Company was established in the town in 1978.

== Landmarks ==
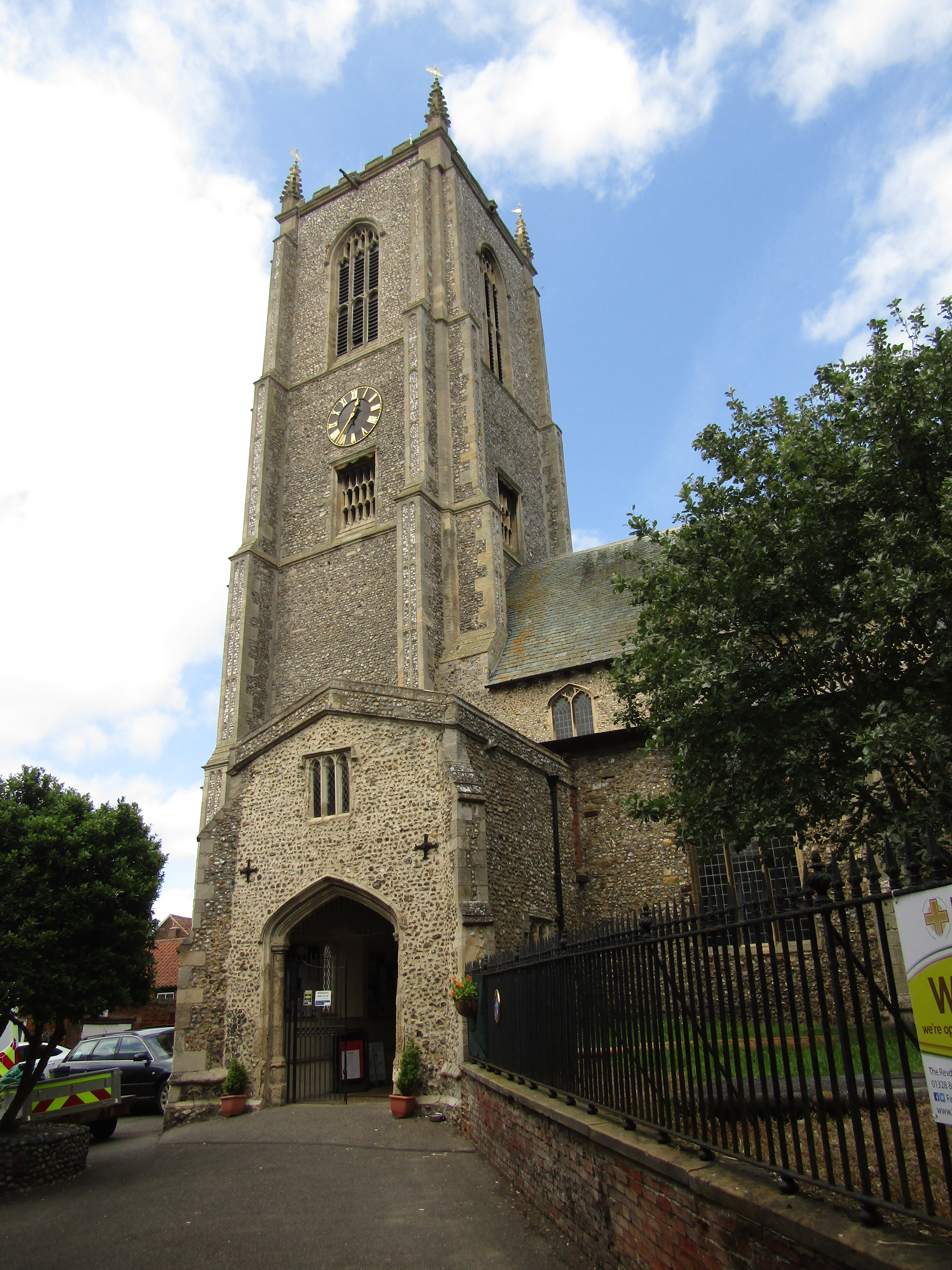
Saint Peter and Saint Paul Parish Church

Fakenham contains the 14th-century Saint Peter and Saint Paul Parish Church, which replaced an earlier Saxon church. The 115 feet (35 m) tower was built in the 15th century. Baron's Hall was originally built in 1593, but was demolished in 1812 and a new hall opened in 1825. The Corn Exchange opened in 1855, replacing an earlier sessions house. The corn exchange served as the local headquarters for the Home Guard during World War II.

The former Star Inn (now a private house) on Oak Street was built in the 17th century. Grove House, The Red Lion, The Wooden Horse and former Barclays Bank retain some 17th-century features. The town also contains the Fakenham Museum of Gas and Local History, which displays equipment used for making town gas from coal.

== Sport ==
Fakenham Cricket Club is one of the oldest in Norfolk; it started in 1815 with a combined team, including Hempton and Walsingham, and formed in its own right in 1883. The 1st team of the club won the Norfolk Alliance Premier Division league title in 2001, 2011, 2015 and 2018; also the Carter Cup in 2010. Queens Road Recreation Ground is a recreational ground in the centre of Fakenham.

Fakenham Golf Club, is situated in the Parish of Hempton, on the southern outskirts of the town on the southern side of the Wensum, was originally established in February 1889. The present 6,245 yard course was designed in 1974.

Fakenham Racecourse is a thoroughbred horse racing venue, actually situated in Hempton Parish, to the south of the town. Charles III is patron. It is the venue for the West Norfolk Hunt's Point to Point steeplechase.

== Transport ==
=== Railway ===
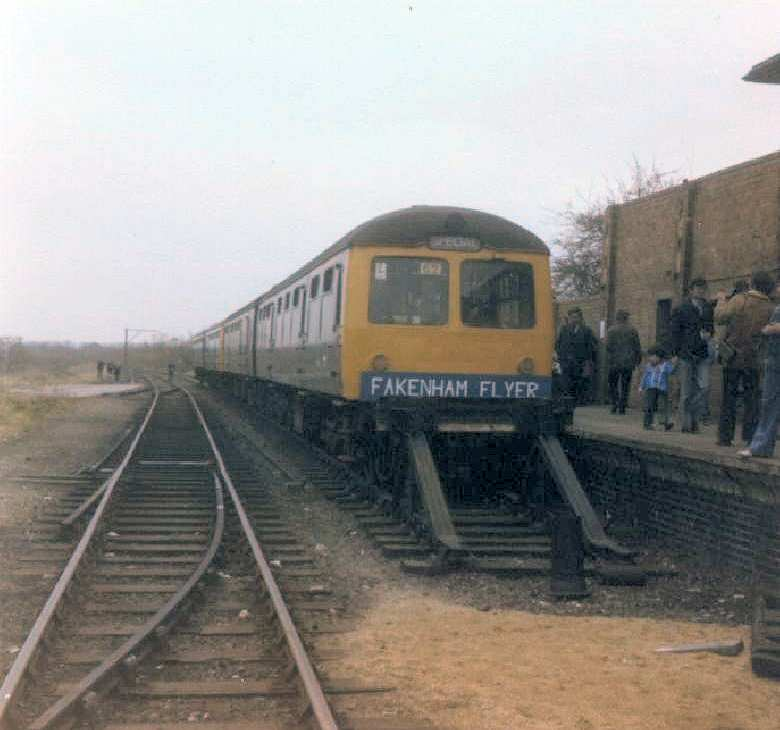
The Fakenham Flyer in 1979

Fakenham is no longer served by the National Rail network; the nearest stations are at Norwich, King's Lynn and Sheringham.

The town used to have two railway stations:

- Fakenham East, opened as Fakenham on 20 March 1849, was the terminus of the Wymondham to Wells Branch railway. The line was extended to Wells-next-the-Sea in 1857 and the station was renamed Fakenham East in 1948. It was recommended for closure in the 1963 Beeching Report and was closed by the government in the following year.
- Fakenham West opened in 1880. It was built as part of the Midland and Great Northern Joint Railway main line that meandered across Norfolk from King's Lynn to Sheringham, Cromer, Norwich and Great Yarmouth. It was closed in 1959.

There was no connection between the two railway lines; the line south of Fakenham West crossed the line from Fakenham East south of the former station, on a girder bridge that still exists immediately north of a three-span bridge over the River Wensum.

When Fakenham East closed to passengers on 5 October 1964, the line remained open for goods. A special passenger service named the Fakenham Flyer ran on 21 April 1979, but this proved to be the only such instance, as the line closed permanently the following year.

=== Buses ===
Fakenham is served by several bus routes operated by different companies:

- Sanders Coaches towards Holt and Sheringham
- Lynx to Wells-next-the-Sea and King's Lynn
- First Norfolk & Suffolk to Norwich
- Konectbus to Dereham

=== Roads ===
The town is at the junction of several local roads, including the A148 from King's Lynn to Cromer, the A1067 to Norwich and the A1065 to Swaffham. A single-carriageway bypass was constructed in the mid-1980s to carry the A148 to the north of the town.

== Notable people ==
Notable people from Fakenham include:

- Thomas Miller, bookseller and antiquarian
- Sir Robert Seppings, a shipwright who was knighted on the Royal Yacht in 1819
- Sir George Edwards, farm workers' leader, and later local MP
- Peter Parfitt, an England and Middlesex cricketer in the early 1960s, attended Fakenham Grammar School
- Horatio Nelson, victor at the Battle of Trafalgar in 1805
- Simon Dring, journalist and television producer

Other notable people from the town include footballing brothers Ryan Jarvis and Rossi Jarvis, formerly of Norwich City, and Adam Tann, whose League career ended at Chelmsford City and who is the cousin of the Jarvis brothers. Another former Norwich City footballer, Matt Gill, grew up in the town and attended the local junior school and high school.
